= 1990 in music =

This is a list of notable events in music that took place in the year 1990.

This year was the peak of cassette sales in the United States, with sales declining year on year since then.

== Specific locations ==
- 1990 in British music
- 1990 in Japanese music
- 1990 in Norwegian music
- 1990 in Scandinavian music
- 1990 in South Korean music

== Specific genres ==
- 1990 in country music
- 1990 in heavy metal music
- 1990 in hip-hop
- 1990 in Latin music
- 1990 in jazz
- 1990 in progressive rock

== Events ==
=== January–March ===
- January 8 – Irish singer Sinéad O'Connor released her single "Nothing Compares 2 U" (originally written, composed and performed by Prince) which became one of the best selling singles in the world in 1990 and topped the charts in many countries including the United States and the United Kingdom.
- January 18 – Eric Clapton plays the first of eighteen shows in a three-week span at London's Royal Albert Hall.
- January 21 – MTV's Unplugged is broadcast for the first time, on cable television, with British band Squeeze.
- February 6
  - Billy Idol is involved in a serious motorcycle accident, resulting in several broken bones. Idol had been scheduled to have a major role in Oliver Stone's film The Doors, but due to his injuries, the role was reduced almost to a bit part. The role of the T-1000 in Terminator 2: Judgment Day, originally intended for Idol, was recast entirely as a result of the accident.
  - Bob Marley's birthday is a national holiday in Jamaica for the first time.
- February 14 – 50,000 fans watch The Rolling Stones play the first of 10 concerts at Tokyo's Korakuen Dome, the beginning of the Stones' first ever tour of Japan. The group was originally scheduled to perform there in 1973 but a drug conviction prevented Mick Jagger from obtaining a visa at the time.
- February 16 – Ike Turner is sentenced to four years in prison for possession of cocaine.
- February 21 – The 32nd Annual Grammy Awards are presented in Los Angeles, hosted by Garry Shandling. Bonnie Raitt's Nick of Time wins Album of the Year, while Bette Midler's cover of "Wind Beneath My Wings" wins both Record of the Year and Song of the Year. Milli Vanilli win Best New Artist.
- February 24 – The Byrds (Roger McGuinn, Chris Hillman and David Crosby) reunite, for the first time in 25 years, to perform at a Los Angeles tribute to Roy Orbison. The three are joined unexpectedly on stage by Bob Dylan, who sings "Mr. Tambourine Man" with the band.
- March 15 – MCA Inc. purchases Geffen Records for over $550 million in stock. Under the agreement, David Geffen will continue to run the record company through an employment contract.
- March 16 – Flea and Chad Smith of Red Hot Chili Peppers are arrested and charged for an incident two days earlier at a performance in Daytona Beach during MTV's spring break coverage, in which they allegedly sexually assaulted and verbally abused a female audience member after jumping from the stage. They are released on $2,000 bail.
- March 20
  - Gloria Estefan's tour bus is involved in an accident. Estefan suffers several broken bones in her back.
  - A riot almost breaks out in downtown Los Angeles when Depeche Mode draw a crowd of 20,000 during an in-store appearance at Wherehouse Entertainment to sign copies of their new album Violator.
- March 25 – Mötley Crüe's Tommy Lee is arrested for allegedly exposing his buttocks during a performance in Augusta, Georgia.
- March 28 – The Go-Go's reunite to play a benefit concert for the California Environmental Protection Act. They play several more reunion shows later in the year.

=== April–June ===
- April 4 – Gloria Estefan returns to Miami, Florida after undergoing back surgery following the March 20 accident.
- April 5 – Michael Jackson is awarded 'Artist of the Decade' by George H. W. Bush at the White House.
- April 6 – Mötley Crüe's Tommy Lee suffers a mild concussion after falling off of scaffolding above his elevated drum kit during a performance in New Haven, Connecticut.
- April 7 – Neil Young, Elton John, Kris Kristofferson, Willie Nelson, John Mellencamp, Guns N' Roses and Jackson Browne perform at Farm Aid IV in Indiana. John dedicates "Candle in the Wind" to AIDS patient Ryan White during his performance. White dies the following day.
- April 13 – Madonna starts her Blond Ambition Tour in Tokyo, Japan.
- April 16 – A tribute concert is held at Wembley Stadium for recently freed anti-apartheid activist Nelson Mandela, who appears in a pre-taped 45-minute speech at the event. Performers include Anita Baker, Tracy Chapman, Peter Gabriel, The Neville Brothers and Neil Young. The event is broadcast to 61 countries around the world.
- April 24 – Janet Jackson is honored with a Star on the Hollywood Walk of Fame.
- April 25 – Jimi Hendrix's Fender Stratocaster, on which he performed his version of the "Star Spangled Banner" at Woodstock, is auctioned off in London for $295,000.
- April 27 – Axl Rose marries model Erin Everly, daughter of singer Don Everly, in a Las Vegas ceremony. Divorce papers are filed on May 24, then withdrawn, then filed again in October.
- May 5 – The 35th Eurovision Song Contest, held in Vatroslav Lisinski Concert Hall in Zagreb, is won by Italian singer Toto Cutugno for the song "Insieme: 1992", Italy's first victory in the contest since 1964. At 46 years old, Cutugno becomes the oldest winner of the contest to date, a record he holds until 2001.
- May 6 – Valery Leontiev show "It seems to me that I have not lived" in the Olympic Stadium.
- May 12 – First Prague Spring International Music Festival following the Velvet Revolution: Rafael Kubelík conducts the Czech Philharmonic orchestra in Smetana's Má vlast.
- May 18 – The Rolling Stones open their Urban Jungle European tour in Rotterdam, the Netherlands.
- May 29
  - In Canada, Toronto police threaten to arrest Madonna if she performs her simulated masturbation scene during her performance of "Like a Virgin" on her Blond Ambition Tour. Madonna refuses to change her show, and the police decide not to press charges, later denying that they had ever threatened to do so (a claim refuted by footage captured during the filming of Madonna's 1991 documentary Truth or Dare).
  - At the Eurovision Young Musicians Competition 1990 finals, held at the Musikverein in Vienna, Austria, pianist Nick van Oosterum of the Netherlands takes first place.
- June 10 – Members of rap group 2 Live Crew are arrested and charged with obscenity after a performance in a Hollywood, Florida nightclub.
- June 12 – Mariah Carey releases her debut album, which would go on to top the Billboard 200 for 11 consecutive weeks.
- June 30 – Knebworth 1990, a one-off festival at Knebworth Park, England in support of Nordoff-Robbins Music Therapy. Participating musicians have all been winners of the Silver Clef Award. The acts include headliners Pink Floyd, Genesis, Robert Plant, Elton John, Dire Straits, Status Quo, Eric Clapton and others.

=== July–September ===
- July 7 – The Three Tenors give their first concert, at the Baths of Caracalla in Rome.
- July 14 – Jean Michel Jarre's concert Paris la Defense attracts 2.5 million spectators.
- July 21 – Roger Waters and guest stars stage a performance of Pink Floyd's The Wall in Berlin, Germany to commemorate the fall of the Berlin Wall eight months earlier. Scorpions, Cyndi Lauper, Thomas Dolby, Sinéad O'Connor, The Band and Bryan Adams are among the performers.
- August 5 – Madonna ends her Blond Ambition Tour in Nice, France. The last date was aired live and broadcast on HBO in United States, and later released as Laser Disc only.
- August 13 – Curtis Mayfield is paralyzed from the neck down in an accident at an outdoor concert in Flatbush, Brooklyn, after stage lighting equipment collapses on top of him.
- August 19 – Leonard Bernstein conducts his final performance at Tanglewood; he suffers a coughing fit in the middle of one piece which almost brings the concert to a premature end.
- August 22 – James MacMillan's symphonic piece The Confession of Isobel Gowdie premieres at The Proms in London.
- August 24
  - A judge rules that heavy metal band Judas Priest is not responsible for the actions of two Nevada youths who shot themselves, one fatally, after listening to the band's music in December 1985.
  - Irish singer Sinéad O'Connor sparks controversy when she refuses to play a concert at the Garden State Arts Center in New Jersey unless the venue refrains from its tradition of playing a recording of the American national anthem before the performance. O'Connor is criticized and her music is dropped from a number of radio stations as a result.
- August 27 – Guitarist Stevie Ray Vaughan is killed in a helicopter crash following a concert at the Alpine Valley Music Theatre in East Troy, Wisconsin. He was 35.
- September 4 – Walter Yetnikoff steps down after fifteen years as President of CBS Records.
- September 11 – After a decade of performing in the Francophone world, Céline Dion makes her formal English-language debut in the United States with the release of her album Unison.
- September 26 – The poorly received Cop Rock premieres on US television; it was TV's only musical police drama.

=== October–December ===
- October 9 – Leonard Bernstein announces his retirement from the conducting podium; he dies five days later.
- October 20 – A Florida jury acquits 2 Live Crew of the obscenity charges stemming from a June 10 performance of their act known for its sexually explicit lyrics.
- October 22 – Pearl Jam, then named "Mookie Blaylock", play their first show as a band at the Off Ramp club in Seattle, Washington.
- October 27 – Janet Jackson's "Black Cat" reaches number one. It was also the first song to simultaneously peak atop the Billboard Hot 100 and Mainstream Rock chart.
- November 6 – Madonna releases her new single, "Justify My Love". The accompanying music video is banned by MTV amid international controversy over its sexually explicit content.
- November 21 – The Rolling Stones frontman Mick Jagger finally marries longtime girlfriend Jerry Hall in a traditional Hindu ceremony on the island of Bali, although the wedding's legality is questionable.
- November 27 – Amid growing public skepticism towards the artistic integrity of dance-pop duo Milli Vanilli as well as creative differences with frontmen Fab Morvan and Rob Pilatus, music producer Frank Farian admits that Morvan and Pilatus had been lip-synching all of their songs, including hits such as "Girl You Know It's True." In actuality, the tracks were composed and recorded by an ensemble of much older artists. Milli Vanilli's Grammy award for Best New Artist is voided in the ensuing fallout; accounts vary as to whether it was revoked or if Morvan and Pilatus returned it themselves.
- December 1
  - ABC airs a television special accompanying the Red Hot + Blue benefit album in which contemporary pop performers reinterpret the songs of Cole Porter. The special includes video clips portraying the societal effects of AIDS.
  - The 19th OTI Festival, held at the Circus Maximus of the Caesars Palace in Las Vegas, United States, is won by the song "Un bolero", written by Francisco Curiel and Pedro Alberto Cárdenas, and performed Carlos Cuevas representing Mexico.
- December 3 – Following the banning of her "Justify My Love" music video by MTV, singer Madonna appears on Nightline to defend the video.
- December 15 – Rod Stewart marries model Rachel Hunter.
- December 31 – The nineteenth annual New Year's Rockin' Eve special airs on ABC, with appearances by The Beach Boys, Bell Biv DeVoe, The Kentucky Headhunters, Nelson, The O'Jays and Sweet Sensation.

=== Also in 1990 ===
- Fall – For the first time, Amy Grant and Gary Chapman hold a night of music at their Franklin, Tennessee Riverstone Farm, for local teenagers. Performers included Rich Mullins, Rick Elias, Charlie Peacock, Wes King and Michael W. Smith. The event becomes known as "The Loft".
- Guitarists: Dan Nilsson & Micke Bargstörm, Bassist: Martin Persson & Drummer: Rille Even, all quit Opeth who were the original members of the band. David Isberg, the only remaining original member hires Guitarists: Mikael Åkerfeldt (who applied for a bassist position even when the band already had bassist causing friction but ended up as a guitarist) Andreas Dimeo, Bassist: Nick Döring & Drummer: Anders Nordin.
- Studio Fredman is built.
- Sons of Kyuss change their name to Kyuss and add new members, except for guitarist Josh Homme.
- After a hiatus of 7 years, rock group Styx reform to record a new album and tour without long-time guitarist Tommy Shaw, who was committed to Damn Yankees at the time.
- Tapes of the original William Walton score for the 1969 film Battle of Britain are rediscovered, having been lost since the score was abandoned in favour of one by Ron Goodwin.

== Bands formed ==
- See Musical groups established in 1990

== Bands disbanded ==
- See Musical groups disestablished in 1990

== Albums released ==
=== January–March ===
Date		Album	Artist	Notes
J A N U A R Y	8	Scumdogs of the Universe	Gwar	-
J A N U A R Y	15	Flood	They Might Be Giants	-
J A N U A R Y	15	Reading, Writing and Arithmetic	The Sundays	Debut
J A N U A R Y	16	The Hit List	Joan Jett	Covers album
J A N U A R Y	16	Pale	Toad the Wet Sprocket	-
J A N U A R Y	16	RVS III	Ricky Van Shelton	-
J A N U A R Y	23	Lone Wolf	Hank Williams Jr.	-
J A N U A R Y	23	Missing Links Volume Two	The Monkees	Rarities compilation
J A N U A R Y	23	Stick It to Ya	Slaughter	Debut
J A N U A R Y	29	A Bit of What You Fancy	The Quireboys	Debut
J A N U A R Y	29	Cloudcuckooland	Lightning Seeds	-
J A N U A R Y	29	Vigil in a Wilderness of Mirrors	Fish	-
J A N U A R Y	29	Riverside	Luka Bloom	-
J A N U A R Y	29	The Sweet Keeper	Tanita Tikaram	-
J A N U A R Y	?	1990	Daniel Johnston	-
J A N U A R Y	?	Colour	The Christians	US
J A N U A R Y	?	Complete Discography	Minor Threat	Compilation
F E B R U A R Y	5	The Language of Life	Everything but the Girl	-
F E B R U A R Y	5	Chill Out	The KLF	-
F E B R U A R Y	5	Lost Paradise	Paradise Lost	Debut
F E B R U A R Y	6	Funky Technician	Lord Finesse and DJ Mike Smooth	Debut
F E B R U A R Y	7	Frizzle Fry	Primus	Debut
F E B R U A R Y	9	Blue Sky Mining	Midnight Oil	-
F E B R U A R Y	12	Please Hammer, Don't Hurt 'Em	MC Hammer	US
F E B R U A R Y	12	Stay Sick!	The Cramps	-
F E B R U A R Y	12	The Comforts of Madness	Pale Saints	-
F E B R U A R Y	13	Chance	The Rave-Ups	-
F E B R U A R Y	13	Shake Your Money Maker	The Black Crowes	Debut
F E B R U A R Y	13	Welcome to the Beautiful South	The Beautiful South	US
F E B R U A R Y	16	Naked City	Naked City	-
F E B R U A R Y	16	Spiritual Healing	Death	-
F E B R U A R Y	17	Heritage	Earth, Wind & Fire	-
F E B R U A R Y	19	Extricate	The Fall	-
F E B R U A R Y	19	Up to No Good	Peter Wolf	-
F E B R U A R Y	20	Carved in Sand	Mission UK	US
F E B R U A R Y	20	Dark at the End of the Tunnel	Oingo Boingo	-
F E B R U A R Y	20	This Should Move Ya	Mantronix	US
F E B R U A R Y	21	Break Through	B'z	-
F E B R U A R Y	21	Heading for Tomorrow	Gamma Ray	-
F E B R U A R Y	21	Same Place the Fly Got Smashed	Guided by Voices	-
F E B R U A R Y	22	Blackout in the Red Room	Love/Hate	-
F E B R U A R Y	22	Damn Yankees	Damn Yankees	-
F E B R U A R Y	22	Gold Afternoon Fix	The Church	-
F E B R U A R Y	22	Submarine Bells	The Chills	-
F E B R U A R Y	26	The House of Love	The House of Love	-
F E B R U A R Y	26	Mad Love	Lush	EP
F E B R U A R Y	27	Here in the Real World	Alan Jackson	-
F E B R U A R Y	27	Highwayman 2	The Highwaymen	-
F E B R U A R Y	27	Into the Mirror Black	Sanctuary	-
F E B R U A R Y	28	Ah Via Musicom	Eric Johnson	-
F E B R U A R Y	28	The Privilege of Power	Riot	-
F E B R U A R Y	?	Privilege	Television Personalities	-
F E B R U A R Y	?	Travel-Log	J.J. Cale	-
M A R C H	1	The Caution Horses	Cowboy Junkies	-
M A R C H	5	Just Say Ozzy	Ozzy Osbourne	Live EP
M A R C H	5	Backstreet Symphony	Thunder	Debut
M A R C H	5	Happiness	The Beloved	US
M A R C H	5	New Funky Nation	Boo-Yaa T.R.I.B.E.	-
M A R C H	5	10	The Stranglers	-
M A R C H	6	Birds of Passage	Bel Canto	US
M A R C H	6	Third World Warrior	Kris Kristofferson	-
M A R C H	9	House Party	Various Artists	Soundtrack
M A R C H	12	Bang!	Corey Hart	-
M A R C H	12	Beg to Differ	Prong	-
M A R C H	12	Changesbowie	David Bowie	Compilation
M A R C H	12	Eye	Robyn Hitchcock	US
M A R C H	12	I Do Not Want What I Haven't Got	Sinéad O'Connor	-
M A R C H	12	Manners & Physique	Adam Ant	-
M A R C H	12	Resistance	Borghesia	-
M A R C H	13	Funhouse	Kid 'n Play	-
M A R C H	13	My Romance	Carly Simon	Covers album
M A R C H	13	Pretty Woman	Various Artists	Soundtrack
M A R C H	16	Here at the Home	Tribe	-
M A R C H	16	Teenage Mutant Ninja Turtles: The Original Motion Picture Soundtrack	Various Artists	Soundtrack
M A R C H	19	Blacks' Magic	Salt-N-Pepa	-
M A R C H	19	Manic Nirvana	Robert Plant	-
M A R C H	19	Violator	Depeche Mode	-
M A R C H	20	Poison	Bell Biv DeVoe	Debut
M A R C H	20	Sex Packets	Digital Underground	Debut
M A R C H	20	Extricate	The Fall	US
M A R C H	20	Showtime	Nitzer Ebb	US
M A R C H	20	Swagger	Blue Aeroplanes	US
M A R C H	26	Brigade	Heart	-
M A R C H	26	Mental Floss for the Globe	Urban Dance Squad	US
M A R C H	26	Paintings in Yellow	Sandra	-
M A R C H	26	Still Got the Blues	Gary Moore	-
M A R C H	27	Livin' Like Hustlers	Above the Law	-
M A R C H	27	Forever Everlasting	Everlast	Debut
M A R C H	27	A View from 3rd Street	Jude Cole	-
M A R C H	27	Social Distortion	Social Distortion	-
M A R C H	27	Wilson Phillips	Wilson Phillips	Debut
M A R C H	29	Representing the Mambo	Little Feat	-
M A R C H	?	The Best of Van Morrison	Van Morrison	Compilation
M A R C H	?	Join Together	The Who	Live box set
M A R C H	?	Let Them Eat Bingo	Beats International	Debut

=== April–June ===
Date		Album	Artist	Notes
A P R I L	2	Bulkhead	Severed Heads	-
A P R I L	2	Unison	Celine Dion	Canada
A P R I L	3	Born to Sing	En Vogue	-
A P R I L	3	Chemicrazy	That Petrol Emotion	-
A P R I L	3	Lloyd Cole	Lloyd Cole	-
A P R I L	3	Read My Lips	Jimmy Somerville	-
A P R I L	9	Behind the Mask	Fleetwood Mac	-
A P R I L	10	Act III	Death Angel	-
A P R I L	10	Days of Open Hand	Suzanne Vega	-
A P R I L	10	Fear of a Black Planet	Public Enemy	-
A P R I L	10	Laura Branigan	Laura Branigan	-
A P R I L	10	Peace	Anything Box	-
A P R I L	10	People's Instinctive Travels and the Paths of Rhythm	A Tribe Called Quest	Debut
A P R I L	11	Vanity/Nemesis	Celtic Frost	-
A P R I L	13	39/Smooth	Green Day	Debut
A P R I L	16	Spanking Machine	Babes in Toyland	Debut
A P R I L	17	The Good Son	Nick Cave and the Bad Seeds	-
A P R I L	17	Johnny Gill	Johnny Gill	-
A P R I L	17	Last Decade Dead Century	Warrior Soul	Debut
A P R I L	17	Live on Broadway	Barry Manilow	Live
A P R I L	17	The Myth of Rock	Consolidated	-
A P R I L	17	Reading, Writing, and Arithmetic	The Sundays	US
A P R I L	17	Tennessee Woman	Tanya Tucker	-
A P R I L	18	My Blue Heaven	John Pizzarelli	-
A P R I L	19	Repeater	Fugazi	US
A P R I L	23	Songs for Drella	Lou Reed and John Cale	-
A P R I L	23	Hammerheart	Bathory	-
A P R I L	23	Let Them Eat Bingo	Beats International	US
A P R I L	23	Life	Inspiral Carpets	-
A P R I L	23	Metaphysical Graffiti	The Dead Milkmen	-
A P R I L	23	Slam	Big Dipper	-
A P R I L	23	Everybody Knows	Sonia	-
A P R I L	23	Now That's What I Call Music 17	Various Artists	UK; compilation
A P R I L	30	Charmed Life	Billy Idol	-
A P R I L	?	Lovegod	The Soup Dragons	-
A P R I L	?	Up in It	The Afghan Whigs	-
A P R I L	?	Closer to the Flame	Dave Edmunds	-
M A Y	1	When the Storm Comes Down	Flotsam and Jetsam	-
M A Y	1	The Winding Sheet	Mark Lanegan	-
M A Y	7	Son of Albert	Andrew Ridgeley	-
M A Y	8	Dreamland	Black Box	-
M A Y	8	Eclipse	Yngwie Malmsteen	US
M A Y	8	Goodbye Jumbo	World Party	-
M A Y	8	Greatest Hits	The Bangles	Compilation
M A Y	8	Shut Up and Dance	Paula Abdul	Remix album
M A Y	8	Tattooed Millionaire	Bruce Dickinson	-
M A Y	8	The Revival	Tony! Toni! Toné!	-
M A Y	8	Young Lions	Adrian Belew	-
M A Y	10	Steelheart	Steelheart	-
M A Y	14	Circle of One	Oleta Adams	Europe
M A Y	14	Love Moves	Kim Wilde	-
M A Y	14	Packed!	The Pretenders	-
M A Y	14	DAAS Icon	Doug Anthony All Stars	-
M A Y	15	Bloodletting	Concrete Blonde	-
M A Y	15	Corruption in Tokyo	Element Ethan	Japan; live
M A Y	15	Livin' It Up	George Strait	-
M A Y	15	Lock up the Wolves	Dio	-
M A Y	15	Reflections of Passion	Yanni	Compilation
M A Y	15	A Round and a Bout	Squeeze	US; live
M A Y	15	Stiletto	Lita Ford	-
M A Y	15	Ten	Y&T	-
M A Y	15	World Power	Snap!	Debut
M A Y	18	AmeriKKKa's Most Wanted	Ice Cube	Solo debut
M A Y	18	20 Años	Luis Miguel	-
M A Y	21	Amarok	Mike Oldfield	-
M A Y	21	She Hangs Brightly	Mazzy Star	-
M A Y	21	Vol. II: 1990 – A New Decade	Soul II Soul	-
M A Y	22	I'm Breathless	Madonna	Soundtrack
M A Y	22	Let the Rhythm Hit 'Em	Eric B. & Rakim	-
M A Y	22	Passion and Warfare	Steve Vai	-
M A Y	25	The Ghost in Science	Susumu Hirasawa	Japan
M A Y	25	Mecca	Age of Chance	US
M A Y	29	Natural History: The Very Best of Talk Talk	Talk Talk	Compilation
M A Y	29	Hell to Pay	Jeff Healey	Canada
M A Y	29	I Want Too Much	A House	US
M A Y	29	Katydids	Katydids	US
M A Y	29	Meet John Doe	John Doe	-
M A Y	29	Pod	The Breeders	-
M A Y	30	Screaming Life/Fopp	Soundgarden	Compilation
M A Y	30	Tangled	Jane Wiedlin	-
M A Y	31	All the Stuff (And More!) Volume 1	Ramones	Compilation
M A Y	31	All the Stuff (And More!) Volume 2	Ramones	Compilation
M A Y	?	1234	Propaganda	-
M A Y	?	Beers, Steers, and Queers	Revolting Cocks	-
M A Y	?	Black Sheets of Rain	Bob Mould	-
M A Y	?	The Internationale	Billy Bragg	Mini-LP
M A Y	?	Joe Cocker Live	Joe Cocker	Live
M A Y	?	Manscape	Wire	US
M A Y	?	Permanent Damage	The Icicle Works	-
J U N E	1	The Word as Law	Neurosis	-
J U N E	4	10	The Stranglers	US
J U N E	4	Gold Mother	James	-
J U N E	4	Left Hand Path	Entombed	Debut
J U N E	4	Stray	Aztec Camera	-
J U N E	5	Step by Step	New Kids on the Block	-
J U N E	7	Sumerian Cry	Tiamat	-
J U N E	11	Real Men... Wear Black	Cameo	-
J U N E	11	A Catholic Education	Teenage Fanclub	-
J U N E	11	Sings Cole Porter	Dionne Warwick	Cover
J U N E	11	Utd. State 90	808 State	-
J U N E	12	Armchair Theatre	Jeff Lynne	Solo debut
J U N E	12	Compositions	Anita Baker	-
J U N E	12	En las Buenas... y en las Malas	José José	-
J U N E	12	Holy Water	Bad Company	-
J U N E	12	I'll Give All My Love to You	Keith Sweat	-
J U N E	12	Mariah Carey	Mariah Carey	Debut
J U N E	13	I've Got That Old Feeling	Alison Krauss	-
J U N E	15	Sudden Stop	Colin James	Canada
J U N E	18	Alias	Alias	-
J U N E	18	Past to Present 1977-1990	Toto	Compilation+ 4 new tracks
J U N E	18	Turtle Soup	The Mock Turtles	UK
J U N E	19	A Night on the Town	Bruce Hornsby and the Range	-
J U N E	19	This Time Around	Green on Red	-
J U N E	20	Beyond Belief	Petra	-
J U N E	21	No Depression	Uncle Tupelo	Debut
J U N E	21	Wicked Beat	B'z	EP
J U N E	25	Brick by Brick	Iggy Pop	-
J U N E	25	Livonia	His Name Is Alive	-
J U N E	25	New Art Riot	Manic Street Preachers	EP
J U N E	25	Reputation	Dusty Springfield	-
J U N E	25	Stick It in Your Ear	Paul Laine	Japanese release date
J U N E	26	After the Rain	Nelson	-
J U N E	26	Danzig II: Lucifuge	Danzig	-
J U N E	26	Deicide	Deicide	Debut
J U N E	26	Goo	Sonic Youth	-
J U N E	26	Kiss of Life	Gene Loves Jezebel	-
J U N E	26	Live It Up	Crosby, Stills & Nash	-
J U N E	29	Black Angels	Kronos Quartet	-
J U N E	29	Bonafide	Maxi Priest	-
J U N E	?	Biohazard	Biohazard	-
J U N E	?	Busted	Cheap Trick	-
J U N E	?	Midnight Stroll	Robert Cray	-

=== July–September ===
Date		Album	Artist	Notes
J U L Y	2	Smooth Noodle Maps	Devo	-
J U L Y	3	The Hard Way	Steve Earle	-
J U L Y	3	Lights...Camera...Revolution!	Suicidal Tendencies	-
J U L Y	3	Lofty's Roach Souffle	Harry Connick Jr.	-
J U L Y	3	Seven Turns	The Allman Brothers Band	-
J U L Y	3	Spirits Dancing in the Flesh	Santana	-
J U L Y	3	We Are in Love	Harry Connick Jr.	-
J U L Y	10	Flesh & Blood	Poison	-
J U L Y	10	Live and Direct	Adamski	US
J U L Y	10	Pandemonium	The Time	-
J U L Y	13	Live'r Than God	Thee Hypnotics	US
J U L Y	16	Naked Thunder	Ian Gillan	-
J U L Y	16	Tales from the Twilight World	Blind Guardian	-
J U L Y	16	Bad of the Heart	George Lamond	Debut
J U L Y	17	Edutainment	Boogie Down Productions	-
J U L Y	22	Hornet Piñata	Didjits	-
J U L Y	23	Slave to the Thrill	Hurricane	-
J U L Y	24	Banned in the U.S.A.	2 Live Crew	-
J U L Y	24	Cowboys from Hell	Pantera	-
J U L Y	24	Goodnight L.A.	Magnum	-
J U L Y	24	In the Heart of the Young	Winger	-
J U L Y	24	Take a Look Around	Masta Ace	-
J U L Y	24	Un-Led-Ed	Dread Zeppelin	-
J U L Y	27	Bellybutton	Jellyfish	-
J U L Y	30	Harmony Corruption	Napalm Death	-
J U L Y	30	Joy Rides for Shut-Ins	Cavedogs	-
J U L Y	31	The Earth, a Small Man, His Dog and a Chicken	REO Speedwagon	-
J U L Y	31	Hell Is for Wimps	Newsboys	-
J U L Y	?	Never, Neverland	Annihilator	-
J U L Y	?	Smile	Ride	US
J U L Y	?	Ichabod and I	The Boo Radleys	-
A U G U S T	7	Blaze of Glory	Jon Bon Jovi	Young Guns II soundtrack
A U G U S T	7	Brother's Keeper	The Neville Brothers	-
A U G U S T	7	Enchanted	Marc Almond	US
A U G U S T	7	Head Down	Moev	US
A U G U S T	7	Extreme II: Pornograffitti	Extreme	-
A U G U S T	7	World Clique	Deee-Lite	-
A U G U S T	13	Bossanova	Pixies	-
A U G U S T	13	Then & Now	Asia	Compilation
A U G U S T	14	Apple	Mother Love Bone	-
A U G U S T	14	100 Miles and Runnin'	N.W.A	EP
A U G U S T	14	Cleopatra Grip	The Heart Throbs	US
A U G U S T	14	Pump Up the Volume	Various Artists	US; soundtrack
A U G U S T	14	Wanted: Dead or Alive	Kool G Rap & DJ Polo	-
A U G U S T	15	Louder Than Love	TKA	-
A U G U S T	17	Eaten Back To Life	Cannibal Corpse	-
A U G U S T	17	Red Moon	The Call	-
A U G U S T	20	FireHouse	FireHouse	-
A U G U S T	20	Graffiti Bridge	Prince	Soundtrack
A U G U S T	20	Liberty	Duran Duran	-
A U G U S T	20	Peace of Mind	Breathe	-
A U G U S T	20	Tyr	Black Sabbath	-
A U G U S T	21	Against the Law	Stryper	-
A U G U S T	21	Detonator	Ratt	-
A U G U S T	21	Persistence of Time	Anthrax	-
A U G U S T	21	Ritual de lo Habitual	Jane's Addiction	-
A U G U S T	27	No Fences	Garth Brooks	-
A U G U S T	27	Otis	Mojo Nixon	-
A U G U S T	28	Facelift	Alice in Chains	Debut
A U G U S T	28	Up from the Ashes	Don Dokken	-
A U G U S T	28	Time's Up	Living Colour	-
A U G U S T	28	Jordan: The Comeback	Prefab Sprout	US
A U G U S T	31	The Party	The Party	Debut
A U G U S T	31	So Much 2 Say	Take 6	-
A U G U S T	?	Caustic Grip	Front Line Assembly	-
S E P T E M B E R	3	Listen Without Prejudice Vol. 1	George Michael	
S E P T E M B E R	3	Paradise Discotheque	Crime & the City Solution	
S E P T E M B E R	4	Chronicles	Rush	Compilation
S E P T E M B E R	4	& Love for All	The Lilac Time	US
S E P T E M B E R	4	1978–1990	Go-Betweens	US; compilation
S E P T E M B E R	4	And the Horse They Rode in On	Soul Asylum	-
S E P T E M B E R	4	Empire	Queensrÿche	-
S E P T E M B E R	4	In Case You Didn't Feel Like Showing Up	Ministry	Live
S E P T E M B E R	4	The Neighborhood	Los Lobos	-
S E P T E M B E R	4	The Rembrandts	The Rembrandts	-
S E P T E M B E R	4	Rumor Has It	Reba McEntire	-
S E P T E M B E R	4	The Wild Places	Dan Fogelberg	-
S E P T E M B E R	7	The Cactus Revisited	3rd Bass	Remix
S E P T E M B E R	7	Two Fires	Jimmy Barnes	-
S E P T E M B E R	10	To The Extreme	Vanilla Ice	-
S E P T E M B E R	10	Boomania	Betty Boo	-
S E P T E M B E R	10	Ragged Glory	Neil Young and Crazy Horse	-
S E P T E M B E R	11	Cherry Pie	Warrant	-
S E P T E M B E R	11	Under the Red Sky	Bob Dylan	-
S E P T E M B E R	11	Dave Stewart and the Spiritual Cowboys	Dave Stewart and The Spiritual Cowboys	US
S E P T E M B E R	11	Glider	My Bloody Valentine	EP; US
S E P T E M B E R	11	Short Dog's in the House	Too Short	-
S E P T E M B E R	11	Soundtrack from Twin Peaks	Angelo Badalamenti	Soundtrack
S E P T E M B E R	11	Unison	Celine Dion	US
S E P T E M B E R	11	Home For Christmas	Dolly Parton	-
S E P T E M B E R	14	Armed Audio Warfare	Meat Beat Manifesto	US
S E P T E M B E R	14	Mama Said Knock You Out	LL Cool J	-
S E P T E M B E R	17	Heaven or Las Vegas	Cocteau Twins	-
S E P T E M B E R	17	Painkiller	Judas Priest	-
S E P T E M B E R	17	Romantic?	The Human League	–
S E P T E M B E R	17	Room to Roam	The Waterboys	-
S E P T E M B E R	17	Themes – Volume 2: August 82 – April 85	Simple Minds	Box set
S E P T E M B E R	17	Too Wicked	Aswad	-
S E P T E M B E R	17	The Wall Live in Berlin	Roger Waters	UK; live
S E P T E M B E R	18	Collected Works	Hunters & Collectors	US
S E P T E M B E R	18	In a Priest Driven Ambulance	The Flaming Lips	-
S E P T E M B E R	18	The Layla Sessions: 20th Anniversary Edition	Derek and the Dominos	Remix + unreleased material
S E P T E M B E R	18	Minnie 'n Me: Songs Just for Girls	Christa Larson	-
S E P T E M B E R	19	Cause of Death	Obituary	-
S E P T E M B E R	21	Lawn Boy	Phish	-
S E P T E M B E R	21	Nomads Indians Saints	Indigo Girls	-
S E P T E M B E R	24	The Razors Edge	AC/DC	-
S E P T E M B E R	24	Some People's Lives	Bette Midler	-
S E P T E M B E R	24	Experience	Mary's Danish	-
S E P T E M B E R	24	Rag and Bone Buffet: Rare Cuts and Leftovers	XTC	Rarities compilation
S E P T E M B E R	24	Rust in Peace	Megadeth	-
S E P T E M B E R	24	Space Bandits	Hawkwind	-
S E P T E M B E R	25	All Shook Down	The Replacements	-
S E P T E M B E R	25	Dear 23	The Posies	-
S E P T E M B E R	25	Doro	Doro	-
S E P T E M B E R	25	An Emotional Fish	An Emotional Fish	US
S E P T E M B E R	25	Family Style	The Vaughan Brothers (Stevie Ray and Jimmie)	-
S E P T E M B E R	25	Have You Seen Me Lately	Carly Simon	-
S E P T E M B E R	25	Hi-Five	Hi-Five	-
S E P T E M B E R	25	Superchunk	Superchunk	-
S E P T E M B E R	25	Third Eye	Redd Kross	-
S E P T E M B E R	25	Wild & Lonely	The Associates	US
S E P T E M B E R	25	Without a Net	Grateful Dead	Live
S E P T E M B E R	25	X	INXS	-
S E P T E M B E R	?	In the Blood	Londonbeat	-
S E P T E M B E R	?	The Last Temptation of Reid	Lard	Debut
S E P T E M B E R	?	It's... Madness	Madness	US;Compilation
S E P T E M B E R	?	Nu Thang	dc Talk	-

=== October–December ===
Date		Album	Artist	Notes
O C T O B E R	1	No Prayer for the Dying	Iron Maiden	-
O C T O B E R	1	Dr. Adamski's Musical Pharmacy	Adamski	-
O C T O B E R	1	Better Off Dead	Sodom	-
O C T O B E R	1	Hell's Ditch	The Pogues	–
O C T O B E R	1	Dannii	Dannii Minogue	-
O C T O B E R	1	Go West Young Man	Michael W. Smith	-
O C T O B E R	1	The La's	The La's	-
O C T O B E R	1	Exitos de Gloria Estefan	Gloria Estefan	Compilation
O C T O B E R	2	Crawdaddy	Darling Buds	US
O C T O B E R	2	New Inside	Tiffany	-
O C T O B E R	2	Rubáiyát: Elektra's 40th Anniversary	Various Artists	Compilation
O C T O B E R	5	Set the Booty Up Right	Fishbone	EP
O C T O B E R	5	This Is Our Music	Galaxie 500	-
O C T O B E R	5	Wrong Way Up	Brian Eno and John Cale	-
O C T O B E R	8	Anam	Clannad	-
O C T O B E R	8	Enlightenment	Van Morrison	UK
O C T O B E R	8	Ringo Starr and His All-Starr Band	Ringo Starr	Live
O C T O B E R	8	Themes – Volume 1: March 79 – April 82	Simple Minds	Box set
O C T O B E R	8	Themes – Volume 3: September 85 – June 87	Simple Minds	Box set
O C T O B E R	9	Change of Season	Hall & Oates	-
O C T O B E R	9	The Devil Made Me Do It	Paris	Debut
O C T O B E R	9	Edge of the Century	Styx	-
O C T O B E R	9	FUN '90	Mekons	EP
O C T O B E R	9	Girls, Girls, Girls	Elvis Costello	Compilation
O C T O B E R	9	Seasons in the Abyss	Slayer	-
O C T O B E R	9	Shooting Straight in the Dark	Mary Chapin Carpenter	-
O C T O B E R	9	Souls of Black	Testament	-
O C T O B E R	15	Bona Drag	Morrissey	Compilation
O C T O B E R	15	Nowhere	Ride	-
O C T O B E R	15	Remasters	Led Zeppelin	Compilation
O C T O B E R	15	The Rhythm of the Saints	Paul Simon	-
O C T O B E R	15	Sweetness and Light	Lush	EP
O C T O B E R	15	Themes – Volume 4: February 89 – May 90	Simple Minds	Box set
O C T O B E R	16	Back from Hell	Run-D.M.C.	-
O C T O B E R	16	Brand New Dance	Emmylou Harris	-
O C T O B E R	16	Hack	Information Society	-
O C T O B E R	16	Hope Chest: The Fredonia Recordings 1982–1983	10,000 Maniacs	Compilation
O C T O B E R	16	Hindu Love Gods	Hindu Love Gods	-
O C T O B E R	16	Hold Me Up	Goo Goo Dolls	-
O C T O B E R	16	Private Times...and the Whole 9!	Al B. Sure!	-
O C T O B E R	16	Recycler	ZZ Top	-
O C T O B E R	16	The Rhythm of the Saints	Paul Simon	-
O C T O B E R	16	The Geto Boys	Geto Boys	Remix
O C T O B E R	22	Slaves & Masters	Deep Purple	-
O C T O B E R	22	Behaviour	Pet Shop Boys	-
O C T O B E R	22	Heart Still Beating	Roxy Music	Live
O C T O B E R	22	Vision Thing	The Sisters of Mercy	-
O C T O B E R	22	The Greatest Hits, So Far	Public Image Ltd.	Compilation
O C T O B E R	22	Cure for Sanity	Pop Will Eat Itself	-
O C T O B E R	22	Kool-Aid	Big Audio Dynamite II	-
O C T O B E R	22	Move to This	Cathy Dennis	Debut
O C T O B E R	23	Led Zeppelin	Led Zeppelin	Boxed Set
O C T O B E R	23	458489	The Fall	US; compilation
O C T O B E R	23	Billy's Live Bait	Gear Daddies	-
O C T O B E R	23	Circle Slide	The Choir	-
O C T O B E R	23	Faith Hope Love	King's X	-
O C T O B E R	23	Life	Inspiral Carpets	US
O C T O B E R	23	Some Friendly	The Charlatans	US
O C T O B E R	23	Wicked Sensation	Lynch Mob	Debut
O C T O B E R	29	Choke	The Beautiful South	UK
O C T O B E R	29	Traveling Wilburys Vol. 3	Traveling Wilburys	-
O C T O B E R	30	Down To Earth	Monie Love	Debut
O C T O B E R	30	Ghost of a Dog	Edie Brickell & New Bohemians	-
O C T O B E R	30	If There Was a Way	Dwight Yoakam	-
O C T O B E R	30	Interiors	Rosanne Cash	-
O C T O B E R	30	Lennon	John Lennon	Box set
O C T O B E R	30	Red Hot + Blue	Various Artists	Cole Porter tribute
O C T O B E R	30	Taste of Chocolate	Big Daddy Kane	-
O C T O B E R	30	This Christmas	Patti LaBelle	Christmas
O C T O B E R	30	Too Dark Park	Skinny Puppy	-
O C T O B E R	31	Raygun... Naked Raygun	Naked Raygun	-
O C T O B E R	?	Strap It On	Helmet	Debut
O C T O B E R	?	Gling-Gló	Björk Guðmundsdóttir & tríó Guðmundar Ingólfssonar	-
N O V E M B E R	1	Ani DiFranco	Ani DiFranco	Debut
N O V E M B E R	5	Don't Explain	Robert Palmer	UK
N O V E M B E R	5	Serious Hits... Live!	Phil Collins	Live
N O V E M B E R	5	Tripping the Live Fantastic	Paul McCartney	Live
N O V E M B E R	5	Reverberation	Echo and the Bunnymen	-
N O V E M B E R	5	Refugees of the Heart	Steve Winwood	-
N O V E M B E R	5	Pills 'n' Thrills and Bellyaches	Happy Mondays	-
N O V E M B E R	6	Birdbrain	Buffalo Tom	-
N O V E M B E R	6	Cake	Trash Can Sinatras	-
N O V E M B E R	6	Coma of Souls	Kreator	-
N O V E M B E R	6	Crazy World	Scorpions	-
N O V E M B E R	6	The Dancing Years	Shriekback	-
N O V E M B E R	6	I'm Your Baby Tonight	Whitney Houston	-
N O V E M B E R	6	Put Yourself in My Shoes	Clint Black	-
N O V E M B E R	6	Somewhere Soon	The High	US
N O V E M B E R	6	Stick It Live	Slaughter	Live EP
N O V E M B E R	6	Syntonic	Kon Kan	US
N O V E M B E R	7	Risky	B'z	-
N O V E M B E R	8	To Be Continued	Elton John	Box set + 4 new tracks
N O V E M B E R	12	Ven Conmigo	Selena	-
N O V E M B E R	12	Rhythm of Love	Kylie Minogue	-
N O V E M B E R	13	Mermaids soundtrack	Various Artists	US; soundtrack
N O V E M B E R	13	Anything Is Possible	Debbie Gibson	-
N O V E M B E R	13	Blast the Human Flower	Danielle Dax	US
N O V E M B E R	13	Five Man Acoustical Jam	Tesla	Live
N O V E M B E R	13	Gala	Lush	US
N O V E M B E R	13	The Immaculate Collection	Madonna	Greatest hits + 2 new tracks
N O V E M B E R	13	Standards	The Alarm	US; Compilation
N O V E M B E R	15	Naïve	KMFDM	-
N O V E M B E R	16	GodWeenSatan: The Oneness	Ween	Debut
N O V E M B E R	19	Shaking the Tree	Peter Gabriel	Compilation
N O V E M B E R	20	Casino	Blue Rodeo	-
N O V E M B E R	20	Extremities, Dirt and Various Repressed Emotions	Killing Joke	-
N O V E M B E R	20	Ferociously Stoned	Cherry Poppin' Daddies	Debut
N O V E M B E R	20	Heartbreak Station	Cinderella	-
N O V E M B E R	20	Mixed Up	The Cure	UK; Remix album
N O V E M B E R	20	This Is a Collective	Consolidated	EP
N O V E M B E R	23	Against the Grain	Bad Religion	-
N O V E M B E R	26	A Social Grace	Psychotic Waltz	-
N O V E M B E R	27	Grits Sandwiches for Breakfast	Kid Rock	Debut
N O V E M B E R	27	Ralph Tresvant	Ralph Tresvant	Solo debut
N O V E M B E R	27	Rising	Donovan	Live
N O V E M B E R	27	Now! That's What I Call Music 18	Various Artists	UK; compilation
D E C E M B E R	2	Cold Hands	Boss Hog	-
D E C E M B E R	3	MCMXC a.D.	Enigma	Debut
D E C E M B E R	4	Grains of Sand	The Mission UK	US
D E C E M B E R	4	Home Alone	John Williams	Soundtrack
D E C E M B E R	4	One for All	Brand Nubian	Debut
D E C E M B E R	4	The Simpsons Sing the Blues	The Simpsons	Debut
D E C E M B E R	10	Live at Hammersmith '84	Jethro Tull	Live
D E C E M B E R	11	Devo's Greatest Hits	Devo	Compilation
D E C E M B E R	11	Devo's Greatest Misses	Devo	Compilation
D E C E M B E R	11	The Raw & the Remix	Fine Young Cannibals	Remixes and alternate versions
D E C E M B E R	18	Gonna Make You Sweat	C+C Music Factory	Debut
D E C E M B E R	18	Business as Usual	EPMD	-
D E C E M B E R	18	99%	Meat Beat Manifesto	-
D E C E M B E R	?	Obey the Time	The Durutti Column	-
D E C E M B E R	?	A Brief History of the Twentieth Century	Gang of Four	Compilation

=== Release date unknown ===
- 1888 – Death in June/Current 93
- 2nd Avenue – Idle Cure
- All That Jazz - Ella Fitzgerald
- Anonymous Bodies in an Empty Room – Swans
- Anonymous Confessions of a Lunatic Friend – Bryan Duncan
- The Apprentice – John Martyn
- Are You Okay? – Was (Not Was)
- As I Came of Age – Sarah Brightman
- Banking, Violence and the Inner Life Today – McCarthy
- Because It's Christmas – Barry Manilow
- Beyond Thee Infinite Beat – Psychic TV
- Blackman Know Yourself – Joe Higgs
- Blood Guts & Pussy – The Dwarves
- Blue Pacific – Michael Franks
- The Blues Brothers Band Live in Montreux – The Blues Brothers (live)
- Bluesiana Triangle – Dr. John
- Brand New Heavies – Brand New Heavies
- Career of Evil: The Metal Years – Blue Öyster Cult
- Chain Reaction – John Farnham
- Christmas, Like a Lullaby – John Denver (12/90)
- Classic Country Music: A Smithsonian Collection – Various Artists
- The Collection – Kenny G
- Concrete Jungle – Sway & King Tech
- Dare to Be Different – Tommy Emmanuel
- Debacle: The First Decade – Violent Femmes
- The Domino Club – The Men They Couldn't Hang
- Erpland – Ozric Tentacles
- Eucalyptus – Pitchfork
- Everybody Wants to Shag... The Teardrop Explodes – The Teardrop Explodes
- Evergreen Everblue – Raffi
- Fakebook – Yo La Tengo
- Fist Sized Chunks – Skin Yard
- The Flower That Shattered the Stone – John Denver (9/90)
- From a Scream to a Whisper – Lowlife
- Garista (re-release) – zoviet*france:
- Ghost – Ghost
- Gloryline – Dreams So Real
- Godhead – Lowlife
- Greatest Hits 1977–1990 – The Stranglers
- Groovy, Laidback and Nasty – Cabaret Voltaire
- Head - The Jesus Lizard
- Heartbeats Accelerating – Kate and Anna McGarrigle
- Hell with the Lid Off – MC 900 Ft. Jesus
- Here Comes Trouble – Scatterbrain
- High Wire – Ernie Isley
- Hispanic Causing Panic – Kid Frost (7/10/90)
- Holy Soldier – Holy Soldier
- Home – Hothouse Flowers
- Horse Opera – Riders in the Sky
- The House of Love – The House of Love
- Hot Chocolate Massage – Tiny Lights
- Iced Earth – Iced Earth (debut) – Released in Europe only (11/90)
- In Scarlet Storm – David Zaffiro
- Knock, Breathe, Shine – Jacob's Trouble
- Live at the China Club – Dramarama
- Live at the Roxy Club – Sham 69
- Lofcaudio – Mastedon
- Lost Souls – The Raindogs
- Love Is Strange – Kenny Rogers
- Lovers Who Wander – The Del-Lords
- The Lyrical Strength of One Street Poet – D-Boy Rodriguez
- The Massacre – The Exploited
- Craig McLachlan & Check 1–2 – Craig McLachlan & Check 1–2
- Meet Julie Miller – Julie Miller
- Mek We Dweet – Burning Spear
- Merci – Florent Pagny
- Midnight Radio – Big Head Todd and the Monsters
- Motive – Red Box
- Neighbourhood Threat – Johnny Crash (debut)
- Nineteen 90 – Regine Velasquez
- Once Dead – Vengeance Rising
- Other Voices – Paul Young (6/4/90)
- Oh Suzi Q. – Suzi Quatro
- Paintings in My Mind – Tommy Page
- Party of One – Nick Lowe
- Pentagram – Mezarkabul
- Plus Signs – Burton Cummings
- Powerhouse – White Heart
- Reflections – The Shadows (final studio album)
- Return to Samoa – Angry Samoans
- Rick Elias and the Confessions – Rick Elias
- Round the Outside, Round the Outside – Malcolm McLaren
- Sack Full of Silver – Thin White Rope
- Seasons of Love – Mad at the World
- Sewn to the Sky – Smog
- Shadow in Dreams – Dennis Rea
- Shake Your Soul – Baton Rouge
- Skellington – Julian Cope
- Skywriting – The Field Mice
- Slap! – Chumbawamba
- Slappy – Green Day
- Smoke 'Em If You Got 'Em – The Reverend Horton Heat
- Some Disenchanted Evening – The Verlaines
- Sons of Kyuss – Kyuss (debut)
- A Spy in the House of Love – The House of Love
- Sticks and Stones – The 77s
- Sunburn – Blake Babies
- Swerve – Giant Sand
- Sylentiger – Trytan
- Taking Drugs to Make Music to Take Drugs To – Spacemen 3
- Talisman – Talisman
- Ten Commandments – Ozzy Osbourne Compilation
- Toy Matinee – Toy Matinee
- Turned On – Rollins Band
- Unfun – Jawbreaker
- Unnatural History – Coil
- Untitled album by :$OVIET:FRANCE: – $OVIET:FRANCE: (re-release)
- The Vegetarians of Love – Bob Geldof
- Vehicle – The Clean
- Volume 2 – Reagan Youth
- Waiting for Cousteau – Jean Michel Jarre
- Weapons of our Warfare – Deliverance
- Women in the Room – Zachary Richard
- The Wonder – Tom Verlaine
- The Youth Are Getting Restless (live) – Bad Brains

== Biggest hit singles ==
The following songs achieved the highest positions in the charts of 1990.

#	Artist	Title	Year	Country	Chart Entries
1	Sinéad O'Connor	Nothing Compares 2 U	1990	(Republic of Ireland)	UK 1 - Jan 1990 (16 weeks), US Billboard 1 - Mar 1990 (21 weeks), ARC 1 of 1990 (peak 1 15 weeks), Japan (Tokyo) 1 - Mar 1990 (18 weeks), Holland 1 - Jan 1990 (16 weeks), Sweden 1 - Feb 1990 (12 weeks), Finland 1 for 1 week - Mar 1990, Austria 1 - Mar 1990 (5 months), Switzerland 1 - Feb 1990 (29 weeks), Norway 1 - Feb 1990 (16 weeks), Poland 1 - Mar 1990 (51 weeks), Belgium 1 - Feb 1990 (16 weeks), Italy 1 for 1 week - Mar 1990, Germany 1 - Feb 1990 (5 months), ODK Germany 1 - Feb 1990 (32 weeks) (11 weeks at number 1) (16 weeks in top 10), Eire 1 for 6 weeks - Jan 1990, Canada RPM 1 for 5 weeks - May 1990, New Zealand 1 for 5 weeks - Apr 1990, Australia 1 for 8 weeks - Feb 1990, Europe 1 for 5 weeks - Feb 1990, Germany 1 for 11 weeks - Mar 1990, Spain 1 for 1 week - Apr 1990, MTV Video of the year 1990, KROQ 1 of 1990, Grammy in 1990 (Nominated), US Platinum (certified by RIAA in Apr 1990), UK Platinum (certified by BPI in Mar 1990), US BB 3 of 1990, US Radio 3 of 1990 (peak 1 11 weeks), Australia 3 of 1990, Canada 3 of 1990, US CashBox 4 of 1990, Germany Gold (certified by BMieV in 1990), Brazil 5 of 1990, Switzerland 6 of 1990, Italy 8 of 1990, Europe 8 of the 1990s (1990), nuTsie 11 of 1990s, Germany 19 of the 1990s (peak 1 19 weeks), Holland free40 22 of 1990, UK Songs 2013-23 peak 30 - Jul 2023 (4 weeks), Japan (Osaku) 30 of 1990 (peak 5 17 weeks), Vinyl Surrender 48 (1990), Poland 59 of all time, Billboard 50th song 77, 55th Billboard 100 87 (1990), Belgium 90 of all time, Billboard100 92, DMDB 92 (1990), Acclaimed 113 (1990), OzNet 138, Rolling Stone 162, WXPN 661, UKMIX 800, RYM 9 of 1990
2	Madonna	Vogue	1990	(United States)	UK 1 - Apr 1990 (14 weeks), US Billboard 1 - Apr 1990 (24 weeks), US CashBox 1 of 1990, Japan (Tokyo) 1 - Apr 1990 (19 weeks), Sweden 1 - Apr 1990 (9 weeks), Finland 1 for 1 week - May 1990, Norway 1 - Apr 1990 (14 weeks), Poland 1 - Apr 1990 (23 weeks), Belgium 1 - Apr 1990 (14 weeks), Italy 1 for 2 weeks - May 1990, Canada RPM 1 for 3 weeks - Jun 1990, New Zealand 1 for 4 weeks - May 1990, Australia 1 for 5 weeks - May 1990, Europe 1 for 8 weeks - Apr 1990, Spain 1 for 1 week - Jun 1990, US 2 X Platinum (certified by RIAA in Jun 1990), ARC 2 of 1990 (peak 1 15 weeks), US Radio 2 of 1990 (peak 1 10 weeks), Holland 2 - Apr 1990 (10 weeks), Switzerland 2 - Apr 1990 (19 weeks), MTV Video of the year 1990 (Nominated), ODK Germany 4 - Apr 1990 (23 weeks) (10 weeks in top 10), Canada 4 of 1990, UK Gold (certified by BPI in May 1990), US BB 5 of 1990, Italy 5 of 1990, Germany 6 - Apr 1990 (4 months), France 7 - Apr 1990 (1 week), Austria 7 - May 1990 (3 months), POP 7 of 1990, Brazil 10 of 1990, Australia 10 of 1990, Japan (Osaku) 11 of 1990 (peak 1 19 weeks), Switzerland 12 of 1990, nuTsie 35 of 1990s, Germany 230 of the 1990s (peak 4 13 weeks), Acclaimed 521 (1990), UKMIX 714, OzNet 881, RYM 8 of 1990, Global 33 (5 M sold) - 1990, Party 181 of 2007
3	Londonbeat	I've Been Thinking About You	1990	(United Kingdom)	US Billboard 1 - Feb 1991 (19 weeks), Holland 1 - Aug 1990 (16 weeks), Sweden 1 - Sep 1990 (10 weeks), Finland 1 for 1 week - Dec 1990, Austria 1 - Oct 1990 (5 months), Switzerland 1 - Oct 1990 (22 weeks), Belgium 1 - Sep 1990 (14 weeks), Italy 1 for 3 weeks - Dec 1990, ODK Germany 1 - Sep 1990 (46 weeks) (2 weeks at number 1) (15 weeks in top 10), Canada RPM 1 for 2 weeks - Apr 1991, Australia 1 for 4 weeks - Feb 1991, Europe 1 for 9 weeks - Sep 1990, Germany 1 for 2 weeks - Oct 1990, Spain 1 for 1 week - Dec 1990, UK 2 - Sep 1990 (13 weeks), Norway 2 - Oct 1990 (9 weeks), Germany 2 - Jan 1991 (4 months), Australia 4 of 1991, US Gold (certified by RIAA in Sep 1991), Germany Gold (certified by BMieV in 1990), Italy 7 of 1990, Japan (Tokyo) 10 - Jan 1991 (19 weeks), France 10 - Oct 1990 (1 week), Brazil 10 of 1991, US Radio 13 of 1991 (peak 1 11 weeks), Canada 14 of 1991, Poland 15 - Nov 1990 (9 weeks), US CashBox 17 of 1991, Switzerland 26 of 1991, POP 29 of 1991, US BB 31 of 1991, ARC 35 of 1991 (peak 1 14 weeks), Germany 59 of the 1990s (peak 1 17 weeks), Japan (Osaku) 66 of 1991 (peak 7 16 weeks), UK Silver (certified by BPI in Oct 1990), RYM 166 of 1990
4	Vanilla Ice	Ice Ice Baby	1990	(United States)	UK 1 - Nov 1990 (15 weeks), US Billboard 1 - Sep 1990 (20 weeks), Holland 1 - Nov 1990 (13 weeks), Belgium 1 - Dec 1990 (14 weeks), Eire 1 for 1 week - Dec 1990, New Zealand 1 for 4 weeks - Dec 1990, Australia 1 for 3 weeks - Jan 1991, Europe 1 for 6 weeks - Dec 1990, Spain 1 for 1 week - Feb 1991, Sweden 2 - Nov 1990 (9 weeks), Switzerland 2 - Nov 1990 (20 weeks), Norway 2 - Dec 1990 (12 weeks), Germany 2 - Jan 1991 (4 months), ODK Germany 2 - Nov 1990 (25 weeks) (14 weeks in top 10), US Platinum (certified by RIAA in Oct 1990), UK Platinum (certified by BPI in Jan 1991), Austria 3 - Nov 1990 (5 months), Germany Gold (certified by BMieV in 1990), POP 4 of 1990, France 5 - Dec 1990 (1 week), Switzerland 9 of 1991, Japan (Tokyo) 10 - Oct 1990 (11 weeks), Australia 15 of 1991, ARC 19 of 1990 (peak 1 14 weeks), US CashBox 21 of 1990, US Radio 30 of 1990 (peak 1 9 weeks), US BB 45 of 1990, Italy 65 of 1991, Japan (Osaku) 70 of 1991 (peak 3 19 weeks), Germany 82 of the 1990s (peak 2 16 weeks), Canada 98 of 1990, UKMIX 474, RYM 188 of 1990, Party 42 of 2007
5	MC Hammer	U Can't Touch This	1990	(United States)	Holland 1 - Jul 1990 (13 weeks), Sweden 1 - Aug 1990 (5 weeks), Belgium 1 - Jul 1990 (13 weeks), Australia 1 of 1990, New Zealand 1 for 6 weeks - Jul 1990, Australia 1 for 5 weeks - Jul 1990, Europe 1 for 8 weeks - Aug 1990, Spain 1 for 1 week - Sep 1990, Japan (Tokyo) 2 - May 1990 (21 weeks), Switzerland 2 - Jul 1990 (17 weeks), ODK Germany 2 - Jul 1990 (25 weeks) (12 weeks in top 10), Grammy in 1990 (Nominated), UK 3 - Jun 1990 (16 weeks), Germany 3 - Jul 1990 (4 months), US Gold (certified by RIAA in Aug 2005), Germany Gold (certified by BMieV in 1990), Austria 5 - Aug 1990 (4 months), POP 5 of 1990, France 6 - Jun 1990 (2 weeks), Norway 6 - Aug 1990 (8 weeks), US Billboard 8 - Apr 1990 (17 weeks), US Radio 8 of 1990 (peak 1 12 weeks), Switzerland 15 of 1990, Scrobulate 18 of rap, Japan (Osaku) 29 of 1990 (peak 2 17 weeks), US CashBox 39 of 1990, US BB 55 of 1990, Canada 70 of 1990, nuTsie 72 of 1990s, Brazil 78 of 1990, Germany 147 of the 1990s (peak 2 15 weeks), RIAA 201, Acclaimed 1797 (1990), UK Silver (certified by BPI in Aug 1990), RYM 63 of 1990, Party 214 of 1999, one of the Rock and Roll Hall of Fame 500

== Top 40 chart hit singles ==
Song title	Artist(s)	Release date(s)	US	UK	Highest chart position	Other Chart Performance(s)
"A Dreams a Dream"	Soul II Soul	April 1990	86	6	1 (Greece)	See chart performance entry
"À toutes les filles..."	Félix Gray & Didier Barbelivien	May 1990	n/a	n/a	1 (France, Belgium)	See chart performance entry
"After the Rain"	Nelson	October 1990	6	n/a	6 (United States)	39 (US Billboard Album Rock Tracks)
"All I Wanna Do Is Make Love to You"	Heart	March 1990	2	8	1 (Australia, Canada)	See chart performance entry
"All or Nothing"	Milli Vanilli	January 1990	4	74	1 (New Zealand)	See chart performance entry
"All Together Now"	The Farm	November 1990	n/a	4	4 (United Kingdom)	See chart performance entry
"Alors regarde"	Patrick Bruel	September 1990	n/a	n/a	3 (France)	14 (Québec) – 16 (Europe [European Airplay Top 50]) – 20 (Europe [Eurochart Hot 100])
"Alright"	Janet Jackson	March 1990	4	20	4 (Netherlands, United States)	See chart performance entry
"The Anniversary Waltz" (Part One)	Status Quo	September 1990	n/a	2	2 (United Kingdom)	3 (Ireland) – 5 (Netherlands) – 9 (Austria) – 12 (Switzerland) – 13 (Belgium) – 17 (Germany) – 104 (Australia)
"The Anniversary Waltz" (Part Two)	Status Quo	December 1990	n/a	16	16 (United Kingdom)	14 (Ireland) – 33 (Belgium) – 66 (Netherlands)
"Are You Dreaming?"	Twenty 4 Seven	November 1990	n/a	17	4 (Switzerland)	See chart performance entry
"Around the Way Girl"	LL Cool J	November 1990	9	n/a	9 (United States)	1 (U.S. Billboard Hot Rap Songs) – 5 (U.S. Billboard Hot R&B/Hip Hop Songs) – 7 (U.S. Billboard Dance Club Songs) – 27 (New Zealand) – 45 (Australia)
"Avant de partir"	Roch Voisine	July 1990	n/a	n/a	7 (France)	12 (Québec) – 34 (Europe)
"Because I Love You"	Stevie B	September 1990	1	6	1 (United States)	See chart performance entry
"Been Caught Stealing"	Jane's Addiction	November 1990	n/a	34	24 (Ireland)	1 (US Billboard Alternative Songs) – 29 (US Billboard Hot Mainstream Rock Tracks) – 56 (Australia)
"Being Boring"	Pet Shop Boys	November 1990	n/a	20	5 (Finland, Italy)	See chart performance entry
"Better the Devil You Know"	Kylie Minogue	April 1990	n/a	2	2 (United Kingdom)	See chart performance entry
"Black Cat"	Janet Jackson	August 1990	1	15	1 (United States)	See chart performance entry
"Black Velvet"	Alannah Myles	Released in 1989; Charted in '89/'90	1	2	1 (4 countries)	See chart performance entry
"Blaze of Glory"	Bon Jovi	July 1990	1	13	1 (4 countries)	See chart performance entry
"Blue Savannah"	Erasure	January 1990	n/a	3	1 (Israel)	See chart performance entry
"Candy"	Iggy Pop	September 1990	28	67	9 (Australia)	See chart performance entry
"(Can't Live Without Your) Love and Affection"	Nelson	May 1990	1	54	1 (United States)	11 (Canada) – 20 (Australia) – 44 (New Zealand)
"Cherry Pie"	Warrant	August 1990	10	35	6 (Australia)	See chart performance entry
"Close to You"	Maxi Priest	May 1990	1	7	1 (United States)	See chart performance entry
"Club at the End of the Street"	Elton John	April 1990	28	47	12 (Canada)	See chart performance entry
"Come Back to Me"	Janet Jackson		2	20	2 (United States)	See chart performance entry
"Cradle of Love"	Billy Idol	April 1990	2	34	2 (United States)	See chart performance entry
"Crying in the Rain"	A-ha	June 1990	n/a	13	1 (Norway)	See chart performance entry
"Cult of Snap"	Snap!	September 1990	n/a	8	1 (Spain)	See chart performance entry
"The Dance"	Garth Brooks	April 1990	n/a	36	3 (Ireland)	1 (Canada Country Tracks, U.S. Billboard Hot Country Songs) – 31 (Scotland) – 89 (Europ)
"Dangerous"	Roxette	May 1990	2	6	2 (Canada, Denmark, United States)	See chart performance entry
"Disappear"	INXS	September 1990	8	21	1 (Canada)	See chart performance entry
"Do You Remember?"	Phil Collins	April 1990	4	n/a	1 (Canada)	See chart performance entry
"Doin' the Do"	Betty Boo	May 1990	90	7	3 (Australia)	See chart performance entry
"Don't Miss The Party Line"	Bizz Nizz	April 1990	n/a	7	7 (United Kingdom)	See chart performance entry
"Don't Wanna Fall in Love"	Jane Child	January 1990	2	22	2 (United States)	See chart performance entry
"Don't Worry"	Kim Appleby	October 1990	n/a	2	1 (Zimbabwe)	See chart performance entry
"Don't You Love Me"	49ers	March 1990	78	12	6 (Ireland)	See chart performance entry
"Doubleback"	ZZ Top	May 1990	n/a	29	9 (Sweden)	See chart performance entry
"Downtown Train"	Rod Stewart	Charted in '89/'90	3	10	1 (Canada)	See chart performance entry
"Dub Be Good to Me"	Beats International	January 1990	76	1	1 (Israel, United Kingdom)	See chart performance entry
"Enjoy the Silence"	Depeche Mode	February 1990	8	6	1 (Denmark, Spain)	See chart performance entry
"Epic"	Faith No More	January 1990	9	25	1 (Australia)	See chart performance entry
"Escapade"	Janet Jackson	January 1990	1	17	1 (Canada, United States)	See chart performance entry
"Falling"	Julee Cruise	Charted in '90,'91,'92	n/a	7	1 (Australia)	See chart performance entry
"Fantasy"	Black Box	October 1990	n/a	5	3 (Australia, Ireland)	See chart performance entry
"Forever"	Kiss	January 1990	8	65	8 (United States)	17 (US Billboard Mainstream Rock – 18 (Canada) – 73 (Australia)
"Freedom! '90"	George Michael	October 1990	8	28	1 (Canada, Zimbababwe)	See chart performance entry
"Friends In Low Places"	Garth Brooks	August 1990	n/a	36	3 (Ireland)	See chart performance entry
"Get Up! (Before the Night Is Over)"	Technotronic	January 1990	1	2	1 (6 countries	See chart performance entry
"Gonna Make You Sweat (Everybody Dance Now)"	C+C Music Factory	November 1990	1	3	1 (5 Countries)	See chart performance entry
"Groove Is in the Heart"	Deee-Lite	August 1990	4	2	1 (Australia)	See chart performance entry
"Hanky Panky"	Madonna	July 1990	10	2	1 (Finland)	See chart performance entry
"Happenin' All Over Again"	Lonnie Gordon	January 1990	n/a	4	3 (Ireland)	See chart performance entry
"Have You Seen Her"	MC Hammer	March 1990	4	8	2 (Ireland)	See chart performance entry
"Healing Hands"	Elton John	June 1990	13	45	1 (United Kingdom)	See chart performance entry
"Hear the Drummer (Get Wicked)"	Chad Jackson	February 1990	n/a	3	3 (Netherlands, United Kingdom)	See chart performance entry
"Heart of Stone"	Taylor Dayne	July 1990	12	n/a	4 (Canada)	1 (Canada Adult Contemporary) – 8 (U.S. Billboard Adult Contemporary) – 42 (Australia)
"Hello Afrika"	Dr. Alban	September 1990	n/a	n/a	1 (Austria)	See chart performance entry
"Here I Am (Come and Take Me)"	UB40	January 1990	7	46	3 (Australia)	See chart performance entry
"High Enough"	Damn Yankees	September 1990	3	81	3 (United States)	2 (US Billboard Album Rock Tracks) – 12 (Canada) – 24 (New Zealand) – 57 (Australia)
"Hold On"	En Vogue	March 1990	2	5	2 (United States)	See chart performance entry
"Hold On"	Wilson Phillips	February 1990	1	6	1 (United States)	See chart performance entry
Holy Smoke"	Iron Maiden	September 1990	n/a	3	3 (United Kingdom)	See chart performance entry
"How Am I Supposed to Live Without You"	Michael Bolton	Released in 1989; Charted in '89/'90	1	3	1 (Belgium, United States)	See chart performance entry
"How Can We Be Lovers?"	Michael Bolton	May 1990	3	10	2 (Canada)	See chart performance entry
"I Can't Stand It!"	Twenty 4 Seven	Released in 1989; Charted in '90/'91	n/a	7	1 (Europe, Italy)	See chart performance entry
"I Don't Have the Heart"	James Ingram	August 1990	1	n/a	1 (United States)	2 (US Billboard Adult Contemporary) – 53 (US Billboard Hot R&B/Hip-Hop Song) – 78 (Australia)
"I Don't Know Anybody Else"	Black Box	Released in 1989; Charted in '89/'90	23	4	1 (Finland)	See chart performance entry
"I Go to Extremes"	Billy Joel	January 1990	6	70	3 (Canada)	See chart performance entry
"I Promised Myself"	Nick Kamen	1990	n/a	50	1 (Austria, Sweden)	See chart performance entry
"I Saw Red"	Warrant	November 1990	10	n/a	10 (United Kingdom)	See chart performance entry
"I Still Haven't Found What I'm Looking For"	The Chimes	May 1990	n/a	6	2 (Norway)	See chart performance entry
"I Wanna Be Rich"	Calloway	May 1990	2	100	2 (United States)	See chart performance entry
"(I Wanna Give You) Devotion"	Nomad & MC Mikee Freedom	1990	n/a	2	1 (Greece)	See chart performance entry
"I Wish It Would Rain Down"	Phil Collins	May 1990	3	7	1 (Canada)	See chart performance entry
"Ice Ice Baby"	Vanilla Ice	August 1990	1	1	1 (9 Countries)	See chart performance entry
"If Wishes Came True"	Sweet Sensation	June 1990	1	n/a	1 (United States)	See chart performance entry
"I'll Be Your Baby Tonight"	Robert Palmer & UB40	October 1990	n/a	6	1 (New Zealand)	See chart performance entry
"I'll Be Your Everything"	Tommy Page	February 1990	1	53	1 (United States)	See chart performance entry
"I'll Be Your Shelter"	Taylor Dayne	March 1990	4	43	1 (Canada)	See chart performance entry
"I'll Never Fall in Love Again"	Deacon Blue	August 1990	n/a	2	2 (Ireland, United Kingdom)	72 (Netherlands)
"I'm Free"	The Soup Dragons & Junior Reid	1990	79	5	5 (United Kingdom)	See chart performance entry
"I'm Not in Love"	Will to Power	July 1990	2	1	1 (Canada, Ireland, UK)	See chart performance entry
"I'm Your Baby Tonight"	Whitney Houston	September 1990	1	5	1 (Greece, Italy, Portugal, US)	See chart performance entry
"Impulsive"	Wilson Phillips	October 1990	4	42	1 (Canada)	See chart performance entry
"Infinity"	Guru Josh	Released in 1989; Charted in 1990	n/a	5	1 (Spain)	See chart performance entry
"Insieme: 1992"	Toto Cutugno	1990	n/a	n/a	2 (Portugal, Switzerland)	See chart performance entry
"It Must Have Been Love"	Roxette	March 1990	1	3	1 (8 countries)	See chart performance entry
"It Takes Two"	Rod Stewart & Tina Turner	November 1990	n/a	5	1 (Denmark)	See chart performance entry
"It's Here"	Kim Wilde	April 1990	n/a	42	4 (Finland)	See chart performance entry
"It's On You"	M.C. Sar & The Real McCoy	Released in 1989; Charted in '89/'90	n/a	n/a	1 (Spain)	See chart performance entry
"Itsy Bitsy Teenie Weenie Yellow Polka Dot Bikini"	Bombalurina	July 1990	n/a	1	1 (Ireland, United Kingdom)	See chart performance entry
"I've Been Thinking About You"	Londonbeat	September 1990	1	2	1 (15 countries)	See chart performance entry
"Janie's Got a Gun"	Aerosmith	Released in 1989; Charted in '89/'90	4	76	1 (Australia)	See chart performance entry
"The Joker"	Steve Miller Band	August 1990; Released in 1974; Reissued in 1990	n/a	1	1 (4 countries)	See chart performance entry
"Jōnetsu no Bara"	The Blue Hearts					See chart performance entry
"Just Like Jesse James"	Cher	Released in 1989; Charted in '89/'90	8	11	8 (Canada, United States)	See chart performance entry
"Justify My Love"	Madonna	November 1990	1	2	1 (4 Countries)	See chart performance entry
"Keep It Together"	Madonna	January 1990	8	n/a	1 (Australia) with "Vogue"	See chart performance entry
"Keep On Running"	Milli Vanilli	November 1990	n/a	76	2 (Austria)	See chart performance entry
"Killer"	Adamski & Seal	March 1990	n/a	1	1 (Belgium, UK, Zimbabwe)	See chart performance entry
"King of Wishful Thinking"	Go West	July 1990	8	18	3 (Canada)	See chart performance entry
"Kingston Town"	UB40	March 1990	n/a	4	1 (France)	See chart performance entry
"Kinky Afro"	Happy Mondays	October 1990	n/a	5	5 (United Kingdom)	1 (US Billboard Alternative Airplay) – 22 (Europe) – 34 (New Zealand) – 63 (Australia)
"Let's Try It Again"	New Kids on the Block	September 1990	53	8	6 (Ireland)	See chart performance entry
"Listen to Your Heart"	Roxette	Released in 1988; Charted in '88,89,90	1	6	1 (Canada, United States)	See chart performance entry
"Listen to Your Heart"	Sonia	Released in 1989; Charted in '89/'90	n/a	10	10 (United Kingdom)	See chart performance entry
"Live Together"	Lisa Stansfield	February 1990	n/a	10	7 (Belgium)	See chart performance entry
"Love and Kisses"	Dannii Minogue	February 1990	n/a	8	4 (Australia)	15 (New Zealand) – 22 (Ireland) – 25 (Europe) – 48 (Belgium)
"Love Takes Time"	Mariah Carey	August 1990	1	37	1 (Canada, United States)	See chart performance entry
"Love Will Lead You Back"	Taylor Dayne	January 1990	1	69	1 (United States)	See chart performance entry
"Love Will Never Do (Without You)"	Janet Jackson	October 1990	1	34	2 (Canada, United States)	See chart performance entry
"Mary Had a Little Boy"	Snap!	December 1990	n/a	8	1 (Canada, Zimbabwe)	See chart performance entry
"Miles Away"	Winger	October 1990	12	56	12 (United States)	14 (US Billboard Mainstream Rock) – 44 (Canada) – 151 (Australia)
"Miracle"	Jon Bon Jovi	November 1990	12	29	8 (Australia)	See chart performance entry
"Mona (I Need You Baby)"	Craig McLachlan & Check 1-2	March 1990	n/a	2	2 (United Kingdom)	See chart performance entry
"Mélodie d'amour"	Kaoma					See chart performance entry
"More Than Words Can Say"	Alias	September 1990	2	n/a	1 (Canada)	See chart performance entry
"My, My, My"	Johnny Gill	May 1990	10	89	10 United States)	See chart performance entry
"Naked In The Rain"	Blue Pearl	June 1990	n/a	4	2 (Austria)	See chart performance entry
"No Coke"	Dr. Alban	November 1990	n/a	n/a	1 (Australia)	See chart performance entry
"No More Lies"	Michel'le	Released in 1989; Charted in '89/'90	7	78	7 (United States)	1 (US Billboard Dance Singles Sales) – 2 (US Billboard Hot R&B/Hip-Hop Songs) – 7 (US Billboard Dance Club Songs) – 153 (Australia)
"Nothing Compares 2 U"	Sinéad O'Connor	January 1990	1	1	1 (17 countries)	See chart performance entry
"Ooops Up"	Snap!	June 1990	35	5	1 (Greece)	See chart performance entry
"Opposites Attract"	Paula Abdul	Released in 1989; Charted in '89/'90	1	2	1 (Australia, Canada, US)	See chart performance entry
"The Other Side"	Aerosmith	June 1990	22	46	22 (Canada, United States)	1 (US Albums Rock Tracks)
"Pictures of You"	The Cure	March 1990	71	24	9 (Ireland)	See chart performance entry
"Play That Funky Music"	Vanilla Ice	November 1990	4	10	3 (Finland)	See chart performance entry
"Poison"	Bell Biv DeVoe	March 1990	3	19	3 (New Zealand)	See chart performance entry
"Policy of Truth"	Depeche Mode	May 1990	15	16	5 (Finland)	See chart performance entry
"The Power"	Snap!	January 1990	2	1	1 (7 countries)	See chart performance entry
"Pray"	MC Hammer	August 1990	2	8	2 (New Zealand, United States)	See chart performance entry
"Praying for Time"	George Michael	August 1990	1	6	1 (Canada, United States)	See chart performance entry
"Price of Love"	Bad English	March 1990	5	80	5 (United States)	See chart performance entry
"Release Me"	Wilson Phillips	June 1990	1	36	1 (Canada, United States)	See chart performance entry
"Ride On Time"	Black Box	Released in 1989; Charted in '89/'90	n/a	1	1 (Iceland, Ireland, UK)	See chart performance entry
"Right Here, Right Now"	Jesus Jones	September 1990	2	31	2 (United States)	See chart performance entry
"Roam"	The B-52's	Released in 1989; Charted in '89/'90	3	17	2 (New Zealand)	See chart performance entry
"Rockin' Over the Beat"	Technotronic	Released in 1989; Charted in '89/'90	95	9	9 (United States)	See chart performance entry
"Romeo"	Dino	September 1990	6	n/a	6 (United States)	32 (Canada) – 35 (US Billboard Hot Dance Music/Club Play) – 48 (New Zealand) – 69 (US Billboard Hot R&B Singles) – 105 (Australia)
"Sacrifice" (1990 reissue)	Elton John	May 1990; First released in 1989	18	55	2 (Europe, France)	See chart performance entry UK # 1 with "Healing Hands"
"Sadeness (Part I)"	Enigma	October 1990	5	1	1 (14 countries)	See chart performance entry
"Saviour's Day"	Cliff Richard	November 1990	n/a	1	1 (United Kingdom)	5 (Ireland) – 36 (Belgium) – 97 (Australia)
"Sensitivity"	Ralph Tresvant	October 1990	4	18	4 (United Kingdom)	1 (UK Dance) – 1 (US Billboard Hot R&B Singles) – 19 (US Billboard Hot Dance Club Play) – 62 (Australia)
"She Ain't Worth It"	Glenn Medeiros & Bobby Brown	May 1990	1	12	1 (United States)	See chart performance entry
"The Shoop Shoop Song (It's in His Kiss)"	Cher	November 1990	33	1	1 (7 countries)	See chart performance entry
"Show Me Heaven"	Maria McKee	June 1990	n/a	1	1 (Belgium, Netherlands, Norway, UK)	See chart performance entry
"Signs"	Tesla	November 1990	8	70	8 (United States)	2 (US Billboard Mainstream Rock) – 72 (Canada)
"So Close"	Hall & Oates	September 1990	11	69	4 (Canada)	6 (US Billboard Adult Contemporary) – 9 (US Radio & Records CHR/Pop Airplay Chart) – 106 (Australia)
"So Hard"	Pet Shop Boys	September 1990	62	4	1 (Finland)	See chart performance entry
"Soca Dance"	Charles D. Lewis	July 1990	n/a	n/a	1 (Belgium, France)	See chart performance entry
"Something Happened on the Way to Heaven"	Phil Collins	April 1990	4	15	1 (Canada)	See chart performance entry
"Something to Believe In"	Poison	September 1990	4	35	3 (Canada)	5 (US Billboard Mainstream Rock) – 38 (New Zealand) – 44 (Australia) – 98 (Europe)
"Steamy Windows"	Tina Turner	Released in 1989; Charted in '89/'90	39	13	5 (Belgium)	See chart performance entry
"Step by Step"	New Kids on the Block	September 1990	1	2	1 (Canada, Spain, United States)	See chart performance entry
"Step Back in Time"	Kylie Minogue	October 1990	n/a	4	4 (Finland, Ireland, UK)	See chart performance entry
"Step On"	Happy Mondays	March 1990	57	5	5 (United Kingdom)	See chart performance entry
"Still Got the Blues (For You)"	Gary Moore	April 1990	97	31	1 (Belgium)	See chart performance entry
"Sucker DJ (A Witch for Love)"	Dimples D.	November 1990	n/a	17	1 (Australia)	2 (New Zealand) – 8 (Netherlands) – 10 (Austria) – 16 (Germany) – 25 (Belgium)
"Suicide Blonde"	INXS	August 1990	9	11	1 (Canada, New Zealand)	See chart performance entry
"Tears on My Pillow"	Kylie Minogue	January 1990	n/a	1	1 (United Kingdom)	See chart performance entry
"Thieves in the Temple"	Prince	July 1990	6	7	3 (Denmark)	See chart performance entry
"This Beat Is Technotronic"	Technotronic	February 1990	n/a	14	5 (Finland, Ireland)	See chart performance entry
"Thunderstruck"	AC/DC	September 1990	n/a	13	1 (Finland)	See chart performance entry
"To Love Somebody"	Jimmy Somerville	November 1990	n/a	8	4 (Netherlands)	5 (New Zealand) – 11 (Switzerland) – 12 (Italy) – 15 (France) – 20 (Germany)
"Tom's Diner" (remix)	Suzanne Vega&DNA	July 1990	5	2	1 (Austria, European, Greece, Switzerland)	See chart performance entry
"Tonight"	New Kids on the Block	February 1990	7	3	3 (France, Netherlands, UK)	See chart performance entry
"Touch Me"	49ers	Released in 1989; Charted in '89/'90	n/a	3	3 (Finland, Greece, UK)	See chart performance entry
"Turtle Power!"	Partners In Kryme	April 1990	13	1	1 (United Kingdom)	See chart performance entry
"U Can't Touch This"	MC Hammer	May 1990	8	3	1 (6 countries)	See chart performance entry
"Unbelievable"	EMF	October 1990	1	3	1 (United States)	See chart performance entry
"Unchained Melody"	The Righteous Brothers	October 1990	19	1	1 (6 countries)	See chart performance entry
"Unskinny Bop"	Poison	June 1990	3	15	1 (Canada)	See chart performance entry
"Vision of Love"	Mariah Carey	May 1990	1	9	1 (Canada, New Zealand, United States)	See chart performance entry
"Vogue"	Madonna	March 1990	1	1	1 (30 countries)	See chart performance entry
"Volare"	Gipsy Kings	Released in 1989 charted in '89/'90	n/a	86	16 (France)	1 (US Billboard Hot Latin Songs) – 24 (Belgium, Italy) – 26 (Netherlands) – 90 (Australia)
"What I Am"	Edie Brickell & New Bohemians	Released in 1988; Charted in '88,'89,'90	7	31	1 (Canada)	See chart performance entry
"What it Takes"	Aerosmith	February 1990	9	n/a	9 (United States)	1 (US Billboard Album Rock Tracks) – 15 (Canada) – 19 (New Zealand) – 46 (Australia
"What Time Is Love?"	The KLF	August 1990	n/a	5	5 (United Kingdom)	See chart performance entry
"Where Are You Baby?"	Betty Boo	July 1990	n/a	3	3 (United Kingdom)	See chart performance entry
"Wicked Game"	Chris Isaak	Released in 1989; Charted in '89/'90	6	10	1 (Belgium)	See chart performance entry
"Wiggle It"	2 in a Room	November 1990	15	3	3 (Australia, Ireland, UK)	See chart performance entry
"With Every Beat of My Heart"	Taylor Dayne	Released in 1989; Charted in '89/'90	5	53	5 (Canada, United States)	See chart performance entry
"Without You"	Mötley Crüe	February 1990	8	39	8 (United States)	11 (US Billboard Mainstream Rock) – 46 (Australia)
"Words"	The Christians	Released in 1989 charted in '89/'90	n/a	18	1 (France)	See chart performance entry
"World in Motion"	England New Order	May 1990	n/a	1	1 (United Kingdom)	See chart performance entry
"World in My Eyes"	Depeche Mode	September 1990	52	17	2 (Denmark, Spain)	See chart performance entry
"You Make Me Feel (Mighty Real)"	Jimmy Somerville	January 1990	87	5	1 (Israel)	See chart performance entry

=== Other chart hit singles ===
- "The Age of Love" – Age of Love
- "Algo de mí en tu corazón" – Alejandro Lerner (ARG)
- "Baila Esta Cumbia" – Selena y Los Dinos (MEX)
- "Because I Love You (The Postman Song)" – Stevie B (#1 US, #2 CAN, #3 NLD)
- "Been Caught Stealing" – Jane's Addiction
- "Being Boring" – Pet Shop Boys (#3 FR, #4 Japan, #5 FIN)
- "Better the Devil You Know" – Kylie Minogue (#1 (ISR), #2 (UK), #4 (Australia)
- "Birdhouse In Your Soul" – They Might Be Giants (#6 UK)
- "Bird on the Wire" – The Neville Brothers
- "Blue Sky Mine" – Midnight Oil (#7 CAN, #8 Australia)
- "Bo le lavabo" – Lagaf' (#1 (FR))
- "Burbujas de Amor" – Juan Luis Guerra
- "C'est toi qui m'as fait" – François Feldman (#2 FR)
- "Chain Reaction" – John Farnham (#3 Australia)
- "De mí" – Charly García (ARG)
- "De Música Ligera" – Soda Stereo (#1 ARG)
- "Ding Dong" – Erste Allgemeine Verunsicherung
- "Do Me!" – Bell Biv DeVoe (#3 US)
- "El Cariño Es Como Una Flor" – Rudy La Scala (#1 US Latin)
- "Epic" – Faith No More (#1 Australia, #2 NZ)
- "Escapade" – Janet Jackson (#1 US, CAN)
- "Fais-moi une place" – Julien Clerc (#8 FR)
- "Falling" – Julee Cruise (#1 AUS, #2 SWE, #3 NOR)
- "Fantasy" – Black Box (#3 AUS, IRL, #4 AUT, #5 UK)
- "Forever" – Kiss (#8 US)
- "Freedom! '90" – George Michael (#1 (SP), #2 (UK), #6 (Australia, IRL))
- "Friends In Low Places" – Garth Brooks (#3 IRL)
- "Frente a Frente" – Chico & Roberta (#5 FR)
- "Get Up! (Before the Night Is Over)" – Technotronic (#1 BE, CAN, SP)
- "Gonna Make You Sweat (Everybody Dance Now)" – C+C Music Factory (#1 AUT, NLD, SWI, US)
- "Groove Is In The Heart" – Deee-Lite (#1 AUS, #2 UK, NZ #4 US)
- "Hacelo por mí" – Attaque 77 (#1 (ARG))
- "Hanky Panky" – Madonna (#1 FIN, #2 UK, #3 IRE, #5 ITA, #6 AUS, #10 US)
- "Happenin' All Over Again" – Lonnie Gordon
- "Have You Seen Her" – MC Hammer (#4 (US), #6 (FIN), #8 (UK))
- "Healing Hands" – Elton John
- "Hear the Drummer (Get Wicked)" – Chad Jackson (#3 UK, #5 NLD)
- "Heart of Stone" – Taylor Dayne
- "Hello Afrika" – Dr. Alban (#1 AUT, #2 GER, #3 SWI)
- "Here I Am (Come and Take Me)" – UB40 (#3 AUS, #6 NZ, #9 NLD)
- "Here We Are" – Gloria Estefan
- "High Enough" – Damn Yankees (#4 (POL))
- "Hijo de la Luna" – Mecano #3 (NLD))
- "Hiroshima" -Sandra (#4 GER, SWI)
- "Hold On" – En Vogue (#2 US, #5 UK)
- "Hold On" – Wilson Phillips (#1 US, #2 AUS, #3 CAN)
- "Holy Smoke" – Iron Maiden (#3 UK, #4 IRL)
- "How Am I Supposed to Live Without You" – Michael Bolton (#1 US, BE, #2 AUS)
- "How Can We Be Lovers?" – Michael Bolton
- "The Humpty Dance" – Digital Underground (#11 US)
- "I Can't Stand It!" – Twenty 4 Seven (#2 AUT, IT, SWI)
- "I Don't Have the Heart" – James Ingram
- "I Don't Know Anybody Else" – Black Box (#2 IRL, #3 SWI, #4 NOR, UK)
- "I Go to Extremes" – Billy Joel (#1 JAP, #3 CAN)
- "I Promised Myself" – Nick Kamen (#1 AUT, SWE, #3 SWI)
- "I Saw Red" – Warrant
- "I Still Haven't Found What I'm Looking For" – The Chimes (#2 NOR, #6 UK, IRL, NZ)
- "I Wanna Be Rich" – Calloway (#2 US)
- "(I Wanna Give You) Devotion" – Nomad & MC Mikee Freedom (#2 UK)
- "I Wish It Would Rain Down" – Phil Collins (#1 CAN, POL, #2 ZIM)
- "Ice Ice Baby" – Vanilla Ice
- "Ich hab' geträumt von dir" – Matthias Reim
- "If Wishes Came True" – Sweet Sensation (#1 US)
- "I'll Be Your Baby Tonight" – Robert Palmer & UB40 (#1 NZ, #4 AUS, #5 AUT, NLD, SWI)
- "I'll Be Your Everything" – Tommy Page (#1 US)
- "I'll Be Your Shelter" – Taylor Dayne (#1 CAN, #4 US, AUS)
- "I'll Never Fall in Love Again" – Deacon Blue (#2 UK, #2 IRL)
- "I'm Free" – The Soup Dragons & Junior Reid
- "I'm Not in Love" – Will to Power (#7 US, #8 NOR)
- "I'm Your Baby Tonight" – Whitney Houston (#1 IT, US, #2 BE, CAN, FIN, NLD)
- "Impulsive" – Wilson Phillips
- "Infinity" – Guru Josh (#1 SP, #2 BE, #3 NLD)
- "Jukebox in Siberia" – Skyhooks (#1 AUS)
- "Knockin' Boots" – Candyman
- "Lay Down Your Guns" – Jimmy Barnes (#4 AUS)
- "Le Jerk" – Thierry Hazard (#2 FR)
- "Les hommes qui passent" – Patricia Kaas (#7 FR)
- "Me siento mucho mejor" – Charly García
- "Maldòn (la musique dans la peau)" – Zouk Machine (#1 FR, #9 NLD)
- "Marie-Jeanne" – Michel Sardou (#2 FR)
- "Megamix" – Technotronic (#4 IRL, #6 UK, #7 SWI)
- "Mujer Amante" – Rata Blanca (ARG)
- "Nah Neh Nah" – Vaya Con Dios (#3 ISR, CZ, #4 NLD, SWI)
- "Obsesión" – Miguel Mateos (ARG)
- "Odoru Pompokolin" – B.B.Queens (#1 JPN)
- "On écrit sur les murs" – Demis Roussos (#4 FR)
- "Only on the Radio" – The Osborn Sisters
- "Oye Mi Canto (Hear My Voice)" – Gloria Estefan (#4 POL, #7 IRL, #9 NLD)
- "Petit Frank" – François Feldman (#1 FR)
- "Pourtant" – Roch Voisine (#3 FR)
- "Se bastasse una canzone" – Eros Ramazzotti (#2 BE, #4 NLD, #7 SWI)
- "Se Me Olvidó Otra Vez" – Maná (#5 US Latin)
- "Serious" – Duran Duran (# 3 ITA, #48 UK, #69 GER)
- "Spin That Wheel" - Hi Tek 3 & Ya Kid K
- "Star" - Erasure
- "Taiyō no Komachi Angel" – B'z (#1 JPN)
- "Tengo Todo Excepto a Tí" – Luis Miguel (#1 US Latin)
- "That's Freedom" – John Farnham (#6 AUS)
- "Un'estate italiana" – Edoardo Bennato & Gianna Nannini (#1 IT, SWI, #2 GER)
- "Verdammt, ich lieb' dich" – Matthias Reim (#1 AUT, BE, CRO, GER, NLD, POL, SWI)
- "Vous êtes fous!" – Benny B (#3 FR)
- "What's a Woman?" – Vaya Con Dios (#1 BE, NLD, #5 FR)
- "White and Black Blues" – Joëlle Ursull (#2 FR)
- "Y dale alegría a mi corazón" – Fito Paez (ARG)

== Notable singles ==
Song title	Artist(s)	Release date(s)	Other Chart Performance(s)
"100 Miles and Runnin'"	N.W.A	1990	2 (U.S Billboard Hot Rap Songs); 32 (New Zealand); 33 (Australia); 51 (U.S. Billboard Hot R&B/Hip-Hop Singles & Tracks)
"Being Boring"	Pet Shop Boys	November 1990	See chart performance entry
"Blue Savannah"	Erasure	January 1990	See chart performance entry
"Blue Sky Mine"	Midnight Oil	February 1990	See chart performance entry
"Birdhouse in Your Soul"	They Might Be Giants	January 1990	3 (U.S. Billboard Alternative Airplay); 6 (UK Singles Chart); 12 (Ireland); 125 (Australia)
"Can I Kick It?"	A Tribe Called Quest	October 1990	See chart performance entry
"De-Luxe"	Lush	March 1990	14 (U.S. Billboard Alternative Songs)
"Dig for Fire"	Pixies	October 1990	11 (US Billboard Modern Rock Tracks); 62 (UK Singles Chart)
"Dub Be Good to Me"	Beats International	January 1990	See chart performance entry
"Enjoy the Silence"	Depeche Mode	February 1990	See chart performance entry
"Hello"	The Beloved	January 1990	See Chart Performance Entry
"Heaven or Las Vegas"	Cocteau Twins	September 1990	9 (U.S. Billboard Alternative Airplay)
"Heavenly Pop Hit"	The Chills	March 1990	2 (New Zealand); 17 (U.S. Billboard Alternative Songs); 97 (UK Singles Chart); 118 (Australia)
"Here's Where the Story Ends"	The Sundays	January 1990	1 (U.S. Billboard Alternative Airplay)
"Holy Wars... The Punishment Due"	Megadeth	September 1990	See chart performance entry
"Iceblink Luck"	Cocteau Twins	August 1990	38 (UK Singles Chart)
"Joey"	Concrete Blonde	May 1990	See chart performance entry
"Killer" b/w "Bass Line Changed My Life"	Adamski featuring Seal	March 1990	See chart performance entry
"Kool Thing"	Sonic Youth	June 1990	7 (U.S. Billboard Alternative Airplay) 24 (Ireland); 81 (UK Singles Chart)
"Metropolis"	The Church	February 1990	1 (U.S. Billboard Alternative Airplay); 11 (U.S. Billboard Mainstream Rock); 19 (Australia); 41 (New Zealand)
"Never Enough"	The Cure	September 1990	See chart performance entry
"Nothing Compares 2 U"	Sinéad O'Connor	January 1990	See chart performance entry
"Pictures of You"	The Cure	March 1990	See chart performance entry
"Policy of Truth"	Depeche Mode	May 1990	See chart performance entry
"Shine On" (re-record)	The House of Love	January 1990	20 (UK Single Charts)
"The Ship Song"	Nick Cave and the Bad Seeds	March 1990	84 (UK Singles Chart)
"Soon" b/w "Glider"	My Bloody Valentine	April 1990	41 (UK Singles Chart)
"One Love"	The Stone Roses	July 1990	See chart performance entry
"Took the Children Away"	Archie Roach	September 1990	n/a
"Velouria"	Pixies	July 1990	4 (US Billboard Modern Rock Tracks); 28 (UK Singles Chart)
"The Only One I Know"	The Charlatans	May 1990	See chart performance entry
"The Weeping Song"	Nick Cave and the Bad Seeds	September 1990	n/a

=== Other notable singles ===
- "Alimony" (re-recording) – The Hummingbirds
- "Allison" – Pixies
- "All Different Things" – Bark Psychosis
- "Caroline" – Concrete Blonde
- "Daydreaming" – Massive Attack
- "Loaded" – Primal Scream
- "Looking for Atlantis" – Prefab Sprout
- "Planet" – The Sugarcubes
- "Story of My Life" – Social Distortion
- "True Fools Fall" – Died Pretty

== Top singles of 1990 ==
- United States: List of Billboard Hot 100 number ones of 1990
- Canada: List of number-one singles of 1990 (Canada)
- UK: 1990 in British music#Charts
- Japan: List of Oricon number-one singles of 1990

== Other significant singles ==
- "Little Fluffy Clouds" – The Orb (Sampling led to legal action.)
- Sampling copyright debate continues over the Soho single Hippychick, which uses a sample from How Soon Is Now? by The Smiths.

== Published popular music ==
- "Keep It Together" w.m. Stephen Bray & Madonna
- "The Simpsons theme song" m. Danny Elfman

== Top ten best albums of the year ==
All albums have been named albums of the year for their hits in the charts.

1. Depeche Mode – Violator
2. Pixies – Bossanova
3. Megadeth – Rust in Peace
4. Jane's Addiction – Ritual de lo Habitual
5. Cocteau Twins – Heaven Or Las Vegas
6. Ride – Nowhere
7. Public Enemy – Fear of a Black Planet
8. Happy Mondays – Pills 'n' Thrills and Bellyaches
9. Sonic Youth – Goo
10. The La's – The La's

== Album charts ==
- List of Canadian number-one albums of 1990

== Classical music ==
- Mario Davidovsky
  - Biblical Songs for soprano, flute, clarinet, violin, cello, and piano
  - Concertante for string quartet and orchestra
- Thomas Demenga – Solo per due, for cello and orchestra
- Lorenzo Ferrero
  - Cadenza, for clarinet and marimba
  - Discanto sulla musica sull'acqua di Handel
  - Four Modern Dances, for small orchestra
  - Musica per un paesaggio, for small orchestra
  - Rock my Tango, for piano solo
- Henryk Górecki
  - Good Night, Op. 63, for soprano, alto flute, piano and three tam-tams
  - Intermezzo, for piano
- John Harbison – The Flight into Egypt (cantata)
- Chris Harman – Iridescence, for 24 strings
- Paul Lansky – Smalltalk
- Alvin Lucier – Music for Piano with One or More Snare Drums
- Witold Lutosławski – Chantefleurs et chantefables for Soprano and Orchestra
- John McCabe – Flute Concerto
- James MacMillan
  - The Confession of Isobel Gowdie
  - The Berserking
- Meredith Monk – Book Of Days
- John Pickard – The Flight of Icarus
- Carl Vine – Piano Sonata No. 1
- Takashi Yoshimatsu – Symphony No. 1 Kamui-Chikap
- John Zorn – The Dead Man

== Opera ==
- Gerald Barry – The Intelligence Park
- Azio Corghi – Blimunda
- Mark Lanz Weiser – Purgatory (chamber opera, based on a play by William Butler Yeats)

== Musical theater ==
- Aspects of Love (Andrew Lloyd Webber) – Broadway production opened at the Broadhurst Theatre and ran for 377 performances
- Bran Nue Dae (Jimmy Chi)
- A Change in the Heir – Broadway production opened at the Edison Theatre and closed after only two weeks
- Five Guys Named Moe – London production
- Into the Woods London production opened on September 25 and ran for 197 performances. Starring Julia McKenzie and Imelda Staunton.
- Once on This Island – Broadway production opened at the Booth Theatre and ran for 469 performances
- Shogun – Broadway production opened at the Marquis Theatre and ran for 72 performances
- Sunday in the Park with George (Stephen Sondheim and James Lapine) – London production
- Truly Blessed – Broadway production opened at the Longacre Theatre and ran for one month

== Musical films ==
- Alissa in Concert
- Cry-Baby
- Graffiti Bridge
- His Highness Abdullah
- Thazhvaram

== Awards ==
- Country Music Hall of Fame Inductee: Tennessee Ernie Ford
- Rock and Roll Hall of Fame Inductees: Hank Ballard, Bobby Darin, The Four Seasons, The Four Tops, The Kinks, The Platters, Simon & Garfunkel and The Who
- 1990 Country Music Association Awards
- Grammy Awards of 1990
- Eurovision Song Contest 1990: Toto Cutugno
- Luc Ferrari wins the International Koussevitzky Prize for Recordings for his composition Histoire du plaisir et de la désolation
- Juno Awards: Best Composer: David Tyson/Christopher Ward
- Dalida is posthumously awarded the International Diploma by the "International Star Registry" (USA), three years after her death.
- Scottish composer Thomas Wilson is appointed a CBE.
- Kumar Sanu wins the Filmfare Best Male Playback Award
- Anuradha Paudwal wins the Filmfare Best Female Playback Award
- 32nd Japan Record Awards

=== Glenn Gould Prize ===
Glenn Gould Prize winner.

- Yehudi Menuhin (laureate)

== Music festivals ==
- In Australia, the Port Fairy Spring Music Festival is founded by Michael Easton and Len Vorster.

== Births ==
- January 9 – Di Genius, Jamaican singer, producer, and DJ
- January 10 – Nicolas Jaar, Chilean American composer and recording artist, works with FKA Twigs.
- January 14 – Grant Gustin, American actor and singer (Glee)
- January 22 – Logic (musician), American rapper, singer, songwriter, and record producer.
- January 25 – Thomas Berge, Dutch singer
- January 27 – Lydmor, Danish singer-songwriter
- January 28 – Ichiko Aoba, Japanese singer
- January 29 – MacKenzie Porter, Canadian country singer, songwriter, and actress.
- February 1 – Laura Marling, British folk-pop singer-songwriter
- February 3 – Sean Kingston, American-Jamaican R&B artist
- February 6
  - Georgia (musician), English record producer, songwriter, singer, rapper and drummer.
  - Mike Byrne, American drummer (The Smashing Pumpkins)
- February 10 – SooYoung, a member of nine-piece Korean pop girl group Girls' Generation
- February 16 – The Weeknd, Canadian singer-songwriter, rapper, and producer (Selena Gomez, Bella Hadid)
- February 18 – Choi Sung-Bong, Korean singer
- February 20 – Alemán, Mexican rapper
- February 28 – Olivia Jean, American singer, songwriter, and multi-instrumentalist. (She is known as the lead singer and guitarist of the all-female "garage goth" rock band, the Black Belles)
- March 9 – YG, American rapper
- March 13 – Klô Pelgag, Canadian singer from Quebec
- March 15 – Siobhan Magnus, American singer
- March 17
  - Hozier (musician), Irish singer-songwriter, musician and activist
  - Kai (Canadian singer), Canadian singer-songwriter (Flume)
- March 20 – Tessa Violet, American singer-songwriter, musician, activist and YouTuber
- March 21 – Erika de Casier, Portuguese-born Danish singer
- March 21 – Mandy Capristo, German singer and songwriter
- March 22
  - Claire Huangci, American pianist
  - Lisa Mitchell, English-born Australian singer-songwriter
- March 24 – Cleo Sol, British singer-songwriter
- March 26 – Xiumin, South Korean singer (EXO)
- March 27 – Kimbra, New Zealand singer-songwriter/guitarist
- March 29 – Kasey Smith, Irish singer (Wonderland)
- April 2 – Roscoe Dash, American rapper
- April 8 – Jonghyun, South Korean singer-songwriter, record producer and actor { Shinee } (D. 2017)
- April 10 – Maren Morris, American country music singer, songwriter, activist and record producer
- April 20 – Luhan, Chinese singer-songwriter
- April 21 – Nadya Dorofeeva, Ukrainian singer
- April 22 – Machine Gun Kelly (rapper), American rapper, singer, musician and actor (Megan Fox)
- April 24 – Carly Pearce, American country music singer and songwriter
- April 27 – Robin Bengtsson, Swedish singer
- April 29 – Loick Essien, British singer
- May 12
  - Etika, American YouTuber and Twitch streamer whose career started as a rapper (D. 2019)
  - Shungudzo, a Zimbabwean-American singer, songwriter, former gymnast, and reality television personality.
- May 14 – Sasha Spielberg, American actress and singer known by her stage name of Buzzy Lee.
- May 17
  - I_o (musician), American electronic dance music DJ and record producer. (D. 2020)
  - Kree Harrison, American singer
- May 26 – Nadia Oh, English singer, producer rapper, songwriter and model
- May 27 – Chris Colfer, American singer, author and actor
- May 30
  - YoonA, South Korean singer and actress, member of Girls' Generation
  - Phillipa Soo, American actress and singer.
- June 4 – Zac Farro, American musician, drummer, singer-songwriter and multi instrumentalist (Hayley Williams, Paramore)
- June 5 – DJ Mustard, American producer, DJ,
- June 6
  - Raisa Andriana, Indonesian singer
  - Mike G, American rapper (Odd Future)
- June 7 – Iggy Azalea, Australian rapper
- June 14 – Starrah, American songwriter, singer and rapper
- June 16 – John Newman (singer), English musician, singer, songwriter and record producer
- June 18 – Raleigh Ritchie, English actor, singer-songwriter, rapper, and record producer
- June 19
  - Jason Dy, Filipino singer
  - Moses Sumney, American singer-songwriter, musician
- June 20 – Iselin Solheim, Norwegian singer and songwriter
- June 23 – Sasami, American singer-songwriter and musician.
- June 25 – Makj, American dj
- June 27 - Aselin Debison, Canadian singer
- July 4 – Fredo Santana, American rapper (d.2018)
- July 6 – Meg Mac, Australian singer-songwriter and musician
- July 10 – Talay Riley, British singer-songwriter, producer
- July 12 – Maverick Sabre, British singer-songwriter
- July 15 – Olly Alexander, English singer-songwriter, musician, producer
- July 16
  - James Maslow, American actor, singer (Big Time Rush)
  - Paula Rojo, Spanish singer and songwriter.
  - Wizkid, Nigerian singer
  - C. Tangana, Spanish rapper, singer and songwriter (worked with Rosalía)
- July 19 – GFOTY, British EDM Pop singer with PC music
- July 23 – Dagny (singer), Norwegian pop singer
- July 24
  - Ben McKenzie, Australian Idol contestant, singer, actor
  - Jay McGuiness, British singer, songwriter and dancer, former member of The Wanted
- July 28 – Soulja Boy, American rapper
- July 29
  - Kat Dahlia Cuban-American R&B Latin Pop rapper, singer-songwriter and recording artist.
  - Shin Se-kyung, South Korean actress
- August – A.G. Cook, British singer-songwriter, music producer and former record label proprietor
- August 3 – Kang Min-kyung, South Korean singer (Davichi)
- August 13
  - Shila Amzah, Malaysian singer
  - Serrini – Hong Kong singer-songwriter
- August 15
  - Jennifer Lawrence, American singer/actress
  - BloodPop – American musician, record producer, and songwriter (Worked with Britney Spears, Ariana Grande, Madonna, Lady Gaga)
- August 16 – Rina Sawayama, Japanese-British singer-songwriter, activist and model.
- August 18 – Tommy Genesis, Canadian rapper, model and artist
- August 21 – Bo Burnham, American comedian and musician
- August 24 – Hiroki Kamemoto, Japanese guitarist (Glim Spanky)
- August 30 – Julia Jacklin, Australian singer-songwriter and musician
- September 3 – IZA, Brazilian singer-songwriter
- September 4
  - James Bay (singer), English singer-songwriter and guitarist
  - Stefanía Fernández, Venezuelan journalist, model and beauty queen
- September 6 – DPR Ian, Australian singer
- September 9 – Haley Reinhart, American singer and songwriter
- September 11 – Alex Cameron, Australian musician
- September 18 – Sam Perry (looping artist), Australian singer-songwriter and looping artist
- September 19 – Bjarki, Icelandic electronic music composer
- September 20 – Phillip Phillips, American jazz singer-songwriter, guitarist and sometime actor
- September 21 – Phoebe Ryan, American singer-songwriter
- September 22 – Sorcha Richardson, Irish singer-songwriter
- September 25 – Danny L Harle, British music producer and composer (PC Music)
- September 27 – Mitski, Japanese-American singer-songwriter and musician
- October 1 – Charlotte McDonnell, English singer-songwriter and guitarist (Chameleon Circuit)
- October 2 – Samantha Barks, A Manx singer and actress
- October 4 – Saki, Japanese guitarist and songwriter (Mary's Blood)
- October 5 – Taylour Paige, American singer and dancer
- October 7 – Seinabo Sey, Swedish recording artist and songwriter
- October 8 – Trent Harmon, American signer
- October 11 – Behzod Abduraimov, Uzbek classical pianist
- October 19
  - Jessica Meuse, American singer
  - Janet Leon, Swedish singer (Play)
- October 20 – Andrew Watt (record producer), American record producer, singer, musician, and songwriter (Miley Cyrus, Camilla Cabello, 5 Seconds Of Summer, Charlotte Lawrence)
- October 23 – Stan Walker, Australian-New Zealand singer-songwriter, activist, actor and television personality
- October 26 – Stu Mackenzie, Australian musician (King Gizzard & the Lizard Wizard)
- October 29 – Eric Saade, Swedish singer-songwriter
- October 31 – JID, American rapper and songwriter
- November 2 – Kendall Schmidt, American actor, singer (Big Time Rush, Hilary Duff)
- November 6 – Kris Wu, Canadian rapper
- November 7 – Matt Corby, Australian singer-songwriter
- November 9 – Chris Di Staulo, Italian-Canadian music video director (d. 2025)
- November 14 – DJ Suede the Remix God, American hip-hop record producer and songwriter
- November 18
  - Jackie Thomas, New Zealand singer
- November 24 – Tom Odell, English singer-songwriter
  - Myk Perez, Filipino singer
- November 26
  - Rita Ora, British singer
  - Chip, British rapper
  - tofubeats, Japanese singer, producer and DJ
- November 27 – blackbear, American rapper, producer, singer
- November 28 – Virgen Maria, Spanish DJ and record producer.
- December 11 – Hyolyn, Korean singer and dancer
- December 20
  - JoJo, American singer, songwriter, activist and actress
  - Bugzy Malone, English rapper
- December 21
  - Holiday Sidewinder, Australian singer-songwriter, musician and record producer
  - Taylor Louderman, American actress, singer, and dancer
- December 23 – Anna Maria Perez de Tagle, American singer and actress (Demi Lovato)
- December 26
  - Jon Bellion, American singer-songwriter, rapper, record producer
  - Illenium, American DJ and record producer
- December 28 – David Archuleta, Season 7 American Idol runner-up
- December 29 – Nightbirde, American singer-songwriter (d. 2022)

Unknown:

== Deaths ==
- January 3 – Arthur Gold, American pianist, 72
- January 7 – Jimmy Van Heusen, composer and songwriter, 77
- January 17 – Panka Pelishek, Bulgarian pianist and music teacher, 90
- January 18 – Melanie Appleby of British duo Mel and Kim, 23 (liver cancer)
- January 19 – Semprini, pianist and broadcaster, 81
- January 28 – Puma Jones, American singer, 36 (breast cancer)
- January 23 – Allen Collins, Lynyrd Skynyrd guitarist, 37 (complications from pneumonia)
- February 1 – Peter Racine Fricker, composer, 69
- February 2 – Mel Lewis, drummer and bandleader, 60 (cancer)
- February 8 – Del Shannon, singer-songwriter, 55 (suicide by shotgun)
- February 14 – Tony Holiday, German singer, 38 (AIDS-related illness)
- February 15 – George Suranovich, drummer (Love, Eric Burdon, Chuck Berry), 45 (heart attack)
- February 16 – Keith Haring, iconic graffiti artists and AIDS activist
- February 24 – Johnnie Ray, singer, 63 (liver failure)
- February 26 – Cornell Gunter, R&B singer, 53 (gunshot wound)
- March 6 – Mala, singer, 50
- March 11 – Muriel Dickson, operatic soprano, 86
- March 17 – Ric Grech, bassist (Family, Blind Faith), 43 (brain haemorrhage)
- March 19 – Andrew Wood, singer (Mother Love Bone), 24 (heroin overdose)
- April 3 – Sarah Vaughan, American jazz singer, 66 (lung cancer)
- April 9 – William Bradley Strickland, American composer, music publisher, and music educator, 60 (brain tumor)
- April 25 – Dexter Gordon, jazz saxophonist, 67
- May 1 – Sergio Franchi, Italian-American tenor/actor, 64 (brain cancer)
- May 8 – Luigi Nono, composer, 66
- May 16 – Sammy Davis, Jr., American entertainer, 64
- June 3 – Richard Sohl, pianist (Patti Smith Group), 37 (heart failure)
- June 4 – Stiv Bators, punk musician, 40 (concussion)
- June 6 – Joe Loss, English bandleader, 80
- June 14 – Erna Berger, operatic soprano, 89
- June 15 – Jim Hodder, Steely Dan drummer, 42 (drowning)
- June 16 – Dame Eva Turner, operatic soprano, 98
- June 21
  - June Christy, American singer, 64 (renal failure)
  - Elizabeth Harwood, operatic soprano, 52 (cancer)
- June 22 – Kripp Johnson, American singer (The Del-Vikings), 54
- June 25 – Peggy Glanville-Hicks, composer, 77
- July 2 – Snooky Lanson, American singer, 76
- July 7 – Cazuza, singer and composer, 32 (AIDS-related)
- July 15 – Trouble T Roy, hip-hop dancer, 22 (fall from stage)
- July 16 – Sidney Torch, pianist, cinema organist, conductor, orchestral arranger and composer
- July 18 – Gerry Boulet, Canadian singer-songwriter (Offenbach), 44 (colon cancer)
- July 26 – Brent Mydland, keyboardist (Grateful Dead), 37 (drug overdose)
- August 3 – M. Ranga Rao, Indian film composer and music director
- August 14 – Lafayette Leake, blues and jazz pianist, organist, vocalist and composer, 71
- August 15 – Viktor Tsoi, Russian singer of Kino, 28 (car accident)
- August 15 – Ingrid Lang-Fagerström, Swedish harpist, 92
- August 17 – Pearl Bailey, singer, 72
- August 27 – Stevie Ray Vaughan, American blues guitarist performer, 35 (helicopter crash)
- September 2 – Sari Biro, pianist, 78
- September 5 – Charley Charles, British drummer (The Blockheads), 45 (cancer)
- September 6 – Tom Fogerty (Creedence Clearwater Revival), 48 (AIDS-related)
- September 13 – Phil Napoleon, jazz trumpeter, 89
- October 3 – Eleanor Steber, operatic soprano, 76
- October 4 – Ray Stephens, a onetime member of The Village People, 35
- October 6
  - Asser Fagerström, pianist, composer and actor, 78
  - Danny Rodriguez, Christian rap artist, 22 (shot)
- October 8 – B. J. Wilson, drummer of Procol Harum, 43 (pneumonia after three years in a coma)
- October 14 – Leonard Bernstein, American composer and conductor, 72 (pneumonia and a pleural tumor)
- October 16
  - Art Blakey, jazz drummer, 71
  - Jorge Bolet, pianist, 75
- October 27 – Xavier Cugat, violinist, bandleader and arranger, 90
- October 31 – M. L. Vasanthakumari, Carnatic musician and playback singer, 62
- November 3 – Mary Martin, US singer and actress, 76
- November 10 – Ronnie Dyson, soul singer and actor
- December 2 – Aaron Copland, American composer
- December 7 – Dee Clark, American singer, 52 (heart attack)
- December 14 – Francisco Gabilondo Soler, Mexican singer and composer, 83
- December 17 – Olivia Bonelli, American soprano, 70
- December 18 – Paul Tortelier, French cellist, 76

== See also ==
- 1990 in music (UK)
- Record labels established in 1990
- Timeline of musical events
