= Minnie 'n Me =

Minnie Mouse Clubmouse

Minnie 'n Me was a 1990s merchandise branding program from The Walt Disney Company featuring Minnie Mouse in her childhood days, within the same continuity of the Topolino comics, Paperino Paperotto. Her companions within the merchandise included: Daisy Duck, Clarabelle Cow, Penelope "Penny" Pooch, Patti Pony, T.J. Turtle, Heather Hippo, Lilly Lamb, Minnie's dog Fifi the Peke and Daisy's kitten Trixie. Later on, Disney added Figaro, Mickey Mouse, and Donald Duck to the mix. This line of merchandise was mainly targeted towards preteen girls. Around 1991, Disney made 24 books titled the "Best Friend Collection."

On September 18, 1990, the "Minnie n Me: Songs Just for Girls" CD was released, featuring child vocalist Christa Larson.
