= Le Privilège =

1991 single by Michel Sardou

Single by Michel Sardou

from the album Le Privilège
- B-side: "Mademoiselle Louisiane"
- Released: 1991
- Recorded: 1990
- Studio: Studio Guillaume Tell
- Genre: Pop
- Length: 4:08
- Label: Trema
- Songwriters: Didier Barbelivien, Michel Sardou, Jacques Revaux
- Producer: Régis Talar

Michel Sardou singles chronology
"Marie-Jeanne" (1990)	"Le Privilège" (1991)	"Le Vétéran" (1991)

"Le Privilège" is a 1990 song about homosexuality by French singer Michel Sardou. Written by Didier Barbelivien and Sardou, it was released in February 1991 as the second single from Sardou's 18th studio album Le Privilège, shortly after the World Health Organization removed homosexuality from its list of diseases. Though the song was not a big hit, peaking at number 19 in France, it gave Sardou a more tolerant public image.

== Lyrics and theme ==
Lyrically, "Le Privilège" is about a homosexual young man who lives in a boarding school and who asks himself questions about his same-sex attractions; he thinks about his coming out to his parents and their possible reaction, ans concludes that his feelings are not a perversion.

In November 2012, Sardou said he was "of course" in favor of the same-sex marriage and explained that "Le Privilège" was written to denounce the confusion between homosexuality and perversion. In May 2013, in the context of the parliamentary debates about the same-sex marriage in France and the protests organized against it, he expressed again to Le Figaro his support for same-sex marriage and added that this law does not remove rights to others. The song was then described by French newspaper L'Obs as an "anthem for tolerance".

== Impact and legacy ==
In 2023, French newspaper Le Point ranked "Le Privilège" as Sardou's 15th best song, out of 323.

== Live performances ==
"Le Privilège" was sung during Sardou's concerts at Bercy in 1991 and 1993, at the Olympia in 1995, at the Palais des sports in 2005 and at the Olympia in 2013.

== Chart performance ==
In France, "Le Privilège" entered the singles chart at number 39 on the chart edition 16 February 1991, climbed regularly and peaked at number 19 in its sixth week, then dropped and fell off the top 50 after nine weeks. On the European Hot 100, it charted for three weeks, peaking in its second week at number 88, on 6 April 1991.

== Track listings ==
- CD single
1. "Le Privilège" — 4:09
2. "Mademoiselle Louisiane" — 4:45
- 7" single
1. "Le Privilège" — 4:09
2. "Mademoiselle Louisiane" — 4:45

== Charts ==
Chart (1991)	Peak position
Europe (European Hot 100)	88
France (SNEP)	19
