= Chad Jackson (DJ) =

English DJ, remixer and record producer

- Born: Mark Chadwick; 28 November 1960 (age 65); St Helens, Merseyside, England
- Origin: Manchester, England
- Occupations: Producer, DJ
- Instrument: Turntable
- Years active: 1987–present
- Label: Big Wave Records

Mark Chadwick (born 28 November 1969), better known by his stage name Chad Jackson, is an English DJ, remixer and record producer. He is best known for his hit single "Hear the Drummer (Get Wicked)", but he also created member-only mixes for the Disco Mix Club (DMC).

== Music career ==
Jackson was born in St Helens, Merseyside, England.

He won the DMC World Championships competition in 1987. His career started in 1990 with his debut single "Hear the Drummer (Get Wicked)", which consisted of samples. It was a hit, peaking at number 1 on the UK Dance Chart and number 3 on the UK Singles Chart. The track was based around a horn sample from Marva Whitney's 1969 single "Unwind Yourself" and also sampled the 1973 song "For the Love of Money" recorded by The O'Jays. However, his second single "Freedom to Party (Construction Mix)" failed to chart. He then made a remix of "I've Got You Under My Skin" by Frank Sinatra along with DJ Luca. It was released on Juno Records in 2011.

He has also performed under the pseudonym 'Drumscape'.

== Discography ==
=== EPs ===
- 1996: New Wave of Undergrounds (with GM)

=== Singles ===
- 1990: "Hear the Drummer (Get Wicked)" – UK No. 3
- 1990: "Freedom to Party (Construction Mix)"
- 1997: "Stay Calm"
- 2000: "Hear the Drummer Part Two"
- 2002: "Break"
- 2002: "Rock"
- 2005: "Do You Do Voodoo"
- 2005: "Get Yer Boogie On" / "Deep Organ"

Remixes

- 1990: Paula Abdul – "Cold Hearted" (Chad Jackson/12" Re-Mix)
- 2011: Frank Sinatra – "Under My Skin" (Chad Jackson and DJ Luca Remix)
