= 1990 in South Korean music =

The following is a list of notable events and releases that happened in 1990 in music in South Korea.

== Debuting and disbanded in 1990 ==
=== Groups ===
- 015B

=== Soloists ===
- Kang Susie
- Hyun Jin-young and Wawa
- Shin Hae-chul
- Shin Seung-hun
- Yoon Sang

=== Disbanded groups ===
- Sobangcha

== Releases in 1990 ==
=== January ===
Date	Title	Artist	Genre(s)
20	Reunion	Cho Yong-pil	Folk-pop

=== February ===
Date	Title	Artist	Genre(s)
1	Four	Sinawe	Heavy metal

=== March ===
Date	Title	Artist	Genre(s)
15	Kim Hyun-sik	Kim Hyun-sik	Folk rock

=== April ===
Date	Title	Artist	Genre(s)
1	Sexy Lady / Maybe It Was A Dream (single)	Hyun Jin-young and Wawa	Hip hop
—	Violent Fragrance	Kang Susie	K-pop

=== May ===
Date	Title	Artist	Genre(s)
1	Don't Put on a Sad Face	Shin Hae-chul	Rock

=== June ===
Date	Title	Artist	Genre(s)

=== July ===
Date	Title	Artist	Genre(s)
—	015B	015B	Pop ballad

=== August ===
Date	Title	Artist	Genre(s)
1	Jump '90	Min Hae-kyung	K-pop
1	New Dance 1	Hyun Jin-young and Wawa	Hip hop
20	Turning the Pages of Memories / Why Me	Lee Sun-hee	K-pop

=== September ===
Date	Title	Artist	Genre(s)
1	노을, 그리고 나 / Ballerina-Girl	Lee Seung-chul	Soft rock

=== October ===
Date	Title	Artist	Genre(s)

=== November ===
Date	Title	Artist	Genre(s)
1	Reflection of You in Your Smile	Shin Seung-hun	K-pop, Ballad
24	Farewell	Byun Jin-sub	K-pop
30	Vol. 1	Yoon Sang	Electronic

=== December ===
Date	Title	Artist	Genre(s)

== Deaths ==
- Kim Hyun-sik, aged 32. Singer, member of Spring Summer Fall Winter.
