= Manners & Physique =

Studio album by Adam Ant
- Released: March 12, 1990; 2009 (re-issue)
- Recorded: Spring 1989
- Studio: O'Henry Sound Studios, Burbank, California
- Genre: Pop; dance-pop
- Length: 44:34
- Label: MCA; MCA-6315 / Cherry Pop
- Producer: André Cymone

Adam Ant chronology
| Vive Le Rock (1985) | Manners & Physique (1990) | Antics in the Forbidden Zone (1990) |

Singles from Manners & Physique
- 1. "Room at the Top" Released: February 1990; 2. "Can't Set Rules About Love" Released: March 1990; 3. "Rough Stuff" Released: 1990

Manners & Physique is the fourth solo album by Adam Ant. It was released in 1990 by MCA Records. The single "Room at the Top" peaked at number 13 in the UK and number 17 in the United States. "Rough Stuff" (US) and "Can't Set Rules About Love" (UK) were released afterwards.

The album is dedicated to Ann Marie Dollard, Ant's "Dear Friend", 1956-1988. Dollard was Ant's acting agent who was killed in a riding accident.

In 2009, the album was re-released with remastered and bonus tracks.

The album peaked at No.19 in the UK and No.57 on the Billboard 200.

== Production ==
The album was recorded in California, and was produced by André Cymone. Ant is credited with writing or co-writing all the tracks on the album, mostly in partnership with guitarist Marco Pirroni or Cymone, who is credited with playing "Everything Else".

Ant later claimed that the album was styled after the bass heavy Minneapolis sound of which Cymone, in Ant's words, was "one of the architects".

Although the album was recorded in 1989, six of the tracks were written in 1986. One of these, the Manners & Physique title track, features lyrics from a 1986 composition, set to new music written by Cymone. The original demo, "Doggy Style," can be heard as a bonus track on later reissues of Vive Le Rock.

== Critical reception ==
Professional ratings
Review scores
| Source | Rating |
|---|---|
| AllMusic | 2/5 stars |
| The Encyclopedia of Popular Music | 2/5 stars |
| MusicHound Rock: The Essential Album Guide | 2.5/5 stars |
| The Rolling Stone Album Guide | 3/5 stars |
| Spin Alternative Record Guide | 2/10 |

Trouser Press called the album "confident and entertaining," writing that "walloping techno beats and monotonous funk-rock grooves occasionally dislocate the album’s pop spine, but Adam’s melodic vocals and ridiculous lyrics remain a reassuring constant." The Rolling Stone Album Guide wrote that it "traded on the skills of ex-Prince cohort Andre Cymone, whose production helped it work as a mix of British glamour-pop and Minneapolis R&B."

== Track listing ==
Side A
| No. | Title | Writer(s) | Length |
|---|---|---|---|
| 1. | "Room at the Top" | Adam Ant, Marco Pirroni, André Cymone | 4:43 |
| 2. | "Rough Stuff" | Ant, Cymone | 4:40 |
| 3. | "If You Keep On" | Ant, Kevin Rowland | 4:16 |
| 4. | "Manners & Physique" | Ant, Cymone | 3:30 |
| 5. | "Can't Set Rules About Love" | Ant, Pirroni | 4:43 |

Side B
| No. | Title | Writer(s) | Length |
|---|---|---|---|
| 6. | "U.S.S.A." | Ant | 4:27 |
| 7. | "Bright Lights Black Leather" | Ant | 5:22 |
| 8. | "Piccadilly" | Ant, Cymone | 4:52 |
| 9. | "Young Dumb and Full of It" | Ant, Pirroni | 3:32 |
| 10. | "Anger Inc." | Ant, Pirroni | 4:35 |
| Total length: | | | 44:34 |

2009 reissue bonus tracks
| No. | Title | Writer(s) | Length |
|---|---|---|---|
| 11. | "Bruce Lee" | Ant, Cymone | 4:48 |
| 12. | "Room at the Top (US Remix)" | Ant, Pirroni, Cymone | 6:50 |
| 13. | "Rough Stuff (7" Edit Of 12")" | Ant, Cymone | 4:13 |
| 14. | "Room at the Top (House Vocal)" | Ant, Pirroni, Cymone | 7:25 |
| 15. | "Rough Stuff (12" Vocal Remix)" | Ant, Cymone | 6:47 |

Tracks 11–15 are bonus tracks from various 7" and 12" releases. Tracks 12 and 14 remixed by Justin Strauss; tracks 13 and 15 remixed by Justin Strauss and Hugo Dwyer.

== Personnel ==
- Adam Ant – vocals
- Marco Pirroni – guitars, electric bass
- André Cymone – "everything else" (keyboards, synthesizers, electric & synth bass, drums, percussion, drum programming)
- Melanie Andrews – backing vocals on "Rough Stuff" and "Can't Set Rules About Love"

Technical

- André Cymone – production
- Dan Marnien – recording, engineering, mixing
- Sally Browther – assistant recording engineer
- Ryan Dorn – assistant mixing engineer
- Steve Hall – mastering
- Norman Moore – art direction, design
- Chris Cuffaro – photography

== Charts ==
| Chart (1990) | Peak position |
|---|---|
| Australian Albums (ARIA) | 138 |
| Canadian Albums Chart | 76 |
| UK Albums (Official Charts) | 19 |
| US Billboard 200 | 57 |
