= Marie-Jeanne (song) =

1990 single by Michel Sardou

Single by Michel Sardou

from the album Le Privilège
- B-side: "L'Award"
- Released: 1990
- Recorded: 1990
- Studio: Studio Guillaume Tell
- Genre: Pop
- Length: 4:56
- Label: Trema
- Songwriters: Didier Barbelivien, Michel Sardou, Jacques Revaux, Jean-Pierre Bourtayre
- Producer: Jacques Revaux

Michel Sardou singles chronology
"Attention les enfants... danger" (1989)	"Marie-Jeanne" (1990)	"Le Privilège" (1991)

"Marie-Jeanne" is a 1990 song by French singer Michel Sardou. Written by Didier Barbelivien and Sardou, it was released in September 1990 as the first single from Sardou's 18th studio album Le Privilège. It achieved a great success in France, peaking at number two.

== Lyrics and video ==
Elia Habib, an expert of French chart, explains that lyrically, Sardou "draws the portrait of Marie-Jeanne, whose childhood dreams, brilliant Eldorado of abundance, collide with her adult life, miserable and populated by crazy characters, straight out of a novel by Dostoyevsky. Widening the frame, [Sardou] sketches anonymous destinies and questions the irony of fate". The music video for "Marie-Jeanne" was directed by Didier Kaminka. Many friends of Sardou appear in the video, including, in order of appearance: Christine Lemler, Fiona Gélin, Cathy Andrieu (topless), Eddy Mitchell, Pierre Richard, Didier Barbelivien, Thierry Lhermitte and Mireille Darc.

== Live performances and uses ==
"Marie-Jeanne" was sung during Sardou's concerts at Bercy in 1991 and 1993, at the Olympia in 1995, at the Palais des sports in 2005. It was also used as the soundtrack for the 1990 film Promotion canapé, produced by Kaminka (who also directed the music video for "Marie-Jeanne") in which Sardou starred.

== Reception ==
Habib gave a positive review of the song, noting its "hammered rhythm" and that Sardou's "warm voice literally carries the melody that the chorus develops".

== Chart performance ==
In France, "Marie-Jeanne" entered the singles chart at number 46 on the chart edition 10 October 1990, then reached the top ten five weeks later. It peaked at number two in its 12th week, being able to dislodge Mecano's "Une femme avec une femme" which was atop for its seventh and last week, then dropped and remained for ten weeks in the top ten and 20 weeks in top 50. On the European Hot 100, it started at number 94 on 20 October 1990, peaked at number 14 in its 12th week, and fell off the chart after 16 weeks of presence. It was much played on radio and charted for six weeks on the European Airplay Top 50, with a peak at number 32 in its fourth week, on 22 December 1990.

== Track listings ==
- CD single
1. "Marie-Jeanne" — 4:56
2. "L'Award" — 4:09
- 7" single
1. "Marie-Jeanne" — 4:56
2. "L'Award" — 4:09

== Personnel ==
- Backing vocals – A. Calvert, Carole Fredericks, D. Davis, J.J. Cramier, M. Albert, M. Chevalier, Y. Jones
- Design concept – Jean-Philippe Bertrand
- Electric guitar – Slim Pezzin
- Engineer – B. Mylonas
- Engineer assistant – R. Letang
- Keyboards – P. Perathoner
- Photography – Richard Melloul
- Synthesizer – J. Parent

== Charts ==
Chart (1990–1991)	Peak position
Europe (European Airplay Top 50)	32
Europe (European Hot 100)	14
France (SNEP)	2
