= Metropolis (The Church song) =

1990 single by the Church

Single by the Church

from the album Gold Afternoon Fix
- B-side: "Much Too Much"; "Ride into the Sunset"; "Monday Morning"
- Released: 26 February 1990
- Studio: Ocean Way (Los Angeles)
- Length: 4:47
- Label: Mushroom (Australia); Arista (international)
- Songwriters: Steve Kilbey; Marty Willson-Piper; Peter Koppes; Richard Ploog
- Producers: The Church; Waddy Wachtel

The Church singles chronology
"Destination" (1988)	"Metropolis" (1990)	"Russian Autumn Heart" (1990)

"Metropolis" is a song by Australian alternative rock band the Church. It was released as the lead single from their sixth album, Gold Afternoon Fix (1990), and the songwriting credits were given to all four members of the band. The song topped the US Billboard Modern Rock Tracks chart and reached number 19 in Australia. A music video directed by David Hogan and produced by Chris O'Brien was made for the song.

== Background and composition ==
Marty Willson-Piper, Peter Koppes, Richard Ploog, and Steve Kilbey were all credited with writing the song. The lead guitar produced a quickly falling then softly ascending melody. A complicated web of guitar overdubs appears later in the song, and a soft, mandolin-sounding melody was added as an additional hook.

== Release and reception ==
"Metropolis" peaked at number one on the US Billboard Modern Rock Tracks chart and number 11 on the Album Rock Tracks chart in 1990. In addition, it peaked at number 19 in Australia and number 41 in New Zealand. Critically, Ned Raggett of AllMusic praised "the almost desperate edge in Steve Kilbey's vocals" as a testament to the song's quality. Raggett added that the Church's "ear for a triumphant yet somehow downbeat ending [makes] this an underrated gem in the band's body of work."

== Track listings ==
Australian and US 7-inch single

A. "Metropolis" – 4:44
B. "Much Too Much" – 4:46

Australian maxi-CD single

1. "Metropolis"
2. "Much Too Much"
3. "Ride into the Sunset"

UK 7-inch single

A. "Metropolis"
B. "Monday Morning"

UK and European maxi-CD single

1. "Metropolis" – 4:44
2. "Monday Morning" – 2:44
3. "Much Too Much" – 3:50

== Credits and personnel ==
Credits are lifted from the Australian 7-inch single and Gold Afternoon Fix liner notes.

Studios

- Recorded at Ocean Way Recording Studios (Los Angeles)
- Pre-produced at S.I.R. (Los Angeles) and Fat Boy Studios (Sydney, Australia)
- Mastered at Artisan Sound Recorders (Los Angeles)

Personnel

- The Church – production
  - Steve Kilbey – writing, vocals, bass, keyboards
  - Marty Willson-Piper – writing, guitar
  - Peter Koppes – writing, guitar
  - Richard Ploog – writing, drums
- Waddy Wachtel – production, mixing
- Shep Lonsdale – mixing, engineering
- Joe Schiff – assistant engineering
- Greg Fulginiti – mastering

== Charts ==
=== Weekly charts ===
Chart (1990)	Peak position
Australia (ARIA)	19
New Zealand (Recorded Music NZ)	41
US Album Rock Tracks (Billboard)	11
US Modern Rock Tracks (Billboard)	1

=== Year-end charts ===
Chart (1990)	Position
US Modern Rock Tracks (Billboard)	4

== Release history ==
Region	Date	Format(s)	Label(s)	Ref.
United States	26 February 1990	CD	Arista	
Australia	19 March 1990	7-inch vinyl; 12-inch vinyl; CD; cassette	Mushroom	

== Acoustic versions ==
The band performed the song, as well as "Under the Milky Way", for MTV Unplugged on 30 January 1990 at the National Video Center in New York City. The episode aired 18 March 1990. An acoustic version was included on the 2004 album El Momento Descuidado.
