= Gold Afternoon Fix =

Studio album by the Church
- Released: 9 April 1990
- Recorded: 1989
- Studio: Ocean Way (Hollywood)
- Genre: Alternative rock, neo-psychedelia, psychedelic rock, dream pop
- Length: 57:17
- Label: Mushroom (Australia); Arista (International)
- Producer: Waddy Wachtel and the Church

The Church chronology
Starfish (1988)	Gold Afternoon Fix (1990)	A Quick Smoke at Spot's: Archives 1986-1990 (1991)

Singles from Gold Afternoon Fix
- 1. "Metropolis" Released: 26 February 1990; 2. "Russian Autumn Heart" Released: August 1990; 3. "You're Still Beautiful" Released: 1990

Gold Afternoon Fix is the sixth album by the Australian alternative rock band the Church, released in April 1990. It was their second album for Arista Records in the US and was expected to capitalise and build on the success of 1988's Starfish. The album saw considerable promotion upon its release, but despite moderate success in the US, with the single "Metropolis" reaching the top of the Modern Rock Tracks chart, the release failed to deliver mass commercial appeal.

== Background and recording ==
Following their tour for the Starfish album in 1988, the band members went home for a four-month break before reconvening to begin work on the next album. Arista demanded demos of all the tracks before the official recording process could begin. These demos were recorded in Sydney at Fat Boy Studios by a young engineer by the name of Cameron Howlett. The band was tired of the material by the time the recording sessions commenced in late 1989. Further difficulties arose when the band wanted ex-Led Zeppelin bassist John Paul Jones to produce, but the record label wanted to team the band again with L.A. session musician Waddy Wachtel and engineer Greg Ladanyi, not wanting to change what had been a winning formula. Arista feared a Jones/Church collaboration might turn out too arty and non-commercial and vetoed the venerable musician in favour of the safer (and commercially tested) Wachtel, although Ladanyi was left out. Band members repeatedly noted how much they had disliked recording Starfish. That album's song "North, South, East And West" had been an indictment of Los Angeles' shallower aspects.

The recording sessions for the album were particularly fraught and in-band tensions led to drummer Richard Ploog being ostracised. While some of the bare, open sound that characterised Starfish punctuates the recording, the use of programmed drums instead of Ploog's live performances on all but four tracks resulted in the album being criticised as somewhat stiff and cold. According to biographer Robert Dean Lurie, the demo recordings for Gold Afternoon Fix were more successful than the finished album, despite their roughness. Ploog left the group for good following the recording and former Patti Smith Group drummer Jay Dee Daugherty was brought in for the tour.

Despite the album's title, Steve Kilbey was not yet using heroin at this point. He only started smoking (not fixing) the drug after the subsequent tour, having been introduced to it by Grant McLennan of the Go-Betweens. The title actually derives from a stock market term relating to the daily price which is set for gold.

The album is unique among the Church's releases in the absence of any 12-string electric guitar. The missing trademark sound was due to guitarist Marty Willson-Piper's 12-string Rickenbacker having been stolen during the previous tour.

I cringe every time I hear ‘Grind’. The irony of it all was that we were in session musician heaven in L.A. We recorded most of Starfish at The Complex Studios and the best drummers in the world were brushing past you every day – Russ Kunkel, Jeff Porcaro, Don Henley – and although we were at a different famous studio (Ocean Way), there would have been no problem hiring someone for a week to get the backing tracks down. But Waddy decided no, we should program all the drums on the songs that Richard hadn’t delivered, sitting in his producer chair banging out patterns on the little pads with his fingers, everything in perfect time but with awful clumsy drum rolls that sounded sonically flat. How did we go along with this approach with all our knowledge and experience? How did this come about when we were always so uncompromising when it came to our music? What the hell happened?

— Marty Willson-Piper

Professional ratings
Review scores
Source	Rating
AllMusic	4/5 stars
Rolling Stone	4/5 stars
The Rolling Stone Album Guide	4/5 stars

== Track listing ==
All songs written by Kilbey/Koppes/Ploog/Willson-Piper except where noted.

1. "Pharaoh" (3:54)
2. "Metropolis" (4:44)
3. "Terra Nova Cain" (Kilbey/Willson-Piper) (5:10)
4. "City" (3:22)
5. "Monday Morning" (2:47)
6. "Russian Autumn Heart" (4:08)
7. "Essence" (5:16)
8. "You're Still Beautiful" (3:09)
9. "Disappointment" (Kilbey/Koppes/Willson-Piper) (6:13)
10. "Transient" (Kilbey/Koppes/Willson-Piper) (4:27)
11. "Laughing" (4:35)
12. "Fading Away" (3:38)
13. "Grind" (6:07)

A 3-track EP entitled Megalopolis was included with U.S. promo copies, which contained:

1. "Metropolis" (4:44)
2. "Monday Morning (edit)" (2:44)
3. "Much Too Much" (3:50)

=== 2005 EMI Australia Remaster ===
This edition included a second disc which contained:

1. "Much Too Much" (3:52)
2. "Take It Back" (4:04)
3. "Desert" (2:50)
4. "Forgotten Reign" (4:21)
5. "Dream" (2:57)
6. "Ride Into The Sunset" (Kilbey/Koppes) (4:32)
7. "You Got Off Light" (3:30)
8. "The Feast" (Kilbey/Jansson/Koppes/Ploog/Willson-Piper) (4:49)
9. "Metropolis (acoustic)" (4:19)
10. "Grind (acoustic)" (5:38)
- All of these tracks, except the two acoustic versions, had appeared on the 1991 rarities compilation A Quick Smoke at Spot's: Archives 1986-1990.

== Personnel ==
- Steve Kilbey: lead vocals, bass guitar, keyboards
- Peter Koppes: guitars, lead vocal on "Transient"
- Marty Willson-Piper: guitars, lead vocal on "Russian Autumn Heart"
- Richard Ploog: drums, percussion (1, 5, 6 & 9)
