= Olivia Bonelli =

American operatic soprano (1920–1990)

- Born: July 2, 1920; Troy, New York
- Died: December 17, 1990 (aged 70); Park Ridge, New Jersey
- Other name: Olivia Bonelli Ortell
- Education: Emma Willard Conservatory of Music
- Occupations: Operatic soprano; voice teacher
- Spouse: George J. Ortell (m. 1950)

Olivia Bonelli, also known by her married name Olivia Bonelli Ortell, (July 2, 1920– December 17, 1990) was an American operatic soprano. She studied at the Emma Willard Conservatory of Music in her native town of Troy, New York, and privately with teachers in New York City and Italy. She was a leading soprano with several New York based opera companies during the 1950s and 1960s; including the New York City Opera, the New York Festival Opera, and the Brooklyn Opera Company. She also performed with American regional opera companies and sang in oratorios on the concert stage. After retiring from the stage she was active as a voice teacher in New Jersey.

== Early life and career ==
The daughter of Louis Bonelli and Concetta Bonelli (nee Riccardi), Olivia Bonelli was born in Troy, New York on July 2, 1920. In her youth she studied music at the Emma Willard Conservatory of Music; a music school in Troy affiliated with the Emma Willard School. She graduated from Catholic Central School in Troy (later relocated to Latham) and Troy Business College before studying singing in New York City. In 1950 she married George J. Ortell.

Bonelli's first experience as a singer was as a member of the choir at St. Anthony of Padua in Troy where she also her first solos. During World War II she spent a year traveling with the United Service Organizations, entertaining wounded World War II servicemen in hospitals across the USA. She began her professional career as a chorus girl at Radio City Music Hall (RCHM) in 1945-1946. There her talent was noticed and she was promoted into a leading star. She was a featured singer at RCHM by the summer of 1946. She starred in the more than 100 performances of the RCHM's Christmas nativity show. After this she was active as a soloist in concerts with the Troy Vocal Society in the early 1950s.

== Opera career ==
Bonelli studied opera in Italy in 1955. That same year she was soloist in a concert at The Town Hall featuring the music of composer Ariadna Mikeshina. In 1956 she made her debut with the New York City Opera (NYCO) in Carlisle Floyd's Susannah. In May 1958 she performed as a soloist in the New York premiere of Luigi Cherubini's Missa Solemnis in D minor with the Dessoff Choirs and the National Orchestral Association at Carnegie Hall. Also in 1958 she performed the roles of Gilda in Rigoletto, Musetta in La bohème, and Violetta in Verdi's La traviata on national tour with the New York Opera Festival (NYOF) company.

Bonelli repeated the role Violetta for a television version of La traviata broadcast on the American Broadcasting Company program Music for a Summer Night in August 1959 with William Lewis as Alfredo. That same year she performed the role of Cio-Cio-San in Madama Butterfly at the Southern Vermont Arts Center (SVAC), and on tour with the NYOF. In 1960 she sang Violetta with the Brooklyn Opera Company at the Brooklyn Academy of Music with Robert Merrill as Germont, and returned to SVAC as Mimì in Puccini's La bohème with Enrico Di Giuseppe as Rodolfo. She also toured as Mimì that year with the NYOF opposite Rudolf Petrak as Rodolfo and Dolores Wilson as Musetta.

In 1961 Bonelli portrayed Micaëla in Bizet's Carmen with the Connecticut Opera Association and Claramae Turner in the title role, and repeated the role of Puccini's Mimì with the Brooklyn Opera Company under the baton of Carlo Moresco. In 1962 she sang the role of the Archangel in the world premiere of Earl Wild's oratorio Revelations which was filmed for television broadcast on ABC. That same year she toured once again with the NYOF as Verdi's Violetta with Brian Sullivan as Alfredo. In 1963 & 1964 she returned to the NYCO to sing the role of Mimì with Michele Molese as Roldolfo and Anne Elgar Kopta as Musetta; a role she repeated the Dayton Opera in 1963. She was also seen with the NYCO in 1964 as Micaëla to the Carmen of Beverly Wolff/

In March 1964 Bonelli performed Gilda to Frank Porretta's Duke of Mantua and Benjamin Rayson's Rigoletto with the Honolulu Symphony Orchestra at the Hawaii Opera Festival. In the summer of 1964 she portrayed Rosalinda in Die Fledermaus with the Cincinnati Opera. After this she sang with the Metropolitan Opera for a special reading performance of Marvin David Levy's Mourning Becomes Electra while the opera was in development. She also gave performances with Chattanooga Opera and Toledo Opera during her performance career which did not continue beyond the 1960s.

== Later life and death ==
In 1974 Bonelli joined the voice faculty of the DiDio Music Institute in Westwood, New Jersey. In addition to teaching singing in her later life she was active as singer at religious services held at Our Lady of Mercy Church in Park Ridge, New Jersey.

Bonelli died on December 17, 1990 in Park Ridge at the age of 70.
