= Hear the Drummer (Get Wicked) =

Single by Chad Jackson
- Released: February 1990
- Recorded: 1990
- Genre: House
- Label: Big Wave
- Songwriters: Chad Jackson; DJ Mark the 45 King
- Producers: Chad Jackson; Steve Mac; Dave Norman

Chad Jackson singles chronology
"Freedom to Party (Construction Mix)" (1990)	"Hear the Drummer (Get Wicked)" (1990)	"Stay Calm" (1997)

"Hear the Drummer (Get Wicked)" is a song by English DJ Chad Jackson, released in 1990. It consists of samples, and peaked at No. 3 on the UK Singles Chart. The song was co-produced by Steve Mac.

The song itself has been sampled by Deekline in "Party People" (1999), by rapper Skepta in the song "Skepta" from Microphone Champion (2009), and by EDM duo Firebeatz in the song "Wicked" (2013).

== Samples used ==
This is an incomplete list of samples used in "Hear the Drummer (Get Wicked)".

- Marva Whitney - "Unwind Yourself" 1967
- Afrikaa Bambaataa and James Brown - "Unity" from Unity, 1984 (12")
- Afrique - "House of Rising Funk" from Soul Makossa, 1973 (LP)
- Bobby Byrd - "Hot Pants - I'm Coming, I'm Coming, I'm Coming" from Hot Pants - I'm Coming, I'm Coming, I'm Coming, 1972 (7")
- Gang Starr - "Movin' On" from Movin' On, 1988 (12")
- Hijack - "The Badman Is Robbin'" from The Badman Is Robbin', 1989 (12")
- Kool & the Gang - "Chocolate Buttermilk" from Kool and the Gang, 1969 (LP)
- Kool & the Gang - "Give It Up" from Kool and the Gang, 1969 (LP)
- The O'Jays - "For the Love of Money" from Ship Ahoy, 1973 (LP)
- Public Enemy - "Welcome to the Terrordome" from Fear of a Black Planet, 1990 (LP)
- Soul II Soul - a cappella version of "Back to Life" from Club Classics Vol. One, 1989 (LP)
- Uptown - "Dope on Plastic" from Dope on Plastic, 1989 (12")

== Charts ==
=== Weekly charts ===
Chart (1990–91)	Peak position
Australia (ARIA Charts)	145
Belgium (Ultratop 50 Flanders)	10
Europe (Eurochart Hot 100)	7
Luxembourg (Radio Luxembourg)	2
Netherlands (Dutch Top 40)	3
Netherlands (Single Top 100)	5
UK Singles (OCC)	3
US Dance Club Songs (Billboard)	27

=== Year-end charts ===
Chart (1990)	Position
Belgium (Ultratop Flanders)	89
Netherlands (Dutch Top 40)	51
Netherlands (Single Top 100)	70
UK Club Chart (Record Mirror)	52
