= Christa Collins =

American singer

- Born: Christa Larson; July 4, 1979 (age 47); Iowa, United States
- Origin: Los Angeles, California
- Genres: Rock and roll, garage rock, alternative rock
- Occupations: Singer, dancer, model, songwriter
- Instrument: Vocals
- Years active: 1990–present

Christa Larson Collins (born July 4, 1979) is a Swedish American singer, dancer, model, and songwriter. She was the first artist signed to Disney Records as a child. She is a designer for limited edition hair accessories and feather fascinators and participated in Season 1 of The X Factor, making it to the judges houses before being eliminated.

Born in Iowa, she expressed an interest in becoming a Marine biologist as a child. Christa is shy when she is not performing. Christa Larson is the youngest daughter of Michael Larson and the late Denise DeCero Larson. As a young child, Christa lived in St. Louis, but after turning down the opportunity to be on Broadway she, her parents, and her older sister moved to California. Christa began modeling when she was 6.

== Career ==
=== In Disney ===
As Disney's first child recording artist and a prototype for a multimillion-dollar marketing campaign, launched by a newly formed Disney Records, Christa Larson released her debut album Minnie 'n Me: Songs Just for Girls in 1990. That same year she performed in the 1990 Disney Parks Christmas Day Parade with Amy Grant. She performed in a guest appearance on Michael Jackson's "Heal the World" in 1991.

On May 9, 1991, while Christa was on tour in Australia promoting her debut album, she got sick. When they passed by a hospital, her mother, Denise Larson, wanted to go inside to see if they could make an appointment for her daughter. While she was crossing the street, she was run over by a male driver, who fled the scene and was never found. Denise died from her injuries. Christa was eventually dropped from Disney Records and her second album was shelved. Her father is now remarried to his third wife. After losing her mother who was also her manager Larson effectively left show business in 1992. After Denise died, Christa dropped out of high school. Christa later married Rik Collins.

=== In Woolly Bandits ===
After staying away from performances for a long time, Collins returned to the stage as the front woman of the rock and roll band Woolly Bandits. The band released "Woman of Mass Destruction" in 2009 to positive reviews and became KROQ radio DJ Rodney Bingenheimer's favorite new band and album.

Collins also sang "Can't Seem to Make You Mine" alongside Billy Corgan (Smashing Pumpkins) at the 2009 memorial of Sky Saxon, The Seeds founder.

=== In The X Factor ===
Collins applied for the first season of The X Factor USA. During the Top 100 stage of the competition, Collins sang "Chasing Cars" by Snow Patrol along with group members Henri Bredouw, Hannah Jackson, Emma Henry, Ryan Sims, The Brewers, and Kyle Corr. Later, she was chosen to be one of the eight acts for the "over-30s" category that would advance to the judges' houses. For one of her performances at the judges' houses stage, she sang "No Surprises" by Radiohead. However, she did not pass through to the top 17.

== Discography ==
=== Albums ===
- 1990: Minnie 'n Me: Songs Just for Girls (Disney Records)
- 2009: Woman of Mass Destruction (Citation Records)
- 2013: All Caught Up in You EP (self-released)

=== Appearances ===
- 1991: Ending solo vocals on Michael Jackson's "Heal the World" (MJJ Productions Inc., 1991)

== Music videos ==
- 1990: The Girls on Minnie Street (Disney Records)
- 1990: The Girls on Minnie Street Sing-A-Long (Disney Records)
