= 1992 in music =

This is a list of notable events in music that took place in the year 1992.

== Specific locations ==
- 1992 in British music
- 1992 in Norwegian music
- 1992 in Scandinavian music
- 1992 in South Korean music

== Specific genres ==
- 1992 in country music
- 1992 in heavy metal music
- 1992 in hip-hop
- 1992 in jazz
- 1992 in Latin music
- 1992 in progressive rock

== Events ==
=== January–February ===
- January 11
  - Nirvana's Nevermind album goes to No. 1 in the US Billboard 200 chart, establishing the widespread popularity of Grunge in the 1990s.
  - Paul Simon is the first major artist to tour South Africa after the end of the United Nations cultural boycott.
- January 16 – Mick Jagger attends the Hollywood première of his new movie, Freejack, at Mann's Chinese Theatre.
- January 25 – The inaugural Big Day Out festival takes place in Sydney, Australia, headlined by Violent Femmes and Nirvana.
- January 28 – The annual American Music Awards are held in Los Angeles.
- February 5 – New Kids on the Block interrupt their tour to perform on The Arsenio Hall Show in response to rumors that the group lip-synchs its concerts.
- February 16 – Slavic music is featured at the Oulu Music Festival, with concerts and opera productions in Oulu, Finland, until February 26.
- February 18 – Vince Neil leaves Mötley Crüe after 11 years as the band's lead singer, to spend more time on his career as a racing car driver.
- February 24
  - Nirvana's Kurt Cobain marries Hole's Courtney Love.
  - The U.S. Postal Service unveils two potential designs for its proposed Elvis Presley postage stamp for fans to vote on. One design is of a young, 1950s Elvis, and the other is of a much older, 1970s Elvis. The young Elvis wins the vote, and the stamp is issued the following January.
- February 25
  - Six major record companies reach an agreement to phase out the longbox form of compact disc packaging by April 1993, due to complaints that the packaging is environmentally wasteful.
  - The 34th Annual Grammy Awards are presented in New York, hosted by Whoopi Goldberg. Natalie Cole's Unforgettable... with Love wins Album of the Year, while her "virtual duet" cover of "Unforgettable" with her late father, Nat King Cole, wins both Record of the Year and Song of the Year. Marc Cohn wins Best New Artist.

=== March–April ===
- March 10 – At the 1992 Soul Train Music Awards, Prince wins the "Heritage" award for lifetime achievement.
- March 14 – Farm Aid Five takes place in Irving, Texas, USA, hosted by Willie Nelson. Artists performing at the event include John Mellencamp, Neil Young and Paul Simon. Approximately 40,000 people attend the event.
- March 16 – Mariah Carey performs at MTV Unplugged, shows critics her 5-octave range, and gets rave reviews.
- March 24 – A judge in Chicago, Illinois, USA, approves cash rebates of up to US$3 to anyone proving they bought Milli-Vanilli recordings prior to the beginning of the lip synching scandal on November 27, 1990.
- April 1 – Billy Idol, on trial for punching a woman in the face, pleads no contest. Idol is fined and ordered to make public service announcements against alcohol and drug abuse.
- April 20 – The Freddie Mercury Tribute Concert takes place at Wembley Stadium in London, England. All proceeds go to AIDS research.
- April 24 – David Bowie marries fashion model Iman.
- April 30 – In Los Angeles, California, USA, Madonna's bustier is stolen from a display in Frederick's of Hollywood. A US$1,000 reward is offered for its return.

=== May–June ===
- May 6
  - The first Europäisches Jugendchorfestival,(EJCF) (European Festival of Youth Choirs) is held in Basel, Switzerland. Organizers decide to make it a triennial event.
  - Rob Halford announces he is leaving Judas Priest.
  - Selena releases her album Entre A Mi Mundo which contains her first No. 1 hit, "Como La Flor".
- May 7 – John Frusciante of the Red Hot Chili Peppers leaves the band prior to the publication of a Rolling Stone magazine cover featuring them; he has to be digitally edited out of the photo. Frusciante returned to the Red Hot Chili Peppers in 1998.
- May 9 – The 1992 Eurovision Song Contest, held at Malmö Isstadion in Malmö, Sweden, is won by Ireland's Linda Martin with the song "Why Me?", written by 1980 and 1987 winner Johnny Logan.
- May 11 – A. R. Rahman's debut film Roja is released. Time magazine's film critic, Richard Corliss, said of the soundtrack in 2005 that the "astonishing debut work parades Rahman's gift for alchemizing outside influences until they are totally Tamil, totally Rahman," naming it one of the magazine's "10 Best Soundtracks" of all time.
- June 5 – The Sata Häme Accordion Festival takes place until June 14 in Ikaalinen, Finland.
- June 27
  - Michael Jackson starts the Dangerous World Tour, supporting his Dangerous album in Munich, Germany.
  - Guitarist Stefanie Sargent of punk rock band 7 Year Bitch dies of asphyxiation after returning home from a party in which she had drunk alcohol and taken a small amount of heroin. She was 24.
- June 29 – The Northern Accordion Festival takes place in Tornio-Haaparanta, Finland, until July 5.

=== July–August ===
- July 4
  - The BudaFest Summer Opera and Ballet Festival is launched in Budapest, Hungary.
  - Mark Heard suffers a heart attack while performing at the Cornerstone Festival in Illinois, USA. Heard goes to hospital immediately after finishing his set, but dies two weeks after being discharged in August.
- July 10 – Seinäjoki (Finland) Tango Festival begins, running to July 12.
- July 11 – "November Rain" by Guns N' Roses enters the world record books when it becomes the longest single, at 8 minutes, 57 seconds, to reach the US Top 20. The single's video has a budget of over US$1.5 million, becoming the most expensive at the time.
- July 12 – Opening of the Chamber-Music Festival of Kuhmo, Finland (until July 26).
- July 18 – Whitney Houston marries Bobby Brown.
- July 28 – Ice-T announces that the controversial track "Cop Killer" is being pulled from Body Count's self-titled album.
- August 2
  - Rozalla becomes the first artist from Zimbabwe to chart on the US Billboard magazine chart.
  - Former Beatle George Harrison tells Billboard magazine that he recently discovered that he was born on February 24, and not February 25 as he had thought for most of his life.
  - Haitian military authorities ban the playing of RAM's single "Fèy"; first performed at the Port-au-Prince Carnival in February, the song was interpreted as an anthem of support for exiled President Jean-Bertrand Aristide.
  - American pop-punk band Blink-182 form in the suburbs of San Diego, but are known as Blink until 1995.
- August 3 – Lahti Organ Festival (Finland) begins, lasting until August 9.
- August 5 – Drummer Jeff Porcaro dies aged 38 of a heart attack.
- August 8 – During the Guns N' Roses/Metallica Stadium Tour, Metallica frontman James Hetfield is burned by a pyrotechnics blast during a concert at Montreal's Olympic Stadium, forcing the group to cancel the second hour of the show. Co-headliners Guns N' Roses take the stage, but walk off early with Axl Rose complaining of throat problems. The abbreviated show causes angry fans to riot in the streets of Montreal. The tour resumed on August 25, but with a guitar technician replacing Hetfield on guitar for the remainder of the tour.
- August 14 – Opening of the Sibelius-Festival in Loviisa, Finland.
- August 18 – Frances Bean Cobain, daughter of Kurt Cobain and Courtney Love, is born.
- August 20 – Opening of the Helsinki Festival, with the theme: Music of the Baltics (orchestral and chamber-music concerts, opera productions, song recitals, ballet, theater, jazz, pop, and rock concerts) until September 6.
- August 22 - Six-year-old Qa'id Walker-Teal is shot dead by a stray bullet during a confrontation between rapper Tupac Shakur's entourage and a rival group at an outdoor festival in Marin City, California. Shakur is sued for wrongful death three years later.

=== September–October ===
- September 17 – Frank Zappa, in his final professional public appearance, conducts the Ensemble Modern at the Frankfurt Festival in Germany. Zappa, who is seriously ill with prostate cancer, receives a 20-minute ovation.
- October 3 – Sinéad O'Connor stirs up controversy when she rips up a picture of the Pope on the US television show, Saturday Night Live.
- October 16 – A Bob Dylan tribute concert is held at Madison Square Garden in New York. John Cougar Mellencamp, Neil Young, Eric Clapton, June Carter Cash, Johnny Cash and Tracy Chapman are among the performers, but much attention becomes focused on Sinéad O'Connor, who is loudly booed by much of the audience in response to the Saturday Night Live incident two weeks earlier.
- October 20 – Singer-songwriter Madonna releases her fifth studio album, Erotica, which became one of her most controversial albums to date due to overtly sexual content.
- October 31
  - "End of the Road" by Boyz II Men posts a 12th consecutive week at No. 1 in the US charts, ending a 36-year record previously held by Elvis Presley. Boyz II Men's record was broken on March 6, 1993, by Whitney Houston's "I Will Always Love You".
  - McTeague, an opera based on the Progressive Era-novel by Frank Norris, premieres at the Lyric Opera of Chicago.

=== November–December ===
- November 9 – Australian-born singer Kylie Minogue ends her working relationship with UK songwriters and record producers Stock Aitken Waterman and the record label PWL.
- November 15
  - Megan Jasper of Sub Pop creates the grunge speak hoax, tricking The New York Times into printing an article on supposed slang used in the grunge scene in Seattle, USA.
  - Ozzy Osbourne plays the final concert of his "retirement" tour at the Pacific Amphitheatre in Costa Mesa, California. He is joined on stage by his three former Black Sabbath bandmates for a reunion performance. Black Sabbath opened the show with Rob Halford as lead vocalist, filling in for Ronnie James Dio who had left the band days earlier.
  - The Jacksons: An American Dream, a two-part miniseries based on the Jackson family, premieres on ABC.
- November 17 – The soundtrack album of "The Bodyguard", Whitney Houston's debut film, is released. The album went on to be certified 18 times platinum by the RIAA and sell 45 million copies worldwide.
- November 22 – Manchester-based post-punk and electronic music label Factory Records declares bankruptcy. The label had been placed in financial difficulties following the spending of most of their funds by Happy Mondays during the recording of their album Yes Please!, which would end up a commercial failure. Additionally, plans for a buyout from London Records folded when it was discovered that none of Factory's artists were actually signed onto the label; most of these artists, most notably New Order, would end up signing onto London Records anyhow following Factory's foreclosure.
- December 5 – The 21st OTI Festival, held at the Teatro Principal in Valencia, Spain, is won by the song "A dónde voy sin ti", written by Chema Purón, and performed by Francisco representing Spain.
- December 31
  - Dietrich Fischer-Dieskau announces his retirement from the stage to an audience at the Bavarian State Opera in Munich.
  - The twenty-first annual New Year's Rockin' Eve special airs on ABC, with appearances by TLC, Bell Biv DeVoe, Slaughter, Jon Secada, Village People and Barry Manilow.

=== Also in 1992 ===
- David Isberg quits Opeth from his vocalist position. Current guitarist Mikael Åkerfeldt fills his position.
- Vibe, a new magazine focusing on R&B and hip-hop music, launches with a special Fall preview issue.
- The first Oregon Jamboree country music festival is held in Sweet Home, Oregon.
- The MP3 file format is developed as part of a video compression standard.

== Bands formed ==
- See Musical groups established in 1992

== Bands disbanded ==
- See Musical groups disestablished in 1992

== Bands reformed ==
- See Musical groups reestablished in 1992

== Albums released ==
=== January–March ===
Date		Album	Artist	Notes
J A N U A R Y	6	Little Earthquakes	Tori Amos	Debut/UK
J A N U A R Y	6	The Dirt Road	Sawyer Brown	-
J A N U A R Y	10	At the Ryman	Emmylou Harris	Live
J A N U A R Y	14	Born into the 90's	R. Kelly and Public Announcement	Debut
J A N U A R Y	14	Magic and Loss	Lou Reed	-
J A N U A R Y	14	Poetic Justice	Lillian Axe	-
J A N U A R Y	14	Rush	Eric Clapton	Soundtrack
J A N U A R Y	14	Stacy Earl	Stacy Earl	Debut
J A N U A R Y	21	The Acoustic Motorbike	Luka Bloom	-
J A N U A R Y	21	The American in Me	Steve Forbert	-
J A N U A R Y	24	Diva	My Sister's Machine	-
J A N U A R Y	27	Dixie-Narco	Primal Scream	EP
J A N U A R Y	27	High on the Happy Side	Wet Wet Wet	-
J A N U A R Y	27	Hormoaning	Nirvana	EP; Australia and Japan only
J A N U A R Y	27	Pleasure Death	Therapy?	EP
J A N U A R Y	27	Spooky	Lush	-
J A N U A R Y	28	Finally	CeCe Peniston	Debut
J A N U A R Y	28	The Great Puzzle	Jules Shear	-
J A N U A R Y	28	An Irish Evening	The Chieftains	Live
J A N U A R Y	31	Congregation	The Afghan Whigs	-
J A N U A R Y	?	Coincidence and Likely Stories	Buffy Sainte-Marie	-
J A N U A R Y	?	Rancid	Rancid	Debut/EP
F E B R U A R Y	2	B'z TV Style Songless version	B'z	Compilation
F E B R U A R Y	4	Mack Daddy	Sir Mix-a-Lot	-
F E B R U A R Y	4	Sap	Alice in Chains	EP
F E B R U A R Y	7	More Noise and Other Disturbances	The Mighty Mighty Bosstones	-
F E B R U A R Y	7	T.V. Sky	The Young Gods	-
F E B R U A R Y	10	Generation Terrorists	Manic Street Preachers	-
F E B R U A R Y	10	That What Is Not	Public Image Ltd	-
F E B R U A R Y	11	Black Eyed Man	Cowboy Junkies	-
F E B R U A R Y	11	Return of the Funky Man	Lord Finesse	-
F E B R U A R Y	11	Saturday Morning with Riders	Riders in the Sky	-
F E B R U A R Y	11	Shhh	Chumbawamba	-
F E B R U A R Y	11	Somewhere Between Heaven and Hell	Social Distortion	-
F E B R U A R Y	14	Propeller	Guided by Voices	-
F E B R U A R Y	17	Close to Seven	Sandra	-
F E B R U A R Y	17	Hormonally Yours	Shakespear's Sister	-
F E B R U A R Y	17	Romantic Moments	Yanni	Compilation
F E B R U A R Y	17	Seven	James	-
F E B R U A R Y	18	A Picture of Nectar	Phish	-
F E B R U A R Y	18	One	Me Phi Me	-
F E B R U A R Y	18	Stick Around for Joy	The Sugarcubes	-
F E B R U A R Y	18	Wayne's World	Various Artists	Soundtrack
F E B R U A R Y	21	I Am the Cosmos	Chris Bell	Recorded 1974-1975
F E B R U A R Y	24	Divine Madness	Madness	-
F E B R U A R Y	24	Get Ready!	2 Unlimited	-
F E B R U A R Y	25	The End of Silence	Rollins Band	-
F E B R U A R Y	25	F.U. Don't Take It Personal	Fu-Schnickens	-
F E B R U A R Y	25	Ooooooohhh... On the TLC Tip	TLC	Debut
F E B R U A R Y	25	Sex and Violence	Boogie Down Productions	-
F E B R U A R Y	25	Vulgar Display of Power	Pantera	US
F E B R U A R Y	26	A Blaze in the Northern Sky	Darkthrone	-
F E B R U A R Y	26	P-Model	P-Model	-
F E B R U A R Y	28	May I Sing with Me	Yo La Tengo	-
F E B R U A R Y	28	Onobox	Yoko Ono	Box Set
F E B R U A R Y	?	High Stakes & Dangerous Men	UFO	-
F E B R U A R Y	?	Love of Life	Swans	-
F E B R U A R Y	?	Money	KMFDM	-
F E B R U A R Y	?	Wonderama	Randy Stonehill	-
M A R C H	2	Tears Roll Down (Greatest Hits 82–92)	Tears for Fears	Compilation
M A R C H	3	Chic-Ism	Chic	-
M A R C H	3	Hypocrisy Is the Greatest Luxury	The Disposable Heroes of Hiphoprisy	-
M A R C H	3	Uh-Oh	David Byrne	-
M A R C H	3	Up	Right Said Fred	-
M A R C H	9	Gotthard	Gotthard	-
M A R C H	9	Doppelgänger	Curve	-
M A R C H	9	Going Blank Again	Ride	-
M A R C H	10	Baby I'm Yours	Maureen McGovern	Covers album
M A R C H	10	Dare to Dream	Yanni	-
M A R C H	10	Flipped Out in Singapore	Chainsaw Kittens	-
M A R C H	10	King's X	King's X	-
M A R C H	10	Let Me Come Over	Buffalo Tom	-
M A R C H	10	Opiate	Tool	EP, Debut EP
M A R C H	10	Priest=Aura	The Church	-
M A R C H	10	Walking in London	Concrete Blonde	-
M A R C H	10	Cracker	Cracker	Debut
M A R C H	13	Generator	Bad Religion	-
M A R C H	16	Eleven Kinds of Loneliness	Tanita Tikaram	-
M A R C H	16	Imperial f.f.r.r.	Unrest	-
M A R C H	17	Never Enough	Melissa Etheridge	-
M A R C H	17	360 Degrees of Power	Sister Souljah	-
M A R C H	17	Hey Babe	Juliana Hatfield	Debut
M A R C H	17	Ingénue	k.d. lang	-
M A R C H	17	La Sexorcisto: Devil Music, Vol. 1	White Zombie	-
M A R C H	17	No Doubt	No Doubt	-
M A R C H	23	Between 10th & 11th	The Charlatans	-
M A R C H	23	Code: Selfish	The Fall	-
M A R C H	23	Honey's Dead	The Jesus and Mary Chain	-
M A R C H	24	3 Years, 5 Months and 2 Days in the Life Of...	Arrested Development	Debut
M A R C H	24	Apollo 18	They Might Be Giants	-
M A R C H	24	Doin' the Nasty	Slik Toxik	-
M A R C H	24	Funky Divas	En Vogue	-
M A R C H	24	The Madman's Return	Snap!	-
M A R C H	27	Human Touch	Bruce Springsteen	-
M A R C H	27	Lucky Town	Bruce Springsteen	-
M A R C H	30	Celine Dion	Celine Dion	North America
M A R C H	30	Adrenalize	Def Leppard	-
M A R C H	30	Dry	PJ Harvey	Debut
M A R C H	30	Arkansas Traveler	Michelle Shocked	-
M A R C H	30	First Depression	Depressive Age	-
M A R C H	30	Lazer Guided Melodies	Spiritualized	-
M A R C H	31	America Must Be Destroyed	Gwar	-
M A R C H	31	Body Count	Body Count	Debut
M A R C H	31	Fire and Ice	Yngwie Malmsteen	-
M A R C H	31	Joshua Judges Ruth	Lyle Lovett	-
M A R C H	31	Racine	Sass Jordan	-
M A R C H	31	Time To Burn	Giant	-
M A R C H	31	Totally Krossed Out	Kriss Kross	Debut
M A R C H	31	Wynonna	Wynonna Judd	Solo debut
M A R C H	?	Last Rights	Skinny Puppy	-
M A R C H	?	Destination Universe	Material Issue	-
M A R C H	?	The Friday Rock Show Sessions	Hawkwind	Live
M A R C H	?	Hot Cars and Spent Contraceptives	Turbonegro	Debut

=== April–June ===
Date		Album	Artist	Notes
A P R I L	5	Accelerator	The Future Sound of London	Debut
A P R I L	6	Diva	Annie Lennox	Debut
A P R I L	6	Safari	The Breeders	EP
A P R I L	7	Anything Can Happen	Leon Russell	-
A P R I L	7	Dead Serious	Das EFX	-
A P R I L	7	Electric Love Hogs	Electric Love Hogs	Debut
A P R I L	7	The Singer	Diamanda Galás	-
A P R I L	7	Night on Earth	Tom Waits	Soundtrack to the 1991 film
A P R I L	13	Pure	Godflesh	-
A P R I L	13	Volume III Just Right	Soul II Soul	-
A P R I L	14	Arc Angels	Arc Angels	Debut
A P R I L	14	Bloodline	Recoil	-
A P R I L	14	Bricks Are Heavy	L7	-
A P R I L	14	Greatest Hits	ZZ Top	Greatest Hits
A P R I L	14	Holy Smoke	Peter Murphy	US
A P R I L	14	Off the Deep End	"Weird Al" Yankovic	-
A P R I L	14	Soul Rotation	The Dead Milkmen	-
A P R I L	14	This Is My Life	Carly Simon	-
A P R I L	14	The Woman I Am	Chaka Khan	-
A P R I L	17	Audio Adrenaline	Audio Adrenaline	-
A P R I L	20	Slanted and Enchanted	Pavement	-
A P R I L	21	Check Your Head	Beastie Boys	-
A P R I L	21	East Side Story	Kid Frost	-
A P R I L	21	The End Complete	Obituary	-
A P R I L	21	Hotwired	The Soup Dragons	-
A P R I L	21	Tongues and Tails	Sophie B. Hawkins	Debut
A P R I L	21	The Wild Life	Slaughter	-
A P R I L	21	Wish	The Cure	-
A P R I L	24	The Jon Spencer Blues Explosion	The Jon Spencer Blues Explosion	Debut
A P R I L	27	In the Running	Howard Jones	-
A P R I L	27	Nonsuch	XTC	-
A P R I L	28	Double Eclipse	Hardline	-
A P R I L	28	Matters of the Heart	Tracy Chapman	-
A P R I L	28	Tactical Neural Implant	Front Line Assembly	-
A P R I L	30	Night of the Stormrider	Iced Earth	US
A P R I L	?	I Was Warned	Robert Cray	-
A P R I L	?	Too Blind to See It	Kym Sims	-
A P R I L	?	No Room	The Samples	-
M A Y	1	The Longest Line	NOFX	EP
M A Y	1	The Way of the Vaselines: A Complete History	The Vaselines	Compilation
M A Y	5	Back to Front	Lionel Richie	Compilation
M A Y	5	Daily Operation	Gang Starr	-
M A Y	5	Drill	Radiohead	Debut EP
M A Y	5	Family Groove	The Neville Brothers	-
M A Y	5	Intoxifornication	Gregg Alexander	-
M A Y	5	Jon Secada	Jon Secada	-
M A Y	5	Milagro	Santana	-
M A Y	5	Onward to Golgotha	Incantation	Debut
M A Y	5	Scream in Blue	Midnight Oil	Live
M A Y	5	Under The Influence	Wildside	-
M A Y	6	Entre a Mi Mundo	Selena	-
M A Y	11	Fear of the Dark	Iron Maiden	-
M A Y	12	Henry's Dream	Nick Cave and the Bad Seeds	-
M A Y	12	The Origin of the Feces	Type O Negative	-
M A Y	12	The Ritual	Testament	-
M A Y	12	Rites of Passage	Indigo Girls	-
M A Y	12	The Southern Harmony and Musical Companion	The Black Crowes	-
M A Y	12	Spice 1	Spice 1	Debut
M A Y	18	Black Moon	Emerson, Lake & Palmer	-
M A Y	18	Forever Free	Saxon	-
M A Y	18	Love Is	Kim Wilde	-
M A Y	19	Boats, Beaches, Bars & Ballads	Jimmy Buffett	Box Set
M A Y	19	Life Is Messy	Rodney Crowell	-
M A Y	19	Revenge	Kiss	-
M A Y	19	Some Gave All	Billy Ray Cyrus	-
M A Y	19	Souls at Zero	Neurosis	-
M A Y	19	T-Ride	T-Ride	-
M A Y	21	Image	Luna Sea	-
M A Y	22	Time Takes Time	Ringo Starr	-
M A Y	25	The Brother with Two Tongues	Mellow Man Ace	-
M A Y	25	Realized Fantasies	TNT	Japanese release date
M A Y	26	Ocean Colour Scene	Ocean Colour Scene	Debut
M A Y	26	Dark Sneak Love Action	Tom Tom Club	-
M A Y	26	Kiko	Los Lobos	-
M A Y	26	Peng!	Stereolab	Debut
M A Y	?	Hawklords Live	Hawklords	Live
M A Y	?	Novelty	Jawbox	-
M A Y	?	Two from the Vault	Grateful Dead	Live
M A Y	?	Sacrilegium	Devil Doll	-
M A Y	?	Everything	Mr. Children	EP
J U N E	1			
J U N E	1	40oz. to Freedom	Sublime	Debut
J U N E	1	Abba-esque	Erasure	ABBA covers EP
J U N E	1	Change Everything	Del Amitri	-
J U N E	1	The World as Best as I Remember It, Volume Two	Rich Mullins	-
J U N E	2	Acoustic	Everything but the Girl	-
J U N E	2	It's a Shame about Ray	The Lemonheads	-
J U N E	2	The Lizard	Saigon Kick	-
J U N E	2	MTV Unplugged	Mariah Carey	Live EP
J U N E	2	Shadows and Light	Wilson Phillips	-
J U N E	8	Angel Dust	Faith No More	-
J U N E	8	The Crimson Idol	W.A.S.P.	-
J U N E	8	Aqua	Asia	-
J U N E	9	An Evening with the Allman Brothers Band: First Set	Allman Brothers Band	Live
J U N E	9	Ferment	Catherine Wheel	-
J U N E	9	Legion	Deicide	-
J U N E	9	Mecca and the Soul Brother	Pete Rock & CL Smooth	-
J U N E	10	Loudness	Loudness	-
J U N E	12	Goin' Back to New Orleans	Dr. John	-
J U N E	16	Beat the Boots II	Frank Zappa	Live Box Set
J U N E	16	Hold Your Fire	FireHouse	-
J U N E	16	Khaled	Khaled	-
J U N E	16	Out of the Cradle	Lindsey Buckingham	-
J U N E	16	World Falling Down	Peter Cetera	-
J U N E	19	The Great Adventure	Steven Curtis Chapman	-
J U N E	19	Imperfectly	Ani DiFranco	-
J U N E	22	Dehumanizer	Black Sabbath	UK
J U N E	22	The One	Elton John	-
J U N E	23	Don't Sweat the Technique	Eric B. & Rakim	-
J U N E	23	Black Pearl	Yo-Yo	-
J U N E	23	Get in Touch with Yourself	Swing Out Sister	UK
J U N E	23	Good Stuff	The B-52's	-
J U N E	23	Infinity Within	Deee-Lite	-
J U N E	23	The King of Rock 'n' Roll: The Complete 50s Masters	Elvis Presley	Box Set
J U N E	23	Meantime	Helmet	-
J U N E	23	Mo' Money	Various Artists	Soundtrack
J U N E	23	Tools of the Trade	Carcass	-
J U N E	23	Utopia Banished	Napalm Death	US
J U N E	29	F.N.G.	Suicidal Tendencies	Compilation
J U N E	29	Somewhere Far Beyond	Blind Guardian	-
J U N E	30	The Art of Rebellion	Suicidal Tendencies	-
J U N E	30	Blues for the Red Sun	Kyuss	-
J U N E	30	Come On Come On	Mary Chapin Carpenter	-
J U N E	30	Kizz My Black Azz	MC Ren	EP, Debut
J U N E	30	Retribution	Malevolent Creation	-
J U N E	30	Singles: Original Motion Picture Soundtrack	Various Artists	Soundtrack
J U N E	30	Soft Bomb	The Chills	-

=== July–September ===
Date		Album	Artist	Notes
J U L Y	6	U.F.Orb	The Orb	-
J U L Y	7	Carry On	Kansas	Compilation
J U L Y	7	Images and Words	Dream Theater	-
J U L Y	7	Strength in Numbers	24-7 Spyz	-
J U L Y	7	This One's Gonna Hurt You	Marty Stuart	-
J U L Y	10	You Can't Do That on Stage Anymore, Vol. 5	Frank Zappa	2 discs; Live
J U L Y	13	Live in Japan	George Harrison	Live
J U L Y	14	Countdown to Extinction	Megadeth	-
J U L Y	14	The Criminal Under My Own Hat	T Bone Burnett	-
J U L Y	14	Danzig III: How the Gods Kill	Danzig	-
J U L Y	14	Everybody's Free	Rozalla	-
J U L Y	14	The Hard Way	Clint Black	-
J U L Y	14	Psalm 69: The Way to Succeed and the Way to Suck Eggs	Ministry	-
J U L Y	14	Shorty the Pimp	Too Short	-
J U L Y	14	Shades of God	Paradise Lost	-
J U L Y	20	Burning Questions	Graham Parker	-
J U L Y	20	Turns into Stone	The Stone Roses	Compilation
J U L Y	21	Dirty	Sonic Youth	-
J U L Y	21	House of Pain	House of Pain	Debut
J U L Y	27	Astronauts & Heretics	Thomas Dolby	-
J U L Y	27	March ör Die	Motörhead	-
J U L Y	27	Moby	Moby	Debut
J U L Y	27	Now That's What I Call Music! 22	Various Artists	Compilation
J U L Y	27	Peppermint	Sloan	EP
J U L Y	27	The Red in the Sky Is Ours	At the Gates	Debut
J U L Y	27	Your Arsenal	Morrissey	-
J U L Y	28	Blood and Bullets	Widowmaker	-
J U L Y	28	Business Never Personal	EPMD	-
J U L Y	28	Gordon	Barenaked Ladies	-
J U L Y	28	What's the 411?	Mary J. Blige	Debut
J U L Y	?	California Brainstorm	Hawkwind	Live
J U L Y	?	Submarine	Whipping Boy	Debut
J U L Y	?	Worth the Weight	Anvil	-
A U G U S T	3	Machine + Soul	Gary Numan	-
A U G U S T	3	March 16–20, 1992	Uncle Tupelo	-
A U G U S T	3	Summer in Paradise	The Beach Boys	-
A U G U S T	3	Welcome to Wherever You Are	INXS	-
A U G U S T	4	Lost Together	Blue Rodeo	-
A U G U S T	4	New Miserable Experience	Gin Blossoms	-
A U G U S T	4	Troubadour: The Definitive Collection 1964-1976	Donovan	Box Set
A U G U S T	11	Don't Tread	Damn Yankees	-
A U G U S T	11	Fontanelle	Babes in Toyland	
A U G U S T	11	Hit to Death in the Future Head	The Flaming Lips	-
A U G U S T	11	Jackyl	Jackyl	-
A U G U S T	17	Take That & Party	Take That	-
A U G U S T	18	Babe Rainbow	The House of Love	-
A U G U S T	18	Lunapark	Luna	-
A U G U S T	18	Mind Fruit	Opus III	-
A U G U S T	18	Refugee	Bad4Good	-
A U G U S T	18	T-R-O-U-B-L-E	Travis Tritt	-
A U G U S T	24	Greatest Hits	Kylie Minogue	Compilation
A U G U S T	25	Unplugged	Eric Clapton	Live
A U G U S T	25	Beyond the Season	Garth Brooks	Christmas album
A U G U S T	25	Bobby	Bobby Brown	-
A U G U S T	25	Dog Eat Dog	Warrant	-
A U G U S T	25	Return of the Product	MC Serch	-
A U G U S T	25	Soul of a New Machine	Fear Factory	Debut
A U G U S T	25	Start the Car	Jude Cole	-
A U G U S T	25	Sweet Old World	Lucinda Williams	-
A U G U S T	25	The Wallflowers	The Wallflowers	-
A U G U S T	28	Scrolls of the Megilloth	Mortification	-
A U G U S T	28	Tourism	Roxette	-
A U G U S T	31	Tubular Bells II	Mike Oldfield	-
A U G U S T	?	Blue Moons & Laughing Guitars	Bill Nelson	Demo
A U G U S T	?	Just Got Back Today	The Jennifers	-
A U G U S T	?	Powderfinger	Powderfinger	EP
A U G U S T	?	Tapping the Vein	Sodom	-
S E P T E M B E R	1	Change Your World	Michael W. Smith	-
S E P T E M B E R	1	Down on Sunset	Thomas Anders	-
S E P T E M B E R	1	I Gotta Get Mine Yo	Chubb Rock	-
S E P T E M B E R	1	I Still Believe in You	Vince Gill	-
S E P T E M B E R	1	Hearts in Armor	Trisha Yearwood	-
S E P T E M B E R	1	Mondo Bizarro	Ramones	-
S E P T E M B E R	1	Nerve Net	Brian Eno	-
S E P T E M B E R	1	Paul Weller	Paul Weller	Debut
S E P T E M B E R	2	Hold Me	Zard	-
S E P T E M B E R	4	Copper Blue	Sugar	Debut
S E P T E M B E R	7	Amused to Death	Roger Waters	-
S E P T E M B E R	7	Kingdom of Desire	Toto	-
S E P T E M B E R	7	Stranglers in the Night	The Stranglers	-
S E P T E M B E R	7	The Looks or the Lifestyle?	Pop Will Eat Itself	-
S E P T E M B E R	8	Puzzle	Dada	Debut
S E P T E M B E R	8	99.9F°	Suzanne Vega	-
S E P T E M B E R	8	America's Least Wanted	Ugly Kid Joe	Debut
S E P T E M B E R	8	Bone Machine	Tom Waits	-
S E P T E M B E R	8	Good	Morphine	-
S E P T E M B E R	8	Slide on This	Ronnie Wood	-
S E P T E M B E R	8	Sweet Oblivion	Screaming Trees	-
S E P T E M B E R	14	Am I Not Your Girl?	Sinéad O'Connor	Covers
S E P T E M B E R	14	The Chase	Garth Brooks	-
S E P T E M B E R	14	Down Colorful Hill	Red House Painters	-
S E P T E M B E R	14	A Little Light Music	Jethro Tull	Live
S E P T E M B E R	15	The Best of White Lion	White Lion	Compilation
S E P T E M B E R	15	Comfort	Failure	Debut
S E P T E M B E R	15	Dos	Gerardo	-
S E P T E M B E R	15	Greatest Misses	Public Enemy	Remixes
S E P T E M B E R	15	Hollywood Town Hall	The Jayhawks	-
S E P T E M B E R	15	Pure Country	George Strait	-
S E P T E M B E R	15	You Gotta Believe	Marky Mark and the Funky Bunch	-
S E P T E M B E R	21	ABBA Gold: Greatest Hits	ABBA	Compilation
S E P T E M B E R	21	Sweet Pizzicato Five	Pizzicato Five	-
S E P T E M B E R	22	B-Side Ourselves	Skid Row	Covers EP
S E P T E M B E R	22	Blind Melon	Blind Melon	-
S E P T E M B E R	22	Broken	Nine Inch Nails	EP
S E P T E M B E R	22	Guerillas in tha Mist	Da Lench Mob	Debut
S E P T E M B E R	22	Here Comes Trouble	Bad Company	-
S E P T E M B E R	22	On Our Worst Behavior	Immature	-
S E P T E M B E R	22	Runaway Slave	Showbiz & AG	-
S E P T E M B E R	22	Stunts, Blunts and Hip Hop	Diamond D	Debut
S E P T E M B E R	22	III Sides to Every Story	Extreme	-
S E P T E M B E R	22	Tomb of the Mutilated	Cannibal Corpse	-
S E P T E M B E R	22	Whut? Thee Album	Redman	Debut
S E P T E M B E R	22	Yes Please!	Happy Mondays	-
S E P T E M B E R	25	Ignition	The Offspring	-
S E P T E M B E R	28	Us	Peter Gabriel	-
S E P T E M B E R	28	Back to the Light	Brian May	UK
S E P T E M B E R	28	Experience	The Prodigy	Released in US October 20
S E P T E M B E R	29	Chipmunks in Low Places	Alvin and the Chipmunks	-
S E P T E M B E R	29	Core	Stone Temple Pilots	Debut
S E P T E M B E R	29	Dirt	Alice in Chains	-
S E P T E M B E R	29	Junkanoo	Baha Men	-
S E P T E M B E R	29	Music to Driveby	Compton's Most Wanted	-
S E P T E M B E R	29	Not Ashamed	Newsboys	-
S E P T E M B E R	29	Not Ashamed	Newsboys	-
S E P T E M B E R	29	Oomalama	Eugenius	Debut
S E P T E M B E R	29	The Triumph of Steel	Manowar	Europe

=== October–December ===
Date		Album	Artist	Notes
O C T O B E R	1	Duh	Lagwagon	Debut
O C T O B E R	1	Dynamo	Soda Stereo	-
O C T O B E R	1	Fully Completely	The Tragically Hip	Canada
O C T O B E R	5	Angel Heart	Bonnie Tyler	-
O C T O B E R	5	Connected	Stereo MC's	-
O C T O B E R	5	Penetralia	Hypocrisy	Debut
O C T O B E R	5	Pigpile	Big Black	Live album
O C T O B E R	5	Revenge of the Goldfish	Inspiral Carpets	-
O C T O B E R	5	Twice Upon a Time: The Singles	Siouxsie and the Banshees	Compilation
O C T O B E R	6	A Lot About Livin' (And a Little 'bout Love)	Alan Jackson	-
O C T O B E R	6	Automatic for the People	R.E.M.	-
O C T O B E R	6	Blind	The Sundays	US
O C T O B E R	6	Can I Borrow a Dollar?	Common	Debut
O C T O B E R	6	Can't Run from Yourself	Tanya Tucker	-
O C T O B E R	6	Eleventeen	Daisy Chainsaw	Debut
O C T O B E R	6	Grave Dancers Union	Soul Asylum	-
O C T O B E R	6	Home for Christmas	Amy Grant	Christmas
O C T O B E R	6	Just Look Around	Sick of It All	-
O C T O B E R	6	Our Time In Eden	10,000 Maniacs	-
O C T O B E R	6	Play Me Backwards	Joan Baez	-
O C T O B E R	6	Push	Gruntruck	-
O C T O B E R	7	Infamous Angel	Iris Dement	Debut
O C T O B E R	10	Liar	The Jesus Lizard	-
O C T O B E R	10	Stull	Urge Overkill	EP
O C T O B E R	12			
O C T O B E R	12	Once in a Lifetime – The Best of Talking Heads	Talking Heads	Compilation
O C T O B E R	13	Bigger, Better, Faster, More!	4 Non Blondes	Debut
O C T O B E R	13	Life's a Dance	John Michael Montgomery	-
O C T O B E R	13	Love Symbol Album	Prince	-
O C T O B E R	13	Izzy Stradlin and the Ju Ju Hounds	Izzy Stradlin and the Ju Ju Hounds	-
O C T O B E R	13	Piece of Cake	Mudhoney	-
O C T O B E R	13	Salutations from the Ghetto Nation	Warrior Soul	-
O C T O B E R	16	Stamina Daddy	Buju Banton	Debut
O C T O B E R	19	Jehovahkill	Julian Cope	UK; released in US Dec. 8
O C T O B E R	19	Main Offender	Keith Richards	-
O C T O B E R	20	Erotica	Madonna	-
O C T O B E R	20	Breathless	Kenny G	-
O C T O B E R	20	High in High School	Chainsaw Kittens	-
O C T O B E R	20	King of Hearts	Roy Orbison	-
O C T O B E R	20	Reel to Reel	Grand Puba	Debut
O C T O B E R	20	A Very Special Christmas 2	Various Artists	Christmas
O C T O B E R	23	Don't Miss the Train	No Use for a Name	-
O C T O B E R	23	You Can't Do That on Stage Anymore, Vol. 6	Frank Zappa	2 discs; Live
O C T O B E R	26	Live	AC/DC	Live
O C T O B E R	26	Love Deluxe	Sade	UK
O C T O B E R	26	Homebrew	Neneh Cherry	-
O C T O B E R	27	It's About Time	SWV	Debut
O C T O B E R	27	It's-It	The Sugarcubes	Remix Album
O C T O B E R	27	Playground Psychotics	Frank Zappa and The Mothers of Invention	-
O C T O B E R	28	Run	B'z	-
O C T O B E R	30	Greatest Hits	Gloria Estefan	Compilation
O C T O B E R	30	Smeared	Sloan	Canada
O C T O B E R	?	Carnival of Carnage	Insane Clown Posse	Debut
N O V E M B E R	1	Free at Last	dc Talk	-
N O V E M B E R	1	The Karelian Isthmus	Amorphis	Debut
N O V E M B E R	2	Shine On	Pink Floyd	Box Set
N O V E M B E R	2	Harvest Moon	Neil Young	-
N O V E M B E R	2	Happy Nation	Ace of Base	-
N O V E M B E R	2	God's Great Banana Skin	Chris Rea	UK
N O V E M B E R	2	Madstock!	Madness	Live
N O V E M B E R	2	Nurse	Therapy?	-
N O V E M B E R	2	Palomine	Bettie Serveert	Debut
N O V E M B E R	3	Are You Normal?	Ned's Atomic Dustbin	-
N O V E M B E R	3	Good as I Been to You	Bob Dylan	-
N O V E M B E R	3	Keep the Faith	Bon Jovi	-
N O V E M B E R	3	The Skills Dat Pay Da Bills	Positive K	-
N O V E M B E R	3	Uncut Dope: Geto Boys' Best	Geto Boys	Compilation
N O V E M B E R	5	White Trash, Two Heebs and a Bean	NOFX	-
N O V E M B E R	6	Rage Against the Machine	Rage Against the Machine	Debut
N O V E M B E R	10	Aladdin: Original Motion Picture Soundtrack	Various Artists	Soundtrack
N O V E M B E R	10	The Complete Collection and Then Some...	Barry Manilow	Compilation
N O V E M B E R	10	Federal	E-40	-
N O V E M B E R	10	Pure Guava	Ween	-
N O V E M B E R	10	Urban Discipline	Biohazard	-
N O V E M B E R	11	Back in Denim	Denim	-
N O V E M B E R	16	The Way We Walk, Volume One: The Shorts	Genesis	Live
N O V E M B E R	16	The Great Deceiver	King Crimson	Live Box Set rec. 1973–'74
N O V E M B E R	16	Pop! – the First 20 Hits	Erasure	Compilation
N O V E M B E R	16	Now That's What I Call Music! 23	Various Artists	Compilation
N O V E M B E R	17	The Bodyguard: Original Soundtrack Album	Whitney Houston	Soundtrack
N O V E M B E R	17	The Chipmunks: Greatest Hits	The Chipmunks	Compilation
N O V E M B E R	17	Jade to the Max	Jade	Debut
N O V E M B E R	17	The Predator	Ice Cube	-
N O V E M B E R	17	Pubic Fruit	Curve	Compilation
N O V E M B E R	19	I've Suffered a Head Injury	The Verve Pipe	EP
N O V E M B E R	23	25 Years – The Chain	Fleetwood Mac	Box Set
N O V E M B E R	24	Bizarre Ride II the Pharcyde	The Pharcyde	Debut
N O V E M B E R	24	The Future	Leonard Cohen	-
N O V E M B E R	24	Homebelly Groove...Live	Spin Doctors	Live
N O V E M B E R	24	Live and Let Die	Kool G Rap	-
N O V E M B E R	24	Something Real	Stephanie Mills	-
N O V E M B E R	?	Barely Real	Codeine	-
N O V E M B E R	?	Circa: Now!	Rocket from the Crypt	-
N O V E M B E R	?	Holy Mountain	Sleep	UK
D E C E M B E R	1	11:11	Come	Debut
D E C E M B E R	1	Time^{3}	Journey	Compilation
D E C E M B E R	7	Fixed	Nine Inch Nails	Remix EP
D E C E M B E R	7	Love God	Milk Cult	-
D E C E M B E R	7	The Verve E.P.	The Verve	EP
D E C E M B E R	8	Utah Saints	Utah Saints	Debut
D E C E M B E R	8	Tostaky	Noir Désir	-
D E C E M B E R	9	Friends	B'z	EP
D E C E M B E R	10	5150: Home 4 tha Sick	Eazy-E	EP
D E C E M B E R	11	The Shape of Grace	Out of the Grey	-
D E C E M B E R	14	Incesticide	Nirvana	Rarities and unreleased material
D E C E M B E R	14	It's Your Call	Reba McEntire	-
D E C E M B E R	15	Happy Hour	King Missile	-
D E C E M B E R	15	The Chronic	Dr. Dre	Solo Debut
D E C E M B E R	17	Back from Hell	Disco Rick and the Wolf Pack	-
D E C E M B E R	21	Three Nights in Tokyo	TNT	Live
D E C E M B E R	22	...If I Ever Fall in Love	Shai	Debut
D E C E M B E R	29	Changes	Christopher Williams	-
D E C E M B E R	?	Alejandro Fernández	Alejandro Fernández	Debut

=== Release date unknown ===
- Adam 'n' Eve – Gavin Friday
- Alice in Wonderland No. 4 – Randy Greif
- The Basics of Life – 4Him
- Big Bang – Magdallan
- Black Ticket Day – Ed Kuepper
- Brer Rabbit and Boss Lion – Dr. John
- Camera Camera – Nazia and Zoheb
- Center Of The Universe – Giant Sand
- Code Red – Cindy Blackman
- Condition Blue – The Jazz Butcher
- Crooked Line – Nils Lofgren
- Destination Paradise – Fischer-Z
- Don Dada – Super Cat
- Fireboy – Grant McLennan
- Goin' Back to Dixie – John Hartford
- Groovus Maximus – Electric Boys
- I, Jonathan – Jonathan Richman
- I'll Find You There – The Kry
- In Search of Manny – Luscious Jackson
- Irène Schweizer & Pierre Favre – Irène Schweizer and Pierre Favre
- Last Train – Holy Soldier
- Le Jardin de Heavenly – Heavenly
- Letters To A Dream – Louis Tillett
- Little Village – Little Village
- Lusis – Mortal
- Lysol – Melvins
- Mercy – Bryan Duncan
- My Friend Louis – Andrew Cyrille
- Not Fade Away – Nitty Gritty Dirt Band
- Notes from the Underground – Medeski Martin & Wood
- Pick It Up – Hokus Pick Manouver
- Pray for Rain – PFR
- Pray Naked – The 77s
- Remember – Crystal Lewis
- Scenic Routes – Lost Dogs
- Short Man's Room – Joe Henry
- Six-Pack of Love – Peter Case
- Snakes in the Playground - Bride
- Tales of Wonder - White Heart
- Through the Forest – Mad at the World
- Too Much Fun - Green On Red
- True Believer – Irma Thomas
- Valhalla Avenue – The Fatima Mansions
- XX Years Live – Rez Band
- Saddle Up – First Arsch

== Biggest hit singles ==
The following songs achieved the highest chart positions in the charts of 1992.

#	Artist	Title	Year	Country	Chart Entries
1	Whitney Houston	I Will Always Love You	1992	(United States)	UK 1 – Nov 1992, US BB 1 of 1992, Holland 1 – Nov 1992, Sweden 1 – Nov 1992, Switzerland 1 – Dec 1992, Norway 1 – Dec 1992, Poland 1 – Nov 1992, Germany 1 – Jan 1993, Republic of Ireland 1 – Dec 1992, Australia 1 for 10 weeks Mar 1993, Grammy in 1993, Austria 2 – Dec 1992, Australia 2 of 1993, US CashBox 5 of 1993, Japan 5 of all time (international songs), Italy 7 of 1992, Global 7 (10 M sold) – 1992, POP 10 of 1992, Europe 19 of the 1990s, TOTP 19, AFI 65, Germany 67 of the 1990s, Scrobulate 90 of ballad, RIAA 108, RYM 172 of 1992, Party 280 of 1999, Acclaimed 802
2	Nirvana	Smells Like Teen Spirit	1991	(United States)	New Zealand 1 for 1 weeks Feb 1992, Sweden 2 – Jan 1992, Norway 2 – Jan 1992, Poland 2 – Jan 1992, Germany 2 – Jan 1992, Holland 3 – Nov 1991, RYM 3 of 1991, Acclaimed 3, US BB 5 of 1992, Scrobulate 5 of rock, US BB 6 of 1992, Switzerland 6 – Feb 1992, Europe 6 of the 1990s, POP 6 of 1992, UK 7 – Nov 1991, Belgium 7 of all time, 7 in 2FM list, Rolling Stone 9, France 10 – Dec 1991, Austria 11 – Feb 1992, Virgin 16, Poland 23 of all time, US CashBox 27 of 1992, Italy 29 of 1992, Global 33 (5 M sold) – 1991, WXPN 53, RIAA 80, Germany 152 of the 1990s, TheQ 321, OzNet 900
3	Boyz II Men	End of the Road	1992	(United States)	UK 1 – Sep 1992, US BB 1 of 1992, US CashBox 1 of 1992, Holland 1 – Oct 1992, Republic of Ireland 1 – Nov 1992, New Zealand 1 for 7 weeks Oct 1992, Australia 1 for 4 weeks Feb 1993, US BB 3 of 1992, Sweden 3 – Oct 1992, Norway 3 – Nov 1992, POP 3 of 1992, Poland 6 – Sep 1992, Switzerland 7 – Oct 1992, Germany 7 – Jan 1993, Australia 21 of 1992, Austria 29 – Nov 1992, Scrobulate 89 of rnb, Germany 337 of the 1990s
4	Snap!	Rhythm is a Dancer	1992	(Germany)	UK 1 – Jul 1992, Holland 1 – Apr 1992, Austria 1 – May 1992, Switzerland 1 – Apr 1992, Italy 1 of 1992, Germany 1 – Apr 1992, Republic of Ireland 1 – Aug 1992, France 3 – Apr 1992, Sweden 4 – May 1992, Norway 4 – Jun 1992, US BB 5 of 1993, Germany 6 of the 1990s, US CashBox 12 of 1993, Australia 12 of 1992, US BB 17 of 1992, POP 17 of 1993, Scrobulate 65 of 90s, RYM 96 of 1992
5	Mr. Big	To Be With You	1991	(United States)	US BB 1 of 1992, Holland 1 – Mar 1992, Sweden 1 – Feb 1992, Switzerland 1 – Mar 1992, Norway 1 – Mar 1992, Germany 1 – Mar 1992, New Zealand 1 for 5 weeks Mar 1992, Australia 1 for 3 weeks Aug 1992, Austria 2 – Apr 1992, UK 3 – Mar 1992, Poland 5 – Jan 1992, Australia 7 of 1992, US CashBox 9 of 1992, POP 25 of 1992, Germany 47 of the 1990s, OzNet 386

== Top 40 Chart hit singles ==
Song title	Artist(s)	Release date(s)	US	UK	Highest chart position	Other Chart Performance(s)
"Achy Breaky Heart"	Billy Ray Cyrus	November 1992	4	3	1 (Australia, New Zealand)	See chart performance entry
"Ain't No Doubt"	Jimmy Nail	June 1992	n/a	1	1 (Ireland, United Kingdom)	See chart performance entry
"All That She Wants"	Ace of Base	August 1992	2	1	1 (12 countries)	See chart performance entry
"Amigos Para Siempre"	José Carreras & Sarah Brightman	June 1992	n/a	11	1 (Australia)	3 (Portugal) - 7 (Netherlands Single Top 100) - 10 (Netherlands Dutch Top 40) - 10 (Norway) - 16 (Ireland) - 33 (Europe) - 36 (Sweden) - 44 (Belgium)
"Are You Ready to Fly"	Rozalla	February 1992	63	17	4 (Spain)	See chart performance entry

=== Other Chart hit singles ===
- "A Deeper Love" - Clivillés & Cole
- "America: What Time Is Love?" - The KLF
- "Atesle Barut" – Sertab Erener
- "Baby-Baby-Baby" – TLC (#2 US)
- "Baby Got Back" – Sir Mix-a-Lot (#1 US, #8 AUS)
- "Baker Street" – Undercover (#2 UK, IRL, BE, SWI, #3 AUT, NLD)
- "Barcelona" – Freddie Mercury (#2 UK, NLD, NZ, #3 IRL)
- "Be My Baby" – Vanessa Paradis (#2 BE, #5 FR, #6 UK, IRL)
- "Be Quick or Be Dead" – Iron Maiden (#2 UK, #3 NOR)
- "Because the Night" – Co.Ro & Tarlisa (#1 IT, SP, #6 FR, #8 BE)
- "The Best Things in Life Are Free" – Luther Vandross & Janet Jackson (#2 AUS, UK, #6 IRL, NZ)
- "Boss Drum" – The Shamen
- "Breakin' My Heart (Pretty Brown Eyes)" – Mint Condition (#6 US)
- "Breath of Life" – Erasure (#7 FIN, #8 IRL, UK)
- "Ça ne change pas un homme" – Johnny Hallyday (#7 FR)
- "Caroline" – MC Solaar (#4 FR)
- "Cash City" – Luc de Larochellière (#1 QUE, #11 FR)
- "Come and Talk to Me" – Jodeci
- "Come as You Are" – Nirvana (#3 NZ, #7 IRL, #9 UK)
- "Como la Flor" – Selena (#6 US Latin)
- "Connected" – Stereo MCs (#5 AUT, #6 SWI, #8 SWE)
- "Could It Be Magic" – Take That (#3 UK, IRL, #8 BE)
- "Damn I Wish I Was Your Lover" – Sophie B. Hawkins (#3 NOR, #5 US, #7 AUS)
- "Das Boot" – U 96 (#1 AUT, GER, NOR, #4 NLD, #5 SWE)
- "Diamonds and Pearls" – Prince (#3 US)
- "Deeply Dippy" – Right Said Fred (#1 UK, IRL, #6 AUT)
- "Didi" – Khaled (#9 FR, #10 BE)
- "Die da!?" – Die Fantastischen Vier (#1 AUT, SWI, #2 GER)
- "Disappointed" - Electronic
- "Do I Have to Say the Words?" – Bryan Adams (#2 CAN)
- "Do It to Me" - Lionel Richie
- "Don't Be Aggressive" – Sandra (#7 NOR, #8 FIN)
- "Don't Let the Sun Go Down on Me" – Elton John & George Michael (#1 FR, NLD, NOR, US)
- "Don't Talk Just Kiss" – Right Said Fred (#2 GER, #3 UK, #4 FIN, SWE)
- "Don't You Want Me" – Felix (#1 FIN, IT, SP, SWI)
- "Drive" – R.E.M. (#4 IRL, #7 CAN)
- "Driven by You" – Brian May (#6 UK, #9 US)
- "Dur dur d'être bébé !" – Jordy (#1 FR, SP, #2 FIN, #3 AUT, BE, NLD)
- "Ebeneezer Goode" – The Shamen (#1 UK, IRL, #2 NOR, #8 FIN)
- "El Visa" – Cheb Hasni (ALG)
- "End of the Road" – Boyz II Men
- "Erotica" – Madonna (#1 ITA, #2 NOR, #3 US, UK, SWE, NZ, #4 AUS, IRE, SPA, #8 SWI)
- "Even Better Than the Real Thing" – U2 (#3 CAN, IRL, #8 AUT, NLD)
- "Everything About You" – Ugly Kid Joe (#3 UK, #5 IRL, NLD, NOR, #9 US)
- "Everytime We Touch" – Maggie Reilly (#1 NOR, #5 AUT)
- "Free Your Mind" – En Vogue (#8 US)
- "Friday I'm In Love" – The Cure (#3 CAN, #4 IRL, #6 UK)
- "Give It Up" – The Good Men
- "Giving Him Something He Can Feel" - En Vogue
- "God Gave Rock 'n' Roll to You II" - Kiss
- "Goodnight Girl" – Wet Wet Wet (#1 UK, IRL)
- "Hazard" – Richard Marx (#1 AUS, #3 CAN, #6 SWE)
- "Heading for a Fall" – Vaya Con Dios (#1 BE, #3 NLD, #5 SWI)
- "Heal the World" – Michael Jackson (#1 POL, #2 FR, IRL, UK, ZIM)
- "Heaven Sent" – INXS
- "High" – The Cure (#8 UK)
- "Hold on My Heart" – Genesis (#1 CAN)
- "House of Love" – East 17 (#1 FIN, SWE, #3 JAP, #6 GER)
- "How Do You Do!" – Roxette (#1 NOR, #2 AUT, NLD, GER, SWE, SWI)
- "How Do You Talk to an Angel" – The Heights (#1 US, #2 CAN, #3 AUS)
- "Human Touch" – Bruce Springsteen (#1 NOR, SP, #4 FIN, IRL, SWE, SWI)
- "Humpin' Around" – Bobby Brown (#1 AUS, #2 NZ, #3 US)
- "I Can't Dance" – Genesis (#1 BE, NLD, #2 AUT, #3 CAN)
- "I Don't Care" - Shakespears Sister
- "I Drove All Night" – Roy Orbison (#7 UK)
- "I Still Believe in You" – Cliff Richard (#7 UK)
- "I Wanna Be a Kennedy" – U96 (#3 SWI, #4 GER, #6 AUT)
- "I Will Always Love You" – Whitney Houston
- "I'd Die Without You" - P.M. Dawn
- "If I Ever Fall in Love" – Shai (#4 AUS, #5 NZ)
- "If You Asked Me To" – Celine Dion (#1 CAN)
- "If You Go Away" – New Kids on the Block (#4 NOR, #6 CAN, #9 UK)
- "I'll Be There" – Mariah Carey (#1 US, CAN, NLD)
- "I'm Doing Fine Now" - The Pasadenas
- "I'm Too Sexy" – Right Said Fred (#1 US)
- "In Bloom" – Nirvana (#7 IRL)
- "In the Closet" – Michael Jackson (#2 IT, SP, #4 IRL, #5 AUS, NZ, #6 US)
- "In the Still of the Nite (I'll Remember)" - Boyz II Men
- "Iron Lion Zion" – Bob Marley (#2 NZ, SWE, #3 FR, #5 BE, UK)
- "It Only Takes a Minute" – Take That (#7 UK)
- "It Will Make Me Crazy" – Felix (#1 FIN, #3 SWI, #4 IRL)
- "It's a Fine Day" – Opus III (#2 SP, #5 UK, #6 IRL)
- "It's My Life" – Dr Alban (#1 AUT, BE, GER, IT, NLD, SWE)
- "It's Probably Me" – Sting & Eric Clapton (#1 IT, #2 FR)
- "Jam" – Michael Jackson (#1 SP, #2 NZ, #5 IRL)
- "James Brown Is Dead" – L.A. Style (#1 BE, NLD, SP, #2 SWI)
- "Joy" – François Feldman (#1 FR)
- "Jump" – Kris Kross (#1 AUS, FIN, IRL, NZ, SWI, US)
- "Jump Around" – House of Pain (#3 US, NZ)
- "Just Another Day" – Jon Secada (#2 CAN, NLD, SWI)
- "Justified & Ancient" – The KLF (#1 AUT, FIN, NZ, SWE)
- "Keep the Faith" – Bon Jovi (#1 NOR, #3 SWI, #4 NZ)
- "Killing in the Name" – Rage Against the Machine
- "Knockin' on Heaven's Door" – Guns N' Roses (#1 IRL, #2 UK)
- "Laid So Low (Tears Roll Down)" – Tears For Fears (#8 IT)
- "Layla" (unplugged) – Eric Clapton (#1 CAN, JAP)
- "Le Chat" – Pow woW (#1 FR)
- "Les Mariés de Vendée" – Anaïs & Didier Barbelivien (#2 FR, #4 BE)
- "Let's Get Rocked" – Def Leppard (#2 NOR, UK, #3 SWI)
- "Lithium" – Nirvana (#3 FIN, #5 IRE)
- "Life Is a Highway" – Tom Cochrane (#1 CAN, #2 AUS, NZ)
- "Live and Learn" – Joe Public (#4 US)
- "Love Is in the Air" (Ballroom mix) – John Paul Young
- "LSI (Love Sex Intelligence)" – The Shamen (#4 SWE, #6 UK)
- "The Magic Friend" – 2 Unlimited (#1 FIN, #3 IRL, #4 BE)
- "Make It Happen" - Mariah Carey
- "Man on the Moon" – R.E.M. (#4 CAN)
- "Midlife Crisis" – Faith No More (#9 AUT, #10 UK)
- "A Million Love Songs" – Take That (#7 UK)
- "Mr. Wendal" – Arrested Development (#2 NZ, #4 UK, #6 US)
- "My Destiny" – Lionel Richie
- "My Lovin' (You're Never Gonna Get It)" – En Vogue (#2 US, #4 UK)
- "My Name Is Prince" – Prince (#7 UK)
- "Never Let Her Slip Away" – Undercover
- "Nothing Else Matters" – Metallica (#3 IRL, NOR, #5 BE, NLD, SWI, #6 AUT, UK)
- "November Rain" – Guns N' Roses (#3 IRL, NLD, US)
- "Nuthin' but a 'G' Thang" – Dr. Dre & Snoop Dogg (#2 US)
- "On a Ragga Tip" – SL2 (#2 UK, NLD, #3 IRL)
- "The One" – Elton John (#1 CAN, #3 FR, NOR)
- "One" – U2 (#1 CAN, IRL, #3 NZ)
- "One Love" – Dr. Alban (#3 IRL, #7 FIN, GER, #8 BE)
- "Open Sesame" – Leila K (#1 BE, #2 NLD, #3 IT)
- "Open Your Mind" – U.S.U.R.A. (#2 IT, #3 AUT, SWI, #5 NLD)
- "Out of Space" – The Prodigy (#3 NLD, #5 UK, #6 IRL)
- "Paradoxal Système" – Laurent Voulzy (#10 FR)
- "Parce qu'on est jeunes" – Benny B feat. DJ Daddy K (#2 BE, #5 FR)
- "Pas d'ami (comme toi)" – Stephan Eicher (#7 FR)
- "People Everyday" – Arrested Development (#2 UK, #6 AUS, FR, SWE)
- "Phorever People" – The Shamen
- "Piece of My Heart" – Erma Franklin
- "Please Don't Go" – Double You (#1 BE, NLD, SP)
- "Please Don't Go" – KWS
- "Remember the Time" – Michael Jackson (#1 NZ, #2 BE, CAN)
- "Revolution" - Arrested Development
- "Rhythm is a Dancer" – Snap!
- "Ride the Bullet" - Army of Lovers
- "Rien que de l'eau" – Véronique Sanson (#6 FR)
- "Rump Shaker" – Wreckx-n-Effect (#2 US)
- "Runaway Train" – Elton John & Eric Clapton (#10 IT)
- "Run to You" – Rage
- "Save the Best for Last" – Vanessa L. Williams (#1 US, AUS)
- "Sesame's Treet" – Smart E's (#2 UK, #4 IRL, NZ, #6 AUS)
- "Sexy MF" – Prince (#4 UK, #5 AUS)
- "Shake Your Head" - Was (Not Was)
- "Shame, Shame, Shame" - Izabella Scorupco
- "She's Playing Hard to Get" – Hi-Five (#5 US)
- "Sleeping Satellite" – Tasmin Archer (#1 UK)
- "Smells Like Teen Spirit" – Nirvana
- "Something Good" – Utah Saints (#4 UK, IRL)
- "Sometimes Love Just Ain't Enough" – Patty Smyth & Don Henley (#2 US)
- "Song of Ocarina" – Jean-Philippe Audin & Diego Modena (#1 FR)
- "Starship Edelweiss" – Edelweiss
- "Stay" – Shakespears Sister (#1 UK)
- "Step It Up" – Stereo MC's
- "Suzette" – Dany Brillant (#3 FR)
- "Sweat (A La La La La Long)" – Inner Circle (#1 BE, GER, NLD, NZ, SWI, #2 AUS, AUT, SWE)
- "Sweet Lullaby" – Deep Forest
- "Symphony of Destruction" – Megadeth
- "Take a Chance on Me" – Erasure (#1 UK)
- "Tears in Heaven" – Eric Clapton (#1 ARG, BRA, CAN, DEN, IRL, JAP, NZ, NOR, POL, TAI)
- "Temple of Love" – The Sisters of Mercy (#3 UK, #5 GER)
- "Tennessee" – Arrested Development (#6 US)
- "Tetris" - Doctor Spin
- "This Used to Be My Playground" – Madonna (#1 US, CAN, FIN, IT, SWE)
- "Thought I'd Died and Gone to Heaven" – Bryan Adams (#1 CAN, #8 UK)
- "Three Little Pigs" – Green Jellÿ (#5 UK, #6 AUS)
- "To Be with You" – Mr. Big
- "Too Funky" – George Michael (#2 IT, NOR, #3 AUS, NLD)
- "Too Much Love Will Kill You" – Brian May (#5 UK)
- "Twilight Zone" – 2 Unlimited
- "Under the Bridge" – Red Hot Chili Peppers (#1 AUS, BE, NLD, #2 US)
- "Viva Las Vegas" – ZZ Top (#7 SWE, #8 IRL)
- "Walking on Broken Glass" – Annie Lennox (#1 CAN, #8 UK, IRL)
- "We All Need Love" – Double You (#2 BE, #6 GER, #7 SWI)
- "We Got a Love Thang" – CeCe Peniston
- "Weather with You" – Crowded House (#7 UK)
- "What About Your Friends" – TLC (#7 US)
- "When I Look Into Your Eyes" – FireHouse
- "Wherever I May Roam" – Metallica (#1 FIN, #2 NOR)
- "Who Is It" – Michael Jackson (#3 POL, #5 AUT, BE, #6 CAN, IRL)
- "Who Needs Love Like That" (Remix) – Erasure (#8 IRL)
- "A Whole New World" – Peabo Bryson & Regina Belle (#1 US, #6 CAN)
- "Who's Gonna Ride Your Wild Horses" – U2 (#4 IRL, #5 CAN, SWI, #8 FIN)
- "Why" – Annie Lennox (#1 IT, #5 UK, IRL, #6 NOR, SWI)
- "Why Me?" – Linda Martin
- "Wishing on a Star" – The Cover Girls
- "Workaholic" – 2 Unlimited (#2 FIN, IRL, #4 NLD, UK)
- "Would?" – Alice in Chains
- "Would I Lie to You?" – Charles & Eddie (#1 AUT, GER, NZ, UK)
- "You" – Ten Sharp (#1 FR, NOR, SWE)
- "You Bring On the Sun" – Londonbeat (#5 NLD, #6 GER)
- "You Showed Me" – Salt-n-Pepa (#5 NLD, #7 BE, IRL)

== Notable singles ==
Song title	Artist(s)	Release date(s)	Other Chart Performance(s)
"Call Mr. Lee"	Television	1992	27 (U.S. Billboard Modern Rock Tracks)
"Connected"	Stereo MC's	September 1992	See chart performance entry
"Four Seasons in One Day"	Crowded House	June 1992	See chart performance entry
"Locked in the Trunk of a Car"	The Tragically Hip	October 1992	11 (Canada)
"Motorcycle Emptiness"	Manic Street Preachers	June 1992	See chart performance entry
"Only Shallow"	My Bloody Valentine	March 1992	27 (U.S. Billboard Alternative Airplay)
"Straight to You" b/w "Jack the Ripper"	Nick Cave and the Bad Seeds	March 1992	68 (UK Single Charts) - 96 (Australia)
"They Reminisce Over You (T.R.O.Y.)"	Pete Rock & CL Smooth	April 1992	1 (U.S. Billboard Hot Rap Tracks) - 10 (U.S. Billboard Hot R&B/Hip-Hop Songs) - 58 (U.S. Billboard Hot 100)
"Would?"	Alice in Chains	June 1992	See chart performance entry

=== Other Notable singles ===
- "Boss Drum" - The Shamen
- "Male Monster from the Id" - The Chills
- "Ripple" - The Church
- Trapped in a Box" - No Doubt
- "The Way I Made You Feel" - Ed Kuepper

== Top ten best albums of the year ==
All albums have been named albums of the year for their hits in the charts.

1. R.E.M. – Automatic for the People
2. Rage Against the Machine – Rage Against the Machine
3. Pavement – Slanted & Enchanted
4. Alice in Chains – Dirt
5. Tori Amos – Little Earthquakes
6. Dr. Dre – The Chronic
7. Faith No More – Angel Dust
8. Sublime – 40 Oz. To Freedom
9. Sonic Youth – Dirty
10. Beastie Boys – Check Your Head

== Classical music ==
- Torstein Aagaard-Nilsen – Arctic Landscape for Military Band
- Milton Babbitt
  - Septet, but Equal
  - Counterparts for brass quintet
- Leonardo Balada
  - Symphony No. 4 Lausanne
  - Celebracio for orchestra
- Mario Davidovsky – Synchronisms No. 10 for guitar and electronic sounds
- Lorenzo Ferrero
  - La ruta de Cortés (symphonic poem)
  - Movimento americano
  - Poi andro in America
- Peter Gahn – Auch ohne Sprache, for guitar
- Philip Glass – Symphony No. 1 Low
- Vagn Holmboe – Svaerm for string quartet (partially arranged from earlier violin duos)
- Elena Kats-Chernin – Clocks
- Ka Nin Chan – Saxophone Quartet
- Andreas Kunstein
  - String Quartet No. 1
  - 10 Epigrams for Toy Piano
- Witold Lutosławski – Symphony No. 4
- James MacMillan – Veni, Veni, Emmanuel (concerto for percussion and orchestra)
- William Mathias – Flute Concerto
- Younghi Pagh-Paan – U-MUL
- Krzysztof Penderecki – Symphony No. 5 Korean
- Alwynne Pritchard – Glimpsed Most Clearly from the Corner of Your Eye, for seven cellos
- Roger Reynolds – Kokoro, for solo violin
- David Sawer – Byrnan Wood
- Kurt Schwertsik
  - Uluru, Op. 64 for orchestra
  - Baumgesänge, Op. 65 for orchestra
  - Drei späte Liebeslieder, Op. 66 for cello and piano
  - Human Existence, for voice and chamber ensemble
- John Serry Sr. – The Lord's Prayer, for organ & chorus
- Karlheinz Stockhausen – Signale zur Invasion, for trombone and electronic music, or unaccompanied trombone
- Joan Tower – Violin Concerto
- Malcolm Williamson – Requiem for a Tribe Brother
- Iannis Xenakis – La Déesse Athéna (Oresteïa III) (1992), for baritone solo and mixed ensemble of 11 instruments

== Opera ==
- Antonio Braga – 1492 epopea lirica d'America
- Karel Goeyvaerts – Aquarius
- Ingvar Lidholm – Ett drömspel
- Jukka Linkola – Elina

== Musical theater ==
- Crazy for You – Broadway production opened at the Shubert Theatre and ran for 1622 performances
- Falsettos – Broadway production opened at the John Golden Theatre and ran for 487 performances
- Guys and Dolls – Broadway revival
- Jelly's Last Jam – Broadway production opened at the Virginia Theatre and ran for 569 performances
- The Most Happy Fella – Broadway revival

== Musical films ==
- Aladdin – Animated feature film by Walt Disney Animation Studios
- Deep Blues: A Musical Pilgrimage to the Crossroads
- Celibidache – You Don't Do Anything, You Just Let It Evolve (documentary by Jan Schmidt-Garre)
- Chnam Oun 16
- Khiladi
- The Muppet Christmas Carol
- Mushketeri dvadsat' let spustya
- Pure Country
- Roja – Tamil Indian film by Mani Ratnam
- Un cœur en hiver, featuring music by Maurice Ravel

== Soundtracks ==
- Aladdin Academy Award winner for Best Song and Best Film Score
- Batman Returns – score Danny Elfman
- The Bodyguard – Whitney Houston
- Boomerang – Boyz II Men, Tribe Called Quest, P.M. Dawn, Babyface
- Bram Stoker's Dracula
- Coneheads – Paul Simon, R.E.M., Red Hot Chili Peppers
- Cool World – David Bowie, The Cult, Ministry, Moby, Brian Eno
- Deep Cover – Dr. Dre & Snoop Dogg
- Far and Away – score by John Williams
- Juice – Naughty by Nature, Too Short, EPMD, Cypress Hill
- The Last of the Mohicans – score by Trevor Jones and Randy Edelman
- Lethal Weapon 3 – Eric Clapton, Sting
- Malcolm X – Arrested Development (group), Billie Holiday, Ella Fitzgerald, Ray Charles
- Mambo Kings – Los Lobos, Linda Ronstadt, Tito Puente
- Medicine Man – score by Jerry Goldsmith
- Mo' Money – Color Me Badd, Public Enemy, Bell Biv DeVoe, Janet Jackson
- Rush – Eric Clapton
- Singles – Alice in Chains, Pearl Jam, The Smashing Pumpkins, Jimi Hendrix, Soundgarden
- Sister Act – Etta James, Whoopi Goldberg, C+C Music Factory
- South Central – Scarface, Cameo (band), Boo-Yaa T.R.I.B.E.
- Toys – Tori Amos, Enya, Frankie Goes to Hollywood
- Wayne's World – Queen, Jimi Hendrix, Red Hot Chili Peppers, Alice Cooper, Black Sabbath

== Births ==
- January 2 – Alden Richards, Filipino actor, model and singer
- January 5 – Suki Waterhouse, English actress, singer-songwriter and model
- January 7 – Børns, American singer and songwriter
- January 12
  - Georgia May Jagger, English-American model and designer daughter of Mick Jagger
  - Jaguar Jonze, Taiwanese-Australian independent musician, singer songwriter, multi-instrumentalist and activist
- January 16 – Maja Keuc, Slovenian singer
- January 19 – Mac Miller, American rapper, singer, record producer, musician (d. 2018)
- January 20 – Maria Harfanti, Indonesian social activist, pianist, and beauty pageant titleholder
- January 21
  - Emma Birdsall, Australian singer-songwriter, contestant on The Voice Australia
  - Jim-E Stack, American musician, songwriter, record producer, and DJ (Charli XCX, Lorde, Kacy Hill, Lola Young)
- January 25 – Jordan Stephens, English musician, actor, and presenter. He is best known for being one half of Rizzle Kicks, and for presenting the ITV2 panel show Don't Hate the Playaz.
- January 28 – Simone Egeriis, Danish singer
- January 31 – Christopher Nissen, Danish singer
- February 3 – Milo, American rapper and producer
- February 7 – Jain, French musician and singer-songwriter.
- February 9 – Avan Jogia, Canadian actor, songwriter, poet, author and singer (in band with brother called "Saint Ivory") (Engaged to Halsey)
- February 14 – Elley Duhé, American singer-songwriter
- February 16 – Sega Bodega, Irish-Scottish music producer, singer, songwriter, DJ and co-head/founder of record label
- February 17 – Marika Hackman, English vocalist, multi-instrumentalist and songwriter.
- February 23 – Tabitha Nauser, Singaporean pop and R&B singer and musician
- February 29 – Majesty Rose, American singer
- March 3 – Brett Yang, member of violin duo TwoSet Violin
- March 6 – Sarah De Bono, Australian singer-songwriter, contestant on The Voice Australia
- March 9 – Cornelia Jakobs, Swedish singer-songwriter (Love Generation)
- March 7 – Im Hyun-sik, South Korean singer-songwriter
- March 10 – Emily Osment, American actress and singer
- March 17 – Ozuna, Puerto Rican singer
- March 14
  - Jasmine Murray, American singer
  - Kash Doll, American rapper
- March 24 – Jeremy Rosado, American singer
- April 3 – Young M.A., American rapper
- April 4 – Christina Metaxa, Cypriot singer-songwriter
- April 6 – Joy Oladokun, American singer-songwriter
- April 9
  - LD, British drill rapper
  - Joshua Ledet, American singer
- April 10 – Stella Donnelly, Australian indie rock singer-songwriter.
- April 11 – Naya, Lebanese singer
- April 16 – Ronnie Flex, Dutch rapper
- April 18 – Chloe Bennet, Chinese-American singer, actress and activist
- April 22 – Dyro, Dutch DJ, producer and musician
- April 23
  - Syd, American singer, songwriter, record producer, disc jockey, and audio engineer
  - Zelim Bakaev, Chechen singer
- April 26 – Jon Cozart, American musician and comedian (Dodie, Malinda Kathleen Reese, Thomas Sanders)
- April 27 – Allison Iraheta, American singer
- May 6
  - Baekhyun, Korean singer (EXO, SuperM)
  - Vanesa Gabriela Leiro, Argentine actress and singer
- May 8 – Chelcee Grimes, British singer-songwriter and footballer
- May 10 – Jake Zyrus (formerly Charice Pempengco), Filipino singer
- May 12 – Malcolm David Kelley, American rapper and actor
- May 15 – Clark Beckham, American singer
- May 19
  - Sam Smith, English singer-songwriter and activist
  - Moses Sumney, Ghanaian-American singer
  - Marshmello, American electronic dance music producer and DJ (Anne-Marie, Selena Gomez)
  - Lainey Wilson, American country singer
- May 21 – Chloe Angelides, American singer, songwriter and producer
- May 23 – Jinny Ng, Hong Kong Cantopop singer
- June 2 – Ethan Slater. American singer, actor and composer (worked with: Lilli Cooper, Ariana Grande, Michelle Yeoh and Keala Settle)
- June 4 – Nothing,Nowhere, American rapper, singer and songwriter
- June 14 – Princess Nokia, American rapper of Afro-Puerto Rican and Taíno descent
- June 20 – Sage the Gemini, American rapper (The HBK Gang)
- June 21 – Max Schneider, American singer-songwriter and actor
- June 25 – Dorian Electra, American singer-songwriter, musician, video and visual artist
- June 26
  - Melanie Amaro, American singer
  - Jennette McCurdy, American singer-songwriter, author, film maker, podcaster and former actress
- June 30
  - Prussian Blue (Lynx and Lamb Gaede), American twin pop musicians
  - Danielle Wade, Canadian actress and singer
- July 2 – William Singe, Australian rapper, singer-songwriter and YouTuber
- July 3
  - Maasa Sudo, Japanese singer
  - Nathalia Ramos, Spanish actress and singer
- July 5
  - Daisuke Sakuma, Japanese singer (Snow Man)
  - Mirna Radulović, Serbian singer-songwriter
- July 8 – Sky Ferreira, American singer, songwriter, model, and actress
- July 10
  - Angel Haze, American rapper, activist and singer-songwriter
  - Clara Luciani, French Singer
  - Harloe, American singer and songwriter
- July 11 – Karise Eden, Australian singer and activist
- July 13 – Rich the Kid, American rapper
- July 14 – Brytiago, Puerto Rican singer and songwriter
- July 15 – Porter Robinson, American DJ, record producer, and singer-songwriter
- July 15 – Koharu Kusumi, Japanese actress, model and singer (Morning Musume)
- July 18 – Bishop Briggs, British singer-songwriter and musician
- July 19 – Ellie Rowsell, English singer-songwriter and musician (lead vocalist and guitarist of the indie rock band Wolf Alice).
- July 22 – Selena Gomez, American singer-songwriter, actress, television producer, advocate and businesswoman (Friend and collaborator of: Taylor Swift & Britney Spears, lead member of Selena Gomez & the Scene, collaborator with Julia Michaels & Demi Lovato)
- July 27 – Tory Lanez, Canadian rapper, songwriter, producer
- August 2 – Charli XCX, British singer-songwriter, advocate, record executive, businesswoman, music video director and musician
- August 4
  - S-X, British singer
  - Tiffany Evans, American singer
- August 12 – Cara Delevingne, British singer/musician/actor/writer
- August 13 – Erika Henningsen, American singer and actress
- August 18 – Frances Bean Cobain, American artist, model, creator, activist, daughter of Kurt Cobain and Courtney Love
- August 19 – Feid, Colombian singer
- August 20 – Demi Lovato, American singer-songwriter, actress, advocate, philanthropist, entrepreneur, author and businessperson
- August 25
  - Emily Warren, American singer-songwriter, producer
  - Kaytranada, Haitian-Canadian DJ and record producer
- August 27
  - Kim Petras, German singer-songwriter
  - Blake Jenner, American actor & singer
- August 29 – Mallu Magalhães, Brazilian singer, songwriter and musician
- September 2
  - Madilyn Bailey, American singer and songwriter.
  - Rae Morris, British singer and songwriter
- September 9 – Leah Kate, American singer-songwriter
- September 11
  - Desireé Bassett, American guitarist and recording artist
  - MacKenzie Bourg, American singer
- September 12 – Shigga Shay, Singaporean rapper
- September 15 – Camélia Jordana, French singer
- September 16
  - Nick Jonas, musician and member of the American band Jonas Brothers, solo artist, songwriter, singer, musician, actor, businessman (Dated: Miley Cyrus, Selena Gomez, Delta Goodrem, married: Priyanka Chopra, brother of Joe Jonas)
  - Jack Roche, English singer and actor and member of band Push Baby and previous dated Jesy Nelson
- September 17 – Blxst, American rapper
- September 18 – Joji, Japanese-Australian singer-songwriter, rapper, record producer and former Internet personality (as Filthy Frank)
- September 25 – Teddy Swims, American singer-songwriter
- October 5
  - Rupi Kaur, Canadian-Punjabi poet and performer
  - Mercedes Lambre, Argentine actress, singer, dancer, and model
- October 10 – Gabrielle Aplin, English singer and songwriter
- October 7 – Grace Bawden, Australian independent classical crossover singer
- October 11 – Cardi B, American rapper and singer-songwriter
- October 16 – Anson Kong, Hong Kong singer (MIRROR)
- October 19 – Lewis Watson, English singer-songwriter. (Dodie Clark)
- October 20 – Liis Lemsalu, Estonian singer
- October 22
  - Carrie Hope Fletcher, English singer-songwriter, actress, author (friend of Emma Blackery)
  - 21 Savage, English-born American rapper
- October 24 – Leroy Clampitt (FKA Big Taste), New Zealand-born producer, singer-songwriter and multi-instrumentalist (Worked with: Madison Beer, Sabrina Carpenter, Broods, Ashe, Carlie Hanson)
- October 26 – Lido, Norwegian record producer, singer, and songwriter, frequent collaborator with Halsey
- October 29 – Andrea Lagunés, Mexican singer and actress
- October 30 – Greeicy Rendón, Colombian actress and singer
- November 3 – Jamie McDell, New Zealand alt-country guitarist and singer-songwriter
- November 5 – Ming Bridges, Australian-Singaporean singer-songwriter, actress and model
- November 10 – MC Guimê, Brazilian singer and rapper
- November 12
  - Giulietta, Australian singer-songwriter and dancer
  - Erika Costell, American singer-songwriter and musician
- November 19 – Tove Styrke, Swedish singer-songwriter
- November 20 – Jer Lau, Hong Kong singer (MIRROR)
- November 21
  - Conor Maynard, British singer
  - Davido, Nigerian singer
- November 23 – Miley Cyrus, American singer-songwriter, actress, performer and activist (formerly lead character on the Disney musical comedy Hannah Montana, worked with and supported Britney Spears)
- November 26 – Anuel AA, Puerto Rican rapper and singer
- November 27 – Chanyeol, Korean rapper, singer-songwriter and record producer (EXO)
- December 3 – JT, American rapper (one half of City Girls)
- December 4 – Jin, South Korean singer-songwriter and member of BTS
- December 8
  - Katie Stevens, American singer
  - Yui Yokoyama, Japanese singer and actress
- December 9 – Maelyn Jarmon, American musician, winner of The Voice, Team John Legend
- December 12 – Austin Jones, American singer, YouTuber and convicted child sex offender
- December 14 – Tori Kelly, American musician, singer and songwriter
- December 18 – Bridgit Mendler, American actress and singer
- December 24 – Dhurata Dora, Kosovo-Albanian singer
- December 26 – Jade Thirlwall, English singer-songwriter, dancer and member of Little Mix, activist, businesswoman
- December 28 – Gordi, Australian folktronica singer-songwriter

== Deaths ==
- January 14 – Jerry Nolan, drummer for The New York Dolls, 45
- January 15 – Dee Murray, bassist for Elton John, 45 (cancer)
- January 17 – Charlie Ventura, tenor saxophonist and bandleader, 75
- January 23 – Marie-Thérèse Gauley, French opera singer prominent at the Opéra-Comique, 88
- January 24 – Miklos Bencze, Hungarian-American operatic bass and voice teacher, 80
- January 27 – Allan Jones, singer and actor, 84
- January 29 – Willie Dixon, blues singer-songwriter and musician, 76
- February 12 – Stella Roman, operatic soprano, 87
- February 13 – Gyula Kovács, Hungarian drummer, 62
- February 21 – Jane Pickens Langley of the Pickens Sisters
- March 4 – Mary Osborne, jazz guitarist, 70 (liver cancer)
- March 8 – Champ Butler, American singer, 65
- March 10 – Giorgos Zampetas, Greek composer, 67
- March 20 – Georges Delerue, composer, 66
- March 21 – Shaik Dawood Khan, tabla virtuoso, 75
- March 27 – Harald Sæverud, composer, 95
- April 4 – Arthur Russell, cellist and disco musician, 40 (AIDS)
- April 20 – Johnny Shines, guitarist, 76
- April 25 – Yutaka Ozaki, Japanese singer, 26 (pulmonary edema)
- April 27 – Olivier Messiaen, composer, 83
- April 30 – Toivo Kärki, composer, arranger and producer, 76
- May 7 – Tiny Timbrell, guitarist, 75
- May 12 – Sylvia Syms, American singer, 74
- May 17 – Lawrence Welk, accordion player and bandleader, 89
- May 23 – Joyce Barker, operatic soprano, 60
- June 3 – Ettore Campogalliani, music teacher and composer, 89
- June 8 – Alfred Uhl, composer, 83
- June 18 – Peter Allen, Australian songwriter, 48 (AIDS)
- June 20 – Sir Charles Groves, conductor, 77
- July 4 – Ástor Piazzolla, tango musician and composer, 71
- July 5 – Paul Hackman, Canadian musician, 38 (car accident)
- July 21 – Aloys Fleischmann, composer and musicologist, 82
- July 25 – Alfred Drake, US singer and actor, 77
- July 26 – Mary Wells, Motown singer, 49 (laryngeal cancer)
- July 29 – William Mathias, composer, 57
- August 2 – Michel Berger, French composer and songwriter, 44 (heart attack)
- August 5 – Jeff Porcaro, drummer, Toto, 38 (heart attack)
- August 12 – John Cage, U.S. composer, 79
- August 16 – Mark Heard, U.S. singer, 40 (heart attack)
- September 19 – Sir Geraint Evans, operatic baritone, 70
- October 3 – Peter Klein, lyric tenor, 85
- October 5 – Eddie Kendricks, singer, (The Temptations) 52 (lung cancer)
- October 7 – Harold Truscott, composer, pianist, broadcaster and writer on music, 78
- October 25 – Roger Miller, singer, 56 (lung cancer)
- November 10 – Hilda Hölzl, operatic soprano, 65
- November 14 – Teddy Riley, New Orleans jazz trumpeter and bandleader
- November 21 – Severino Gazzelloni, flautist
- November 23 – Roy Acuff, "King of Country Music", fiddler, 89
- November 27 – Daniel Santos, singer and composer of bolero
- November 29 – Paul Ryan, singer, songwriter and record producer, 44 (cancer)
- December 9 – Cesar Gonzmart, violinist, 72
- December 10 – Kate Buchdahl, violinist, 28 (Hodgkin's lymphoma)
- December 15 – Otto Lington, composer, orchestra leader and violinist, 89
- December 21
  - Philip Farkas, horn player, 78
  - Albert King, blues guitarist and singer, 69
  - Nathan Milstein, violinist, 88
- December 26 – Nikita Magaloff, pianist, 80

== Awards ==
- Country Music Hall of Fame Inductees: George Jones and Frances Preston
- 1992 Country Music Association Awards
- Eurovision Song Contest 1992
- Filmfare Best Male Playback Award: Awarded to Kumar Sanu
- 34th Annual Grammy Awards
- 34th Japan Record Awards
- Mercury Music Prize: Awarded to Primal Scream for Screamadelica
- Ramon Magsaysay Award: Awarded to Ravi Shankar
- 1992 RTHK Top 10 Gold Songs Awards: First prize awarded to "暗戀你" sung by Jacky Cheung
- Rock and Roll Hall of Fame inductees: Bobby Blue Bland, Booker T. and the M.G.s, Johnny Cash, The Isley Brothers, The Jimi Hendrix Experience, Sam & Dave, and The Yardbirds

== Charts ==
- List of Billboard Hot 100 number ones of 1992
- 1992 in British music#Charts
- List of Oricon number-one singles of 1992

== See also ==
- 1992 in British music
- List of Billboard Hot 100 number ones of 1992
- Record labels established in 1992
