= Whipping boy (disambiguation) =

A whipping boy was a young boy educated with a prince and punished in his place.

Whipping boy or Whipping Boy may also refer to:

- Scapegoat, a person or group who is blamed for the sins, crimes, or sufferings of others
- In impact play, a person who is whipped for sexual pleasure
- Whipping Boy: The Forty-Year Search for My Twelve-Year-Old Bully, a book by Allen Kurzweil
- Whipping Boy (American band), a hardcore punk band active 1982–1989
- Whipping Boy (Irish band), a rock music band active 1988–1998 and occasionally since 2005
- Whipping Boy (album), 2000 album from the Irish band Whipping Boy
- Whipping Boy (film), 1996 Australian TV film
- The Whipping Boy, a 1986 children's book by Sid Fleischman, winner of the Newbery Medal
- "Whipping Boy", a 2001 song by Train from their album Drops of Jupiter
- "Whipping Boy", a song by Elton John on his album Too Low for Zero
