= Heartworm (album) =

Studio album by Whipping Boy
- Released: 1 November 1995
- Recorded: September – November 1994
- Studio: Windmill Lane Studios, Dublin, Ireland
- Length: 44:28
- Label: Columbia

Whipping Boy chronology
Submarine (1992)	Heartworm (1995)	Whipping Boy (2000)

Professional ratings
Review scores
Source	Rating
AllMusic	4.5/5 stars
Drowned in Sound	9/10
The Guardian	3/5 stars
Q	4/5 stars

Heartworm is an album by the Irish rock band Whipping Boy, released on 1 November 1995 on Columbia Records. It was recorded between September and November 1994 in Windmill Lane Studios, Dublin.

Heartworm was voted the seventh best Irish album of all time in a 2005 poll by the Irish magazine Hot Press. On 17 March 2013, it topped Phantom FM's poll of the top 50 Irish albums of all time.

== Release ==
The album was reissued on 3 September 2021 by Pete Paphides' Needle Mythology label on double LP and double CD, both formats containing an extra 10 B-sides and demos. Pre-orders announced in July included an art print signed by Page, McDonnell and Hassett. The double LP sold out almost immediately during the pre-order, prompting a second pressing. The first pressing made Heartworm chart for the first time in the Official Irish Albums Chart Top 50 (at number 8 on week ending 16 September 2021), with the album re-entering at number 4 in January 2022.

== Track listing ==
1. "Twinkle"
2. "When We Were Young"
3. "Tripped"
4. "The Honeymoon Is Over"
5. "We Don't Need Nobody Else"
6. "Blinded"
7. "Personality"
8. "Users"
9. "Fiction"
10. "Morning Rise"
11. "A Natural" (hidden track)

2021 Reissue CD2: B-Sides And Demos
No.	Title	Length
1.	"When We Were Young (Philo Version)"	2:54
2.	"I Am God"	3:20
3.	"Magnolia"	4:14
4.	"Caroline Says II"	3:35
5.	"Tripped (Live)"	3:50
6.	"We Don't Need Nobody Else (Acoustic Version)"	3:59
7.	"Disappointed"	4:17
8.	"Twinkle (Acoustic Version)"	4:18
9.	"As The Day Goes"	4:36
10.	"A Natural"	3:47

== Personnel ==
- Myles McDonnell – bass, backing vocals
- Fearghal McKee – vocals
- Colm Hassett – drums
- Paul Page – guitar
- The Dublin Symphony Orchestra

== Charts ==
Chart performance for Heartworm
Chart (2022)	Peak position
Irish Albums (OCC)	4
