= Stacy Earl =

American singer (born 1963)

- Born: March 11, 1963 (age 63); Boston, Massachusetts, U.S.
- Genres: Pop; dance
- Occupations: Singer; choreographer; dancer; actress
- Years active: 1978–present
- Label: RCA
- Website: www.stacyearl.net

Stacy Earl (born March 11, 1963) is an American dance/pop singer. She is best known for her singles "Love Me All Up" and "Romeo & Juliet" (a duet with The Wild Pair), both of which hit the Top 40 of the Billboard Hot 100 in 1992.

== Debut album ==
Earl, who grew up in Newton, Massachusetts, released her self-titled debut album on RCA Records in January 1992. The album featured two Top 40 singles: "Love Me All Up," which peaked at #26, and "Romeo & Juliet," which hit #27. A third single, "Slowly," peaked at #52. The album featured production work by Glen Ballard, Walter Afanasieff, Oliver Leiber [the producer responsible for Paula Abdul's hit singles "Opposites Attract," "Forever Your Girl," and "(It's Just) The Way That You Love Me)"], and Michael Sembello, among others. The remixes of "Love Me All Up," produced by Dave Shaw and Winston Jones, were also popular in clubs. The remixes were released commercially on vinyl only. Promo CD pressings of the single also featured the remixes and included one additional mix which was not on the 12" single. Remixes for the vinyl single of "Romeo & Juliet" were produced by Oliver Leiber, who also produced the album version. Sheet music was published. "Slowly" was never remixed, but a shorter radio edit was created for the cassette single.

In 1992, Earl won the Rising Star Award at the Boston Music Awards.

== Subsequent work ==
In 1993, Earl released a new song, "Blood from a Stone," which was recorded for and featured in the movie Untamed Heart starring Christian Slater and Marisa Tomei. The song was produced by John "Jellybean" Benitez. Although the commercial soundtrack release did not feature it, the song was released by RCA on cassette single (with the cover bearing the movie's official poster artwork). It featured an additional previously unreleased Stacy Earl song titled "The World Is Not a Stranger" on the B-side. A one-track CD promo single of "Blood from a Stone" was shipped to radio outlets, but no CD incarnation of the song was ever released commercially.

In 2006, Earl had a cameo role in the independent film Crazy. In one of the scenes, Earl performs the Hank Williams classic "Honky Tonk Blues" on stage. In 2009, Stacy Earl returned to music again and recorded two songs for the soundtrack for the movie The Fifth Quarter: "Live and Breathe" and "When It Came to Losing You," the latter being a duet with John Truscelli. Music videos for both can be found online.

In 2017, she reunited with Truscelli and recorded a featured track titled "The Devil Inside You" for the film Don't Sleep. The song can be found on SoundCloud.
