= 1992 in South Korean music =

The following is a list of notable events and releases that happened in 1992 in music in South Korea.

== Debuting and disbanded in 1992 ==
=== Groups ===
- N.EX.T
- Seo Taiji and Boys

=== Soloists ===
- Ha Soo-bin
- Kim Gun-mo
- Kim Jong-seo
- Kang San-eh
- Shin Sung-woo
- Lee Eun-mi

== Releases in 1992 ==
=== January ===
Date	Title	Artist	Genre(s)
Unknown	Joke, Lie and Truth (농담, 거짓말 그리고 진실)	SSAW	Jazz-rock fusion

=== February ===
Date	Title	Artist	Genre(s)

=== March ===
Date	Title	Artist	Genre(s)
20	My Song	Kim Kwang-Seok	Folk rock
23	Seo Taiji and Boys	Seo Taiji and Boys	K-pop

=== April ===
Date	Title	Artist	Genre(s)

=== May ===
Date	Title	Artist	Genre(s)

=== June ===
Date	Title	Artist	Genre(s)
1	Lisa in Love	Ha Soo-bin	Dance-pop

=== July ===
Date	Title	Artist	Genre(s)

=== August ===
Date	Title	Artist	Genre(s)
13	New Dance 2	Hyun Jin-young	Hip hop

=== September ===
Date	Title	Artist	Genre(s)

=== October ===
Date	Title	Artist	Genre(s)
1	Cho Yong Pil 14	Cho Yong-pil	Folk-pop
29	Sleepless Rainy Night	Kim Gun-mo	

=== November ===
Date	Title	Artist	Genre(s)
15	Sorrow	Yoon Jong-shin	

=== December ===
Date	Title	Artist	Genre(s)
