= Luka Bloom =

Irish folk singer-songwriter

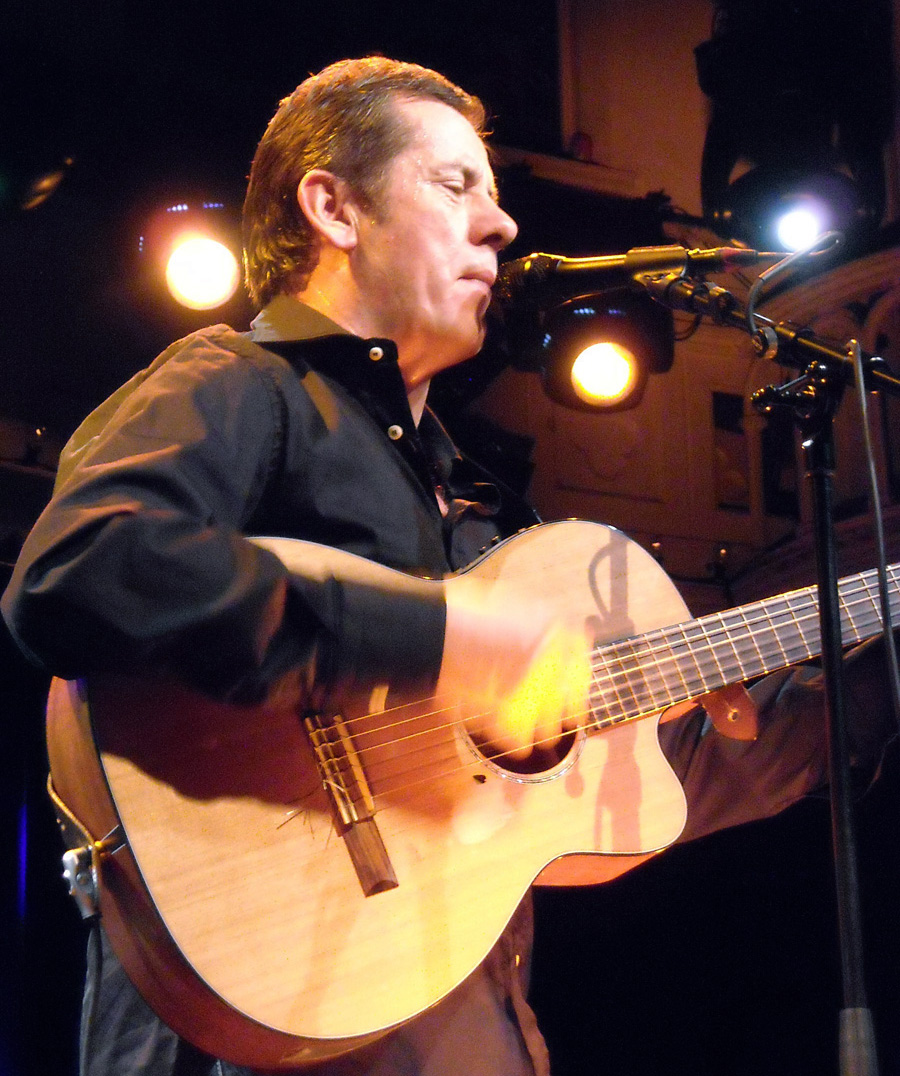
- Bloom performing in 2008

Background information
- Born: Kevin Barry Moore; 23 May 1955 (age 70); Newbridge, County Kildare, Ireland
- Genres: Folk
- Occupation: Singer-songwriter
- Instrument: Guitar
- Years active: 1969–present
- Labels: Big Sky; Shock Records; V2/BMG Records; Skip Records; Cooking Vinyl; Reprise/Warner Bros. Records; Bar/None Records
- Website: lukabloom.com

Kevin Barry Moore (born 23 May 1955), known professionally as Luka Bloom, is an Irish folk singer-songwriter. He is the younger brother of folk singer Christy Moore.

== Early life ==
Kevin Barry Moore was born on 23 May 1955 in Newbridge, County Kildare, Ireland. His parents were Andy Moore and Nancy Power, who had already raised three daughters and two other sons. Moore attended a Patrician Brothers primary school and later studied at Newbridge College. In college he formed the group Aes Triplex with his brother Andy and a school friend. He later attended a college in Limerick, but he dropped out after a couple of years to pursue a music career.

== Early career as Barry Moore ==
In 1969, 14 year old Barry Moore embarked on a tour supporting his eldest brother, Christy, at various English folk clubs. He subsequently spent all of his spare time practising and writing music. In 1976, Christy recorded one of his songs "Wave up to the Shore". In 1977, Barry Moore toured Germany and England as part of the group Inchiquin.

In 1978, Moore released his debut album, Treaty Stone. In 1979, having normally played guitar using a finger-picking technique, he was afflicted with tendinitis—forcing him to learn to play with a plectrum, which altered his guitar style. That year, he moved to Groningen in the Netherlands. In 1980, he recorded and released his second album, In Groningen. In 1982, he released his third album, No Heroes, which contained songs all written by Moore himself. For three years, from 1983 to 1986, Moore was the front-man for the Dublin-based band Red Square. During this time, in 1984, his son Robbie was born.

== Musical career ==
In 1987, Moore moved to the United States and began performing using the stage name of "Luka Bloom". He chose the name "Luka" from the title of Suzanne Vega's song about child abuse and "Bloom" from the main character in James Joyce's novel Ulysses. Initially he lived and performed primarily in Washington D.C., but in winter 1987 he moved to New York City. The following year, he released his first album – later withdrawn – under the name Luka Bloom.

In 1990, Bloom released his album Riverside, which included the song "The Man Is Alive". The album was recorded in New York, with its lyrics reflecting his experiences living and performing in that city. In 1991, Bloom returned to Dublin to record The Acoustic Motorbike, which included a cover version of LL Cool J's "I Need Love". The cover song was reviewed by Rolling Stone magazine, noting that "the prospect of a folksy Irish rocker covering a rap ballad may seem strange, but experimenting with different forms is precisely what keeps established traditions vital."

In 1993, Bloom again returned to Ireland to record the album Turf, this time with producer Brian Masterson and sound engineer Paul Ashe-Browne. The album attempted to capture the sound of a live performance, and was recorded in front of an audience that was asked to remain as quiet as possible. In 1998, Bloom released Salty Heaven, an album inspired by his return to Ireland.

Bloom's early albums showcased his frenetic strumming style (once described as "stadium rock for the bedroom"), including "Delirious", the debut track on Riverside, and his penchant for thoughtful cover songs, an affinity that he maintains even in more recent work. He had previously covered LL Cool J's I Need Love and Elvis Presley's Can't Help Falling in Love on the album The Acoustic Motorbike.

Released in 2000, Keeper of the Flame was an album of cover versions featuring renditions of ABBA's "Dancing Queen", Bob Marley's "Natural Mystic", and the Hunters and Collectors' "Throw Your Arms Around Me", among others.

Bloom's 2004 acoustic mini-album, Before Sleep Comes, was recorded while he was recovering from tendinitis. He stated that the purpose of the album was "to help bring you closer to sleep, our sometimes elusive night-friend".

In 2005, Bloom released the album Innocence. Some of the songs feature a new-found interest in Eastern European Romany music and other world music. The album features Bloom playing classical guitar, and the resonant plucking associated with that style of instrument. In his previous work, Bloom relied almost exclusively on steel-stringed guitars that created his distinctive style.

In 2007, Bloom released the album Tribe —a collaboration with County Clare musician Simon O'Reilly. O'Reilly composed the music and sent the recordings to Bloom for him to complete with lyrics and singing.

In February 2008, Bloom released a DVD titled The Man is Alive, featuring footage filmed in Dublin and at his home in Kildare, a question and answer session with fans, the documentary My Name is Luka, and a CD of music taken from the two performances.

In September 2008, Bloom released the album Eleven Songs, which featured an expanded ensemble of instrumentation, giving the album a distinct sound within his catalogue.

== Discography ==
=== Albums ===
- Treaty Stone (1978, as Barry Moore)
- In Groningen (1980, as Barry Moore, with Eamon Murray)
- No Heroes (1982, as Barry Moore)
- Luka Bloom (1988, withdrawn)
- Riverside (1990)
- The Acoustic Motorbike (1992) AUS #39
- Turf (1994) AUS #93
- Salty Heaven (1998) AUS #46
- Keeper of the Flame (2000)
- The Barry Moore Years (2001, compilation)
- Between the Mountain and the Moon (2001)
- Amsterdam (2003, live)
- Before Sleep Comes (2004)
- Innocence (2005)
- Tribe (2007)
- The Platinum Collection (2007, compilation)
- The Man Is Alive (2008, CD/DVDs)
- Eleven Songs (2008)
- Dreams in America (2010)
- This New Morning (2012)
- Head & Heart (2014)
- Frugalisto (2016)
- Refuge (2017)
- Breathe (2018, Meditation with Trea Heapes)
- Sometimes I Fly - Live in Bremen 2001 (2018)
- Live at De Roma (2020)
- Bittersweet Crimson (2020)
- Out of the Blue (2021, instrumental)
- Wave Up To The Shore (2022, Triple CD, 50 Songs 50 Years)
- A Second Wind (2025)
