= B'z TV Style Songless version =

Compilation album by B'z
- Released: February 2, 1992
- Genre: Hard rock
- Label: BMG Japan
- Producer: Tak Matsumoto

B'z chronology
B'z TV Style Songless version (1992)	B'z TV Style II Songless version (1995)

B'z TV Style Songless version is the first compilation album by the Japanese rock duo B'z. It is a karaoke compilation with instrumentals only. The album sold 231,340 copies in total, reaching #2 at Oricon.

== Track listing ==
1. Dakara Sono Te Wo Hanashite (だからその手を離して) - 3:51
2. Kimi no Naka de Odoritai (君の中で踊りたい) - 3:45
3. Oh!Girl - 4:11
4. Rosy - 4:55
5. Bad Communication - 7:23
6. Tonari de Nemurasete (となりでねむらせて) - 4:14
7. Be There - 4:14
8. Taiyou no Komachi Angel - (太陽のKomachi Angel) - 4:11
9. Easy Come, Easy Go! - 4:41
10. Itoshii Hitoyo Good Night... (愛しい人よGood Night...)- 6:16
11. Hot Fashion - 4:13
12. Lady Navigation - 4:21
13. Kodoku no Runaway (孤独のRunaway) - 5:03
14. Alone - 5:58
