= The Acoustic Motorbike =

Studio album by Luka Bloom
- Released: 1992
- Studios: STS, Dublin
- Genre: Folk
- Label: Reprise
- Producer: Paul Barrett

Luka Bloom chronology
Riverside (1990)	The Acoustic Motorbike (1992)	Turf (1994)

The Acoustic Motorbike is the second album by the Irish musician Luka Bloom, released in 1992. Its title refers to a joke made by Moore, comparing himself to the "Harley Davidson" that is Eddie Van Halen.

== Production ==
Recorded in Dublin, the album was produced by Paul Barrett. It includes cover versions of LL Cool J's "I Need Love" and Elvis Presley's "Can't Help Falling in Love". Bloom's brother, Christy Moore, played on the album, as did members of Hothouse Flowers.

Bloom used two acoustic guitars, named Rudy and Judy, on The Acoustic Motorbike, often in conjunction with effects pedals. The title track is about bicycling through Ireland; "Listen to the Hoofbeat" is about the mistreatment of Native Americans. Bloom rapped on a few of the album's songs.

== Critical reception ==
Professional ratings
Review scores
Source	Rating
AllMusic	3.5/5 stars
Calgary Herald	A
Chicago Tribune	2/4 stars
The Encyclopedia of Popular Music	3/5 stars
Entertainment Weekly	C+
The Indianapolis Star	2.5/4 stars
MusicHound Rock: The Essential Album Guide	4/5 stars
The Rolling Stone Album Guide	3.5/5 stars

Trouser Press wrote that the album "leans towards fuller, band-oriented instrumentation ... but it's unfocused, not entirely abandoning Riverside's simple melodicism but not forwarding that album's strengths, either." The Washington Post thought that Bloom's "new songs boast a restraint and focus that serve his husky voice and high-energy guitar strumming much better than his earlier overblown epics." The Indianapolis Star labeled The Acoustic Motorbike "bouncy and funny, and worth a few more listens."

Entertainment Weekly opined that "Bloom's most audacious move is a straight-faced cover of L.L. Cool J's rap ballad 'I Need Love', complete with gently thumping Celtic drum and fiddle... That it's the most striking cut on the album only serves to pinpoint Bloom's deficiencies." Spin deemed the title track "an environmental-age 'Magic Bus', a one-chord novelty tune that at this point is Bloom's best chance for cult success." The Calgary Herald concluded that "Bloom writes about the ridiculous exercise of living, openly confused at times, presuming nothing." The Chicago Tribune panned the "self-absorbed musings about love and life."

AllMusic wrote that, "while Bloom's second album expanded somewhat on his first record's stylistic range and maintained its urgency, it lacked the debut's exuberance."

== Track listing ==
All tracks are written by Luka Bloom, except where noted.

No.	Title	Writer(s)	Length
1.	"Mary Watches Everything"		4:10
2.	"You"		4:44
3.	"I Believe in You"		3:10
4.	"I Need Love"	Bobby "Bobcat" Ervin, Darryl Pierce, Dwayne Simon, James Todd Smith, Steve Ett	5:29
5.	"Exploring the Blue"		4:00
6.	"This Is Your Country"		3:49
7.	"The Acoustic Motorbike"		4:14
8.	"Can't Help Falling in Love"	George David Weiss, Hugo Peretti, Luigi Creatore	3:37
9.	"Bones"		2:12
10.	"Bridge of Sorrow"		3:43
11.	"Listen to the Hoofbeat"		3:04
12.	"Be Well"		4:16

== Charts ==
Chart (1992)	Peak position
Australian Albums (ARIA Charts)	39
