= Stacy Earl (album) =

Studio album by Stacy Earl
- Released: 1992
- Recorded: 1991
- Genre: Pop
- Length: 42:43
- Label: RCA
- Producer: Clif Magness; Glen Ballard; David Gamson; Michael Sembello; Danny Sembello; Ian Prince; Oliver Leiber; Paul Peterson

Stacy Earl is the debut album by the American dance/pop singer Stacy Earl, released on the RCA Records label in 1992. "Love Me All Up" and "Romeo & Juliet" were released as singles; both reached the Billboard Top 40.

== Production ==
Siedah Garrett and Glen Ballard worked on Stacy Earl. Earl chose the album's songs from a pool of around 500. The Wild Pair performed on "Romeo & Juliet".

== Critical reception ==
Professional ratings
Review scores
Source	Rating
AllMusic	2/5 stars
Chicago Tribune	2/4 stars
The Indianapolis Star	2/4 stars
The Republican	2/5 stars
St. Petersburg Times	1/5 stars

The Indianapolis Star wrote that "the best and most sonically original tracks are the disco-tinged 'Love Me All Up' ... and the melodic 'Do You Really Want My Love'." The Chicago Tribune noted that "synthesized dance tracks and sugary lyrics sung at a breathy high-pitch abound."

== Track listing ==
No.	Title	Writer(s)	Producer(s)	Length
1.	"Sho 'Nuf a Star"	Clif Magness; Glen Ballard; Siedah Garrett	Clif Magness; Glen Ballard	4:07
2.	"Just When I Needed a Friend"	Oliver Leiber; Paul Peterson	Oliver Leiber; Paul Peterson	4:22
3.	"Romeo & Juliet"	Oliver Leiber	Oliver Leiber	4:16
4.	"Do You Really Want My Love"	Mick Leeson; Peter Vale	Ian Prince	3:50
5.	"Can't Go On This Way"	Andy Mendelson	Ian Prince	3:43
6.	"Love Me All Up"	Danny Sembello; Dick Rudolph; Stacy Earl	Danny Sembello	4:57
7.	"Show Me"	Danny Sembello, Marti Sharron; Niki Haris	Danny Sembello; Michael Sembello	4:44
8.	"Slowly"	Mark Holden; Phil Galdston	Clif Magness	4:47
9.	"Rhythm in My Heart"	John Bettis; Walter Afanasieff	Ian Prince	4:05
10.	"Temptation"	David Gamson; Oliver Leiber	David Gamson; Oliver Leiber	3:52
