= Fifth Quarter =

The Fifth Quarter (or 5th Quarter) is an addition to a whole normally divided into four parts, usually referring to post-game activities after an American or Australian rules football game, which each are divided into four timing quarters. It may refer to:

- The Fifth Quarter (short story), written in 1972 by Stephen King
- The 5th Quarter, a 2011 film written, directed and produced by Rick Bieber
- The 5th Quarter, a marching band tradition played out primarily by HBCU bands, but also including:
  - The University of Wisconsin Marching Band's Fifth Quarter, a traditional post-game band performance
- The5thquarter.com, an online HBCU marching band forum named for this tradition
- Quinto quarto, offal as used in the cuisine of modern Rome
- fifthquarter.net, an online blog and forum dedicated to American College Football
