= Ha Soo-bin =

South Korean singer (born 1973)

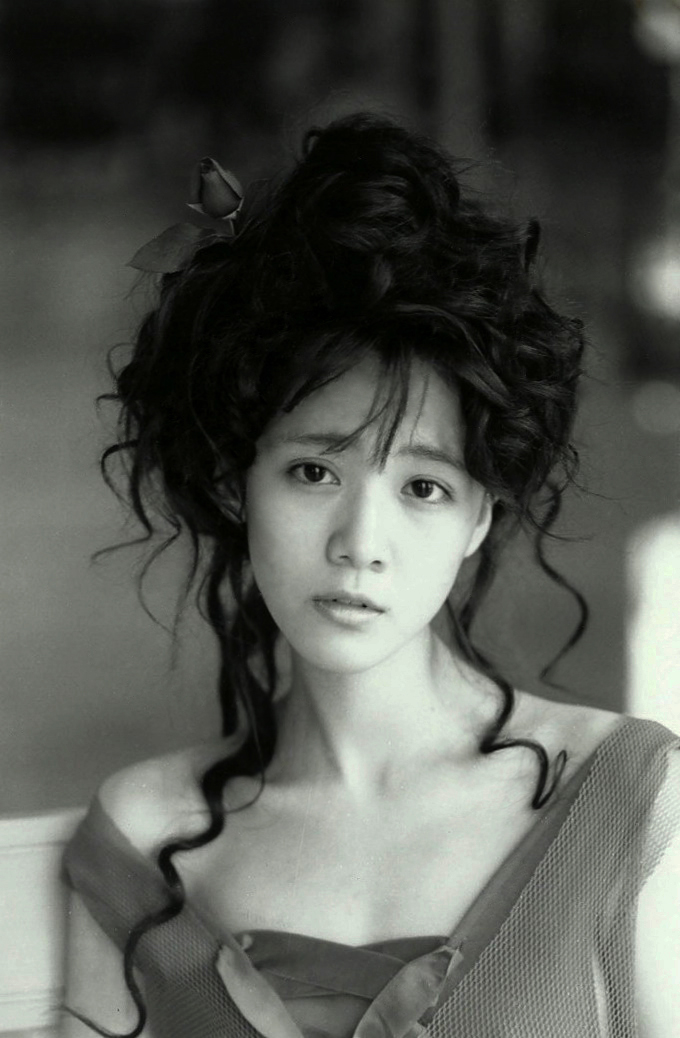
- Ha Soo-bin in 1993
- Born: May 3, 1973 (age 52); Seoul, South Korea
- Occupations: Singer; songwriter; music producer; architect; fashion designer
- Musical career
- Genres: K-pop; dance-pop
- Instruments: Vocals; piano; violin
- Years active: 1992–present
- Labels: Hyundai Records; La Stella; Sony Music Entertainment Korea
- Website: hasoobin.com

Korean name
- Hangul: 하수빈
- Hanja: 河琇彬
- RR: Ha Subin
- MR: Ha Subin

Ha Soo-bin (Korean: 하수빈; Hanja: 河琇彬; born May 3, 1973) is a South Korean singer, songwriter, music producer, architect, and fashion designer.

== Life and career ==
Ha Soo-bin was born in Gangnam District, Seoul as the youngest child in the Ha family and was raised a Roman Catholic. At a young age, she suffered from minor illnesses due to her weak immune system. Ha started listening to a variety of music at the age of three, from children's songs to classical music and pop music. At the age of five, she learned to play the piano and took up the violin many years later. Ha started writing songs, essays, and short novels during her teenage years.

While attending Gyesong Girls' High School and modeling for a clothing magazine, Ha met American singer-songwriter Tommy Page, who visited Seoul to do a commercial. According to Ha, Page gave her the nickname "Lisa" after Lisa Marie Presley, as he was often said to resemble Elvis Presley. Ha released her debut album Lisa in Love in 1992. The album features the singles "Deo Isang Naegeapeum-eul Namgijima" (Korean: 더 이상 내게 아픔을 남기지마; lit. "Don't Leave Me Any More Pain"), "No No No No No" (Korean: 노노노노노) and "I'm Falling in Love" - the latter written by Page and originally recorded on his 1992 album A Friend to Rely On. Lisa in Love sold over 100,000 copies. Her second album Ha Soo Bin II was released a year later to coincide with her 20th birthday and coming-of-age ceremony, but she suddenly left the music industry after the album's release. Ha returned to the music industry in 2010 with her third album The Persistence of Memory, but disappeared again after a series of TV performances and concerts.

Between the releases of Ha Soo Bin II and The Persistence of Memory, Ha moved to Canada to study music and was active in numerous business ventures in South Korea and overseas, from architecture to fashion.

== Discography ==
Albums

- Lisa in Love (1992)

1. "Deo Isang Naegeapeum-eul Namgijima" (Korean: 더 이상 내게 아픔을 남기지마; lit. "Don't Leave Me Any More Pain")
2. "No No No No No" (Korean: 노노노노노)
3. "Neoneun Naui Salang-ui Ileum" (Korean: 너는 나의 사랑의 이름; lit. "You Are the Name of Your Love")
4. "Haes-salgwa Gat-eun Geudaeui Miso" (Korean: 햇살과 같은 그대의 미소; lit. "You Smile Like the Sun")
5. "I'm Falling in Love"
6. "Ijhyeojyeo Ganeun Geon" (Korean: 잊혀져 가는 건; lit. "What Is Forgotten")
7. "Aleumdaun Neo" (Korean: 아름다운 너; lit. "You Are Beautiful")
8. "Salang-ui Walcheu" (Korean: 사랑의 왈츠; lit. "Waltz of Love")

- Ha Soo Bin II (1993)

1. "Geudae Naleul Tteonaganayo" (Korean: 그대 나를 떠나가나요; lit. "Are You Leaving Me?")
2. "Geudae Nun-e Jeoj-eun na" (Korean: 그대 눈에 젖은 나; lit. "I Am the Tears in Your Eyes")
3. "Nal Ij-eoya Hae" (Korean: 날 잊어야 해; lit. "You Must Forget Me")
4. "Majimag Sonyeogi (Byeol. Sonyeo)" (Korean: 마지막 소녀기 (별. 소녀); lit. "Last Girlhood (Star. Girl)")
5. "Na" (Korean: 나; lit. "Me")
6. "Cheoeum Salang Iyagi" (Korean: 처음 사랑 이야기; lit. "First Love Story")
7. "Nal Daesinhagie Chungbunhan Geudae" (Korean: 날 대신하기에 충분한 그대; lit. "You Are Enough to Replace Me")
8. "Geudae Naleul Tteonaganayo" (Remix)

- The Persistence of Memory (2010)

1. "Island (Nae Geuliun Nala)" (Korean: Island (내 그리운 나라); lit. "Island (The Country I Miss)")
2. "Memories"
3. "A Lovely Day"
4. "Ailiseu Jeong-won" (Korean: 아이리스 정원; lit. "Iris Garden")
5. "Noleuwei Sup" (Korean: 노르웨이 숲; lit. "Norwegian Forest")
6. "Palien Biga Wayo" (Korean: 파리엔 비가 와요; lit. "It's Raining in Paris")
7. "La Stella"
8. "Casablanca" (Korean: 카사블랑카; RR: Kasabeullangka)
9. "Lake Louise"
10. "Gobaeg" (Korean: 고백; lit. "Confession")
11. "Salanghan Hue" (Korean: 사랑한 후에; lit. "After Love")
12. "Yeoleum Banghag" (Korean: 여름 방학; lit. "Summer Vacation")
13. "The Winner"
14. "Sky Walker (Dedicated to My Fans)"
15. "Happy Birthday"
16. "OIA"
