= Me Phi Me =

American rapper

- Born: Laron Wilbur
- Origin: Flint, Michigan
- Genres: Alternative hip hop
- Occupation: Rapper
- Instrument: Vocals (rapping)
- Years active: 1988—present

Laron Wilbur (known professionally as Me Phi Me) is an American rapper from Flint, Michigan. Me Phi Me is both the name of the musical group and the name of its lead performer.

Wilburn was the youngest of five brothers and one sister raised in a home filled with diverse music. As a student in high school, he admired the lyrical virtuosity of hip-hop icons. The name Me Phi Me was born in 1987 as an homage to venerable historically black fraternities like Alpha Phi Alpha and Kappa Alpha Psi. It quickly evolved into a definition of intelligence and individuality as outlined in his song "...and I Believe," which features traditional frat stomp/stepping as the backbeat.

== Career ==
Known for rap as well as traditional lyrics, Me Phi Me provided an acoustic alternative to the popular gangster sound of the early 1990s.

His 1992 debut release ONE was produced by Chicago native and first cousin Christopher Cuben-Tatum (a.k.a. Cee Tha Wizzard) of Concept Enterprises International on BMG/RCA Records, and featured classic funk samples from Sly and the Family Stone, James Brown, and others layered with the unprecedented use of live twelve-string folk guitars, performed by John M. Falasz III, live jazz bass, traditional frat stepping or stomp, harmonica solos (Rags Murtagh a.k.a. Rags Murtaugh), and other unique organic instruments, including the haunting Armenian Duduk as performed by Djivan Gasparyan (Gladiator).

A track from the ONE CD, "Sad New Day," was released as a single, peaking at #83 on the Billboard Hot 100 in September 1992. The video was directed by Julien Temple, who also shot Me Phi's videos for "Black Sunshine" and "Pu' Sho Hands 2Getha," which enjoyed significant Buzz Bin play on MTV and BET.

From Murfreesboro, Tennessee (southeast of Nashville), Me Phi Me saw many of the songs from ONE featured in international television synchronization, most notable being the opening and closing theme for Robert De Niro's 1993 TriBeCa television drama anthology series on Fox.

In 1993, Me Phi Me's song "Revival!" was featured on the multiplatinum soundtrack to Ben Stiller's debut film about Generation X called Reality Bites. In 1995, director Kathryn Bigelow chose Me Phi Me's song "hereWEcome" as the theme for Jeriko One, a character in the futuristic movie Strange Days, in which Me Phi makes his big-screen debut alongside actor Glenn Plummer.

Me Phi Me is married with a stepdaughter named Gabrielle, plus two biological daughters Autumn and Imani by former wife Nannette. He actively assists his church choir in Baltimore, Maryland when not consulting at a Fortune Top 20 corporation (with fellow artist Nick Limneos). He continues to write music and rhymes, with plans for the release of previously unreleased songs.
