= Open Your Mind (song) =

- Deconstruction Records cover

Single by U.S.U.R.A.

from the album Open Your Mind
- Released: 1993
- Genre: Techno
- Length: 5:16 (classic mix); 3:40 (radio mix)
- Label: Italian Style; Deconstruction
- Songwriters: Charlie Burchill; Jim Kerr; Walter Cremonini; Derek Forbes; Michael McNeil; Claudia Varola; Michele Comis; Elisa Spreafichi; Claudio Calvello
- Producers: Walter Cremonini (original); Giacomo Maiolini ("Open Your Mind '97")

U.S.U.R.A. singles chronology
| "Open Your Mind" (1993) | "Sweat" (1993) |
| "In the Bush" (1996) | "Open Your Mind '97" (1997) | "Trance Emotions" (1998) |

Music video
- "Open Your Mind" on YouTube

"Open Your Mind" is a song by Italian electronic music group U.S.U.R.A., released as the debut single and title track from the group's only album, Open Your Mind (1993). Released in 1993 through Italian Style in Italy and through Deconstruction Records across the rest of Europe and Australia, it samples the song "New Gold Dream (81–82–83–84)" by Scottish band Simple Minds and a Marshall Bell quote from "Total Recall".

Following a period of underground popularity, "Open Your Mind" became a mainstream hit in early 1993, reaching the top five in Austria, Belgium, Finland, Italy, the Netherlands, and Switzerland and the top 10 in Germany, Ireland, and the United Kingdom. A 1997 remix by DJ Quicksilver failed to replicate the success of the original.

== Critical reception ==
Larry Flick of Billboard magazine called the track a "fast'n'furious romp, overflowing with stately strings, shoulder-shaking percussion, and more than a few imaginative vocal samples", citing the song's melody as the most productive component. In a later review, Flick doubted the song's commercial potential because of the lack of additional remixes, but he went on the write that "Open Your Mind" was "strong enough to merit a recurrent spin or two". On the 1997 release, he described it as a "disco-splashed twirler that is light on lyrics (think "open your mind" over and over and over) but heavy on rubbery rhythms and keyboard loops that permanently stick to the brain upon impact." He added, "Not likely to be a long-lasting entry but certainly a memorable one."

In his weekly UK chart commentary, James Masterton wrote, "Just to show that nothing is ever what it seems, even at a time when hardcore dance is losing its chart edge, a rave track can come from nowhere into the 10." A reviewer from Music & Media magazine described the song as having a "pace worth keeping up" and characterised it as a "stomper". Chris Finan from Music Week's RM Dance Update gave the 1997 remix four out of five, adding, "More cosmetic covering of the original without too much playing around has resulted in a definite commercial club-friendly track with the all-important crossover potential." Joe Muggs of Fact listed the track in his 2014 list of "35 stunners from back when progressive house wasn't terrible", calling it "Crass but brilliant – as is the none-more-nineties video".

== Music video ==
A music video was produced to promote the single. It features images of Joseph McCarthy, Benito Mussolini, Richard Nixon, Ian Paisley, Ronald Reagan, Josef Stalin, Margaret Thatcher and Mary Whitehouse.

== Track listings ==
=== "Open Your Mind" ===
- Australian CD and maxi-CD single
1. "Open Your Mind" (Restricted Mix edit) – 3:40
2. "Open Your Mind" (classic mix) – 5:16
3. "Open Your Mind" (Fishpop Mix) – 5:14
4. "Open Your Mind" (Tatata Mix) – 5:18

=== "Open Your Mind '97" ===
- European maxi-CD
1. "Open Your Mind '97" (DJ Quicksilver radio edit) – 3:02
2. "Open Your Mind '97" (original radio cut) – 3:01
3. "Open Your Mind '97" (DJ Quicksilver Remix) – 6:07
4. "Open Your Mind '97" (De Donatis Remix) – 7:45
- Australian maxi-CD
1. "Open Your Mind '97" (DJ Quicksilver radio mix) – 3:57
2. "Open Your Mind '97" (original radio cut) – 3:01
3. "Open Your Mind '97" (T.S. Triponphunky Remix) – 6:53
4. "Open Your Mind '97" (De Donatis Remix) – 7:46
5. "Open Your Mind '97" (M.U.T.E. Remix) – 4:50
6. "Open Your Mind" (original classic mix) – 5:18

== Charts ==
=== Weekly charts ===
Weekly chart performance for "Open Your Mind"
| Chart (1993) | Peak position |
|---|---|
| Australia (ARIA) | 29 |
| Austria (Ö3 Austria Top 40) | 3 |
| Belgium (Ultratop 50 Flanders) | 4 |
| Europe (Eurochart Hot 100) | 10 |
| Europe (European Dance Radio) | 1 |
| Finland (Suomen virallinen lista) | 4 |
| Germany (GfK) | 8 |
| Ireland (IRMA) | 6 |
| Israel (Israeli Singles Chart) | 14 |
| Italy (Musica e dischi) | 4 |
| Netherlands (Dutch Top 40) | 12 |
| Netherlands (Single Top 100) | 5 |
| Sweden (Sverigetopplistan) | 19 |
| Switzerland (Schweizer Hitparade) | 3 |
| UK Singles (Official Charts) | 7 |
| UK Dance (Music Week) | 2 |
| UK Club Chart (Music Week) | 5 |

Weekly chart performance for "Open Your Mind '97"
| Chart (1997–1998) | Peak position |
|---|---|
| Austria (Ö3 Austria Top 40) | 34 |
| Europe (Eurochart Hot 100) | 56 |
| Germany (GfK) | 64 |
| Italy (Musica e dischi) | 11 |
| Scottish Singles Sales (Official Charts) | 14 |
| UK Singles (Official Charts) | 21 |
| UK Dance (Official Charts) | 3 |
| UK Indie (Official Charts) | 1 |
| US Dance Club Play (Billboard) | 42 |

=== Year-end charts ===
Year-end chart performance for "Open Your Mind"
| Chart (1993) | Position |
|---|---|
| Australia (ARIA) | 94 |
| Belgium (Ultratop) | 19 |
| Europe (Eurochart Hot 100) | 37 |
| Europe (European Dance Radio) | 10 |
| Germany (Media Control) | 43 |
| Italy (Musica e dischi) | 37 |
| Netherlands (Dutch Top 40) | 58 |
| Netherlands (Single Top 100) | 57 |
| UK Singles (OCC) | 73 |
| UK Club Chart (Music Week) | 33 |
