= Hilda Hölzl =

Slovenian singer (1927–1992)

Hilda Hölzl (2 January 1927 - 10 November 1992) was a Slovenian dramatic soprano.

She was born at Belgrade and made her debut in Zagreb in 1957, singing the role of Leonora in Giuseppe Verdi's Il trovatore. She also played the role as Turandot in Puccini's Turandot.

She died in Ljubljana in November 1992.
