= Romantic Moments =

- German release cover

Compilation album by Yanni
- Released: February 17, 1992
- Recorded: 1986–1990
- Genre: Instrumental
- Length: 67:58
- Label: BMG
- Producer: Yanni

Yanni chronology
| In Celebration of Life (1991) | Romantic Moments (1992) | Dare to Dream (1992) |

Professional ratings
Review scores
| Source | Rating |
|---|---|
| AllMusic | 3/5 stars |

Romantic Moments is a compilation album by Greek keyboardist and composer Yanni. It was released on February 17, 1992, by BMG label.

== Track listing ==
| No. | Title | Original album | Length |
|---|---|---|---|
| 1. | "Reflections of Passion" | Chameleon Days (1988) | 4:35 |
| 2. | "Santorini" | Keys to Imagination (1986) | 4:34 |
| 3. | "After the Sunrise" | Out of Silence (1987) | 4:38 |
| 4. | "True Nature" | Reflections of Passion (1990) | 4:35 |
| 5. | "Almost a Whisper" | Reflections of Passion | 3:08 |
| 6. | "Swept Away" | Chameleon Days | 5:09 |
| 7. | "The Mermaid" | Out of Silence | 3:46 |
| 8. | "Flight of Fantasy" | Reflections of Passion | 5:41 |
| 9. | "Secret Vows" | Out of Silence | 3:55 |
| 10. | "Acroyali" | Out of Silence | 5:05 |
| 11. | "Song for Antarctica" | Polar Shift (non-Yanni album) | 4:23 |
| 12. | "Marching Season" | Chameleon Days | 5:34 |
| 13. | "Sand Dance" | Out of Silence | 5:10 |
| 14. | "In the Mirror" | (previously unreleased) | 3:54 |
| 15. | "Paths on Water" | Out of Silence | 3:51 |
