= Priest=Aura =

Studio album by the Church
- Released: 10 March 1992
- Recorded: 1991
- Studio: Studios 301, Sydney
- Genre: Alternative rock; neo-psychedelia; psychedelic rock; dream pop
- Length: 64:52
- Label: White (Australia); Arista (International)
- Producer: The Church and Gavin MacKillop

The Church chronology
A Quick Smoke at Spot's: Archives 1986–1990 (1991)	Priest=Aura (1992)	Sometime Anywhere (1994)

Singles from Priest=Aura
- 1. "Ripple" Released: 1992; 2. "Feel" Released: 1992

Professional ratings
Review scores
Source	Rating
AllMusic	link
Entertainment Weekly	4.5/5 stars
Rolling Stone	2/5 stars
The Rolling Stone Album Guide	4/5 stars

Priest=Aura (stylised as priest=aura) is the eighth album by the Australian alternative rock band the Church, released in March 1992. It peaked at No. 25 on the ARIA Albums Chart.

== Background ==
After touring their previous album, Gold Afternoon Fix (1990), with new drummer Jay Dee Daugherty (Patti Smith Group), The Church returned to Sydney's Studios 301 to commence work on new material. With lowered commercial expectations and less pressure from Arista Records, the atmosphere was more relaxed than the fraught L.A. sessions for their previous two albums. Bringing in British producer Gavin MacKillop (Barenaked Ladies, Toad the Wet Sprocket, Straitjacket Fits) to supervise the sessions, the band began to improvise the framework for the next set of songs. The use of opium and, for Kilbey, heroin, saw the material take on a more expansive and surreal quality, while Daugherty's occasionally jazz-like approach on drums brought a fresh change. Peter Koppes has said "When we made Priest = Aura we were completely opiated – we were getting opium from fields in Tasmania, where it was being grown by US pharmaceutical companies."

Titled Priest=Aura, from Kilbey's misreading of a Spanish fan's English vocabulary notes ('priest' = 'cura'), the album contained fourteen tracks, several over six minutes long. At nearly 65 minutes, it was their longest release so far. With song concepts derived from cryptic, one-word working titles (an idea originally proposed by Willson-Piper), the lyrics leaned towards the abstract and esoteric. Emphasising free association and undirected coincidence between music and motif, Kilbey declined to define their meanings. Sonically, the interplay between Koppes and Willson-Piper dominated throughout, especially on tracks such as "Ripple", "Kings", and "Chaos", whose lyrics were a reflection of Kilbey's unsettled lifestyle at the time.

Upon its release on 10 March 1992 (it was issued in the United States slightly before Australia), Priest=Aura had less chart success than any of its predecessors, although it peaked in the ARIA Albums Chart Top 30. It was given a mixed reception. Rolling Stone's Ira Robbins called the album "rich in texture" but with an "arid atmosphere". The band went on a sold-out tour of Australia (the "Jokes-Magic-Souvenirs" tour), as Kilbey prepared for the birth of his twin daughters, but after the final gig founding guitarist Peter Koppes announced his departure. Increasing personality conflicts, especially with Willson-Piper, who had been moonlighting with UK band All About Eve, combined with frustration over The Church's declining chart success had made the situation intolerable. Koppes would eventually return to guest with the band on their 1996 album Magician Among the Spirits and rejoined permanently in 1997.

Despite its muted reception at the time of release, Priest=Aura is considered by both the band and fan base to be an artistic high point. In 2011 the album, along with Untitled #23 and Starfish, was played in its entirety on the band's 30th Anniversary "Future, Past, Perfect" tour. In his 2014 autobiography, Something Quite Peculiar, Kilbey calls it their "undisputed masterpiece".

The original 1992 Australian release was bundled with the 1991 rarities album A Quick Smoke at Spot's: Archives 1986–1990.

A 2-CD remastered edition was released in Australia in 2005. The second disc included the tracks "Ripple" (single edit), "Nightmare", "Fog", "Feel" (extended mix), "Drought" and "Unsubstantiated".

In 2011, Second Motion Records re-released the album as part of their 30th Anniversary Remaster series, with the bonus tracks "Nightmare" and "Fog", in a cardboard sleeve with a booklet containing lyrics, photos and sleeve notes by Marty Willson-Piper.

== Track listing ==
All songs written by Kilbey/Koppes/Willson-Piper/Daugherty except "Mistress", by Kilbey/Koppes/Willson-Piper

1. "Aura" – 6:59
2. "Ripple" – 6:03
3. "Paradox" – 3:59
4. "Lustre" – 5:45
5. "Swan Lake" – 2:26
6. "Feel" – 3:55
7. "Mistress" – 4:12
8. "Kings" – 4:35
9. "Dome" – 4:00
10. "Witch Hunt" – 1:27
11. "The Disillusionist" – 6:24
12. "Old Flame" – 1:37
13. "Chaos" – 9:34
14. "Film" – 3:56
15. "Nightmare" – 3:39 (bonus track on reissued editions from 2011 onwards)
16. "Fog" – 3:31 (bonus track on reissued editions from 2011 onwards)

== Personnel ==
- Steve Kilbey – lead vocals, bass guitar, keyboards, guitar
- Peter Koppes – guitars, keyboards, backing vocals
- Marty Willson-Piper – guitars, backing vocals
- Jay Dee Daugherty – drums, percussion, keyboards

== Charts ==
Chart performance for Priest=Aura
Chart (1992)	Peak position
Australian Albums (ARIA)	25
US Billboard 200	176
