= One (Me Phi Me album) =

ONE

Studio album by Me Phi Me
- Released: 1992
- Genre: Alternative hip hop
- Length: 53:28
- Label: BMG/RCA
- Producer: Christopher Cuben-Tatum aka Cee Cee Tee (CCT)

One is the debut album by American alternative hip hop artist Me Phi Me. It was released in 1992 via RCA Records. Generally considered the first folk-rap album, One was a critics darling in the United States and Europe, though sales were limited. A fusion of acoustic guitars, spacey synthesizers, and live funk beats, the album established the Me Phi Me band as one of the more progressive hip-hop groups.

The guitar intro of "Keep It Goin'" was sampled for the song "Here We Come," which Me Phi Me recorded for the film Strange Days.

== Critical reception ==
Professional ratings
Review scores
| Source | Rating |
|---|---|
| AllMusic | 3/5 stars |
| Orlando Sentinel | 2/5 stars |

The New York Times called One "a radical departure," writing that "it's an odd mixture that uses pop music to express a democratic, pluralistic urge." The Chicago Reader called it "unquestionably the loveliest rap album ever recorded." The Washington Post hailed it as an album that "adventurous hip-hop fans should add to their collections."

AllMusic called the album "an intriguing concept -- few rappers have attempted a folk-rap fusion, especially ones with neo-psychedelic overtones -- but [Me Phi Me's] songwriting isn't always capable of conveying his ideas." The A.V. Club, in an article about the "least essential" albums of the 1990s, deemed the album's "hippified, folky space-rap" a trend that never caught on.

== Track listing ==
- 1. Intro: A Call to Arms (The Step) 1:54
- 2. The Credo 1:20
- 3. Sad New Day 5:28
- 4. Poetic Moment I: The Dream 3:74
- 5. Dream of You 3:56
- 6. Not My Brotha 4:17
- 7. Keep It Goin' 3:57
- 8. Poetic Moment II: The Streets :54
- 9. Black Sunshine 3:49
- 10. And I Believe (The Credo) 4:39
- 11. Pu' Sho Hands 2Getha 3:52
- 12. Poetic Moment III: The Light :31
- 13. Road to Life 4:24
- 14. It Ain't the Way It Was 4:59
- 15. (Think) Where Are You Going? 4:33
- 16. Return to Arms: In Closing :41

== Personnel ==
- Me Phi Me – Vocals
- Christopher Cuben-Tatum – Producer, Vocals, Bass, Keyboards, Drums
- John Michael Falasz III – 12-String Acoustic Guitars, Vocals
- Michael Franks – Background Vocals
- Rags Murtaugh – Harmonica
- Ladysmith Black Mambazo – Accent Vocals
- Djivan Gasparyan – Armenian Dudek
- Count Bass D – Frat Stepping, Vocals

== Chart positions ==
Billboard Music Charts (North America) – singles:

- 1992 Sad New Day Hot 100 Singles No. 60
- 1992 Pu' Sho Hands 2Getha R&B Singles No. 71
