= Miklos Bencze =

Hungarian-American bass singer

Miklós Bencze (19 June 1911 – 24 January 1992) was a Hungarian-American Jewish bass and voice teacher. He had a career in operas and concerts from the 1930s into the 1970s. He taught voice on the faculties of Baylor University (1958–1966), the University of Mississippi (1966–1976), and Wallace Community College (1976–1991).

== Biography ==
The son of Joseph Paul Bencze and Frieda Ellen Bencze (nee Heiman), Miklós Bencze was born in Budapest on 19 June 1911. He was first trained as a violinist, and did not begin studying singing seriously until 1933. After graduating with a degree in voice from the Budapest Conservatory in 1935, he pursued further studies in Rome with tenor Manfredo Polverosi. He performed with the Budapesti Operettszínház from 1937 to 1939; giving his first performance in a leading role as Sparafucile in Rigoletto in 1938. In his early career he worked primarily a concert singer, and only moved into wider opera career after the end of World War II. During the war he was a soldier in the Royal Hungarian Army.

Bencze became a member of the Hungarian State Opera (HSO) during the 1945-1946 season. He gave his first performance at the HSO as Ferrando in Verdi's Il trovatore. He remained a resident principal artist at the HSO for the next ten years. He concurrently worked as a guest soloist at other European opera houses. He was also active as a concert singer in Vienna and Innsbruck. Opera roles he performed included both Bartolo and Basilio in The Barber of Seville, Heinrich der Vogler in Lohengrin, Hunding in Die Walküre, Kecal in The Bartered Bride, Leporello in Mozart's Don Giovanni, Méphistophélès in Faust, Osmin in Die Entführung aus dem Serail, Pistola in Falstaff, Raimondo Bidebent in Lucia di Lammermoor, Ramfis in Aida, Prince Gremin in Eugene Onegin, the Sacristan in Tosca, and Timur in Turandot.

Bencze married Ilona Anna Szabari on 1 December 1946. He sang at the HSO until 1956 when the events of the Hungarian Revolution led him to decide to leave the country; first spending time in Yugoslavia and then Austria in 1956-1957. He emigrated to the United States where he arrived on May 5, 1957. He ultimately became a naturalized American citizen in 1962. In America he continued to perform periodically; performing with the Houston Grand Opera in 1961 and the San Antonio Opera in 1964. He was also the recipient of a Rockefeller Foundation grant in 1957, and was active as a soloist with American orchestras.

Bencze was a professor of voice and artist in residence at Baylor University in Waco, Texas; serving in that role from 1958 until 1966. He left Texas when he was appointed professor of voice and artist in residence at the University of Mississippi (UM) in 1966. He was officially recognized as an outstanding teacher by UM in 1971. In 1968 he performed Ramfis in Aida for the inaugural performance opening the Jackson Municipal Auditorium with the Jackson Opera Guild. He retired from the UM in 1976.

Bencze ended his career teaching voice at Wallace Community College in Dothan, Alabama where he was an artist-in-residence from 1976 until his retirement in 1991; being appointed to the post by Alabama's governor, George Wallace.

Bencze died in Dothan on 24 January 1992.
