= U.S.U.R.A. =

Italian electronic dance music group

- Origin: Brescia, Italy
- Genres: Eurodance
- Years active: 1991–1998
- Label: Deconstruction
- Past members: Claudio Varola; Michele Comis; Elisa Spreafichi

U.S.U.R.A. was an Italian electronic dance music group active from 1991-1998, best known for their crossover hit "Open Your Mind".

== History ==
U.S.U.R.A. was started by Time Records owner Giacomo Maiolini, producers Walter Cremonini and Alessandro Gilardi. The name is derived from that of Maiolini's mother, Ursula. The group is best known for the 1992-93 hit single (and later album) "Open Your Mind", featuring a dialog sample from the film Total Recall, as well as a vocal sound from "Solid" by Ashford & Simpson, and incorporating sampled elements from the Simple Minds song "New Gold Dream" from 1982. Its video morphs the faces of Ronald Reagan, Benito Mussolini, Joseph Stalin, Ian Paisley, Margaret Thatcher, Richard Nixon, Mary Whitehouse, and Joe McCarthy.

== Discography ==
=== Studio albums ===
Title	Album details	Peak chart positions
Title	Album details	AUS
Open Your Mind	Released: 1993; Label: Deconstruction	218

=== Singles ===
Year	Title	Peak chart positions											Album
Year	Title	ITA	AUS	AUT	BEL	FIN	GER	IRE	NED	SWE	SWI	UK	Album
1993	"Open Your Mind"	4	29	3	4	6	8	6	5	19	3	7	Open Your Mind
1993	"Sweat"	2	48	9	20	4	—	10	—	—	22	29	Open Your Mind
1993	"Tear It Up"	6	99	—	—	3	—	—	—	—	—	—	Open Your Mind
1994	"Drive Me Crazy"	10	—	—	—	11	—	—	—	—	30	—	Open Your Mind
1995	"Infinity"	3	—	—	—	—	—	—	—	—	—	—	single releases only
1995	"The Spaceman"	4	—	—	—	—	—	—	—	—	—	—	single releases only
1996	"Flying High"	24	—	—	—	—	—	—	—	—	—	—	single releases only
1996	"In the Bush"	20	—	—	—	—	—	—	—	—	—	—	single releases only
1997	"Open Your Mind '97"	11	—	34	—	—	64	—	—	—	—	21	single releases only
1998	"Trance Emotions"	—	—	—	—	—	—	—	—	—	—	—	single releases only
"—" denotes items that did not chart or were not released in that territory.
