= Submarine (Whipping Boy album) =

Studio album by Whipping Boy
- Released: July 1992
- Recorded: August 1991
- Studio: Sun Studios, Dublin, Ireland
- Genre: Shoegaze, Post-Hardcore, Noise rock
- Length: 43:17
- Label: Liquid Records

Whipping Boy chronology
Submarine (1992)	Heartworm (1995)

Professional ratings
Review scores
Source	Rating
Allmusic	2/5 stars

Submarine is the debut album by the Irish rock group Whipping Boy, released in July 1992 on Liquid Records.

== Track listing ==
1. "Safari"
2. "Beatle"
3. "Sushi"
4. "Favorite Sister"
5. "Astronaut Blues"
6. "Bettyclean"
7. "Buffalo"
8. "Snow"
9. "Valentine 69"
10. "Submarine"

== Personnel ==
- Colm Hassett - drums & bottles
- Myles McDonnell - bass & "kazzoo"
- Paul Page - Guitar & "Lost in space vocals"
- Ferghal E. McKee - vocals
