= Whipping Boy (album) =

Studio album by Whipping Boy
- Released: April 28, 2000
- Genre: Indie Rock, Chamber Pop
- Label: Low Rent

Whipping Boy chronology
Heartworm (1995)	''Whipping Boy'' (2000)

Professional ratings
Review scores
Source	Rating
Allmusic	4/5 stars

Whipping Boy is the third and final studio album of the Irish band Whipping Boy. It was released on April 28, 2000, on Low Rent Records.

== Track listing ==
1. "So Much for Love"
2. "Bad Books"
3. "Pat the Almighty"
4. "Mutton"
5. "Fly"
6. "That Was Then, This Is Now"
7. "One to Call My Own"
8. "Puppets"
9. "Who am I?"
10. "Ghost of Elvis"
11. "No Place to Go"
