= Whipping Boy (Irish band) =

Irish alternative rock band

- Origin: Kilkenny, Ireland
- Genres: Alternative rock, shoegazing, post-punk, noise rock, post-hardcore
- Years active: 1988–1998; 2005–2006; 2011–2012
- Labels: Columbia Records; Cheree Records; Liquid Records; Low Rent Records
- Members: Colm Hassett; Myles McDonnell; Fearghal McKee; Paul Page

Whipping Boy were an Irish alternative rock band who were active from the late 1980s until the late 1990s, releasing three full-length albums.

== History ==
Whipping Boy formed in Dublin in 1988, the band consisting of Fearghal McKee (vocals), Paul Page (guitar), Myles McDonnell (bass, vocals), and Colm Hassett (drums). They initially performed cover versions of songs by The Velvet Underground and The Fall, and went by the name Lolita and the Whipping Boy, shortening their name when their female guitarist left. After a couple of EPs on the Cheree label, they released their low-key debut album, Submarine, in 1992 on Liquid Records. Their live performances raised their profile, with McKee known to cut himself with broken glass on stage. The album was critically acclaimed though commercially unsuccessful, and led to a deal with Columbia Records, who issued the band's second album, Heartworm, in 1995, along with three minor hit singles. Heartworm received much critical acclaim, with AllMusic calling it "an earth-shatteringly powerful experience". The group split up in 1998 after being dropped by Columbia, leaving a third album unreleased. The self-titled album was eventually released in 2000 on their own Low Rent label.

The band reformed in September 2005, announcing several Irish dates. The original line-up disbanded finally in 2006. McKee and Hassett reformed the band in 2011 without the permission of Page and McDonnell. Their respective roles were assumed by Killian McGowan and Finn O'Connor. This line-up released a single called "No One Takes Prisoners Anymore" before disbanding once more in 2012.

== Discography ==
=== Studio albums ===
| Year | Details | Peak chart positions |
| Year | Details | IRL |
|---|---|---|
| 1992 | Submarine: Released: July 1992; Label: Liquid | — |
| 1995 | Heartworm: Released: 1 November 1995; Label: Columbia | 4 (Note: Heartworm charted at number 4 on the Official Irish Albums Chart Top 50 (week ending 13 January 2022) after being re-issued as a 20 track deluxe edition by Pete Paphides' Needle Mythology label) |
| 2000 | Whipping Boy: Released: 28 April 2000; Label: Low Rent | 65 |

=== Singles ===
- Sweet Mangled Thing EP (1989) (self-issued cassette-EP)
- Whipping Boy EP (1990) Cheree
- I Think I Miss You EP (1991) Cheree
- "Favourite Sister" (1992) Liquid
- "Twinkle" (1995) Columbia (UK No. 81)
- "We Don't Need Nobody Else" (1995) Columbia (UK No. 51, IRE No. 24)
- "When We Were Young" (1996) Columbia (UK No. 46, IRE No. 28)
- "Twinkle" (1996) Columbia (UK No. 55)
- "No One Takes Prisoners Anymore / Earth's Last Picture" (2012) Rocket Girl
