= Chris Cox (DJ) =

American DJ and musician

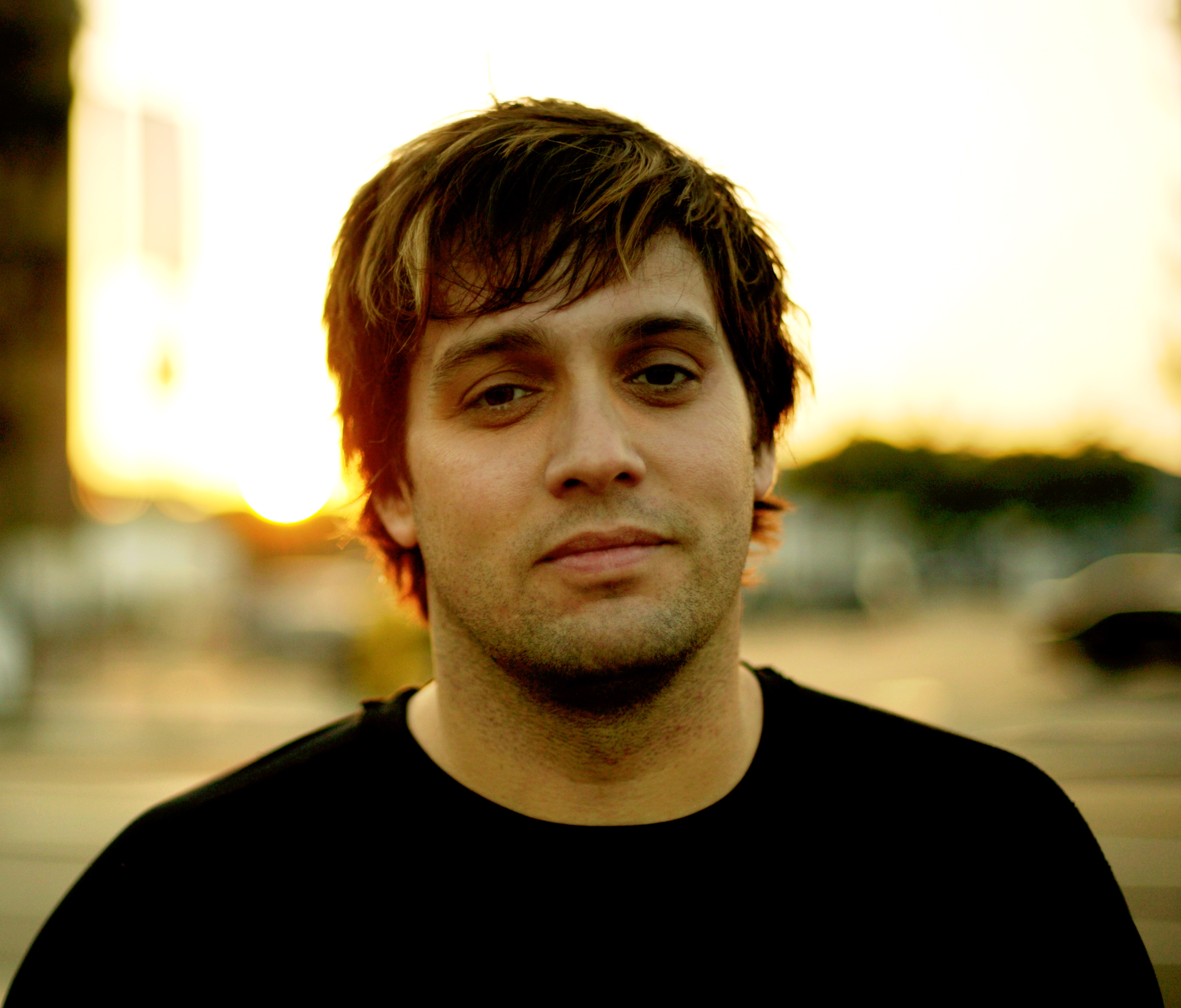
- Cox in 2004

Background information
- Born: Christopher Niles Cox; July 15; Oakland, California, United States
- Origin: Las Vegas, Nevada, United States
- Genres: House; dance; EDM; hi-NRG; progressive house; pop
- Occupations: DJ; producer; remixer
- Instruments: Synthesizer; guitar; bass; percussion; saxophone
- Years active: 1989–present
- Labels: Tommy Boy; Interhit; Provocative; Buildup
- Member of: Thunderpuss; Pusaka
- Website: chriscox.net

Christopher Niles Cox (born July 15) is an American dance music producer, remixer, and DJ who has worked on over 600 records throughout his career. His album 12 Inches of Cox was released in 2002.

== Career ==
As one-half of the production team Thunderpuss and as a solo artist, Cox has earned a total of 64 Billboard dance chart number one records. He has remixed songs performed by Madonna, Britney Spears, Christina Aguilera, Whitney Houston, Enrique Iglesias, Jennifer Lopez, Mary J. Blige, Céline Dion, Janet Jackson, and the Spice Girls. Cox was nominated for a Grammy in 2004 for his production work with Cher.

Since the dissolution of Thunderpuss, Cox has worked as a solo artist, and through collaborations with Pusaka. Cox has produced original music and dance remixes for Madonna, Rihanna, Michelle Branch, Hilary Duff, Donna Summer, Kelly Osbourne, and Kelly Clarkson.

For four years he was heard weekly on XM's BPM 81 with his hour-long set, "12 Inches of Cox". In 2008 he produced the album Hannah Montana 2: Non-Stop Dance Party, which spent several weeks at number one on the Billboard Dance/Electronic Albums chart.

== Remixography ==
=== 1989 ===
- Coldcut featuring Lisa Stansfield - "People Hold On"
- Bas Noir - "My Love Is Magic"
- Silver Pozzoli - "Love Is The Best"
- Yazz - "Stand Up for Your Love Rights"
- Inner City - "Ain't Nobody Better"
- Burrell - "Put Your Trust In The Music"
- Deep State - "Waiting For A Call"
- Pozitiv Noize - "I Feel Fine"
- Substance - "Illusions"
- Boy George - "You Found Another Guy"
- Michael Fortunati - "Tell Me Why"
- Sandra - "Everlasting Love"
- FAX Yourself - "(Walking On) Sunshine '89"
- Sinitta - "Right Back Where We Started From"
- JC Faxas - "Girl I Love You"
- Substance - "I Waited For You"
- Bobby Brown - "The Bobby Brown Megajam (Medley)"
- Cindy Valentine - "Pick Up The Pieces (To My Heart)"
- Rick Astley - "Ain't Too Proud to Beg"
- Shy Rose featuring Toney D. & The Lovetrip Orchestra - "You Are My Desire"
- Starlight - "Numero Uno"
- Bronski Beat - "Hit That Perfect Beat"
- Ministry - "Work For Love"
- Paula Abdul - "Opposites Attract"
- Prince - "Partyman"
- Dominatrix - "Dominatrix Sleeps Tonight"
- Reese & Steve "Silk" Hurley - "Chain Of Fools"
- Various Artists - "Best Of 1989 Medley"

=== 1990 ===
- Adam Ant - "Room At The Top"
- Duran Duran - "Burning The Ground / Decadance"
- Janet Jackson - "Escapade"
- Black Box - "I Don't Know Anybody Else"
- Milli Vanilli - "Milli Vanilli Coolli Medilli (Megamix)"
- Seduction - "Heartbeat"
- Cliff Richard - "Stronger Than That"
- MC Hammer - "U Can't Touch This"
- The E-Zee Possee featuring Dr. Mouthquake - "Love On Love"
- ABC - "The Look Of Love 90"
- Jamie Principle - "Date With The Rain"
- Janet Jackson - "Alright"
- Liza Minnelli - "Love Pains"
- Paula Abdul - "MEGAMIX for Shut Up And Dance LP"
- Black Box - "Everybody, Everybody"
- Cabaret Voltaire - "Keep On"
- Ernest Kohl - "Follow Your Heart"
- The Family Stand - "Ghetto Heaven"
- Mantronix - "Take Your Time"
- Power Jam featuring Chill Rob G - "The Power"
- The Crew - "Get Dumb"
- D-Mob - "Put Your Hands Together"
- Duran Duran - "Violence Of Summer (Love's Taking Over)"
- En Vogue - "Lies"
- Robert Michael Brawn - "Like A Boomerang"
- The Idolls - "Give A Dog A Bone"
- Cathy Dennis - "Just Another Dream"
- Dino - "Romeo"
- Janet Jackson - "Black Cat"
- Ernest Kohl - "Our Love Is Here To Stay"
- GQ - "Disco Nights (Rock-Freak)"
- K.C. & The Sunshine Band - "I'm Your Boogie Man/Shake Your Booty (Medley)"
- Kon Kan - "Liberty"
- Rick James - "Give It To Me Baby"
- The Adventures Of Stevie V - "Jealousy"
- Deee-Lite - "Power Of Love"
- The Cover Girls - "Funk Boutique"
- Various Artists - "The Best Of 1990 (Medley)"

=== 1991 ===
- Bingoboys - "How to Dance"
- Black Box - "Strike It Up"
- Cathy Dennis - "(Touch Me) All Night Long"
- Information Society - "How Long"
- Pat & Mick - "Use It Up & Wear It Out '91"
- Michael McDonald - "All We Got"
- Bananarama - "I Heard a Rumour"
- Enigma - "Mea Culpa"
- Kon Kan - "Better Day"
- Mantronix - "Step to Me (Do Me)"
- Nomad - "(I Wanna Give You) Devotion"
- Sheila E. - "Sex Cymbal"
- Bass-O-Matic - "Fascinating Rhythm"
- Crystal Waters - "Gypsy Waters"
- Sheila E. - "Droppin' Like Flies"
- The Brand New Heavies - "Never Stop"
- Cut 'N' Move - "Get Serious"
- Karyn White - "Romantic"
- Erasure - "Love to Hate You"
- Paula Abdul - "Promise of a New Day"
- Prince - "Cream"
- Lisa Stansfield - "Change"
- Michael Jackson - "Black or White"
- Bee Gees - "Night Fever"
- The Emotions - "Best of My Love"
- Blue Train - "All I Need Is You"
- Donna Summer - "Work That Magic"
- Bell Biv DeVoe - "BBD in Full Effect (Megamix)"
- Candyman - "Nightgown"
- Color Me Badd - "I Wanna Sex You Up"
- Duran Duran - "Girls on Film"
- The Human League - "Heart Like a Wheel"
- M.C. Hammer - "Here Comes the Hammer"
- Marky Mark and the Funky Bunch - "Good Vibrations"
- Paradise featuring Jahneen (Jeannine Otis) - "Over the Rainbow"
- Pete Shelley - "On Your Own"
- Sinitta - "Love Love Love"
- Siouxsie and the Banshees - "Cities in the Dust"
- Talk Talk - "It's My Life"
- Technodiva - "Party Up"
- The Associates - "Just Can't Say Goodbye"
- The Nails - "88 Lines About 44 Women"
- The Supremes - "Stoned Love '91"
- Thomas Dolby - "She Blinded Me with Science"
- TKA - "Crash"
- Vicki Shepard - "All I Ask of You"
- Celebrate the Nun - "You Make Me Wonder"
- U-Tek - "Das Mass Der Dinge"
- Egma - "Let the Bass Kick"
- 80 Aum - "Mindcontroller"
- L.A. Style - "James Brown Is Dead"
- Mylène Farmer - "Psychiatric"
- Mysterious Art - "High on Mystic Mountain"
- Outlander - "Vamp"
- The JAM's - "It's Grim Up North"
- John & Julie - "Double Happiness"

=== 1992 ===
- 2 Unlimited - "Get Ready For This"
- Luther Vandross & Janet Jackson - "The Best Things In Life Are Free"
- Michael Jackson - "Jam"
- Snap! - "Rhythm Is A Dancer"
- Lisa Stansfield - "Set Your Loving Free"
- My Life With The Thrill Kill Cult - "Sex On Wheelz"
- Stevie B - "Pump That Body"
- 49ers - "The Message"
- MC Serch - "Here It Comes"
- Sofia Shinas - "The Message"
- Cher - "Take Me Home"
- Various Artists - "The Best Of 1992 Medley"
- Bizarre Inc. featuring Angie Brown - "I'm Gonna Get You"
- Culture Club - "Time (Clock Of The Heart)"
- Donna Summer - "Work That Magic"
- Erasure - "Chorus"
- Felix featuring Jomanda - "Don't You Want Me"
- Hazell Dean - "Better Off Without You"
- Information Society - "Peace & Love Inc."
- Inner City - "Good Life"
- Jeff Johnson - "One More Chance"
- Kajagoogoo - "Too Shy"
- Kylie Minogue - "I Guess I Like It Like That"
- Lonnie Gordon - "Happening All Over Again"
- Midnight Shift - "California Dreaming"
- Midnight Star - "No Parking On The Dancefloor"
- Obsession - "If I Can't Have You"
- Paul Varney - "Sp Proud Of You"
- Sabrina Johnston - "Peace"
- Sir Mix-A-Lot - "One Time's Got No Case"
- Thelma Houston - "What He Has"
- Violent Vision - "Why?"
- Scream - "Scream"
- Anticapella - "2√231"
- Paris Red - "Good Friends"
- Ex-Plain - "Check Out"
- Mosaic 4 - "Dancing With Angels"
- The Other Two - "Tasty Fish"
- Anticapella - "Everyday"
- Adeva - "Don't Let It Show On Your Face"
- 2 Unlimited - "Twilight Zone"
- Code Red - "Dreamer Dream"
- Y-Decibel - "Strobophonic"
- Mindcontroller - "I Control Your Mind"
- Apotheosis - "O Fortuna"
- Molella - "Revolution"

=== 1993 ===
- Annie Lennox - "Little Bird"
- Peter Gabriel - "Steam"
- Rozalla - "Faith-Fly-Free Medley"
- Bobby Brown - "That's The Way Love Is"
- Captain Hollywood Project - "More & More"
- P.M. Dawn - "Looking Through Patient Eyes"
- P.M. Dawn - "Looking Through Patient Eyes"
- Freedom Williams - "Voice Of Freedom"
- RuPaul - "Back To My Roots"
- Joe - "I'm In Luv"
- RuPaul - "A Shade Shady (Now Prance)"
- Serious Rope presents Sharon Dee Clarke - "Happiness"
- Shaggy - "Oh Carolina"
- David Morales & The Bad Yard Club - "The Program"
- Donna Summer - "Heaven Knows"
- Ebn-Ozn - "A.E.I.O.U. & Sometimes Y"
- Paul Jabara - "Dance"
- Stevie Wonder - "Do I Do"
- Culture Beat - "Mr. Vain"
- Donna Summer - "Club Life '94"
- Joe - "The One For Me"
- 808 State - "10x10"
- Bananarama - "Movin' On"
- Digital Underground - "Same Song"
- DJ EFX - "Is It Like My Dil-Doe?"
- Donna Summer - "Don't Cry For Me Argentina"
- Dr. Dre - "Let Me Ride"
- Gloworm - "I Lift My Cup"
- House Of Pain - "Who's The Man"
- Jade - "Don't Walk Away"
- Jeff Johnson - "Whenever You're Lonely"
- Jesse Jaymes - "Shake It Like A White Girl"
- K7 - "Come Baby Come"
- Kon Kan - "S.O.L."
- Kon Kan - "Pardon Me/Rose Garden"
- Mars Plastic - "Find The Way"
- N 2 Deep - "Toss Up"
- N.R.G. - "I Need Your Lovin'"
- Naughty By Nature - "It's On"
- Paul Parker - "In My Wildest Dreams"
- Q-Bass - "Deepa"
- Tabu - "Knux To The Head"
- Tag Team - "Whoomp (There It Is)"
- Tene Williams - "Give Him A Love He Can Feel"
- The Goodmen - "Give It Up"
- R.I.P. - "Desole Madame"
- U96 - "I Wanna Be A Kennedy"
- Westbam - "The Mayday Anthem"
- Sequencial - "Schmittrigger"
- Egma - "Don't Have To Be Jesus"
- Trip 2001 - "Hysteria"
- Resist 101 - "Impulse"
- Lassigne Bendthaus - "Static"
- Trance Opera - "Maurice"
- Anne Clark - "Counter Act"
- Peter Kitsch - "Dad Laisse-Moi Conduire La Cad"
- Mylene Farmer - "Je T-Aime Mélancolie"

=== 1994 ===
- 2 Unlimited - "Maximum Overdrive"
- Lisa Lisa - "Skip To My Lu"
- Prince Of House - "Get It Started"
- Queen Latifah - "U.N.I.T.Y."
- Zhane - "Groove Thang"
- 2 Unlimited - "Throw The Groove Down"
- Brand New Heavies - "Dream On Dreamer"
- Lectroluv Remix Project - "The Difference"
- Staxx Of Joy featuring Carol Leeming - "Joy"
- Chanelle - "Work That Body"
- Coolio - "Fantastic Voyage"
- Ralphi Rosario featuring Xavier Gold - "You Used to Hold Me"
- Diana Ross - "Someday We'll Be Together"
- Laura Enea - "Catch Me Now"
- Ohio Players - "Fire '94"
- The Movement - "Bounce"
- Erasure - "Always"
- Inner City - "Do Ya"
- Pet Shop Boys - "Liberation pt. 1"
- Pet Shop Boys - "Liberation pt. 2"
- Volume 10 - "Pump"
- Barefoot Boys featuring Kim Lucas - "Need No Man"
- Jaki Graham - "Ain't Nobody"
- Weather Girls - "Can You Feel It"
- Giorgio Moroder - "Fantastic 4 TV Show (Animated)"
- Giorgio Moroder - "Swatch Irony TV Commercial"
- Bananarama - "Last Thing On My Mind"
- Black Evita - "Yo Mira"
- Cat Parr - "Destiny"
- Coolio - "Fantastic Voyage"
- Donna Summer - "La Vien Rose"
- Genecide - "Narrah Mindz"
- Hazell Dean - "My Idea Of Heaven"
- Hope - "Tree Frog"
- Jeff Johnson - "How Deep Is Your Love"
- Lighter Shade Of Brown - "Hey D.J."
- Obsession - "I'm Alive"
- Progression - "Reach Further"
- Psycho - "Redrum"
- Rappin' 4-Tay - "Playaz Club"
- Slo Moshun - "Bells Of N.Y."
- The Coming Out Crew - "Free Gay & Happy"
- The Outhere Brothers - "Fuk U In The Ass"
- The Outhere Brothers - "Fuk U"
- Visnadi - "Racing Tracks"
- Volume 10 - "Pump"

=== 1995 ===
- Jon of the Pleased Wimmin - "Passion"
- Taylor Dayne - "Say A Prayer"
- Outta Control - "Tonight It's Party Time"
- Zoo - "MEGAMIX (on Last Dance L.P.)"
- Barefoot Boys featuring Kim Lucas - "Need No Man"
- Cypress Hill - "Throw Your Set In The Air"
- E-40 - "Sprinkle Me"
- Giorgio Moroder - "The Chase (Remix)"
- H_{2}O featuring BIllie - "Satisfied"
- Heaven 17 - "Designing Heaven"
- Jeff Johnson - "How Deep Is Your Love"
- KMFDM - "Juke Joint Jezebel"
- KRS One - "MC's Act Like They Don't Know"
- Milkbone - "Where'z Da' Party At?"
- Patra - "Pull Up To The Bumper"
- Twinz - "Eastside LB"
- T.A.X.I. - "Get Ready For The Rhythm"
- Sweat Boys - "Sweat"

=== 1996 ===
- Alexia Phillips - "I Never Needed"
- Donna Summer - "Someday"
- Various Artists - "Mouse House Megamix"
- Ondina - "Into The Night"
- Raw Stylus - "Believe In Me"
- Outta Control - "Sinful Wishes"
- Jeff Johnson - "Sleeping Child"
- Gravity Kills - "Enough"
- Ultrahorse - "Telecom"

=== 1997 ===
- Kahuna - "Ole"
- Outta Control - "One Of Us"
- Barry Harris - "Filter Queen E.P."
- Donna Summer & Giorgio Moroder - "Carry On"
- Linda Imperial - "Two Out Of Three Ain't Bad"
- Linda Imperial - "All By Myself"
- Cynthiana - "Don't Speak"
- Ondina - "Summer Of Love"
- Capella - "Be My Baby"
- Datura - "Voo-Doo Believe?"
- DJ Supreme - "Tha Wildstyle"
- Outta Control - "Together In Electric Dreams"
- Patrizia - "Every Breath You Take"
- Sonic Dream Collective - "Don't Go Breaking My Heart"
- Donna Summer & Giorgio Moroder - "Carry On"
- Outta Control - "Take Control"
- Los Sombreros - "No Tengo Dinero"

=== 1998 ===
- Thunderpuss Presents Thea Austin - "I Just Wanna Be Your Everything"
- Jimmy James - "Who Wants To Be Your Lover"
- U.S.U.R.A. - "Open Your Mind"
- Billie Myers - "Kiss The Rain"
- Blonde Ambition - "Live To Tell"
- Chris Cox & DJ Irene - "E-Dreams"
- Chumbawamba - "Amnesia"
- Barry Harris - "Why'd Ya Let Her"
- Blenders - "McDonald's Girl"
- Linda Imperial - "Where The Boys Are"
- Vicious Flowerz - "Truly Madly Deeply"
- Engelbert Humperdinck - "Release Me/Gotta Get Release"
- Thunderpuss 2000 - "Godzilla"
- Thunderpuss 2000 - "Heroes"
- Steve Best - "If That's The Way You Want It"
- Cherry Poppin' Daddies - "Zoot Suit Riot"
- David Tyler Martin - "Some Kind Of Wonderful"
- Engelbert Humperdinck - "After The Lovin'"
- Engelbert Humperdinck - "Am I The Lover?"
- Engelbert Humperdinck - "Cuando, Cuando, Cuando (Spanish Mix)"
- Engelbert Humperdinck - "Gotta Get Release"
- Engelbert Humperdinck - "Last Waltz"
- Engelbert Humperdinck - "Man Without Love"
- Engelbert Humperdinck - "Mano a Mano"
- Engelbert Humperdinck - "Quando Quando Quando"
- Engelbert Humperdinck - "Release Me"
- Engelbert Humperdinck - "Spanish Eyes"
- Engelbert Humperdinck - "This Night"
- Engelbert Humperdinck - "When Love Finds Your Heart"
- Whitney Houston - "It's Not Right But It's Okay"
- Cynthiana - "Thank U"
- DJ Irene - "The Laughing Song"

=== 1999 ===
- Deni Hines - "I Like The Way
- Duke - "Greater"
- E-Magine - "Big Big World"
- D&G Core - "Belly Roll"
- Abigail - "Let The Joy Rise"
- Britney Spears - "Sometimes"
- Pusaka - "Praise The DJ"
- The Tamperer featuring Maya - "If You Buy This Record (Your Life Will Be Better)"
- Abigail - "If It Don't Fit"
- D-Cru - "Show Me The Way"
- Donna Summer - "Love Is The Healer"
- Mary Griffin - "We Can Get There"
- Chris Cox & DJ Irene - "Something Hard"
- Taylor Dayne - "Naked Without You"
- Louchie Lou & Michie One - "Body Rock"
- Whitney Houston - "My Love Is Your Love"
- Amber - "Sexual (Li Da Di)"
- Pet Shop Boys - "New York City Boy"
- Christina Aguilera - "The Christmas Song"
- Christina Aguilera - "What A Girl Wants"
- Eurythmics - "17 Again"
- Chris Cox & DJ Irene - "Something For The DJ's"
- Martay featuring ZZ Top - "Gimme All Your Lovin"
- Tamia - "Tell Me Who"

=== 2000 ===
- Amber - "Above The Clouds"
- 'N Sync - "Bye Bye Bye"
- Afrika Bambaataa & Soulsonic Force - "Planet Rock"
- Ayumi Hamasaki - "Trauma"
- Enrique Iglesias - "Be With You"
- Celine Dion - "I Want You To Need Me"
- Kina - "Girl From The Gutter"
- Afrika Bambaataa - "You Ask For The Moon"
- Harris & Cox - "Fuck Me Harder"
- Christina Aguilera - "I Turn To You"
- Fisher - "Anyway"
- Fisher - "I Will Love You"
- Fisher - "Miseryland"
- GTS featuring Loleatta Holloway - "Share My Joy"
- Jennifer Holliday - "Think It Over"
- Jennifer Holliday - "A Woman's Got The Power"
- Jennifer Lopez - "Feelin' So Good"
- Jocelyn Enriquez - "When I Get Close To You"
- Kim English - "Higher Things"
- Kina - "Me"
- Kristine W - "Clubland"
- Lara Fabian - "I Will Love Again"
- LeAnn Rimes - "Can't Fight The Moonlight"
- Madonna - "Don't Tell Me"
- Mirwais - "Disco Science"
- Nobody's Angel - "If You Wanna Dance"
- Outsiderz 4 Life - "Who Are You"
- TRF - "Silver & Gold"
- Ultra Naté - "Desire"
- Whitney Houston & Deborah Cox - "Same Script, Different Cast"

=== 2001 ===
- Garou - "Le Gitan"
- Geoffrey Oryema - "Omera John"
- Thunderpuss - "Papa's Got A Brand New Pigbag"
- Backstreet Boys - "The Call"
- Gloria Estefan - "Out Of Nowhere"
- Shalim - "Entregate"
- Bob Sinclar - "Freedom"
- Pusaka presents Thea Austin - "You're The Worst Thing For Me (I'm Addicted)"
- Brooke Allison - "The Kiss Off (Goodbye)"
- Ayumi Hamasaki - "Surreal"
- Ann Nesby - "Lovin Is Really My Game"
- Charlotte Church - "Tonight"
- Gerardo - "Ta Canon"
- Gerardo - "Ta Canon (En Espanol)"
- Gerardo - "Americana"
- Thunderpuss - "Temptation Island Theme"
- Amber - "Taste The Tears"
- Britney Spears - "Don't Let Me Be the Last to Know"
- Britney Spears - "I'm a Slave 4 U"
- Cher - "Song for the Lonely"
- Christina Aguilera, Lil' Kim, Mya & P!nk - "Lady Marmalade"
- Janet Jackson - "All For You"
- Jennifer Lopez - "Play"
- Kumi Koda - "Trust Your Love"
- Luther Vandross - "Can Heaven Wait"
- Madonna - "Thunderpuss GHV2 CLUB mix Pts.1"
- Madonna - "Thunderpuss GHV2 CLUB mix Pt. 2"
- Madonna - "Thunderpuss GHV2 Megamix"
- Madonna - "What It Feels Like for a Girl"
- Mandy Moore - "In My Pocket"
- Shakira - "Underneath Your Clothes"
- Shalim - "Lost Inside Of You" / "Nadie Como Tu"
- Sonique - "Love Is On Our Side"
- Sonique - "Sky"
- Spice Girls - "Tell Me Why"
- Suzanne Palmer - "Hide U"
- Tamia - "Stranger In My House"
- Thunderpuss featuring Latanza Waters - "Stand Up"
- We Are Family Foundation - "We Are Family"

=== 2002 ===
- Enrique Iglesias - "Hero"
- Mary J. Blige featuring Ja Rule - "Rainy Dayz"
- Britney Spears - "I'm Not a Girl, Not Yet a Woman"
- DJ Mike Cruz featuring Inaya Day - "Keep On Dancin"
- Brian McKnight - "Still"
- Enrique Iglesias - "Escape"
- Soluna - "Monday Mi Amor"
- Anastacia - "Boom"
- Amber - "Need To Be Naked"
- BoA - "Amazing Kiss"
- Amber - "Anyway"
- Gina G - "Stuck On You"
- Inaya Day - "Can't Stop Dancin'"
- Instant Funk - "Got My Mind Made Up"
- Jennifer Lopez - "Alive"
- LeAnn Rimes - "Tic Toc"
- Madonna - "Die Another Day"
- Mary J. Blige - "No More Drama"
- Shakira - "Ready For The Good Times"
- Stacie Orrico - "Stuck"
- Thunderpuss featuring Jocelyn Enriquez - "So Fabulous So Fierce"
- Valeria - "If You Feel The Night"
- Whitney Houston - "Try It on My Own"
- Whitney Houston - "Whatchulookinat"
- Widelife & Thunderpuss - "6 Feet Under"

=== 2003 ===
- Mylin - "Do It! Now"
- Anastacia - "Love Is a Crime"
- Boomkat - "The Wreckoning"
- Zoe Birkett - "Treat Me Like A Lady"
- Play - "I Must Not Chase The Boys"
- Beat Hustlerz featuring Thea Austin - "Just About Had Enough"
- Boomkat - "What U Do 2 Me"
- Aaliyah - "Got To Give It Up"
- Cher - "Love One Another"
- Chris Cox vs. Happy Clappers - "I Believe"
- Hilary Duff - "So Yesterday"
- Jordan Hill - "Babylove"
- Mylène Farmer - "Désenchantée"
- Shannon - "Megamix"
- Sonique - "Magic"
- Sonique - "Your Love Washes Away"
- Thunderpuss featuring Barnes - "Head"
- Thunderpuss featuring Thea Austin - "First Class Freak"
- Erotomania - "Digga Digga Da"

=== 2004 ===
- Calanit - "If You Come Back"
- Pete Tong & Chris Cox - "More Intensity"
- Pete Tong & Chris Cox - "Ku Da Ta"
- Sun - "One With You"
- Debby Holiday - "Dive"
- Gioia - "Wreckin' My Nerves"
- Britney Spears - "Chris Cox Megamix"
- Donna Summer - "I Will Live For Love (Dream-A-Lot's Theme)"
- Hilary Duff - "Come Clean"
- Hous'ton - "I Like That"
- Janet Jackson - "All Nite (Don't Stop)"
- Janet Jackson - "Megamix 04"
- Michelle Branch - "Breathe"
- Pete Lorimer & Chris Cox - "Dirty Stranger"
- Stacie Orrico - "I Promise"
- Tina Ann - "Rules Of Attraction"

=== 2005 ===
- Anna Vissi - "Call Me"
- Kelly Osbourne - "One Word"
- Pete Tong & Chris Cox featuring SK8 - "Deep End"
- Danielle Bollinger - "When The Broken Hearted Love Again"
- GTS featuring Luci Martin & Norma Jean - "Le Freak"
- Kaci Brown - "Unbelievable"
- Leana - "Dance With A Stranger"
- Mylène Farmer - "Q.I."
- Persephone's Bees - "Nice Day"
- SK8 - "Nation"
- SK8 - "Crazy For You"
- Stefy - "Chelsea"
- Young Love - "Discotech"

=== 2006 ===
- Walker - "So Deep"
- Vanessa Hudgens - "Come Back To Me"
- Christina Aguilera - "Hurt"
- Brit & Alex - "I Like Boys"
- Kelly Clarkson - "Walk Away"
- Kelly Rowland - "In Love With My Ex"
- Mink - "Glory Of Life"
- Mylène Farmer - "Peut-être Toi"
- SK8 - "Tina"

=== 2007 ===
- Turbofunk (Patrick Alavi) - "Gotta Move"
- Suzy Malick - "Feelin' Me"
- Leana - "Pack Your Bags"
- Shirley Bassey - "Get the Party Started"

=== 2008 ===
- Hannah Montana - "Bigger Than Us"
- Hannah Montana - "Chris Cox Megamix"
- Hannah Montana - "Life's What You Make It"
- Hannah Montana - "Make Some Noise"
- Hannah Montana - "Nobody's Perfect"
- Hannah Montana - "Old Blue Jeans"
- Hannah Montana - "One In A Million"
- Hannah Montana - "Rockstar"
- Hannah Montana - "True Friend"
- Hannah Montana - "We Got The Party"
- Hannah Montana - "You And Me Together"
- Brit & Alex - "Let It Go"
- SK8 - "Amnesty"
- Seal - "The Right Life"
- Chris Cox & Dave Dresden - "Whole Wide World"
- Tina Sugandh - "Break Me"
- Bob Sinclar presents Fireball - "What I Want"
- Rosabel featuring Tamara Wallace - "Looking For Men"
- Christina Aguilera - "Chris Cox Megamix"
- Fireball - "My Name Is Fireball"
- Celine Dion - "Because You Loved Me"

=== 2009 ===
- Shannon - "Let The Music Play"
- Storm Kaden - "Deja Vu"
- Storm Kaden - "Fearless"
- Storm Kaden - "Let's Hear It"
- Storm Kaden - "Touch"
- Tina Sugandh - "You Without Me"
- Jean-Phillippe Aviance starring Dihann Moore - "Giv Me Luv"
- Jipsta - "I Want Your Sex"
- Giulietta - "I Got A Plan"
- Giulietta - "Here We Go Again"
- Giulietta - "Walk Away"
- Naturi Naughton - "Fame '09"
- Richard Scotti featuring Miguelito LaMorté - "Was It Ever Love"
- Chris Cox, Trent Cantrelle, & Steven Lee - "Siren Says"
- Fall Out Boy - "Chris Cox Megamix"
- Blake Lewis - "Sad Song"
- Frankie Goes To Hollywood - "Relax"
- Giulietta - "Hands Up"
- Giulietta - "Lemme Know"

=== 2010 ===
- SK8 - "Into The Light"
- Jipsta - "Nasty Boy"
- Chris Cox & DJ Frankie - "Oh Mama"
- Big Boi - "Shutterbug"
- Jane's Addiction vs. Steve Porter - "Superhero"
- Athene Noelle - "Innamorata"
- Michael Bolton & Lady Gaga - "Murder My Heart"
- Jesse McCartney - "Shake"

=== 2011 ===
- Jipsta - "Party of the Year"
- Michael Jackson - "Monster"
- Hyper Crush - "Kick Us Out"
- Martin Clancy & The Witness Protection Programme - "You Can' Stop The Rain"
- Jipsta - "Too New York"
- Megan Nicole - "B-E-A-utiful"
- Sir Ivan - "Live For Today"
- Exposé - "Point of No Return 2011"
- Ellie Goulding - "Starry Eyed"
- ONO - "Talking to the Universe"
- Genevieve Mariko Wilson - "Turning Japanese"
- Chris Cox & DJ Tommy Rogers featuring Peyton - "Changin'"
- Chris Cox & DJ Frankie featuring Crystal Waters - "Oh Mama Hey"

=== 2012 ===
- Eva - "Body on Mine"
- Cosmo - "Naughty Party"
- Nelly Furtado - "Big Hoops (Bigger the Better)"
- SK8 - "One Love"
- Outasight - "Now or Never"

=== 2013 ===
- Clara Lofaro - "Born To Love You"
- Donna Summer - "Love to Love You Baby"
- will.i.am & Britney Spears - "Scream & Shout"

=== 2014 ===
- Amy Grant - "That's What Love Is For"
- Daft Punk & Avicii feat. Negin - "Derezzed (So Amazing)"
- Jade Starling - "Think About U"
- Katy Perry - "This Is How We Do"

=== 2015 ===
- Assia Ahhatt - "Six O'Clock In The Morning"
- B.o.B - "Back And Forth"
- Erasure - "Sacred"
- Erika Jayne - "Crazy"
- Jade - "Better And Better"
- JoJo - "When Love Hurts"
- ZZ Ward - "Love 3X"

=== 2016 ===
- Broadway For Orlando - "What The World Needs Now Is Love"
- Cole Plante X BOBI - "Teardrops"
- Derrick Barry - "BOOMBOOM"
- DJ Hollywood feat. Abri - "Love Me"
- Gwen Stefani - "Make Me Like You"
- Jonas Blue feat. JP Cooper - "Perfect Strangers"
- Karine Hannah & Dave Audé - "I'm Burning Up"
- Karine Hannah - "Victory"
- Kelly Clarkson, Chloe & Halle, Missy Elliott, Jadagrace, Lea Michele, Janelle Monáe, Kelly Rowland & Zendaya - "This Is For My Girls"
- Lodato & Joseph Duveen - "Older"
- Michael Franti & Spearhead – "We Are All Earthlings"
- Permanent Summer - "Ignite The Sky"
- Sanjoy - "Slip Away"
- Sheila Gordhan - "Smile"
- Sir Ivan - "Get Together"
- The Ritchie Family - "Ice"

=== 2017 ===
- Diana Ross - "Ain't No Mountain High Enough"
- Kat Graham - "Sometimes"
- Maty Noyes - "Say It To My Face"
- Niall Horan - "Too Much To Ask"
- Pavlova - "Burn Brighter"
- Sharon Needles - "Battle Axe"

=== 2018 ===
- Ariana Grande - "breathin'"
- Ashley Brinton - "Say The Word"
- Blair St. Clair - "Call My Life
- Cher - "Gimme! Gimme! Gimme! (A Man After Midnight)"
- Chris Cox & Lee Dagger feat. Ollie James - "Messin' With My Mind"
- Christine & The Queens - "5 Dollars"
- DaDa NaDa - "We Can Feel It"
- Debby Holiday - "Waiting For A Lifetime"
- Diana Ross - "I'm Coming Out/Upside Down 2018"
- JoAnna Michelle - "Blaze The Dance Floor"
- Lady Gaga & Bradley Cooper - "Shallow"
- Mean Girls - "Revenge Party"
- Sabrina Carpenter - "Almost Love"

=== 2019 ===
- Donna Missal - "Jupiter"
- Drew Schiff - "It's Just Today"
- Laroussi - "Lost"
- Mark Ronson feat. Lykke Li - "Late Night Feelings"
- Oliver Heldens feat. Shungudzo - "Fire In My Soul"
- P!NK & Cash Cash - "Can We Pretend"
- Piper Madison - "Little Bit Of Rain"
- Spanish Fly feat. Aki Starr - "Voices In My Head"
- Susie Vanner - "Windmills Of Your Mind"
- XIMXIA - "Don't Follow Me"

=== 2020 ===
- Dex Experience feat. Dawn Tallman - "Don't Underestimate Me"
- Jasmine Crowe - "Sky Is Falling"
- Jennifer Lopez - "Baila Conmigo"
- Jipsta - "Stomp"
- Kian Blume - "Basic"
- Laura Bryna - "Stars Are Falling"
- Madonna - "I Don't Search I Find"
- Peppermint Heaven - "New York City Nights"

=== 2021 ===
- Enrique Iglesias feat. Farruko - "Me Pase"
- Farruko - "Pepas"

=== 2022 ===
- Jade Starling - "So Alive"
- John Duff - "Is It A Sin"
- Peppermint Heaven - "1-2-3"
- Shab - "Sexual (Li Da Di)"
- Trucco feat. Uloni - "Medicine"

=== 2024 ===
- KATSEYE - "Touch"

=== 2025 ===
- Carly Paoli - "Inamorata"
