= Martin Clancy =

Irish musician

Martin Clancy is an Irish musician and songwriter behind several bands including The Witness Protection Programme.

In the early 1980s Clancy formed Irish band In Tua Nua alongside Leslie Dowdall, Jack Dublin, Vinny Kilduff, Ivan O'Shea, Paul Byrne and Steve Wickham. After signing to U2's record label, Mother, in 1984 and producing several hits including a cover of Jefferson Airplane's "Somebody to Love", In Tua Nua officially disbanded in 1990.

Clancy embarked on a series of musical projects including acting as manager and producer of Jack Lukeman.

Clancy served as Artist in Residence for the Seaport Music Festival from 2010-2012, during which he had a series of top 20 hits in the US Billboard Dance Charts. With Steve Dima, Clancy established Seaport Music Records.

Clancy earned his PhD in 2022, focusing on the ethics of artificial intelligence (AI) in music. Shortly afterwards, he released his first book, Artificial Intelligence and Music Ecosystem, published by Routledge. Edited by Clancy, the book contains essays on topics such as robotics, ethics, music in extended reality, and intellectual property and the law.

Clancy is also the chair of the IEEE Global AI Ethics Committee and has addressed the UN and EU about AI’s impact on the arts. He is also an Ableton Live certified trainer, teaching up-and-coming DJs and electronic musicians how to use the software for sound engineering, music theory, mixing, live performance, remixing, mastering, and more.
