= Do You See the Light (Looking For) =

1993 single by Snap!

Single by Snap! featuring Niki Haris
- Released: 10 May 1993
- Genre: Eurodance; hi-NRG; rave; ambient
- Length: 4:09 (7-inch); 6:39 (12-inch)
- Label: Logic; BMG Ariola
- Songwriters: John "Virgo" Garrett III; Benito Benites; Niki Haris
- Producer: Snap!

Snap! singles chronology
"Exterminate!" (1992)	"Do You See the Light (Looking For)" (1993)	"Welcome to Tomorrow (Are You Ready?)" (1994)

Music video
- "Do You See the Light (Looking For)" on YouTube

"Do You See the Light (Looking For)" is a song by German Eurodance group Snap!, released in May 1993 by Logic and BMG Ariola as the fourth and final single from their second studio album, The Madman's Return (1992). It features American singer Niki Haris, who also is credited for co-writing it. The song received positive rewiews from music critics; many of them were comparing it to the work of Giorgio Moroder. "Do You See the Light (Looking For)" reached number one in Finland while peaking within the top 10 in Austria, Belgium, Denmark, Ireland, Netherlands, Switzerland, and the UK. On MTV Europe, its accompanying music video received heavy rotation.

== Background and release ==
The original version of the song "See the Light" features vocals by American singer Thea Austin, a rap by former frontman Turbo B, and can be found on the 1992 Snap! album, The Madman's Return. Female vocals of this version of the song are often mistakenly reported to be by Penny Ford, a previous vocalist for Snap!. Remixes of "See the Light" were included on Snap!'s 1992 release "Rhythm Is a Dancer", which also feature vocals by Thea Austin.

This song is essentially a remix of their original song, "See the Light" with new lyrics written for the new front-woman Niki Haris, released in June 1993. "Do You See the Light (Snap! vs Plaything)", another remix, was released in August 2002.

== Critical reception ==
In his review of the song, Larry Flick from Billboard magazine felt that "someone has clearly been listening very carefully to those great old Giorgio Moroder records. Syncopated synth rhythms à la 'The Chase' are plentiful on this bracing, rave-friendly romp." Arion Berger from Entertainment Weekly praised it as the album’s "finest moment", describing it as "lilting" and "as lush as Soul II Soul's best work, and even the sequences of mush-mouthed rapping can't dull its gloss." Music writer and columnist James Masterton stated, "With a bassline reminiscent of 'I Feel Love' it is already a club smash". The Stud Brothers from Melody Maker also viewed the melody and beat as "an unabashed rip-off" of "I Feel Love", noting its "jubilant lyrics". Pan-European magazine Music & Media found that "this eagerly anticipated successor to the hugely successful 'Exterminate!' is a bit different from previous efforts, mainly because it's somewhat ambient. It's extremely recognisable, though, and with a liberal dash of Giorgio Moroder era Donna Summer, it's likely to do very well on both the dancefloor and the airwaves."

Alan Jones from Music Week rated the track four out of five, naming it Pick of the Week. He complimented the new singer, Niki Haris, that "has settled in extraordinary well", and described it as "another typically tense and NRG-etically smacking workout (shades of Giorgio Moroder abound), with enough melody in the haunting title refrain to make it another winner over the store counter as well as on the nation's dancefloors." Ian McCann from NME wrote, "The music, sampling what sounds suspiciously like Frankie's 'Two Tribes', is not so much modern dance as an attempted revival of the '70s Euro disco of Giorgio Moroder, minus the subtlety." Tim Jeffery from the Record Mirror Dance Update commented, "Introed by a very pop vocal and launching into a throbbing Hi-NRG grove, this is more commercial than their normal material. The production is a little lightweight, with the emphasis more on the melody than the bass and rhythm." He added, "Sure to be a chart hit, but not so big in the clubs as 'Rhythm Is a Dancer'." Siân Pattenden from Smash Hits gave "Do You See the Light (Looking For)" three out of five, describing it as "a Hi-NRG disco-type thing with no stupid rhymes."

== Chart performance ==
In Europe, "Do You See the Light (Looking For)" peaked at number one in Finland, and entered the top 10 in Austria, Belgium, Denmark, Ireland, the Netherlands, Switzerland, and the United Kingdom. In the latter, the single peaked at number 10 during its first week on the UK Singles Chart on 6 June 1993, and stayed within the chart for eight weeks. Additionally, it was a top-20 hit in Germany, Italy, and Sweden and a top-40 hit in France. In the group's native Germany, the song peaked at the same position for three weeks, after entering the German Top 100 singles chart three weeks earlier, at number 93. It spent a total of 17 weeks inside the chart. On the Eurochart Hot 100, "Do You See the Light (Looking For)" reached number nine on 26 June, having debuted on the chart four weeks earlier, at number 94, after charting in Belgium, Denmark, Germany, Italy and the Netherlands. On the European Dance Radio Chart, it reached number three same week. Elsewhere, the single peaked at number 86 on the ARIA singles chart in Australia and became a top-5 hit in Israel, peaking at number five on 15 June 1993.

== Music video ==
A music video was produced to promote the single, featuring Niki Haris. It is composed of a series of scenes of nature, opening with a desert landscape in sunrise. As the day continues, clouds are moving through the sky. In the middle of the picture is a constant golden frame, where Harris performs in. It appears throughout the whole video and she is surrounded by many lit candles. As the video ends, the sun goes down over the desert again. It received heavy rotation on MTV Europe in June 1993.

== Track listings ==
1993 version

- 7-inch single
1. Do You See the Light (Looking For) 7-inch (4:09)
2. Do You See the Light (Looking For) (Deep Ethno Dub 7-inch) (3:55)
- 12-inch single
1. Do You See the Light (Looking For) (12-inch) (6:39)
2. Do You See the Light (Looking For) (Dance 2 Trance Mix) (7:01)
3. Do You See the Light (Looking For) (Deep Ethno Dub) (6:09)
- CD single
1. Do You See the Light (Looking For) (7-inch) 4:09
2. Do You See the Light (Looking For) (Dance 2 Trance Mix) 8:01
3. Do You See the Light (Looking For) (12-inch) 6:39

2002 version

- CD single
1. Do You See the Light (Radio Edit) (2:57)
2. Do You See the Light (Original Mix)* (6:59)
3. Do You See the Light (Steve Murano Remix) (7:08)
- UK 12-inch single
1. Do You See the Light (Original Mix)*
2. Do You See the Light (Steve Murano Remix)
3. Do You See the Light (Push Remix)

Note: "Original Mix" refers to the original Snap Vs Plaything mix and not the 1992 or 1993 versions.

== Charts ==
=== Weekly charts ===
Weekly chart performance for "Do You See the Light (Looking For)"
Chart (1993)	Peak position
Australia (ARIA)	86
Austria (Ö3 Austria Top 40)	8
Belgium (Ultratop 50 Flanders)	5
Denmark (IFPI)	9
Europe (Eurochart Hot 100)	9
Europe (European Dance Radio)	3
Europe (European Hit Radio)	20
Finland (Suomen virallinen lista)	2
France (SNEP)	40
Germany (GfK)	13
Ireland (IRMA)	9
Israel (Israeli Singles Chart)	5
Italy (Musica e dischi)	12
Netherlands (Dutch Top 40)	9
Netherlands (Single Top 100)	9
Sweden (Sverigetopplistan)	20
Switzerland (Schweizer Hitparade)	10
UK Singles (Official Charts)	10
UK Airplay (Music Week)	11
UK Dance (Music Week)	4
UK Club Chart (Music Week)	3

=== Year-end charts ===
Year-end chart performance for "Do You See the Light (Looking For)"
Chart (1993)	Position
Belgium (Ultratop 50 Flanders)	33
Europe (Eurochart Hot 100)	73
Germany (Media Control)	56
Netherlands (Dutch Top 40)	42
Netherlands (Single Top 100)	62
UK Singles (OCC)	98

== Release history ==
Region	Date	Format(s)	Label(s)	Ref.
Europe	10 May 1993	7-inch vinyl; CD	Logic; BMG Ariola München GmbH	
United Kingdom	1 June 1993	7-inch vinyl; 12-inch vinyl; CD; cassette	Logic	
