= Miguelito =

Miguelito may refer to:

- Miguelito (singer) (born 1999), Puerto Rican reggaeton singer
- Miguelito (footballer, born 1981), Portuguese football wingback
- Miguelito (footballer, born March 1990), Portuguese football midfielder
- Miguelito (footballer, born December 1990), Spanish football attacking midfielder
- Miguelito Guerrero, a character from 2023 Philippine action TV series FPJ's Batang Quiapo
- Miguelito LaMorté
- Miguel Terceros, also nicknamed Miguelito, Bolivian footballer
- Miguelitos, a type of cake
