= The Madman's Return =

Studio album by Snap!
- Released: 24 March 1992
- Recorded: 1991–1992
- Genre: Eurodance
- Length: 41:00 (original eight-track disc)
- Labels: Anzilotti & Munzing; Arista
- Producer: Snap!

Snap! chronology
World Power (1990)	The Madman's Return (1992)	Welcome to Tomorrow (1994)

Singles from The Madman's Return
- 1. "Colour of Love" Released: 9 December 1991; 2. "Rhythm Is a Dancer" Released: 30 March 1992; 3. "Exterminate!" Released: 7 December 1992; 4. "Do You See the Light (Looking For)" Released: 4 July 1993

The Madman's Return is the second studio album by German Eurodance group Snap! It contains the international hit "Rhythm Is a Dancer", which reached No. 1 in France, Ireland, Italy, the Netherlands, Germany and the United Kingdom and peaked at No. 5 in the US and Canada. The album was certified platinum in Switzerland and gold in Germany, Austria and the United Kingdom but only reached No. 121 on the US Billboard 200.

The earliest LP pressings did not contain "Rhythm Is a Dancer". The album produced four singles; "Colour of Love", "Rhythm Is a Dancer", "Exterminate!" and "Do You See The Light (Looking For)".

== Critical reception ==
Professional ratings
Review scores
Source	Rating
AllMusic	3/5 stars
Calgary Herald	B+
The Encyclopedia of Popular Music	3/5 stars
Entertainment Weekly	3/4
Music Week	4/5 stars

AllMusic highlighted songs like "Rhythm Is a Dancer", "Don't Be Shy", "Believe in It", "Colour of Love", and "Who Stole It?" as "standout" tracks of the album, adding that the latter has a sound that recalls one of the group's earlier hits, "The Power". Billboard complimented new singer Thea Austin, who "does an admirable job" especially on "See the Light", and remarked that "Who Stole It?" "could break big." Arion Berger from Entertainment Weekly also highlighted "Who Stole It?", with its "fuzzy, stop-start hook". He also felt that the band "proves its talent for complex, hard-hitting dance beats" on the "eerie, futuristic" "Ex-Terminator", and "a witty warning to female gold diggers" on "Money". Berger named "See the Light" the album's "finest moment", describing it as "lilting" and "as lush as Soul II Soul's best work, and even the sequences of mush-mouthed rapping can’t dull its gloss." A reviewer from Melody Maker named "Colour of Love" the "highlight" of the album.

== Track listing ==
All music is composed by Benito Benites and John "Virgo" Garrett III.

First edition
No.	Title	Lyrics	Length
1.	"Madman's Return"	Durron Butler	4:35
2.	"Colour of Love"	Butler; Penny Ford; Thea Austin	5:32
3.	"Believe in It"	Benites; Garrett III; Austin; Butler	5:08
4.	"Who Stole It?"	Butler	5:10
5.	"Don't Be Shy"	Butler; Benites; Garrett III	4:38
6.	"Rhythm Is a Dancer"	Austin; Benites; Garrett III	5:32
7.	"Money"	Butler	5:12
8.	"See the Light"	Butler; Ford; Austin	5:45
9.	"Ex-Terminator"		5:24
10.	"Keep It Up"		4:05
11.	"Homeboyz"		6:37
12.	"Sample City"		1:08
Total length:			57:19

Second edition
No.	Title	Length
1.	"Madman's Return"	4:35
2.	"Colour of Love"	5:32
3.	"Believe in It"	5:08
4.	"Who Stole It?"	5:10
5.	"Don't Be Shy"	4:38
6.	"Rhythm Is a Dancer"	5:32
7.	"Money"	5:12
8.	"See the Light"	5:45
9.	"Rhythm Is a Dancer" (7" edit)	3:45
10.	"Ex-Terminator"	5:24
11.	"Keep It Up"	4:05
12.	"Homeboyz"	6:37
13.	"Sample City V2.01"	1:10

Third edition
No.	Title	Writer(s)	Length
1.	"Madman's Return"		4:35
2.	"Colour of Love"		5:32
3.	"Believe in It"		5:08
4.	"Who Stole It?"		5:10
5.	"Don't Be Shy"		4:38
6.	"Rhythm Is a Dancer"		5:32
7.	"Money"		5:12
8.	"See the Light"		5:45
9.	"Rhythm Is a Dancer" (7" edit)		3:45
10.	"Exterminate!"	Benites; Garrett III	5:24
11.	"Ex-Terminator"		5:24
12.	"Keep It Up"		4:05
13.	"Homeboyz"		6:37
14.	"Sample City V2.01"		1:10

== Personnel ==
- Benito Benites – keyboards, drum programming
- John "Virgo" Garrett III – keyboards, drum programming
- Durron Butler – vocals
- Thea Austin – vocals
- Niki Haris – vocals (on "Exterminate")
- Andy Plöcher – guitars, bass
- Daniel Iribarren – guitars, bass
- Bobby Sattler – woodwinds

== Charts ==
=== Weekly charts ===
Weekly chart performance for The Madman's Return
Chart (1992–1993)	Peak position
Australian Albums (ARIA)	70
Austrian Albums (Ö3 Austria)	3
Canada Top Albums/CDs (RPM)	16
Dutch Albums (Album Top 100)	9
Finnish Albums (Suomen virallinen lista)	28
French Albums (SNEP)	6
German Albums (Offizielle Top 100)	3
New Zealand Albums (RMNZ)	38
Norwegian Albums (VG-lista)	12
Swedish Albums (Sverigetopplistan)	21
Swiss Albums (Schweizer Hitparade)	7
UK Albums (Official Charts)	8
US Billboard 200	121

=== Year-end charts ===
Year-end chart performance for The Madman's Return
Chart (1992)	Position
Austrian Albums (Ö3 Austria)	8
Canada Top Albums/CDs (RPM)	81
Dutch Albums (Album Top 100)	30
German Albums (Offizielle Top 100)	13
Swiss Albums (Schweizer Hitparade)	32

== Certifications and sales ==
Region	Certification	Certified units/sales
Austria (IFPI Austria)	Gold	25,000^{*}
France (SNEP)	2× Gold	200,000^{*}
Germany (BVMI)	Gold	500,000
Netherlands (NVPI)	Gold	50,000^{^}
Switzerland (IFPI Switzerland)	Platinum	50,000^{^}
United Kingdom (BPI)	Gold	100,000^{^}
^{*} Sales figures based on certification alone.^{^} Shipments figures based on certification alone.
