= Exterminate! (song) =

1992 single by Snap!

Single by Snap! featuring Niki Haris

from the album The Madman's Return
- Released: 7 December 1992
- Genre: Eurodance; disco; trance
- Length: 4:21
- Label: Logic
- Songwriters: John "Virgo" Garrett III; Benito Benites; Niki Haris
- Producer: Snap!

Snap! singles chronology
"Rhythm Is a Dancer" (1992)	"Exterminate!" (1992)	"Do You See the Light (Looking For)" (1993)

Music video
- "Exterminate!" on YouTube

"Exterminate!" is a song by German Eurodance group Snap! featuring American singer Niki Haris, released in December 1992 by Logic Records as the third single from their second studio album, The Madman's Return (1992), and features vocals by the group's new front woman, Haris, who also is credited for co-writing it. Going for a more trance-like song than its predecessor, "Rhythm Is a Dancer", it is based on the track "Ex-Terminator" and was included in later editions of the album. Released first at the end of 1992, it was a hit in several countries, peaking at number one in Spain and number two in the United Kingdom, where it spent 15 weeks on the UK Singles Chart. The music video for "Exterminate!" was directed by Angel Gracia.

== Critical reception ==
Larry Flick from Billboard magazine wrote, "Former Madonna backing singer steps into the spotlight as the German act's new (at least for the moment) front woman. Electronic hip hop beats are doused with ambient sound effects, while Haris offers an appropriately ominous and forceful vocal. Not as radio-friendly as the previous 'Rhythm Is a Dancer', but a savvy club entry that should glide onto playlists." In his weekly UK chart commentary, James Masterton said, "Its chart success so far is somewhat of a surprise being, aside from the one vocal line, almost an instrumental and certainly with little of the quirky appeal of the earlier singles." Sharon O'Connell from Melody Maker felt it's "full of latent power but just sitting on the launch pad."

Pan-European magazine Music & Media wrote that it "might not be as accessible on first hearing, but it's actually a killer dance song which chokes you with its chorus with built-in snappy piano riff." A reviewer from Music Week stated, "The trance-like tune builds and builds from a five note riff, while new vocalist Niki Harris manages to fill in some soulful wailing as well as the Dalek's catchphrase. The song hasn't got the same killer pop chorus as 'Rhythm Is a Dancer', but its sheer simplicity will win the day." Barbara Ellen from NME commented, "After what seemed like an interminable long and shaky period post 'The Power', Snap seem to have rediscovered their dancing feet recently, first with 'Rhythm Is a Dancer' and now this upfront, arrestingly sterile disco diversion." Mark Sutherland from Smash Hits gave the song three out of five, noting that it didn't feature Turbo B.

== Chart performance ==
"Exterminate!" peaked at number one in Spain. The single entered the top five in Belgium, Denmark, Finland, Germany, Greece, Ireland, Italy, the Netherlands, Sweden, Switzerland, and the United Kingdom. In Greece, Ireland, Switzerland and the UK, the song peaked at number two. In the UK, the song peaked during its second week on the UK Singles Chart, on 10 January 1993, and stayed there for three weeks. In Germany, it peaked at number five and spent a total of 23 weeks within the top 100. "Exterminate!" also was a top-10 hit in Austria, Norway and Portugal. The single entered the Eurochart Hot 100 at number 70 on 9 January after charting in Belgium, Denmark, Finland, Germany and the Netherlands. It peaked at number two six weeks later, on 13 February, while on the European Dance Radio Chart, it reached number four in early March 1993.

Elsewhere, "Exterminate!" charted in North America, peaking at number two on Canada's RPM Dance chart and number 29 on the US Billboard Dance Club Play chart. In Africa, it peaked at number six in Zimbabwe, while in Oceania, the song reached numbers 25 and 50 in New Zealand and Australia, respectively. In West Asia, it became a top-10 hit in Israel, peaking at number four on 18 January 1993. It spent four weeks at that position and ten weeks in total within the top 30. In Germany, the single was awarded with a gold record after 250,000 units were shipped.

== Music video ==
The accompanying music video for "Exterminate!" was directed by Angel Gracia, who had previously directed the video for "Colour of Love". This was the first video that Durron Butler (Turbo B) does not appear. It received heavy rotation on MTV Europe in January 1993.

== Track listings ==
- 7-inch single
1. "Ex-terminator" (album version) – 5:21
2. "Exterminate!" (Endzeit 7-inch mix) – 4:13
- 12-inch single
1. "Exterminate!" (Endzeit 12-inch) – 6:45
2. "Exterminate!" (A.C.II 12-inch) – 7:44
- CD single
1. "Ex-terminator" (album version) – 5:21
2. "Exterminate!" (Endzeit 7-inch mix) – 4:13
- CD maxi
1. "Exterminate!" (Endzeit 7-inch) – 4:13
2. "Exterminate!" (A.C.II 12-inch) – 7:44
3. "Ex-terminator" (album version) – 5:21

== Charts ==
=== Weekly charts ===
Chart (1993)	Peak position
Australia (ARIA)	50
Austria (Ö3 Austria Top 40)	9
Belgium (Ultratop 50 Flanders)	3
Canada Dance/Urban (RPM)	2
Denmark (IFPI)	5
Europe (Eurochart Hot 100)	2
Europe (European Dance Radio)	4
Europe (European Hit Radio)	11
Finland (Suomen virallinen lista)	3
France (SNEP)	18
Germany (GfK)	3
Greece (Pop + Rock)	2
Iceland (Íslenski Listinn Topp 40)	21
Ireland (IRMA)	2
Israel (Israeli Singles Chart)	4
Italy (Musica e dischi)	3
Netherlands (Dutch Top 40)	4
Netherlands (Single Top 100)	5
New Zealand (Recorded Music NZ)	25
Norway (VG-lista)	9
Portugal (AFP)	10
Spain (AFYVE)	1
Sweden (Sverigetopplistan)	7
Switzerland (Schweizer Hitparade)	2
UK Singles (Official Charts)	2
UK Airplay (Music Week)	3
UK Dance (Music Week)	1
UK Club Chart (Music Week)	4
US Dance Club Play (Billboard)	29
US Maxi-Singles Sales (Billboard)	36
Zimbabwe (ZIMA)	6

=== Year-end charts ===
Chart (1993)	Position
Belgium (Ultratop 50 Flanders)	15
Canada Dance/Urban (RPM)	32
Europe (Eurochart Hot 100)	15
Germany (Media Control)	28
Netherlands (Dutch Top 40)	39
Netherlands (Single Top 100)	28
Sweden (Topplistan)	63
Switzerland (Schweizer Hitparade)	16
UK Singles (OCC)	38
UK Airplay (Music Week)	48
UK Club Chart (Music Week)	74

== Certifications ==
Region	Certification	Certified units/sales
Germany (BVMI)	Gold	250,000^{^}
^{^} Shipments figures based on certification alone.

== Release history ==
Region	Date	Format(s)	Label(s)	Ref.
Europe	7 December 1992	7-inch vinyl; CD	Logic	
Australia	18 January 1993	12-inch vinyl; CD; cassette	Logic	
Japan	24 February 1993	Mini-CD single	Logic	
