= The Witness Protection Programme =

American retro disco indie band

The Witness Protection Programme is an American retro disco indie band featuring Martin Clancy.

The band has enjoyed considerable chart success reaching the Top 40 in the Billboard Dance Charts with its hit "Flatfoot" and the Top 20 hit "You Can't Stop the Rain".

The band has attracted significant music industry interest with high-profile DJs offering to remix the Witness Protection Programme's songs. Remixes to date have been provided by DJ Meme, Stonebridge, Richard Morel, Chris Cox, Yvannis, Timmy Loop, Jc, EmJae and Louie Balo.

The Witness Protection Programme was one of the headline acts featured at Filter magazine's Culture Collide Festival as well as the Seaport Music Festival.
