= Do Anything (song) =

1991 single by Natural Selection

Single by Natural Selection

from the album Natural Selection
- B-side: "Do Anything" (raw mix)
- Released: October 21, 1991 (Australia)
- Genre: New jack swing; funk-pop
- Length: 3:55 (radio edit)
- Label: EastWest America
- Songwriters: Elliot Erickson; Frederick Thomas; Ingrid Chavez
- Producers: Elliot Erickson; Frederick Thomas; Brian Malouf (add.)

Natural Selection singles chronology
"Do Anything" (1991)	"Hearts Don't Think (They Feel)!" (1991)

Audio
- "Do Anything" on YouTube

"Do Anything" is the debut single of American pop group Natural Selection. The song was written by group members Elliot Erickson and Frederick Thomas, who also produced the track, and the rap was written and performed by Ingrid Chavez. American actress and singer Niki Haris provides the song's spoken lyrics. A new jack swing and funk-pop song, it is the opening track on Natural Selection's self-titled, only studio album (1991). Released as a single in 1991, "Do Anything" became a hit in the United States, where it reached number two on the Billboard Hot 100 chart. Worldwide, it became a top-10 hit in Australia, Canada, and New Zealand.

== Critical reception ==
Rolling Stone magazine featured the song on their list of "18 Awesome Prince Rip-Offs", comparing Frederick Thomas's vocals on the song to those of fellow American musician Prince. Music & Media magazine also compared the song to Prince's work, calling its chorus "snappy" and its melody "asserted", while Tom Breihan of Stereogum referred to the track as "K-Mart-brand Prince". Jeff Giles of pop culture website Popdose wrote that the song is "deeply, deeply silly," commenting on its "horrible" lyrics, "dated" production, and "painfully bad" rap, but he noted that the song is difficult to hate overall. He went on to say that if Natural Selection had released this song and nothing else, its popularity would have persisted more, and he also predicted that if American rock band Fall Out Boy covered the song, it would become a summer hit. AllMusic reviewer Alex Henderson called the track "likeable" and appreciated that it was original compared to other urban contemporary songs released during the early 1990s.

== Chart performance ==
"Do Anything" debuted on the US Billboard Hot 100 at number 58, becoming the Hot Shot Debut of August 10, 1991. Ten issues later, the song reached its peak of number two. It spent its final week on the Hot 100 at number 27 on December 28, 1991, spending a total of 21 weeks on the listing. It was the United States' 32nd-most-successful single of 1991. On Canada's RPM 100 Hit Tracks chart, after debuting at number 92 on October 5, 1991, the song rose up the listing until reaching number 24 on November 23. It also peaked at number six on the country's The Record singles chart. "Do Anything" was not as successful in Europe, reaching number 48 on the Dutch Single Top 100 and number 69 on the UK Singles Chart, but in Sweden, it debuted and peaked at number 21 in November 1991. The single became a top-10 hit in both Australia and New Zealand, reaching number 10 in the former nation and number nine in the latter.

== Track listings ==
- US 12-inch single

A1. "Do Anything" (Justin Strauss remix) – 6:00
A2. "Do Anything" (Just Dubbin dub) – 4:30
B1. "Do Anything" (Just Right mix) – 4:35
B2. "Do Anything" (Just Right dub) – 4:50
B3. "Do Anything" (radio edit) – 3:55

- US cassette single and European 7-inch single
1. "Do Anything" (single mix) – 3:55
2. "Do Anything" (raw mix) – 4:11
- UK and European 12-inch single

A1. "Do Anything" (Justin Strauss remix) – 6:00
A2. "Do Anything" (Just Dubbin dub) – 4:30
B1. "Do Anything" (Just Right mix) – 4:35
B2. "Do Anything" (Just Right dub) – 4:50

== Personnel ==
Personnel are taken from the US cassette single liner notes and cassette notes.

- Elliot Erickson – keyboards, drum programming, writer, producer, mixer, engineer
- Frederick Thomas – lead and background vocals, writer, producer
- Niki Haris – spoken vocals
- Ingrid Chavez – rap writer
- Brian Malouf – additional production and mixing

== Charts ==
=== Weekly charts ===
Chart (1991–1992)	Peak position
Australia (ARIA)	10
Canada Retail Singles (The Record)	6
Canada Top Singles (RPM)	24
Europe (European Hit Radio)	40
Netherlands (Dutch Top 40 Tipparade)	16
Netherlands (Single Top 100)	48
New Zealand (Recorded Music NZ)	9
Sweden (Sverigetopplistan)	21
UK Singles (Official Charts)	69
US Billboard Hot 100	2
US Cash Box Top 100	2

=== Year-end charts ===
Chart (1991)	Position
Australia (ARIA)	67
US Billboard Hot 100	32
US Cash Box Top 100	35

== Certifications ==
Region	Certification	Certified units/sales
Australia (ARIA)	Gold	35,000^{^}
^{^} Shipments figures based on certification alone.

== Release history ==
Region	Date	Format(s)	Label(s)	Ref.
United States	1991	—N/a	EastWest America	
Australia	October 21, 1991	Cassette	EastWest America	
Australia	November 4, 1991	CD	EastWest America	
Australia	November 25, 1991	12-inch vinyl	EastWest America	
Japan	November 28, 1991	Mini-CD	EastWest America	
