= Giulietta (singer) =

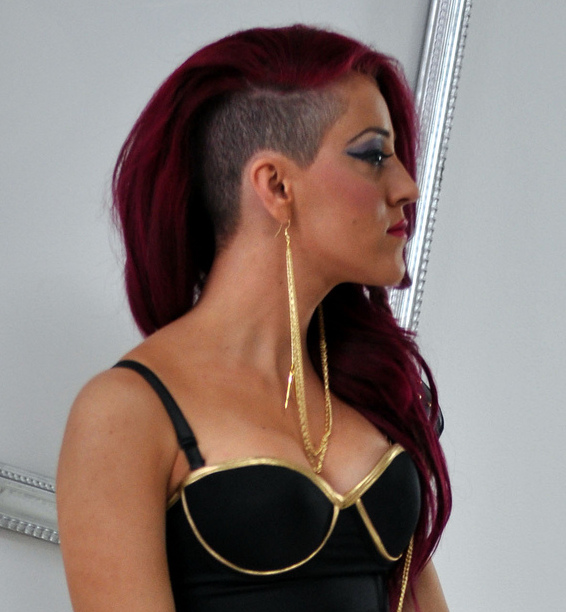
- Giulietta in 2011.

Background information
- Born: Giulia Russo; 12 November 1992 (age 33)
- Origin: Melbourne, Australia
- Genres: Pop, dance, R&B, hip-hop
- Occupations: Singer, songwriter, dancer, rapper, model
- Instruments: Vocals, piano
- Years active: 2008–present
- Labels: Giulietta R Enterprises, Interscope, Simmy Music
- Website: officialgiulietta.com

Giulia Russo (born 12 November 1992), known mononymously as Giulietta, is an Australian pop singer, songwriter, dancer, rapper and model of Italian descent. She released her first collaborative single "Dirty House Music" with DJ Marcus Knight in 2008 before releasing her debut studio album, Ascension, in 2010. Her debut single "Vertigo" peaked at No. 16 on the Billboard Hot Dance Club Play charts, effectively rendering her the first Australian unsigned female to make an impact on the US chart and making her a number-one Breakthrough Artist. Two years later, she released her second studio album, entitled 911: Code Pink.

== Early life ==
Giulietta was born in the Melbourne suburb of Rowville, Australia, to parents Fabrice and Teresa. She has a younger brother, Antonio. Giulietta began singing at the age of four, regularly performing in talent shows and drawing inspiration from musicians such as Mariah Carey, Whitney Houston and Celine Dion. At the age of nine she trained at NIDA in Sydney, and later attended a performing arts high school.

== Career ==
In 2007, Giulietta met with DJ Marcus Knight and contributed vocals to his tracks "Give It Up" and "Dirty House Music". When the latter was released to nightclubs and other music outlets, it peaked at number four on the Beatport charts and charted twice on the ARIA Dance Chart, peaking within the top twenty. Giulietta also contributed vocals to tracks by Jacob D ("Take Your Mind There") and Dirty Rascals ("Venus").

In January 2009, producer David Kershenbaum met with Giulietta after hearing "Dirty House Music". She agreed to have him produce her debut album, which became Ascension. Though it was rumoured that Giulietta's family were paying up to A$40,000 a session with Kershenbaum, in an interview with the Herald Sun Teresa Russo stated, "I don't like to talk figures. I won't today, I won't in future."

In November 2009, Giulietta attended the Los Angeles Music Awards in Hollywood, California, where she won awards for International Pop Artist of the Year, Producer's Choice and the Hollywood Walk of Fame Award. She also performed a song called "Here We Go Again", which was originally slated to be the lead single off Ascension.

On 17 May 2010, Giulietta released her debut album Ascension on her own label, Giulietta R. Enterprises, with distribution by Interscope Records. As well as featuring production from Kershenbaum the album also had writing by Ellis Miah and mixing by Rob Orton and Chris Cox. The album spawned the single "Vertigo", which reached No. 16 on the US Billboard Hot Dance Club Play Chart. The song was also remixed by the likes of Dave Aude. To promote the album, Giulietta performed at many venues including The Highlands nightclub in Hollywood and attended record releases for artists such as Lil' Jon. On her time promoting the album in the US, Giulietta stated, "It's a lot busier over there; I was doing 13 hours a day and rehearsing and doing things like Bikram yoga." Giulietta also performed at R&B festivals such as Summerbeatz in Melbourne.

In February 2011, Giulietta began writing for her second album, which eventuated into 911: Code Pink. She enlisted Australian producer Simmy for the album's production, and the majority of the album was recorded in the USA. Though it was originally scheduled to be released on 19 November 2011, it was delayed several months with Giulietta stating that some of the instrumentals needed re-recording. After releasing the singles "Pixelated", "VooDoo" and "Pretty in Pink", the album was released in its entirety for free via SoundCloud and ClubTapes on 12 July 2012. The album contained guest appearances by Tay Dizm of Nappy Boy, Raz B of B2K, Mick Stillz, Dall. Diamond, Billionaire, Envy and Mr. Focus.

In August 2012 Giulietta stated she would embark on her first tour of China later in the year.

== Influences ==
Giulietta regards the likes of Whitney Houston, Mariah Carey, Celine Dion, Lady Gaga, Pharrell, Gwen Stefani, Rihanna, The-Dream and Nicki Minaj as her influences.

== Discography ==
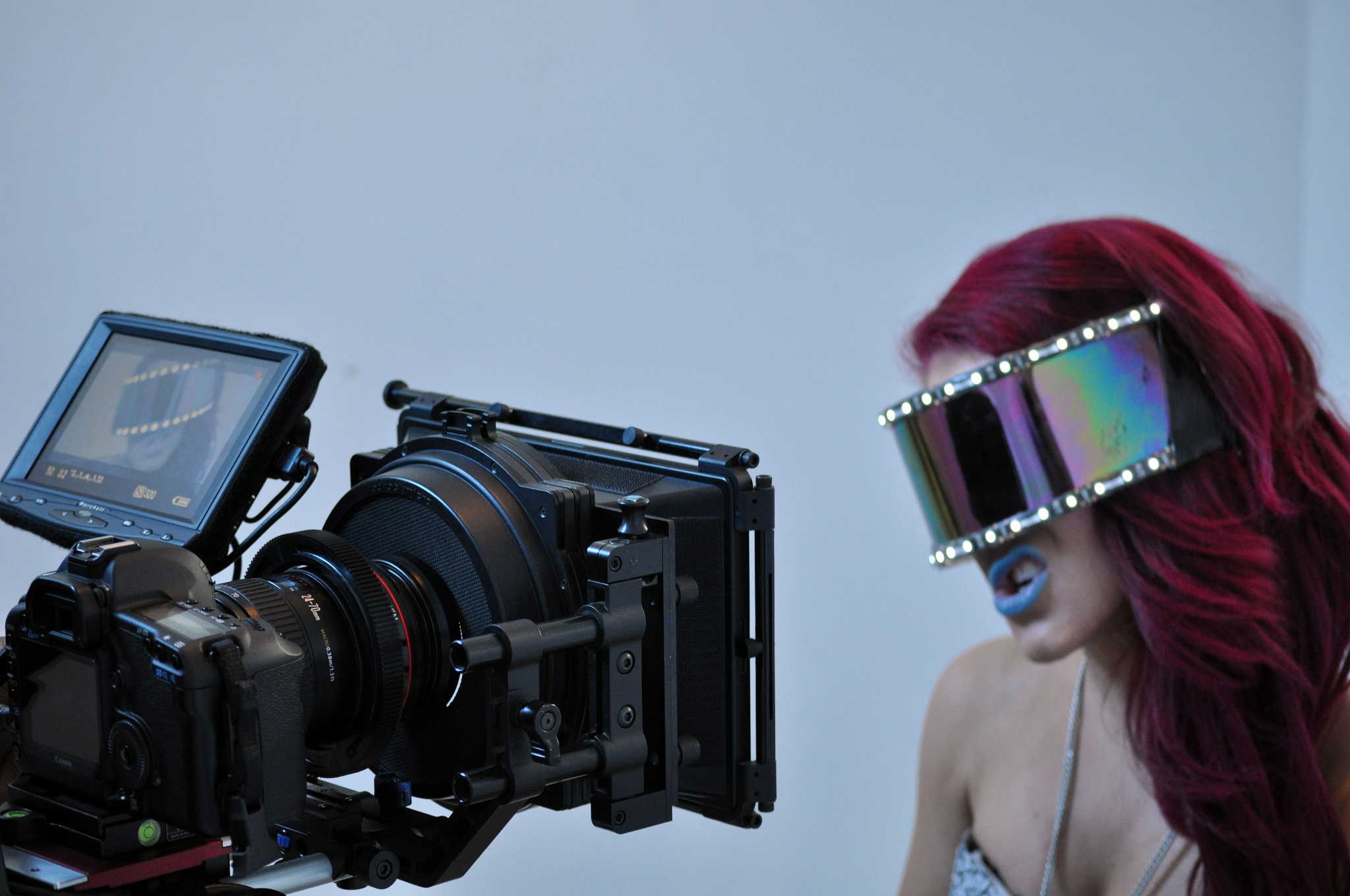
Giulietta filming the music video for "Pixelated".

Albums

- Ascension (2010)
- 911: Code Pink (2012)
- XXI (2015)
- Bandit (2016)

Singles

- "Vertigo" (2010)
- "Pixelated" (2011)
- "When December Comes" (2011)
- "VooDoo" (2012)
- "Pretty in Pink" (2012)
- "2am" (2012)
- "Nowhere"(feat. Tay Dizm) (2013)
- "Uptown" (2014)
- Över"
- "Real 1" (2015)
- "Soldier" (2015)
- "Bandit" (2016)
- "Owh!" (2016)

As a feature artist

- "Draft Day" (E.Cov, 2011)
- "Takin' Flight (Peter Pan)" (Christylez, 2011)
