= In Tua Nua =

Irish rock band

- Origin: County Dublin, Ireland
- Genres: Rock, folk rock, alternative rock
- Years active: 1982–1990, 2004–present
- Labels: Mother, Island, Virgin
- Past members: Leslie Dowdall; Jack Dublin; Vinnie Kilduff; Ivan O'Shea; Martin Clancy; Paul Byrne; Steve Wickham; Aingeala de Burca; Brian O'Briain; Lovely Previn; Matt Spalding

In Tua Nua were an Irish rock band in the 1980s. Members throughout this period were singer Leslie Dowdall, guitarist Martin Clancy, bassist Jack Dublin, and drummer Paul Byrne, of whom all but Clancy have performed in the band's occasional reunions since the 2000s.

== Biography ==
The group was formed by Leslie Dowdall, Jack Dublin, Vinnie Kilduff, Ivan O'Shea, Martin Clancy, Paul Byrne and Steve Wickham in the early 1980s. The band's name was taken from Gouverneur Morris's 1929 short story "Iphigenia in Tua Nua", set on a fictional Tahitian island named Tua Nua. Although the group's early focus was a glam rock or new wave style strongly influenced by Roxy Music, it gradually combined this aspiration with modern-styled folk and traditional Irish music in the form of uilleann pipes and acoustic guitars, laced together with vocals and electronic violin.

In 1984, the band were the first to sign to U2's Mother label and released their first single "Coming Thru". Shortly afterwards Island Records signed the band. A number of singles were released and a debut album recorded. The first Island single was the critically acclaimed "Take My Hand", co-written by a young Sinéad O'Connor. This was followed by a second single, a cover of Jefferson Airplane's hit "Somebody to Love".

In 1985, Steve Wickham left to join forces with the Waterboys and Island dropped the band. The album recorded for Island remains unreleased. A compilation album of singles and b-sides was released in Italy under the title Somebody to Love.

Vinnie Kilduff also departed from the band around this time. The remaining members recruited replacements, Aingeala de Burca on violin and Brian O'Briain on uilleann pipes.

On 17 May 1986, the new look In Tua Nua played the Self Aid concert. Newly signed to Virgin Records the band released "Seven into the Sea", one of their most popular recordings. An album Vaudeville was released in early 1987.

After touring to promote the album the band reconvened to record a follow-up. Shortly after the recording was completed both de Burca and O'Shea decided to leave. Two new members joined, Alicia 'Lovely' Previn on violin and Matt Spalding on bass, and The Long Acre was released in 1988. It spawned two radio hits "All I Wanted" and "Don't Fear Me Now". "All I Wanted" peaked at No. 69 in the UK Singles Chart in May 1988. A third single from the album, "Wheel of Evil", was also released.

The band went to the US to record a third album for Virgin. After the recording was finished the band split, and Virgin did not immediately release the finished product. Both Vaudeville and The Long Acre were made available on iTunes in 2006, and the unreleased third album called When Night Came Down on Sunset was eventually released through iTunes in September 2007.

Although officially disbanded in 1990, some original members reformed in 2004 to occasionally play live together again. In 2010 M.P. & Records, Italy released Vaudeville and The Long Acre re-mastered with bonus tracks on CD (five bonus tracks on "Vaudeville" and three bonus tracks on "The Long Acre").

Leslie Dowdall continues to perform, be it solo or guesting with other Irish and international singers. She released two well-received solo albums in the 1990s; No Guilt, No Guile and Out There.

Paul Byrne and Jack Dublin still play together as the rhythm section in Rocky de Valera and The Gravediggers. Byrne manages the Irish band Von Shakes, while Dublin is the main songwriter for the Dublin band Audiokiss. In late 2010, they also played several shows as part of a band backing Pogues frontman, Shane MacGowan.

== Discography ==
=== Albums ===
- Vaudeville (1987; Virgin)
- The Long Acre (1988; Virgin)
- When Night Came Down On Sunset (2007; self-released)

=== Singles ===
Date	Single	Irish Charts	Dutch Charts	UK
January 1985	"Take My Hand"	19		
June 1986	"Seven into The Sea"	9	24	
March 1987	"Heaven Can Wait"	16		
November 1987	"Some Things Never Change"	22		
April 1988	"All I Wanted"	17		69
November 1988	"Wheel Of Evil"			90
