= Natural Selection (group) =

American pop group

Background information
- Origin: Minneapolis, Minnesota
- Genres: Pop, R&B
- Years active: 1989–2011
- Labels: EastWest; SBK
- Past members: Frederick Thomas; John Swan; Shaun Ware; Keith Brown; Daniel Knight; Steve Bryant Kallsen; Elliot Erickson; Will Palaia

Natural Selection was an American pop group, best known for their 1991 hit "Do Anything", which reached number two on the Billboard Hot 100. It also peaked at number ten on the Australian ARIA Charts in 1991.

== History ==
"Do Anything" was written and recorded on a 4-track recorder in Minnesota. The song sat unfinished until Erickson began working on it again in 1989. The rap was originally recorded by Ingrid Chavez, a friend of the duo who improvised the rap in the studio. In 1990, the version with Chavez doing the raps was a local hit on Minnesota's WLOL-FM, where Erickson worked as a remix engineer. Once Natural Selection was signed to a recording contract, Chavez's raps were re-recorded by Niki Haris, because Chavez was by then under contract with Paisley Park Records.

Their self-titled debut (and lone) album was released in November 1991. Erickson and Thomas produced the album themselves.

== Discography ==
=== Albums ===
List of albums, with selected chart positions
| Title | Album details | Peak chart positions |
| Title | Album details | AUS |
|---|---|---|
| Natural Selection | Released: 1991; Format: CD, CS, LP; Label: EastWest Records | 120 |

=== Singles ===
List of singles, with selected chart positions
| Title | Year | Peak chart positions | | | | | Certification | Album |
| Title | Year | US | US CB | AUS | NZ | UK | Certification | Album |
|---|---|---|---|---|---|---|---|---|
| "Do Anything" | 1991 | 2 | 2 | 10 | 9 | 69 | ARIA: Gold | Natural Selection |
| "Hearts Don't Think (They Feel)!" | 1991 | 28 | 15 | 106 | 47 | — | | Natural Selection |
