= Jack Lukeman =

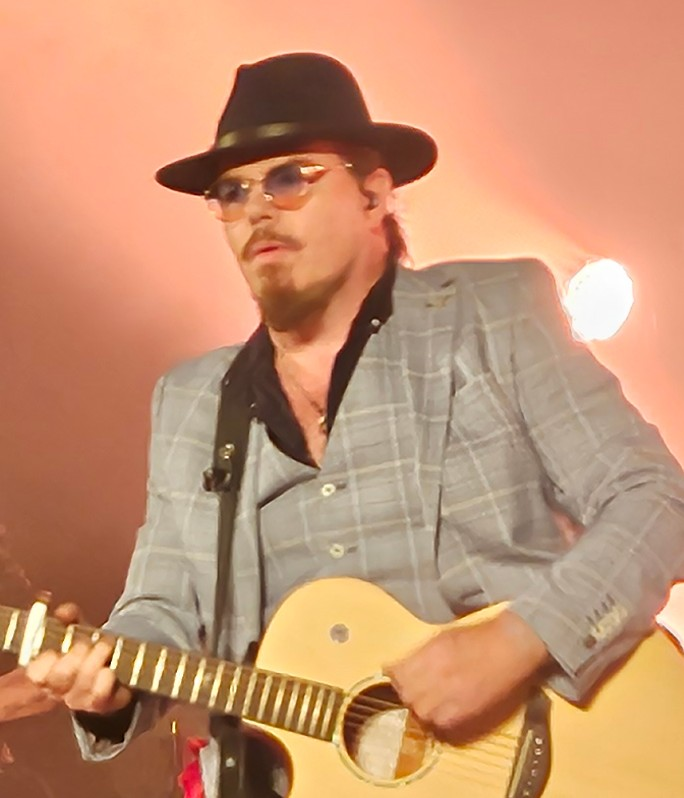
- Jack Lukeman in 2024

Background information
- Origin: Athy, County Kildare, Ireland
- Genres: Rock, alternative rock
- Years active: 1997–present
- Website: www.jacklukeman.com

Jack Lukeman (born Seán Loughman 11 February 1973), usually simply known as Jack L, is an Irish songwriter, musician, record producer, vocal artist and broadcaster.

== Early life ==
Lukeman was born as Seán Loughman in St Vincent's Hospital, Athy; son of Seán Loughman, who was a mechanic, and his wife, Rose. Lukeman grew up in Bennetsbridge, near Athy, County Kildare.

Lukeman attended a youth club in Athy known as Aontas Ogra at the age of 12 years old, where he was involved in artistic ventures as well as playing music there. He left school at 15. After spending a short period in the family business, he began playing music full-time at 18 cutting his teeth on the Bohemian busking scene around Europe in the early 90s. Playing across Holland, Belgium and Germany sometimes playing with art rock band Serious Women with David Constantine and Martin Clancy whom he has continued to collaborate with over the years. His first vocal performance can be heard on Serious Women's album 38SCR, called after the art-house in which they all lived and where the album was made.

== Career ==
Lukeman first came to prominence in the summer of 1995 when he and The Black Romantics took up a residency at The Da Club (Dublin Arts Club) in Dublin selling out night after night. The band's set included interpretations of Jacques Brel along with several of Jack's own compositions. The band recorded the album Wax in 1995 before splitting in 1997.

Lukeman established himself as a solo artist and songwriter with his live work and his breakthrough 1999 multi-platinum selling album Metropolis Blue, gaining record deals and touring extensively in the US and Europe, and becoming a regular fixture on U.S college radio with the singles "Rooftop Lullabye", "Georgie Boy" and "Ode to Ed Wood".

John Walshe of Hot Press magazine stated, "Lukeman's voice is powerful and fluid. His range too is impressive, from the deep baritone resonance of 'When The Moon Is High' to the aching falsetto of the magnificent 'Rooftop Lullaby' ... this is a timeless collection of fine songs, beautifully delivered, from an artist as unique as Ireland has ever produced". He released three singles from this album: Georgie Boy, Ode to Ed Wood and Rooftop Lullaby.

Metropolis Blue was followed up with 2001's album Universe. The album was recorded in L.A, Jamaica and Dublin with Greg Wells producing the single "So Far Gone".

The album was supported in 2002 with a run of theatre shows with theatre director Raymond Keane from Barabbas Theatre Company. It was called The Little Universe and combined black box and light theatre with music and earned five star reviews in The Guardian.

2003 saw Lukeman play a 14-week residency of shows in Spirit in Dublin producing the DVD Chez Jack L.

2005 saw the release of studio album written and produced by Lukeman, Broken Songs, which included the radio hit singles "Open Your Borders", "You Can't Get Bitter", "Chocolate Eyes" and "Authentic Fake". Lukeman followed up the success of Broken Songs in 2006 with a live DVD MOMENTO, recorded at the Olympia Theatre.

In 2008, Lukeman released Burn On, an album of Randy Newman songs, which had a performance with the Brooklyn Philharmonic Orchestra in NYC's South Street Seaport.

In 2010, Lukeman collaborated with writer Anna McPartlin on her new book So What if I'm Broken, in which each chapter was inspired by and named after one of Lukeman's songs. The narrative consisted of the relationship between Jack L fans.

Lukeman was awarded the Edinburgh Spotlight Best Music Award at the World biggest and oldest festival, the Edinburgh Fringe Festival 2010 for his show "A Month of Mondays".

In May 2011, Lukeman presented a series of radio shows with fellow Irish singer Julie Feeney on Lyric FM called "High Fidelity" tracing the history of recorded song from Edison to the IPOD.

In 2013, Lukeman Released the Great Wall of China EP, a song cycle and travelogue. Kicking off The Great Wall of China Tour saw him support Jools Holland's UK tour.

In 2016, Lukeman performed at RTÉ's Centenary Concert to mark the 100 year anniversary of Ireland's 1916 Rising.

During his musical career Lukeman has worked with composer Brian Byrne, the Nelson Riddle Orchestra, the Brooklyn Philharmonic and producers Greg Wells, Craig Armstrong and Martin Clancy.

Lukeman has also performed over the years supporting or alongside U2, Ronnie Wood, Robert Plant and Jimmy Page, John Lee Hooker, Elvis Costello, Jools Holland, and Marianne Faithfull, and has appeared at venues such as Olympia Paris, Royal Albert Hall in London, and The Lincoln Center in NYC.

== Personal life ==
Lukeman and his partner, Rebecca Mack, have one son, Seán, born in 2024.

== Discography ==
=== Albums ===
- Wax (1995, with The Black Romantics)
- Acoustico (1997, limited release)
- Metropolis Blue (1999)
- Universe (2001)
- Songs from the Little Universe Show (2002)
- The Amsterdam Album (2005)
- Broken Songs (2006)
- Burn On (2008)
- The Story So Far – The Essential Collection (2009)
- The 27 Club (2012)
- The Great Wall of China EP (2013)
- Northern Lights – Songs for the Winter Solstice (2014)
- The King of Soho (2016)
- Magic Days (2017)
- Streamed: Best of the Lockdown Sessions Vol. 1 (2020)
- Echo On (2022) – No. 22 Ireland

=== Guest appearances ===
- Echoes: Ancient & Modern by Trevor Horn (2023)
