= Pusaka (DJ collaboration) =

American musical group

Pusaka is a collaboration of dance music producers and DJs Chris Cox of Thunderpuss and DJ Irene. In 2001, their song "You're the Worst Thing for Me", featuring vocals by Thea Austin, hit number one on the Billboard Dance Club Songs chart.

== See also ==
- List of number-one dance hits (United States)
- List of artists who reached number one on the US Dance chart
