= DJ Irene =

- Born: Irene Mejia Gutiérrez; July 19, 1962 (age 63); Downey, California, U.S.
- Origin: Los Angeles, California
- Genres: Electronic, progressive dance, hard house, trance, dubstep
- Occupation(s): Producer, DJ
- Instrument(s): Turntables, sampler
- Years active: 1984–present
- Labels: Moist Music; Ultra Records
- Member of: Pusaka
- Website: www.divadjirene.com

DJ Irene (born Irene Mejia Gutiérrez) is an American electronic dance music DJ and producer.

== Discography ==
=== Albums ===
- Hard House Diva (1998)
- Global House Diva (2001)
- Audio Underground (2002)
- Global House Diva 2 (2002)
- Phonosynthesis (2002)
- Fearless (2003)
- Rockstar (2004)
- Live (2005)
- Ultra.Trance 06 (2006)
- Rockstar Royalty (2008)
- Dissonance (2009)

=== Singles ===
- "Weatha Beatin Hoochie Bitch" feat. Stacey Hollywood (1998)
