= Colour of Love (Snap! song) =

1991 single by Snap!

Single by Snap!

from the album The Madman's Return
- Released: 9 December 1991
- Genre: Eurodance; downtempo
- Length: 3:57
- Label: Arista; Logic
- Songwriters: John "Virgo" Garrett III; Durron Butler; Penny Ford; Thea Austin; Benito Benites
- Producers: Benito Benitez; John "Virgo" Garrett III

Snap! singles chronology
"Megamix" (1991)	"Colour of Love" (1991)	"Rhythm Is a Dancer" (1992)

Music video
- "Colour of Love" on YouTube

"Colour of Love" is a song by German Eurodance group Snap!, released in December 1991 by Arista and Logic Records as the first single from their second studio album, The Madman's Return (1992). It features vocals by American singer-songwriter Thea Austin and rap by Turbo B, which both co-wrote the lyrics with the producers. The song received positive reviews from music critics, many of them naming it a standout of the album. Quite successful on the charts in Europe, it became a top-10 hit in at least 11 countries, as well as on the Eurochart Hot 100, where it peaked at number eight in February 1992. The accompanying music video was filmed in Death Valley, California.

== Critical reception ==
AllMusic named "Colour of Love" a "standout" track from The Madman's Return. J.D. Considine from The Baltimore Sun opined that it's the only track "that comes even close to the group's early vigor". Ken Capobianco from The Boston Globe complimented Thea Austin's "colorful" voice, describing the song as "a meek but graceful look at interracial love." Clark and DeVaney from Cashbox also named it a "standout" cut from the album, remarking that the sounds that are offered on this album have a little more depth and variety compared to their last release. Dave Jennings from Melody Maker felt the tension between Turbo B's "gruff rumbling" and "abandoned, soulful female wailing" by Austin "is still highly effective." Another Melody Maker editor, Push, described it as "dreamy" and named it the "highlight" of the LP.

Machgiel Bakker from Music & Media wrote that it "pairs a bass-heavy and soothing Massive-type of production to rapper Turbo's firm vocals. The soulful female vocals provided by Thea Austin makes the song an easy add-on for EHR formats." Newcastle Evening Chronicle noted that a "slow menacing opening gives way to a mix of soul and Turbo B's rap". The newspaper also noted that the "macho" rap contrasts with the new singer's "catchy" soul vocal. Rozalla Miller reviewed the song for Smash Hits, commenting, "I like the beat a lot, very groovy. Snap are really good. I've liked lots of their records up until now, and this one sounds like one of the best."

== Chart performance ==
"Colour of Love" was quite successful on the charts in Europe, reaching the top 5 in Austria (4), Italy (3), Portugal (3), Spain (5) and Switzerland (4), and the top 10 in Denmark (8), Germany (9), Greece (8), the Netherlands (6), Norway (6) and Sweden (6). In Belgium, it peaked within the top 20, as number 14 in both Flanders and Wallonia. In the UK, the single was less successful, reaching number 54. On Music Week's dance singles chart, it climbed to number 23. On both the Eurochart Hot 100 and the European Dance Radio Chart, "Colour of Love" peaked at number eight in February 1992. Outside Europe, it charted in both Australia and New Zealand, where it peaked at numbers 66 and 36, respectively. In West Asia, it became a top-30 hit in Israel, peaking at number 30 on 7 January 1992.

== Music video ==
A music video was produced to promote the single, directed by Angel Gracia and filmed in Death Valley, California. The video begins with Turbo B and two others riding on motorcycles through a desert landscape on a bright day. Thea Austin sings standing on a rocky mantle with a cape while dancers perform actobats and dance on rocks. Some of them wear masks and has body paint. As the video ends, it has become night in the desert, while Austin still performs.

== Track listings ==
- 7-inch single (Logic 114 678)
1. "Colour of Love" (Massive 7"/Radio Version) – 3:57
2. "Colour of Love" (Smoove 7") – 3:59
- CD maxi (Logic 664 678)
1. "Colour of Love" (Massive 7") – 3:57
2. "Colour of Love" (Massive Version) – 5:30
3. "Colour of Love" (String Mix) – 5:05
4. "Colour of Love" (Smoove Version) – 5:29

== Charts ==
=== Weekly charts ===
Chart (1991–1992)	Peak position
Australia (ARIA)	66
Austria (Ö3 Austria Top 40)	4
Belgium (Ultratop 50 Flanders)	14
Denmark (IFPI)	8
Europe (Eurochart Hot 100)	8
Europe (European Dance Radio)	8
Finland (Suomen virallinen lista)	20
Germany (GfK)	9
Greece (IFPI)	8
Israel (Israeli Singles Chart)	30
Italy (Musica e dischi)	3
Netherlands (Dutch Top 40)	7
Netherlands (Single Top 100)	6
New Zealand (Recorded Music NZ)	36
Norway (VG-lista)	6
Portugal (AFP)	3
Spain (AFYVE)	5
Sweden (Sverigetopplistan)	6
Switzerland (Schweizer Hitparade)	4
UK Singles (Official Charts)	54
UK Club Chart (Music Week)	40
UK Dance (Music Week)	23

=== Year-end charts ===
Chart (1992)	Position
Austria (Ö3 Austria Top 40)	29
Germany (Media Control)	45
Netherlands (Dutch Top 40)	54
Netherlands (Single Top 100)	65
Sweden (Topplistan)	55
Switzerland (Schweizer Hitparade)	39

== Release history ==
Region	Date	Format(s)	Label(s)	Ref.
United Kingdom	9 December 1991	7-inch vinyl; 12-inch vinyl; CD; cassette	Arista; Logic	
Australia	20 January 1992	12-inch vinyl; CD; cassette	Sony BMG	
Japan	21 February 1992	Mini-CD	Ariola; Logic	
Australia	16 March 1992	12-inch remix vinyl	Sony BMG	
