= Miguelito (footballer, born December 1990) =

Spanish footballer

Personal information
- Full name: Miguel Muñiz Fernández
- Date of birth: 1 December 1990 (age 35)
- Place of birth: Huelva, Spain
- Height: 1.77 m (5 ft 9 1/2 in)
- Position: Attacking midfielder

Team information
- Current team: Atlético Porcuna

Youth career
- Recreativo

Senior career*
Years	Team	Apps	(Gls)
2009–2013	Recreativo B	56	(12)
2010–2014	Recreativo	3	(0)
2013–2014	→ Sanluqueño (loan)	13	(0)
2014	→ Écija (loan)	9	(1)
2014–2015	Mancha Real	25	(3)
2015–2017	Recreativo	54	(4)
2017–2018	Marbella	4	(0)
2018	Lorca Deportiva	13	(0)
2018–2020	San Roque	48	(3)
2020–	Atlético Porcuna	5	(0)
- * Club domestic league appearances and goals as of 29 November 2020

Miguel Muñiz Fernández (born 1 December 1990), commonly known as Miguelito, is a Spanish professional footballer who plays for Atlético Porcuna CF as an attacking midfielder.

== Club career ==
Born in Huelva, Miguelito spent his first three seasons as a senior with Recreativo de Huelva's reserves. On 6 January 2010 he made his debut with the Andalusians' first team, against Atlético Madrid in the round of 16 of the Copa del Rey.

Miguelito played his first match in Segunda División on 2 January 2011, appearing as a late substitute in a 0–1 home loss to SD Huesca. On 25 July 2013, he was loaned to Segunda División B club Atlético Sanluqueño CF.
