= Egma (band) =

Dutch Eurodance project

- Origin: Netherlands
- Genres: Eurodance
- Years active: 1991–1995
- Past members: Ege van Kruysdijk; Marcel Theunissen; Ilse Geels; Margo Smulders; Henk van de Wiel †; Natasja Muskens; Michael Robby

Egma was a Dutch Eurodance project, produced by Ege van Kruysdijk and Marcel Theunissen, primarily active between 1991 and 1995. The name of the project came from first two letters of producers names "Eg" and "Ma".

== History ==
The project went through a couple of vocalists during the years. Starting with "Never Gonna Loose Your Love" performed by Ilse Geels (former dancer) and Henk Van de Wiel (former model) the project was joined by another female (former model), named Margo Smulders (a.k.a. Keira Green) and Natasja Muskens that became the lead female singer (former dancer). By the time of the single "Make My Day" Henk had left the project and a dancer/rapper Michael Robby joined instead (he also performed in ZOO Inc.).

Ege and Marcel also produced others projects like Usha, No Sense, Revolution Team, Wonderland, Sound Victory, Camen, The company, BWX, Central Seven.

One video clip was shot for the single named "Love Is", also there was live performances from the French television show named "Dance Machine 3" and "Dance Machine 6" and French and Belgian Shows.

On March 8, 2002, Henk van de Wiel was murdered in Paris during a robbery.

== Discography ==
=== Singles ===
Year	Single	Peak chart positions		
Year	Single	FRA	NED	ISR
1991	"Let the Bass Kick"	—	74	—
1992	"Don't Have to Be Jesus"	—	—	—
1993	"Never Gonna Loose Your Love"	—	49	—
1994	"Love Is"	42	—	6
1995	"Make My Day"	—	—	—
1995	"Tell It to My Heart"	—	—	—
"—" denotes releases that did not chart
