= Leslie Dowdall =

Irish singer-songwriter

Leslie Dowdall (born in 1961) is an Irish singer and songwriter from Howth, County Dublin. She was lead singer in trad/rock group In Tua Nua in the 1980s and released several solo albums in the late 1990s.

Leslie Dowdall was born in Dublin and grew up in Monkstown and Rathvilly, County Carlow. She was 23 when she joined 'In Tua Nua'. She had previously been recorded by guitarist/engineer Ivan O’Shea with her band ‘The Assembly’.

With Leslie Dowdall as lead singer, In Tua Nua members were celebrating their 40th anniversary as a band on a tour in 2023.
