= Bas Noir =

American female vocal house music group

- Origin: United States
- Genre: Pop music
- Labels: 10 Records; Nu Groove; Atlantic Records
- Past members: Morie Bivens, Mary Ridley

Bas Noir was an American female vocal house music group from Philadelphia, Pennsylvania. The duo was composed of Morie Bivens and Mary Ridley. Its only UK chart success was called "My Love is Magic," which was released on the 10 Records label. It entered the UK singles chart on February 11, 1989, and reached number 73; it was only in the chart for 1 week. In the United States, the group's best-known single was a top 20 Hot Dance Club hit, "Superficial Love," in 1992.

Their debut album, Ah...Bas Noir, contained eleven tracks. It was described as a mixture of sensuous vocals ranging from R&B-, dance-, club music-, and jazz-like styles.
