= Thea Austin =

American singer and composer (born 1960)

- Born: Thea Tereese Austin; June 10, 1960 (age 66); Pittsburgh, Pennsylvania
- Occupations: Dancer; singer; songwriter; composer

Thea Tereese Austin (born June 10, 1960) is an American singer-songwriter/composer from Pittsburgh, Pennsylvania. She is the lead vocalist and co-writer of the German Eurodance hit song "Rhythm Is a Dancer" by Snap!

== Early life and career ==
Austin was born on June 10, 1960, in Pittsburgh. She began singing with her older sister Vontelle at the age of four and by eight singing became her paying profession. In California, she was a music columnist for magazines including The R&B Report, an industry trade publication. She has four sisters and one brother, and has been married once.

== Musical career ==
=== Snap! ===
In the early 1990s, Austin finished a tour in Japan and on returning to Los Angeles began writing for a solo album with the dance music producer Michael Eckart (Stacey Q). She was introduced through a mutual friend to Penny Ford who had just left the group Snap! to pursue a solo career after the success of "The Power". In Germany, she met the producers Michael Münzing and Luca Anzilotti. The result of that meeting was the Snap! album, The Madman's Return, on which she wrote or co-wrote all of the songs including Snap!'s cross-Atlantic hit "Rhythm Is a Dancer". She received the BMI Pop Award in 2015 when Jeremih's hit "Don't 'Tell 'Em" incorporated her lyrics.

Originally, "Rhythm Is a Dancer" was going to be released as the lead single, but after objections from Turbo B, "Colour of Love", also co-written by Austin and with Austin's lead vocals, was released as the single. The song charted at number 6 in France and Sweden, number 9 in Germany and number 54 in the UK. "Rhythm Is a Dancer" fared better, charting at number 1 in the UK, France, Netherlands, Italy and Germany, and at number 5 in the US. Other singles from the album co-written by Austin included "Do You See The Light" which was later covered by Nikki Harris.

=== Soulsearcher ===
In 1999, Austin teamed up with Marc Pomeroy to form Soulsearcher, which had a No. 8 hit on the UK Singles Chart with "Can't Get Enough" which drew inspiration from and sampled Gary's Gang's "Let's Lovedance Tonight" and later on that year charted at No. 20 on the Dance Music/Club Play Singles chart. The duo performed at The Prince's Trust Party in the Park all-star concert in London in 1999. Their second single, "Do It to Me Again", charted at No. 32 on the UK Singles Chart (The AllMusic entry for Soulsearcher states that the song charted at No. 13) after which they split up.

=== Pusaka ===
Austin joined Pusaka and wrote and sung lead vocals for their 2001 hit, "You're the Worst Thing for Me", which was awarded the Best Underground 12" Award at the Winter Music Conference in Miami in March 2002 and charted at #34 on the Hot Dance Music/Maxi-Singles Sales chart and #1 on the Dance Music/Club Play Singles chart.

=== Boombox! ===
A May 2022 concert residency at the Westgate Las Vegas titled "Boombox!" had an alternating cast of hip hop artists, including Austin, accompanied by a live DJ and drummer.

== Charted singles ==
Original artist	Year	Title	Peak chart positions									Album
Original artist	Year	Title	FRA	SWE	GER	UK	NETH	ITA	U.S. Hot 100	U.S. Dance	U.S. Dance; Singles Sales	Album
Snap!	1991	"Colour of Love"	6	6	9	54	6					The Madman's Return
Snap!	1992	"Rhythm Is a Dancer"	1	2	1	1	1	1	5	1		The Madman's Return
Soulsearcher	1999	"Can't Get Enough"	66		84	8	46			20		Non-album singles
Soulsearcher	2000	"Do It to Me Again"				32						Non-album singles
Pusaka	2002	"You're the Worst Thing for Me"								34	1	Non-album singles

== See also ==
- List of number-one dance hits (United States)
- List of artists who reached number one on the US Dance chart
