= Rhythm Is a Dancer =

1992 single by Snap!

Single by Snap!

from the album The Madman's Return
- Released: 30 March 1992
- Genre: Eurodance; Eurohouse; rave
- Length: 5:32; 3:38 (radio edit)
- Label: Arista; Logic
- Songwriters: Benito Benites; John "Virgo" Garrett III; Thea Austin; Toni C.
- Producers: Benito Benites; John "Virgo" Garrett III

Snap! singles chronology
| "Colour of Love" (1991) | "Rhythm Is a Dancer" (1992) | "Exterminate!" (1993) |

Music video
- "Rhythm Is a Dancer" on YouTube

Alternative cover
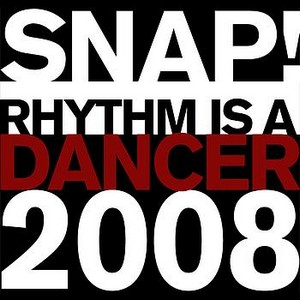
- 2008 version

"Rhythm Is a Dancer" is a song by German Eurodance group Snap!, released in March 1992 by Arista and Logic Records as the second single from their second studio album, The Madman's Return (1992). It features vocals by American singer Thea Austin. The song is written by Benito Benites, John "Virgo" Garrett III (aliases for German producers Michael Münzing and Luca Anzilotti) and Austin, and produced by Benites and Garrett III. It was an international success, topping the charts of 11 countries. The single also entered the top five of the US Billboard Hot 100 and peaked at number one on the Billboard Dance Club Play chart. It spent six weeks atop the UK Singles Chart, becoming the second-biggest-selling single of 1992 in the UK. Its accompanying music video was directed by Howard Greenhalgh and filmed in Florida.

"Rhythm Is a Dancer" was originally not planned to be released as a single. Good club reactions to the track made Snap!'s German label, Logic, change their minds. Logic arranged a private test at its own discotheque, the Omen, to see how well the public responded to the new song. This is where the instant club appeal of "Rhythm Is a Dancer" first came to notice. Rapper Turbo B, who rejected the song when he first heard it, would go on to add a rap stanza to the track. Snap! won the 1992 Echo Award for the Best Selling Single of the Year with "Rhythm Is a Dancer".

== Composition ==
"Rhythm Is a Dancer" features vocals by Thea Austin, and the 7-inch version features a rap verse by Turbo B.

According to Muz hit.tubes, a book which analyses the French pop charts, "This discotheque song alternates female singing in the chorus with fluid, set black male raps in the verses. These are tinted with a resonant sonority, which gives them an astonishingly melancholic softness, for a dance hit. That gives the whole track a particular colour, almost nostalgia."

The spoken-word passage on the album version (not the 7-inch version) is a slightly modified version of the following lines from an essay by John Perry Barlow called "Being in Nothingness: Virtual Reality and the Pioneers of Cyberspace" and were performed by studio engineer Daniel Iribarren.

How very like the future this place might be: a tiny world just big enough to support the cubicle of one Knowledge Worker. I feel a wave of loneliness and head back down. But I'm going too fast. I plunge right on through the office floor and into the bottomless indigo below. Suddenly I can't remember how to stop and turn around. Do I point behind myself? Do I have to turn around before I can point? I flip into brain fugue.

The song was originally released as a bonus track on The Madman's Return CD, and did not appear on the initial vinyl release. The spoken-word passage was replaced with a rap by Turbo B when it was decided that the song would be released as the second single off the album.

Turbo B's rap contains what one critic called the worst lyrics of all time, "I'm serious as cancer when I say rhythm is a dancer". The original album version of the song did not contain the line, which is found on the more widely known 7-inch version edit of the song that was later added to the album. The immediate reaction of Turbo B when presented with the line was reportedly 'No way am I singing that shit!' Although Snap! were criticized for the line and Turbo B later stated he hated it, the line had been used in hip hop music since the late 1980s and earlier it was heard in James Brown's 1975 re-recording of Sex Machine, with Brown riffing "I'm serious as cancer, Jack. I'm more direct than a heart attack".

"Rhythm Is a Dancer" contains the hook/riff sample from the 1984 song "Automan" by Newcleus, written in the key of A minor with a tempo of 124 beats per minute in common time. The song follows a chord progression of F–G–Am, and the vocals span from A_{3} to C_{5}. The bassline groove repeats an A-F-G-A pattern with anticipation quavers. During the rap break the music hangs on Am/A chord/bass combination.

== Critical reception ==
AllMusic named "Rhythm Is a Dancer" one of the "standout" tracks from The Madman's Return. Ken Capobianco from The Boston Globe complimented Thea Austin's "colorful" voice, adding that "everything gels" on the "intoxicating" track. German Bunte named it "the mother of all Eurodance songs". Andy Kastanas from The Charlotte Observer called it "a Euro-house marvel that's not to be missed". Leah Greenblatt from Entertainment Weekly noted that the dance-floor anthem "became the stuff sweet Club MTV dreams were made of". Tom Ewing of Freaky Trigger remarked its "stateliness and spaciousness" and described it as "higher minded, more spiritual". Dave Sholin from the Gavin Report wrote "Two years ago, 'The Power' dominated radio both here and abroad. Snap! kind of dropped out of sight since then, and they mark their return with a Euro-dance sound that's a mega-hit internationally. Sparks fly from start to finish".

James Arena, writer of Stars of '90s Dance Pop: 29 Hitmakers Discuss Their Careers, wrote "From its distinctively electrifying opening chords to its powerful rolling beats, unusually poetic lyrical depth and robust vocals, 'Rhythm Is a Dancer' [...] is one of the most recognizable success stories of the '90s". British Lennox Herald noted that the song is "more house-oriented" than their previous hits. Alan Jones from Music Week felt it's "their most commercial offering" since their debut single, adding that "it's also their most credible dance groove, and is sure to race into the Top 10". James Hamilton from the Record Mirror Dance Update noted the "Giorgio Moroder-ish buzzing synth" in his weekly dance column. Eric McClary from Reno Gazette-Journal complimented it as "the quintessential rave track, with its fast, sharp-edged industrial beat". Tim Southwell from Smash Hits praised it, commenting "Snap! have gone back to their club roots here with a wonderfully infectious and simple dance shimmer which features Spanish guitars and a wispy choir vibe".

== Chart performance ==
"Rhythm Is a Dancer" was the second single by Snap! to reach number one in the United Kingdom, the single remained six weeks at the top position in 1992, from 2 August to 13 September. The single in 1992 has reached 583,000 sales in the UK. It also topped the chart in Germany for 10 weeks. In the United States, it peaked at number five in early 1993, and spent a total of 39 weeks on the Billboard Hot 100. In France, "Rhythm Is a Dancer" debuted at number five on 8 August 1992, before climbing to number one four weeks later (where it stayed for six weeks). The song thus became the first dance single to hit the number-one position on the French Singles Chart. Additionally, the single also peaked at the number-one position in Austria, Belgium, Ireland, Israel, Italy, the Netherlands, Spain, Switzerland and Zimbabwe, as well as on the Eurochart Hot 100 and the RPM Dance chart in Canada. It earned a gold record in Australia, Austria, France, Italy, Sweden, and the US and a platinum record in Germany, the Netherlands, and the UK.

Snap! themselves re-recorded their own song in 1996 and 2003, the latter with CJ Stone (as "Rhythm is a Dancer 2003"). It reached number 17 on the UK Singles Chart in May 2003. On 25 May 2008, "Rhythm Is a Dancer" re-entered the UK Singles Chart at number 36, climbing as high as number 23 two weeks later. BBC Radio 1 DJs Fearne Cotton and Reggie Yates theorized it was based on download performance, due to its inclusion in a television advertisement for Drench water.

== Music video ==
The music video for "Rhythm Is a Dancer" was directed by British director Howard Greenhalgh and premiered in July 1992. It was filmed at the Kennedy Space Center Visitor Complex in Florida, and shows singer Thea Austin, and rapper Turbo B (Durron Butler) playing a bass guitar in the rocket garden, which is filled with smoke. Austin and her group perform the song on elevated platforms, while a group of dancers balanced their dance moves on a closed ground platform below them. Interspersed throughout these scenes are animated shots of flashing aviation maps, as well as animated figures balancing their dance moves. This was the last video to feature both Turbo B and Austin before they left the group.

At the time of release, Montreal Gazette music critic Kathleen McCourt praised the video's "originality in costume and design" but wrote in disdain, "Don't waste your time with this clip." In 1994, Alf Björnberg wrote that the "video is manifestly non-narrative", that the visuals are music-reliant, and that the video's content is "not strongly structured by the visuals nor by the music".

== Impact and legacy ==
In the 2017 book, Stars of 90's Dance Pop: 29 Hitmakers Discuss Their Careers by James Arena, singer Thea Austin said about the song, "I believe 'Rhythm Is a Dancer' resonates so powerfully because it is spiritually and creatively blessed. The producers and I had amazing energy and great intent in our creative process. The melodies are hypnotic and make people feel good, like a nursery rhyme that people gravitate towards. The music is so unique in that there was and is no other song that sounds like 'Rhythm Is a Dancer'. To me, it was a perfect marriage of music and voice. [...] People wanted a song like that back then—something to kickstart their day, free them up. It was a time in life that people were being liberated, like in South Africa or for the LGBT community in the States, and the song represents that liberation for many people."

In 1994, Peter Paphides and Simon Price of Melody Maker praised songs such as "What Is Love", "Mr. Vain" and "Rhythm Is a Dancer" as modern classics, "butt-shaking Wagnerian disco monsters. Or, as someone else who knew a thing or two put it: Che Guevara and Debussy to a disco beat." In 2000, VH1 ranked "Rhythm Is a Dancer" number 36 in their list of "100 Greatest Dance Songs". In 2008, it was featured in an advertisement for the Drench spring water brand from drink company Britvic, featuring Brains, a character from the TV series Thunderbirds, dancing to the song. In November 2011, MTV Dance ranked the song number four in their list of "The 100 Biggest '90s Dance Anthems of All Time". In 2012, the track was chosen "Best Song of the Nineties" in the Nineties Top 99 on the Belgian Radio MNM for the fourth year in a row. In 2017, BuzzFeed ranked it number 30 in their "The 101 Greatest Dance Songs of the '90s" list in 2017.

In 2019, Billboard magazine featured "Rhythm Is a Dancer" in their list of "Billboard's Top Songs of the '90s" In 2020, The Guardian ranked it number 69 in their list of "The 100 greatest UK No 1s" in 2020, saying, "Dance-pop in the 90s often traded in profound melancholy – Haddaway's 'What Is Love' and Corona's 'Rhythm of the Night' being other classic examples – and 'Rhythm Is a Dancer' is one of the saddest of all. With its gospel vocals and cathedral-ready chords, it makes raving feel like a serious spiritual quest rather than something to do on a Friday." Writer of the 2020 book, Move Your Body (2 The 90s): Unlimited Eurodance, Juha Soininen wrote that "Rhythm Is a Dancer" would go on to be "as meaningful to Eurodance as Donna Summer's 'I Feel Love' was to the whole dance music genre." In 2024, MTV 90s ranked it number 10 in their list of "Top 50 Rhythms of Eurodance".

== Accolades ==
Accolades for "Rhythm Is a Dancer"
| Year | Publisher | Country | Accolade | Rank |
|---|---|---|---|---|
| 1992 | Echo Music Awards | Germany | "Single of the Year" | 1 |
| 1993 | WMC International Dance Music Awards | United States | "Best House 12-inch Single" | 1 |
| 1993 | WMC International Dance Music Awards | United States | "Single of the Year" | 1 |
| 2000 | VH1 | United States | "100 Greatest Dance Songs" | 36 |
| 2005 | Bruce Pollock | United States | "The 7,500 Most Important Songs of 1944-2000" | Unranked |
| 2005 | Süddeutsche Zeitung | Germany | "1020 Songs 1955–2005" | Unranked |
| 2010 | Musikexpress | Germany | "Die 90er - Kritiker" | 20 |
| 2011 | MTV Dance | United Kingdom | "The 100 Biggest 90's Dance Anthems of All Time" | 4 |
| 2011 | Out | United States | "The 50 Gayest Songs of the 1990s" | Unranked |
| 2017 | BuzzFeed | United States | "The 101 Greatest Dance Songs Of the '90s" | 30 |
| 2019 | Billboard | United States | "Billboard's Top Songs of the '90s" | 184 |
| 2020 | The Guardian | United Kingdom | "The 100 Greatest UK No 1s" | 69 |
| 2024 | MTV 90s | United Kingdom | "Top 50 Rhythms of Eurodance" | 10 |

== Track listing and formats ==
- 7-inch vinyl single
1. "Rhythm Is a Dancer" (7-inch Edit) – 3:41
2. "Rhythm Is a Dancer" (Purple Hazed 7-inch Mix) – 4:31
- 12-inch vinyl single
1. "Rhythm Is a Dancer" (12-inch Mix) – 5:12
2. "Rhythm Is a Dancer" (Purple Hazed Mix) – 6:49
3. "See the Light" (Hard-Kick Family Version) – 7:05
4. "See the Light" (Hypnotic Base Line Mix) – 7:07
- 12-inch vinyl single – Remixes
1. "Rhythm Is a Dancer" (Rhyth Kid Version) – 5:38
2. "Rhythm Is a Dancer" (Tee's Choice Mix) – 6:19
- CD maxi single
1. "Rhythm Is a Dancer" (7-inch edit) – 3:41
2. "Rhythm Is a Dancer" (12-inch mix) – 5:12
3. "Rhythm Is a Dancer" (Purple Hazed Mix) – 6:49
- CD maxi single – Remixes
1. "Rhythm Is a Dancer" (Rhyth Kid Version) – 5:38
2. "Rhythm Is a Dancer" (Tee's Choice Mix) – 6:19
3. "Rhythm Is a Dancer" (Instrumental Rhythm) – 5:30
- CD single – 2003 remixes
1. "Rhythm Is a Dancer 2003" (Radio Edit)
2. "Rhythm Is a Dancer 2003" (CJ Stone Remix)
3. "Rhythm Is a Dancer 2003" ('92)
4. "Rhythm Is a Dancer 2003" (Video)
- CD maxi single – 2003 remixes
1. "Rhythm Is a Dancer 2003" (Video Version) – 3:20
2. "Rhythm Is a Dancer 2003" (CJ Stone Radio Mix) – 3:49
3. "Rhythm Is a Dancer 2003" ("Check This Out" Remix) – 7:06
4. "Rhythm Is a Dancer 2003" (CJ Stone Club Mix) – 7:45
5. "Rhythm Is a Dancer" ('92) – 3:42
- UK and Europe CD maxi single – 2008 remixes
1. "Rhythm Is a Dancer" (8-inch BB Mix) – 3:45
2. "Rhythm Is a Dancer" (Tom Novy Remix) – 8:01
3. "Rhythm Is a Dancer" (Original 12-inch) – 5:33

== Charts ==
=== Weekly charts ===
Weekly chart performance for "Rhythm Is a Dancer"
| Chart (1992–1993) | Peak position |
|---|---|
| Australia (ARIA) | 3 |
| Austria (Ö3 Austria Top 40) | 1 |
| Belgium (Ultratop 50 Flanders) | 1 |
| Canada Top Singles (RPM) | 19 |
| Canada Dance/Urban (RPM) | 1 |
| Denmark (IFPI Denmark) | 2 |
| Europe (Eurochart Hot 100) | 1 |
| Europe (European Dance Radio) | 1 |
| Finland (Suomen virallinen lista) | 6 |
| France (SNEP) | 1 |
| Germany (GfK) | 1 |
| Greece (Virgin) | 3 |
| Ireland (IRMA) | 1 |
| Israel (Israeli Singles Chart) | 1 |
| Italy (Musica e dischi) | 1 |
| Netherlands (Dutch Top 40) | 1 |
| Netherlands (Single Top 100) | 1 |
| New Zealand (Recorded Music NZ) | 11 |
| Norway (VG-lista) | 4 |
| Portugal (AFP) | 10 |
| Quebec (ADISQ) | 10 |
| Spain (AFYVE) | 1 |
| Sweden (Sverigetopplistan) | 2 |
| Switzerland (Schweizer Hitparade) | 1 |
| UK Singles (Official Charts) | 1 |
| UK Airplay (Music Week) | 3 |
| UK Dance (Music Week) | 3 |
| UK Club Chart (Music Week) | 5 |
| US Billboard Hot 100 | 5 |
| US Dance Club Play (Billboard) | 1 |
| US Maxi-Singles Sales (Billboard) | 2 |
| US Top 40/Mainstream (Billboard) | 12 |
| US Top 40/Rhythm-Crossover (Billboard) | 9 |
| US Cash Box Top 100 | 5 |
| Zimbabwe (ZIMA) | 1 |

Weekly chart performance for "Rhythm Is a Dancer '96"
| Chart (1996–1997) | Peak position |
|---|---|
| Netherlands (Dutch Top 40 Tipparade) | 7 |
| Netherlands (Single Top 100 Tipparade) | 4 |
| Sweden (Sverigetopplistan) | 58 |

Weekly chart performance for "Rhythm Is a Dancer 2003"
| Chart (2003) | Peak position |
|---|---|
| Australia (ARIA) | 32 |
| Austria (Ö3 Austria Top 40) | 10 |
| Belgium (Ultratip Bubbling Under Flanders) | 16 |
| Finland (Suomen virallinen lista) | 13 |
| Germany (GfK) | 7 |
| Hungary (Dance Top 40) | 24 |
| Netherlands (Single Top 100) | 46 |
| Switzerland (Schweizer Hitparade) | 35 |
| UK Singles (Official Charts) | 17 |

Weekly chart performance for "Rhythm Is a Dancer 2008"
| Chart (2008) | Peak position |
|---|---|
| Germany (GfK) | 84 |
| UK Singles (Official Charts) | 43 |

2016 weekly chart performance for "Rhythm Is a Dancer"
| Chart (2016) | Peak position |
|---|---|
| Poland Airplay (ZPAV) | 67 |

=== Year-end charts ===
1992 year-end chart performance for "Rhythm Is a Dancer"
| Chart (1992) | Position |
|---|---|
| Australia (ARIA) | 15 |
| Austria (Ö3 Austria Top 40) | 2 |
| Belgium (Ultratop 50 Flanders) | 2 |
| Brazil (Crowley) | 82 |
| Europe (Eurochart Hot 100) | 1 |
| Europe (European Dance Radio) | 1 |
| Europe (European Hit Radio) | 11 |
| Germany (Media Control) | 1 |
| Israel (Israeli Singles Chart) | 3 |
| Netherlands (Dutch Top 40) | 1 |
| Netherlands (Single Top 100) | 4 |
| Sweden (Topplistan) | 4 |
| Switzerland (Schweizer Hitparade) | 2 |
| UK Singles (OCC) | 2 |
| UK Airplay (Music Week) | 1 |
| UK Club Chart (Music Week) | 53 |
| US Billboard Hot 100 | 75 |
| US Dance Club Play (Billboard) | 6 |
| US Maxi-Singles Sales (Billboard) | 3 |

1993 year-end chart performance for "Rhythm Is a Dancer"
| Chart (1993) | Position |
|---|---|
| US Billboard Hot 100 | 25 |
| US Cash Box Top 100 | 12 |

Year-end chart performance for "Rhythm Is a Dancer 2003"
| Chart (2003) | Position |
|---|---|
| Germany (Media Control GfK) | 65 |

=== Decade-end charts ===
Decade-end chart performance for "Rhythm Is a Dancer"
| Chart (1990–1999) | Position |
|---|---|
| Austria (Ö3 Austria Top 40) | 13 |
| Belgium (Ultratop 50 Flanders) | 32 |
| Netherlands (Dutch Top 40) | 35 |

== Certifications ==
Certifications for "Rhythm Is a Dancer"
| Region | Certification | Certified units/sales |
|---|---|---|
| Australia (ARIA) | Gold | 35,000^{^} |
| Austria (IFPI Austria) | Gold | 25,000^{*} |
| Denmark (IFPI Danmark) | Platinum | 90,000^{‡} |
| France (SNEP) | Gold | 250,000^{*} |
| Germany (BVMI) | Platinum | 500,000^{^} |
| Italy (FIMI) | Platinum | 100,000^{‡} |
| Netherlands (NVPI) | Platinum | 75,000^{^} |
| New Zealand (RMNZ) | Platinum | 30,000^{‡} |
| Spain (Promusicae) sales + streams since 2015 | Gold | 50,000^{‡} |
| Sweden (GLF) | Gold | 25,000^{^} |
| United Kingdom (BPI) | 2× Platinum | 1,200,000^{‡} |
| United States (RIAA) | Gold | 500,000^{^} |
^{*} Sales figures based on certification alone.^{^} Shipments figures based on certification alone.^{‡} Sales+streaming figures based on certification alone.

== Release history ==
Release dates and formats for "Rhythm Is a Dancer"
| Region | Version | Date | Format(s) | Label(s) | Ref. |
|---|---|---|---|---|---|
| Germany | Original | 30 March 1992 | 7-inch vinyl; 12-inch vinyl; CD | Logic | |
| Australia | Original | 11 May 1992 | 12-inch vinyl; CD; cassette | Logic | |
| United Kingdom | Original | 22 June 1992 | 7-inch vinyl; 12-inch vinyl; CD; cassette | Arista; Logic | |
| Japan | Original | 2 September 1992 | Mini-CD | Ariola Japan; Logic | |
| Europe | 1996 remix | 23 September 1996 | CD | Ariola; BMG | |
| United Kingdom | 2003 remix | 5 May 2003 | 12-inch vinyl; CD | Data; Ministry of Sound | |
| Australia | 2003 remix | 23 June 2003 | CD | Ministry of Sound | |

== Covers and interpolations ==
"Rhythm Is a Dancer", which itself sampled the beat from a 1984 song called "Automan" by American electro, synth and old-school hip hop band Newcleus, has been covered by numerous artists, for example by German singer Key Biscayne (a.k.a. Lian Ross) in 1992, by Italian radio host Leone di Lernia (who recorded a parody of the song in Italian), by Max Deejay who recorded an instrumental cover in 1997, by System Drivers in 2002, by the Superb (a Brazilian rock act produced by Chilean DJ Sokio) in 2005, by Israeli-Italian artist Sagi Rei for his 2005 album Emotional Songs, by Chic Flowerz featuring Muriel Fowler in 2006.

British indie pop band Bastille's 2013 single "Of the Night" was a mashup of "Rhythm Is a Dancer" and another 1990s dance classic, Corona's "The Rhythm of the Night".

American singer Jeremih and rapper YG's 2014 song "Don't Tell 'Em" interpolates the song.

German House music DJ Damon Paul covered "Rhythm Is a Dancer" featuring Simone Mangiapane, on his album of the same name in 2014, under the Sounds United label.
