= Niki Haris =

American singer and dancer (born 1962)

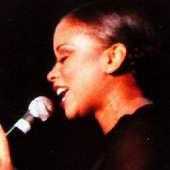
- Haris in 1993
- Born: April 17, 1962 (age 63)
- Occupations: Singer, dancer
- Known for: One of Madonna's backing vocalists
- Musical career
- Instrument: Vocals

Niki Haris (born April 17, 1962) is an American singer and dancer of pop, R&B, jazz and dance music. She was one of Madonna's backing vocalists from 1987 to 2001, and the guest lead vocalist on various Snap! singles in the early 1990s.

== Early life and family ==
Haris was born Gina Nichole Haire in Benton Harbor, Michigan on April 17, 1962, the daughter of jazz musician Gene Harris. She attended college in Southern California before pursuing a singing career in amusement parks and clubs in the California area.

Haris gave birth to a daughter, Jordan Ann, in 2003. The father is Club Nouveau member, producer, songwriter (and Karyn White's manager) Jay King.

== Music career ==
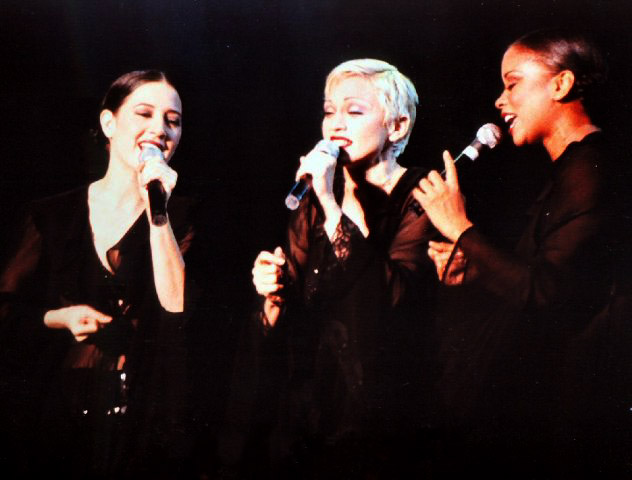
Haris (right) and Donna De Lory performing as backup singers for Madonna's Girlie Show World Tour in 1993

Haris became a close friend of, backing vocalist and dancer for Madonna during her Who's That Girl Tour (1987). She appeared in the documentary film Madonna: Truth or Dare (1991), directed by Alek Keshishian, which chronicled various personal and entertaining moments (both off- and on-stage) during Madonna’s iconic—and controversial—Blond Ambition Tour (1991). Haris also appeared in the music videos for Madonna’s number-one hit songs "Vogue" (1990) and "Music" (2000). Along with fellow backup singer Donna De Lory, Haris provided backup vocals on many of Madonna’s records between 1987 and 2000, appeared in numerous recorded and televised Madonna performances, and participated in four out of Madonna’s eight concert tours, namely the Who's That Girl Tour (1987), the Blond Ambition Tour (1990), The Girlie Show Tour (1993) and The Drowned World Tour (2001). The Who’s That Girl Tour performance in Turin, Italy, was broadcast live globally, and eventually released on home video, titled Ciao, Italia: Live from Italy (1988). One of The Girlie Show dates in Sydney, Australia, was filmed for VHS/DVD, and the Drowned World Tour performance in Madonna’s hometown of Detroit, Michigan was broadcast live on HBO, prior to VHS/DVD release. Both Haris and De Lory featured prominently in these concert tours, providing not only backing vocals and dancing but also comedic banter and interaction with Madonna throughout the shows.

For the Re-Invention Tour in 2004, Haris was replaced with Siedah Garrett. The official word from Haris was that she "would like to focus on her solo career and family". Haris was also absent from Madonna's subsequent Confessions Tour (2006), the Sticky & Sweet Tour (2008-09), the MDNA Tour (2012) and the Rebel Heart Tour (2015-16), as well as from providing backing vocals on each tour’s respective album.

Her vocal film work is also featured on the soundtracks of Corrina, Corrina, The Big Green, Noises Off, Coyote Ugly, Urban Legends: Bloody Mary and Anastasia. She has also recorded television themes, including co-writing and performing two songs for the Fox series Dark Angel.

Haris toured with her father, until his death, while promoting their albums, Down Home Blues and In His Hands and Jazz Alley Cats.

Haris performed at benefits for AIDS, cancer research and Camp Harmony for inner city children. She is a supporter for the Music in the Classroom program and Rockers Against Drunk Driving and is an annual participant in the Season for Non Violence. Niki has made several television appearances in 2008 & presently in 2009 including: The Democratic National Convention 2008, CNN, Fox Network & Fuse TV.

=== Collaborations ===
Haris has collaborated with many artists including, Michelle Branch, All Saints, Whitney Houston, Kylie Minogue, Anita Baker, Ray Charles, Karyn White, Prince, Mick Jagger, Julian Lennon, LeAnn Rimes, Luther Vandross, Jessica Simpson, Pussycat Dolls, Santana, The Righteous Brothers, Rufus, Enrique Iglesias, Marilyn Manson, Madonna, Tom Jones, Snap!, Joe Henry, Michael Bernard Beckwith and Ani DiFranco. Niki appeared on Donna De Lory's 2013 album on a track called 'Kinder'.

== Choreography and acting career ==
Haris choreographed the MTV Awards for Madonna as well as providing some additional choreography on The Girlie Show, and for the television series Melrose Place. She helped stage scenes for Sharon Stone in Basic Instinct.

Haris has performed in lead appearances in Truth or Dare, was featured artist on the HBO special Sandra After Dark, and had a role in the film Heat.

Niki appeared in, and sang backing vocals for Pee-Wee's Playhouse Christmas Special.

== Selected lead vocal credits ==
- "Do Anything" by Natural Selection featuring Niki Haris (1991); (reached No. 2 on the Billboard Hot 100)
- "There's No Business Like Show Business" (during credits of Noises Off...)
- "Exterminate!", (1992 hit performed with Snap!)
- "What's It Gonna Be" (early 1990s No. 1 dance club chart hit produced by John Jellybean Benitez)
- "Do You See the Light (Looking For)" (1993 hit performed with Snap!, re-released and remixed for European market in 2002)
- "Where Are the Boys, Where Are the Girls?" with Snap!. Featured on the CD album release of "Welcome to Tomorrow"
- "Battle Hymn of the Republic" (from Gene Harris "In His Hands" (1996) album)
- "Total Love" (hit single in Italy and Germany 2000-2001)
- "The One" (co-written by Haris from Dark Angel Soundtrack, 2002)
- "Let Me Hear the Music" (single from 2006 produced by L.E.X.– DJ Eddie X and Luigi Gonzalez– for 3 Monkeys Productions)
- "I Will Always Be There" (Urban Legends: Bloody Mary Soundtrack)
- "Bad, Bad Boy" (No. 1 on the U.S. Billboard Hot Dance Club Play chart in 2009)
- "This Time Baby" (No. 5 on the U.S. Billboard Hot Dance Club Play chart in 2009)

== Selected backing vocal work for Madonna ==
- Madonna world tours: Who's That Girl (1987), Blond Ambition Tour (1990), The Girlie Show (1993) and Drowned World Tour (2001).
- Madonna records: Who's That Girl (1987); Like a Prayer (1989); the Dick Tracy (1990) soundtrack album I'm Breathless (1990); Madonna's first greatest-hits album, The Immaculate Collection (1990); Erotica (1992); Bedtime Stories (1994); the lovesongs and slow jams collection Something to Remember (1995); Ray of Light (1998); and GHV2 (2001)—short for "greatest hits, volume two"—Madonna's second greatest-hits collection.
- Numerous televised live performances with Madonna, including the MTV Video Music Awards, Grammy Awards, MTV Europe Music Awards, and television and talkshows.

== Albums ==
- Live in Switzerland (jazz)
- Niki Haris Live (jazz)
- Niki Haris and Friends (jazz)
- The Beginning (gospel)
- Dance (pop/dance)

== Singles in charts ==
Year	Single	Peak chart positions														Album
Year	Single	US	US Dance	UK	IRE	NED	BEL (FLA)	FRA	GER	AUT	SWI	SWE	NOR	AUS	NZ	Album
1991	"What's It Gonna Be" (Jellybean feat. Niki Haris)	90	2	98	—	—	—	—	—	—	—	—	—	—	—	Spillin' the Beans (by Jellybean)
1991	"Do Anything" (Natural Selection feat. Niki Haris)	2	—	69	—	48	—	—	—	—	—	21	—	10	9	Natural Selection (by Natural Selection)
1992	"Exterminate!" (Snap! feat. Niki Haris)	—	29	2	2	5	3	18	3	9	2	7	9	50	25	Singles only
1993	"Do You See the Light (Looking For)" (Snap! feat. Niki Haris)	—	—	10	9	9	5	40	13	8	10	20	—	—	—	Singles only
2002	"Do You See the Light" (Snap! vs. Plaything)	—	—	14	—	—	—	—	66	—	—	—	—	—	—	Singles only
2006	"Let Me Hear the Music" (L.E.X. feat. Niki Haris)	—	3	—	—	—	—	—	—	—	—	—	—	—	—	Singles only
2009	"Bad, Bad Boy" (The Perry Twins feat. Niki Haris)	—	1	—	—	—	—	—	—	—	—	—	—	—	—	Singles only
2009	"This Time Baby" (Eddie X pres. Niki Haris)	—	5	—	—	—	—	—	—	—	—	—	—	—	—	Singles only
2016	"Rain" (Donna De Lory & Niki Haris)	—	—	—	—	—	—	—	—	—	—	—	—	—	—	Singles only
"—" denotes releases that did not chart or were not released.

== Filmography ==
- Heat (1995), a Michael Mann action/drama film with Al Pacino and Robert De Niro
- Women of the Night (2001), a Zalman King soft-core erotic film with Seymour Cassel, Sally Kellerman, and Donna De Lory
- Visa commercial (2007) in which Haris stars in and sings the song "Downtown"
