= Seaport Music Festival =

- Founded: Summer 2002
- Founder: Dima Productions
- Genre: Indie Rock
- Country of origin: United States
- Location: Pier 17, Pier 16, South Street Seaport, Manhattan, New York City
- Official website: http://www.seaportmusicfestival.com

Seaport Music Festival was an international music festival historically staged at South Street Seaport in lower Manhattan during the summer. Founded in 2002, the annual music series ran until Pier 17 was closed for construction. It has always been recognized for presenting a plethora of indie music's most relevant breaking and established bands—indie veterans to critically acclaimed newcomers—from around the globe. The festival was founded by Stephen Dima The festival returned in 2017 to celebrate its fifteenth anniversary.

== Overview ==
In its history, SMF became a gateway for new bands to break into other larger New York festivals in subsequent summers. They include The xx, Deerhunter, Joanna Newsom, Au Revoir Simone, Clap Your Hands Say Yeah, Sufjan Stevens, The Polyphonic Spree, Juana Molina, Benjy Ferree, Hot Chip, Oppenheimer, Camera Obscura, Bishop Allen, Tokyo Police Club, Devotchka, Atlas Sound, Spinto Band, Dirty on Purpose, Dr. Dog, Menomena, Oneida, No Age, and Telepathe, among others.

Veteran acts that are Seaport Music Festival alumni include Animal Collective, Suicide, The New York Dolls, Angelique Kidjo, A Place to Bury Strangers, Dirty Projectors, Wire, Super Furry Animals, Battles, The National, Superchunk, Polvo, and John Fogerty, among others.

== Seaport Music Records ==
By leveraging Seaport Music Festival's role as a presenter of indie music, the producers behind the series debuted Seaport Music Records in December 2009. The label's goal was to introduce new work and new bands to audiences via electronic downloads and the pressing and distribution of 12-inch vinyl records. The fledgling label's inaugural release was the Phil Spector/The Waitresses-inspired single This Christmas by The Elves of Heaven, featuring Martin Clancy.

== Little Water Radio and Seaport Music Radio ==
Little Water Radio launched at the South Street Seaport in 2015, initially as part of the Fulton Stall Market, its last home was in the historic Sweets Hotel entrance on Fulton Street, part of The Schermerhorn Row Block. Presently LWR is not airing but many of the founding member DJ's are currently broadcasting from other great independent radio stations. ' Launched on June 11, 2008, Seaport Music Radio was originally broadcast every Monday from noon to 2 p.m. on East Village Radio. Hosted by dj Pledge (a.k.a. Stephen Dima, Dima Productions), the program features a mix of pop, rock and indie from the 1960s to today, with a focus on new artists as well as interviews with special guests. The station shut down on May 23, 2014 and relaunched in conjunction with Dash Radio, June 3, 2015
