= Miguelito LaMorté =

American singer-songwriter

- Born: Michael Christopher LaMorté; December 26, 1969 (age 56); Burbank, California, U.S.
- Occupations: Singer, songwriter
- Parent(s): Anthony Fiore LaMorté; Mariann LaMorté

Miguelito LaMorté (born Michael Christopher LaMorté, December 26, 1969 in Burbank, California) is a singer-songwriter. One year after his birth his family moved to the Owyhee Indian Reservation in Nevada and a few years later Elko, Nevada. As a child, his mother nicknamed him "Miguelito". While growing up in Elko, Miguelito got his musical start playing in casino bands and working as a night disc jockey for a local radio station. After high school, he moved to Los Angeles and a year later moved to NYC, where he has lived and worked up to the present day. Miguelito has two younger sister's Mary Arlene Cridge and Toni Marie LaMorté. In 2001 LaMorté married Ronnie Spector vocalist-guitarist Tricia Scotti; they separated in 2006, then divorced in 2009.

== Early career ==
Prior to moving to Los Angeles LaMorte played in a band called Brixton 19 in which he wrote songs, sang and played guitar. The band frequently played in Boise, Idaho. During a time when the other band members became distracted by their personal lives, LaMorte wrote and released his very first solo album titled "The Luna" EP in 1990. "The Luna" EP was noted for its dance and bossa nova sounds that were considered a departure from the sound of Brixton 19. It was also the number one seller at The Record Exchange the first two weeks into its release. While working as a display artist at toy store FAO Schwarz in Manhattan, he founded pop group Mini-King, who signed a publishing pact with Warner Chappell Music and were signed to now defunct N2K Encoded Music in 1997. The group recorded an album simply titled Mini-King with producer Phil Ramone while signed. Mini-King were described by some music critics as a resurrection of the "new romantic" sound, compared to the music of bands like Spandau Ballet. The single "Get It Back Together" co-written with member Joshua Tyler was featured in the film "Row Your Boat" starring Jon Bon Jovi. The band also appeared in a Spiewak Outerwear ad campaign in 1998. Three of the members of Mini-king teamed up under the leadership of LaMorte to form the band Fictura. Fictura were known for their singles "Telephone High" and "Money Man" described by music critics as having more of a typical rock n'roll sound complete with "winsome verse, catchy chorus, and cool guitar solo". Fictura were signed to Columbia Records in 2001 but their music was never released.

Prior to Mini-King he performed with Jay Aston (Gene Loves Jezebel), and groups The Daybells, I Kill Me, and The Love Song Fools in and around New York City.

He made live appearances in long running shows 'Loser's Lounge' and 'The Beat Goes On' held at The Bottom Line, in New York City throughout the 1990s.

He was one of the first of a group of artists to enlist and perform with Musicians On Call, a charity organization that provides music performances for cancer patients in New York hospitals.

He also appeared on recordings by Dave Grusin, The Dictators, Ronnie Spector, and Common Rotation prior to 2003, when he formed Grupo Miguelito.

== 2003 to present ==
Grupo Miguelito, a Latin pop band that LaMorte founded in 2003, is considered a combination of pop, bolero and salsa. had a rotating lineup of musicians that included Jason Fratechelli, Claudia Chopek, Guy Finley, Ricardo Padrón, Tom Aldrich, Mike McGinnis, Jaime Holguin, Chris Tunkel, Mike Williams, and Zé Luis. The band were featured numerous times amongst the musical line-up at El Taller Latino-Americano (The Latin-American Workshop). El Taller is a community center offering Spanish classes that is recognized as being a cultural haven for Latin-American art and music. LaMorte, a regular of the place, was considered to be "the golden child" of El Taller, having played many shows there with his band Grupo Miguelito. Founded by Bernardo Palombo, the secrecy and alleged "magic" of El Taller has attracted musical celebrities including Gordon Gano of the Violent Femmes and David Byrne.

Miguelito LaMorte is profiled in a documentary produced and directed by J. Garrett Glaser, and narrated by Denise Turu. The film, in Spanish with English subtitles, discusses LaMorte's history as a singer-songwriter and his work in Grupo Miguelito.

With Zé Luis producing, he recorded the [Grupo Miguelito EP] in 2005, with members of the New York Philharmonic, and released Dos:The Best of Grupo Miguelito by the end of 2006.

He toured briefly as the bassist for Brazilian duo Astaire (later to become Blondfire) and also toured and recorded with rock outfit Porter Block.

== Songwriting collaborations ==
Miguelito LaMorte has also collaborated in songwriting with a variety of artists, including Larry Dvoskin and Miklos Malek – "Now I Know Why", Danny Weinkauf of the group, They Might Be Giants – "Saying Goodbye to Love", Jaime Holguin – "Enamorados (this old song of love)", Victor Hernandez Soto and Bernardo Palombo – "Carta Lagrimada", Peter Block of the band Porter Block – "Solitary Hotel", Ed Tuton – "Ride", amongst others, not listed.

The song "Enamorados (this old song of love)" was featured in the 2007 Brent Bambic film "Exploring Love".

He formed the production company Cambi Sonidos Media Group by 2007 and released the single "Corazón Sin Nido" of which he played the majority of the instruments himself and directed and produced the music video.

In late 2007 He began working with bandleader Pablo "Chino" Nuñez and by 2008 released "Yo Libre Te Conocí." He continues to record and perform with Pablo "Chino" Nuñez and his orchestra.

== Discography ==
1990 – The Luna EP, Anthony Records

1998 – Mini-King – Mini-King; N2k Encoded Music

1999 – Telephone High – Fictura; Carl Pictures Ltd

2005 – Grupo Miguelito EP – Grupo Miguelito; ZL Music/InGrooves

2005 – Open Your Mind to the Music – Grupo Miguelito "Enamorados (this old song of love)"; Poison Tree Records

2006 – Dos: The Best Of Grupo Miguelito; ZL Music/InGrooves

2006 – Hope: Love is the Answer – Grupo Miguelito “Enamorados (this old song of love)”

2007 – Corazon Sin Nido – Miguelito LaMorté; Cambi Sonidos Media Group

2008 – Yo Libre Te Conocí (featuring Pablo "Chino" Nuñez) – Miguelito LaMorté; Cambi Sonidos Media Group

2009 – She Burns Like The Sun – Miguelito LaMorté; Cambi Sonidos Media Group

2009 – Enamorados (this old song of love) Remix – Miguelito LaMorté; Cambi Sonidos Media Group

2009 – Was It Ever Love – The Complete Mixes – Richard Scotti; J-Jorn Music Publishing

=== Guest appearances ===
1998 – West Side Story – Dave Grusin “America”, background vocals, N2k Encoded Music

1998 – Kiss Me Stupid – Baby Steps, bass player

1999 – How Can a Loser Ever Win? – "I Can't Make it Alone", lead vocals, The Losers Lounge

2002 – The Big Fear – Common Rotation

2006 – The Last of the Rock Stars – Ronnie Spector, background vocals; High Coin

2007 – Solitary Hotel EP – Porter Block, bass player, background vocals; Engine Room Recordings

2007 – Melody Sweets EP – Melody Sweets, upright bass player; Composium Sounds

2008 – Comic Tales of Tragic Heartbreak – Comic Tales of Tragic Heartbreak, bass guitar, vocal arrangements, background vocals; Triple R Records

=== Production ===
2002 – Everything You Want – Don DiPaolo; DR Records

1998 – Heartcore – B-Blush (Co-Produced “Over The Moon”)

2008 – Killing With Kindness – Goodfinger; Composium Sounds
