= Snap! discography =

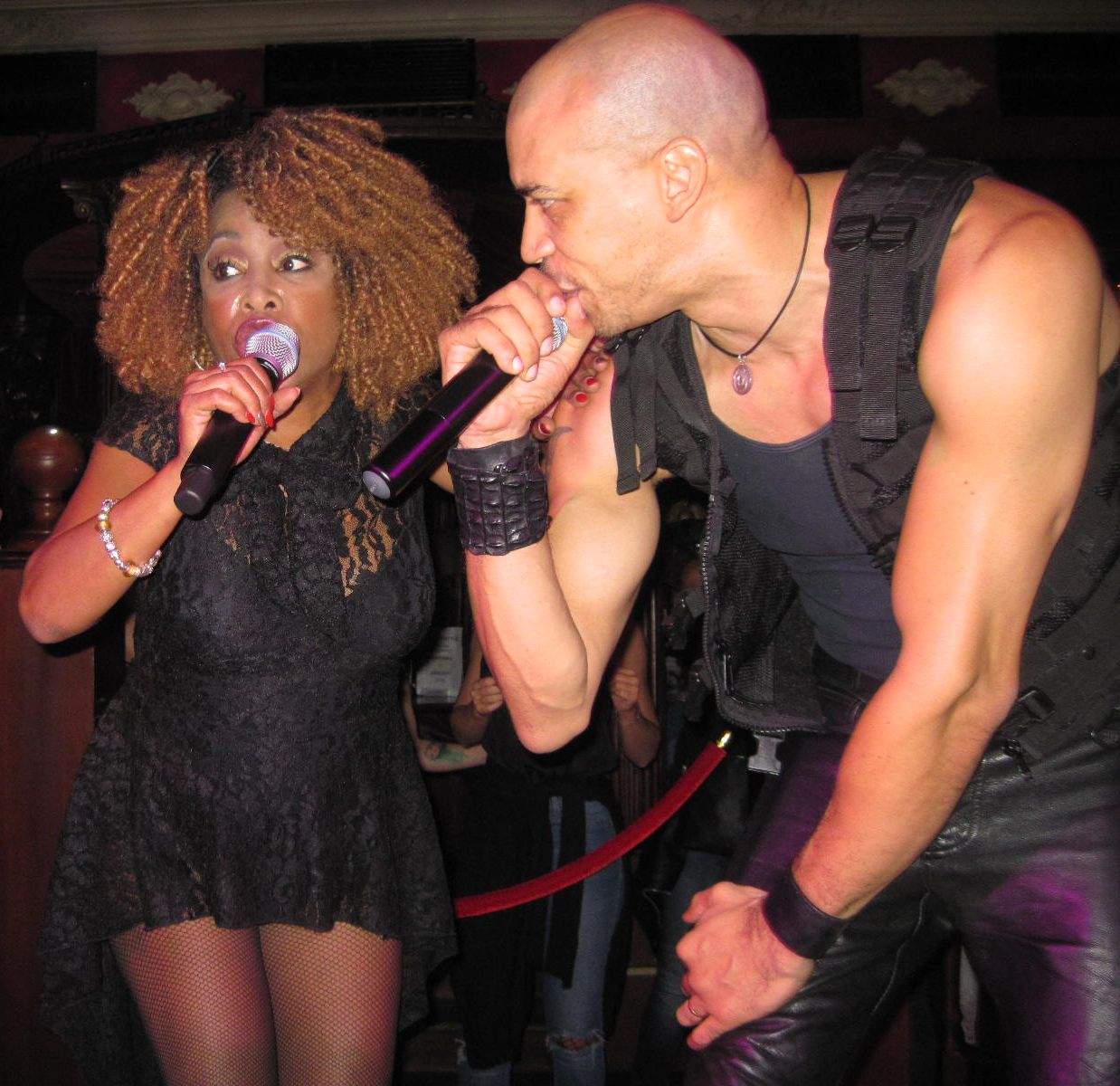
- Studio albums: 3
- Compilation albums: 5
- Singles: 24

German electronic music ensemble Snap! released three studio albums, five compilation albums, and twenty four singles.

== Albums ==
=== Studio albums ===
Title	Album details	Peak chart positions										Certifications
Title	Album details	GER	AUS	AUT	NL	NOR	NZ	SWE	SWI	UK	US	Certifications
World Power	Released: May 14, 1990; Label: Logic Snap (Sony Music); Formats: CD, Cassette, LP	7	25	4	11	—	2	20	4	10	30	BVMI: Platinum; ARIA: Gold; BPI: Gold; IFPI AUT: Gold; IFPI SWE: Gold; IFPI SWI: Platinum; NVPI: Gold; RIAA: Gold; RMNZ: Gold
The Madman's Return	Released: March 24, 1992; Label: Ariola (Sony Music); Formats: CD, Cassette, LP	3	70	3	9	12	38	21	7	8	121	BVMI: Gold; BPI: Gold; IFPI AUT: Gold; IFPI SWI: Platinum; NVPI: Gold
Welcome to Tomorrow	Released: September 30, 1994; Label: Logic Snap (Sony Music); Formats: CD, Cassette, LP	10	145	15	12	—	—	—	10	69	—	
"—" denotes items that did not chart or were not released.

=== Compilation albums ===
Title	Album details	Peak chart positions								Certifications
Title	Album details	GER	AUS	AUT	NL	NOR	SWE	SWI	UK	Certifications
Snap! Attack: The Best of Snap!	Released: August 26, 1996; Label: Logic Snap (Sony Music); Formats: CD, Cassette, LP	14	147	43	6	—	55	37	47	
Snap! Attack: The Best of Snap! Remixes & All	Released: 1997; Label: Logic Snap (Sony Music); Formats: CD, Cassette, LP	—	—	—	15	—	—	—	—	NVPI: Gold
The Power of Snap! - The Greatest Hits	Released: December 2001; Label: BMG; Formats: CD	—	—	—	—	—	—	—	—	
The Cult of Snap!	Released: July 22, 2003; Label: Bookmark (SPV); Formats: CD, Cassette, LP	43	—	59	—	5	47	26	—	
The Power: Greatest Hits	Released: October 30, 2009; Label: Hard2Beat (Rough Trade); Formats: CD	—	—	—	—	—	—	—	76	
"—" denotes items that did not chart or were not released.

== Singles ==
Title	Year	Peak chart positions										Certifications	Album
Title	Year	GER	AUS	AUT	ITA	NL	NZ	SWE	SWI	UK	US	Certifications	Album
"The Power"	1990	2	13	3	4	1	6	3	1	1	2	BVMI: Gold; ARIA: Gold; BPI: Silver; IFPI SWE: Gold; IFPI SWI: Gold; NVPI: Gold; RIAA: Platinum	World Power
"Ooops Up"	1990	2	4	2	6	2	8	2	2	5	35	ARIA: Gold; BPI: Silver; IFPI AUT: Gold; IFPI SWE: Gold; RIAA: Gold	World Power
"Cult of Snap"	1990	3	27	2	7	7	15	12	5	8	—		World Power
"Mary Had a Little Boy"	1990	4	18	9	15	2	13	7	4	8	—		World Power
"Mega Mix"	1991	15	28	22	—	6	7	17	5	10	—		Non-album single
"Colour of Love"	1991	9	66	4	3	7	36	6	4	54	—		The Madman's Return
"Rhythm Is a Dancer"	1992	1	3	1	1	1	11	2	1	1	5	BVMI: Platinum; ARIA: Gold; BPI: 2× Platinum; FIMI: Gold; IFPI AUT: Gold; IFPI SWE: Gold; NVPI: Platinum; RIAA: Gold	The Madman's Return
"Exterminate!" (featuring Niki Harris)	1992	3	50	9	4	4	25	7	2	2	—	BVMI: Gold	The Madman's Return
"Do You See the Light (Looking For)" (featuring Niki Harris)	1993	13	—	8	16	5	—	20	10	10	—		The Madman's Return
"Welcome to Tomorrow (Are You Ready?)" (featuring Summer)	1994	4	125	11	6	8	—	32	13	6	—	BVMI: Gold; BPI: Silver	Welcome to Tomorrow
"The First the Last Eternity (Till the End)" (featuring Summer)	1995	7	—	3	—	2	—	—	5	15	—	IFPI AUT: Gold	Welcome to Tomorrow
"The World in My Hands" (featuring Summer)	1995	53	—	—	—	37	—	—	—	44	—		Welcome to Tomorrow
"Rame" (featuring Rukmani)	1996	34	—	34	—	28	—	40	—	50	—		Welcome to Tomorrow
"The Power '96" (featuring Einstein)	1996	—	—	—	—	—	—	40	—	42	—		Non-album singles
"Rhythm Is a Dancer '96"	1996	—	—	—	—	—	—	58	—	—	—		Non-album singles
"Gimme a Thrill"	2000	—	—	—	—	—	—	—	—	—	—		Non-album singles
"Do You See the Light 2002"	2002	66	86	—	—	—	—	—	—	14	—		Non-album singles
"Rhythm Is a Dancer 2003"	2003	7	32	10	—	46	—	—	35	17	—		The Cult of Snap!
"The Power (Of Bhangra)"	2003	21	59	36	—	—	—	—	—	34	—		The Cult of Snap!
"Ooops Up 2003" (featuring NG3)	2003	69	—	—	—	—	—	36	—	—	—		The Cult of Snap!
"Beauty Queen"	2005	—	—	—	—	—	—	—	—	—	—		Non-album singles
"Jumping!"	2008	—	—	—	—	—	—	—	—	—	—		Non-album singles
"Rhythm Is a Dancer 2008"	2008	84	—	—	—	—	—	—	—	23	—		Non-album singles
"Megamix 2009"	2009	52	—	—	—	—	—	—	—	—	—		The Power Greatest Hits
"—" denotes items that did not chart.
