= Snap! Attack: The Best of Snap! =

Compilation album by Snap!
- Released: 26 August 1996
- Recorded: 1990–1996
- Length: 52.56
- Label: BMG

Snap! chronology
Welcome to Tomorrow (1994)	Snap! Attack: The Best of Snap! (1996)	Snap! Attack: The Best Of Snap! Remixes & All (1997)

Professional ratings
Review scores
Source	Rating
Allmusic	4/5 stars

Snap! Attack: The Best of Snap! is the first greatest hits album from German Eurodance group Snap!.

== Background ==
In 1996, following the release of three studio albums, Snap! officially disbanded and released a greatest hits compilation called Snap! Attack: The Best of Snap!.

New versions of their hits "The Power" and "Rhythm Is a Dancer" were released as singles and both charted in Sweden at No. 40 and No. 58. However, these were not included on the track listing of the album.

== Track listing ==
No.	Title	Length
1.	"The Power" (7" Version; from World Power)	3:46
2.	"Ooops Up" (7" Edit; from World Power)	3:57
3.	"Cult of Snap" (World Power Radio Mix; from World Power)	3:59
4.	"Mary Had a Little Boy" (Radio Edit; from World Power)	3:41
5.	"Colour of Love" (Massive 7"; from The Madman's Return)	3:59
6.	"Rhythm Is a Dancer" (7" Edit; from The Madman's Return)	3:41
7.	"Exterminate!" (7" Edit; from The Madman's Return)	4:13
8.	"Do You See the Light" (7"; from The Madman's Return)	4:09
9.	"Welcome to Tomorrow (Are You Ready?)" (from Welcome to Tomorrow)	4:12
10.	"The First the Last Eternity (Till the End)" (7" Edit; from Welcome to Tomorrow)	3:54
11.	"The World in My Hands" (7" Mix; from Welcome to Tomorrow)	3:55
12.	"Rame" (Original Version; from Welcome to Tomorrow)	3:54
13.	"Mega Mix" (7" Edit; non-album single)	4:39
Total length:		51:58

== Personnel ==
Adapted from the liner notes.

- Anzilotti & Münzing Productions – cover production
- Alexandra Jugovic – design
- Penny Ford – vocals (tracks 1–4, 13)
- Turbo B – vocals (tracks 1–6, 13)
- Niki Haris – vocals (tracks 7, 8)
- Summer – vocals (tracks 9–11)

== Charts ==
Snap! Attack: The Best of Snap peaked in the top 20 in Belgium, Germany and the Netherlands.

Chart (1996)	Peak position
Australian Albums (ARIA)	147
Austrian Albums (Ö3 Austria)	43
Belgian Albums (Ultratop Flanders)	18
German Albums (Offizielle Top 100)	14
Dutch Albums (Album Top 100)	6
Swedish Albums (Sverigetopplistan)	55
Swiss Albums (Schweizer Hitparade)	37
UK Albums (OCC)	47

=== Year-end charts ===
Chart (1996)	Position
Netherlands	92
