= Penny Ford discography =

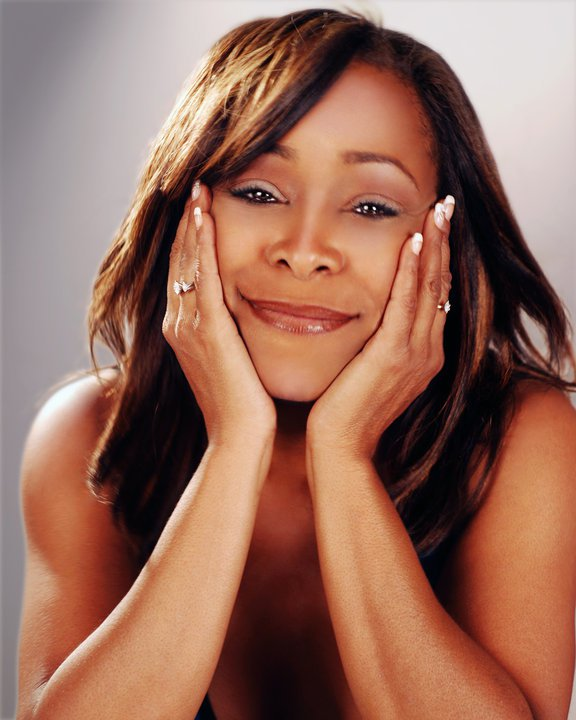
- Studio albums: 2
- Singles: 15
- Snap! albums: 1
- Album appearances: 9

American singer and songwriter Penny Ford has released two studio albums and 10 singles (as well as five as a featured artist). She has sold over 16 million records collectively as a solo artist and with Snap!

== Albums ==
=== Solo ===
| Title | Album details | Peak chart positions | |
| Title | Album details | US | US R&B |
|---|---|---|---|
| Pennye | Released: 1984; Label: Total Experience; Formats: CD, Cassette, LP | — | 39 |
| Penny Ford | Released: March 16, 1993; Label: Columbia; Formats: CD, Cassette, LP | — | — |
"—" denotes items that did not chart or were not released.

=== With Snap! ===
| Title | Album details | Peak chart positions | | | | | | | | | | Certifications |
| Title | Album details | GER | AUS | AUT | NDL | NZ | NOR | SWE | SWI | UK | US | Certifications |
|---|---|---|---|---|---|---|---|---|---|---|---|---|
| World Power | Released: May 14, 1990; Label: Logic Snap (Sony Music); Formats: CD, Cassette, LP | 7 | 25 | 4 | 11 | 2 | — | 20 | 4 | 10 | 30 | GER: Platinum; AUS: Gold; AUT: Gold; SWE: Gold; SWI: Platinum; UK: Gold; US: Gold |
"—" denotes items that did not chart or were not released.

== Singles ==
List of singles as lead artist, with selected chart positions and certifications, showing year released and album name
| Title | Year | Peak chart positions | | | | | | | | | | Certifications | Album |
| Title | Year | US | US R&B | US Dance | AUS | GER | NDL | NZ | SWE | SWI | UK | Certifications | Album |
|---|---|---|---|---|---|---|---|---|---|---|---|---|---|
| "Change Your Wicked Ways" | 1984 | — | 25 | 49 | — | — | — | — | — | — | 76 | | Pennye |
| "Dangerous" | 1985 | — | 42 | 24 | — | — | — | — | — | — | 43 | | Pennye |
| "Uh, Oh, I Made A Mistake" | 1985 | — | — | — | — | — | — | — | — | — | — | | Pennye |
| "The Power" (with Snap!) | 1990 | 2 | 4 | 1 | 13 | 2 | 1 | 6 | 3 | 1 | 1 | RIAA: Platinum; ARIA: Gold; BPI: Silver; GER: Gold; IFPI: Gold | World Power |
| "Ooops Up" (with Snap!) | 1990 | 35 | 18 | 4 | 4 | 2 | 2 | 8 | 2 | 2 | 5 | RIAA: Gold; ARIA: Gold; BPI: Silver; IFPI: Gold; SWE: Gold | World Power |
| "Cult of Snap" (with Snap!) | 1990 | — | — | — | 27 | 3 | 7 | 15 | 12 | 5 | 8 | | World Power |
| "Mary Had a Little Boy" (with Snap!) | 1990 | — | 56 | 4 | 18 | 4 | 2 | 13 | 7 | 4 | 8 | | World Power |
| "Daydreaming" | 1993 | — | 40 | — | — | — | — | 25 | — | — | 43 | | Penny Ford |
| "I'll Be There" | 1993 | — | — | — | — | — | — | — | — | — | — | | Penny Ford |
| “Wherever You Are Tonight” | 1993 | — | — | — | — | — | — | — | — | — | — | | Penny Ford |
"—" denotes items that did not chart or were not released.

=== As featured artist ===
List of singles as featured artist, with selected chart positions and certifications, showing year released and album name
| Title | Year | Peak chart positions | | | | | | | | | | Certifications | Album |
| Title | Year | US | US R&B | US Dance | AUS | GER | NDL | NZ | SWE | SWI | UK | Certifications | Album |
|---|---|---|---|---|---|---|---|---|---|---|---|---|---|
| "I Found My Baby" (The Gap Band featuring Penny Ford) | 1985 | — | 8 | — | — | — | — | — | — | — | — | | Gap Band VI |
| "Move Me No Mountain" (with Soul II Soul and Kofi) | 1992 | — | 33 | 29 | 96 | — | 62 | 40 | — | — | 31 | | Volume III Just Right |
| "Love Enuff" (with Soul II Soul) | 1995 | — | 61 | 35 | 76 | 74 | — | — | — | — | 12 | | Volume V Believe |
| "Peace in the City" (Steve E featuring Penny Ford) | 2013 | — | — | — | — | — | — | — | — | — | — | | Non-album single |
| "Everybody" (Divided Souls, Samuri & Le Alen featuring Penny Ford) | 2014 | — | — | — | — | — | — | — | — | — | — | | Non-album single |
"—" denotes items that did not chart or were not released.

== Album appearances ==
| Song | Year | Artist(s) | Album |
|---|---|---|---|
| "Silent Night" | 1984 | Penny Ford and Oliver Scott | A Total Experience Christmas |
| "Round and Round" | 1991 | Chris Boardman, Ellis Hall & Penny Ford | Tu Do Bem (Everything's OK) |
| "Insane" | 1993 | Tashan & Penny Ford | For The Sake Of Love |
| "Only Your Love" | 2006 | Bakithi Kumalo (featuring Penny Ford) | Transmigration |
| "Let It Go" | 2007 | Chris Pati (featuring Bakithi Kumalo and Penny Ford) | Music² |
| "All the Girls Are Looking (The Desperados)" | 2015 | Bernadette Cooper (featuring Penny Ford and Regina Troupe) | Last Diva On Earth Episode 1: Planet Sexy |
| "When We Rise (Extended Version)" | 2016 | DJ N'Joy (featuring Penny Ford) | The Album |
| "Nijoy Yourself" | 2016 | DJ N'Joy (featuring Penny Ford) | The Album |
| "This Could Be the Night" | 2016 | DJ N'Joy (featuring Penny Ford) | The Album |
