= The Cult of Snap! =

Compilation album by Snap!
- Released: 8 September 2003
- Recorded: 1990–2003
- Genre: Electronica, house, eurodance
- Length: 73.08
- Label: Bookmark (SPV)

Snap! chronology
Snap! Attack: The Best Of Snap! Remixes & All (1997)	The Cult of Snap! (2003)	The Power: Greatest Hits (2009)

The Cult of Snap! is a compilation album from German Eurodance group Snap!.

Following Plaything's remixed version of their single "Do You See The Light" in 2002, Snap! re-worked and re-mixed their singles with various artists', leading the release of the album, "The Cult of Snap!" in 2003. Three additional singles were released; "Rhythm Is a Dancer (2003)", "The Power (Of Bhangra)" and "Ooops Up (2003)" and all charted in Germany.

The album peaked at #5 in Norway.

== Reviews ==
Andy Kellman of AllMusic gave the album 3 out of 5 stars, saying; "Unless you haven't been paying attention (which would be understandable), you know that Snap!'s core hits -- "The Power," "Rhythm Is a Dancer," "Ooops Up!," "Mary Had a Little Boy"—have been run through just about every kind of club remix you can imagine. Downtempo, bhangra, trance, filter house, and several other stylistic trends from the past decade have had their way with Snap!, and the results are of interest only to those who really love the group. This German release collects well over a dozen of those remixes and adds a bonus disc containing the original versions, doubling as a greatest-hits set."

Professional ratings
Review scores
Source	Rating
AllMusic	3/5 stars

== Track listing ==
1. "The Power Of Bhangra" Snap! vs. Motivo (3:25)
2. "Ooops Up" Snap! vs. DJ Tomekk (3:32)
3. "Mary Had a Little Boy" Snap! vs. Milky & 2NF (3:24)
4. "The World in My Hands"Snap! vs. Fu-Tourist (4:33)
5. "Exterminate" Snap! vs. Naidoo (4:19)
6. "Colour of Love" Snap! vs. Chris Zippel (6:58)
7. "Cult of Snap" Snap! vs. Roy Malone (5:38)
8. "Rhythm Is A Dancer (2003)" Snap! vs. CJ Stone (3:18)
9. "When You're Near" Snap! vs. Twin (4:40)
10. "Do You See The Light?" Snap! vs. Plaything (4:28)
11. "Rame" Snap! vs. Ron Van Kroonenburg (4:43)
12. "Green Grass Grows" Snap! vs. Martin Eyerer (4:11)
13. "The First the Last Eternity (Till the End)" Snap! vs. Tom Novy (4:02)
14. "Welcome To Tomorrow" Snap! vs. Fragma (3:44)
15. "Angel (Rays Of Love)" Snap! (6:21)

Bonus disc (The Originals)

1. "Rhythm Is A Dancer" (Video Version) (3:42)
2. "The Power" (7" Version) (3:47)
3. "Mary Had A Little Boy" (3:41)
4. "Ooops Up" (4:01)
5. "Cult Of Snap" (3:59)
6. "Colour Of Love" (Massive Version) (4:11)
7. "Exterminate" (4:16)
8. "Do You See The Light? (Looking For)" (Radio Edit) (4:10)
9. "The First the Last Eternity (Till the End)" (3:53)
10. "Believe The Hype" (4:49)
11. "The Power" (Jungle Fever Remix '90) (6:01)

== Charts ==
Chart (2003)	Peak position
Austrian Albums (Ö3 Austria)	59
Danish Albums (Hitlisten)	23
German Albums (Offizielle Top 100)	43
Norwegian Albums (VG-lista)	5
Swedish Albums (Sverigetopplistan)	47
Swiss Albums (Schweizer Hitparade)	26

== Notes ==
- The album was released in 2003 as 'The Cult Of Snap!' in Germany / Sweden / Netherlands / Taiwan and Japan. However, the Japanese version does not include the second CD with the singles versions.
- The album was released in 2004 in Canada and omits the second CD.
- The album was released in 2004 in the US. The album was renamed 'Original Hits & Remixes' with a different artwork.
