= Mega Mix (Snap! song) =

1991 single by Snap!

Single by Snap!

from the album Snap! Attack: The Best of Snap!
- B-side: "Cult of Snap" (remix)
- Released: 18 March 1991
- Length: 4:39
- Label: Logic
- Songwriters: John "Virgo" Garrett III; R. Wilson; Lonnie Simmons; Durron Butler; Penny Ford; Charlie Wilson; Benito Benites; ToniC; Rudy Taylor
- Producers: Benito Benitez; John "Virgo" Garrett III

Snap! singles chronology
"Mary Had a Little Boy" (1990)	"Mega Mix" (1991)	"Colour of Love" (1991)

Music video
- "Mega Mix" on YouTube

"Mega Mix" is a song by German Eurodance group Snap!. It was released as a single only in March 1991 by Logic Records and comprises the four previous singles taken from their first studio album, World Power (1990). The songs in order of the mega mix are; "Ooops Up", "The Power", "Cult of Snap", and "Mary Had a Little Boy". The song is included on their 1996 album, Snap! Attack: The Best of Snap!.

== Chart performance ==
"Mega Mix" was a major hit on several continents. In Europe, it peaked at number one in Portugal and was a top-10 hit also in Denmark (number four), Finland (number two), the Netherlands, Spain, Switzerland and the United Kingdom. In the latter, the single peaked at number ten in its second week at the UK Singles Chart, on 31 March 1991. On the Music Week Dance Singles chart, it reached number eight. Additionally, it was a top-20 hit in Belgium, Germany and Sweden, and a top-30 hit in Austria. Outside Europe, it reached number seven in New Zealand, number nine in Zimbabwe and number 25 in Australia.

== Track listings ==
- 7-inch single, Europe (1991)
1. "Mega Mix" – 4:39
2. "Cult of Snap" (Cult's Dub Mosaic Meets Snap edit) – 4:26
- CD single, UK (1991)
1. "Snap Mega Mix" (7-inch edit)
2. "Cult's Dub" (Mosaic Meets Snap edit)
3. "Snap Mega Mix"
- CD maxi, Germany (1991)
1. "Snap Mega Mix" – 8:34
2. "Cult's Dub" (Mosaic Meets Snap edit) – 6:26
3. "Snap Mega Mix" (7-inch edit) – 4:39

== Charts ==
=== Weekly charts ===
Chart (1991)	Peak position
Australia (ARIA)	28
Austria (Ö3 Austria Top 40)	22
Belgium (Ultratop 50 Flanders)	11
Denmark (IFPI)	4
Europe (Eurochart Hot 100)	11
Finland (Suomen virallinen lista)	2
Germany (GfK)	15
Luxembourg (Radio Luxembourg)	12
Netherlands (Dutch Top 40)	6
Netherlands (Single Top 100)	5
New Zealand (Recorded Music NZ)	7
Portugal (AFP)	1
Spain (AFYVE)	10
Sweden (Sverigetopplistan)	17
Switzerland (Schweizer Hitparade)	5
UK Singles (OCC)	10
UK Airplay (Music Week)	22
UK Dance (Music Week)	8
Zimbabwe (ZIMA)	9

=== Year-end charts ===
Chart (1991)	Position
Europe (Eurochart Hot 100)	79
Netherlands (Dutch Top 40)	69
Netherlands (Single Top 100)	87
Sweden (Topplistan)	85
