= Aaron Carter (album) =

Studio album by Aaron Carter
- Released: December 1, 1997
- Recorded: 1996–1997
- Genre: Teen pop; pop rap; dance-pop; bubblegum pop
- Length: 46:23
- Label: Edel America; Trans Continental
- Producer: Veit Renn; Gary Carolla; Johnny Wright

Aaron Carter chronology
Aaron Carter (1997)	Aaron's Party (Come Get It) (2000)

Singles from Aaron Carter
- 1. "Crush on You" Released: August 15, 1997; 2. "Crazy Little Party Girl" Released: November 1997; 3. "I'm Gonna Miss You Forever" Released: February 1998; 4. "Surfin' USA" Released: June 1998; 5. "Shake It" Released: 1999

Professional ratings
Review scores
Source	Rating
AllMusic	2.5/5 stars

Aaron Carter is the debut studio album by American pop singer Aaron Carter, brother of Backstreet Boys member Nick Carter. It was originally released in December 1997 in Europe and re-released the next year with a new song and a remix, as well as being released in the United States in the summer of 1998.

The album reached the top 10 in some European countries and reached number 12 in the United Kingdom. While it did not chart on the US Billboard 200, it did manage to reach number 17 on the US Top Heatseekers chart, and sold more than 100,000 copies in the United States.

Three singles were released from the album; "Crush on You", a cover of the Jets' 1985 song, "Crazy Little Party Girl", and "I'm Gonna Miss You Forever". Other songs were released as limited edition singles in some regions. "Crush on You" and "Crazy Little Party Girl" went top 10 and 20 respectively in Australia, while both went top 10 in the UK. All three singles went top 20 in Germany and Sweden, with "I'm Gonna Miss You Forever" peaking at number 24 on the UK Singles Chart.

"Surfin' USA", a cover of the 1963 song by the Beach Boys, was later included on the re-release edition of the album, and released separately as an EP, and went top 20 in the UK and Germany.

The album sold more than one million copies worldwide.

== Track listing ==
All tracks produced by Gary Carolla, except "Swing It Out" by Veit Renn.

Aaron Carter track listing
No.	Title	Writer(s)	Length
1.	"Intro" (only on some releases)		1:09
2.	"I Will Be Yours"	Carolla	3:34
3.	"Crazy Little Party Girl"	Mary Applegate	3:26
4.	"One Bad Apple"	George Jackson	3:14
5.	"I'm Gonna Miss You Forever"	Carolla	3:48
6.	"Tell Me How to Make You Smile"	Carolla; Jim Sparacino; Joseph Granati; David Granati	3:47
7.	"Shake It" (featuring 95 South)	Carolla; Joe Smith	3:22
8.	"Please Don't Go Girl"	Maurice Starr	4:23
9.	"Get Wild"	Carolla; Sven Jordan; Keith McGuffey	4:44
10.	"I'd Do Anything"	Carolla	4:11
11.	"Ain't That Cute"	Brian Littrell; Nick Carter; Carolla	3:14
12.	"Crush on You"	Jerry Knight; Aaron Zigman	3:27
13.	"Swing It Out"	Renn; Jolyon Skinner	3:56

- Re-released in July 1998 with "Surfin' USA" (Main Mix) and "Surfin' USA" (Johnny Jam and Delgado Mix)

=== Other versions ===
The Japanese version of the album includes the bonus tracks:

- "Crush on You" (Remix)
- "Crazy Little Party Girl" (One Day Mix)
- "I'm Gonna Miss You Forever" (Dreamix)
- "Shake It" (Nick Carter Radio Remix)

The Canadian version has a different cover and includes a poster (different from the one that came with the German version) and has the same track listing but without "Intro".

There was also a limited edition bonus CD pack available, and with it came cards, stickers, and a bonus CD featuring:

- "Crush on You" (Gary's Mix)
- "Crazy Little Party Girl" (Main Mix)
- "I'm Gonna Miss You Forever" (Dreamix)
- "Shake It" (Nick Carter Radio Remix)
- "Surfin' USA" (album version)
- "Crazy Little Interview"

== Singles ==
1. "Crush on You" (1997)
2. "Crazy Little Party Girl" (1997)
3. "I'm Gonna Miss You Forever" (1998)
4. "Surfin' USA" (1998; released as a single/EP and included on the US edition and later on the re-release)

"Shake It" (featuring 95 South) was also released as a single in Australia and New Zealand, charting in both; at number 44 in New Zealand, and below the top 50 at number 66 in Australia.

== Personnel ==
- Aaron Carter – vocals, main performer
- Mark Matteo, Tony Battaglia – guitar
- Mark Goff, Janice Brocking Renn, Greg Whipple, David Nicoll, Michelle Lindahl, Carlos Spencer, Article Bartley – background vocals
- Dexter Redding – bass guitar
- Freddie Mollings – scratching, bass guitar
- Don Rogozinski, Pat Gullotta, John M. Robinson – horn
- Brian Snapp – flute, horn
- Gary Carolla – drums, keyboards, background vocals, producer
- Veit Renn – background vocals, producer
- Johnny Wright – executive producer
- Don Rogozinski, Michael Tucker – engineers, digital editing
- Adam Barber – engineer
- Femio Hernandez, Jim Porecca, Alan Armitage – assistant engineers
- Joe Smith – mixing
- Neils Kastor and Jorge M. Jaramillo also contributed.

== Charts ==
=== Weekly charts ===
Weekly chart performance for Aaron Carter
Chart (1997–1998)	Peak position
Australian Albums (ARIA)	51
Austrian Albums (Ö3 Austria)	17
Canadian Albums (RPM)	23
Danish Albums (Billboard)	8
Dutch Albums (Album Top 100)	36
European Albums Chart	17
Finnish Albums (Suomen virallinen lista)	27
German Albums (Offizielle Top 100)	13
Icelandic Albums (Tonlist)	18
Norwegian Albums (VG-lista)	5
Scottish Albums (OCC)	24
Spanish Albums (PROMUSICAE)	23
Swedish Albums (Sverigetopplistan)	16
Swiss Albums (Schweizer Hitparade)	16
Taiwanese International Albums (IFPI)	5
UK Albums (OCC)	12
UK Independent Albums (OCC)	3
US Heatseekers Albums (Billboard)	17

=== Year-end charts ===
Year-end chart performance for Aaron Carter
Chart (1998)	Position
Canadian Albums (RPM)	78
European Albums (Music & Media)	64
German Albums (Offizielle Top 100)	63

== Certifications and sales ==
Certifications and sales for Aaron Carter
Region	Certification	Certified units/sales
Canada (Music Canada)	Gold	50,000^{^}
Denmark (IFPI Danmark)	Platinum	50,000^{^}
Germany (BVMI)	Gold	250,000^{^}
Norway (IFPI Norway)	Gold	25,000^{*}
Spain (Promusicae)	Gold	50,000^{^}
Sweden (GLF)	Gold	40,000^{^}
United States	—	100,000
Summaries
Worldwide	—	1,000,000
^{*} Sales figures based on certification alone.^{^} Shipments figures based on certification alone.
