= To the Limit =

To the Limit may refer to:

- To the Limit (1989 film), an IMAX documentary
- To the Limit (1995 film), a 1995 American action film
- To the Limit, or Al límite, a 1997 Spanish film starring Juanjo Puigcorbé
- To the Limit (2007 film), a 2007 German film
- To the Limit (album), a 1978 album by Joan Armatrading
- To the Limit, a 1993 album from Whitecross
- To the Limit: The Essential Collection, a 2024 album by the Eagles
- "To the Limit" (song), a 2012 song by KAT-TUN

== See also ==
- Take It to the Limit (disambiguation)
