= List of number-one singles of 1990 (Spain) =

This is a list of the Spanish PROMUSICAE Top 20 Singles number-ones of 1990.

== Chart history ==
Issue date	Song	Artist
6 January	"That's What I Like"	Jive Bunny and the Mastermixers
13 January	"That's What I Like"	Jive Bunny and the Mastermixers
20 January	"Pump Up the Jam"	Technotronic
27 January	"Pump Up the Jam"	Technotronic
3 February	"All Around the World"	Lisa Stansfield
10 February	"Pump Up the Jam"	Technotronic
17 February	"All Around the World"	Lisa Stansfield
24 February	"Pump Up the Jam"	Technotronic
3 March	"Pump Up the Jam"	Technotronic
10 March	"Pump Up the Jam"	Technotronic
17 March	"Get Up! (Before the Night Is Over)"	Technotronic featuring Ya Kid K
24 March	"Enjoy the Silence"	Depeche Mode
31 March	"Enjoy the Silence"	Depeche Mode
7 April	"Enjoy the Silence"	Depeche Mode
14 April	"Enjoy the Silence"	Depeche Mode
21 April	"Enjoy the Silence"	Depeche Mode
28 April	"Vogue"	Madonna
5 May	"Vogue"	Madonna
12 May	"Vogue"	Madonna
19 May	"Vogue"	Madonna
26 May	"Vogue"	Madonna
2 June	"Vogue"	Madonna
9 June	"Infinity"	Guru Josh
16 June	"The Power"	Snap!
23 June	"Infinity"	Guru Josh
30 June	"Infinity"	Guru Josh
7 July	"La Abuela"	Wilfred y la Ganga
14 July	"La Abuela"	Wilfred y la Ganga
21 July	"Infinity"	Guru Josh
28 July	"Infinity"	Guru Josh
4 August	"Infinity"	Guru Josh
11 August	"Infinity"	Guru Josh
18 August	"Infinity"	Guru Josh
25 August	"Infinity"	Guru Josh
1 September	"Infinity"	Guru Josh
8 September	"It's On You"	MC Sar & the Real McCoy
15 September	"I Can't Stand It!"	Twenty 4 Seven
22 September	"It's On You"	MC Sar & the Real McCoy
29 September	"I Can't Stand It"	Twenty 4 Seven
6 October	"I Can't Stand It"	Twenty 4 Seven
13 October	"I Can't Stand It"	Twenty 4 Seven
20 October	"I Can't Stand It"	Twenty 4 Seven
27 October	"I Can't Stand It"	Twenty 4 Seven
3 November	"Cult of Snap"	Snap!
10 November	"Cult of Snap"	Snap!
17 November	"Cult of Snap"	Snap!
24 November	"Cult of Snap"	Snap!
1 December	"Ultimo Imperio"	Atawalpa
8 December	"I've Been Thinking About You"	Londonbeat
15 December	"I've Been Thinking About You"	Londonbeat
22 December	"I've Been Thinking About You"	Londonbeat
29 December	"I've Been Thinking About You"	Londonbeat

== See also ==
- 1990 in music
- List of number-one hits (Spain)
