= Centory =

Centory may refer to

- Centaurea, a genus of flowering plants in the family Asteraceae
- Centory (group), a 1990s German Eurodance group
