= Point of No Return (Centory song) =

Single by Centory

from the album Alpha Centory
- Released: 20 August 1994
- Genre: Eurodance
- Length: 4:20
- Label: EMI
- Songwriters: Durron Butler; Gary Carolla; Alex Trime; Sven "Delgado" Jordan
- Producers: Gary Carolla; Alex Trime; Sven "Delgado" Jordan

Centory singles chronology
"Point of No Return" (1994)	"Take It to the Limit" (1994)

Music video
- "Point of No Return" on YouTube

"Point of No Return" is a song by German Eurodance group Centory, released by EMI Records in August 1994 as the lead single from the group's only album, Alpha Centory (1994). It features Durron Maurice Butler, known as Turbo B from Snap!, who also co-wrote the lyrics and is produced by Alex Trime and Sven "Delgado" Jordan. The song became a European hit, reaching the top 10 in both Finland and Italy. Additionally, it peaked at number 16 in Germany, number 18 in Austria and number 19 in France. In the United Kingdom, the single reached number 67 in its first week at the UK Singles Chart, on December 11, 1994. The accompanying music video was directed by Oliver Sommer and Manuela Hiller for AVA Studios GmbH. It was A-listed on French music television channel MCM in December 1994 and on Germany's VIVA in October same year.

== Track listings ==
- CD single, UK
1. "Point of No Return" (Radio Version) – 4:20
2. "Point of No Return" (The 12 Inch) – 6:13
3. "Point of No Return" (Mutrone Club Mix) – 7:20
4. "Point of No Return" (Trime 'N Delgado Remix) – 7:22
- CD maxi, Netherlands
1. "Point of No Return" (Radio Version) – 4:20
2. "Point of No Return" (The 12 Inch) – 6:13
3. "Point of No Return" (Mutrone Club Mix) – 7:20

== Charts ==
Chart (1994–1995)	Peak position
Austria (Ö3 Austria Top 40)	18
Europe (Eurochart Hot 100)	57
Europe (European Dance Radio)	6
Finland (Suomen virallinen lista)	10
France (SNEP)	19
Germany (GfK)	16
Italy (Musica e dischi)	9
Scotland (OCC)	97
Switzerland (Schweizer Hitparade)	35
UK Singles (OCC)	67
