= Master Blaster (band) =

German musical group

- Origin: Germany
- Genres: EDM, Eurodance, Electro house
- Years active: 2002-present
- Members: Mike De Ville
- Past members: Sascha van Holt; Rico Bernasconi

Master Blaster is a German dance music project which formerly consisted of members Sascha van Holt, Rico Bernasconi and Mike de Ville. Currently, it consists only of Mike de Ville.

== History ==
Their most successful single, "Hypnotic Tango", samples the Italo disco hit by My Mine. In 2002, it reached the top 10 of the Media Control Charts, and was one of the most successful dance singles of the year; it also earned them an Echo nomination, and was a hit in Austria, France, Switzerland, and the UK. The following year, they released the singles "Ballet Dancer" together with Turbo B of Snap!, and "How Old R U?", another hit. Their debut album, We Love Italo Disco contains songs which sample various Italo disco hits.

In 2006, the group released "Since You've Been Gone", a cover of the 1976 Russ Ballard song. The following year they released their second studio album Put Your Hands Up. The single "Walking in Memphis"/"Can Delight" reached the top of the ClubRotation dance charts for several weeks.

== Discography ==
=== Albums ===
Title	Year
We Love Italo Disco	2003
Put Your Hands Up	2008

=== Singles ===
Title	Year	Original artist and year
"Hypnotic Tango"	2002	My Mine (1983)
"Ballet Dancer"	2003	The Twins (1983)
"How Old R U"	2003	Miko Mission (1984)
"Dial My Number"	2004	Romano Bais (1985)
"Since You've Been Gone"	2006	Russ Ballard (1976)
"Walking in Memphis / Can Delight"	2007	Marc Cohn / My Mine (1991 / 1986)
"Everywhere"	2008	Michelle Branch (2001)
"Come Clean"	2009	Hilary Duff (2003)
"Back to the Sunshine"	2010	Münchener Freiheit (1987)
"Hypnotic Tango 2k12"	2012	My Mine (1983)
"How Old Are You 2014"	2014	Miko Mission (1984)
"Now You're Gone" (& Norda)	2018	Basshunter (2007)
