= I'm Gonna Miss You Forever =

1998 single by Aaron Carter

Single by Aaron Carter

from the album Aaron Carter
- Released: 1998
- Length: 3:36
- Label: Edel Music
- Songwriter(s): Gary Carolla
- Producer(s): Gary Carolla

Aaron Carter singles chronology
"Crazy Little Party Girl" (1997)	"I'm Gonna Miss You Forever" (1998)	"Surfin' USA" (1998)

"I'm Gonna Miss You Forever" is a song by American singer Aaron Carter, released in 1998 as the third single from his debut album, Aaron Carter (1997). The single found success in European countries, particularly Sweden, where it reached the top 10, and Germany and Norway, where it reached number 13.

== Track listing ==
Maxi CD single

1. "I'm Gonna Miss You Forever" (radio edit) – 3:36
2. "I Will Be Yours" – 3:34
3. "I'm Gonna Miss You Forever" (album version) – 3:49

== Charts ==
=== Weekly charts ===
Weekly chart performance for "I'm Gonna Miss You Forever"
Chart (1998)	Peak position
Austria (Ö3 Austria Top 40)	32
Germany (GfK)	13
Ireland (IRMA)	25
Netherlands (Dutch Top 40)	28
Netherlands (Single Top 100)	56
Norway (VG-lista)	13
Scotland (OCC)	25
Sweden (Sverigetopplistan)	9
Switzerland (Schweizer Hitparade)	24
UK Singles (OCC)	24
UK Indie (OCC)	5

=== Year-end charts ===
Year-end chart performance for "I'm Gonna Miss You Forever"
Chart (1998)	Position
Sweden (Hitlistan)	84
