= Take It to the Limit =

Take It to the Limit may refer to:

- "Take It to the Limit" (Eagles song), 1975
- Take It to the Limit (Norman Connors album), 1980
- Take It to the Limit (Willie Nelson and Waylon Jennings album), 1983, includes a cover of the Eagles song
- "Take It to the Limit" (Centory song), 1994
- Take It to the Limit (Hinder album), 2008, or the title song
