= Crazy Little Party Girl =

1997 single by Aaron Carter

Single by Aaron Carter

from the album Aaron Carter
- Released: 1997
- Genre: Pop
- Length: 3:26
- Label: Edel Music
- Songwriter: Mary S. Applegate
- Producer: Gary Carolla

Aaron Carter singles chronology
"Crush on You" (1997)	"Crazy Little Party Girl" (1997)	"I'm Gonna Miss You Forever" (1998)

"Crazy Little Party Girl" is a song by American singer and rapper Aaron Carter's self-titled debut album, Aaron Carter (1997). Written by Mary S. Applegate and produced by Gary Carolla, the song was released by Edel Music as the album's second single. While failing to chart in the United States, it found success in several European countries, including Denmark, Norway, Sweden, and the United Kingdom, reaching the top 10 in all four countries. In Sweden, it was certified gold for shipping over 15,000 copies.

== Critical reception ==
British magazine Music Week gave the song three out of five, writing, "After this nine year-old's Top 10 surprise with "Crush on You" in November '97, he returns with another catchy pop number which is likely to do at least as well."

== Track listing ==
- CD single
1. "Crazy Little Party Girl" (Main mix) – 3:26
2. "Crazy Little Party Girl" (One Day mix) – 2:54
3. "Crazy Little Party Girl" (Instrumental) – 3:26
4. "Crazy Little Party Girl" interview – 5:07

== Charts ==
=== Weekly charts ===
Chart (1997–1998)	Peak position
Australia (ARIA)	20
Austria (Ö3 Austria Top 40)	19
Denmark (IFPI)	10
Estonia (Eesti Top 20)	17
Europe (Eurochart Hot 100)	34
Germany (GfK)	13
Ireland (IRMA)	23
Netherlands (Dutch Top 40)	22
Netherlands (Single Top 100)	23
New Zealand (Recorded Music NZ)	19
Norway (VG-lista)	10
Scotland Singles (Official Charts)	6
Sweden (Sverigetopplistan)	7
Switzerland (Schweizer Hitparade)	17
UK Singles (Official Charts)	7
UK Indie (Official Charts)	1

=== Year-end charts ===
Chart (1997)	Position
Sweden (Topplistan)	74

Chart (1998)	Position
Sweden (Hitlistan)	87
UK Singles (OCC)	175

== Certifications ==
Region	Certification	Certified units/sales
Sweden (GLF)	Gold	15,000^{^}
^{^} Shipments figures based on certification alone.
