= Welcome to Tomorrow =

Studio album by Snap!
- Released: 30 September 1994
- Recorded: 1993–1994
- Genres: Eurodance; trance
- Length: 46:04
- Label: Arista/Ariola
- Producer: Snap!

Snap! chronology
The Madman's Return (1992)	Welcome to Tomorrow (1994)	Snap! Attack: The Best of Snap! (1996)

Singles from Welcome to Tomorrow
- 1. "Welcome to Tomorrow (Are You Ready?)" Released: 1 September 1994; 2. "The First the Last Eternity (Till the End)" Released: 20 February 1995; 3. "The World in My Hands" Released: 11 September 1995; 4. "Rame" Released: February 1996

Welcome to Tomorrow is the third studio album by German Eurodance project Snap! It was released in 1994 on Arista/Ariola Records and made the top ten in Germany and Switzerland.

== Background ==
In 1993, Snap! producers Michael Münzing and Luca Anzilotti recruited Washington, D.C.-born singer Summer (Paula Brown) to front the act. The first single from the album was "Welcome to Tomorrow (Are You Ready?)" and was co-written by Brown. It was a top-ten hit in Germany, the Netherlands, and the UK, and went to number one in Finland. Three further singles were released: "The First the Last Eternity (Till the End)", "The World in My Hands", and "Rame", featuring Rukmani (Neela Ravindra).

== Critical reception ==
Professional ratings
Review scores
Source	Rating
AllMusic	4/5 stars
The Encyclopedia of Popular Music	3/5 stars
Music Week	3/5 stars
Robert Christgau	(dud)
Select	1/5 medals

Alan Jones from Music Week wrote, "There's a distinct softening of tones, with some competent pop vignettes, though others, such as 'It's Not Over' from the movie Neverending Story III, are a disappointment." Neil Spencer from The Observer noted, "Silkier and more ambient than their string of Euro-dance hits, the German popsters' third album puts their futurist disco kitsch into mega-drive, with Bacofoil suits and android dreams."

== Track listing ==
No.	Title	Writer(s)	Length
1.	"Green Grass Grows (Earth Follows)"	Benito Benites; John "Virgo" Garrett III; Paula Brown	4:00
2.	"It's a Miracle (People Need to Love One Another)"	Benites; Garrett; Brown	4:35
3.	"Rame (featuring Rukmani)"	Benites; Garrett	4:35
4.	"Dream on the Moon"	Benites; Garrett	5:05
5.	"Welcome to Tomorrow (Are You Ready?)"	Benites; Garrett; Brown	4:12
6.	"The World in My Hands"	Benites; Garrett; Brown; Penny Ford; Val Young	4:12
7.	"The First the Last Eternity (Till the End)"	Benites; Garrett; Brown	5:09
8.	"Waves"	Benites; Garrett	5:03
9.	"Where Are the Boys, Where Are the Girls?"	Chuck Rolando; Franco Rago; Gigi Farina; Niki Haris	4:09
10.	"It's Not Over"	Benites; Garrett	4:55

== Weekly charts ==
Chart (1994)	Peak position
Australian Albums (ARIA)	145
Austrian Albums (Ö3 Austria)	15
Belgian Albums (Ultratop Flanders)	29
Dutch Albums (Album Top 100)	12
Finnish Albums (Suomen virallinen lista)	19
German Albums (Offizielle Top 100)	10
Swiss Albums (Schweizer Hitparade)	10
UK Albums (Official Charts)	69
