= Dangerous (Penny Ford song) =

1985 song by Penny Ford

"Dangerous" is a song by Penny Ford that reached the UK Top 50 in 1985.
