= The World in My Hands =

1995 single by Snap!

Single by Snap!

from the album Welcome to Tomorrow
- Released: 11 September 1995
- Genre: Downtempo; Europop
- Length: 3:55
- Label: Ariola; BMG
- Songwriters: John "Virgo" Garrett III; Benito Benites; Paula Brown; Penny Ford; Val Young
- Producer: Snap!

Snap! singles chronology
"The First the Last Eternity (Till the End)" (1995)	"The World in My Hands" (1995)	"Rame" (1996)

Music video
- "The World in My Hands" on YouTube

"The World in My Hands" (also known as "The World in My Hands (We Are One)") is a song by German Eurodance project Snap!. It was released in September 1995 by Ariola and BMG as the third single from the project's third and final studio album, Welcome to Tomorrow (1994). The song features vocals by American singer Summer (a.k.a. Paula Brown), who had previously performed on "Welcome to Tomorrow (Are You Ready?)" and "The First the Last Eternity (Till the End)". She also shares writing credits with Snap!, Penny Ford and Val Young. Although "The World in My Hands" didn't reach the same level of success as Snap!'s earlier singles, it was a hit in Europe, becoming a top-30 hit in Flanders and a top-40 hit in the Netherlands.

== Critical reception ==
A reviewer from Music Week wrote, "The video for this single took three months to make. Chances of seeing it seem slim, though, as this is a dreary, down-tempo effort from the Europopsters." Music Week editor Alan Jones commented, "Snap! have changed since the early days when they perfected the male rap/female singer combination which has proves such a potent force in Eurodance. Now, they can confidently expect an 11th Top 20 hit with 'The World in My Hands', a brooding mid-tempo workout, with some almost tribal samples."

Gavin Reeve from Smash Hits gave it a score of four out of five, adding, "Following the funky 'Welcome to Tomorrow' and 'The First the Last Eternity', Snap come back with something that's smoother than Bob Monkhouse wearing a 100 percent silk suit. The pace has mellowed out and Summer keeps the sexy sultry vibe going with her most laid-back vocals ever. It's not as instant as other Snap hits, but once you've heard it a couple of times you'll want to hear it again and again. If only all Euro pop could be this good."

== Music video ==
The music video for "The World in My Hands" was directed by Angel Gracia and filmed in Avalon Studios, Hollywood. It was produced in three months and features singer Summer performing inside what appears to be a locomotive. The video was later made available on Snap!'s official YouTube channel in 2011. Gracia had previously directed the music videos for "Colour of Love" (1991), "Exterminate!" (1992), "Welcome to Tomorrow (Are You Ready?)" (1994) and "The First the Last Eternity (Till the End)" (1995).

== Track listings ==
- 7-inch single, Germany (1995)
1. "The World in My Hands" (7-inch mix) – 3:55
2. "The World in My Hands" (We Are One) – 4:21
- 12-inch, Germany (1995)
1. "The World in My Hands" (12-inch mix) – 5:01
2. "The World in My Hands" (dub mix) – 5:55
- CD single, Germany (1995)
1. "The World in My Hands" (7-inch mix) – 3:55
2. "The World in My Hands" (We Are One) – 4:21
- CD maxi, Europe (1995)
1. "The World in My Hands" (7-inch mix) – 3:55
2. "The World in My Hands" (12-inch mix) – 5:01
3. "The World in My Hands" (extended instrumental mix) – 5:15
4. "The World in My Hands" (We Are One) – 4:21
5. "The World in My Hands" (dub mix) – 6:27
6. "Syn Perk Dump" (S 3200) – 0:23

== Charts ==
=== Weekly charts ===
Chart (1995)	Peak position
Belgium (Ultratop 50 Flanders)	25
Europe (Eurochart Hot 100)	91
Europe (European Dance Radio)	9
Germany (GfK)	53
Israel (Israeli Singles Chart)	8
Netherlands (Dutch Top 40)	37
Netherlands (Single Top 100)	39
Scotland (OCC)	55
UK Singles (OCC)	44

=== Year-end charts ===
Chart (1995)	Position
Europe (European Dance Radio)	20

== Release history ==
Region	Date	Format(s)	Label(s)	Ref.
Germany	11 September 1995	7-inch vinyl; CD	Ariola; BMG	
United Kingdom	16 October 1995	12-inch vinyl; CD; cassette	Arista	
