= Take It to the Limit (Centory song) =

Single by Centory

from the album Alpha Centory
- Released: 28 October 1994
- Genre: Eurodance
- Length: 4:03
- Label: CDL (Cologne Dance Label) 7243 8 81881 2 8 EMI Electrola 8 81881 2
- Songwriters: Alex Trime; Gary Carolla; Sven Jordan
- Producers: Alex Trime & Delgado; Gary Carolla

Centory singles chronology
| "Point of No Return" (1994) | "Take It to the Limit" (1994) | "The Spirit" (1995) |

Music video
- "Take It To the Limit" on YouTube

"Take It to the Limit " is a song by German Eurodance group Centory. It was released on 28 October 1994 as the second single from their only album, Alpha Centory (1994), and was a notable hit in Europe. The song peaked within the top 20 in Finland and was a top 30 hit in Austria, France, Germany and Italy. On the Eurochart Hot 100, it reached number 68, while reaching number eight on the European Dance Radio Chart.

== Track listing ==
| No. | Title | Length |
|---|---|---|
| 1. | "Take It to the Limit" (Radio Version) | 4:03 |
| 2. | "Take It to the Limit" (Extended Club Mix) | 6:30 |
| 3. | "Merry, Merry X-Mas" | 4:14 |

== Credits ==
- Artwork – Shandia
- Executive producer – Werner Lindinger
- Lyrics – Durron Butler
- Music – Alex Trime, Gary Carolla, Sven Jordan
- Performers – Alex Trime, Gary Carolla, Sven Jordan, Turbo B.
- Producer – Alex Trime & Delgado, Gary Carolla
- Rap – Turbo B
- Vocals (uncredited) – Lori Glori

== Charts ==
| Chart (1994–1995) | Peak position |
|---|---|
| Austria (Ö3 Austria Top 40) | 22 |
| Europe (Eurochart Hot 100) | 68 |
| Europe (European Dance Radio) | 8 |
| Finland (IFPI) | 19 |
| France (SNEP) | 28 |
| Germany (GfK) | 22 |
| Italy (Musica e dischi) | 23 |
| Switzerland (Schweizer Hitparade) | 37 |
