= Trey D. =

American singer

- Born: Keith McGuffey
- Origin: Danville, Kentucky, U.S.
- Genres: Hip-hop, electronic
- Occupations: Singer, songwriter
- Years active: 1997–1999

Keith McGuffey, known by his stage name Trey D., is an American singer who became known for his Euro-rap songs in the mid-1990s.

He is also co-founder of a music academy called The Music Workshop, with Kevin Richardson, in Louisville, Kentucky.

== Early life ==
Keith McGuffey was born in Danville, Kentucky, to Gertrude Adams McGuffey, a bakery worker, and a taxi driver father. He is the youngest of four older siblings, all sisters, who named him after Keith Partridge of the TV series The Partridge Family. As a kid, he was known for his break-dancing skills and started writing songs when he was only nine years old. His musical influences include L.L. Cool J, New Edition, and old-school R&B when he was younger. His first concert was by Van Halen and even met his best friend Kevin Richardson when he was 12 in 1984 at Cathedral Domain Camp, a church-owned youth camp his father ran. They both played piano and wrote their first songs together, some of which were eventually used for the Backstreet Boys' first demos. After graduating high school, he attended the University of Kentucky for two years, then joined the U.S. Navy and was stationed in Little Creek, VA. After serving in the U.S. Navy, he went back to college and graduated summa cum laude with a Bachelor of Science in Business Administration/Management.

== Career ==
McGuffey started working as the manager of a TCBY store before he got his record deal after Kevin invited him down to Orlando for a visit. When he got down there, he auditioned for Transcontinental Records and got a record deal. While perfecting his act, Keith worked and toured Europe for the Backstreet Boys in 1995 as a bodyguard and worked as a recording artist in the 1990s under his stage name Trey D. As Trey D., he opened up for the Backstreet Boys and NSYNC on some of their first tours. He wrote and performed all of his own songs, including his singles, which were very successful in Europe and Asia. He even wrote AJ's rap on the group's hit single "Get Down (You're the One for Me)" and "Get Wild" for Aaron Carter. He once lived in Germany and considers it his second home.

=== Singing ===
Apart from his solo career and songwriting contributions, he also provided vocals for Centory's "Girl You Know It's True". Trey D.'s first solo single was "Higher and Higher", followed by "Mirror Mirror", which was written by him and Gary Carolla (who also did the remixes) and mixed in Orlando, Florida. The additional vocals were done by Shawn Fisher. The single was co-produced by Johnny Wright and Gary Carolla.

His third single was "Can't Wait Until Tomorrow". In 1999, Trey D. released a self-titled album under Edel Records.

=== Post-singing career ===
After touring the world and the US as an opening act for both the Backstreet Boys and NSYNC, McGuffey decided to stop being an entertainer and become a player behind the scenes. He created two songs that the Backstreet Boys recorded and released on their album Black & Blue: "More Than That" and "Shining Star". He has a joint venture with Sony/ATV in New York that allows him to develop the careers of aspiring songwriters (Shakertown Music Publishing) and is also a founding partner in Avenue 3 Music, a production company that prepares artists for recording deals. McGuffey is currently writing and producing songs for various artists, as well as recording and developing local talent in Louisville.

McGuffey and his longtime friend, Kevin Richardson, wanted to give back to their home state and surrounding areas and provide aspiring artists, musicians, songwriters, producers and engineers the foundation and necessary tools that are essential to success in the music industry. This dream led them to create The Music Workshop, a comprehensive company that would educate and guide aspiring musical artists through workshops, personal consulting, and professional demo recording.

== Personal life ==
McGuffey has been married to Julia McGuffey, an IP attorney, since December 30, 2001. The couple have two children.

== Discography ==
=== Singles ===
- 1997: "Higher and Higher" (Ultrapop)
- 1997: "Mirror Mirror" (Ultrapop)
- 1999: "Can't Wait Until Tomorrow"

Collaborations

- 1997: "Girl You Know It's True" (by Centory feat. Trey D.)
