= The First the Last Eternity (Till the End) =

1995 single by Snap!

Single by Snap!

from the album Welcome to Tomorrow
- Released: 20 February 1995
- Genre: Eurodance; trance
- Length: 5:09
- Label: Ariola; BMG
- Songwriters: John "Virgo" Garrett III; Paula Brown; Benito Benites
- Producer: Snap!

Snap! singles chronology
| "Welcome to Tomorrow (Are You Ready?)" (1994) | "The First the Last Eternity (Till the End)" (1995) | "The World in My Hands" (1995) |

Music video
- "The First the Last Eternity (Till the End)" on YouTube

"The First the Last Eternity (Till the End)" is a song by German Eurodance project Snap!, released in February 1995 by Ariola and BMG as the second single from their third studio album, Welcome to Tomorrow (1994). Like on their previous single, "Welcome to Tomorrow (Are You Ready?)", it features vocals by American singer Summer (a.k.a. Paula Brown), who also co-wrote the lyrics. Supported by a partially computer generated music video, directed by Angel Gracia, the song was a chart success in Europe, peaking at number two in both Belgium and the Netherlands, number three in Austria, and number five in Switzerland.

== Release ==
"The First the Last Eternity (Till the End)" was released in February 1995. In the 2020 book Move Your Body (2 The 90's), writer Juha Soininen noted that the new Snap! songs "were [now] harder, but at the same time [with] lighter sound. They were more clearly Eurodance than the previous efforts, but the darker aspect of Snap! sound was absent and replaced with a happier vibe."

== Chart performance ==
"The First the Last Eternity (Till the End)" was successful on the charts in Europe, peaking at number two in Belgium (in both Flanders and Wallonia) and the Netherlands. It was a top-10 hit also in Austria (3), Germany (7) and Switzerland (5), as well as on the Eurochart Hot 100, where it peaked at number seven after seven weeks on the chart. Additionally, the single was a top-20 hit in Finland (12), Scotland (11) and the UK, where it peaked at number 15 in its third week on the UK Singles Chart, on 9 April 1995. It also topped the European Dance Radio Chart, while on the UK Dance Chart, the song reached number 29. In both Ireland and Iceland, it was a top-30 hit, peaking at numbers 24 and 25, respectively.

== Critical reception ==
In his weekly UK chart commentary, James Masterton remarked that "Snap have undergone something of a metamorphosis since the hard-edged days of Turbo B and have reinvented themselves as mellow trance-pop specialists." He added that here, "new vocalist Summer [is] dreaming her way through a pleasant enough song to give the group their 10th Top 20 hit since 1990." British magazine Music Week wrote, "Again featuring vocalist Summer, Snap's latest dance tune is a catchy little number somewhat marred by the fact that 'Eternity' seems to be the only lyric in the whole song." Music Week editor Alan Jones felt the new single "is a more direct but less likable track, with pounding rhythms supporting Summer's vocals, which are not nearly as distinctive or powerful as those of some of Snap's previous singers."

James Hamilton from the Record Mirror Dance Update described it as a "Summer moaned (and sometimes not un-Donna Summer-like) frantic swirling throbber". Pete Stanton from Smash Hits gave it one out of five, writing that "it sounds like Snap have gone and nicked one of them [2 Unlimited remixes]. This has quiet bits in it filled with singer, Summer, chirruping Eternity about 12 times. Then a pumping beat comes in and we're away... Only we're not. 'Cos this is just repetitive dance drivel which'll have you pulling your hair out each time you hear it on Radio One (ie, every seven minutes)."

== Music video ==
The accompanying and partially computer generated music video for "The First the Last Eternity (Till the End)" was directed by Angel Gracia and is made like a 1940s film noir, shown as a comic story turning from page to page. Singer Summer performs as a femme fatale on the street in New York, outside a cinema, wearing a red dress and black gloves. The lyrics are shown in talk bubbles throughout the story. The opening and ending of the video shows the singer on the cover of cinema posters outside the cinema. "The First the Last Eternity (Till the End)" was A-listed on German music television channel VIVA in April 1995 and received active rotation on MTV Europe same month. The video was later made available in HD on Snap!'s official YouTube channel in 2011, and had generated more than 5.5 million views as of 2025.

== Track listings ==
- CD single
1. "The First the Last Eternity (Till the End)" (7-inch edit) – 3:54
2. "The First the Last Eternity (Till the End)" (Noto edit) – 4:04
- CD maxi
1. "The First the Last Eternity (Till the End)" (7-inch edit) – 3:54
2. "The First the Last Eternity (Till the End)" (GDC mix) – 6:28
3. "The First the Last Eternity (Till the End)" (Notonom mix) – 6:52

== Charts ==
=== Weekly charts ===
| Chart (1995) | Peak position |
|---|---|
| Austria (Ö3 Austria Top 40) | 3 |
| Belgium (Ultratop 50 Flanders) | 2 |
| Belgium (Ultratop 50 Wallonia) | 2 |
| Europe (Eurochart Hot 100) | 7 |
| Europe (European Dance Radio) | 1 |
| Europe (European Hit Radio) | 8 |
| Finland (Suomen virallinen lista) | 12 |
| Germany (GfK) | 7 |
| Iceland (Íslenski Listinn Topp 40) | 25 |
| Ireland (IRMA) | 24 |
| Israel (Israeli Singles Chart) | 12 |
| Italy Airplay (Music & Media) | 7 |
| Netherlands (Dutch Top 40) | 2 |
| Netherlands (Single Top 100) | 2 |
| Scotland (OCC) | 11 |
| Switzerland (Schweizer Hitparade) | 5 |
| UK Singles (OCC) | 15 |
| UK Dance (OCC) | 29 |
| UK Airplay (Music Week) | 20 |
| UK Pop Tip Club Chart (Music Week) | 23 |

=== Year-end charts ===
| Chart (1995) | Position |
|---|---|
| Austria (Ö3 Austria Top 40) | 17 |
| Belgium (Ultratop 50 Flanders) | 11 |
| Belgium (Ultratop 50 Wallonia) | 16 |
| Europe (Eurochart Hot 100) | 56 |
| Germany (Media Control) | 34 |
| Latvia (Latvijas Top 50) | 133 |
| Netherlands (Dutch Top 40) | 20 |
| Netherlands (Single Top 100) | 27 |
| Switzerland (Schweizer Hitparade) | 25 |

== Release history ==
| Region | Date | Format(s) | Label(s) | Ref. |
|---|---|---|---|---|
| Germany | 20 February 1995 | 7-inch vinyl; CD | Ariola; BMG | |
| United Kingdom | 20 March 1995 | 7-inch vinyl; 12-inch vinyl; CD; cassette | Arista | |
