= Cult of Snap =

1990 single by Snap!

Single by Snap!

from the album World Power
- B-side: "Blasé Blasé"
- Released: 10 September 1990
- Genre: Hip house; tribal house
- Length: 3:59 (radio edit); 5:21 (album version)
- Label: Logic
- Songwriters: John "Virgo" Garrett III; Durron Butler; Penny Ford; Benito Benites
- Producers: Benito Benitez; John "Virgo" Garrett III

Snap! singles chronology
"Ooops Up" (1990)	"Cult of Snap" (1990)	"Mary Had a Little Boy" (1990)

Music video
- "Cult of Snap" on YouTube

"Cult of Snap" is a song recorded by German Eurodance group Snap! featuring American rapper Turbo B and American singer Penny Ford. It was released in September 1990 by Logic Records as the third single from the group's debut studio album, World Power (1990). It is co-written by Ford and Turbo B with the group, and reached No. 1 in Spain for four weeks and it also peaked at No. 2 in Austria and Zimbabwe. Snap! performed the song on the British TV show Top of the Pops. Its accompanying music video was directed by Liam Kan. The song was re-recorded and included on their 2003 remix album The Cult of Snap!, featuring Roy Malone.

== Chart performance ==
"Cult of Snap" was a major hit on the charts on several continents. In Europe, it peaked at number-one in Spain for four weeks and was a top-10 hit also in Austria, Belgium, Finland, Germany, Greece, Ireland, Italy, Luxembourg, the Netherlands, Norway, Portugal, Switzerland and the United Kingdom. In the latter, the single reached number eight in its second week at the UK Singles Chart, on September 23, 1990. Outside Europe, "Cult of Snap" peaked at number two in Zimbabwe, number 15 in New Zealand and number 27 in Australia. In West Asia, it became a top-10 hit in Israel, peaking at number seven on 28 October.

== Critical reception ==
AllMusic editor Andrew Hamilton remarked the "choppy rhythms" of "Cult of Snap" in his review of World Power. American magazine Billboard described it as an "African-infused house jam". Marisa Fox from Entertainment Weekly felt it is "a dark song, with African drumbeats and chanting." Pan-European magazine Music & Media found that rapper Turbo B "raps like he's shouting orders over a monotone techno beat, spiced up with oriental and African samples." David Giles from Music Week concluded, "The best record from this outfit yet. Snap tap into a slightly salsa-based groove that stands out a mile among all the Funky Drummers, and decorate it with rapping. Afro-harmonies, and oriental melodies. A huge hit." NME noted its "tribal rhythms and chanting", "to stomp away the evenings to" on Ibiza. A reviewer from Newcastle Evening Chronicle named it one of the best songs from the album.

== Music video ==
A tribal music video was released to promote the song. It sees the band members belly dancing and charming a snake. The video was directed by Liam Kan. He also directed the music video for the group's previous single, "Ooops Up".

== Track listings ==
- 7-inch single (Logic 113 596)
1. "Cult of Snap" (World Power Radio Mix) — 3:59
2. "Blasé Blasé" — 4:32
- CD maxi (Logic 663 596 )
1. "Cult of Snap" (World Power Mix) — 6:30
2. "Cult of Snap" (Album Version) — 5:18
3. "Cult of Snap" (World Power Radio Mix) — 3:59
4. "Cult of Snap" (E-Version) — 5:54
- German Remix CD (Logic 663 639)
1. "Cult of Snap" (The Modno 2000 Mix) — 5:25
2. "Cult of Snap" (The Virtual Dub Mix) — 4:39
3. "Cult of Snap" (The Elektra Mix) — 5:25

== Charts ==
=== Weekly charts ===
Weekly chart performance for "Cult of Snap"
Chart (1990–1991)	Peak position
Australia (ARIA)	27
Austria (Ö3 Austria Top 40)	2
Belgium (Ultratop 50 Flanders)	5
Europe (Eurochart Hot 100)	4
Finland (Suomen virallinen lista)	5
Germany (GfK)	3
Greece (IFPI)	5
Ireland (IRMA)	8
Israel (Israeli Singles Chart)	7
Italy (Musica e dischi)	4
Luxembourg (Radio Luxembourg)	7
Netherlands (Dutch Top 40)	7
Netherlands (Single Top 100)	6
New Zealand (Recorded Music NZ)	15
Norway (VG-lista)	5
Portugal (AFP)	10
Spain (AFYVE)	1
Sweden (Sverigetopplistan)	12
Switzerland (Schweizer Hitparade)	5
UK Singles (Official Charts)	8
Zimbabwe (ZIMA)	2

=== Year-end charts ===
1990 year-end chart performance for "Cult of Snap"
Chart (1990)	Position
Belgium (Ultratop 50 Flanders)	68
Europe (Eurochart Hot 100)	67
Germany (Media Control)	53
Netherlands (Dutch Top 40)	77
Netherlands (Single Top 100)	56
Sweden (Topplistan)	55
UK Club Chart (Record Mirror)	93

1991 year-end chart performance for "Cult of Snap"
Chart (1991)	Position
Italy (Musica e dischi)	64

== Release history ==
Release dates and formats for "Cult of Snap"
Region	Date	Format(s)	Label(s)	Ref.
United Kingdom	10 September 1990	7-inch vinyl; 12-inch vinyl; CD; cassette	Arista; Logic	
United Kingdom	1 October 1990	12-inch remix vinyl	Arista; Logic	
Australia	29 October 1990	7-inch vinyl; 12-inch vinyl; cassette	Ariola; Logic	

== See also ==
- List of number-one singles of 1990 (Spain)
