= Welcome to Tomorrow (Are You Ready?) =

1994 single by Snap!

Single by Snap!

from the album Welcome to Tomorrow
- Released: 1 September 1994
- Genre: Eurodance; handbag house; trance
- Length: 4:12
- Label: Ariola; Arista
- Songwriters: John "Virgo" Garrett III; Paula Brown; Benito Benites
- Producers: Benito Benitez; John "Virgo" Garrett III

Snap! singles chronology
"Do You See the Light (Looking For)" (1993)	"Welcome to Tomorrow (Are You Ready?)" (1994)	"The First the Last Eternity (Till the End)" (1995)

Music video
- "Welcome to Tomorrow" on YouTube

"Welcome to Tomorrow (Are You Ready?)" is a song by German Eurodance group Snap!, released in September 1994 by Ariola and Arista Records as the lead single from the group's third and final studio album, Welcome to Tomorrow (1994). The song features vocals by the group's new American singer, Summer (also known as Paula Brown), who co-wrote the lyrics with the producers Benito Benites and John "Virgo" Garrett III. It reached number one in Finland and was also a top-10 hit in Belgium, Denmark, Germany, Italy, the Netherlands, Spain and the UK. Its accompanying music video, made with Softimage 3D and directed by Angel Gracia, took three months to finish. It depicted Summer performing in a science fiction fantasy world and received heavy rotation on European music television channels.

== Critical reception ==
Upon the release, Larry Flick from Billboard magazine noted that this time, the act that has had hits with "The Power" and "Rhythm Is a Dancer" "jumps on the bandwagon with a track that fiddles with the formula by adding choral oohs and aahs to the background, as well as a line of racing, futuristic synths. This makes the single sound different enough to jump ahead of the increasingly crowded pack and score instant (and active) play." Another Billboard editor, Ellie Weinert, wrote that it features "the smooth vocals of black female singer Summer, sailing over a trance beat reflective of Europe's underground club scene." Philippines' Manila Standard described it as "cyberpunk beat". Pan-European magazine Music & Media asked, "Does this title track to the new album reveal a new direction for the project that helped to define Euro dance? Gone are the heavy beats and the male rapper, but a female singer is still there."

Music & Media editor Robbert Tilli wrote, "Smoother and even more melodic than anything they have done before, it is the first time a Snap single can happen on radio right "out of the box", and not as an aftermath to a giant sales hit based on club play." Alan Jones from Music Week said, "With a new singer and a new label, Snap have also updated their sound, curiously opting to move away from the harder dance arena to a more obvious pop sound. It has already lost them a lot of club support and they may struggle to match previous glories this time out." John Kilgo from The Network Forty felt "Welcome to Tomorrow (Are You Ready?" "is everything you'd expect from Snap - and more. An upbeat dance number with an infectious groove". Tommy Udo from NME wrote, "It's dead good. It's less the hi-NRG Euroflash we've come to expect and is a more restrained handbag-at-yer-feet number featuring new singer Summer. Like it or lump it, it will be unavoidable for the next few months." James Hamilton from the Record Mirror Dance Update named it a "new girl cooed very attractive but beat lacking lightweight 152.3bpm flyer" in his weekly dance column.

== Chart performance ==
"Welcome to Tomorrow (Are You Ready?)" was a major hit on the charts in Europe, peaking at number-one in Finland for three weeks after debuting on the top of the Finnish singles chart in September 1994. The single was a top-10 hit also in Belgium (4), Denmark (10), Germany (4), Italy (5), the Netherlands (8), Scotland (4), Spain (8) and the UK. On the UK Singles Chart, it peaked at number six in its eight-week on the chart, on 30 October 1994. The single spent 15 weeks in total within the UK chart. Additionally, "Welcome to Tomorrow (Are You Ready?)" was a top-20 hit in Austria (11), Ireland (11) and Switzerland (13), while peaking within the top 40 in Sweden (32). On the Eurochart Hot 100, it peaked at number six in November 1994, after ten weeks on the chart.

Outside Europe, the song reached number 16 in Israel and number 125 in Australia. It was awarded with a gold record in Germany after 250,000 singles were sold, and a silver record in the UK, with a sale of 200,000 singles.

== Airplay ==
"Welcome To Tomorrow (Are You Ready?)" received a considerable amount of airplay on European radio stations. At German dance-oriented radio station Hit-Radio N1 in Nuremberg, it was put on their power-play list and also peaked at number one on their chart. In the UK, it peaked at number 11 on the Music Week Airplay chart in October. On the European Dance Radio Chart, the song almost peaked atop, peaking at number two, behind Pet Shop Boys' "Yesterday, When I Was Mad" same month, becoming the second most-played dance song on European radio that week. It ended up as the 17th most-played dance song on European radio in 1994. "Welcome To Tomorrow (Are You Ready?)" also peaked at number seven on the European Hit Radio chart in the same period. And on the European airplay chart Border Breakers, it entered at number 16 on 3 September 1994 due to crossover airplay in West Central-, West-, North West-, North- and South-Europe, peaking at the top on 29 October.

== Music video ==
"The video took a lot of hard work - three months working day and night, so we've given everyone a break for October. We had a motion control camera with film of Summer just on a seat in a blue box, and we figured there must be a way of getting the data of the motion control camera into our Silicon Graphics computer to do the same type of camera moves, so that the world would be in sync with her. So we had to write a new piece of software for that."

— Snap! talking to The Mix about making the music video.

The music video for "Welcome to Tomorrow (Are You Ready?)" was directed by Angel Gracia. It was made as a 3-D science fiction fantasy, showing Summer flying through a fantasy world, seated on a futuristic motorcycle/zeppelin contraption. The video also features a small clip taken from the video of their 1990 hit "The Power". A short film on the making of the video was also broadcast on German music television channel VIVA.

3D graphics were produced with Softimage 3D by utilised, known for the digital effects in the movie Jurassic Park the previous year, by four graphic designers and animators through six Silicon Graphics computers. The 3D production lasted more than three months in addition to two-day programming and two-day live-action filming. The music video was released one week after the single release and radio airplay.

"Welcome to Tomorrow (Are You Ready?)" received heavy rotation on MTV Europe, power play on France's MCM and was A-listed on VIVA in October 1994. In 2011, the video was made available on Snap!'s official YouTube channel. Gracia had previously directed the videos for "Colour of Love" in 1991 and "Exterminate!" in 1992.

== Track listings ==
- 7-inch (Ariola 74321 22385 7)
1. "Welcome to Tomorrow" – 4:12
2. "Welcome to Tomorrow" (7" Instrumental) – 4:12
- 12-inch vinyl (Ariola 07822–12798–1)
1. "Welcome to Tomorrow" (12" Long Edit) – 8:01
2. "Welcome to Tomorrow" (B-Mix) – 6:32
3. “Rame” (feat. Rukmani) – 6:02
- CD single (BMG Bertelsmann Music Group 74321 22752 2 / Ariola 74321 22752 2)
1. "Welcome to Tomorrow" – 4:12
2. "Welcome to Tomorrow" (7" Instr. Ahahaa-Edit) – 4:12
- CD single (Ariola 74321 22385)
1. "Welcome to Tomorrow" – 4:12
2. "Welcome to Tomorrow" (5" Instr. Ahahaa Edit) – 6:20
3. "Welcome to Tomorrow" (Are You Ready?) (B-Mix) – 6:32
- CD maxi (Ariola 74321 22385 2 (BMG) / EAN 0743212238525)
1. "Welcome to Tomorrow" (Radio Edit) – 4:12
2. "Welcome to Tomorrow" (5" Instrumental Ahahaa Edit) – 6:20
3. "Welcome to Tomorrow" (B-Mix) – 6:32

== Charts ==
=== Weekly charts ===
Chart (1994)	Peak position
Australia (ARIA)	125
Austria (Ö3 Austria Top 40)	11
Belgium (Ultratop 50 Flanders)	4
Denmark (IFPI)	10
Europe (Eurochart Hot 100)	6
Europe (European Dance Radio)	2
Europe (European Hit Radio)	7
Finland (Suomen virallinen lista)	1
Germany (GfK)	4
Ireland (IRMA)	11
Israel (Israeli Singles Chart)	16
Italy (Musica e dischi)	5
Netherlands (Dutch Top 40)	8
Netherlands (Single Top 100)	9
Quebec (ADISQ)	28
Scottish Singles Sales (Official Charts)	4
Spain (AFYVE)	8
Sweden (Sverigetopplistan)	32
Switzerland (Schweizer Hitparade)	13
UK Singles (Official Charts)	6
UK Dance (Official Charts)	31
UK Airplay (Music Week)	11
UK Club Chart (Music Week)	85

=== Year-end charts ===
Chart (1994)	Position
Belgium (Ultratop 50 Flanders)	14
Europe (Eurochart Hot 100)	35
Europe (European Dance Radio)	17
Germany (Media Control)	52
Netherlands (Dutch Top 40)	41
Netherlands (Single Top 100)	60
UK Singles (OCC)	57

== Certifications ==
Certifications for "Welcome to Tomorrow"
Region	Certification	Certified units/sales
Germany (BVMI)	Gold	250,000^{^}
United Kingdom (BPI)	Silver	200,000^{^}
^{^} Shipments figures based on certification alone.

== Release history ==
Region	Date	Format(s)	Label(s)	Ref.
Germany	1 September 1994	CD	Ariola	
United Kingdom	5 September 1994	7-inch vinyl; 12-inch vinyl; CD; cassette	Arista	
Australia	26 September 1994	CD; cassette	Ariola	
Japan	24 March 1995	Mini-CD	Ariola	

== See also ==
- List of number-one singles of 1994 (Finland)
