= Penny Ford =

American musician (born 1964)

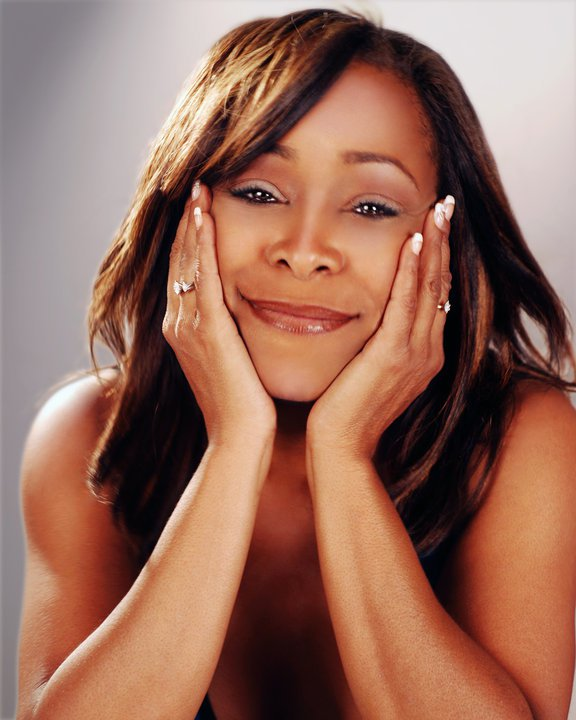

Background information
- Also known as: Pennye Ford
- Born: June 11, 1964 (age 62); Cincinnati, Ohio, US
- Genres: Dance; Eurodance; R&B; electro hop; house
- Occupations: Singer-songwriter; multi-instrumentalist; record producer
- Instruments: Vocals; piano; flute; bass
- Years active: 1979–present
- Labels: Total Experience; Ariola; Columbia
- Member of: Snap!
- Formerly of: Soul II Soul; Klymaxx

Penny Ford (born June 11, 1964), also known as Pennye Ford, is an American singer-songwriter, multi-instrumentalist, and record producer from Cincinnati, Ohio, who lives in Germany. She rose to fame in the 1980s after signing a recording contract with Total Experience Records and releasing her debut solo album, Pennye. It spawned the singles "Change Your Wicked Way" and "Dangerous", which were produced and written by Ford.

She garnered international fame as the lead singer of Eurodance group Snap! Managed and produced by Michael Münzing and Luca Anzilotti, the group released their debut album, World Power, in 1990, which sold over seven million copies worldwide and became one of the most successful dance albums to date. The album contained the hits "The Power", "Ooops Up", "Cult of Snap", and "Mary Had a Little Boy", which have collectively sold over nine million records. Snap!'s hiatus saw the release of Ford's second album, Penny Ford (1993), which established her as a solo artist worldwide and featured the singles "Daydreaming" and "I Lose Control".

Ford has also been a member of the groups Klymaxx and Soul II Soul. In 2006, she returned to Snap! and began touring worldwide with them. Throughout her career, Ford has sold over 16 million records.

== Early life ==
Penny Ford was born in Cincinnati, Ohio, to Carolyn Griffith (née Ford), an evangelist, and Gene Redd, Sr., a veteran record company executive and producer. Penny's older half-sister, Sharon Redd, was also a singer.

Ford attended St. Mark Catholic School in Cincinnati, where she enrolled in dance and music classes. Her interest in music and performing continued after winning a talented teen pageant at a young age, reading a Maya Angelou piece and singing George Gershwin's "Summertime" to beat other contestants. In 1979, she snuck into a local club where she landed a job as a background singer for electro-funk group Zapp as part of a Parliament-Funkadelic World Funk Tour at age 14. After graduating from high school at age 16, she traveled to Los Angeles, where she auditioned at a studio for Motown and was given a job as a demo singer.

== Career ==
=== 1984–1988: Beginnings ===
Following a stint as a Gap Band backing vocalist, Ford released an album entitled Pennye in 1984, and two singles from the album made the UK Singles Chart: "Change Your Wicked Ways", which reached No. 76, and "Dangerous", which reached No. 43. In 1986, Ford replaced Lorena Shelby as the lead singer of Klymaxx. After a year on the road, Ford joined the S.O.S. Band for a six-month stint, including recording "It's Time to Move" for the Police Academy soundtrack. In 1988, Ford became friends with fellow vocalist Chaka Khan while singing background vocals on "Our Day Will Come", a duet with Edwin Starr. She also toured as a background vocalist for Khan's European Tour in 1988.

=== 1989–1991: Snap! ===
During a trip to Germany in late 1989, Ford was asked to substitute for Chaka Khan when she couldn't make it to a recording session. The session was for the recording of an album for a new electronic dance group being put together called Snap! The original lineup for the group consisted of Ford, rapper Turbo B, and producers Michael Münzing & Luca Anzilotti. In early 1990, the group released their debut single, "The Power", which immediately became an international hit, selling over a million copies in America.

In May 1990, Snap! released their debut album, World Power. It reached number seven on Germany's Media Control Charts, number 25 on Australia's ARIA Charts, number four on the Ö3 Austria Top 40, number 20 on the Topplistan chart in Sweden, number four on the Swiss Music Charts, number 10 on the UK Albums Chart, and number 30 on the US Billboard 200 chart. Although it did not chart on the Dutch MegaCharts, it earned gold certification from the NVPI, for sales in excess of 60,000 copies in the Netherlands. World Power has also been certified gold in Australia, Austria, Sweden, the United Kingdom, and the United States, while it has received platinum certifications in both Germany and Switzerland.

The group's second single, "Ooops Up", also became an international success, peaking in the top-ten position on many charts. The single also earned a gold certification, selling over 500,000 copies in America. Their success continued with the singles "Cult of Snap" and "Mary Had a Little Boy", and an international tour. After the tour, the group began working on their second album. Ford took on a lesser role and only wrote two songs, "Colour of Love" and "See the Light", which were recorded by replacement members Thea Austin and Niki Haris, as Ford chose to leave the group in 1991.

=== 1991–1995: Penny Ford and Soul II Soul ===
Shortly after leaving Snap!, Ford became the subject of a major-label bidding war that resulted in her signing to Columbia/Sony in June 1991. During this time, she began recording with British musical group Soul II Soul and contributed background vocals for the song "Move Me No Mountain". The song was released as the second single of their third album Volume III Just Right in 1992. In 1992, Ford began recording her second solo album.

In March 1993, Ford released her second album, Penny Ford. Its lead single, "Daydreaming", peaked at number 40 on Billboard's R&B singles chart and number 43 on the UK Singles chart. The album also spawned two additional singles, "I'll Be There" and "I Lose Control"—the latter penned by Mariah Carey. In 1994, Ford began working with Soul II Soul again. She sang lead vocals on their single "Love Enuff", which was released in 1995. She was also present when the group performed the song on Top of the Pops.

=== 2003: Judge Mathis appearance ===
In 2003, Ford appeared on an episode of the US television program Judge Mathis, suing a producer/boyfriend. One of her witnesses was Chaka Khan. Though the latter did not appear, she spoke to Judge Mathis via telephone.

=== 2006–present: Later career and current work ===
In 2006, Ford returned as the original and official singer of the group Snap! She also rejoined with Snap! producers Michael Münzing and Luca Anzilloti, and has been performing with them worldwide. She lives in Offenbach, Germany. In 2022, Ford was inducted into the Cincinnati Black Music Walk of Fame.

== Artistry ==
Ford is a multi-instrumentalist. She has been known to play the guitar, flute, drums, percussion, bass, keyboards, and synthesizer, all of which she played during her early career as a demo singer. On her first album, she played all of the instruments on the song "Serious Love", and three instruments on the remaining songs. She has produced and arranged songs for Natalie Cole, the Gap Band, Chaka Khan, Victoria Wilson-James, and Snap!.

== Discography ==
- Pennye (1984)
- Penny Ford (1993)
