= Centory (group) =

German Eurodance group

- Origin: Germany
- Genres: Eurodance
- Years active: 1994-1996
- Past members: Turbo B Gary Carolla; Alexander Strasser; Sven Kirschner

Centory was a German Eurodance group consisting of Gary Carolla, Alexander Strasser, Sven Kirschner, and Turbo B.

Centory released one album, Alpha Centory, in 1994. It featured the singles "Point of No Return", "Take It to the Limit", "The Spirit" and "Eye in the Sky".

Centory also remixed two songs, "Mercy" and "Heart of Me" for a remix album by Cerrone. The band's last work was the single "Girl You Know It's True" released in 1996. This single was Centory's only single to not feature Turbo B; instead it featured a new singer, Trey D.

== Discography ==
=== Albums ===
Year	Title	Peak chart positions		
Year	Title	AUT	SWI	GER
1994	Alpha Centory	40	50	48

=== Singles ===
Year	Song	Peak chart positions				
Year	Song	AUT	FRA	GER	SWI	UK
1994	"Point of No Return"	18	19	16	35	67
1994	"Take It to the Limit"	22	28	22	37	—
1995	"The Spirit"	29	—	70	—	—
1995	"Eye in the Sky"	—	48	99	—	—
1996	"Girl You Know It's True" feat. Trey D.	—	—	50	—	—
"—" denotes a single that did not chart
