= Turbo B =

American rapper (born 1967)

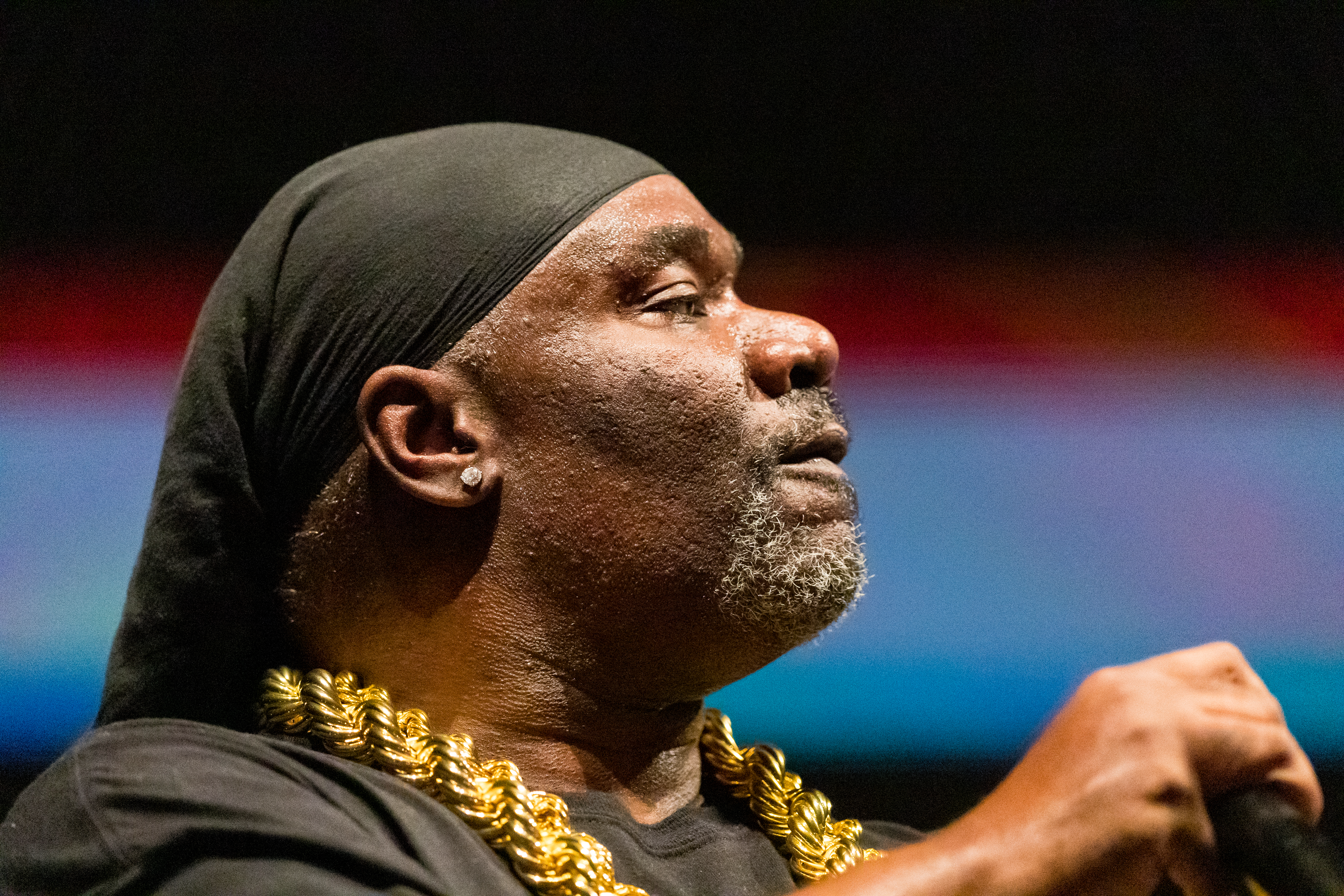
- Turbo B in 2018

Background information
- Born: Durron Maurice Butler; April 30, 1967 (age 59)
- Origin: Pittsburgh, Pennsylvania, US
- Genres: Eurodance; hip-hop
- Occupation: Rapper
- Instrument: Vocals
- Years active: 1990–present
- Formerly of: Snap!; Centory
- Website: turbobsnap.com

Durron Maurice Butler (born April 30, 1967), known as Turbo B, is an American rapper and beatboxer. He was once the frontman of the German electronic music group Snap!

After completing a period of service with the United States Army in Germany, Butler went on tour with the Fat Boys. He was soon discovered by the managers of Snap! and contributed to the albums World Power and The Madman's Return and their respective number-one hits, "The Power" and "Rhythm Is a Dancer".

After leaving Snap!, Butler pursued a solo career and also formed the group Centory, which had several minor hits. Butler is known to tour with other artists who were prominent in the 1990s. He has contributed to singles by Victoria Silvstedt, H-Blockx, Master Blaster, and Regi Penxten.

== Early years ==
Born in McKeesport, Pennsylvania, Butler started his music career as a drummer for a heavy metal band in his hometown. After joining the United States Army in July 1985, he completed basic training (C-4-3) at Fort Dix and was transferred to the 8th SC, Redstone Arsenal in Alabama for advanced training, where he qualified to become an ammunition specialist. With his training complete, he was sent to Friedberg, Germany to join the 60th Ordnance Company in Ray Barracks.

After completing his service in the army he returned to the US but went back to Germany shortly thereafter to tour with the Fat Boys. In 1989, DJ Rico Sparx discovered Butler's rapping talent and introduced him to Snap! producers Michael Münzing and Luca Anzilotti. The duo picked him to replace Chill Rob G's vocals in their song "The Power". He chose the stage name Turbo B, which had been his nickname since childhood.

== Success with Snap! ==
"The Power" became a major international hit, and Butler became recognizable as the frontman of the group. To promote their debut album, World Power, they toured widely.

In the run-up to the 1992 release of Snap!'s second album, The Madman's Return, "Rhythm Is a Dancer" was planned to be the first single. Butler reportedly hated the song and wanted "Colour of Love" to be issued instead. In December 1991, he got his wish, but "Colour of Love" went fairly unnoticed in the UK and US charts. Münzing and Anzilotti then insisted on releasing "Rhythm Is a Dancer" as the second single, and it became the group's second major international hit. Butler left Snap! shortly after due to growing dissent with the group and its managers.

In 2000, Snap! and Turbo B rejoined for a comeback and released the single "Gimme a Thrill". The song failed to chart, and their planned album One Day on Earth was subsequently never released.

== Solo career and Centory ==
After leaving Snap!, Butler pursued a solo career, releasing the album Make Way for the Maniac in 1993 on Polydor Records. It featured the singles "I'm Not Dead", "Get Wild", "What You See", and "Nice & Smooth".

He went on to form the band Centory in 1994, with Gary Carolla, Delgado (Kevin Estevez), and Alex Trime (Eddie Gibson). They released the album Alpha Centory, which spawned four minor hits in the European charts. Butler toured with Centory following their success. He did not feature on their last single, a cover of Milli Vanilli's "Girl You Know It's True", which instead featured singer Trey D.

Butler did not issue any more solo material until 2005, when his single "New Day" was released under Holy Chaos Recordings. He has contributed to singles by Victoria Silvstedt, H-Blockx, Master Blaster, and Regi Penxten, among others.

== Discography ==
=== with Snap! ===
Albums

| Year | Title | Peak chart positions | | | |
| Year | Title | UK | US | GER | SWE |
|---|---|---|---|---|---|
| 1990 | World Power: Label: Anzilotti & Munzing | 10 | 30 | 7 | 20 |
| 1992 | The Madman's Return: Label: Anzilotti & Munzing | 8 | 121 | 3 | 21 |

Singles

| Year | Title | Peak chart positions | | | | | | | | | |
| Year | Title | AUS | SWI | FRA | SWE | NOR | NLD | AUT | UK | US | GER |
|---|---|---|---|---|---|---|---|---|---|---|---|
| 1990 | "The Power" | 13 | 1 | 15 | 3 | 3 | 1 | 3 | 1 | 2 | 2 |
| 1990 | "Ooops Up" | 4 | 2 | 34 | 2 | 2 | 2 | 2 | 5 | 35 | 2 |
| 1990 | "Cult of Snap!" | 27 | 5 | — | 12 | 5 | 6 | 2 | 8 | — | 3 |
| 1990 | "Mary Had a Little Boy" | 18 | 4 | — | 7 | — | 3 | 9 | 8 | — | 4 |
| 1991 | "Mega Mix" | 28 | 5 | — | 17 | — | 5 | 22 | 10 | — | 15 |
| 1991 | "Colour of Love" | — | 4 | — | 6 | 6 | 6 | 4 | 54 | — | 9 |
| 1991 | "Rhythm Is a Dancer" | 3 | 1 | 1 | 2 | 4 | 1 | 1 | 1 | 5 | 1 |
| 1996 | "Rhythm Is a Dancer '96" | — | — | — | 58 | — | — | — | — | — | — |
| 2000 | "Gimme a Thrill" | — | — | — | — | — | — | — | — | — | — |
| 2003 | "Rhythm Is a Dancer 2003" | — | 35 | — | — | — | 46 | 10 | 17 | — | 7 |
| 2003 | "The Power (of Bhangra)" | 32 | 27 | — | — | — | 76 | 36 | 34 | — | — |
"—" denotes a single that did not chart

=== with Centory ===
Albums

| Year | Title | Peak chart positions | |
| Year | Title | AUT | SWI |
|---|---|---|---|
| 1994 | Alpha Centory: Label: Cologne Dance Label | 40 | 50 |

Singles

| Year | Song | Peak chart positions | | | |
| Year | Song | AUT | FRA | GER | SWI |
|---|---|---|---|---|---|
| 1994 | "Point of No Return" | 18 | 19 | 16 | 35 |
| 1994 | "Take It to the Limit" | 22 | 28 | 22 | 37 |
| 1995 | "The Spirit" | 29 | — | 70 | — |
| 1995 | "Eye in the Sky" | — | 48 | 99 | — |
"—" denotes a single that did not chart

=== Solo releases ===
Albums

| Year | Album details |
|---|---|
| 1993 | Make Way for the Maniac: Label: Polydor Records |

Singles

| Year | Title |
|---|---|
| 1992 | "I'm Not Dead" feat. Thea T. Austin |
| 1993 | "Get Wild" |
| 1993 | "Nice & Smooth" |
| 1993 | "What You See" |
| 2005 | "New Day" |

=== Collaborations ===
| Year | Title | Peak chart positions | | | |
| Year | Title | SWE | GER | AUS | AUT |
|---|---|---|---|---|---|
| 1999 | "Rocksteady Love" (Victoria Silvstedt ft. Turbo B) | 10 | — | — | — |
| 2002 | "The Power" (H-Blockx ft. Turbo B) | — | 48 | 34 | 51 |
| 2003 | "Ballet Dancer" (Master Blaster vs. Turbo B) | — | — | — | 37 |
| 2009 | "Don't Cha Know" (Rumanesta & Enchev ft. Turbo B and R.O.O.O.M) | — | — | — | — |
| 2010 | "We Be Hot" (Regi & Turbo B ft. Ameerah) | — | — | — | — |
| 2013 | "By the Sea" (Rumanesta & Enchev ft. Turbo B, N.A.S.O & Marieta) | — | — | — | — |
| 2014 | "Killer Is a Man Who Don't Fuck with the Music" (Susanne Blech ft. Turbo B) | — | — | — | — |
"—" denotes a single that did not chart
