= Mary Had a Little Boy =

1990 single by Snap!

Single by Snap!

from the album World Power
- B-side: "Believe the Hype" (US edit)
- Released: 26 November 1990
- Genre: Hip-house
- Length: 3:41 (radio edit)
- Label: Ariola; BMG; Logic
- Songwriters: John "Virgo" Garrett III; Durron Butler; Penny Ford; Benito Benites
- Producers: Benito Benitez; John "Virgo" Garrett III

Snap! singles chronology
"Cult of Snap" (1990)	"Mary Had a Little Boy" (1990)	"Megamix" (1991)

Music video
- "Mary Had a Little Boy" on YouTube

"Mary Had a Little Boy" is a song by German Eurodance group Snap!, released in November 1990 by Ariola, BMG and Logic Records as the fourth and final single from their debut studio album, World Power (1990). The song features vocals by American singer Penny Ford, who also co-wrote the lyrics, and reached number one in Zimbabwe and on the Canadian RPM Dance chart. Its lyrics are based on the nineteenth century nursery rhyme, Mary Had a Little Lamb. The chorus includes the line "Mary had a little boy, little did she know; and everywhere that Mary went, the little boy was sure to go". The music video for the song was directed by James Hudson and filmed in London. The song was re-recorded and included on their 2003 remix album The Cult of Snap! featuring Milky & 2NF.

== Critical reception ==
AllMusic editor Andrew Hamilton stated that Penny Ford's "telling vocal and the story line" on the song make it "the most accessible cut" on the World Power album. Larry Flick from Billboard magazine complimented it as a "fairly appealing hip-houser". Push from Melody Maker viewed it as "funky". Another Melody Maker editor, Andrew Smith, described it as "pure European house", "acceptable, if rather bland". Pan-European magazine Music & Media declared it as an "irresistable, [sic] nervous dance track based on a wicked, sticking tune." James Hamilton from Music Week called it a nursery rhyme paraphrasing singalong". Timmy Mallett reviewed the song for Smash Hits, commenting, "This is really good." He added, "It's the sort of record I'd dance to, but it does sound as though they're scraping the barrel by doing what is basically a nursery rhyme."

== Chart performance ==
"Mary Had a Little Boy" peaked at number one in Zimbabwe and on the RPM Dance chart in Canada. In Europe, it peaked within the top 10 in Austria, Belgium, Finland, Germany, Ireland, Luxembourg, the Netherlands, Spain, Sweden, Switzerland and the United Kingdom. In the latter country, the single reached number eight during its third week on the UK Singles Chart, on 16 December 1990. Additionally, it entered the top 20 in Italy, reaching number 19. In the United States, "Mary Had a Little Boy" charted on the Billboard Dance Club Play chart, peaking at number four. In New Zealand and Australia, it peaked at numbers 13 and 18, respectively.

== Music video ==
A music video was released to promote the single. Filmed at Westway Studios in London, it was directed by James Hudson and produced by Nick Verden for Radar Films. The video received heavy rotation on MTV Europe in January 1991.

== Track listings ==
- 7-inch single (Logic 113 831)
1. "Mary Had a Little Boy" (radio edit) – 3:41
2. "Mary Had a Little Boy" (radio edit instrumental) – 3:41
- CD maxi (Logic 663 831)
1. "Mary Had a Little Boy" (radio edit) – 3:41
2. "Mary Had a Little Boy" (club edit) – 5:56
3. "Believe the Hype" (US edit) – 6:25
- German Remix CD (Logic 613 852)
1. "Mary Had a Little Boy" (12-inch mix) – 8:12
2. "Mary Had a Little Boy" (Red Zone mix) – 6:43
3. "Mary Had a Little Boy" (7-inch radio edit) – 3:55

== Charts ==
=== Weekly charts ===
Chart (1990–1991)	Peak position
Australia (ARIA)	18
Austria (Ö3 Austria Top 40)	9
Belgium (Ultratop 50 Flanders)	7
Canada Dance/Urban (RPM)	1
Europe (Eurochart Hot 100)	4
Europe (European Hit Radio)	13
Finland (Suomen virallinen lista)	5
Germany (GfK)	4
Ireland (IRMA)	10
Israel (Israeli Singles Chart)	5
Italy (Musica e dischi)	19
Luxembourg (Radio Luxembourg)	6
Netherlands (Dutch Top 40)	2
Netherlands (Single Top 100)	3
New Zealand (Recorded Music NZ)	13
Quebec (ADISQ)	23
Spain (AFYVE)	6
Sweden (Sverigetopplistan)	7
Switzerland (Schweizer Hitparade)	4
UK Singles (Official Charts)	8
US 12-inch Singles Sales (Billboard)	20
US Dance Club Play (Billboard)	4
Zimbabwe (ZIMA)	1

=== Year-end charts ===
Chart (1991)	Position
Australia (ARIA)	100
Belgium (Ultratop 50 Flanders)	70
Europe (Eurochart Hot 100)	43
Europe (European Hit Radio)	99
Germany (Media Control)	35
Netherlands (Dutch Top 40)	49
Netherlands (Single Top 100)	92
Sweden (Topplistan)	51
US Dance Club Play (Billboard)	30

== Release history ==
Region	Date	Format(s)	Label(s)	Ref.
Europe	26 November 1990	7-inch vinyl; 12-inch vinyl; CD	Ariola; BMG; Logic	
United Kingdom	26 November 1990	7-inch vinyl; 12-inch vinyl; CD; cassette	Arista; BMG; Logic	
Australia	11 February 1991	7-inch vinyl; 12-inch vinyl; cassette	Ariola; RCA; Logic	
Japan	21 February 1991	Mini-CD	Ariola; BMG; Logic	

== See also ==
- List of RPM number-one dance singles of 1991
