= Rame (song) =

1996 song by Snap!

Single by Snap!

from the album Welcome to Tomorrow
- B-side: "Remix"
- Released: February 1996
- Recorded: 1994
- Genre: Downtempo; ethnic; trance; Eurohouse (remix)
- Length: 3:54
- Label: Ariola; Arista; BMG
- Songwriters: John "Virgo" Garrett III; Benito Benites
- Producer: Snap!

Snap! singles chronology
"The World in My Hands" (1995)	"Rame" (1996)	"The Power '96" (1996)

Music video
- "Rame" on YouTube

"Rame" is a 1996 song by German Eurodance project Snap!, released in February 1996, by Ariola, Arista and BMG, as the fourth and final single from their third studio album, Welcome to Tomorrow (1994). It features vocals by Indian vocalist Neela Ravindra credited under the alias "Rukmani", and was a top-30 hit in the Netherlands and Belgium and a top-40 hit in Austria, Germany and Sweden. The accompanying music video was directed by Angel Gracia, who had previously directed several videos for Snap!.

== Critical reception ==
Alan Jones from Music Week wrote, "The most consistent Euro act of the past few years, Snap! are back with the oddly-titled 'Rame', an excellent song on which they venture into the ethnic dance arena inhabited by Deep Forest and Enigma. A throbbing dance beat overlaid with softer tones provide the backing to a wailing exotic female vocalist. A deserved hit." James Hyman from the Record Mirror Dance Update gave it a score of four out of five. He added, "Well-layered and exceedingly well-produced slice of Teutonic trance with Eastern wailing residing harmoniously over a fast bpm-ed backing and 'Moments in Love'-ish notes. The slomo version could practically pass as an 'Im Nin' Alu' for the Nineties and a mix from Resistance D toughens everything into dubby hard Euro-house. Already doing well around Europe, this deserves to succeed."

== Track listing ==
- 7" single, Germany (1996)
1. "Rame" (Original Version) – 3:54
2. "Rame" (Slomo Version) – 4:01
- 12", Germany (1996)
1. "Rame" (12" Extended) – 5:50
2. "Rame" (Resistance D. Remix) – 7:22
- CD single, Germany (1996)
1. "Rame" (Original Version) – 3:54
2. "Rame" (Slomo Version) – 4:01
- CD single, UK (1996)
1. "Rame" (Original Version) – 3:57
2. "Rame" (Slomo Version) – 4:04
3. "Rame" (Resistance D. Remix) – 7:20
4. "Rame" (80% Stereo Mix) – 6:17
- CD maxi, Germany (1996)
1. "Rame" (Original Version) – 3:54
2. "Rame" (Slomo Version) – 4:01
3. "Rame" (Resistance D. Remix) – 7:22
4. "Rame" (80% Stereo Mix) – 6:17

== Charts ==
Chart (1996)	Peak position
Austria (Ö3 Austria Top 40)	34
Belgium (Ultratop 50 Flanders)	24
Europe (Eurochart Hot 100)	65
Europe (European Dance Radio)	11
Germany (GfK)	34
Israel (Israeli Singles Chart)	2
Netherlands (Dutch Top 40)	28
Netherlands (Single Top 100)	28
Scotland (OCC)	72
Sweden (Sverigetopplistan)	40
UK Singles (OCC)	50
UK Club Chart (Music Week)	21
