= World Power =

Studio album by Snap!
- Released: 15 May 1990
- Genres: House; Eurodance; hip house
- Length: 52:53
- Label: Logic
- Producer: Snap!

Snap! chronology
World Power (1990)	The Madman's Return (1992)

Singles from World Power
- 1. "The Power" Released: 3 January 1990; 2. "Ooops Up" Released: 1 May 1990; 3. "Cult of Snap" Released: 10 September 1990; 4. "Mary Had a Little Boy" Released: 10 December 1990

World Power is the debut album by German-American Eurodance project Snap!, released in May 1990 by Logic Records. The album received generally positive reviews from music critics, as the project's musical style and its vocalists, Turbo B and Penny Ford, were well received. It also achieved considerable commercial success with the help of four international top-ten hits, including its best-selling single "The Power".

== Reception ==
=== Commercial performance ===
The album reached number seven on Germany's Media Control Charts, number 25 on Australia's ARIA Charts, number four on the Ö3 Austria Top 40, number 20 on the Topplistan chart in Sweden, number four on the Swiss Music Charts, number 10 on the UK Albums Chart, and number 30 on the US Billboard 200 chart. Although it did not chart on the Dutch MegaCharts, it earned gold certification from the NVPI, for sales in excess of 50,000 copies in the Netherlands. World Power has also been certified gold in Australia, Austria, Sweden, the United Kingdom, and the United States, while it has received platinum certifications in both Germany and Switzerland. Worldwide, the album sold in excess of 5 million copies as of June 1992.

=== Critical response ===
Professional ratings
Review scores
Source	Rating
AllMusic	3/5 stars
Chicago Tribune	3/4 stars
Encyclopedia of Popular Music	2/5 stars
Entertainment Weekly	A−
laut.de	3/5 stars
Melody Maker	(favorable)
Select	1/5
The Village Voice	A−

Upon its release, World Power received generally positive reviews from music critics. Chicago Tribune writer Mitchell May called it "a dance record you can listen to", noting that "pulsating synth chords, slashing guitar riffs, thundering drums and the gospel-like wails of Penny Ford combine to give Snap a riveting sound". Greg Sandow of Entertainment Weekly called the album "smart dance/rap, full of surprises", giving it an "A−". Robert Christgau also gave World Power an A− rating in his consumer guide for The Village Voice. indicating "the kind of garden-variety good record that is the great luxury of musical micromarketing and overproduction. Anyone open to its aesthetic will enjoy more than half its tracks". Christgau noted it as "in the great transcultural Technotronic tradition" and described its music as "crazy and radio-ready at the same time. Also funny". In a retrospective review, AllMusic writer Andrew Hamilton perceived rapper Turbo B's enunciation as a flaw, but commended his "energy" and singer Penny Ford's vocals.

== Track listing ==
All tracks are written by Benito Benites (Michael Münzing), John Virgo Garrett III (Luca Anzilotti) and Durron Butler, unless otherwise specified.

No.	Title	Writer(s)	Length
1.	"The Power"	B.Benites, J.Garrett, D.Butler	5:44
2.	"Ooops Up"	Benites, Garrett, Butler, Penny Ford, Lonnie Simmons, Rudy Taylor, Charlie Wilson, Robert Wilson, Ronnie Wilson	6:42
3.	"Cult of Snap"		5:21
4.	"Believe the Hype"		4:50
5.	"I'm Gonna Get You (To Whom It May Concern)"		5:20
6.	"Witness the Strength"		4:57
7.	"Mary Had a Little Boy"	Benites, Garrett, Butler, Penny Ford	4:53
8.	"Blasé Blasé"		4:30

Reissue bonus tracks
No.	Title	Writer(s)	Length
9.	"Only Human"	Butler	3:11
10.	"The Power (Jungle Fever Mix)"	Benites, C., Garrett	7:23

== Personnel ==
- Artwork – Ariola-Studios, Tom
- Lyrics – Durron Butler (tracks: 3 to 10)
- Lyrics – Penny Ford (tracks: 2 and 7, and the single version of track 3)
- Music – Benito Benites, John "Virgo" Garrett III
- Original sound – Master Musikproduktion GmbH
- Photography – Markus Löffel
- Producer – Snap!

== Charts ==
=== Weekly charts ===
Chart (1990)	Peak position
Australian Albums (ARIA)	25
Austrian Albums (Ö3 Austria)	4
Canada Top Albums/CDs (RPM)	12
Dutch Albums (Album Top 100)	11
Finnish Albums (Suomen virallinen lista)	31
German Albums (Offizielle Top 100)	7
New Zealand Albums (RMNZ)	2
Swedish Albums (Sverigetopplistan)	20
Swiss Albums (Schweizer Hitparade)	4
UK Albums (Official Charts)	10
US Billboard 200	30

=== Year-end charts ===
Chart (1990)	Position
Austrian Albums (Ö3 Austria)	11
Canada Top Albums/CDs (RPM)	54
Dutch Albums (Album Top 100)	52
German Albums (Offizielle Top 100)	30
Swiss Albums (Schweizer Hitparade)	10
US Billboard 200	80

Chart (1991)	Position
German Albums (Offizielle Top 100)	68
New Zealand Albums (RMNZ)	38

Singles — Billboard (United States)

Year	Single	Chart	Position
1990	"The Power"	The Billboard Hot 100	2
1990	"The Power"	Hot Rap Singles	1
1990	"The Power"	Hot R&B Singles	4
1990	"The Power"	Hot Dance Music/Club Play	1
1990	"Ooops Up"	The Billboard Hot 100	35
1990	"Ooops Up"	Hot Rap Singles	3
1990	"Ooops Up"	Hot R&B Singles	18
1990	"Ooops Up"/"Believe the Hype"	Hot Dance Music/Club Play	4
1991	"Mary Had a Little Boy"	Hot R&B Singles	56
1991	"Mary Had a Little Boy"	Hot Dance Music/Club Play	4

== Certifications and sales ==
Certifications for World Power
Region	Certification	Certified units/sales
Austria (IFPI Austria)	Gold	25,000^{*}
Germany (BVMI)	Platinum	1,000,000
Netherlands (NVPI)	Gold	50,000^{^}
New Zealand (RMNZ)	Gold	7,500^{^}
Spain (Promusicae)	Platinum	100,000^{^}
Sweden (GLF)	Gold	50,000^{^}
Switzerland (IFPI Switzerland)	Platinum	50,000^{^}
United Kingdom (BPI)	Gold	100,000^{^}
United States (RIAA)	Gold	500,000^{^}
^{*} Sales figures based on certification alone.^{^} Shipments figures based on certification alone.
