= Ooops Up =

1990 single by Snap!

Single by Snap!

from the album World Power
- Released: 4 June 1990
- Genre: Eurodance; funk; hip-hop
- Length: 6:43 (album version); 3:57 (radio edit)
- Label: Logic
- Songwriters: John "Virgo" Garrett III; Lonnie Simmons; Durron Butler; Penny Ford; Charlie Wilson; Benito Benites; Rudy Taylor; Ronnie Wilson; The Gap Band
- Producers: Benito Benitez; John "Virgo" Garrett III

Snap! singles chronology
"The Power" (1990)	"Ooops Up" (1990)	"Cult of Snap" (1990)

Music video
- "Ooops Up" on YouTube

2003 cover
- 2003 version

"Ooops Up" is a song by German Eurodance group Snap! featuring American rapper Turbo B and American singer Penny Ford, released in June 1990 by Logic Records as the second single from the group's debut studio album, World Power (1990). The song is a re-working of "I Don't Believe You Want to Get Up and Dance (Ooops!)", a 1980 hit by the Gap Band, with whom Ford was a former backing singer. The single was a worldwide hit and reached number one in Greece and on the Canadian RPM Dance chart. Its accompanying music video was directed by Liam Kan.

== Critical reception ==
AllMusic editor Andrew Hamilton noted that the song is a "remake/takeoff" of the Gap Band's nonsensical funk riff "Oops Upside Your Head". Bill Coleman from Billboard magazine commented, "Sizzling hip-hop jam should help act maintain 'the power' over club and radio jocks." Dave Sholin from the Gavin Report wrote that "reaching into The Gap Band songbook, this powerhouse outfit comes up with the perfect remake, giving it a glowing nineties treatment." Push from Melody Maker remarked that the song "was an attempt at something a little different" than sticking around with the same formula as "The Power". Another MM editor, Andrew Smith, called it "juddery funk".

David Giles from Music Week felt it has "a shuffling rhythm distinctive enough to earn them another big success." Gene Sandbloom from The Network Forty described it as a "powerful bass busting track combining rap and song. Already one of the most danced to songs in the country." A reviewer from Newcastle Evening Chronicle named "Ooops Up" one of the best songs of the World Power album. Tom Doyle from Smash Hits declared it as "one of the best attempts" in matching the brilliance of their debut, "The Power". He called it "a sort of cover of the Gap Band's 'Ooops Upside Your Head' mixed with a dodgy reinterpretation of 'Little Miss Muffet'."

The closing lines about "Little Miss Muffet" were actually an ad-lib by singer Penny Ford when recording the song. Ford was unhappy with her vocal performance in the previous part of the track so began messing around so that recording wouldn’t be used. However, the producers loved it and kept Ford’s ad-lib in the track. The "Little Miss Muffet" lines are loosely based on lyrics from the George Clinton track "Let’s Take it to the Stage".

== Chart performance ==
"Ooops Up" peaked at number-one in Greece and it reached number two in Austria, the Netherlands, Norway, Sweden, Switzerland and West Germany. It also became a top-10 hit in Belgium, Denmark, Finland, Italy, Luxembourg, Spain and the United Kingdom. In the latter country, the single peaked at number five during its third week on the UK Singles Chart, on 24 June 1990. It stayed at that position for two weeks. Outside Europe, "Ooops Up" reached number one on the RPM Dance/Urban chart in Canada. In West Asia, it became a successful top-five hit, peaking at number two on 15 July 1990. In Oceania, it peaked at numbers four and eight in Australia and New Zealand, respectively. In Africa, the song reached number five in Zimbabwe, while in the US, it peaked at number 35 on the Billboard Hot 100 and number four on the Billboard Dance Club Play chart.

The song was awarded with a gold record in Australia (35,000), Austria (25,000), Sweden (25,000) and the US (500,000) and a silver record in the United Kingdom (200,000).

== Music video ==
The music video for "Ooops Up" was directed by Liam Kan and filmed in London in both black-and-white and colours. He would also direct the video for the group's next song, "Cult of Snap".

== Track listings ==
- 12-inch maxi
1. "Ooops Up" (Vocal) – 6:17
2. "Ooops Up" (Other Mix) – 6:40
3. "Ooops Up" (Instrumental) – 5:33
- 7-inch single
1. "Ooops Up" (Vocal Edit) – 3:57
2. "Ooops Up" (Instrumental Edit) – 3:57
- CD single
1. "Ooops Up" (Edit) – 3:59
2. "Ooops Up" (Vocal Version) – 6:17
3. "Ooops Up" (Other Mix) – 6:40
- CD maxi version
1. "Ooops Up" (Vocal Edit) – 3:57
2. "Ooops Up" (Vocal 12-inch Mix) – 6:17
3. "Ooops Up" (Other Mix) – 6:40
- 2003 version (Snap feat. NG3)
1. "Ooops Up!" (Radio Edit) – 3:20
2. "Ooops Up!" (Extended Club Mix) – 4:03
3. "Ooops Up!" (Oops Up 90) – 4:00

== Charts ==
=== Weekly charts ===
Original version

Chart (1990)	Peak position
Australia (ARIA)	4
Austria (Ö3 Austria Top 40)	2
Belgium (Ultratop 50 Flanders)	4
Canada Top Singles (RPM)	89
Canada Dance/Urban (RPM)	1
Denmark (IFPI)	10
Europe (Eurochart Hot 100)	2
Finland (Suomen virallinen lista)	3
France (SNEP)	34
Greece (IFPI)	1
Ireland (IRMA)	15
Israel (Israeli Singles Chart)	2
Italy (Musica e dischi)	3
Luxembourg (Radio Luxembourg)	3
Netherlands (Dutch Top 40)	2
Netherlands (Single Top 100)	2
New Zealand (Recorded Music NZ)	8
Norway (VG-lista)	2
Quebec (ADISQ)	28
Spain (AFYVE)	6
Sweden (Sverigetopplistan)	2
Switzerland (Schweizer Hitparade)	2
UK Singles (Official Charts)	5
UK Club Chart (Record Mirror)	1
US Billboard Hot 100	35
US 12-inch Singles Sales (Billboard) with "Believe the Hype"	12
US Dance Club Play (Billboard) with "Believe the Hype"	4
US Hot R&B Singles (Billboard)	18
US Hot Rap Singles (Billboard)	3
US Cash Box Top 100	41
West Germany (GfK)	2
Zimbabwe (ZIMA)	5

"Ooops Up 2003"

Chart (2003)	Peak position
Germany (GfK)	69
Sweden (Sverigetopplistan)	40

=== Year-end charts ===
Original version

Chart (1990)	Position
Australia (ARIA)	53
Austria (Ö3 Austria Top 40)	4
Belgium (Ultratop 50 Flanders)	23
Canada Dance/Urban (RPM)	5
Europe (Eurochart Hot 100)	10
Germany (Media Control)	5
Netherlands (Dutch Top 40)	21
Netherlands (Single Top 100)	16
New Zealand (RIANZ)	23
Sweden (Topplistan)	16
Switzerland (Schweizer Hitparade)	8
UK Singles (OCC)	33
UK Club Chart (Record Mirror)	21

=== Decade-end charts ===
Original version

Chart (1990–1999)	Position
Austria (Ö3 Austria Top 40)	80

== Certifications ==
Region	Certification	Certified units/sales
Australia (ARIA)	Gold	35,000^{^}
Austria (IFPI Austria)	Gold	25,000^{*}
Sweden (GLF)	Gold	25,000^{^}
United Kingdom (BPI)	Silver	200,000^{^}
United States (RIAA)	Gold	500,000^{^}
^{*} Sales figures based on certification alone.^{^} Shipments figures based on certification alone.

== Release history ==
Region	Version	Date	Format(s)	Label(s)	Ref.
Germany	Original	4 June 1990	7-inch vinyl; 12-inch vinyl; CD	Logic	
United Kingdom	Original	4 June 1990	7-inch vinyl; 12-inch vinyl; cassette	Arista	
United Kingdom	Original	11 June 1990	CD	Arista	
United Kingdom	Original	18 June 1990	12-inch remix vinyl	Arista	
Australia	Original	6 August 1990	7-inch vinyl; 12-inch vinyl; cassette	Ariola; Logic	
Australia	2003 remix	3 November 2003	CD	Ministry of Sound	
