= The Power (Snap! song) =

1990 song by Snap!

Single by Snap!

from the album World Power
- Released: 3 January 1990
- Genre: Eurodance; hip house; techno
- Length: 5:45 (album version); 3:47 (single version)
- Label: Logic
- Songwriters: Benito Benites; John "Virgo" Garrett III; Toni C.
- Producer: Snap!

Snap! singles chronology
"The Power" (1990)	"Ooops Up" (1990)

Music video
- "The Power" on YouTube

"The Power" is a song by German Eurodance group Snap! featuring American rapper Turbo B and American singer Penny Ford, and released as the group's debut single. It was released on 3 January 1990 by Logic Records as the lead single from their debut studio album, World Power (1990). The song was both written and produced by the group and reached number one in Greece, Israel, Luxembourg, the Netherlands, Spain, Switzerland, the United Kingdom and Zimbabwe. In the United States, it topped three Billboard charts and peaked at number two on the Billboard Hot 100. The accompanying music video was directed by The Molotov Brothers. In 2022, Rolling Stone magazine featured it in their list of the "200 Greatest Dance Songs of All Time".

== Background ==
Written and produced by Michael Münzing and Luca Anzilotti (under the pseudonyms Benito Benites and John "Virgo" Garrett III), "The Power" went through several renditions. The original version was released on 3 January 1990 through Logic Records in Germany and contains samples from "Let the Words Flow" by Chill Rob G, "Love's Gonna Get You" by Jocelyn Brown, and "King of the Beats" by Mantronix. Despite it becoming an early 1990 hit in Germany and appearing on the Dance Singles chart in the UK, none of the credited vocals were cleared, and Stu Fine, former owner of Wild Pitch Records, wanted to release the song in the United States. Rob G, who was signed to Wild Pitch, consented, initially thinking the deal could be lucrative for his career. Wild Pitch issued a stateside single and video with his lyrics from "Let the Words Flow" on 5 March 1990. However, this version was credited under Power Jam and not Snap!.

Simultaneously, Arista Records wished to release their own edition in the US, but because it was not legally possible for the label to simply reissue the original German single, it was decided to re-record the entire track with new lyrics by rapper Durron Butler, known as Turbo B, and additional vocals by Penny Ford. The samples were then all legally cleared and the song was finally re-released under the new name Snap! on 12 March 1990 in the UK and 6 April 1990 in the US, despite the fact that Jocelyn Brown had commenced legal action because of the unauthorized sampling of her vocals.

This song is written in the key of B minor, and opens with the spoken Russian "Американская фирма Transceptor Technology приступила к производству компьютеров „Персональный спутник" (meaning "The American company Transceptor Technology has started production of the 'Personal Companion' computer"). "Personal Companion" was a computer-like device for the blind and visually impaired. Released in 1990, it was controlled by voice and could, among other functions, automatically download articles from USA Today by a built-in modem. It was made by Transceptor Technologies of Ann Arbor, Michigan.

== Critical reception ==
Bill Coleman from Billboard magazine wrote, "Thanks to a healthy buzz generated via underground import attention, this hypnotic, street-soul jam should have no trouble duplicating its smash U.K. success. Expect big crossover action." Ernest Hardy from Cash Box noted that the song is "set against a basic hip-hop beat, but all sorts of computer-generated enhancements are added, as well as a great bassline, soul-drenched female vocals, a male rap that sounds a bit like Heavy D, and, depending on the mix, elements of house. Yet none of it seems forced or contrived, and it doesn't sound quite like anything else that's out there right now. This one will be huge." Complex magazine described it as "a more industrial take on the hip-house scene that blew up" at that time the song was released.

Tom Ewing of Freaky Trigger remarked that the song "juggles aggression and melancholy, and makes both immediately appealing – the juddering riff which opens "The Power" set against the slow pace and lonesome spaciousness of the production and Pennye Ford's vocals. The riff is more distinctive than the singing, to be honest, but the contrast works." Pan-European magazine Music & Media commented that a "funky hip-hop rhythm, sampled from Doug Lazy's 'Let It Roll' has been matched with some forceful rapping by Turbo B and inspired gospel vocals on the chorus. Excellent warm production by Benito Benites, John Garrett III and Snap. Could be the next big thing from the Continent." A reviewer from The Network Forty described it as "a very hip and cool" rap song, "with a modern edge". The magazine also added that the "power charged rap-dance" does "crackles and pops with enough irresistible energy".

== Chart performance ==
"The Power" peaked at number one on both the Canadian RPM Dance/Urban chart and the US Billboard Dance Club Play chart. In Europe, the single peaked at number one in Greece, Luxembourg, the Netherlands, Spain, Switzerland and the United Kingdom, as well as on the Eurochart Hot 100. In the UK, it topped the UK Singles Chart during the weeks of 25 March and 1 April 1990. Additionally, "The Power" made it into the top 10 also in Austria, Belgium, Finland, Ireland, Italy, Norway, Portugal, Sweden and West Germany. Outside Europe, it peaked at number-one in Israel and Zimbabwe, number two on both the Billboard Hot 100 and the Cash Box Top 100 in the US, number six in New Zealand and number 13 in Australia. The single earned a gold record in Australia, Germany, the Netherlands, Sweden and Switzerland, as well as a silver record in the UK. In Spain and the US, it was awarded with a platinum record.

== Impact and legacy ==
"The Power" was awarded an ASCAP R&B award in 1990 and also won the ASCAP Pop award in the category Most Played Song of 1991. In 2010, Pitchfork included the song in their list of "Ten Actually Good 90s Jock Jams". In 2017, BuzzFeed ranked it number 38 in their list of "The 101 Greatest Dance Songs of the '90s". In 2019, Billboard magazine ranked it number 179 in their "Billboard's Top Songs of the '90s". In July 2020, digital publication The Pudding carried out a study on the most iconic songs from the '90s and songs that are most known by Millennials and the people of Generation Z. "The Power" was the seventh song with the highest recognisability rate. In 2022, Classic Pop ranked it number three in their list of the top 40 dance tracks from the 90's, while Rolling Stone ranked it number 188 in their "200 Greatest Dance Songs of All Time". In 2023, Time Out ranked it number 19 in their "The 100 Best Party Songs Ever Made". In 2024, Billboard ranked "The Power" number 59 in their "The 100 Greatest Jock Jams of All Time", writing, "Definitive early ’90s techno-rap, digestible as an iconic four-word soundbite."

== Track listings ==
=== 1990 version ===
- 12-inch maxi
1. "The Power" (Ful mix) (6:00)
2. "The Power" (Switch mix) (6:21)
3. "The Power" (Potential mix) (5:42)
- 7-inch single
1. "The Power" (3:47)
2. "The Power" (dub) (5:35)
- CD version
1. "The Power" (Ful mix) (6:00)
2. "The Power" (Jungle Fever mix) (7:23)
3. "The Power" (Potential mix) (5:42)
4. "The Power" (7-inch version) (3:44)

=== 1996 version ===
- CD version
1. "The Power '96" (Silk 7-inch) (3:53)
2. "The Power '96" (E=mc2 12-inch) (6:44)
3. "The Power '96" (original dub 12-inch) (4:57)
4. "Ex-Terminator" (From the Class 'X) (5:21)

== Charts ==
=== Weekly charts ===
Original version

Chart (1990-1991)	Peak position
Australia (ARIA)	13
Austria (Ö3 Austria Top 40)	3
Belgium (Ultratop 50 Flanders)	3
Canada Top Singles (RPM)	16
Canada Dance/Urban (RPM)	1
Europe (Eurochart Hot 100)	1
Finland (Suomen virallinen lista)	3
France (SNEP)	15
Greece (IFPI)	1
Ireland (IRMA)	5
Israel (Israeli Singles Chart)	1
Italy (Musica e dischi)	3
Italy Airplay (Music & Media)	5
Luxembourg (Radio Luxembourg)	1
Netherlands (Dutch Top 40)	1
Netherlands (Single Top 100)	1
New Zealand (Recorded Music NZ)	6
Norway (VG-lista)	3
Portugal (AFP)	10
Quebec (ADISQ)	20
Spain (AFYVE)	1
Sweden (Sverigetopplistan)	3
Switzerland (Schweizer Hitparade)	1
UK Singles (Official Charts)	1
UK Dance (Music Week)	1
US Billboard Hot 100	2
US 12-inch Singles Sales (Billboard)	1
US Dance Club Play (Billboard)	1
US Hot Black Singles (Billboard)	4
US Hot Rap Singles (Billboard)	1
US Cash Box Top 100	2
West Germany (GfK)	2
Zimbabwe (ZIMA)	1

"The Power '96"

Chart (1996)	Peak position
Finland (Suomen virallinen lista)	12
Netherlands (Dutch Top 40 Tipparade)	11
Netherlands (Dutch Single Tip)	5
Sweden (Sverigetopplistan)	40
UK Pop Tip Club Chart (Music Week)	1

=== Year-end charts ===
Chart (1990)	Position
Australia (ARIA)	65
Austria (Ö3 Austria Top 40)	13
Belgium (Ultratop 50 Flanders)	27
Canada Dance/Urban (RPM)	3
Europe (Eurochart Hot 100)	3
Germany (Media Control)	4
Israel (Israeli Singles Chart)	7
Netherlands (Dutch Top 40)	7
Netherlands (Single Top 100)	5
New Zealand (RIANZ)	9
Sweden (Topplistan)	13
Switzerland (Schweizer Hitparade)	9
UK Singles (OCC)	10
UK Club Chart (Record Mirror)	9
US Billboard Hot 100	26
US 12-inch Singles Sales (Billboard)	4
US Dance Club Play (Billboard)	2
US Hot R&B Singles (Billboard)	48
US Hot Rap Singles (Billboard)	4
US Cash Box Top 100	31

== Certifications ==
Region	Certification	Certified units/sales
Australia (ARIA)	Gold	35,000^{^}
Germany (BVMI)	Gold	250,000^{^}
Netherlands (NVPI)	Gold	75,000^{^}
Spain (Promusicae)	Platinum	50,000^{^}
Sweden (GLF)	Gold	25,000^{^}
Switzerland (IFPI Switzerland)	Gold	25,000^{^}
United Kingdom (BPI)	Silver	200,000^{^}
United States (RIAA)	Platinum	1,000,000^{^}
^{^} Shipments figures based on certification alone.

== Release history ==
Region	Date	Format(s)	Label(s)	Ref.
Germany	3 January 1990	7-inch vinyl; 12-inch vinyl; CD	Logic	
United Kingdom	12 March 1990	7-inch vinyl; 12-inch vinyl; CD	Arista	
United Kingdom	19 March 1990	Cassette	Arista	
United Kingdom	9 April 1990	12-inch remix vinyl	Arista	
Australia	14 May 1990	7-inch vinyl; 12-inch vinyl; cassette	Ariola; Logic	

== Covers, samples and remixes ==
The song was covered in 2002 by H-Blockx. Turbo B featured in the song taking turns to rap lyrics with H-Blockx's then frontman Dave Gappa. Of note, Turbo B replaces the word 'Snap!' with 'H-blockx' in the line "If they are Snap! don't need the police to try to save them". The single charted at number 48 in Germany, number 51 in Austria and number 34 in Australia. In Australia, this version was used to promote the Seven Network's coverage of the 2002 Commonwealth Games.

In 2003, Snap! and Turbo B. collaborated with Motivo for "The Power (Of Bhangra)" remix.

In 2026, Billy Strings performed the song, singing both vocal parts while dressed as He-Man from Masters of the Universe, at the “Heartbeat of Eternia” Halloween show at the CFG Bank Arena in Baltimore MD.

== See also ==
- List of Billboard number-one rap singles of the 1980s and 1990s
- List of Dutch Top 40 number-one singles of 1990
- List of European number-one hits of 1990
- List of number-one singles of 1990 (Spain)
- List of number-one singles of the 1990s (Switzerland)
- List of number-one dance singles of 1990 (U.S.)
- List of RPM number-one dance singles of 1990
- List of UK Singles Chart number ones of the 1990s
- Techno Mart tremors caused by resonant frequency matching "The Power"
