= Snap! =

German Eurodance group

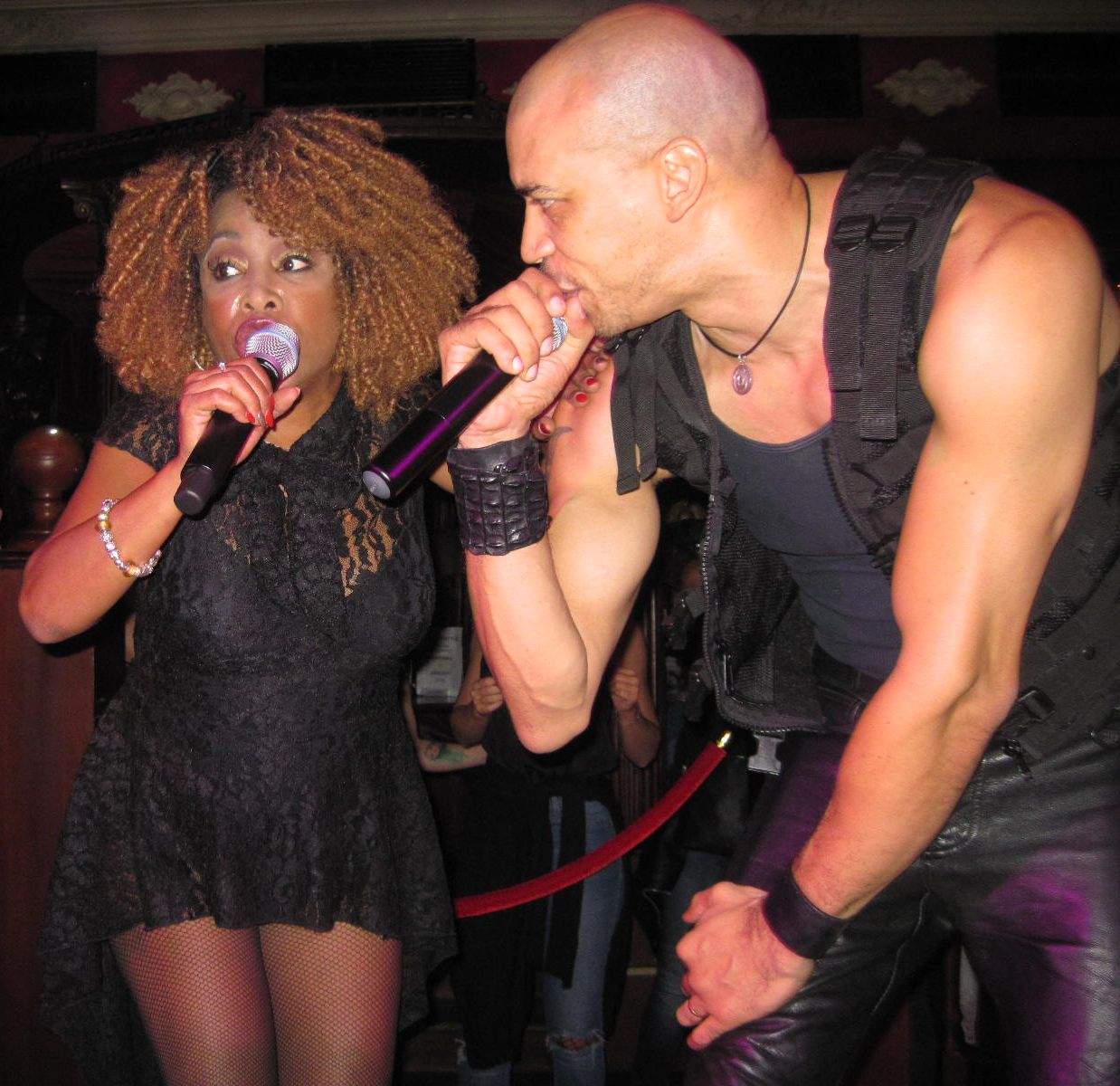
- Penny Ford and Stoli Michaels, 2017

Background information
- Origin: Frankfurt, Germany
- Genres: Eurodance; hip house; house
- Years active: 1989–1996; 2000–present
- Labels: Logic; Arista; Hard2Beat
- Members: Michael Münzing; Luca Anzilotti; Stoli Michaels; Penny Ford; Jesse Kolb
- Past members: Turbo B; Jackie Harris; Thea Austin; Niki Haris; Maxayn; Summer; Loc
- Website: Official website

Snap! is a German Eurodance group formed in 1989 by record producers Michael Münzing and Luca Anzilotti. The act has had several lineup changes over the years, featuring American singers, songwriters, and rappers such as Thea Austin, Turbo B, Niki Haris, and Penny Ford. Their most popular hits include "The Power" (1990) and "Rhythm Is a Dancer" (1992), both of which topped the charts in multiple countries.

== History ==
=== Previous projects ===
Luca Anzilotti and Michael Münzing began collaborating in 1985 in the group Off (Organisation for Fun), alongside Sven Väth. They recorded two albums, Organisation for Fun (1988) and Ask Yourself (1989), as well as a series of singles, including "Electrica Salsa", until 1990.

In 1986, the duo created the side project 16 BIT and found success with their first single, "Where Are You?" In 1987, they released the album Inaxycvgtgb for BMG.

=== Formation and first album: World Power ===
Anzilotti and Münzing officially formed Snap! in 1989, adopting the aliases Benito Benites and John "Virgo" Garrett III, as they believed the public harbored negative preconceived notions about German music. Their debut hit, "The Power", featuring the American rapper Turbo B and singer Penny Ford, peaked at No. 2 in Germany in April 1990 and remained in that position for five weeks, eventually earning Gold certification for sales of 250,000 units. The single topped the charts in the United Kingdom, earning a Silver award for sales of 200,000 units. In the U.S., it reached No. 2 on the Billboard Hot 100 and was certified Platinum for 1,000,000 units sold.

Jackie Harris was employed to mime Ford's vocals in "The Power" music video and left the group shortly thereafter, leading Ford to become the full-time lead singer. She recorded the second single, "Ooops Up", a reworking of "I Don't Believe You Want to Get Up and Dance (Ooops!)", a 1980 hit by the Gap Band, for which Ford had previously been a backing singer. "Ooops Up" also reached No. 2 in Germany, spending nine weeks in that position. The single entered the top five in the UK, earning another Silver award, and received Gold certification in the U.S. There were further hits, including the Middle Eastern-influenced "Cult of Snap", which reached No. 3 in Germany and No. 8 in the UK, and "Mary Had a Little Boy", which peaked at No. 4 in Germany and again No. 8 in the UK. The band's debut album, World Power, reached No. 7 in Germany, No. 10 in the UK, and No. 30 in the U.S. It achieved Platinum status in Germany and Gold in the UK and U.S.

=== Second album: The Madman's Return ===
In 1991, Thea Austin, an American singer, composer, songwriter, and dancer, joined Snap!'s lineup and contributed to the writing of the song "Rhythm Is a Dancer". The track was initially intended to be the lead single from the group's second album but was postponed, resulting in "Colour of Love" being released in its place. This single peaked at No. 9 in Germany but stalled at No. 54 in the UK. "Rhythm Is a Dancer", which sampled the 1984 song "Automan" by the American electronic hip hop band Newcleus, was eventually issued as the second single in July 1992. The song became Snap!'s biggest hit to date, reaching No. 1 in Germany, the UK, France, Switzerland, Austria, the Netherlands, and Belgium. In the U.S., it peaked at No. 5, earning a Gold certification for sales of 500,000 units. In Germany, the single achieved Platinum status for 500,000 units sold and received Gold certification in the UK for sales of 400,000 units. The third single, "Exterminate", charted at No. 3 in Germany and No. 2 in the UK, also earning a Gold certification in Germany.

The Madman's Return, Snap!'s second album, performed well in the charts, peaking at No. 3 in Germany and entering the top 10 in the UK, the Netherlands, Austria, and Switzerland. Around the time of its release, Turbo B left the project due to disagreements with the production duo. The album was certified Gold in Germany and the UK, with sales of 250,000 units and 100,000 units, respectively. Another single, titled "Do You See the Light", featuring Niki Haris, was also released.

=== Third album: Welcome to Tomorrow ===
Münzing and Anzilotti recruited Washington, D.C.-born singer Summer (Paula Brown) to front the act for their third album. Snap! shifted towards a progressive house sound and released the first single, titled "Welcome to Tomorrow (Are You Ready?)", in September 1994. The track peaked at No. 4 in Germany and No. 6 in the UK, and the album, also titled Welcome to Tomorrow followed. The second single, "The First the Last Eternity (Till the End)", achieved moderate success in the UK but reached No. 7 in Germany. Snap! released two more singles from the album: "The World in My Hands" and "Rame" (featuring Rukmani), both of which experienced moderate chart entries.

=== Breakup and return ===
In 1996, the group officially disbanded after releasing a greatest hits compilation titled Snap! Attack: The Best of Snap!. This album included new versions of their two biggest hits, "The Power '96" and "Rhythm Is a Dancer '96". The act made a comeback in 2000 with a track entitled "Gimme a Thrill", featuring rap lyrics performed by Turbo B and vocals from the band's newest singer, Maxayn. However, it did not garner much attention, peaking only at No. 11 in the German dance charts. A new album, titled One Day on Earth, was planned for release around this time but was never published.

In 2002, a new version of "Do You See the Light", remixed by Plaything, was released. The following year, a remix album titled The Cult of Snap! was issued, featuring reworked singles. "Rhythm Is a Dancer 2003" peaked at No. 7 in Germany and No. 17 in the UK, while "The Power (of Bhangra 2003)" achieved moderate success in Austria, Switzerland, and Denmark. Snap! also released a reworked version of "Oops Up!", featuring vocals by NG3, which entered the Swedish charts at No. 40 and the German top 100 singles chart at No. 69.

Buoyed by the success of the remixes, Münzing and Anzilotti returned to the studio with singer Damien Behanan, also known as Loc, and released the single "Beauty Queen" in September 2005 through Luma Music. This single peaked within the top 10 of the German dance charts but failed to enter the official charts. The band released another digital download single in 2008, featuring Loc, titled "Jumping!", but this also failed to chart. On 16 June 2008, a new version of "Rhythm Is a Dancer '08" was released as a CD single in the UK, peaking at No. 23. In 2018, the rights to all recordings of Snap!, previously owned by Münzing, were transferred to BMG Rights Management, an incarnation of BMG.

== Discography ==
- World Power (1990)
- The Madman's Return (1992)
- Welcome to Tomorrow (1994)

== See also ==
- List of artists who reached No. 1 on the US Dance chart
- Centory
