= Aaron Carter discography =

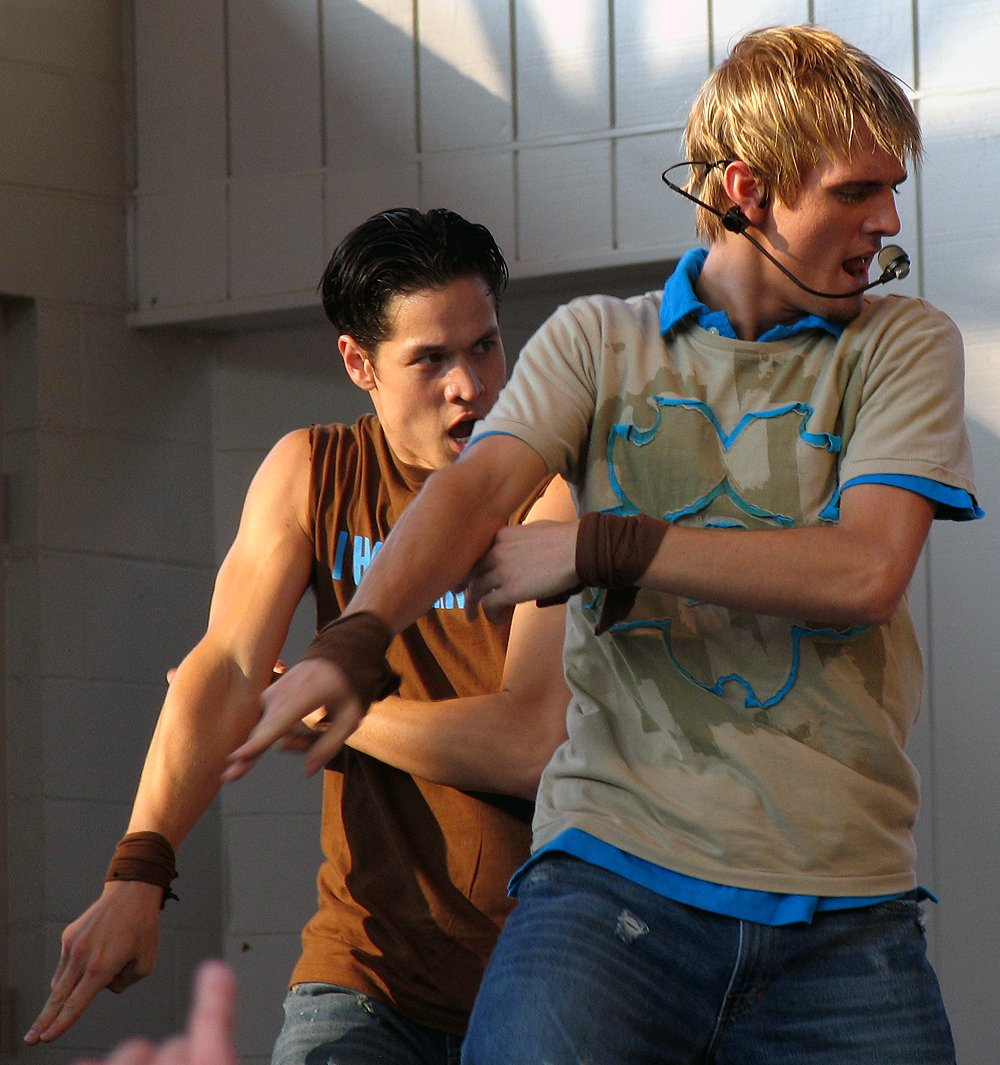
- Aaron Carter in concert in Birmingham, Alabama
- Studio albums: 7
- Extended plays: 3
- Compilation albums: 3
- Singles: 44
- DVDs: 4

American singer-songwriter Aaron Carter released seven studio albums (including two posthumously), three extended plays (EP), three compilation albums, five video albums and forty four singles (including five as a featured artist).

He sold more than 4 million albums in the United States, as of 2013, and more than 10 million records worldwide.

Aaron Carter released his debut single "Crush on You" in 1997, which was a top 10 in Australia, Germany and the United Kingdom. His self-titled debut album was released in the same year in Europe, and sold more than 1 million copies worldwide.

In 2000 Aaron signed with Jive Records and released three more studio albums; the first of them, Aaron's Party (Come Get It), was his most successful album, and sold more than three million copies in United States alone, being certified 3× Platinum by RIAA.

Carter released the EP Love in 2017 after fourteen years since his last album with new material; he followed this in 2018 with the full-length album of the same name.

== Albums ==
=== Studio albums ===
List of studio albums, with selected details, chart positions and certifications
Title	Album details	Peak chart positions										Certifications
Title	Album details	US	AUS	AUT	CAN	GER	NL	NOR	SWE	SWI	UK	Certifications
Aaron Carter	Released: December 1, 1997; Label: Edel	—	51	17	23	13	36	5	6	16	12	BVMI: Gold; GLF: Gold; MC: Gold
Aaron's Party (Come Get It)	Released: September 26, 2000; Label: Jive	4	97	—	54	82	76	—	57	—	—	RIAA: 3× Platinum; MC: Gold
Oh Aaron	Released: August 7, 2001; Label: Jive	7	—	—	33	—	—	—	—	—	—	RIAA: Platinum
Another Earthquake!	Released: September 3, 2002; Label: Jive	18	—	—	—	—	—	—	—	—	—	
Love	Released: February 16, 2018; Label: Z Music Entertainment	—	—	—	—	—	—	—	—	—	—	
Blacklisted	Released: November 7, 2022; Label: Rakkaus	—	—	—	—	—	—	—	—	—	—	
Recovery	Released: May 24, 2024; Label: Classic Modern Entertainment	—	—	—	—	—	—	—	—	—	—	
"—" denotes releases that did not chart or were not released in that country.

=== Compilations ===
List of compilation albums, with selected details
Title	Album details
Most Requested Hits	Released: November 4, 2003; Label: Jive
Come Get It: The Very Best of Aaron Carter	Released: January 17, 2006; Label: Jive
2 Good 2 B True	Released: February 28, 2006; Label: Sony

== Extended plays ==
List of extended plays, with selected details
Title	EP details
Surfin' USA	Released: March 23, 1999; Promotional EP for Aaron Carter
The Music Never Stopped	Released: February 24, 2015; 7-track EP, released digitally on Soundcloud
Love	Released: February 10, 2017; 5-track EP, released digitally on iTunes

== Singles ==
=== As lead artist ===
List of singles, with selected chart positions and certifications, showing year released and album name
Title	Year	Peak chart positions						Certifications	Album
Title	Year	US	AUS	GER	NL	SWE	UK	Certifications	Album
"Crush on You"	1997	—	9	5	25	18	9	ARIA: Gold; BVMI: Gold	Aaron Carter
"Crazy Little Party Girl"	1997	—	20	13	23	7	7		Aaron Carter
"I'm Gonna Miss You Forever"	1998	—	—	13	56	9	24		Aaron Carter
"Let the Music Heal Your Soul" (as part of Bravo All Stars)	1998	60	—	6	24	—	36		Non-album single
"Surfin' USA"	1998	—	—	18	—	51	18		Aaron Carter
"Shake It" (featuring 95 South)	1998	—	66	—	—	—	—		Aaron Carter
"Children of the World" (as part of Hand in Hand for Children)	1999	—	—	65	—	—	—		Non-album single
"Aaron's Party (Come Get It)"	2000	35	73	—	74	—	51	RIAA: Gold	Aaron's Party (Come Get It)
"I Want Candy"	2000	—	27	68	21	10	31		Aaron's Party (Come Get It)
"That's How I Beat Shaq"	2001	96	—	—	—	—	—		Aaron's Party (Come Get It)
"Oh Aaron" (featuring Nick Carter and No Secrets)	2001	—	—	—	—	—	—		Oh Aaron
"Not Too Young, Not Too Old" (featuring Nick Carter)	2001	—	80	—	—	—	—		Oh Aaron
"I'm All About You"	2001	—	—	—	—	—	—		Oh Aaron
"Leave It Up to Me"	2002	—	—	—	—	—	22		Jimmy Neutron: Boy Genius (Music from the Motion Picture) and Most Requested Hits
"Another Earthquake"	2002	—	—	—	—	—	—		Another Earthquake!
"Summertime" (featuring Baha Men)	2002	—	—	—	—	—	—		Another Earthquake!
"To All the Girls"	2002	—	—	—	—	—	—		Another Earthquake!
"Do You Remember"	2003	—	—	—	—	—	—		Another Earthquake!
"She Wants Me" (with Nick Carter)	2003	—	—	—	—	—	—		Most Requested Hits
"One Better"	2004	—	—	—	—	—	—		Most Requested Hits
"Saturday Night"	2005	—	—	—	—	—	—	RIAA: Gold	Popstar soundtrack
"Dance with Me" (featuring Flo Rida)	2009	—	—	—	—	—	—		Non-album singles
"Planet Rock" (featuring Busta Rhymes)	2010	—	—	—	—	—	—		Non-album singles
"Perfect Storm"	2010	—	—	—	—	—	—		Non-album singles
"Ooh Wee" (featuring Pat SoLo)	2014	—	—	—	—	—	—		Non-album singles
"Fool's Gold"	2016	—	—	—	—	—	—		Love
"Sooner or Later"	2017	—	—	—	—	—	—	FIMI: Gold	Love
"Don't Say Goodbye"	2017	—	—	—	—	—	—		Love
"Sensational Love x Kid Carter"	2019	—	—	—	—	—	—		Non-album singles
"Anything x Kid Carter"	2019	—	—	—	—	—	—		Non-album singles
"So Much to Say"	2021	—	—	—	—	—	—		Blacklisted
"Reload the Wesson" (featuring Twista)	2022	—	—	—	—	—	—		Blacklisted
"Demons" (with Rocky Luciano)	2022	—	—	—	—	—	—		Non-album single
"She Just Wanna Ride" (featuring 3D Friends)	2022	—	—	—	—	—	—		Blacklisted
"Blockbuster" (with Rocky Luciano)	2022	—	—	—	—	—	—		Non-album single
"Blame It on Me"	2022	—	—	—	—	—	—		Blacklisted
"Scars" (featuring 3D Friends)	2022	—	—	—	—	—	—		Blacklisted
"Recovery"	2024	—	—	—	—	—	—		Recovery

=== As featured artist ===
List of singles as featured artist, showing year released and album name
Title	Year	Album
"Every Little Step" (Play featuring Aaron Carter)	2004	Don't Stop the Music
"Heavy Heart" (Cali4nia Jones featuring Aaron Carter)	2017	Non-album singles
"Something to Fk With" (Check the Star featuring Aaron Carter)	2021	Non-album singles
"Breaking Stars" (Bassknight featuring Aaron Carter)	2022	Non-album singles
"All for Love" (Jeremy Syres featuring Aaron Carter)	2022	Non-album singles
"Lately" (Check the Star featuring Aaron Carter)	2022	Non-album singles
"Honest Man" (Check the Star featuring Aaron Carter)	2022	Non-album singles
"You Are the One" (Check the Star featuring Aaron Carter)	2023	Non-album singles
"Text" (Check the Star featuring Aaron Carter)	2023	Non-album singles

== Guest appearances ==
List of non-single guest appearances, with other performing artists, showing year released and album name
Title	Year	Album
"(Have Some) Fun with the Funk"	1999	Pokémon: The First Movie: Music from and Inspired by the Motion Picture
"Iko Iko"	2000	Music from and Inspired by The Little Vampire
"Life is a Party"	2000	The Other Me (2000 film)
"A.C.'s Alien Nation"	2001	Jimmy Neutron: Boy Genius (Music from the Motion Picture)
"Go Jimmy Jimmy"	2001	Jimmy Neutron: Boy Genius (Music from the Motion Picture)
"Little Bitty Pretty One"	2001	The Princess Diaries: Original Soundtrack
"I Just Can't Wait to Be King"	2002	Disneymania
"Through My Own Eyes"	2002	Liberty's Kids
"Get Up on Ya Feet"	2003	Kim Possible (Songs from and Inspired by the Hit TV Series)
"Enuff of Me"	2005	Popstar
"What It Is" (with AP9)	2009	Reality Check

== Videography ==
Year	Title	Production details	Notes	Certifications
1998	Shake It – The Video	Released: 1998; Label: Shock; Format: VHS	Includes the videos of "Shake It", "Crush on You" and "Crazy Little Party Girl".	
1998	Private & Personal	Released: November 16, 1998; Label: Edel; Format: VHS	Includes backstage, interviews and live performances with Aaron.	
2000	Aaron's Party: The Videos	Released: October 10, 2000; Label: Jive / Zomba; Format: VHS / VCD / DVD	Includes five music videos ("Aaron's Party (Come Get It)", "I Want Candy", "Bounce", "Iko Iko", "The Clapping Song"), backstage, photo gallery, trivia and links.	RIAA: Platinum
2001	Aaron's Party: Live in Concert	Released: July 30, 2001; Label: Jive / Zomba; Format: VHS / VCD / DVD	The video features Aaron in concert at Disney's Hollywood Studios, Aaron's 13th birthday party, Carter recording his then-upcoming album, the music video for "That's How I Beat Shaq" along with a personal greeting from Aaron himself.	RIAA: Platinum
2002	Oh Aaron: Live in Concert	Released: March 26, 2002; Label: Jive / Zomba; Format: VHS / VCD / DVD	The video features Aaron in concert at Baton Rouge, Louisiana, backstage, music videos and links.	RIAA: Gold

== See also ==
- List of songs recorded by Aaron Carter
