= Come Get It: The Very Best of Aaron Carter =

Greatest hits album by Aaron Carter
- Released: January 17, 2006
- Recorded: 2000–2003
- Genre: Pop, dance, dance-pop, teen pop
- Length: 41:31
- Label: Jive; Legacy

Aaron Carter chronology
Most Requested Hits (2003)	Come Get It: The Very Best of Aaron Carter (2006)	2 Good 2 B True (2006)

Professional ratings
Review scores
Source	Rating
AllMusic	3/5 stars

Come Get It: The Very Best of Aaron Carter is the second greatest hits album by American singer Aaron Carter released on January 17, 2006, by Jive Records and Legacy Recordings. The album brings together material from his three studio albums issued by the label, Aaron's Party (Come Get It) (2000), Oh Aaron (2001) and Another Earthquake! (2002), as well as tracks from his 2003 compilation Most Requested Hits and the soundtrack to the 2001 film Jimmy Neutron: Boy Genius.

The release marked Carter's final album under Jive Records and was released during a period in which his recording career had slowed following legal disputes earlier in the decade. Around the same time, he began transitioning into television projects, including the reality series House of Carters. The compilation received mixed reviews from critics.

== Background ==
Come Get It: The Very Best of Aaron Carter is the fifth and final overall album released under the Jive Records label. Carter's recording career had come to a halt since his lawsuit against Lou Pearlman in 2003. By 2006, Carter had begun to transition away from recording and into reality television with the premiere of the reality show House of Carters.

== Critical reception ==
The album received mixed reviews, with ChartAttack calling it inexplicable. Writing for AllMusic, Stephen Thomas Erlewine praises the compilation for its tighter and more concise approach to Carter's discography, compared to 2003's Most Requested Hits. Erlewine also notes the omission of "Shake It", Carter's first hit, and Carter's cover of "Surfin' USA", both tracks present on his debut album. The Record wrote that the album's songs "range from teen pop ballads to kid friendly not-quite-rap" and described it as "a little light on material", suggesting that Aaron Carter's "best material hasn't made it" onto the compilation, while adding that it "appears he's cashing in on his youthful good looks". Entertainment Weekly remarked that recent compilations by less-established artists have made "'best of' a relative term" and included the album among such releases, noting that Carter's collection fits within a wave of "lower-wattage outputs". The magazine considered as "essential tracks" the songs "Aaron's Party (Come Get It)" and "Oh Aaron".

== Track listing ==
1. "Aaron's Party (Come Get It)" – 3:25
2. "That's How I Beat Shaq" – 3:24
3. "Bounce" – 3:19
4. "My Internet Girl" – 4:00
5. "I Want Candy" – 3:14
6. "Leave It Up to Me" – 2:58
7. "A.C.'s Alien Nation" – 3:22
8. "Oh Aaron" (with Nick Carter and No Secrets) – 3:18
9. "I'm All About You" – 3:41
10. "To All the Girls" – 3:26
11. "Another Earthquake" – 2:52
12. "One Better" – 3:30

== Track information ==
- Tracks 1–5 can be found on 2000's Aaron's Party (Come Get It).
- Tracks 6–7 can be found on 2001's Jimmy Neutron: Boy Genius soundtrack.
- Tracks 8–9 can be found on 2001's Oh Aaron.
- Tracks 10–11 can be found on 2002's Another Earthquake.
- Track 12 can be found on 2003's Most Requested Hits.

Track 1, "Aaron's Party (Come Get It)" peaked at #35 on the Billboard Hot 100 the week of September 16, 2000.

Tracks 6 and 7 did not chart but were part of a landmark cross-promotion deal between Nickelodeon Records and Jive Records.

Track 9, "I'm All About You", landed on Top 40 radio in 2002.

Despite both charting in the Top 10 in the United Kingdom, neither "Crush on You" or "Crazy Little Party Girl" appear on this compilation. No definitive statement was given for their omission, however Carter is known to dislike his debut album and original singing voice. This was the second compilation album of his, after 2003's Most Requested Hits where no songs from his debut album were featured.
