= List of songs recorded by Aaron Carter =

The following is a list of released songs recorded and performed by Aaron Carter.

Song	Artist(s)	Writer(s)	Album(s)	Year	Ref.
"2 Good 2 B True"	Aaron Carter	Martin Bushell; Phil Dane	Another Earthquake!	2002	
"A.C.'s Alien Nation"	Aaron Carter	L. Secon; M. Power	Jimmy Neutron: Boy Genius	2001	
"Aaron's Party (Come Get It)"	Aaron Carter	Josh Schwartz; Brian Kierulf	Aaron's Party (Come Get It)	2000	
"Ain't That Cute"	Aaron Carter	Nick Carter; Gary Carolla; Brian Littrell	Aaron Carter	1997	
"America A O"	Aaron Carter	Alan Ross	Another Earthquake!	2002	
"Another Earthquake"	Aaron Carter		Another Earthquake!	2002	
"Baby It's You"	Aaron Carter		Oh Aaron	2001	
"Bounce"	Aaron Carter	Pete Kirtley; Tim Hawes; M. Barber; J. Albert; A. Bostelaar; L. Martin; Niels Stuart	Aaron's Party (Come Get It)	2000	
"Come Follow Me"	Aaron Carter		Oh Aaron	2001	
"Cowgirl (Lil' Mama)"	Aaron Carter		Oh Aaron	2001	
"Crazy Little Party Girl"	Aaron Carter		Aaron Carter	1997	
"Crush on You"	Aaron Carter	Jerry Knight; Aaron Zigman	Aaron Carter	1997	
"Dance with Me"	Aaron Carter featuring Flo Rida		Single release	2009	
"Dearly Departed"	Aaron Carter	A. Carter; Jon Asher; Melanie Fontana; Taylor Helgeson; Michel Schulz	LøVë EP	2017	
"Do You Remember"	Aaron Carter		Another Earthquake!	2002	
"Don't Say Goodbye"	Aaron Carter	Taylor Helgeson; Melanie Fontana; Aaron Carter; Michel Schulz	Single release	2017	
"Enuff of Me"	Aaron Carter		Popstar	2005	
"Fool's Gold"	Aaron Carter	A. Carter; Jon Asher; Melanie Fontana; Taylor Helgeson; Michel Schulz	LøVë EP	2017	
"Get Up on Ya Feet"	Aaron Carter		Kim Possible	2001	
"Get Wild"	Aaron Carter	Gary Carolla; Keith McGuffey; Sven Jordan	Aaron Carter	1997	
"Girl You Shine"	Aaron Carter	J. Elofsson; K. Larsson; Gary Carolla; P. Landin	Aaron's Party (Come Get It)	2000	
"Go Jimmy Jimmy"	Aaron Carter		Jimmy Neutron: Boy Genius	2001	
"Hang On Sloopy"	Aaron Carter	W. Farrell; B. Russell	Aaron's Party (Come Get It)	2000	
"(Have Some) Fun with the Funk"	Aaron Carter	Steve Lunt	Pokémon: The First Movie, Aaron's Party (Come Get It)	1999	
"Hey You"	Aaron Carter		Oh Aaron	2001	
"I Just Can't Wait to Be King"	Aaron Carter	Tim Rice; Elton John	Disneymania	2002	
"I Want Candy"	Aaron Carter	Bert Berns; Robert Feldman; Gerald Goldstein; R. Gottehrer	Aaron's Party (Come Get It)	2000	
"I Will Be Yours"	Aaron Carter	Gary Carolla	Aaron Carter	1997	
"I Would"	Aaron Carter	Andy Goldmark	Oh Aaron	2001	
"I'd Do Anything"	Aaron Carter	Gary Carolla	Aaron Carter	1997	
"Iko Iko"	Aaron Carter	Barbara Anne Hawkins; R. L. Hawkins; Joan Marie Johnson; J. Jones; M. Jones; Sharon Jones; Jesse Thomas	Aaron's Party (Come Get It)	2000	
"I'm All About You"	Aaron Carter	Andy Goldmark	Oh Aaron	2001	
"I'm Gonna Miss You Forever"	Aaron Carter	Gary Carolla	Aaron Carter	1997	
"Jump, Jump"	Aaron Carter		Aaron's Party (Come Get It)	2000	
"Keep Believing"	Aaron Carter	Andy Goldmark; Mark Mueller	Another Earthquake!	2002	
"Leave It Up to Me"	Aaron Carter	L. Secon; M. Power	Jimmy Neutron: Boy Genius, Oh Aaron	2001	
"Let Me Let You"	Aaron Carter	A. Carter; Jon Asher; Melanie Fontana; Taylor Helgeson; Michel Schulz	LøVë EP	2017	
"Life is a Party"	Aaron Carter	Andy Goldman; J. Houston; J. Dean Hicks	The Other Me (2000 film), Aaron's Party (Come Get It)	2000	
"Little Bitty Pretty One"	Aaron Carter	Bobby Day	The Princess Diaries	2001	
"My First Ride"	Aaron Carter		Another Earthquake!	2002	
"My Internet Girl"	Aaron Carter	L. Curle; P. Nicholas; G. Dennis	Aaron's Party (Come Get It)	2000	
"Not Too Young, Not Too Old"	Aaron Carter	S. Williams	Oh Aaron	2001	
"Oh Aaron"	Aaron Carter featuring Nick Carter and No Secrets	Andy Goldmark	Oh Aaron	2001	
"One Bad Apple"	Aaron Carter	George Jackson	Aaron Carter	1997	
"One Better"	Aaron Carter	Aaron Carter; B. Kierulf; J. Schwartz	Most Requested Hits	2003	
"One for the Summer"	Aaron Carter		Oh Aaron	2001	
"Ooh Wee"	Aaron Carter		Single release	2014	
"Please Don't Go Girl"	Aaron Carter	Maurice Starr	Aaron Carter	1997	
"Planet Rock"	Aaron Carter featuring Busta Rhymes		Single release	2010	
"Real Good Time"	Aaron Carter	A. Olafsdottir; M. Mehyer	Aaron's Party (Come Get It)	2000	
"Same Way"	Aaron Carter	A. Carter; Jon Asher; Melanie Fontana; Taylor Helgeson; Michel Schulz	LøVë EP	2017	
"Saturday Night"	Aaron Carter		Popstar	2005	
"Shake It"	Aaron Carter featuring 95 South	Gary Carolla; Joe Smith	Aaron Carter	1997	
"Sooner Or Later"	Aaron Carter	A. Carter; Jon Asher; Melanie Fontana; Taylor Helgeson; Michel Schulz	LøVë EP	2017	
"Stride (Jump on the Fizzy)"	Aaron Carter featuring No Secrets	M.G. Wilder	Oh Aaron	2001	
"Sugar"	Aaron Carter		Another Earthquake!	2002	
"Summertime"	Aaron Carter featuring Baha Men	Martin Bushell; Tony Momrelle	Another Earthquake!	2002	
"Surfin' USA"	Aaron Carter	Brian Wilson; Chuck Berry	Surfin' USA, Aaron Carter	1998	
"Swing It Out"	Aaron Carter	Veit Renn; Jolyon Skinner	Aaron Carter	1997	
"Tell Me How to Make You Smile"	Aaron Carter	Gary Carolla; David Granati	Aaron Carter	1997	
"Tell Me What You Want"	Aaron Carter	Lamont Dozier	Aaron's Party (Come Get It)	2000	
"That's How I Beat Shaq"	Aaron Carter	Josh Schwartz; Brian Kierulf	Aaron's Party (Come Get It)	2000	
"The Clapping Song"	Aaron Carter	Lincoln Chase; L. Kent; J. McCarthy	Aaron's Party (Come Get It)	2000	
"The Kid in You"	Aaron Carter	Andy Goldmark	Oh Aaron	2001	
"Through My Own Eyes"	Aaron Carter with Kayla Hinkle		Liberty's Kids	2002	
"To All the Girls"	Aaron Carter	Rich Cronin; Ken Gioia	Another Earthquake!	2002	
"When It Comes to You"	Aaron Carter	Kevin Paige; Veit Renn	Another Earthquake!	2002	
"Without You (There'd Be No Me)"	Aaron Carter	Martin Bushell; Ben Copland; Tony Momrelle	Another Earthquake!	2002	
"Honest Man"	Aaron Carter featuring Matell	Matell	Honest Man!	2022	
"Something To Fk With"	Aaron Carter featuring Matell	Matell	Something To Fk With!	2022	
"You Are the One"	Aaron Carter featuring Matell	Matell	You Are the One!	2022	
"Text"	Aaron Carter featuring Matell	Matell	Text!	2022	
