= Oh Aaron: Live in Concert =

Video by Aaron Carter featuring Nick Carter
- Released: March 26, 2002
- Recorded: 2001–2002
- Genre: Pop/Rap/Dance
- Language: English
- Label: Jive/Zomba

Aaron Carter featuring Nick Carter chronology
Aaron's Party: Live in Concert (2001)	Oh Aaron: Live in Concert (2002)

Oh Aaron: Live in Concert is the fourth DVD release by pop singer Aaron Carter, released in 2002. It is his second live concert video. The video peaked at #6 at US Billboard Top Music Video charts. The DVD was certified Gold by RIAA on May 1, 2002.

== Synopsis ==
This DVD stars Aaron and his brother, Backstreet Boys member Nick Carter in concert at Baton Rouge, Louisiana performing songs from his albums Oh Aaron, Aaron's Party (Come Get It) and his first self-titled album on his concert tour including "Life is a Party" from Disney Channel's The Other Me. He also performs songs from the Jimmy Neutron: Boy Genius soundtrack. Nick Carter also sings "I Need You Tonight". Special features include hanging out with Aaron and Nick, behind the scenes of "Oh Aaron" and "Not Too Young, Not Too Old", and an interview with Aaron. The live band is composed by Patrice "P-Bass" Jones (bass, backing vocals and MD), Simone Sello (guitars), Stanley Jones (keyboards), Petey-P Merriweather (drums), Mark Giovi (backing vocals) and Lindsay Cole (backing vocals).

=== Songs performed ===
1. "Life is a Party" – 3:29
2. "Get Wild" – 4:45
3. "Iko Iko" – 2:41
4. "Bounce" – 3:19
5. "I Need You Tonight" (sung solo by Nick Carter) – 4:23
6. "Not Too Young, Not Too Old" (Nick Carter) – 3:07
7. "Tell Me What You Want" – 3:12
8. "Oh Aaron" – 3:17
9. "Real Good Time" – 3:14
10. "I'm All About You" – 3:41
11. "Shake It" – 3:22
12. "Heaven" – 3:52
13. "A.C.'s Alien Nation" – 3:22
14. "I Want Candy" – 3:13
15. "That's How I Beat Shaq" – 3:25
16. "Aaron's Party (Come Get It)" – 3:24

=== Music videos ===
1. "Leave It Up to Me"
2. "I'm All About You"
3. "Oh Aaron" (featuring Nick Carter and No Secrets)

=== Special features ===
1. Backstage with Aaron & Nick: Starting in "The Biz"
2. Backstage with Aaron & Nick: The Older Brother Influence
3. On the Boat
4. Behind the scenes at the "Oh Aaron" shot with Aaron, Nick, and No Secrets
5. Aaron Goes Airboating
6. Aaron Eats a Cajun Lunch
7. Aaron Picks Up Nick at the Airport
8. Aaron & Nick's Jam Session at Mulate's
9. Behind the Scenes for "Not Too Young, Not Too Old"
10. Bonus interview with Aaron

== Certifications and sales ==
Region	Certification	Certified units/sales
United States (RIAA)	Gold	50,000^{^}
^{^} Shipments figures based on certification alone.
