= Most Requested Hits =

Greatest hits album by Aaron Carter
- Released: November 3, 2003
- Recorded: 2000–2003
- Genre: Teen pop, pop rap, dance-pop
- Length: 54:56
- Label: Jive

Aaron Carter chronology
Another Earthquake! (2002)	Most Requested Hits (2003)	Come Get It: The Very Best of Aaron Carter (2006)

Singles from Most Requested Hits
- 1. "She Wants Me" Released: 2003; 2. "One Better" Released: November 3, 2003

Most Requested Hits is American teen pop singer Aaron Carter's first compilation album and fourth overall album under Jive Records. The compilation includes no tracks from Carter's self-titled debut album, and was released on November 3, 2003. The album was initially announced with an accompanying DVD, but it was later cancelled by Jive due to technical issues.

== Critical reception ==
Professional ratings
Review scores
Source	Rating
AllMusic	3.5/5 stars

Neil Strauss of The New York Times wrote that Aaron Carter's early hits "must make him cringe", and added that "they make me cringe". Adam Tod Brown of Cracked mocked the album's premise, questioning the title with, "Most requested hits? Requested by who?" and sarcastically suggesting that a "Freedom of Information Act request is pending" to see the supposed data. He highlighted "That's How I Beat Shaq" as the "Best Moment".

Stephen Thomas Erlewine of AllMusic argued that although Most Requested Hits suggests a comprehensive roundup, "not a lot of hits" justified such a compilation, noting that "'Shake It' has been left off, as is anything from his 1998 debut". He observed that Aaron was "trying to present himself as a young adult" and highlighted material from Another Earthquake!, concluding that the album becomes "an interesting listen", since it "winds up having contrast and a narrative", even if it "doesn't have all of his hits".

== Track listing ==
Most Requested Hits track listing
No.	Title	Writer(s)	Album	Length
1.	"Aaron's Party (Come Get It)"	B. Kierulf; J. Schwartz	Aaron's Party (Come Get It)	3:25
2.	"I Want Candy"	Bert Berns; Gerald Goldstein; Richard Gottehrer; Robert Feldman	Aaron's Party (Come Get It)	3:14
3.	"That's How I Beat Shaq"	B. Kierulf; J. Schwartz	Aaron's Party (Come Get It)	3:25
4.	"Oh Aaron" (featuring Nick Carter and No Secrets)	Andy Goldmark; B. Kierulf; J. Schwartz	Oh Aaron	3:17
5.	"Not Too Young, Not Too Old" (featuring Nick Carter)	A. Lindsey; L. Palmer; L. Secon; M. Power; S. Williams; V. Raeburn	Oh Aaron	3:08
6.	"I'm All About You"	Andy Goldmark; M. Mueller	Oh Aaron	3:41
7.	"Leave It Up to Me"	L. Secon; M. Power	Jimmy Neutron: Boy Genius soundtrack	2:59
8.	"Another Earthquake"	L. Secon; M. Power	Another Earthquake!	2:51
9.	"To All the Girls"	K. Giola; Rich Cronin; Sheppard	Another Earthquake!	3:26
10.	"Summertime" (featuring Baha Men)	Martin Bushell; N. Cook; Tony Momrelle	Another Earthquake!	3:50
11.	"Do You Remember"	D. O'Donoghue; M. Mueller; M. Sheehan	Another Earthquake!	3:58
12.	"America A O"	Alan Ross; L. Secon; M. Power	Another Earthquake!	3:30
13.	"She Wants Me" (featuring Nick Carter)	J. Coplan	New track	3:43
14.	"One Better"	A. Carter; B. Kierulf; J. Schwartz	New track	3:29
15.	"My Shorty"	A. Theodore; M. Sandlofer	New track	3:41
16.	"One Better (Remix)" (Hidden bonus track)	A. Carter; B. Kierulf; J. Schwartz	New track	3:19

== Charts ==
Weekly chart performance for Most Requested Hits
Chart (2003)	Peak position
Japanese Albums Chart	160
