= HitClips =

Popular kids' toy from 2000 to 2004

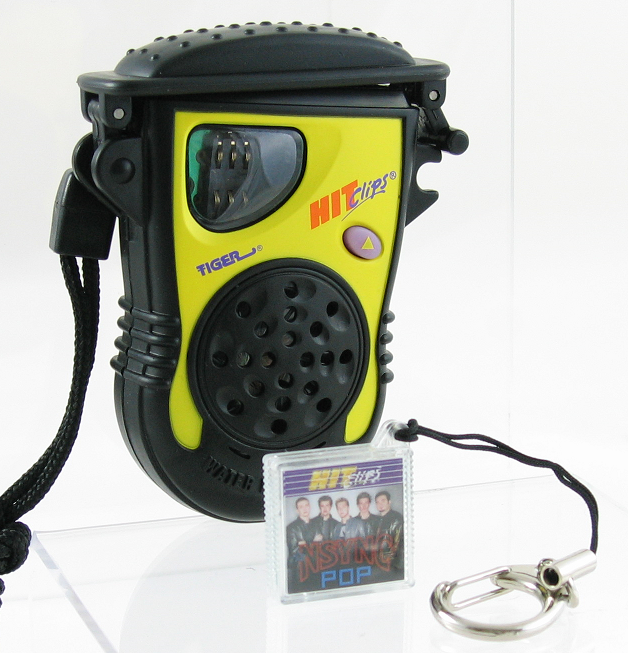
- HitClips player with NSYNC cartridge
- Media type: Flash ROM
- Capacity: up to 1 minute, 23 seconds (prerecorded chips) up to 2 minutes, 2 seconds (discs and Downloader)
- Developed by: Tiger Electronics
- Released: August 11, 2000 (chips); February 15, 2004 (discs)
- Discontinued: February 2005

HitClips is a digital audio player created by Tiger Electronics that plays low-fidelity mono one-minute clips of usually teen pop hits from exchangeable chip cartridges. It first launched on August 11, 2000 in the United States, with a McDonald's and Jive Records promotional campaign selling the micro personal player with either "Stronger" by Britney Spears or "It's Gonna Be Me" by NSYNC. The full HitClips lineup debuted on September 28, 2000 at retail stores, with an expanded lineup of music chips and players. Later, a version for young children known as KidClips was launched. Tiger Electronics had licensing agreements for HitClips with popular major record labels including Atlantic Records, Zomba Label Group (owners of Jive) and Capitol Records.

HitClips Discs are a circle-shaped variant of HitClips. The format requires a disc-compatible player, which launched on February 15, 2004, alongside 20 singles. By the end of the year, another 12 disc-based singles were released.

Hilary Duff became the spokeswoman for HitClips and VideoNow in 2003, with several of her songs featured in these toys' lineups. In 2004, Raven became the new spokeswoman, with two of her songs receiving a HitClips Discs release by the year's end.

In February 2005, at the American International Toy Fair, Hasbro discontinued the HitClips lineup. The company stated that it has "moved on" to VideoNow Color music videos as the successor to HitClips.

== Song list ==
HitClips has released a total of 159 singles from 84 artists. Most of these used the original HitClips chip format, although 32 singles were released as HitClips Discs. Of the disc-based singles, 12 were available as both chips and discs, while 21 were disc-only releases.

Aaron Carter
"Aaron's Party (Come Get It)"
"I Want Candy"
"Leave It Up to Me"
"Not Too Young, Not Too Old"
"Oh Aaron"
"That's How I Beat Shaq"

Atomic Kitten
"The Tide Is High (Get the Feeling)" †

A-Teens
"Dancing Queen"

Avril Lavigne
"Complicated" †
"Sk8er Boi" †

Backstreet Boys
"I Want It That Way"
"Larger Than Life"
"More than That"
"Shape of My Heart"
"The Call"

Baha Men
"Accident"
"Move It Like This"
"Who Let the Dogs Out?"

Blue Swede
"Hooked on a Feeling"

Brandy
"Full Moon"

Bow Wow and Baby
"Let's Get Down" ‡

Britney Spears
"...Baby One More Time"
"I'm a Slave 4 U"
"I'm Not a Girl, Not Yet a Woman"
"Lucky"
"Oops!... I Did It Again"
"Overprotected"
"Stronger"
"(You Drive Me) Crazy"

Britney Spears and Madonna
"Me Against the Music" ‡

Clay Aiken
"Invisible" ‡

Daniel Bedingfield
"Gotta Get Thru This"

Destiny's Child
"Emotion"
"Independent Women"
"Survivor"

Dream
"He Loves U Not"
"This is Me"

Dream Street
"Gotta Get the Girl"
"It Happens Every Time"

Elvis Presley
"Jailhouse Rock"
"Hound Dog"
"(Let Me Be Your) Teddy Bear"

Enrique Iglesias
"Hero"

Faith Hill
"This Kiss"
"The Way You Love Me"
"Breathe"

Geri Halliwell
"It's Raining Men"
"Scream If You Wanna Go Faster"

Gloria Gaynor
"I Will Survive"

Gorillaz
"Clint Eastwood"

Goo Goo Dolls
"Here Is Gone"

Hanson
"If Only"

Hilary Duff
"Come Clean" ‡
"I Can't Wait" ‡
"I Can't Wait (Remix)"
"So Yesterday" ‡
"Why Not" †

Hoku
"Another Dumb Blonde"
"How Do I Feel"

James Brown
"I Got You (I Feel Good)" ‡

Jenifer Bartoli
"Au soleil"
"Des mots qui résonnent!"

Jewel
"Standing Still"

Jump5
"God Bless the USA"

Justin Timberlake
"Like I Love You"

KC and the Sunshine Band
"That's the Way (I Like It)"

Kelly Clarkson
"A Moment Like This" ‡
"Low" ‡

Kool & the Gang
"Celebration"

Krystal Harris
"Supergirl"

Las Ketchup
"The Ketchup Song (Aserejé)"

Lil Romeo
"My Baby"
"The Girlies"

Lindsay Lohan
"Ultimate" ‡

Lindsay Pagano
"Everything U R"

M2M
"Mirror Mirror"

Madonna
"Cherish"
"Don't Tell Me"
"Lucky Star"
"Material Girl"
"Music"
"Hollywood" †
"Ray of Light"

Mario
"Braid My Hair"

Manfred Mann
"Do Wah Diddy Diddy"

Michelle Branch
"All You Wanted"
"Are You Happy Now?" ‡
"Breathe" ‡
"Everywhere"

Natasha St-Pier
"Nos rendez-vous"

Natasha St-Pier with Pascal Obispo
"Tu trouveras"

Nick Carter
"Help Me"

Nikki Cleary
"1-2-3" ‡

Nivea and Jagged Edge
"Don't Mess with My Man"

No Secrets
"That's What Girls Do"

NSYNC
"Bringin' da Noise"
"Bye Bye Bye"
"Celebrity"
"Girlfriend"
"It's Gonna Be Me"
"No Strings Attached"
"Pop"
"This I Promise You"

Otis Day and the Knights
"Shout"

O-Town
"All or Nothing"
"Baby I Would"
"These Are the Days"
"We Fit Together"

Paulina Rubio
"Don't Say Goodbye"

Pink
"Don't Let Me Get Me"
"Most Girls"
"There You Go"

Play
"Us Against The World"

Raven
"Grazin' in the Grass" ‡
"Supernatural" ‡
"True to Your Heart" (cancelled) ‡

Ritchie Valens
"La Bamba"

S Club 7
"Natural"

Sammie
"I Like It"

Shaggy
"Angel"

Simple Plan
"Addicted" †
"Perfect" ‡

Sister Sledge
"We Are Family"

Smash Mouth
"All Star" †
"I'm a Believer" †
"Pacific Coast Party"
"Why Can't We Be Friends"
"You Are My Number One" ‡

Solange
"Crush"

soulDecision
"Ooh It's Kinda Crazy"

Stacie Orrico
"Stuck"
"(There's Gotta Be) More to Life" ‡

Sugar Ray
"Answer the Phone"
"Someday"
"When It's Over"

Technotronic
"Pump Up the Jam"

the Angels
"My Boyfriend's Back"

the Beach Boys
"California Girls" †
"Fun, Fun, Fun" †
"Good Vibrations" †

The Jackson 5
"ABC"
"I Want You Back" ‡

the Kingsmen
"Louie Louie"

the Supremes
"Stop! In the Name of Love" ‡

the Temptations
"My Girl" †

The Simpsons
"Bart"
"Homer"
"People of Springfield"

Tiktak
"Upside Down"

Toya
"I Do!!"
"No Matta What (Party All Night)"

Triple Image and Jamie Lynn Spears
"(Hey Now) Girls Just Want To Have Fun"

the Troggs
"Wild Thing"

Usher
"U Remind Me"

Vanessa Carlton
"A Thousand Miles"
"Ordinary Day"

Village People
"Y.M.C.A."

Will Smith
"Nod Ya Head"

Willa Ford
"Did Ya' Understand That"

Notes:
† This single was available in both the original HitClips and the HitClips Disc formats.
‡ This single was exclusively released as a HitClips Disc.

== Sales ==
- HitClips sold approximately 12 million players and music chips combined by the end of 2001.
- By June 2002, HitClips total sales surpassed 20 million.
- By December 2002, HitClips total sales surpassed 25 million.
- By April 2003, HitClips total sales surpassed 30 million.

== See also ==
- Pocket Rockers
- Tooth Tunes
