= Aaron's Party: Live in Concert =

Video by Aaron Carter
- Released: March 31, 2001 (Disney); July 30, 2001 (DVD)
- Recorded: 2000–2001
- Genre: Teen pop, Bubblegum pop, Pop rap, Dance-pop
- Language: English
- Label: Jive/Zomba

Aaron Carter chronology
Aaron's Party: The Videos (2000)	Aaron's Party: Live in Concert (2001)	Oh Aaron: Live in Concert (2002)

Professional ratings
Review scores
Source	Rating
Allmusic	2.5/5 stars

Aaron's Party: Live in Concert is teen pop star Aaron Carter's first concert DVD and third video release overall, released in 2001. The video peaked at #1 at US Billboard Top Music Video charts. The DVD was certified Platinum by RIAA on September 5, 2001.

== Synopsis ==
The video features Aaron in concert at Disney MGM Studios performing songs from his 2000 album, Aaron's Party (Come Get It) among two others; "Life is a Party" (from the Disney Channel TV Movie The Other Me and on the international edition of the album) and a non-album track, "One for the Summer".

Disney Channel aired the concert four months before it went to DVD and VHS with the same performance and behind-the-scenes clips of Aaron having fun at Disney World, but it also aired the Samantha Mumba performance at the concert, whereas the DVD omits Mumba performing and adds additional features along with the concert and Disney World clips.

The DVD release features footage from the concert including Aaron having fun in Disney World, Aaron's 13th birthday party, Carter recording his then-upcoming album, the music video for "That's How I Beat Shaq" along with a personal greeting from Aaron himself.

== Track listing ==
1. "Life is a Party"
2. "That's How I Beat Shaq"
3. "Tell Me What You Want"
4. "Bounce"
5. "Iko Iko"
6. "One for the Summer"
7. "I Want Candy"
8. "Aaron's Party (Come Get It)"

=== Special features ===
1. "That's How I Beat Shaq" music video
2. NBA's "Inside Stuff"
3. The making of "That's How I Beat Shaq"
4. Snippets of Aaron Carter in the studio recording Oh Aaron
5. Personal greeting from Aaron Carter
6. Aaron and family on performing
7. Aaron on his dirtbike
8. Aaron singing "Real Good Time" live from the House of Blues
9. Aaron in the SNICK house underground with his #1 fan
10. Aaron swimming with the fish
11. Aaron and Leslie singing "Staying Alive"

== Certifications and sales ==
Region	Certification	Certified units/sales
United States (RIAA)	Platinum	100,000^{^}
^{^} Shipments figures based on certification alone.
