= Aaron's Party: The Videos =

Video by Aaron Carter
- Released: October 10, 2000
- Recorded: 2000
- Genre: Pop/Rap/Dance
- Language: English
- Label: Jive/Zomba

Aaron Carter chronology
Private & Personal (1998)	Aaron's Party: The Videos (2000)	Aaron's Party: Live in Concert (2001)

Aaron's Party: The Videos is pop musician Aaron Carter's first music video DVD with videos from his then-recent album, Aaron's Party (Come Get It). It was released in 2000, the month after the release of the corresponding album. The video peaked at #7 at US Billboard Top Music Video Charts. The DVD was certified Platinum by RIAA on December 1, 2000.

== Videos ==
1. "Aaron's Party Come Get It"- 3:24
2. "I Want Candy"- 3:13
3. "Bounce"- 3:19
4. "Iko Iko"- 2:41
5. "The Clapping Song"- 2:58

== Certifications and sales ==
Region	Certification	Certified units/sales
United States (RIAA)	Platinum	100,000^{^}
^{^} Shipments figures based on certification alone.
