= Blacklisted (Aaron Carter album) =

Studio album by Aaron Carter
- Released: November 7, 2022
- Recorded: 2021–2022
- Length: 28:26
- Label: Rakkaus
- Producers: Aaron Carter; Morgan Matthews; The BeatSlinger; Fred Taylor; Elijah Vincent; PlayMeSomeFiya; Austin Edwards; Osie Brown; Clarence Earl Chance III

Aaron Carter chronology
Love (2018)	Blacklisted (2022)	Recovery (2024)

Singles from Blacklisted
- 1. "So Much to Say" Released: November 22, 2021; 2. "Reload the Wesson" Released: January 12, 2022; 3. "She Just Wanna Ride" Released: March 18, 2022; 4. "Blame It On Me" Released: April 27, 2022; 5. "Scars" Released: September 23, 2022

Blacklisted is the sixth and final studio album by American musician Aaron Carter released by Rakkaus Records. Throughout 2021 and 2022, the project was previewed through a series of independently released singles, while the album was originally scheduled for release in December 2022.

The album was issued on November 7, just two days after Carter's death at the age of 34. Its release sparked controversy for occurring without authorization from his estate and was removed from streaming platforms shortly afterward.

== Background and release ==
In 2018, Aaron Carter released his fifth studio album Love (stylized as LØVË), more than thirteen years after the release of his last studio album, titled Another Earthquake! (2002), and marking a shift toward a contemporary pop and EDM-oriented sound. The album was preceded by several singles, including "Sooner or Later", which was certified gold in Italy, a modest commercial resurgence in his career.

In January 2022, the singer stated in social media that his new LP will come soon, and that he was creating a rap album. During the same year, several songs were released such as "So Much to Say", "Reload the Wesson", "Demons", "She Just Wanna Ride", "Blockbuster", "Blame It on Me" and "Scars". Blacklisted was originally been scheduled to be released by Rakkaus Records (Carter's own label) on December 7, which would have been his 35th birthday.

On November 5, 2022, Carter died at his home in Lancaster, California, at age 34. The album was then released on November 7th. The release was met with controversy, as it was issued without authorization from Carter's estate two days after his death. Producers Morgan Matthews and John Wyatt Johnson stated on the day of the artist's death: "We decided to release Blacklisted tomorrow to honor him and share his exceptional artistry with his fans around the world as we all mourn his loss". Carter's manager, Taylor Helgeson, told that the album had been released without permission and that efforts would be made to have it removed from streaming platforms. The album was removed from streaming services six days after its release.

== Singles ==
"So Much to Say", was released one year prior to the album, in November 2021. The singer teased the next single, "Reload the Wesson", on social media on January 4, 2020, informing that the track was produced by TheBeatSlinger. "She Just Wanna Ride" is the third single from the album and features American singer-songwriter 3D Friends. The song includes "atmospheric vocals and catchy soundscapes", and fuse "powerful beats and ecstatic melodies". It debuted alongside its music video that "depicts the two artists in a deserted natural setting, where they ride various vehicles as they sing and move to the music".

A handful of new tracks from Carter, including the single "Blame It on Me", became available on streaming services in 2022. His latest release was the single "Scars" featuring 3D Friends.

== Track listing ==
Blacklisted track listing
No.	Title	Writer(s)	Length
1.	"So Much to Say"	Aaron Carter; Bryan Cassidy; Morgan Matthews	3:06
2.	"Blame It on Me"	Aaron Carter	3:23
3.	"She Just Wanna Ride" (featuring 3D Friends)	Dan C. Wright; Morgan Matthews	2:43
4.	"Reload the Wesson" (featuring Twista)	Aaron Carter; Twista; Bryan Cassidy; The BeatSlinger	2:32
5.	"Scars" (featuring 3D Friends)	Dan C. Wright; Morgan Matthews	2:24
6.	"Back to Life" (featuring 3D Friends)	Aaron Carter; Dan C. Wright	2:50
7.	"Never Say Sorry" (featuring 3D Friends)	Aaron Carter; Dan C. Wright	4:09
8.	"City of Dreams"	Aaron Carter; Morgan Matthews; Bryan Cassidy; The BeatSlinger	3:06
9.	"Ridin' on Em" (featuring Seejay and Rocky Luciano)	Dan C. Wright; Morgan Matthews	1:54
10.	"Time in a Bottle"	Jim Croce	2:16

== Personnel ==
- Aaron Carter –
