= Andrea Garnett =

Andrea Garnett may refer to:

- Andrea Garnett, fictional character in The Last Ship (TV series)
- Andrea Garnett, actress in The Other Me
