= Recovery (Aaron Carter album) =

Studio album by Aaron Carter
- Released: May 24, 2024
- Recorded: 2014–2022
- Length: 30:55
- Label: Symphonic Distribution
- Producer: Aaron Pearce

Aaron Carter chronology
Blacklisted (2022)	Recovery (2024)

Singles from Recovery
- 1. "Ooh Wee" Released: 2014; 2. "Recovery" Released: 2024

Recovery is a posthumous album by American singer-songwriter Aaron Carter, released on May 24, 2024, through Symphonic Distribution. The project was announced by Carter's twin sister Angel alongside producer Aaron Pearce and former manager Lori Knight.

The album was released following controversy surrounding the unauthorized posthumous release of the album Blacklisted shortly after Carter's death in November 2022. The album was promoted by the singles "Ooh Wee" and "Recovery", the last mentioned featuring themes of healing, personal struggles, and mental health.

== Background and release ==
Aaron Carter died on November 5, 2022, at the age of 34, after being found unresponsive in the bathtub of his home in Lancaster, California. Producers Morgan Matthews and John Wyatt Johnson released a posthumous album, Blacklisted, on November 7th, two days after his death. The release generated controversy and was shortly removed from streaming services after being issued without authorization from Carter’s management.

On April 5, 2024, Carter's twin sister Angel Carter Conrad, alongside producer and longtime collaborator Aaron Pearce and former manager Lori Knight, officially announced The Recovery Album, a posthumous project scheduled for release on May 24, 2024, during Mental Health Awareness Month. A portion of the project's proceeds would benefit the organization On Our Sleeves and a trust established for Carter's son, Prince Lyric Carter. The album was released through Symphonic Distribution.

== Singles ==
"Ooh Wee" was released on October 14, 2014 as the lead single from Aaron Carter's upcoming album. It was produced by Grammy Award winning producer and songwriter Aaron Pearce. The song is hip hop-influenced, and according to the singer it "reflects my evolution as a performer while still staying true to my roots". Carter also stated that the title was inspired by an expression used to react to someone considered attractive. He described the track as a "very flirtatious record", adding that the song reflected his personality and carefree attitude toward relationships. Little Village magazine wrote that the song was "a more mature Carter, but he definitely hasn't lost his ability to get a crowd moving", while Tampa Bay Times described it as a "pseudo club banger". Following the singer's death, "Ooh Wee" was re-released in March 2024 as the first single from Recovery.

"Recovery" was released as a posthumous single in tribute to the late singer, featuring lyrics centered on pain, healing, and personal struggle. The track was issued by his twin sister, Angel Carter, alongside producer Aaron Pearce, following requests from fans for Carter's unreleased music to be made available. The release coincided with the unveiling of the trailer for the documentary series Fallen Idols: Nick and Aaron Carter, which explored the controversies surrounding Nick Carter as well as Aaron's struggles with mental health and substance abuse prior to his death.

== Track listing ==
Recovery track listing
No.	Title	Writer(s)	Producer(s)	Length
1.	"Ooh Wee"	Aaron Pearce; Jared Cotter; Negin Djafari; Damon Sharpe; James Washington	Aaron Pearce	3:34
2.	"Back Up Off the Wall"	Pearce; Cotter; Djafari; Sharpe; Washington	Pearce	3:17
3.	"Recovery"	Pearce; Cotter; Djafari; Sharpe; Washington	Pearce	3:17
4.	"Wonderful World"	Pearce; Nick Furlong; Travis Garland	Pearce	3:48
5.	"Just to Be Loved"	Pearce	Pearce	3:23
6.	"Screwed Up"	Pearce; Cotter; Djafari; Sharpe; Washington	Pearce	3:26
7.	"Don't Know You Like Me"	Pearce; Cotter; Djafari; Sharpe; Washington	Pearce	3:00
8.	"Another Summer Night"	Pearce	Pearce	3:36
9.	"Ooh Wee" (featuring Pat Solo)	Pearce; Cotter; Djafari; Sharpe; Washington	Pearce	3:34
