= Love (Aaron Carter album) =

Studio album by Aaron Carter
- Released: February 16, 2018
- Genre: Pop
- Length: 48:30
- Label: Sony Music; Z Entertainment
- Producer: Aaron Carter; Michel Schulz

Aaron Carter chronology
Love (EP) (2017)	Love (2018)	Blacklisted (2022)

Singles from Love
- 1. "Don't Say Goodbye" Released: December 8, 2017; 2. "I Want Candy (Remix)" Released: February 14, 2018

Love (stylized as LØVË) is the fifth studio album by American singer and songwriter Aaron Carter, released on February 16, 2018, by Sony Music, and the last to be released in his lifetime. At the time of the album’s release it was Carter's first studio album in over fifteen years, since 2002's Another Earthquake. The album was preceded by an EP of the same name, released in 2017.

== Background and release ==
More than thirteen years after the release of his last studio album, titled Another Earthquake!, and a substantial number of greatest hits compilations, Carter appeared in media outlets talking about his return to music. According to the singer, he spent ten years learning how to make an album from scratch during his time out of the music business.

Carter began to tease the first single of the album, titled "Fool's Gold" which he wrote and produced himself, in November 2015 via Twitter. On November 24, 2015, Billboard premiered a preview of the song. The song and its accompanying music video, co-directed by Carter and Jon Asher, were released on April 1, 2016. The single did not manage to appear on major worldwide charts. At that time the singer also announced that an EP entitled LØVË would be released. Carter told Billboard: "'The 'LøVë' album and 'Fool's Gold' era has been D.I.Y. hustle since day one. Everything from the production, songwriting, mixing, photoshoots, music videos, packaging and distribution have been a collective involvement from a team I like to call 'Team Fool's Gold.'"

In 2017, Carter would release a second single titled "Sooner or Later" which became certified gold in Italy, his first gold record since "Saturday Night", which was certified in the US after selling over 500,000 copies, in 2005. In December 2017, he released the third and last single "Don't Say Goodbye" and announced a promotional tour in the United States. The singer also performed at a concert in Manila, Philippines.

To celebrate Valentine's Day and promote the album's release, Carter released a newly recorded and remixed version of his top ten hit from 2000, "I Want Candy", on February 14, 2018.

== Critical reception ==
Professional ratings
Review scores
Source	Rating
AllMusic	3.5/5 stars
Knoxville News Sentinel	2/5 stars

Neil Z. Yeung, from AllMusic, rated the album three and a half stars out of five, writing that Carter does "an admirable job grasping the contemporary pop trends of 2017 and 2018 while adjusting his lyrical content from that of teen party jams to reflective heartbreak anthems."

Chuck Campbell, from the daily newspaper Knoxville News Sentinel, gave the album two out of five stars and described it as a "nondescript exercise in modern formula – shallow pop/EDM songs about relationships. And even compared to other fare in this genre, "Love" falls flat". He chose "the catchy" songs "Sooner or Later" and "Dearly Departed" as its best moments.

== Track listing ==
All songs produced by Aaron Carter and Michael “Brandon" Murphy.

Love track listing
No.	Title	Writer(s)	Length
1.	"Hard to Love"	Aaron Carter; Michael Murphy; Melanie Fontana; Taylor Helgeson	3:35
2.	"Sooner or Later"	Carter; Jon Asher; Fontana; Helgeson; Schulz	3:33
3.	"Bad 2 Good"	Carter; Gino Barletta; Asher; Fontana; Schulz; Skyler Stonestreet	3:57
4.	"Same Way"	Carter; Asher; Fontana; Helgeson; Schulz	3:07
5.	"What Did You Want to Say?"	Carter; Asher; Fontana; Helgeson; Schulz; Mike Molina	3:18
6.	"Fool's Gold"	Carter; Asher; Murphy; Fontana; Helgeson; Schulz	3:17
7.	"Seattle TideZ"	Carter; Asher; Fontana; Helgeson; Schulz	3:45
8.	"Let Me Let You Go"	Carter; Asher; Fontana; Helgeson; Schulz	3:21
9.	"Don't Say Goodbye"	Carter; Asher; Fontana; Helgeson; Schulz	3:17
10.	"Almost There"	Carter; Asher; Fontana; Helgeson; Schulz	3:25
11.	"Champion"	Carter; Fontana; Schulz	4:10
12.	"Dearly Departed"	Carter; Asher; Fontana; Helgeson; Schulz	3:27
13.	"I Want Candy" (Remix)	Bert Berns; Bob Feldman; Jerry Goldstein; Richard Gottehrer	2:53
14.	"Fool's Gold" (Lindgren Remix)	Carter; Asher; Fontana; Helgeson; Schulz	3:35
