= Penn & Teller: Off the Deep End =

Penn & Teller: Off the Deep End is a two-hour special that premiered on NBC on November 13, 2005. It featured magicians Penn & Teller performing a variety of illusions in various locations around the Caribbean, most of which were done underwater or involved marine animals. It also featured a performance by musician Aaron Carter.
