= Saturday Night (Aaron Carter song) =

Single by Aaron Carter
- Released: 2005
- Genre: Teen pop
- Length: 3:47
- Label: Trans Continental Records
- Songwriters: A. Carter, D. Pierre, and S. Bolton
- Producer: Aaron Accetta

Aaron Carter singles chronology
"One Better" (2004)	"Saturday Night" (2005)	"Dance with Me" (2009)

"Saturday Night" is a 2005 single by Aaron Carter, featured on the soundtrack of the direct-to-video film Popstar, in which he starred. Released on May 10, 2005, the song received a positive review from Billboard and debuted at number six on the magazine's Hot Singles Sales chart, while also reaching number thirty-five on the Pop chart published by Radio & Records. The song was certified gold by Recording Industry Association of America (RIAA), for 500,000 copies sold.

== Background and release ==
In 2005, Carter starred as JD McQueen in Popstar, a direct-to-video movie released on March 29, 2005, loosely based on his own experience as a pop star. The new song "Saturday Night" was featured on the soundtrack.

In January 2005, some media outlets reported that Carter had arrived in Orlando for a photoshoot for the cover of the single, which was scheduled for release in March; the single was ultimately released on May 10.

== Critical reception ==
In his review for Billboard, Chuck Taylor described the single as "a happening, sensationally produced track" with "a pleasing, hook-drenched pop melody". He concluded his assessment by stating: "cast aside all prejudice; it's a good 'Night'". The song is also known for being featured in season 1, episode 6, of Fetch! With Ruff Ruffman.

== Commercial performance ==
The single debuted at number six on the Hot Singles Sales chart published by Billboard on April 16, 2005, marking its peak position on the chart. It returned to the same position on June 18, and spent a total of 13 weeks on the ranking. Its final appearance occurred on July 9, 2005, when it was listed at number fourteen.

On the Pop radio chart published by Radio & Records, the single reached number thirty-five on May 20, 2005, among the most-played songs on mainstream Pop stations.

== Track listing ==
Saturday Night
No.	Title	Writer(s)	Length
1.	"Saturday Night" (Original)	A. Carter; D. Pierre; S. Bolton	3:47
2.	"Saturday Night" (DJ Pezz Urban Mix)	A. Carter; D. Pierre; S. Bolton	3:47
3.	"Saturday Night" (DJ Roonie G Mix)	A. Carter; D. Pierre; S. Bolton	3:38
4.	"Saturday Night" (Double J Dancehall Remix)	A. Carter; D. Pierre; S. Bolton	3:52

== Personnel ==
Credits adapted from the liner notes of "Saturday Night" single.

Production and audio engineering

- Produced and engineered by Aaron Accetta
- Engineering by Mike Sroka
- Mastered by Chris Bellman
- Mixed by Sheppard & Kenny Gioia

Vocals

- Backing vocals by Honey B and Dakari
- Background vocals produced by Dakari

Art direction and management

- Art direction by Joe Thurdekoos
- Design by David Galliford
- Photography by Michael Cairns
- Management by Bob Carter, Louis Pearlman, and Tracy Barger

== Charts ==
Weekly chart performance for "Saturday Night"
Chart (2005)	Peak position
US Pop Top 50 Indicator (Radio & Records)	35
US Hot Singles Sales (Billboard)	6

== Certifications ==
Region	Certification	Certified units/sales
United States (RIAA)	Gold	500,000^{^}
^{*} Sales figures based on certification alone.

== Release history ==
Release dates and formats for "Saturday Night"
Region	Date	Format	Label(s)	Ref.
United States	March 1, 2005	Mainstream airplay	Transcontinental	
