= Alda (singer) =

Icelandic singer-songwriter (born 1966)

- Born: 9 July 1966 (age 60)
- Origin: Hellissandur, Iceland
- Genre: Pop
- Occupations: Singer; songwriter
- Instrument: Vocals
- Years active: Late 1980s–present
- Labels: Wildstar; CNR Music

Alda Björk Ólafsdóttir (born 9 July 1966), better known as simply Alda, is an Icelandic pop singer and songwriter.

After success in her home country and stints with the groups Urban K Loud, Munchie and Exodus, Alda moved to London and received a solo record contract with Wildstar Records, scoring two top 20 hit singles on the UK Singles Chart in 1998; "Real Good Time" and "Girls Night Out". Her debut album, Out of Alda, was also released in 1998.

== Discography ==
=== Albums ===
- Out of Alda (1998), CNR Music

=== Singles ===
with Urban K: Loud

- "Let Your Body Move (Charlie)" (1994), Three Big Cowboys

Solo

- "Real Good Time" (1998), Wildstar Records – UK No. 7
- "Girls Night Out" (1998), Wildstar Records – UK No. 20
