= Oh Aaron (song) =

Single by Aaron Carter featuring No Secrets & Nick Carter

from the album Oh Aaron
- Released: 2001
- Recorded: 2001
- Genre: Teen pop, pop rap, dance-pop
- Length: 3:17
- Label: Jive/Zomba
- Songwriters: Andy Goldmark, Josh Schwartz, Brian Kierulf
- Producers: Andy Goldmark, Josh Schwartz, Brian Kierulf

Aaron Carter singles chronology
"That's How I Beat Shaq" (2001)	"Oh Aaron" (2001)	"Not Too Young, Not Too Old" (2001)

"Oh Aaron" is a song by American singer Aaron Carter, released in 2001 as the lead single from his third studio album, Oh Aaron. Serving as the album’s opening track, it features guest appearances by the girl group No Secrets and singer Nick Carter of the Backstreet Boys. Lyrically, the song centers on Aaron obtaining tickets to a Backstreet Boys concert and was written and produced by Andy Goldmark, Josh Schwartz, and Brian Kierulf.

In terms of music critics, the song was described as a bubble-pop track with jump-rope-style raps that primarily appealed to a preteen audience, though some found it overly sweet and mildly grating. Reviewers also noted that Nick Carter's appearance could boost Aaron's profile. According to R&R "Oh Aaron" benefited from sustained airplay on Radio Disney during the second half of 2001.

== Song details ==
"Oh Aaron" is featured on Aaron Carter's 2001 album of the same name, serving as the opening track and featuring guest appearances by the girl group No Secrets and singer Nick Carter, his brother and a member of the Backstreet Boys. Written and produced by Andy Goldmark, Josh Schwartz, and Brian Kierulf, the track was released as the album's lead single, and was described by Pittsburgh Post-Gazette as "a novelty song about promising too many of his friends Backstreet Boys tickets (3,003) and then having to confront Nick with the request (he offers 'maybe a dozen')".

In a 2002 interview with Dan Aquilante of the New York Post, Carter said he was surprised when No Secrets was added to the song without his prior knowledge. Addressing the situation, he stated: "I felt like they used me to support another artist, and that's not right. I'm not their caretaker. I'm not here to support them. They should do their own thing and work for it like I did".

== Release and promotion ==
A promotional-only version of the single was serviced to Radio Disney. Carter emphasized his connection to the Backstreet Boys while promoting "Oh Aaron", referring to himself as "baby Backstreet" as he introduced the single.

=== Music video ===
The music video video was filmed in Toronto, and was directed by Andrew MacNaughtan. The video also featured appearances by Nick Carter and No Secrets, then newly signed to Jive Records. In the video, Aaron promises his friends (and parents and their friends) tickets to the Backstreet Boys' Black & Blue Tour, thinking Nick would hook him up. Nick agrees to at first, but when Aaron states that is 3,003 tickets, Nick disagrees. After some short begging, Nick agrees to-only if Aaron raps at his concert. Aaron later gets chased by fans on his way to the concert. He begs Nick to make him stay inside, but Nick carries him outside. At the end, Aaron is carried by tons of his fans. No Secrets sings the chorus of the song in different locations.

== Critical reception ==
In his review for Billboard, critic Chuck Taylor observed that the song "blends elements of bubble-pop with jump-rope raps", concluding that "'tweens love it, parents buy it, but it's not likely that many over 12—including top 40's target—will take to this sing-song, mildly grating effort". He added that the collaboration with his brother could nonetheless prove beneficial, remarking that "with the way things are going for Backstreet Boys, it can only boost the elder Carter's profile".

In a review published in the USA Today, Elysa Gardner commented on the single "Oh Aaron", writing that it was "an unctuous bit of kiddie calypso that pairs him with big brother Nick, a Backstreet Boy, on what sounds like a commercial for Backstreet's tour". Reviewing tha lbum Oh Aaron, Yushaimi Yahya of the Malay Mail wrote: "You get humiliated and insulted in the opener, 'Oh Aaron'. A pop piece fit for the recycle bin — although teeny-boppers, mind you, will love every second of it". He added, "Nick, of Backstreet Boys fame, lends his vocals here, but it's so sweet, loopy, and watery that it gets on your nerves and stays there for a long time".

== Commercial performance ==
The song received significant airplay on Radio Disney, where it appeared consistently on the network's weekly playlists from July through December 2001, according to R&R. During that period, it regularly logged 63 or more spins. According to Hits magazine the song peaked #2 in the Radio Disney at the week of August 17, 2001.

== Credits and personnel ==
Credits adapted from the liner notes of "Oh Aaron" single.

- Produced by Brian Kierulf and Josh Schwartz for KNS Productions, Inc. and Andy Goldmark for Zomba Recording Corporation
- Recorded by Brian Kierulf and Josh Schwartz at The J.O.U. (Jackson, NJ) and Battery Studios (New York, NY) and Chris DeSanto at Final Approach (Encino, CA)
- Mixed by Rich Travali at Chung King Studios (New York, NY)
- Assistant Engineers: Charles McCrorey, Rowie Nameri, John O’Mahony
- Programming: Brian Kierulf
- Background Vocals: No Secrets (Carly Lewis, Erin Tanner, Jade Gaspar, Jessica Fried, Angel Faith)
- Additional Vocals: Andy Goldmark, Jennifer Karr, Brian Kierulf, Audrey Martells, Josh Schwartz, Stacy Smith
- Scratches: Myles "Mad Myles" Schenkel (appears courtesy of Groovilicious Music, a division of Strictly Rhythm Records, LLC)

== Charts ==
Weekly chart performance for "Oh Aaron"
Chart (2001)	Peak position
US Top 50 MPS (Hits)	16
