= House of Carters =

2006 American reality television series

- Also known as: The Carters
- Starring: Nick Carter; Bobbie Jean "B.J." Carter; Leslie Carter; Angel Carter; Aaron Carter
- Opening theme: "Let It Go" by Nick Carter
- Country of origin: United States
- No. of seasons: 1
- No. of episodes: 8

Production
- Executive producer: Kenneth Crear
- Running time: 30 minutes

Original release
- Network: E!
- Release: October 1 – November 20, 2006

House of Carters is an American reality television series on E! in the United States and MuchMusic in Canada, about the lives of Backstreet Boys member, Nick Carter and his four younger full siblings reuniting in Los Angeles (while Carter was gearing up for the Backstreet Boys' sixth studio album Unbreakable) as they try to revive their careers as well as reconnect as a family. The series premiered on October 2, 2006. Eight episodes were ordered. The show starred Nick, Bobbie Jean "B.J.", Leslie, Angel, and Aaron Carter.

The show was parodied on Saturday Night Live on October 21, 2006, with Andy Samberg as Aaron Carter and Jason Sudeikis as Nick Carter.

The series ended after one season on November 20, 2006.

== Episodes ==
No.	Title	Original release date
1	"Welcome Back, Carter/Carter Dearest"	October 1, 2006
2	"Welcome Back, Carter/Carter Dearest"	October 1, 2006
3	"Carter Knows Best"	October 9, 2006
4	"Two of a Carter"	October 16, 2006
5	"Everybody Hates Carter"	October 23, 2006
6	"Carter's Anatomy"	November 6, 2006
7	"Hangin' With Mr. Carter"	November 13, 2006
8	"Good Night and Good Carter"	November 20, 2006
