= Popstar (film) =

- DVD cover
- Directed by: Richard Gabai
- Written by: Timothy Barton
- Produced by: Steve Austin; Michael Amato; Jonathan Bogner; David Borg; Nzinga Garvey; Greg McDonald; Lou Pearlman; Ray Skiptunis; Rena Tonelli
- Starring: Aaron Carter; Alana Austin; Kimberly Kevon Williams; Adrianne Palicki; Tracy Scoggins; Leif Garett; Vanessa Angel; Stella Stevens; Tom Bosley; David Cassidy
- Cinematography: Andrea V. Rossotto
- Edited by: Lawrence A. Maddox
- Music by: Michael Lloyd; Deeji Mincey; Boris Zelkin
- Production company: Tag Entertainment
- Distributed by: New Line Cinema
- Release date: November 8, 2005
- Running time: 94 minutes
- Country: United States
- Language: English

Popstar is a 2005 American film directed by Richard Gabai and written by Timothy Barton. The direct-to-video film features singer Aaron Carter in his only lead role with Alana Austin, Kimberly Kevon Williams, Adrianne Palicki, Tracy Scoggins, Leif Garett, Vanessa Angel, Stella Stevens, Tom Bosley and David Cassidy in his final film. It also featured Lou Pearlman's final performance before his prison sentence in 2008 and later death eight years later. The premiere was held in The Woodlands, Texas. Popstar was filmed in Calabasas, California, at A.C. Stelle Middle School and the Commons.

== Plot ==
Jane Brighton (Alana Austin) is a high school math whiz obsessed with J.D. McQueen (Aaron Carter), a teen music sensation whose parents have sent him back to public high school to improve his declining grades. J.D. risks missing a critical summer tour that could ruin his musical career. To get help with math, he builds a relationship with Jane.

== Cast ==
- Aaron Carter as J.D. McQueen
- Alana Austin as Jane Brighton
- Nicki Foxx as London
- David Cassidy as Grant
- Kimberly Kevon Williams as Abby Banks
- Adrianne Palicki as Whitney Addison
- Mary Elise Hayden as Bobette
- Deena Dill as Faith Brighton
- Andrew Stevens as Professor Brighton
- Natalia Livingston as Mary Brighton
- Leif Garrett as Janitor
- Tracy Scoggins as Judy McQueen
- Vanessa Angel as Diane
- Tom Bosley as Harvey
- Rachel Thorp as Samantha Brighton
- Rick Thomas as Mr. Overton
- Lou Pearlman as Spectator (uncredited)

== Soundtrack ==
The Popstar soundtrack was released October 18, 2005, and features Carter in "Saturday Night" (live), "Enuff Of Me", "I Want Candy" (live), "One Better" (live), and "Do You Remember" (live).
