= I'm All About You =

Single by Aaron Carter

from the album Oh Aaron
- Released: August 2001
- Recorded: 2001
- Genre: Teen pop
- Length: 3:41
- Label: Jive
- Songwriters: Andy Goldmark & Mark Mueller
- Producer: Andy Goldmark

Aaron Carter singles chronology
"Not Too Young, Not Too Old" (2001)	"I'm All About You" (2001)	"Leave It Up to Me" (2001)

"I'm All About You" is a song by American singer Aaron Carter, released in August 2001 as a single from his third studio album, Oh Aaron (2001). A mid-tempo pop ballad, it was later performed during Carter's Aaron's Winter Party tour and appeared in a remix version titled "A Lovely Day’s Remix", on a limited edition reissue of the album. The song was written by songwriters Andy Goldmark and Mark Mueller and was produced by Goldmark.

The song received attention in contemporary reviews, with some critics noting its more mature vocal tone compared to his earlier material. It also gained increased exposure on Top 40 radio in early 2002, reaching number one on the "Top 5 New & Active" section of the monitored airplay overview published by R&R.

== Release and promotion ==
The single was released on the week of August 11, 2001. A limited edition repackage of Oh Aaron included four additional tracks, among them the remix "A Lovely Day’s Remix" of "I'm All About You".

In the music video Carter is dancing and singing the song in a room. In a couple sub-plots, he is sitting with a girl eating dinner, in a limousine, and enters a nightclub. The video can be seen on the Oh Aaron: Live In Concert DVD.

The singer performed the song during his Aaron's Winter Party tour. SFGate called the song "the obligatory love-struck ballad" and wrote that during the live performance, Carter incorporated a brief reference to Steve Perry's "Oh Sherrie", figuratively "nicking the chorus" as a Bay Area shout-out. Sandy Low of StarShine magazine, also noted that during the performance, a "lucky girl" was brought onstage to be serenaded by the artist.

== Critical reception ==
In his review for Billboard, Chuck Taylor wrote that the song "reveals that Carter's voice is in the throes of changing", giving him "a raspy quality that surprisingly works in his favor". He suggested that the singer had "outgrown sounding like a kid", and concluded that the track "could be a secret-weapon record to keep an eye on".

The song was highlighted in reviews of Oh Aaron. Manila Standard praised the song, describing it as a "haunting ballad" and stating that the song was "expected to expand Aaron's audience". The newspaper added that the track was "one solid proof that he has arrived beyond the teenybopper zone". Karen Tye of the Herald Sun considered the track "better than his half-rap efforts", and described it as "the only song on which he displays any vocal capability".

== Commercial performance ==
In a February 23, 2002 report for Billboard, Ray Waddell noted that Aaron Carter was gaining broader radio exposure with "I'm All About You". Although Carter was described as "frowned upon by MTV and top 40 radio", his team expressed optimism about the single's performance, stating, "But we’ve had 20 add-ons for the new single, 'I'm All About You', and we’re thrilled to be on top 40 radio".

The song reached number one in the Top 5 of the "Top 5 New & Active" section on the monitored airplay overview dated March 22, 2002, published by R&R. According to Hits magazine the song peaked #10 in the Radio Disney at the week of May 10, 2002.

== Track listing ==
Promo - CD-Maxi Globo / Jive ZOM0016-2 (Sony)

1. I'm All About You (Radio Edit) 3:32
2. I'm All About You (A Lovely Day's Radio Mix) 3:56
3. I'm All About You (MZ's Club Radio Mix) 3:16
4. I'm All About You (A Lovely Day's Remix) 6:20
5. I'm All About You (MZ's Club Remix) 6:28

== Credits and personnel ==
Credits adapted from the liner notes of "I'm All About You" single.

Track 1

- Produced and arranged by Andy Goldmark for Zomba Recording Corporation.
- Recorded by Chris DeStefano at Final Approach (Encino, CA).
- Mixed by Rich Travali at Battery Studios (New York, NY).
- Assistant Engineer: Rich Tapper.
- Keyboard, Bass, Drums and Percussion Programming: Andy Goldmark, Chris DeStefano, Pete Amato.
- Guitar: Michael Thompson.
- Background Vocals: Aaron Carter, Marc Nelson.

Tracks 2, 3, 4 & 5

- Remix and Additional Production by Marco Zappala.
- Drum Programming by Marco Zappala.
- Keyboards by Marco Zappala & Iveles Santiago.
- Mixed by Marco Zappala at “My How-Z” Studio – RJ – Brazil.
