= 3D Friends =

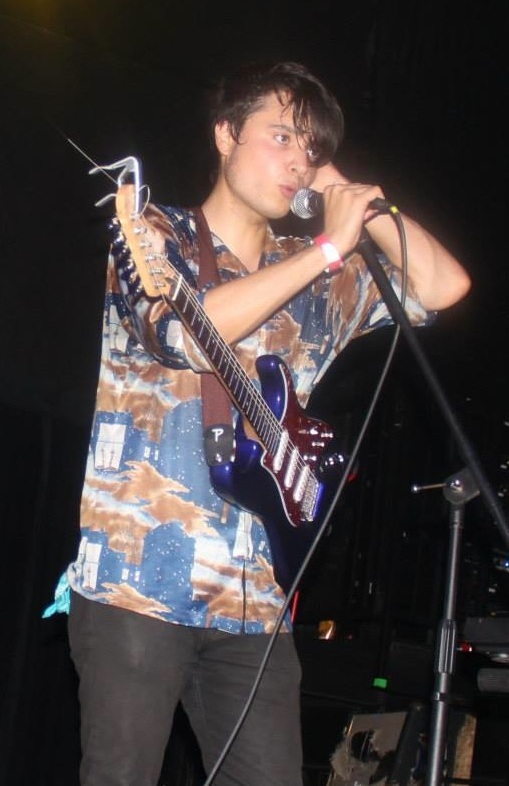
- 3D FRIENDS performing at MR Fest 2014 in San Marcos, TX

Background information
- Also known as: Dan Chavez Wright
- Born: July 2, 1989 (age 36); Houston, Texas, U.S.
- Origin: Austin, Texas; Los Angeles, California
- Genres: Indie rock, Dream pop, Ambient, Chillwave, Pop
- Years active: 2009–present
- Labels: Universal Music; Hype Music
- Website: 3d-friends.com

Daniel Chavez Wright (born July 2, 1989), known professionally as 3D Friends, is an American singer-songwriter and record producer from Austin, Texas. Daniel formed the project in 2009 as a solo project, but has collaborated with other musicians in the past. Wright was previously signed to Hype Music, a collaboration between Extreme Music and MTV.

Wright's single "Lina Magic" was chosen as the theme song for MTV's North American version of the hit television show Skins. His music has also been featured in many other MTV productions, notably the World of Jenks, Underemployed, The Pauly D Project, and Punk'd, in addition to ABC's Revenge and Bravo's Gallery Girls.

Wright's music style been compared to singer-songwriter Elliott Smith and Thomas Mars from the French alternative band Phoenix by the American radio journalist Nic Harcourt. He lists his influences as Destroyer and The Radio Dept.

== Discography ==
=== Studio albums ===
- Imaginative Things (2011)

=== EPs ===
- Time to Get Away (2010)
- The Way That It Goes (2011)
- Summer Break (2014)

=== With Aaron Carter ===
- "She Just Wanna Ride (feat. 3D Friends)" (2022, Single)
- "Feel Anything (feat. Twista, 3D Friends)" (2022, Single)
