= Aaron's Party (Come Get It) =

Studio album by Aaron Carter
- Released: September 26, 2000
- Recorded: 2000
- Genres: Pop; hip hop
- Length: 36:46
- Label: Jive
- Producers: Steve Mac; Steve Lunt; Timmy Allen; Larry "Rock" Campbell; Rose & Foster; Jimmy Bralower; Andy Goldmark; Paul Umbach

Aaron Carter chronology
Aaron Carter (1997)	Aaron's Party (Come Get It) (2000)	Oh Aaron (2001)

Singles from Aaron's Party (Come Get It)
- 1. "Aaron's Party (Come Get It)" Released: August 1, 2000; 2. "I Want Candy" Released: September 4, 2000; 3. "That's How I Beat Shaq" Released: January 6, 2001

Aaron's Party (Come Get It) is the second studio album by American pop singer Aaron Carter. It serves as the follow-up to his international debut album. Aaron's Party was released in the fall of 2000 becoming his first album under Jive Records. It includes the singles "Aaron's Party (Come Get It)", "I Want Candy", and "That's How I Beat Shaq". The album was also certified 3× platinum by the RIAA for selling over 3 million copies in the United States, making it Carter's most successful album.

== Synopsis ==
All of the songs on the standard album were separated by interludes, added in the pre-gaps of each song. Their lengths span from a one-second-long interlude titled "Let's Go" to a skit over a minute long titled "Teacher".

In some regions, "(Have Some) Fun with the Funk" (also available on the Pokémon: The First Movie soundtrack) and "Hang On Sloopy" were released as bonus tracks, bringing those releases' total number of songs to 14. Some releases of the album also have differences; instead of "Hang On Sloopy" as a bonus track, the UK edition included "Jump, Jump", which also featured on the test pressing of the album. The European version notably added "Life is a Party" (available on The Other Me soundtrack).

The Japanese edition (as well as having both bonus tracks and a spoken "Aaron Message") had a completely different album cover; some versions of this cover include it being completely orange apart from a circle around Carter's face at a party. The party cover is the main cover for some editions as well.

== Promotion and tour ==
The songs "Girl You Shine", "I Want Candy", "Aaron's Party (Come Get It)", "That's How I Beat Shaq", and "Bounce" were played frequently on Radio Disney whereas the videos of "I Want Candy", "That's How I Beat Shaq", "Aaron's Party (Come Get It)", and "Bounce" received heavy rotation on MTV, BET, VH1, Disney Channel and Nickelodeon. He also made several appearances on Nickelodeon and opened concerts for Britney Spears and the Backstreet Boys. Late in 2000, the album was certified platinum. One of his songs, "Iko Iko" was featured in the 2000 movie The Little Vampire, later included to the soundtrack album which is released ten days before the movie premiere. "Girl You Shine" was featured on Radio Disney Jams, Vol. 2 in early 2000. "Bounce" is featured on Radio Disney Jams, Vol. 4. Carter promoted his album by performing "I Want Candy" on Lizzie McGuire on March 13, 2001. That same month, he and fellow teen star Samantha Mumba performed at a concert held at Disney MGM Studios that aired on the Disney Channel titled Aaron Carter and Samantha Mumba in Concert. Carter's part of the concert can be seen on the DVD Aaron's Party: Live in Concert along with the music video of "That's How I Beat Shaq" along with clips of him at Disney World, his 13th birthday, and Carter recording his then-upcoming album Oh Aaron.

Carter embarked on the Aaron's Party Tour in the summer of 2001 with his sister and the A*Teens as the opening act.

== Critical reception ==
Professional ratings
Review scores
Source	Rating
AllMusic	2/5 stars
Entertainment Weekly	C−
Rolling Stone	2/5 stars

The album received mixed reviews from music critics.

Jon Azpiri from AllMusic gave the album two out of five stars and wrote that like "bubblegum acts of the past" the only value of the album is to be "pure kitsch" and the album being "the sort of album you look back on years after its release and mock with ironic glee".

David Browne from Entertainment Weekly described the album as "a collection of rhythmic, ultradisposable jingles delivered in the chirpy voice of its leading tyke" and gave the album a C−.

Rob Sheffield from Rolling Stone gave the album two out of five stars and wrote that Carter "discovers the thrills of impending puberty with a helping hand from "My Internet Girl" and chirps the least metaphorical version of "I Want Candy" ever". He also criticized the singer's voice, calling it "too Buffy" and "not Jody enough".

== Track listing ==
Aaron's Party (Come Get It) – Standard edition
No.	Title	Writer(s)	Length
1.	"Introduction: Come to the Party"		0:21
2.	"Aaron's Party (Come Get It)" ("Interlude: Candy Call" – 0:38)	Brian Kierulf; Josh Schwartz	3:24
3.	"I Want Candy" ("Interlude: Big Brother" – 0:27)	Bert Berns; Robert Feldman; Gerald Goldstein; Richard Gottehrer	3:13
4.	"Bounce" ("Interlude: Yes!" – 0:10)	Jodie Albert; Michelle Barber; Anika Bostelaar; Tim Hawes; Peter Kirtley; Linsey Martin; Nicola Stewart	3:19
5.	"My Internet Girl" ("Interlude: I Can See Her Voice" – 0:07)	Lee Curie; Georgie Dennis; Philip Nicholas	4:00
6.	"That's How I Beat Shaq" ("Interlude: Let's Go" – 0:01)	Kierulf; Schwartz; Thomas Slovinski	3:25
7.	"The Clapping Song" ("Interlude: Snappy Burger" – 0:46)	Lincoln Chase; Kay Werner; Sue Werner	2:58
8.	"Iko Iko" ("Interlude: Teacher" – 1:05)	James Crawford	2:41
9.	"Real Good Time" ("Interlude: Lunch at the Studio" – 0:34)	Malcolm Mehyer; Alda Björk Ólafsdóttir	3:14
10.	"Tell Me What You Want" ("Interlude: Stuffed!" – 0:06)	Lamont Dozier	3:12
11.	"Girl You Shine"	Gary Carolla; Jörgen Elofsson; Peter Landin; Kent Larsson	3:21
12.	"Interlude: Big Bad 'Shine-y' Beat Box"		0:27

European edition
No.	Title	Writer(s)	Length
11.	"Girl You Shine" ("Interlude: Big Bad 'Shine-y' Beat Box" – 0:27)	Gary Carolla; Jörgen Elofsson; Peter Landin; Kent Larsson	3:21
12.	"Life is a Party" (from the Disney Channel movie The Other Me)	Andy Goldman; James Dean Hicks; Jamie Houston	3:25

UK special edition
No.	Title	Writer(s)	Length
13.	"Jump Jump"	Deni Lew; Nicky Graham	2:37
14.	"(Have Some) Fun with the Funk"	Stephen Lunt	3:32

Japanese edition
No.	Title	Writer(s)	Length
6.	"The Clapping Song" ("Interlude: Snappy Burger" – 0:46)	Lincoln Chase; Kay Werner; Sue Werner	2:58
7.	"Iko Iko" ("Interlude: Teacher" – 1:05)	James Crawford	2:41
8.	"Real Good Time" ("Interlude: Lunch at the Studio" – 0:34)	Malcolm Mehyer; Alda Björk Ólafsdóttir	3:14
9.	"Tell Me What You Want" ("Interlude: Stuffed!" – 0:06)	Lamont Dozier	3:12
10.	"Jump Jump"	Deni Lew; Nicky Graham	2:37
11.	"Girl You Shine" ("Interlude: Big Bad 'Shine-y' Beat Box" – 0:27)	Gary Carolla; Jörgen Elofsson; Peter Landin; Kent Larsson	3:21
12.	"Life is a Party"	Andy Goldman; James Dean Hicks; Jamie Houston	3:25
13.	"(Have Some) Fun with the Funk"	Stephen Lunt	3:32
14.	"Hang on Sloopy"	Berns; Wes Farrell	3:21

On most CD editions, each interlude was placed in the pre-gap before the following track, while on others, the interludes are placed as their own separate tracks.

== Charts ==
=== Weekly charts ===
Weekly chart performance for Aaron's Party (Come Get It)
Chart (2000)	Peak position
Australian Albums (ARIA)	97
Canadian Albums (RPM)	54
Dutch Albums (Album Top 100)	76
German Albums (Offizielle Top 100)	82
Swedish Albums (Sverigetopplistan)	57
US Billboard 200	4

=== Year-end charts ===
2000 year-end chart performance for Aaron's Party (Come Get It)
Chart (2000)	Position
Canadian Albums (Nielsen SoundScan)	171

2001 year-end chart performance for Aaron's Party (Come Get It)
Chart (2001)	Position
US Billboard 200	35

== Certifications ==
Certifications for Aaron's Party (Come Get It)
Region	Certification	Certified units/sales
Canada (Music Canada)	Gold	50,000^{^}
United States (RIAA)	3× Platinum	3,000,000^{^}
^{^} Shipments figures based on certification alone.
