= Not Too Young, Not Too Old =

Single by Aaron Carter featuring Nick Carter

from the album Oh Aaron
- Released: September 3, 2001
- Recorded: 2001
- Genre: Pop rap; dance-pop; teen pop
- Length: 3:07
- Label: Jive
- Songwriters: Mickey Power; Lucas Secon; Lena Palmer; Vanya Raeburn; Amanda Lindsey; Simone Williams
- Producers: Scorpio; Mystery

Aaron Carter singles chronology
"Oh Aaron" (2001)	"Not Too Young, Not Too Old" (2001)	"I'm All About You" (2001)

"Not Too Young, Not Too Old" is a pop song recorded by singer Aaron Carter. Produced by Scorpio and Mystery, the track was released in September 2001 as the second single off Carter's third album Oh Aaron. "Not Too Young, Not Too Old" is Carter's second song to feature vocals from his older brother Nick, who sings the chorus and the bridge. The song failed to appear on any Billboard charts but managed to reach number 80 in Australia.

== Critica reception ==
The Manila Standard wrote: "Aaron Carter has matured as a performer in this slick and sexy tune"

== Sample used ==
The song samples "Strictly Rollin'" by First Class and uses the Auto-Tune effect.

== Music video ==
A music video was produced to promote the single and was directed by Andrew MacNaughtan (who previously directed three other Aaron Carter videos). The video features Aaron and his brother fooling around with each other and with girls while dancing in front of a big neon sign of Aaron's name.

== Live performances ==
Aaron performed the song by himself on the Nickelodeon show All That during the first episode of Season 7. He performed the song with his brother at the 2001 Teen Choice Awards where Aaron, dressed in a combat outfit, performed on a life-size record player and Nick coming out as a bohemian pirate.

== Credits and personnel ==
Credits adapted from the liner notes of Oh Aaron.

Recording

- Recorded at Westlake Audio, Los Angeles
- Recorded and mixed at Battery Studios, New York

Personnel

- Scorpio – producer
- Mystery – producer
- Bill Malina – recording engineer
- Chris Trevett – recording engineer, mix engineer
- Rowie Nameri – assistant recording engineer
- Jason Rankins – assistant recording engineer
- Larry "Rock" Campbell – all instruments
- Taylur Davis – background vocals
- Dana Williams – background vocals
- Davida Williams – background vocals

== Chart performance ==
Chart (2001)	Peak position
Australia (ARIA)	80
