= Another Earthquake! =

Studio album by Aaron Carter
- Released: September 3, 2002
- Recorded: 2002
- Genre: Teen pop; pop rap; dance-pop; pop rock
- Length: 41:47
- Label: Jive
- Producer: Martin Bushell; Nick Cook; Jeff Coplan; Phil Dane; Kenny Gioia; Andy Goldmark; Alexander Greggs; Lucas; Tony Momrelle; Danny O'Donoghue; Kevin Paige; Riprock; Mark Sheehan; Sheppard

Aaron Carter chronology
Oh Aaron (2001)	Another Earthquake! (2002)	Most Requested Hits (2003)

Singles from Another Earthquake
- 1. "Another Earthquake!" Released: August 3, 2002; 2. "Summertime" Released: November 23, 2002; 3. "To All the Girls" Released: March 12, 2003; 4. "Do You Remember" Released: May 31, 2003

Another Earthquake! is the fourth studio album by American teen pop singer Aaron Carter, released on September 3, 2002. The album continued Carter's early-2000s teen pop sound, combining dance-pop tracks, hip hop influences, and pop ballads aimed at a young audience. To promote the record, Carter embarked on the Rock, Rap and Retro Tour, with Jump 5, No Secrets, and Triple Image serving as opening acts. Commercially, the album debuted at number 18 on the Billboard 200 chart, and became Carter's final studio album released under Jive Records.

== Backgound and release ==
Carter said that he was unaware that Baha Men would be featured on "Summertime" until after the collaboration had already been arranged. He stated: "I felt like they used me to support another artist, and that’s not right. I'm not their caretaker. I'm not here to support them. They should do their own thing and work for it like I did".

The singer promoted the album on the Rock, Rap and Retro Tour, with Jump 5, No Secrets, and Triple Image as opening acts.

== Critical reception ==
Professional ratings
Review scores
Source	Rating
AllMusic	4/5 stars
Nando Times	3/5 stars

AllMusic considered it "his best album to date" and "an overlooked hidden treasure of the teen pop movement of the early 2000s", while noting that the record remained enjoyable "despite Carter's voice". Entertainment Weekly joked that the album found the singer "by turns, a sensitive boyfriend" and "a warrior for the downtrodden", while noting that "Funky A rips off Nelly's 'Ride Wit Me' and most of the Will Smith oeuvre", making him "an even more credible white-rap threat than LFO". The Nando Times considered it "a perfectly reasonable follow-up" to Aaron Carter's earlier albums, highlighting songs like "My First Ride" as "spirited" and noting that the singer "shows maturity" on tracks such as "When It Comes to You" and "Summertime".

Yahoo! wrote that the album is filled with "aerobic beats, good-time feelings and tons of hooks", comparing its teen pop sound to "a steady diet of candy and soda". The Pittsburgh Post-Gazette criticized the album for its "ill-advised" attempts at rap and overly commercial teen-pop sound, though it noted that the album improved on ballads like "Keep Believing" and guitar-pop tracks such as "To All The Girls", praising Carter for understanding his young audience. The New Straits Times described it as "serviceable-pop with tightly coiled grooves" and said that its songs were "as engaging as they are frothy", while criticizing the album's "90s-style pop sterility". In another review, the same journal described Another Earthquake! as "a fantastic voyage filled with spirited songs and infectious grooves", praising its "sturdy" songwriting and stating that it was "the first Aaron Carter album that's actually fun for the intended audience", calling it "his best album to date".

== Commercial performance ==
The album made its chart debut at number 18 on the US Billboard 200 (with 41,000 units sold), but fell to number 41 (21,000 units) in its second week. This album was much less successful than Oh Aaron, and would be Carter's third and final studio album with Jive Records.

== Track listing ==
Another Earthquake! track listing
No.	Title	Writer(s)	Length
1.	"Another Earthquake!"	Power, Lucas Secon	2:51
2.	"To All the Girls"	Sheppard, Rich Cronin, Kenny Gioia	3:26
3.	"Summertime" (featuring Baha Men)	Nicky Cook, Tony Momrelle, Martin Bushell	3:50
4.	"My First Ride"	Power, Secon	3:09
5.	"Do You Remember"	Danny O'Donoghue, Mark Mueller, Mark Sheehan	3:58
6.	"2 Good 2 B True"	Cook, Suzi Thurston, Phil Dane, Bushell	3:32
7.	"When It Comes to You"	Kevin Paige, Veit Renn	3:38
8.	"America A O"	Power, Secon, Alan Ross	3:29
9.	"Without You (There'd Be No Me)"	Cook, Ben Coplan, Momrelle, Bushell	2:57
10.	"Keep Believing"	Andy Goldmark, Mueller	3:15
11.	"Sugar"	Brad Daymond, Alex Greggs, Goldmark	2:49
12.	"Nick Snippets"		4:38
13.	"You Get to My Heart" (bonus track)	Goldmark, Mueller	3:04

== Singles ==
- "Another Earthquake!"
- "Summertime" (featuring Baha Men)
- "To All the Girls"
- "Do You Remember"

== Charts ==
Weekly chart performance for Another Earthquake!
Chart (2002)	Peak position
Japanese Albums (Oricon)	55
US Billboard 200	18
