= The Other Me (2000 film) =

2000 film directed by Manny Coto

- Promotional advertisement
- Based on: Me Two by Mary C. Ryan
- Written by: Jeff Schechter
- Directed by: Manny Coto
- Starring: Andrew Lawrence; Mark L. Taylor; Lori Hallier; Alison Pill; Brenden Jefferson; Sarah Gadon
- Theme music composer: Mark Mothersbaugh
- Country of origin: United States
- Original language: English

Production
- Producer: Diane Gutterud
- Cinematography: Derek Rogers
- Editor: Terry Strokes
- Running time: 84 minutes
- Production company: Alan Sacks Productions

Original release
- Network: Disney Channel
- Release: September 8, 2000

The Other Me is a 2000 American science fiction comedy film released as a Disney Channel Original Movie about a teenager who accidentally clones himself as a genius and ends up using his clone to pass school. The movie is the 21st Disney Channel Original Movie and is based on the book Me Two by Mary C. Ryan.

== Plot ==
Academically struggling high-schooler Will Browning is threatened by his father to be sent to a strict summer camp designed to instill discipline and responsibility. Desperate to improve his grades, Will orders a science kit, hoping to base a project on it. Unbeknownst to him, the kit has been contaminated by a cloning formula developed by greedy scientists Conrad and Victor.

Will inadvertently clones himself, names his duplicate Twoie, and has him attend school in his place. Twoie proves to be curious, socially bold, and emotionally intelligent, reconciling with Will’s long-time rival and becoming popular among students and teachers alike. He agrees to go to an upcoming dance with Will's crush Heather. During a visit to Will's unsociable grandfather Mordechai, Twoie manages to draw Mordechai out of his shell. Meanwhile, Will is initially delighted to stay in his room and relax all day, but quickly grows bored.

Impressed with his apparent improvement, Will's parents abandon their plans to send him to summer camp. Will is jealous of Twoie's social success, and the latter speculates that Will's fear of looking foolish is holding him back. Sensing he is no longer needed, Twoie resolves to leave town after the dance, which he attends. Conrad and Victor, who had been spying on Will, are overheard by him as they discuss how Twoie will deteriorate soon if he does not ingest a stabilizing formula.

Will steals the formula and heads to the dance with the scientists in pursuit. There, Twoie excuses himself as he starts to weaken, and Will puts aside his fears to improvise a dance move that is a hit with his schoolmates. However, he fails to find Twoie and is captured by the scientists, who mistake him for a clone. Twoie almost leaves town, but senses Will is in trouble, and rescues him. After subduing the scientists with help from their friends, Will administers the stabilizing formula to Twoie, saving his life.

The scientists are arrested, and Will passes off Twoie as his identical cousin Gil to avoid questioning by the police. At home, Will explains the truth to his family, who welcome his clone to live with them.

== Cast ==
- Andrew Lawrence as:
  - Will Browning
  - Twoie / Gil Pupman, Will's clone and ostensible cousin
- Mark L. Taylor as Patrick Browning, Will's father
- Lori Hallier as Kathryn Browning, Will's mother
- Alison Pill as Allana Browning, Will's older sister
- Brenden Jefferson as Chuckie, Will's best friend
- Joe Grifasi as Conrad
- Scott McCord as Victor
- Tyler Hynes as Scottie DeSota, Will's rival and eventual friend
- Sarah Gadon as Heather Johnson, Will's crush
- Robert Buck as Grandpa Mordechai, Will's grandfather
- Andrea Garnett as Miss Pinkerson
- Joseph Motiki as V.J.

== Soundtrack ==
No.	Title	Artist(s)	Length
1.	"Crucial Part 2"	Stanley A. Smith
2.	"Winners Circle"	Stanley A. Smith
3.	"You Can Do It"	The Sha Shees	3:53
4.	"In The Stream"	Stanley A. Smith
5.	"Everything (Feels Like New)"	Alexz Johnson
6.	"Bringin' Da Noise"	NSYNC	3:31
7.	"I Dream of You"	KEF	4:21
8.	"Life is a Party"	Aaron Carter	3:26
9.	"Just Can't Wait"	Jamie Dunlap & Scott Nickoley
10.	"I Feel Strange"	Maureen Steel

== Awards ==
=== Young Artist Awards (2001) ===
==== Won ====
- Best Performance in a TV Movie (Comedy) – Leading Young Actor
  - Andrew Lawrence
- Best Performance in a TV Movie (Comedy) – Supporting Young Actor
  - Tyler Hynes

==== Nominated ====
- Best Ensemble in a TV Movie
  - Andrew Lawrence, Brenden Jefferson, Tyler Hynes, Sarah Gadon, and Alison Pill
