= Leave It Up to Me =

Single by Aaron Carter

from the album Oh Aaron and Jimmy Neutron: Boy Genius soundtrack
- Released: November 20, 2001
- Recorded: 2001
- Genre: Teen pop, pop rap, dance-pop
- Length: 2:59
- Label: Jive; Nick
- Songwriters: L. Secon; M. Power

Aaron Carter singles chronology
"I'm All About You" (2002)	"Leave It Up to Me" (2001)	"Another Earthquake" (2002)

Music video
- "Leave It Up to Me" on YouTube

"Leave It Up to Me" is a song by Aaron Carter taken from his third studio album Oh Aaron. It served as the lead single from Paramount/Nickelodeon's Jimmy Neutron: Boy Genius soundtrack. Carter performed two other songs along with this on the soundtrack, "A.C.'s Alien Nation" and "Go Jimmy Jimmy."

== Music video ==
The music video opens with Carter in a boring tour of a space museum. As the tour guide instructs him and the rest of his classmates to move onwards, Carter stumbles near a door to a restricted area. He enters it as his clothes morph into a futuristic outfit. Throughout the video, Carter sits in a chair near a control console and a stellar map that shows him singing. Among the buttons on the console is one that turns him CGI while singing with a group of men in black. While performing the song, Carter glances over near the screen, only to realize it's displaying a countdown warning about it self-destructing. Carter jumps and aborts it just in time, as the picture zooms out to black.

An alternate version of the music video was featured on the VHS and DVD release of Jimmy Neutron: Boy Genius, where film clips are shown on the control screen instead of Carter singing. At the very end, instead of the picture zooming out, an explosion is shown with Jimmy on his rocket zooming by.

== Charts ==
Chart (2002)	Peak position
Scotland Singles (OCC)	24
UK Singles (OCC)	22
UK Indie (OCC)	5
