= Oh Aaron =

Studio album by Aaron Carter
- Released: August 7, 2001
- Recorded: 2000–2001
- Studios: The Dojo (Jackson, New Jersey); Battery Studios (New York City); Final Approach (Encino, California); Chung King Studios (New York); Westlake Audio (Los Angeles); Enterprise Studios (Burbank, California); Rose & Foster Studios (London)
- Genres: Teen pop; pop rap; dance-pop
- Length: 33:47
- Label: Jive
- Producers: Brian Kierulf; Josh Schwartz; Andy Goldmark; Scorpio; Mystery; Rose & Foster; Nate "Billionheir" Butler; Todd "Boogie" Terrell

Aaron Carter chronology
| Aaron's Party (Come Get It) (2000) | Oh Aaron (2001) | Another Earthquake! (2002) |

Singles from Oh Aaron
- 1. "Oh Aaron" Released: August 6, 2001; 2. "Not Too Young, Not Too Old" Released: September 3, 2001; 3. "I'm All About You" Released: August 2001; 4. "Leave It Up to Me" Released: November 20, 2001

Oh Aaron is the third studio album by American teen pop singer Aaron Carter, released in the summer of 2001 as his second album through Jive Records. The album features three collaborations with No Secrets and his older brother Nick. Despite receiving mixed reviews and not being as successful internationally as his second album, it found success in the US, peaking at number seven and being certified Platinum by the RIAA, and subsequently becoming Aaron's second top 10 album and second platinum-selling album.

Oh Aaron was accompanied by a concert DVD of the same name, which was released on March 26, 2002, and included footage of his 2001 concert in Baton Rouge, Louisiana, as well as music videos and interviews.

Play Along Toys also created an Aaron Carter action figure in conjunction with the album's release.

== Singles ==
- "Oh Aaron": the title song, opening track, and first single features his older brother Nick Carter of the Backstreet Boys and pop girl group No Secrets. The song talks about Aaron getting tickets to a Backstreet Boys concert. In the video, filmed in Toronto, Aaron promises his friends (and parents and their friends) tickets to the Backstreet Boys concert, thinking Nick would hook him up. Nick initially agrees, but reneges when Aaron states that is 3,003 tickets. After some short begging, Nick acquiesces, but only if Aaron raps at his concert. Aaron later gets chased by fans on his way to the concert. He begs Nick to make him stay inside, but Nick carries him outside. At the end, Aaron is carried by tons of his fans. No Secrets sings the chorus of the song in different locations.
- "Not Too Young, Not Too Old"
- "I'm All About You": the third and final single of the album. In the video, Aaron is dancing and singing the song in a room. In a couple sub-plots, Aaron is sitting with a girl eating dinner, in a limousine, and enters a nightclub. The video can be seen on the Oh Aaron: Live In Concert DVD.

== Critical reception ==
Professional ratings
Review scores
| Source | Rating |
|---|---|
| AllMusic | 2/5 stars |
| Entertainment Weekly | C− |
| USA Today | 1.5/5 stars |
| Dotmusic | 2/5 stars |

AllMusic's Stephen Thomas Erlewine argued that the album remained "clearly directed at kids but written with distinctly adolescent, even adult, overtones", criticizing its "cut and paste commercialism", the producers' tendency to borrow from multiple genres, and the album's "disturbing pandering", while also condemning its overt promotional content as "crass". Beth Johnson from Entertainment Weekly said about the record, "Preteens across the country can rejoice: 13-year-old cutie-pie Aaron Carter has released his second sing-along album in less than a year. Apparently A.C. (as he name-checks himself) knows what his fans like: cheery BSB/'N Sync-style raps, puppy-love ballads, and songs with "You" in the title (there are four of them). As harmless (for kids) as it is unlistenable (for adults)". USA Today criticized Oh Aaron, describing the title track as "an unctuous bit of kiddie calypso" and arguing that several songs were "similarly flimsy" and "hyperactive", comparing them to "jingles for Ritalin".

Entertainment Tonight described the album as "another mix of playful raps about girls, growing up and just plain having fun", and noted that it revealed "a little more mature" side of the singer, while Plugged In considered it "better than" Aaron's Party (Come Get It), stating that "it won't change the world, but there's something refreshing about music that uses youthful enthusiasm to express respect for family members and a willingness to do chores". Music-Reviewer described it as "a great party album for kids", praising its "upbeat and catchy" songs and awarding it an "A+ for its clean lyrics and positive messages", while also calling it "a very commercially contrived album" with "catchy hooks and cheesy lyrics" and criticizing Carter's attempts to adapt to "the new hip hop rapcore movement". Dotmusic considered it "a significant step on" from Carter's earlier work, praising "I'm All About You" as "relatively listenable", but criticizing the album's "13 chirpy pop tracks" and calling the title track "excruciatingly bad", ultimately concluding: "Unless you're under the age of six – avoid".

In their look at the Least Essential Albums of 2001, The A.V. Club awarded Oh Aaron the title of Least Essential Awkward Adolescence, with Stephen Thompson saying, "[A]ppearing to have aged about five years since 2000's Aaron's Party (Come Get It) and now possessing a voice that's gone from chirpy to unsure, the singer/rapper seems ill-suited for inching his way into artistic relevance as he begins to sprout facial hair and think about muscle cars."

== Track listing ==
Oh Aaron track listing
| No. | Title | Writer(s) | Producer(s) | Length |
|---|---|---|---|---|
| 1. | "Oh Aaron" (featuring Nick Carter and No Secrets) | Andy Goldmark, Josh Schwartz, Brian Kierulf | Kierulf, Schwartz, Goldmark | 3:17 |
| 2. | "Not Too Young, Not Too Old" (featuring Nick Carter) | Mickey Power, Lucas Secon, Lena Palmer, Vanya Raeburn, Amanda Lindsey, Simone Williams | Scorpio, Mystery | 3:08 |
| 3. | "Stride (Jump on the Fizzy)" (featuring No Secrets) | Schwartz, Kierulf, Matthew Wilder, Greg Prestopino | Kierulf, Schwartz | 3:15 |
| 4. | "Come Follow Me" | Power, Secon | Scorpio, Mystery | 3:05 |
| 5. | "I Would" | Goldmark, Schwartz, Kierulf | Kierulf, Schwartz, Goldmark | 3:07 |
| 6. | "Baby It's You" | Nicky Cook, Phil Dane, Martin Bushell, Ben Copeland | Rose & Foster | 3:06 |
| 7. | "I'm All About You" | Goldmark, Mark Mueller | Goldmark | 3:41 |
| 8. | "The Kid in You" | Butler, Goldmark | Goldmark, Butler | 3:25 |
| 9. | "Hey You" | Cook, Dane, Copeland | Rose & Foster | 2:55 |
| 10. | "Cowgirl (Lil' Mama)" | Todd Terrell | Terrell | 3:37 |
| 11. | "Aaron Carter Spoken ID" | | | 1:25 |

Notes

- "Come Follow Me" was featured in the extended trailer for Hey Arnold! The Movie.
- "Stride (Jump on the Fizzy)" contains a sample from "Break My Stride" written by Matthew Wilder and Greg Prestopino.
- The Australian edition includes two bonus tracks before the interview with Aaron as tracks 11 and 12, "Get Up on Ya Feet" and "One for the Summer". The former song appears on the soundtrack to the Disney Channel series Kim Possible.
- The Korean edition of the album included only "Get Up on Ya Feet". A Korean special edition included a bonus VCD with the music videos of "Oh Aaron", "Not Too Young, Not Too Old", "I'm All About You", and the song and music video for Aaron's promotional song featured in Jimmy Neutron: Boy Genius, "Leave It Up to Me". It also featured an interview with Aaron along with brother Nick, and a look behind the scenes of the filming of the video for "I'm All About You".
- Other Asian editions were special releases featuring most of the songs from Aaron's debut album as "bonus tracks". A similar concept was employed on an Eastern European edition, which featured several tracks from Aaron's Party (as well as a remix of the title track and another song from around the time, "Everybody Stand Up"), two songs from Aaron's debut, "Leave It Up to Me" from Jimmy Neutron and another song by Aaron's on the soundtrack, "A.C.'s Alien Nation". This edition contains several misspellings and what seem to be repeats of several tracks already on the album.

== Personnel ==
Vocals

- Aaron Carter – lead vocals (all tracks), background vocals (5, 7, 8)
- No Secrets – background vocals
- Andy Goldmark – additional vocals (1), background vocals (8)
- Jennifer Karr – additional vocals (1, 3)
- Brian Kierulf – additional vocals (1, 3)
- Audrey Martells – additional vocals (1)
- Josh Schwartz – additional vocals (1, 3), background vocals (5)
- Stacy Smith – additional vocals (1, 3)
- Nate "Billionheir" Butler – background vocals (8)
- Taylur Davis – background vocals (2)
- Marc Nelson – background vocals (7, 8)
- Tony T – background vocals (6, 9)
- Todd "Boogie" Terrell – background vocals (4, 10)
- Dana Williams – background vocals (2)
- Davida Williams – background vocals (2)

Instrumentation

- Brian Kierulf – guitar
- Josh Schwartz – guitar
- Paul Gendler – guitar (6, 9)
- Michael Thompson – guitar (7)
- Blake Eiseman – guitar (10)
- Mike Hartnett – bass (10)
- Myles 'Mad Myles' Schneit – scratches (1, 3)

Production

- Charles McCrorey – assistant engineer (1)
- Rowie Nameri – assistant engineer (1, 2, 4, 8, 10)
- John O'Mahony – assistant engineer (1, 3)
- Jason Rankins – assistant engineer (2)
- Rich Tapper – assistant engineer (4, 5, 7, 10)
- Tony Zeller – assistant engineer (10)
- Rich Travali – mixing (1, 3, 5, 7)
- Chris Trevett – mixing (2, 4, 10)
- Bob Kraushaar – mixing (6, 9)
- Brian Kierulf – programming
- Chaz Harper – mastering

Artwork

- Nick Gamma – art direction and design
- Robert Ascroft – photography

== Charts ==
=== Weekly charts ===
Weekly chart performance for Oh Aaron
| Chart (2001–2002) | Peak position |
|---|---|
| Canadian Albums (Nielsen SoundScan) | 33 |
| Japanese Albums (Oricon) | 73 |
| UK Independent Albums (Official Charts) | 31 |
| US Billboard 200 | 7 |

=== Year-end charts ===
Year-end chart performance for Oh Aaron
| Chart (2001) | Position |
|---|---|
| US Billboard 200 | 153 |
| Chart (2002) | Position |
| US Billboard 200 | 144 |

== Certifications ==
Certifications for Oh Aaron
| Region | Certification | Certified units/sales |
|---|---|---|
| United States (RIAA) | Platinum | 1,000,000^{^} |
^{^} Shipments figures based on certification alone.
