= That's How I Beat Shaq =

Single by Aaron Carter

from the album Aaron's Party (Come Get It)
- Released: January 6, 2001
- Genre: Pop rap
- Length: 3:25
- Label: Jive
- Songwriters: Brian Kierulf; Joshua M. Schwartz; Thomas Slovinski

Aaron Carter singles chronology
"I Want Candy" (2000)	"That's How I Beat Shaq" (2001)	"Oh Aaron" (2001)

Music video
- "That's How I Beat Shaq" on YouTube

"That's How I Beat Shaq" is a single from Aaron Carter's second album, Aaron's Party (Come Get It). Released in 2001, the single was released with the permission of Shaquille O'Neal.

== Background ==
According to Shaquille O'Neal, he first became acquainted with the Carter family in the early 1990s, when Backstreet Boys recorded an early demo at his home studio. "One of my worst mistakes ever was not signing the Backstreet Boys", he reflected, noting that they "recorded their first album in my house" and that he charged them "$5 an hour" for studio time. O'Neal added that he "knew the Carters very well", as Aaron would frequently visit. During one of those visits, the two played a game of H-O-R-S-E, which Carter won. "We had a H-O-R-S-E game one day and he beat me! And then, he came back and said, 'I want to do a song'. And I said sure," O'Neal stated, also agreeing to appear in the accompanying music video.

== Music video ==
The video begins with Aaron riding a scooter with a dog playing Frisbee, followed by various scenes of Aaron playing basketball. It then shifts to him telling the story of how he met Shaquille O'Neal, who challenges him to a one-on-one basketball game. In the second verse, Aaron plans to distract Shaq in order to score points. Aaron finally emerges victorious, but it turns out that everything was a dream when Aaron hears his mother's voice. He is shocked, however, when he sees the jersey of Shaquille O'Neal. Throughout the video, Aaron is seen rapping in the basketball court and in the hoop.

== Reception ==
Professional ratings
Review scores
Source	Rating
AllMusic	1.5/5 stars

In 2002, Billboard included the song in the list of best "10 Slammin' Songs for the All-Star Game".

== In popular culture ==
The March 7, 2013, episode of Upload with Shaquille O'Neal features O'Neal challenging Carter to a rematch, which O'Neal dominates.

The song was sampled and remixed in "Aaron" by Neil Cicierega, who previously referenced the song in his 2005 song "The Ultimate Showdown of Ultimate Destiny," in which Aaron Carter and Shaquille O'Neal get into a fight.

== Track listing ==
Single – Aaron Carter – "That's How I Beat Shaq" (2001, CD)

1. "That's How I Beat Shaq" – 3:24
2. "One for the Summer" – 3:44

== Charts ==
Weekly chart performance for "That's How I Beat Shaq"
Chart (2001)	Peak position
US Billboard Hot 100	96
U.S. Billboard Hot 100 Singles Sales	12
