= No Secrets (group) =

American girl group (2000–2005)

- Origin: Los Angeles, California, U.S.
- Genres: Pop; teen pop; dance-pop; R&B
- Years active: 2000–2005
- Label: Jive
- Past members: Angel Faith; Jessica Fried; Carly Lewis; Jade Ryusaki; Erin Tanner

No Secrets was an American girl group formed in 2000. The group consisted of five members: Angel Faith, Carly Lewis, Erin Tanner, Jessica Fried, and Jade Ryusaki. The group debuted in the United States in 2001 with the single "Kids in America".

== History ==
=== 2000–2002: Formation, debut album and tour ===
No Secrets was formed by Carly's father, Adrian Gurvitz, a music producer from London. She wrote a letter to him asking to put a group together. Soon after, Jade was invited; Carly and Jade's mothers were friends. Erin, Jade's cousin, joined next. Later, the three girls found Angel in an advertisement for a singing group; she joined, bringing Jessica with her. Once the group line-up had been completed, No Secrets began recording songs for their debut album. The girls worked with a variety of producers and songwriters, including Adrian Gurvitz, Andy Goldmark, and Riprock 'n' Alex G. The process took a number of months. They took a break from recording and album prep to go touring and promoting their group. In July 2001, No Secrets joined Aaron Carter in Toronto for the shooting of his video "Oh Aaron" and provided backing vocals for the song. They were also featured in another track of off his album, "Stride (Jump on the Fizzy)." In 2002, after touring with Carter for four months, they filmed their first video, the home VHS and DVD release No Secrets - Get to Know Us, and resumed work on their album.

Later that year, the group released their self-titled debut album, with singles "That's What Girls Do" and "Kids in America." The latter was featured in the soundtrack for the 2001 film Jimmy Neutron: Boy Genius and its music video was included as a bonus for the film's VHS release. "That's What Girls Do" played in the end credits of The Powerpuff Girls Movie, and its music video was a bonus feature on the DVD. The song would later be used in The Hot Chick. They also recorded "Little Angel of Mine" for the soundtrack of Stuart Little 2.

=== 2002–2004: Faith's departure and Friends Forever ===
The No Secrets cover of "Kiss the Girl" from the 1989 film The Little Mermaid OST was featured on the 2002 release of the Disneymania compilation album.

Soon after singing the majority of leads in the band, Angel left the group to pursue a solo career, releasing the album Believe in Angels Believe in Me in 2004, just as the finishing touches were being put on No Secrets' second album, Friends Forever. The album was released with Angel featured in the artwork because it was too close to the release date and too far in production to make any changes. The four remaining members recorded and shot a video for the song "Once Upon (Another) Dream" for Disney's 2003 DVD release of Sleeping Beauty. At one point, many rumors floated about a new member joining the girl group, but no official statements were ever made. Until blog posts and other articles were created a few years later stating, Lady Gaga was confirmed to promptly replace Angel in late 2003 but after her manager backed out of the project too early, Gaga (then known as Stefani) didn't make it into the group.

=== 2005: Break-up and future ===
Disagreements between the remaining four members of the group led to the eventual break-up of No Secrets in March 2005.

==== Post No Secrets ====
===== Jessica Fried =====
In 2006, Jessica Fried took on a solo career, signing with Reprise Records under the name Jessi Malay. Her first single, “Gimme” featuring Lil Scrappy, was produced by J.R. Rotem. In a 2007 interview, Fried commented on the break-up, stating that the girls got along great but greedy parental actions ended up breaking the group apart.

Currently, Jessi is an established fashion and lifestyle influencer, with over 1.2K followers across Instagram, YouTube and TikTok. In September of 2021, Jessi launched Haven Namai, a home care line with five signature candles. She currently is partnered with Macy’s to curate seasonal looks, styling recommendations and favorite items.

===== Erin Tanner =====
Erin Tanner adopted the stage name Nicki Foxx and began working on solo material.

===== Angel Faith =====
In 2007, Angel Faith retired from the entertainment industry and began pursuing an education. In June 2009, she graduated magna cum laude from UCLA and went on to complete a doctorate degree in clinical psychology at Pepperdine University.

===== Jade Ryusaki =====
In 2012, Jade, alongside her mother — launched Lotus & Lime; a sustainable Japanese and Hawaiian fashion brand. In 2024, Ryusaki married The Laylow Waikiki hotel general manager, Ben Buckley. In 2025, they welcomed their first daughter.

===== Carly Lewis =====
In 2017, Carly married Nathan Fields, son of supermodel Janice Dickinson and British TV producer, Simon Fields. Carly is currently Director of VIP & Client Relations at Alice + Olivia.

== Members ==
Member	2000	2001	2002	2003	2004	2005
Angel Faith						
Carly Lewis						
Erin Tanner						
Jade Ryusaki						
Jessica Fried						

== Discography ==
=== Studio albums ===
- No Secrets (2002)
- Friends Forever (Unreleased; intended for 2004)

=== Singles ===
- "That's What Girls Do" (2002)
- "Kids in America" (2002)
- "Kiss the Girl" on Disneymania (2002)
- "Whole Again" (2003)
- "Once Upon (Another) Dream" (2003)

=== Video ===
- Get to Know Us (released in the United States VHS/DVD format on March 19, 2002)
