= Aaron's Party (Come Get It) (song) =

2000 single by Aaron Carter

Single by Aaron Carter

from the album Aaron's Party (Come Get It)
- B-side: "(Have Some) Fun with the Funk"
- Released: August 1, 2000
- Genre: Pop rap
- Length: 3:25
- Label: Jive
- Songwriter: Kierulf/Schwartz 'B'Side: S. Lunt

Aaron Carter singles chronology
"Children of the World" (1999)	"Aaron's Party (Come Get It)" (2000)	"I Want Candy" (2000)

"Aaron's Party (Come Get It)" is the first single from Aaron Carter's second studio album, Aaron's Party (Come Get It). It was his only Top 40 hit in the United States, peaking at number 35 on the Billboard Hot 100. Outside the United States, it reached number 51 in the United Kingdom and number 71 in the Netherlands.

== Critical reception ==
In his review for Billboard, Chuck Taylor characterized the song as "clearly youth-centric", highlighting its "super-youthful pop melodies with high-pitched rapping". He observed that it "is a little jarring at first to hear an all-American blond kid rapping and talking like a street-wise punk at times", but suggested that, particularly in the Radio Disney format, its "proximity comes across as hip and daring—and all in good, clean fun".

== Music video ==
A music video was produced to promote the single release of "Aaron's Party (Come Get It)", enacting the party scene of the song. The video shows Aaron Carter dancing in a house party with his friends while his parents are out on a date. Everything goes really well until Carter's parents come home and find out that he threw a party while they were gone and they ground him as a result. The video was shot in Canada along with his other singles "Iko Iko", "I Want Candy", and "Bounce".

== Track listings ==
US single

1. "Aaron's Party (Come Get It)" – 3:24
2. Snippets ("I Want Candy" and "Bounce") – 2:33
3. "Jump Jump" – 2:36
4. Aaron Talking – 0:51

UK single

1. "Aaron's Party (Come Get It)"
2. "Aaron's Party (Come Get It)" [Instrumental]
3. "(Have Some) Fun with the Funk"

== Charts ==
Weekly cgart performance for "Aaron's Party (Come Get It)"
Chart (2000–2001)	Peak position
Australia (ARIA)	73
Netherlands (Single Top 100)	74
Guatemala (Notimex)	8
Scotland Singles (OCC)	44
UK Singles (OCC)	51
UK Indie (OCC)	18
US Billboard Hot 100	35

== Certifications ==
Region	Certification	Certified units/sales
United States (RIAA)	Gold	500,000^{^}
^{^} Shipments figures based on certification alone.
