= Aaron Carter =

American singer (1987–2022)

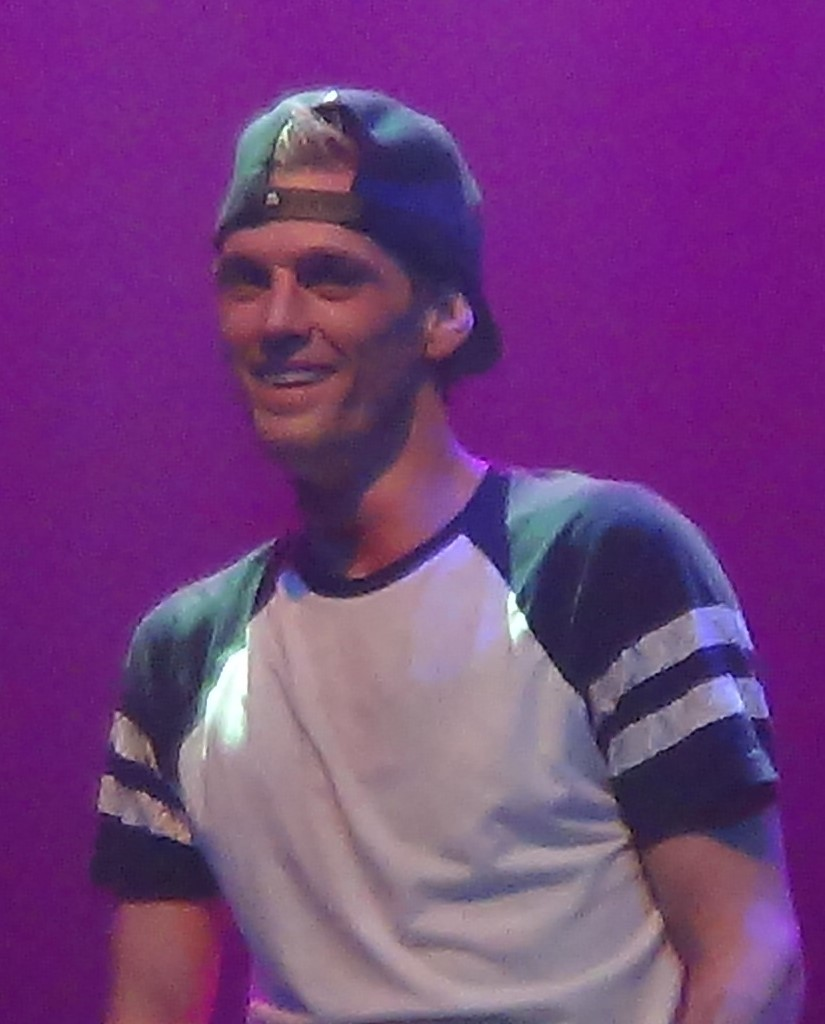
- Carter in 2014
- Born: December 7, 1987; Tampa, Florida, U.S.
- Died: November 5, 2022 (aged 34); Lancaster, California, U.S.
- Resting place: Forest Lawn Memorial Park, Los Angeles, California, U.S.
- Occupations: Singer; songwriter; rapper; actor
- Years active: 1995–2022
- Children: 1
- Musical career
- Genres: Pop; hip-hop
- Instruments: Vocals; guitar
- Labels: Rakkaus; Edel; Jive; Zomba; Sony BMG
- Website: aaroncarter.love

Aaron Charles Carter (December 7, 1987 – November 5, 2022) was an American singer and rapper. He rose to fame as a teen pop singer in the late 1990s and established himself as a star among preteen and teenage audiences during the early 2000s.

Carter began performing at age seven following the formation of his brother Nick's singing group, the Backstreet Boys. He released his self-titled debut album in 1997 at age nine, selling one million copies worldwide. His second album, Aaron's Party (Come Get It) (2000), sold three million copies in the United States. Carter soon began making guest appearances on both Disney Channel and Nickelodeon and touring with the Backstreet Boys. Carter's next album, Oh Aaron, went platinum.

Carter performed on Dancing with the Stars, in the Broadway musical Seussical, and in the off-Broadway musical The Fantasticks. He also appeared in several one-off performances. In 2014, he released the single "Ooh Wee", featuring rapper Pat SoLo. Carter released the single "Fool's Gold" in 2016 and the EP Love in 2017. His final album, Blacklisted, was released two days after his drug-related accidental death in 2022.

== Early life and family ==
Aaron Charles Carter was born on December 7, 1987, in Tampa, Florida. His parents, Jane Schneck and Robert Gene Carter (1952–2017), owned a bar and later ran a retirement home. Carter's older brother, Nick, is a member of the Backstreet Boys. He also had two older sisters, Bobbie Jean (1982–2023) and Leslie (1986–2012), and a twin sister, Angel. In addition to his full siblings, Carter had an older half-sister, Ginger Lee Carter (1972–2023), and a younger half-brother, Kaden Carter. Carter attended Frank D. Miles Elementary School and Ruskin Elementary School in Florida.

Carter's parents divorced in 2004. He was told about the divorce one hour before filming his MTV Cribs episode.

Carter and his siblings starred in a reality show, House of Carters, which ran from October to November 2006 on E!. The series featured all five Carter siblings reuniting to live in the same house. Carter had a tumultuous relationship with his siblings, with many of their feuds playing out on social media in his later years. In September 2019, Carter leveled allegations of sexual abuse against his sister Leslie, who died of a drug overdose in 2012. Carter reported that the abuse began when he was ten years old, ended when he was 13, and occurred when Leslie would fail to take prescribed medication for her bipolar disorder. He also accused his brother Nick of life-long abuse and implied that Nick also abused a female family member. Nick's legal team denied the allegations. Aaron Carter made the abuse allegations against Nick after Nick and their sister Angel had sought restraining orders against Aaron; Aaron had reportedly confessed to thoughts of killing Nick's then-pregnant wife, Lauren.

In 2019, Carter and his mother, Jane, appeared in the We TV reality series Marriage Bootcamp: Family Edition. The series focuses on attempting to repair strained relationships through unconventional therapy.

== Career ==
=== 1997–1999: Music beginnings and self-titled debut album ===
Carter began his career as the lead singer of Dead End as a seven-year-old. He left the band after two years because he wanted to perform pop music, while the other members were interested in alternative rock.

Carter made his first solo appearance at age nine, singing The Jets' "Crush on You" when opening for the Backstreet Boys in Berlin in March 1997. The performance was followed by a record contract, and in the fall of 1997, he released his first single "Crush on You". Carter's self-titled debut studio album was released on December 1, 1997. The album achieved gold status in Canada, Denmark, Germany, Norway, and Spain, and was released in the United States on June 16, 1998.

=== 2000–2001: Aaron's Party (Come Get It), acting debut, and Oh Aaron ===
Carter's second studio album, Aaron's Party (Come Get It), was released in the United States on September 26, 2000, under the Jive label. The album sold more than three million copies in the United States and was certified 3× platinum by RIAA. Tracks included the hit singles, "I Want Candy", "Aaron's Party (Come Get It)", "That's How I Beat Shaq", and "Bounce", all of which received airplay on Disney Channel and Nickelodeon. He also made several guest appearances on Nickelodeon and performed as the opening act in several concerts for the Backstreet Boys and Britney Spears' Oops!... I Did It Again Tour.

In March 2001, he made his acting debut, guest-starring on an episode of the Disney Channel series Lizzie McGuire. That same month, he and fellow teen star Samantha Mumba performed a concert at MGM Studios live on Disney Channel, titled Aaron Carter and Samantha Mumba in Concert. Carter's part of the concert was released on DVD the same month as Aaron's Party: Live in Concert. In April 2001, he made his Broadway debut, playing JoJo the Who in the musical Seussical.

At the age of 13, Carter recorded his third studio album Oh Aaron, released on August 7, 2001, which featured his first duet recording with his brother Nick, and a song with the group No Secrets. Play Along Toys created an Aaron Carter doll in conjunction with the album's release. Oh Aaron went platinum that same year and a live concert at Baton Rouge, Louisiana, was released to DVD as Oh Aaron: Live in Concert. His songs "Leave It Up to Me", "A.C.'s Alien Nation", and "Go Jimmy Jimmy" were used in the soundtrack for the 2001 film Jimmy Neutron: Boy Genius.

=== 2002–2008: Another Earthquake, Most Requested Hits, Saturday Night and House of Carters ===
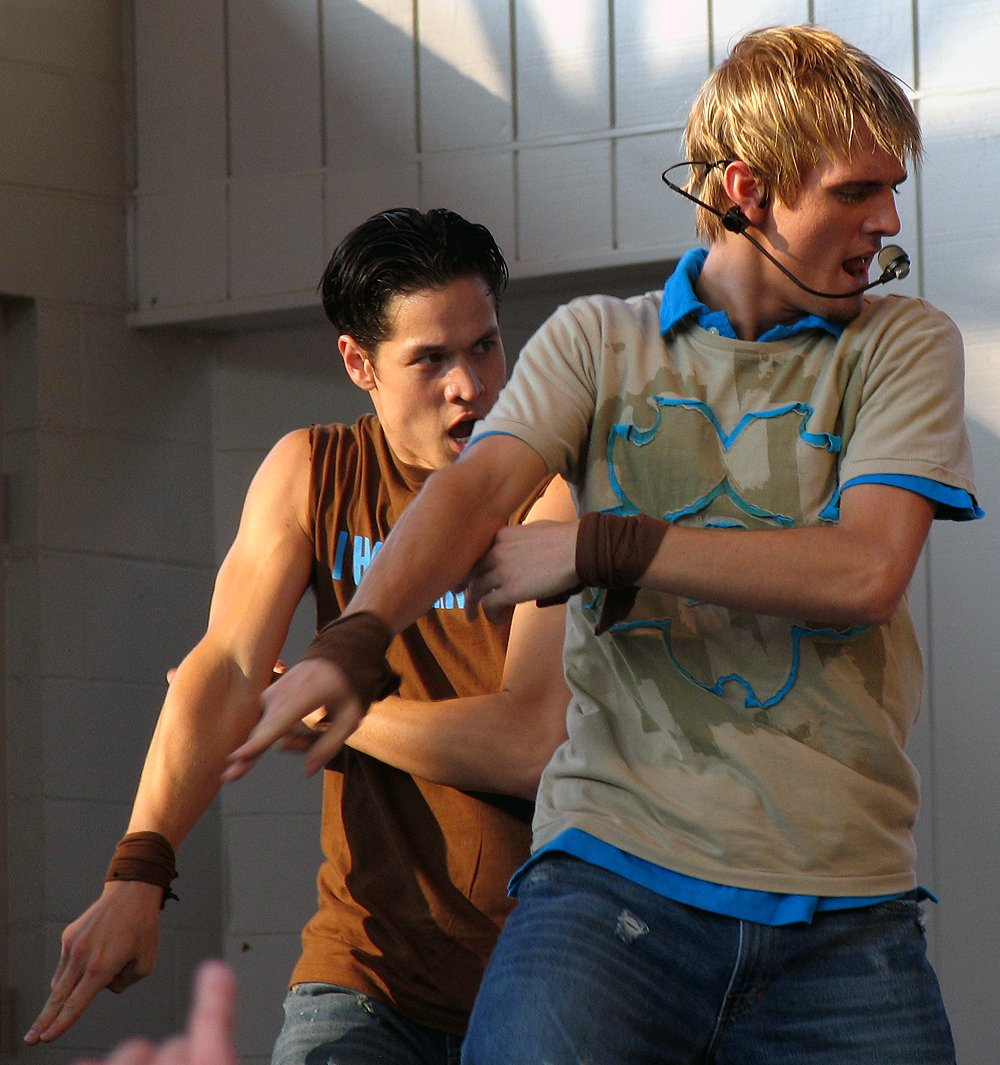
Carter performing in 2005

Carter's fourth studio album, Another Earthquake!, was released on September 3, 2002, during the Rock, Rap and Retro Tour. The album featured the patriotic-themed "America A.O." and the ballad "Do You Remember". He guest-starred on three episodes of the Nickelodeon television series All That and also sang "Through My Own Eyes", the theme song to the PBS animated series Liberty's Kids, alongside Kayla Hinkle.

Carter's Most Requested Hits, a collection including tracks from his last three albums as well as a new single, "One Better", was released on November 3, 2003.

"Saturday Night" was released on March 22, 2005, and promoted by Carter that summer. The song was released by Trans Continental label, with Lou Pearlman as executive producer. The single was also featured in the soundtrack of the film Popstar, in which Carter starred. The direct-to-video film was based heavily on his own life as a performer. A real-life motocross racer, Carter also appeared in the 2005 film Supercross.

Carter and his siblings starred in a reality show, House of Carters, which ran from October to November 2006 on E!. The series featured all five Carter siblings reuniting to live in the same house.

=== 2009–2013: Dancing with the Stars and return to touring ===
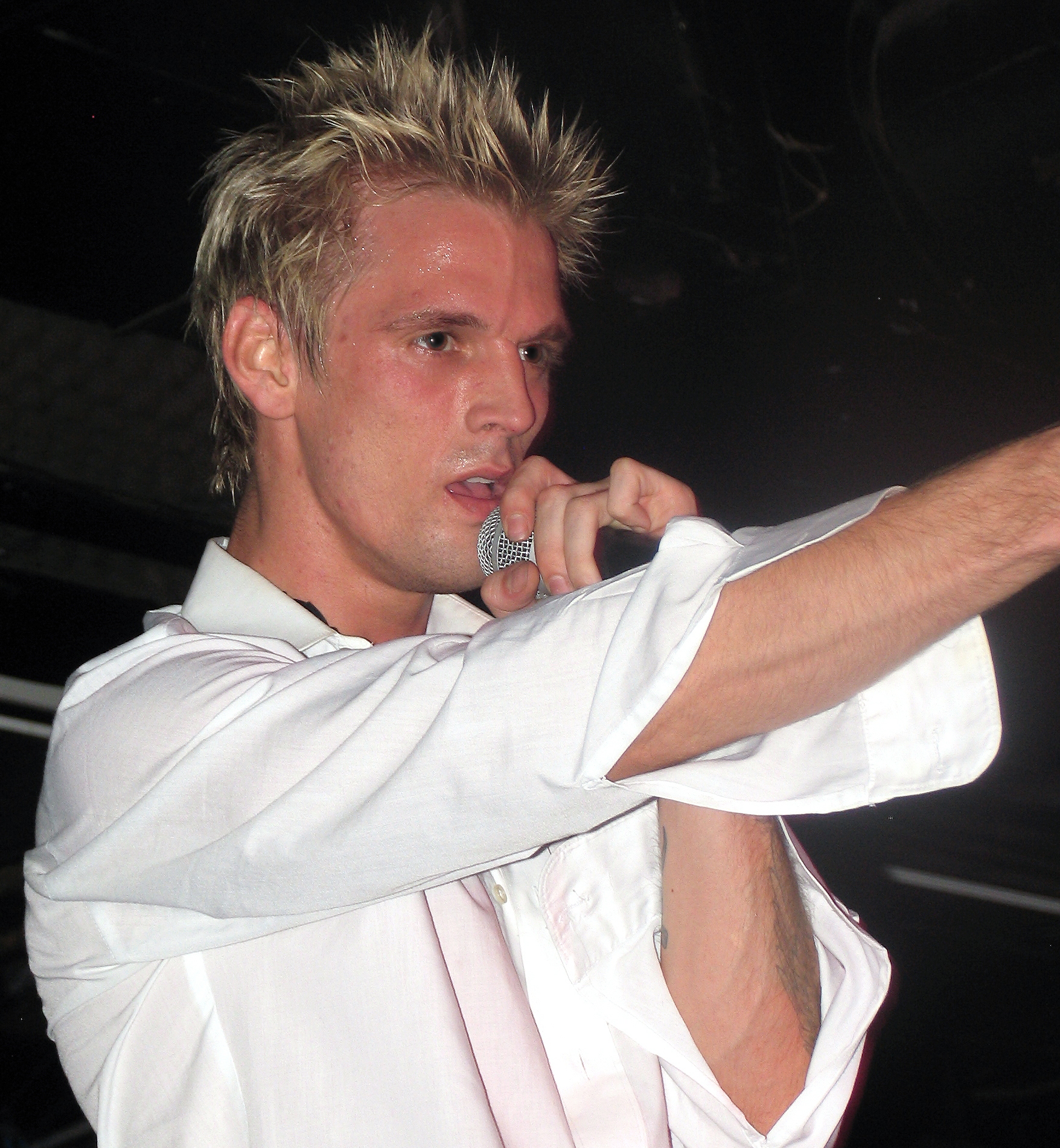
Carter performing on July 30, 2010

In 2009, Carter joined season 9 of Dancing with the Stars. He was partnered with Karina Smirnoff; they finished in fifth place. During this time he also released some music online, including the single "Dance with Me" featuring Flo Rida.

On November 7, 2011, Carter began starring in the off-Broadway production of the world's longest running musical, The Fantasticks, at the Snapple Theater Center in New York City. Carter was cast in the role of Matt, the play's central character.

In January 2012, Carter was one of eight celebrities participating in the Food Network reality series Rachael vs. Guy: Celebrity Cook-Off. He was eliminated in the first episode.

In 2013, Carter kicked off his first tour in eight years, the After Party Tour. The tour ran from February to December 2013, and included over 150 shows in the United States and Canada.

=== 2014–2024: The Music Never Stopped, LØVË, and posthumous releases ===
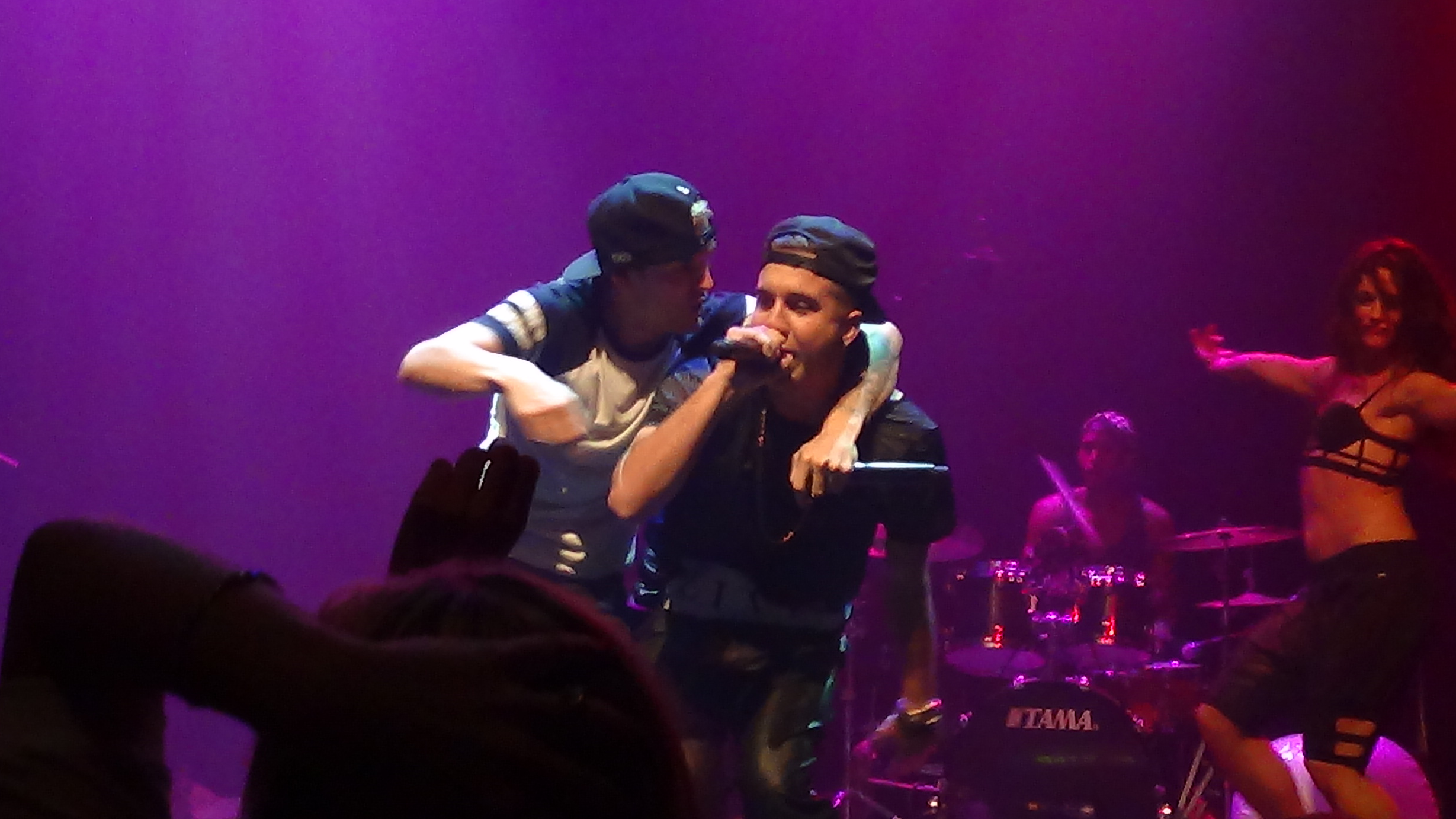
Carter performing "Ooh Wee" with rapper Pat SoLo in 2014 at the Gramercy Theatre in New York

In June 2014, Carter went on an 11-city Canadian tour during which he performed new songs from his upcoming album. Carter also announced that he would be embarking on a worldwide tour entitled the Wonderful World Tour, named for a song titled "Wonderful World" off of his upcoming album. The tour included 50 dates and ran from September 2014 until January 2015. In July, Carter appeared on Good Day L.A., where he performed "Ooh Wee", a single featuring Pat SoLo. In February 2015, Carter released an EP through SoundCloud titled The Music Never Stopped.

On January 31, 2016, Carter released his music video for "Curious" under the name Kid Carter, co-directed by MDM Media's Michael D. Monroe, Ben Epstein, and himself.

In April 2016, Carter released the single "Fool's Gold". Another single, "Sooner or Later", was released in January 2017. Both songs appeared on the EP LØVË, released in February 2017, written by Carter, Jon Asher, Melanie Fontana, Taylor "Lakestreet Louie" Helgeson, and Michel Schulz, produced and independently released by Carter on his new venture Rakkaus Records. An album of the same name was released as his fifth studio album on February 16, 2018.

In March 2020, Carter set up an OnlyFans account. Carter began charging $50 to $100 per nude photo, or $26 a month. PinkNews reported that "the prices are steep and the content is bizarre", while Queerty added: "The reviews of Aaron Carter's OnlyFans page are in and they're not good".

In August 2021, Carter was announced as a performer in the Las Vegas production of Naked Boys Singing!. He was let go before the show's debut because he declined to be vaccinated against COVID-19.

Two days after his death on November 5, 2022, Blacklisted was released on all music platforms by its producers as a tribute to Carter. The album was originally to be released on December 7, which would have been Carter's 35th birthday. Its posthumous release was however criticized by Carter's management, who had not authorized the release. It was deleted during late November and is now unavailable. Some songs however were later re-released on an EP entitled The Prince of Pop by Carter's collaborator 3D Friends.

On April 5, 2024, a new posthumous release was announced. Entitled "Recovery", it was released on May 24.

== Personal life ==
=== Sexuality, relationships, and child ===
As a teenager, Carter dated several high-profile celebrities, including Hilary Duff and Lindsay Lohan. On September 17, 2006, at age 18, Carter became engaged to former beauty queen and Playboy model Kari Ann Peniche; he proposed to her on stage while performing at the Palms Casino Resort in Las Vegas. Carter broke off the engagement after six days, saying his decision to propose was impulsive. He began dating Madison Parker in 2016; they broke up in August 2017.

Carter came out as bisexual in August 2017 through Twitter, and in December he made a guest appearance on the podcast LGBTQ&A to discuss both his career and sexuality. He reaffirmed his bisexuality publicly on at least one other occasion, but he said all his past relationships were with women.

Carter had a son who was born November 22, 2021, to his then-fiancée, Melanie Martin.

=== Health ===
On January 23, 2011, Carter's manager, Johnny Wright, announced that Carter had entered a treatment facility to seek emotional and spiritual healing. After entering the facility, Carter's first message to his fans was, "The main thing in life is not to be afraid of being human." On February 10, 2011, it was announced that Carter had successfully completed a month of rehabilitation at the Betty Ford Center in Rancho Mirage, California.

In September 2017, Carter appeared on The Doctors, a syndicated health-focused talk show, to discuss public attention generated by his gaunt appearance and drug-related arrests. A series of tests revealed that Carter did not have cancer or any sexually transmitted disease, but did have a candida infection, which can be a sign of a weakened immune system. Carter tested negative for illegal drugs, but he tested positive for "a mixture of benzodiazepines with opioids", a potentially dangerous combination of prescription medications that Carter said he took for anxiety and sleep. Carter was malnourished and underweight at 115 pounds (52 kg). He was advised to enter a drug rehabilitation program and remain under medical care. Carter later admitted himself to Alo House, a treatment center in Malibu, California. In February 2018, he reported improvement and stated that his weight was 160 pounds (73 kg).

In a further appearance on The Doctors in 2019, Carter disclosed that he had been diagnosed with schizophrenia, bipolar disorder, dissociative identity disorder and acute anxiety.

=== Disputes, financial issues, and legal issues ===
In 2002, Carter's parents filed a lawsuit against his former manager Lou Pearlman, alleging failure to pay hundreds of thousands of dollars in royalties on Carter's 1998 album, which was released through Pearlman's label and production company Trans Continental. On March 13, 2003, Pearlman was declared in contempt of court for ignoring a court order to produce documents relating to royalty payments; however, the suit itself was settled out of court.

Carter's parents managed his career for many years. In December 2003, Carter filed for legal emancipation from his mother, Jane. He also released a statement accusing his mother of having stolen $100,000 from his bank account. The following month, the dispute between Jane Carter and Aaron Carter was resolved, and the family's attorney stated that Aaron was no longer seeking emancipation.

In accordance with the California Child Actor's Bill, Carter's parents were supposed to put 15% of his earnings into a Coogan account. Carter claimed that he only received $2 million when he turned 18 and that he ought to have received $20 million. Upon turning 18, Carter also learned that he owed $4 million in back taxes. Carter claimed that his earnings had helped his parents purchase 30 cars and 15 houses and that he did not receive any portion of the profits when his parents sold the properties that had been purchased with his earnings. Carter also claimed that his father fired a .44 Magnum near his ear to coerce him into signing a $256,000 check.

On March 21, 2006, Trans Continental filed a lawsuit against Carter with the Los Angeles County Superior Court, citing that Carter reneged on a recording deal. Carter signed the contract on December 7, 2004, when he was 17; his attorney argued that Carter had the right to "cancel or void various agreements" that were signed when he was a minor.

In February 2008, Carter was arrested in Kimble County, Texas, when he was pulled over for speeding, and authorities found just under two ounces of marijuana in his car.

On November 22, 2013, Carter filed a bankruptcy petition to shed more than $3.5 million in debt, mostly taxes owed from the money made at the height of his popularity when he was a minor. The petition states that Carter owed the Internal Revenue Service $1.3 million in back taxes from his income in 2003. Carter settled all of his tax debt in 2014.

In July 2017, Carter was arrested in Georgia on suspicion of driving under the influence and marijuana charges. He agreed to plead no contest to reckless driving and was placed on probation and, among other conditions, was ordered to perform community service and pay $1,500 in court fees and fines.

In August 2019, Carter was granted a restraining order against his ex-girlfriend, Russian model Lina Valentina, after she reportedly threatened to stab him.

In September 2019, a court granted Nick Carter a temporary restraining order against Aaron Carter after Nick alleged that Aaron threatened to kill his then-pregnant wife. In November 2019, one-year restraining orders against Aaron Carter were granted to Nick Carter, Angel Carter, and Corey Conrad (Angel's husband).

In January 2020, German artist Jonas Jödicke tweeted that Carter was making unauthorized use of Jödicke's copyrighted artwork to promote merchandise. Carter replied on Twitter that Jödicke "should've taken it as a compliment". Following the incident, Jödicke was interviewed by Forbes, saying he was "absolutely amazed" at Carter's response. In June 2021, Carter agreed to pay Jödicke $12,500.

Carter's girlfriend, Melanie Martin, was arrested in Los Angeles in March 2020 after allegedly committing an act of domestic violence against Carter.

== Death ==
On November 5, 2022, Carter died at his home in Lancaster, California at the age of 34. His body was found in his bathtub by a housekeeper.

The cause of Carter's death was not immediately publicized. The Los Angeles County Medical Examiner-Coroner later stated that Carter had inhaled difluoroethane and taken alprazolam (Xanax), and that his death was an accidental drowning.

Carter was cremated. His ashes were interred at Forest Lawn Memorial Park–Hollywood Hills.

== Discography ==
=== Studio albums ===
- Aaron Carter (1997)
- Aaron's Party (Come Get It) (2000)
- Oh Aaron (2001)
- Another Earthquake! (2002)
- Love (2018)
- Blacklisted (2022)
- Recovery (2024)

== Tours ==
Headlining

- Party Tour (2000–2001)
- Aaron's Winter Party (2002)
- Rock, Rap and Retro Tour (2002)
- Jukebox Tour (2003–2004)
- Remix Tour (2005)
- After Party Tour (2013)
- Aaron Carter's Wonderful World Tour (2014)

Co-headlining

- Kids Go Music Festival (1998) (with Take 5, No Authority, and 911)
- Kids Go Christmas Festival (1998) (with R&B)
- All That! Music and More Festival (1999) (with Monica, 98 Degrees, B*Witched, Tatyana Ali, 3rd Storee, and No Authority)
- Radio Disney Live! 2001 World Tour (2001) (with Krystal Harris, Hoku, Baha Men, Myra, True Vibe, Jump5, Brooke Allison, Plus One, Kaci, Play, and A-Teens)
- Pop 2000 Tour (2018–2020)

Opening act

- Backstreet Boys: Live In Concert Tour (1997) (Germany, Switzerland, Austria)
- Backstreet's Back Tour (1998) (United States, Canada)
- Oops!... I Did It Again Tour (2000) (England, Germany)

Promotional

- Eurasian Tour (1998)
- Australian Tour (2000)
- Wal-Mart Promo Tour (2000)

== Filmography ==
=== Film ===
Year	Title	Role	Notes
2004	Fat Albert	Darren/The Kid	
2004	Ella Enchanted		Main male vocals on "Somebody to Love"
2005	Popstar	JD McQueen	Straight to DVD
2005	Supercross	Owen Cole	
2006	I Want Someone to Eat Cheese With	Marty	
2014	College Fright Night	Brian	Final film role

=== Television ===
Year	Title	Role	Notes
1998	Figure It Out	Himself	1 episode
1999	Zoom	Himself	1 episode
2001	Lizzie McGuire	Himself	1 episode: "Here Comes Aaron Carter"
2001	Rocket Power	Clutch Kroemer	Voice; 1 episode: "Legends and Their Falls"
2001	Sabrina the Teenage Witch	Himself	1 episode: "Beach Blanket Bizarro"
2002	48 Hours Mystery	Himself	1 episode
2002	Liberty's Kids	Joseph Plumb Martin	Voice; 2 episodes
2003	Family Affair	Liam Martin	1 episode: "Sissy's Big Fat Moroccan First Date"
2004	7th Heaven	Harry	2 episodes
2005	Penn & Teller: Off the Deep End	Himself	
2006	House of Carters	Himself	8 episodes; also producer
2007	Grand Stand	Mitch	Unaired pilot
2009	Dancing with the Stars	Himself	Fifth place
2014	I Heart Nick Carter	Himself	1 episode
2016	Life or Debt	Himself	
2016	Angie Tribeca	P.T. Cruiser	1 episode: "Boyz II Dead"
2017	The Doctors	Himself	
2019	Marriage Bootcamp: Reality Stars Family Edition	Himself	10 episodes; final television role
