= Love (surname) =

Love is an English language surname of several possible origins.

It is possibly derived from "Luiff", which came from "Wolf".

See also Löve, another surname.

Notable people with the surname include:

== In sports ==
- Bob Love (1942–2024), American basketball player
- Bryce Love (born 1997), American football player
- Caleb Love (born 2001), American basketball player
- Colin Love (born 1945), Australian rugby league football administrator
- Davis Love III (born 1964), American golfer
- Donald Love (born 1994), Scottish footballer; defender for Sunderland
- Glenn Love (born 1989), American football player
- Harry Love (cricketer) (1871–1942), English cricketer
- Ian Love (born 1958), Welsh footballer
- Jeremiyah Love (born 2005), American football player
- Jesse Love (born 2005), American racing driver
- Joanne Love (born 1985), Scottish footballer
- John Love (1924–2005), Rhodesian race car driver
- John Love (born 1944), (John Louis Love) American football player
- Jordan Love (born 1998), American football player
- Josh Love (born 1996), American football player
- Julian Love (born 1998), American football player
- Kevin Love (born 1988), American basketball player
- Kyle Love (born 1986), American football player
- Langston Love (born 2002), American basketball player
- Mike Love (defensive lineman) (born 1994), American football player
- Pauline Love (born 1987), American basketball player and coach
- Ricky Love, American basketball player
- Stan Love (basketball) (1949–2025), American basketball player; father of Kevin Love and brother of Beach Boys member Mike Love
- Ted Love (born 1991), Brazilian footballer
- Vágner Love (born 1984), Brazilian footballer
- Yeardley Love (1987–2010), American women's lacrosse player and murder victim

== In music ==
- Airrion Love (born 1968), American singer (member of The Stylistics)
- Abz Love Richard Abidin Breen (born 29 June 1979), better known as Abz Love, is an English singer, rapper and songwriter. Love was a member of the boy band Five and is current member of supergroup Boyz on Block.
- Christine Love (singer), Filipino singer
- Courtney Love (born 1964), American musician and actress
- Darlene Love (born 1941), American singer
- D. Wayne Love, British vocalist with the Alabama 3 (A3 in the US)
- G. Love (born 1972), stage name of Garrett Dutton III, American musician
- Geoff Love (1917–1991), British musician
- Gerard Love, bass player and songwriter and founding member of Teenage Fanclub
- Kylie Sonique Love (born 1983), American drag queen, singer, dancer and reality television personality
- Larry Love, British vocalist with the Alabama 3 (A3 in the US)
- Mary Love (1943–2013), American soul and gospel singer
- Matthew Love, Australian musician, member of indie band Even as We Speak
- Mike Love (born 1941), American singer-songwriter and founding member of The Beach Boys
- Monie Love (born 1970), stage name of Simone Wilson or Simone Gooden, British singer, emcee and radio personality
- Patrick Love (born 1968), American gospel musician
- Rico Love (born 1982), American rapper and record producer
- Shirley Love (mezzo-soprano) (born 1940), American opera singer
- Willie Love (1906–1953), American Delta blues pianist

== In entertainment ==
- Adrian Love (1944–1999), British radio presenter
- Angelina Love, the best-known ring name of Lauren Ann Williams (born 1981), Canadian wrestler
- Bessie Love (1898–1986), American actress
- Brandi Love, stage name for Tracey Lynn Livermore (born 1973), an American pornographic actress
- Christine Love (writer) (born 1989), Canadian video game developer and writer
- Darris Love, (born 1980), American actor
- Dude Love, a ring name of Mick Foley (born 1965), American wrestler
- Gary Love (born 1964), British actor and film director
- Harry Love (animator) (1911–1997), American animator
- Kermit Love (1916–2008), American puppeteer, costume designer and actor
- Loni Love (born 1971), American comedian, television host, actress, and author
- Lucretia Love (1941-2019), American actress
- Nick Love (born 1969), English film director and writer
- Pauline Joless Love (1914–2001), American actress better known as Pauline Moore

== In science and technology ==
- Augustus Edward Hough Love (1863–1940), British mathematician
- David Love (geologist) (1913–2002), American field geologist
- David J. Love (born 1979), American professor of engineering
- Ida Dorothy Love (1908–1990), Australian nurse and midwifery educator
- Robert Love (born 1981), American open-source software developer, author and speaker
- Stanley G. Love (born 1965), American scientist and NASA astronaut
- Paul E. Love (born 1957), American scientist
- Wilton Love (1861–1933), Australian medical doctor, surgeon and x-ray pioneer

== In the military ==
- General Sir Frederick Love (1789–1866), British Army officer and Lieutenant Governor of Jersey
- George M. Love (1831–1887), American Civil War Medal of Honor recipient
- Harry Love (lawman) (1810–1868), head of California's first law enforcement agency
- John Love (general) (1820–1881), United States Army Major General (Indiana) during and after the Mexican–American War
- John K. Love, United States Marine Corps general serving with NATO
- Nancy Harkness Love (1914–1976), American pilot, commander of Women's Auxiliary Ferrying Squadron in World War II
- Robert Love (soldier) (1760–1845), American Revolutionary War soldier and political leader
- Robert J. Love, American pilot, Korean War flying ace

== In politics and law ==
- Janet Love (born 1957), South African former politician and vice-chairperson of the Electoral Commission of South Africa
- John Arthur Love (1916–2002), American politician, governor of the State of Colorado
- Mia Love (1975–2025), American politician
- Milton Sydney Love (1852–1924), magistrate in New South Wales, Australia
- Peter Early Love (1818–1866), American politician, lawyer, jurist
- Ralph Love (1907–1994), New Zealand politician and activist
- Reggie Love (born 1981), personal aide to U.S. President Barack Obama
- Samuel B. Love, American politician from Florida
- Sandra Love (1945–2018), American politician
- Shirley Love (politician), (1933–2020), American politician and radio broadcaster
- Taft Love, American politician from Wyoming
- William Love (disambiguation), several people, including

- William Love (Australian politician) (1810–1885), New South Wales MLA
- William Love (London MP) (c. 1620–1689), for City of London
- William Carter Love (1784–1835), U.S. Representative from North Carolina
- William F. Love (1850–1898), U.S. Representative from Mississippi
- William L. Love (fl. 1872–1951), New York politician
- William D. Love (1859–1933) United States Tax Court judge

== In religion and philosophy ==
- Rev. John Love (minister), D.D. (1757–1825), Church of Scotland preacher and author
- Richard Love (1596–1661), English churchman and academic

== Others ==
- Bernice Love, unmarried name of Bernice Love Wiggins (1897–1936), Texas poet
- Buddy Love, the main villain in the film The Nutty Professor and its remake
- George H. Love (1900–1991), American businessperson
- Hamilton Love (1875–1922), lumberman and sportswriter
- Horace Beevor Love (1800–1838), British portrait painter
- Iris Love (1933–2020), American archaeologist
- Layla Love (born 1980), American photographer
- Peter Love (executed 1610), English pirate
- Samuel G. Love (1821–1893), American educationist
- Tom Love (1937–2023), American entrepreneur

== See also ==
- Löve (disambiguation)
- Løve (disambiguation)
