= Love (disambiguation) =

Love is an emotion of strong affection and personal attachment to people and things.

Love may also refer to:

== Places ==
=== United States ===
- Love, Mississippi, an unincorporated community
- Love, Cass County, Texas, an unincorporated community
- Love, Swisher County, Texas, an unincorporated community
- Love, Virginia, an unincorporated community
- Dallas Love Field, an airport
- Love County, Oklahoma
- LOVE Park (JFK Plaza), Philadelphia
- Love Township, Vermilion County, Illinois

=== Other places ===
- Love, Saskatchewan, Canada, a village
- Lõve, Estonia, a village
- Love River, Taiwan
- Love Park (Toronto), Canada
- Love Park, Lima, Peru
- Love (crater), on the far side of the Moon

== People ==
- Love (given name), a Swedish first name
- Love (surname)
- Love (footballer), Angolan footballer Arsénio Sebastião Cabúngula (born 1979)
- Brother Love, a professional wrestling ring name of Bruce Prichard (born 1963)
- Sean Combs, known by the pseudonym "Love"

== Arts, entertainment and media ==
=== Fictional characters ===
- Love (Bleach), an animated TV series and comics character from Bleach
- Love (Ai Otsuka), a fictional character and singer created by Ai Otsuka
- Foxxy Love, an animated TV series character from Drawn Together
- Love Heart, from Sky Love and The King of Fighters
- Love Momozono, from Fresh Pretty Cure!
- Love, from Thor: Love and Thunder

=== Films ===
- Love (1919 American film), starring Fatty Arbuckle
- Love (1919 German film)
- Love (1927 American film), an adaptation of Anna Karenina starring Greta Garbo
- Love (1927 German film), a silent film directed by Paul Czinner
- Love (1952 film), a Swedish film directed by Gustaf Molander
- Love (1956 film), a German-Italian film starring Maria Schell and Raf Vallone
- Love (1971 film), directed by Károly Makk
- Love, a 1982 anthology of six vignettes written, directed and produced by women, including three by Mai Zetterling
- Love (1991 Indian film), starring Salman Khan and Revathi
- Love (1991 Soviet film), directed by Valery Todorovsky
- A Love (1999 film), starring Fabrizio Gifuni
- Love (2004 film), a Kannada feature film directed by Rajendra Singh Babu
- Love (2005 film), directed by Vladan Nikolic
- A Love (2007 film), starring Joo Jin-mo
- Love (2008 Indonesian film), directed by Kabir Bhatia
- Love (2008 Bengali film), by Indian director Riingo Bannerjee
- Love, a 2008 short film starring Kristina Klebe
- L-O-V-E, a 2009 Taiwanese anthology of four vignettes, featuring Wilson Chen
- Love (2011 film), directed by William Eubank
- Love or Amour, a French-language film directed by Michael Haneke
- Love (2012 film), directed by Doze Niu
- Love (2015 film), a French film directed by Gaspar Noé
- Love (2020 film), a Malayalam film directed by Khalid Rahman
- Love (2021 film), a Russian film directed by Igor Tverdokhlebov
- Love (2023 film), a Tamil-language film directed by R. P. Bala
- Love (2024 film), a Norwegian film directed by Dag Johan Haugerud

=== Video games ===
- Love (2008 video game), a platform video game, and its two sequels, Love 2: kuso, and Love 3
- Love (2010 video game), a massively multiplayer online role-playing game

=== Literature ===
- Love (1839 play), by James Sheridan Knowles
- Love (2016 play), by Alexander Zeldin
- Love (Carter novel), 1971, by Angela Carter
- Love (manga), a 1993 Japanese manga series by Osamu Ishiwata
- Love (Morrison novel), 2003, by Toni Morrison
- Love (Doyle novel), 2020, by Roddy Doyle

=== Music ===
==== Groups and labels ====
- Love (band), a 1960s-70s American rock group
- Love (Japanese band), a pop/R&B duo
- Love Records, a Finnish label
- =LOVE, a Japanese idol group

==== Albums ====
- Love (Aaron Carter EP), 2017
- Love (Aaron Carter album), 2018
- Love (Angels & Airwaves album), 2010
- Love (Arashi album), 2013
- Love (Ayumi Hamasaki EP), 2012
- Love (Aztec Camera album), 1987
- Love (Beatles album), 2006
- Love (The Cult album), or the title song, 1985
- Love (DramaGods album), 2005
- Love (Edyta Bartosiewicz album), or the title song, 1992
- Love (Flipper album), 2009
- Love (The Flower Kings album), 2025
- Love (Foetus album), 2005
- Love (Inhabited album), or the title song, 2008
- Love (Jay B EP), 2022
- Love (The Juliana Theory album), 2003
- Love (K-Ci & JoJo album), 2008
- Love, by Kelly Chen, 2003
- Love (Love album), 1966
- Love (Michael Bublé album), 2018
- Love (Mika Nakashima album), 2003
- Love (Rosemary Clooney album), 1963
- Love (S.E.S. album), or the title song (see below), 1999
- Love (Sesame Street album), or the title song, 1980
- Love (Thalía album), or the title song, 1992
- Love, by Tristan Prettyman, 2003
- L.O.V.E., by Eason Chan, 2018
- L.O.V.E (Terri Walker album), or the title song, 2005
- L.O.V.E (Zonke album), 2018
- L-O-V-E (album), by Nat King Cole, or the title song (see below), 1965
- Love... The Album, by Cliff Richard, 2007
- Love?, by Jennifer Lopez, or the title song (see below), 2011
- L.O.V.E. (Life of Valezka & Eko), by Valezka and Eko Fresh, 2004
- The Love Album (Westlife album), 2006

==== Songs ====
- "L-O-V-E (Love)", by Al Green
- "L-O-V-E", by Nat King Cole
- "L.O.V.E." (Ashlee Simpson song)
- "L.O.V.E" (Brown Eyed Girls song)
- "L.O.V.E.", by Jessie J from Who You Are
- "L.O.V.E.", by Sophie from the compilation album Product
- "L.O.V.E.", by VV Brown from Travelling Like the Light
- "L.O.V.E.", by Westlife from album Spectrum
- "L.O.V.E. Love", by Orange Juice on You Can't Hide Your Love Forever
- "Love" (CNBLUE song)
- "Love" (Disney song), from the film Robin Hood
- "Love" (Inna song)
- "Love" (Jana Kramer song)
- "Love" (John Lennon song)
- "Love" (Kendrick Lamar song)
- "Love" (Keyshia Cole song)
- "Love" (Kid Cudi song)
- "Love" (Lana Del Rey song)
- "Love" (Musiq Soulchild song)
- "Love" (Sasha Son song)
- "Love?" (Donna and Joe song)
- "Love (Can Make You Happy)", by Mercy
- "Love", composed by Ralph Blane and Hugh Martin, first performed by Lena Horne for the film Ziegfeld Follies, 1946
- "Love", by American Authors on Oh, What a Life
- "Love", by Benzino on Redemption
- "L.O.V.E.", by Black Eyed Peas on Elevation
- "Love", by The Chariot on One Wing
- "Love", by Charlotte Church on the EP Four
- "Love", by Country Joe and the Fish on Electric Music for the Mind and Body
- "Love", by the Cult, the title track of the album Love
- "Love", by Daughter
- "Love", by Def Leppard on Songs from the Sparkle Lounge
- "Love", by Destiny's Child from Destiny Fulfilled
- "Love", by (G)I-dle on the EP I Love
- "Love", by Gojira on Terra Incognita
- "Love", by Imagine Dragons on Origins
- "Love", by Joni Mitchell on Wild Things Run Fast
- "Love", by Kylie Minogue on Golden
- "Love", by Lostprophets on the single "A Town Called Hypocrisy"
- "Love", by Mary J. Blige on No More Drama
- "Love", by Matthew Sweet on Earth
- "Love", by Monsta X on the EP Shape of Love
- "Love", by Paul Simon on You're the One
- "Love", by Petra on Beyond Belief
- "Love", by Robyn Hitchcock and The Egyptians on Black Snake Diamond Röle
- "Love", by Sara Groves on Fireflies and Songs
- "Love", by S.E.S. on Be Ever Wonderful
- "Love", by Simian Mobile Disco on Attack Decay Sustain Release
- "Love", by the Smashing Pumpkins on Mellon Collie and the Infinite Sadness
- "Love", by Sonata Arctica on Pariah's Child
- "Love", by Sonic Dream Collective
- "Love", by Taemin on Move
- "Love", by Victoria Williams from Loose
- "Love", by Zoé on Rocanlover
- "Love?", by Bart Simpson from The Yellow Album
- "Love?", by Strapping Young Lad from Alien

=== Radio ===
- Love 97.2FM, a Singaporean radio station
- LOVE FM 104; see List of radio stations in Barbados
- Love Radio, a Philippine radio network owned by MBC Media Group
  - 90.7 Love Radio, its flagship station
- Love Radio, a Russian radio network owned by Krutoy Media

=== Television ===
- Love (2016 TV series), a 2016–2018 Netflix original series
- Love (2026 TV series), a 2026 Netflix original series
- The Spirits of Love, or simply Love, a 2006–2008 Taiwanese Formosa TV drama
- "Love" (2 Stupid Dogs), an episode of 2 Stupid Dogs
- "Love" (Death Note episode)
- "Love" (Don't Hug Me I'm Scared), an episode of Don't Hug Me I'm Scared
- "Love" (Our Girl), a 2014 episode
- "Love" (Spy in the Wild), nature documentary episode
- "The Love" (The Amazing World of Gumball), an episode of The Amazing World of Gumball

=== Other uses in arts, entertainment and media ===
- Love (Alexander Milov sculpture), a sculpture featured at Burning Man
- Love (Cirque du Soleil), a theatrical production
- LOVE (magazine), a bi-annual British style magazine
- Love (image), a pop art image by Robert Indiana
  - List of Love sculptures, for artworks based on Indiana's image
- L.O.V.E. (sculpture), a 2010 sculpture by Maurizio Cattelan in Milan, Italy

== Other uses ==
- Love (horse), thoroughbred racehorse
- Love, one of several names for the number 0 in English
  - Zero in the tennis scoring system
- Linguistics of visual English, a version of manually coded English in use North America
- Love Party (Italy), a political party in Italy founded in 1991
- Laventille Outreach for Vertical Enrichment (LOVE), a political party in Trinidad

== See also ==
- Løve, a surname
- Löve, a surname
- Loves (film), a 2004 Indian film
- Love's, American chain of truck stop and convenience stores
- LøVë (disambiguation)
- Love Love (disambiguation)
- Love Love Love (disambiguation)
- Loved (disambiguation)
- Luv (disambiguation)
- "Looove", a song on Utopia by Travis Scott
- "L.O.V.", a song from Pickin' Up the Pieces by Fitz and the Tantrums
- Love-in, a peaceful public gathering focused on meditation, love, music, sex and/or use of recreational drugs
- Love wave, a surface wave that produces horizontal motion
- Löve (game framework)
