= John Love =

John or Johnny Love may refer to:

== Law and politics ==
- John Lord Love (1841–1899), California politician
- John A. Love (1916–2002), Colorado governor
- John Russell Love (1895–1981), Alberta politician
- John Love (congressman) (died 1822), American politician and lawyer from Virginia

== Sports ==
- John Love (footballer) (1924–2007), Scottish football player and manager
- Johnny Love (footballer) (1937–2010), former English footballer
- John Love (American football) (born 1944), American football wide receiver
- John Love (racing driver) (1924–2005), Rhodesian racing driver

== Others ==
- John Love (minister) (1757–1825), Church of Scotland minister
- John Love (scientist) (1942–2016), pioneer of fibre optics
- John Love (general) (1820–1881), United States Army officer
- John Washington Love (1850–1880), artist; see William Forsyth
- Alain Payet (1947–2007), French director under the pseudonym John Love
- David Love (geologist) (John David Love, 1913–2002), American geologist
- John K. Love, United States Marine Corps general
