= Loved =

Loved may refer to:

- Love, an emotion of strong affection and personal attachment

== Music ==
- Loved (Claire Kuo album) or the title song, 2016
- Loved (Cranes album) or the title song, 1994
- Loved, an album by Parcels, 2025
- Loved, an album by KEN mode, 2018
- "Loved" (song), by Kim Wilde, 2001

== Other uses ==
- Loved (film), a 1997 American film directed by Erin Dignam
- Loved (video game), a 2010 browser-based platform game
- Loveshhuda (lit. 'Loved'), a 2016 Indian Hindi-language film

== See also ==
- Beloved (disambiguation)
- Love (disambiguation)
