= Harry Love =

Harry Love may refer to:

- Harry Love (animator) (1911–1997), American animator
- Harry Love (cricketer) (1871–1942), English cricketer
- Harry Love (lawman) (1810–1868), head of the California Rangers, California's first law enforcement agency
