= Love Is Love =

Love Is Love may refer to:

- Love Is Love (film), a 1990 Hong Kong film
- Love Is Love (comics), a 2016 comic book published by DC Comics and IDW Publishing to benefit victims of the Orlando nightclub shooting
- Love Is Love (album), a 1994 album by Elkie Brooks
- Love Is Love/Return to Dust, a 2012 album by Code Orange
- "Love Is Love" (Barry Ryan song), 1969
- "Love Is Love", a song by Culture Club from the 1984 soundtrack to the film Electric Dreams
- "Love Is Love", a song by Alfie Arcuri
- "Love Is Love (In Any Language)", a song by Christopher Cross from the 1985 album Every Turn of the World
- Love Is Love (TV series), Russian soap opera TV series

== See also ==
- "Love Is Love Is Love", a song by American singer LeAnn Rimes from the 2017 album Remnants
- Love Is Love Is Love (film), a 2020 American drama directed by Eleanor Coppola
- Bhalobasa Bhalobasa (disambiguation), Indian films
- Love Love (disambiguation)
