= Love, Texas =

Love, Texas, is the name of two unincorporated communities:

- Love, Cass County, Texas
- Love, Swisher County, Texas
