= Løve =

Løve (Danish, 'Lion') is a surname derived from "Lion".

== See also ==
- The dictionary definition of løve at Wiktionary
- Löve (disambiguation)
- Love (disambiguation)
- Norske Løve (disambiguation)
- Den Røde Løve (Danish ship)
- Mia Hansen-Løve (born 1981), French film director and screenwriter
