= William Love =

William Love may refer to:

- William Love (Australian politician) (1810–1885), member of the New South Wales Legislative Assembly
- William Love (London MP) (c. 1620–1689), Member of Parliament (MP) for the City of London
- William Carter Love (1784–1835), U.S. Representative from North Carolina
- William Edward Love (1806–1867), English impressionist
- William F. Love (1850–1898), U.S. Representative from Mississippi
- William H. Love (born 1957), Episcopal bishop of Albany, New York
- William L. Love (born 1872), New York politician
- William D. Love (1859–1933) United States Tax Court judge

== See also ==
- Willie Love (1906–1953), pianist
- Love (surname)
