= Norske Løve =

Norske Løve (Danish and Norwegian, 'Norwegian Lion') may refer to:

== Ships ==
- Norske Løve, the name of several ships in the History of the Danish navy
- Norske Løve (1704), of the Danish East India Company

== Buildings ==
- Norske Løve Fortress, in Horten, Norway
- Norske Løve, Køge, a former mail and coaching inn in Denmark

== See also ==
- Coat of arms of Norway
