= Baltazar Nicolai Garben =

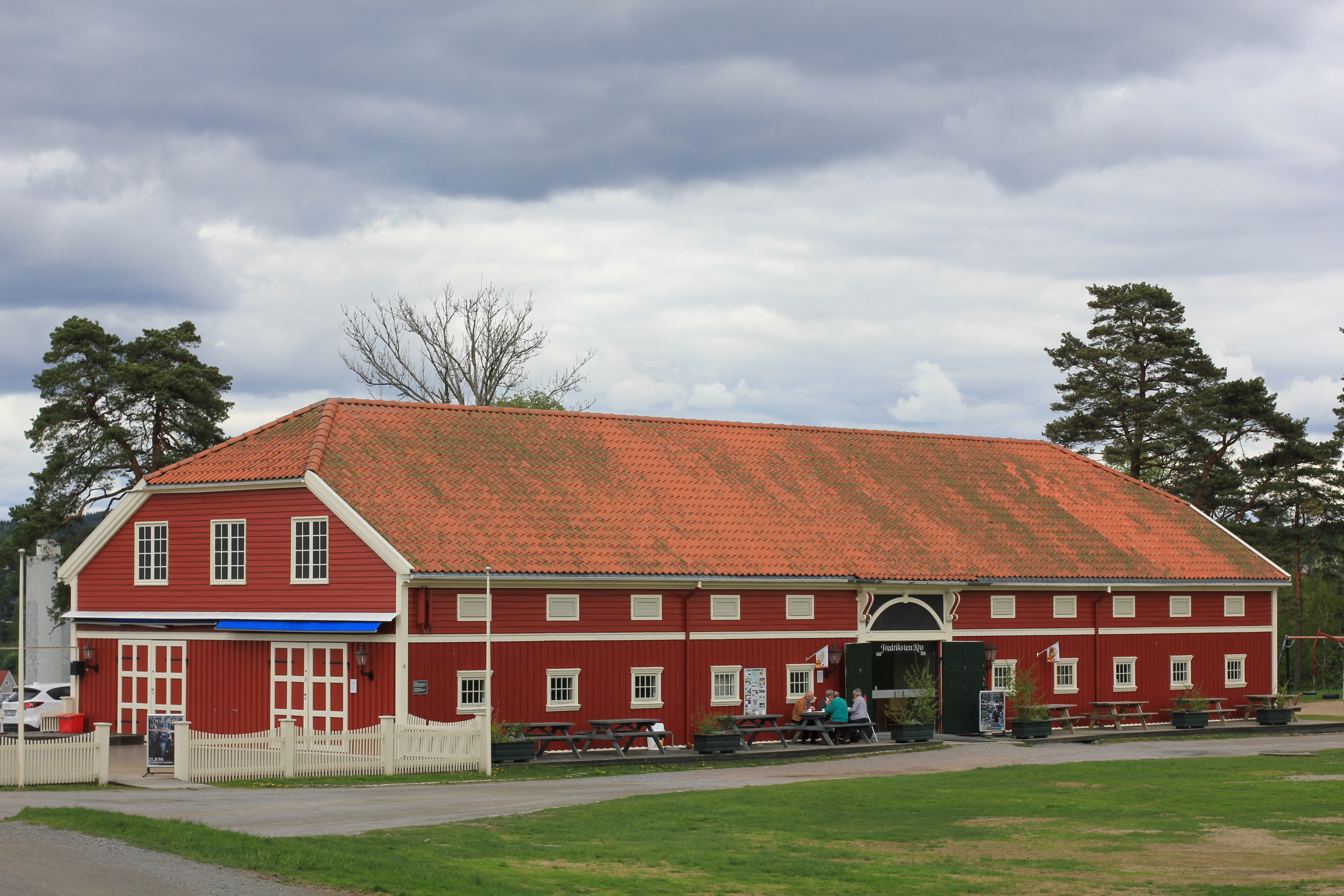
Tøyhuset, now Fredriksten Kro, at Halden

Baltazar Nicolai Garben (19 February 1794 – 21 April 1867) was a Norwegian military officer, engineer and government minister. He is most associated with the design and construction of various buildings including Tøyhuset (now Fredriksten Kro) at Halden, Norway.

== Biography ==
Garben was born at Sparbu in Nord-Trøndelag, Norway. He was a career military officer in the Norwegian Armed Forces and was trained in engineering. He was an officer from 1810, Colonel and Chief of the Norwegian Engineering Brigade from 1851 and General Major from 1851. Garben was responsible for the design of various military buildings at Fredriksten Fortress in Halden and at the Citadellet at Horten.

Garben served in the administration of Prime Minister Frederik Due as an interim member of the Norwegian Council of State Division in Stockholm during 1852, 1852–1853 and 1857 .

== Gallery ==
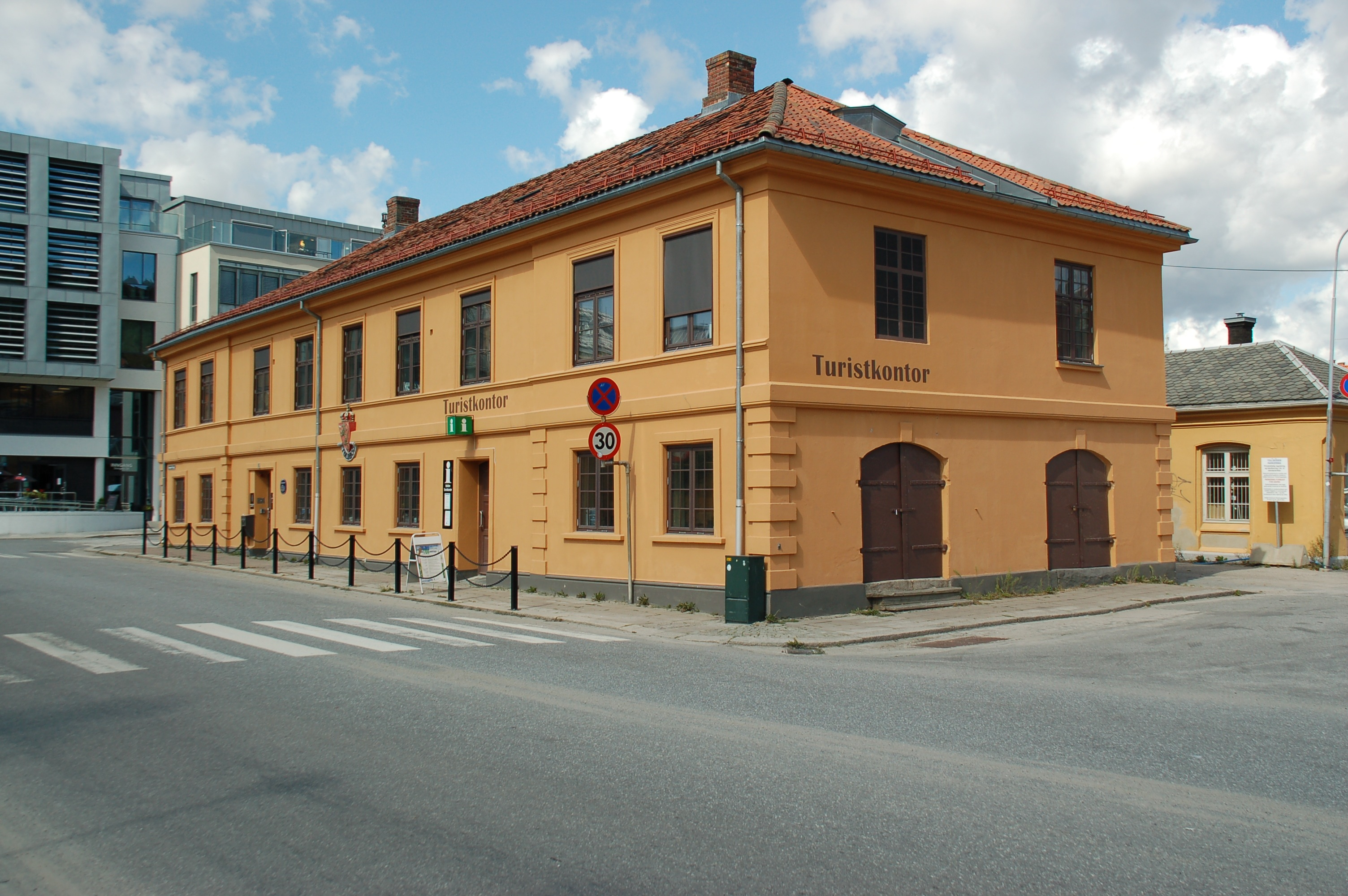
Tollboden Customs House at Halden (redesigned 1842)

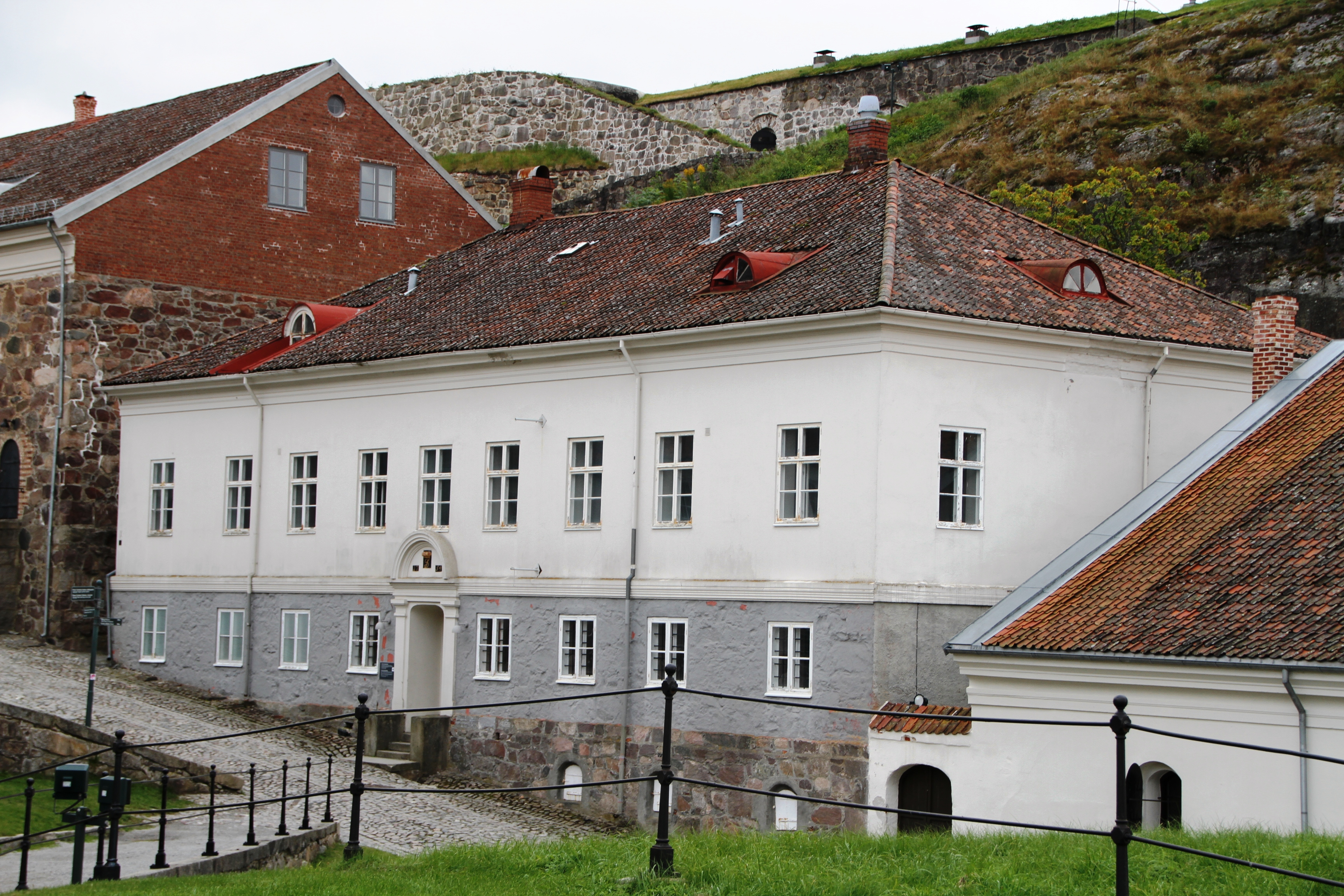
Commander Residence, Fredriksten (1830)

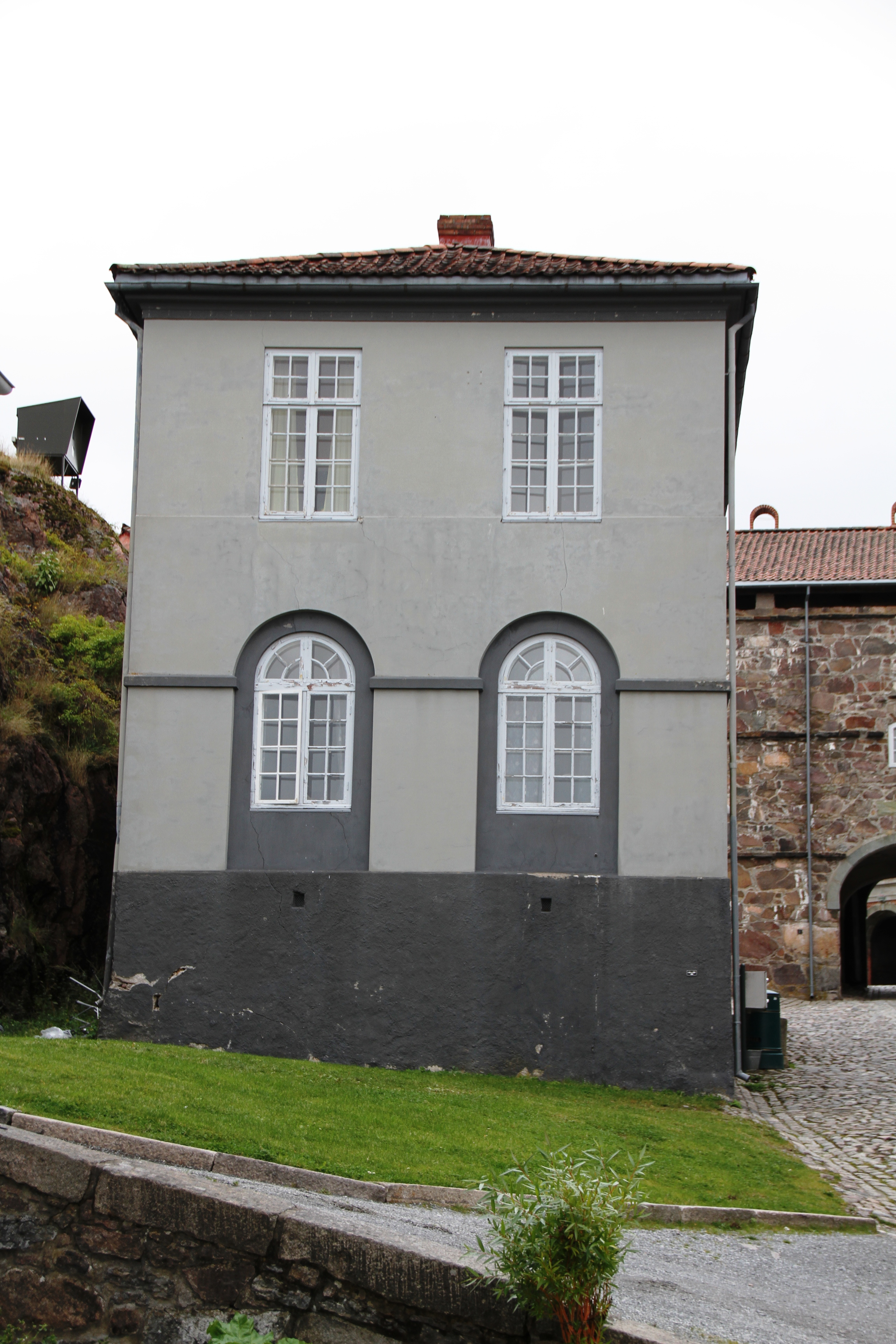
Guardroom, Fredriksten (1840)

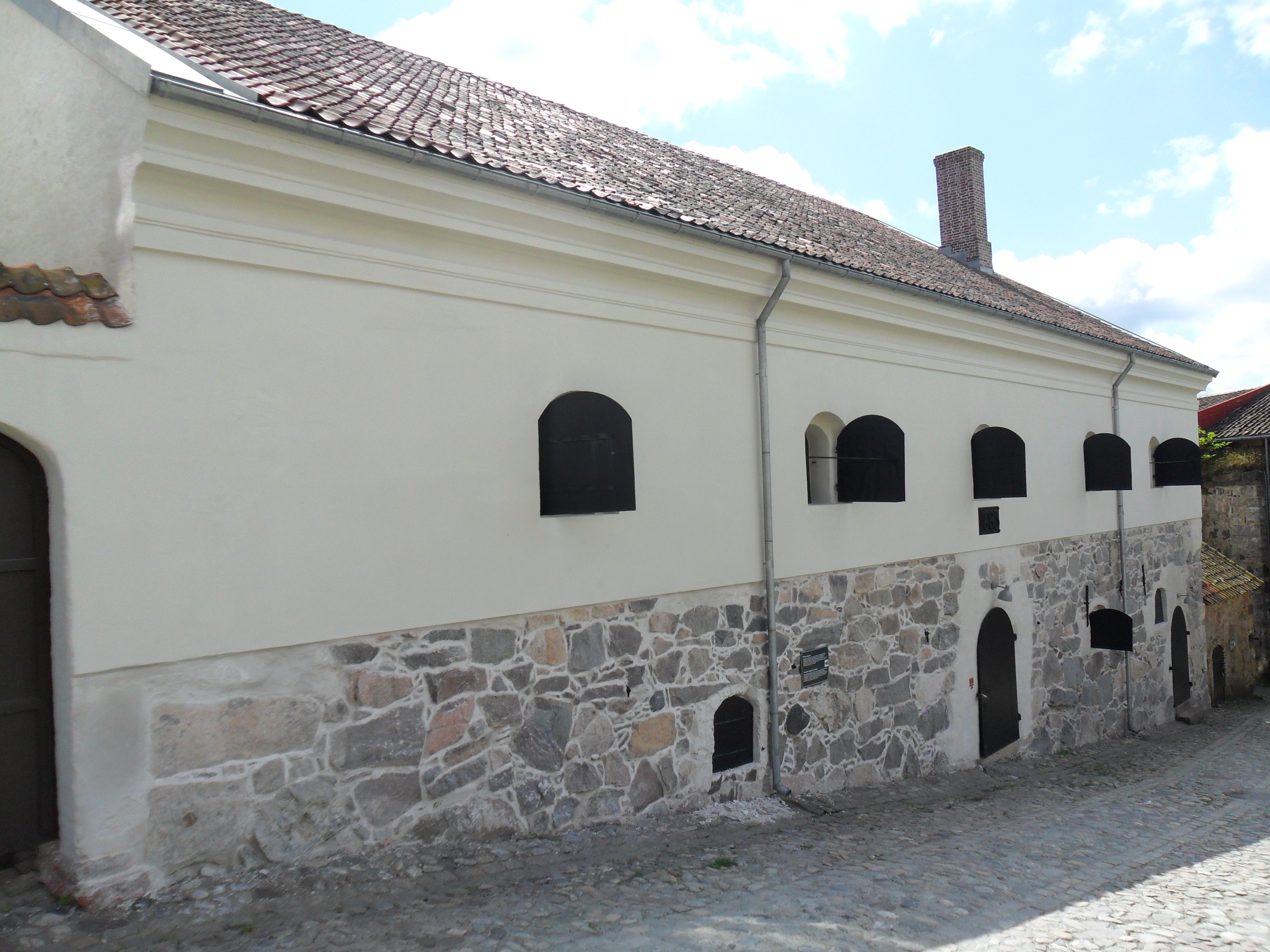
Lower Magazine, Fredriksten (1826)

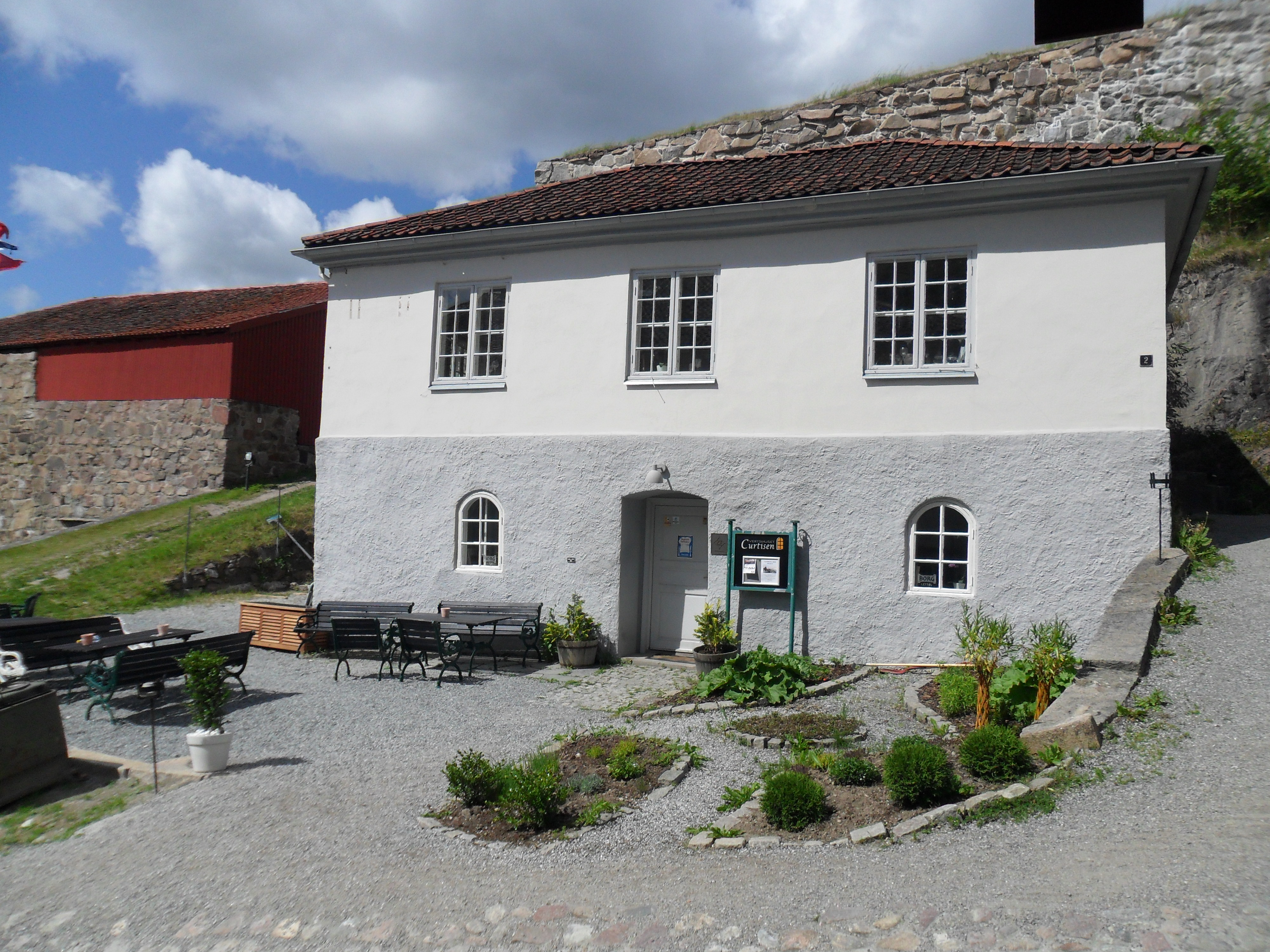
Losje Building, Fredriksten (redesigned 1831)
