= Alexander Zeldin =

British theatre director

- Born: April 24, 1985 (age 41)
- Occupations: Playwright, theatre director
- Writing career
- Language: English
- Genre: Theatre

Alexander Zeldin (born 24 April 1985) is a British dramatist, author, and theatre director.

== Early life ==
Zeldin grew up in Oxford, the son of a Russian-Jewish father and an Australian mother. His father died when he was 15 years old.

== Career ==
Zeldin worked in Russia, South Korea and the Middle East as well as at the Naples Festival, before, between 2011 and 2014, developing a number of his own works as a teacher at East 15 Acting School, where he met several of the actors and creative team that collaborate with him today. At this time, he also worked as an assistant director to Peter Brook and Marie-Hélène Estienne.

His play, Beyond Caring, which told the story of several temporary workers meeting on a night shift in a meat factory, had its premiere at the Yard Theatre in Hackney in 2014, before transferring to the Temporary Theatre at the National Theatre in 2015.

In 2015 he was the recipient of the Quercus Trust Award and was appointed as associate director at Birmingham Repertory Theatre. Beyond Caring toured the UK and a new US production, re-developed for the US by Zeldin and produced by Lookingglass Theater in conjunction with David Schwimmer's company Dark Harbour Stories, opened in Chicago in April 2017.

His play Love opened at the National Theatre in December 2016, before transferring to Birmingham Rep. A European tour took place in 2018 and Love has been made into a film by the BBC and Cuba Pictures. In 2017, he was named Artist in Residence at the National Theatre and in 2018, was the winner of the Arts Foundation twenty-fifth anniversary Fellowship for Literature.

His play, Faith Hope and Charity, at the National Theatre in 2019, where he is now an associate director. From 2020, he has been an associate artist of the Odéon-Théâtre de l'Europe in Paris and was one of the 2021 visiting artists at the Vienna Festwochen, where his three plays up to that date were presented for the first time as THE INEQUALITIES.

Zeldin's next play, The Confessions, opened in Vienna in 2023, before transferring to the Odéon-Théâtre de l'Europe in Paris in October of that year. Like his 2022 French-language production A Death in the Family, The Confessions is based on remembrances of his family, in this case his mother's memories of her early life in Australia. It subsequently transferred to the National Theatre later the same month.

The Confessions was followed in October 2024 by The Other Place, a reimagining of Sophocles' Antigone, also at the National Theatre. Reviewing for The Guardian, Arifa Akbar described it as a "rivetingly naturalistic modern-day reworking", praising its "meticulous underpinning of ideas".

His most recent play, Care, opened at the Young Vic in May 2026, as part of the inaugural season of artistic director Nadia Fall.

== Honours ==
Zeldin was appointed a Chevalier des Arts et des Lettres by the French government in 2024.

== See also ==
- List of British playwrights since 1950
