= Norske Løve Fortress =

Fort in Horten, Norway

Coordinates: 59.4432°N 10.4899°E

Norske Løve
- Horten, Norway
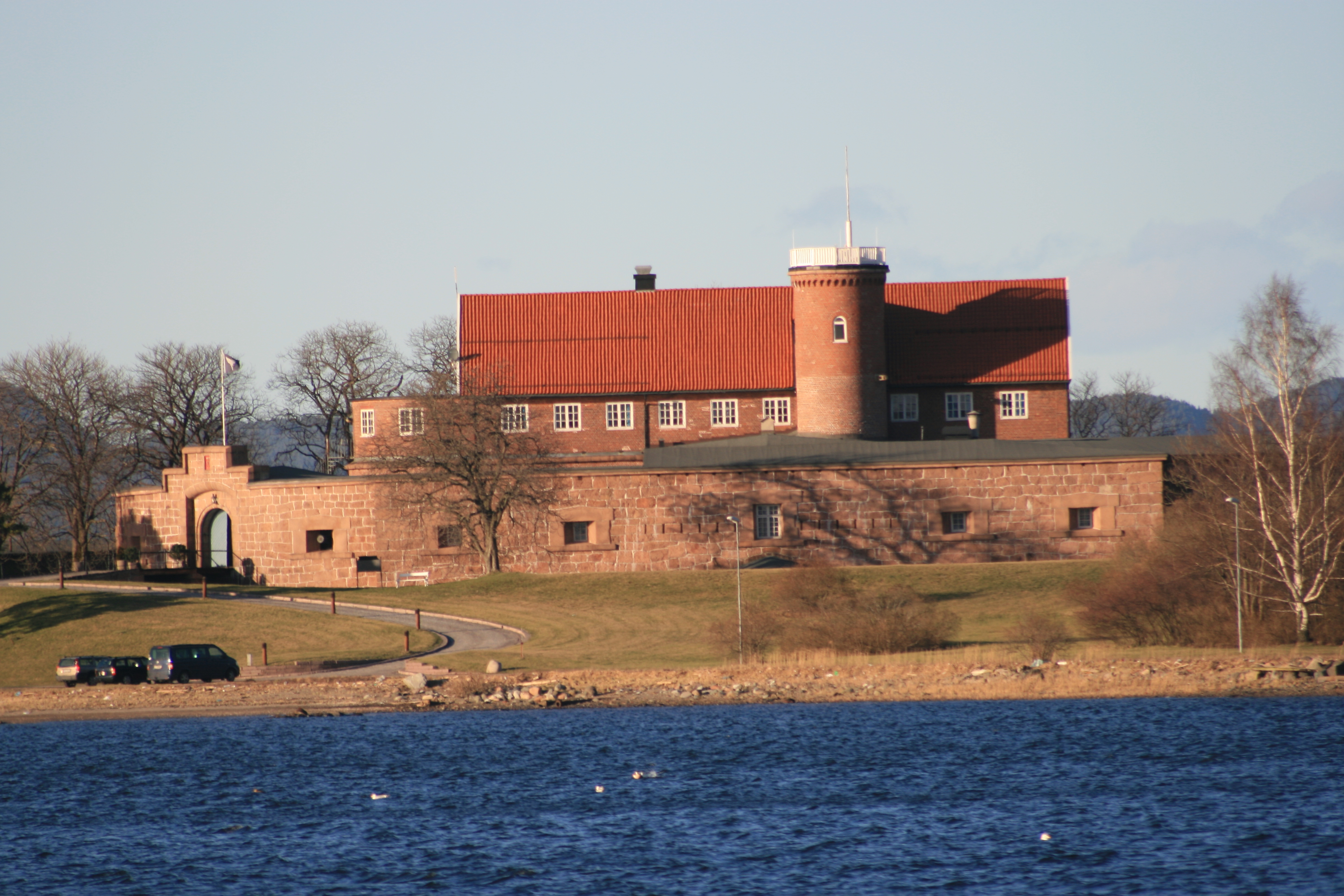
- Norske Løve on Vealøs

Site information
- Controlled by: Norway

Site history
- Built: 1852-1859
- In use: 1852-today
- Materials: Stone

Norske Løve is the name of a 19th-century fortress built from 1852 to 1859 to protect Karljohansvern naval station at Horten in Norway.

== Overview ==
Norske Løve (literally, 'Norwegian Lion') is a reference to the lion on the Coat of Arms of Norway. The fort is still a military area, but is today only used as an administration building for the Norwegian naval officers training school.

The fort was constructed by Baltazar Nicolai Garben. The primary construction material was limestone, reinforced with granite. The fortress structure was fitted with heavy artillery on several floors protected by casemates. It has a moat which can be filled with water and was originally fitted with a circular envelope with 22 open casemates each holding a 3-ton cannon. The fort originally had a complement of 500 men. The open casemates were walled up by the Germans during World War II, but otherwise the fort is largely in its original form.

== Picture Gallery ==
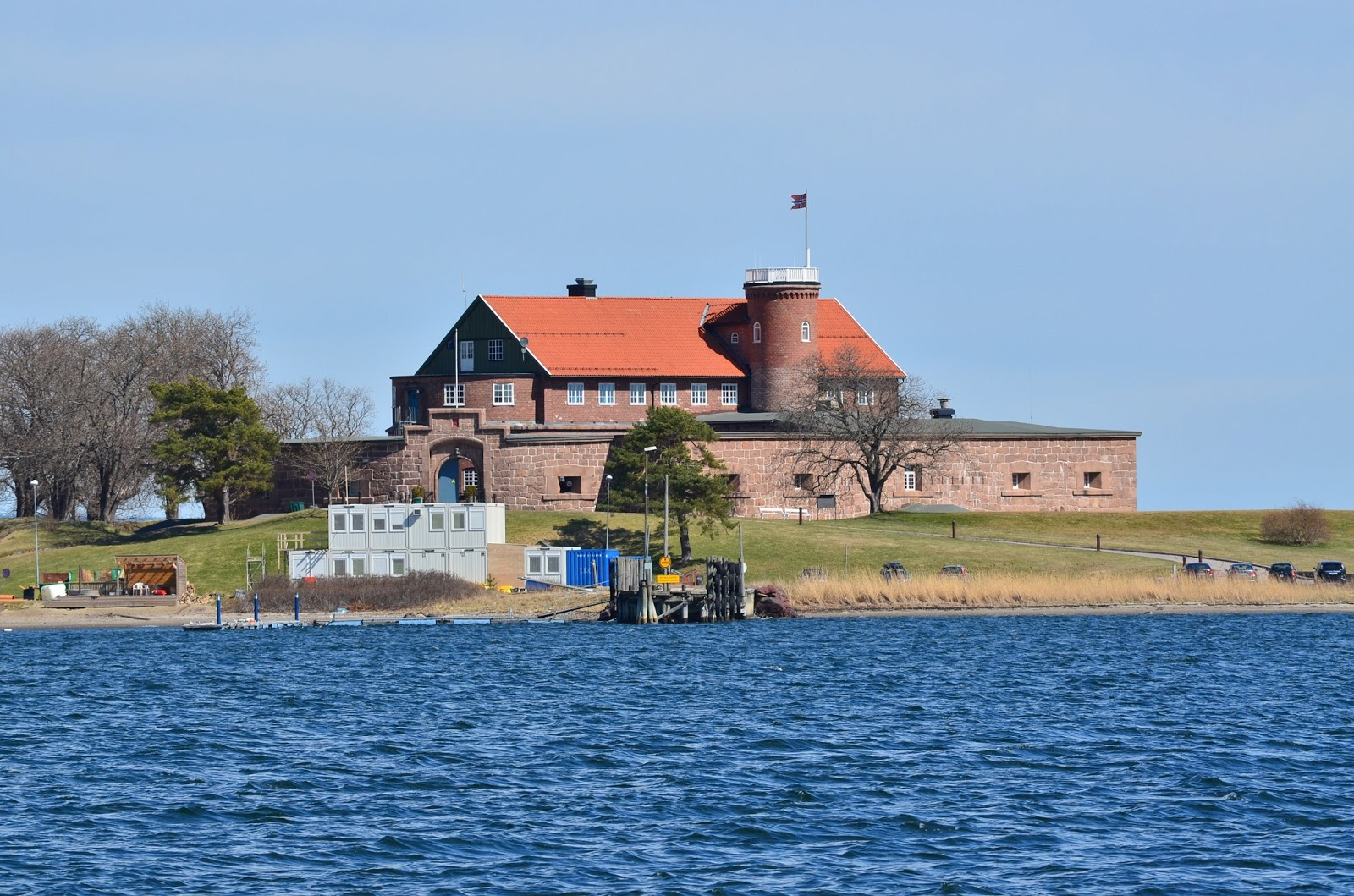
Norske Løve, fortress seen from the south

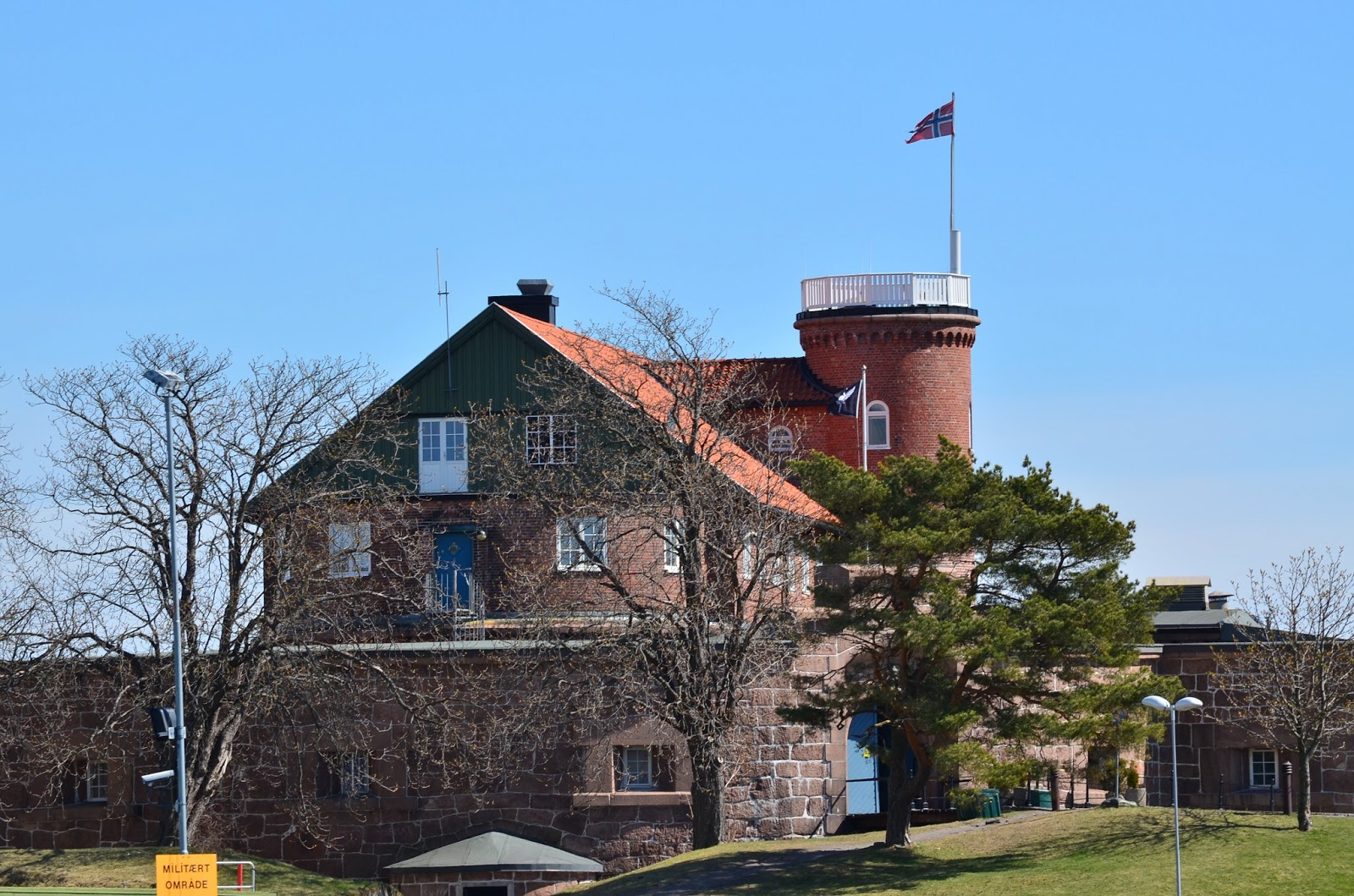
Norske Løve, south-western part of the fortress

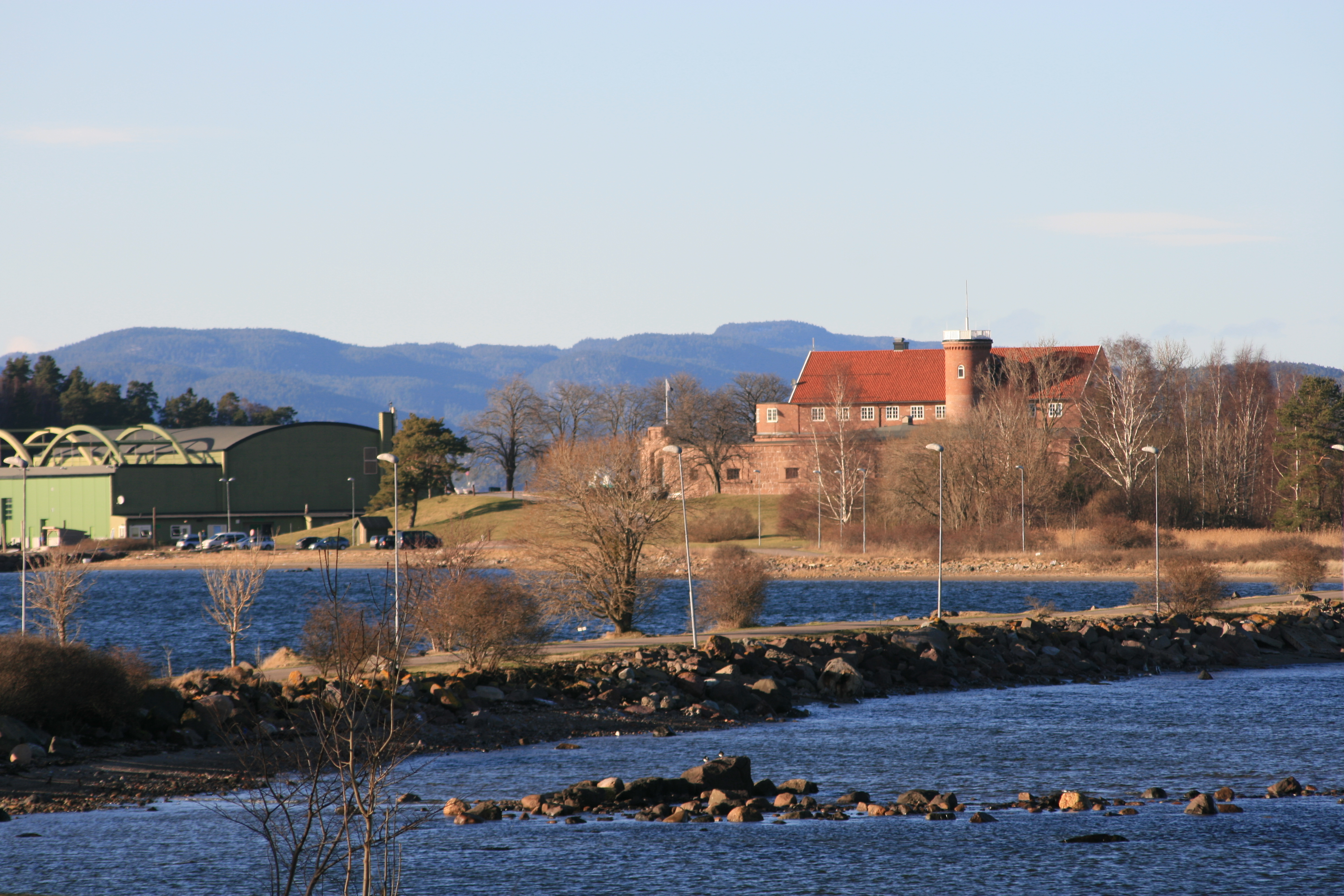
Norske Løve, fortress on Vealøs

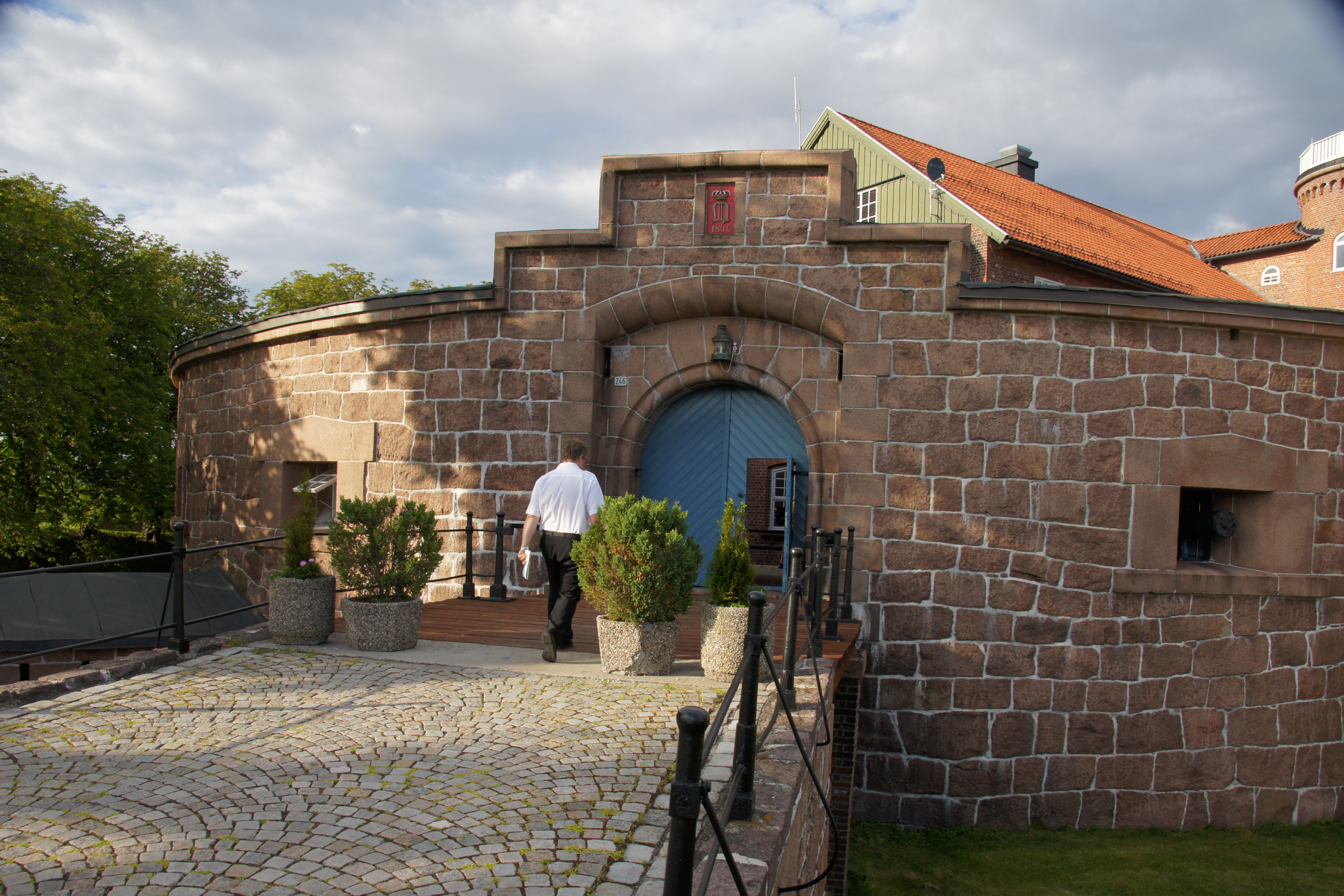
Norske Løve, gateway

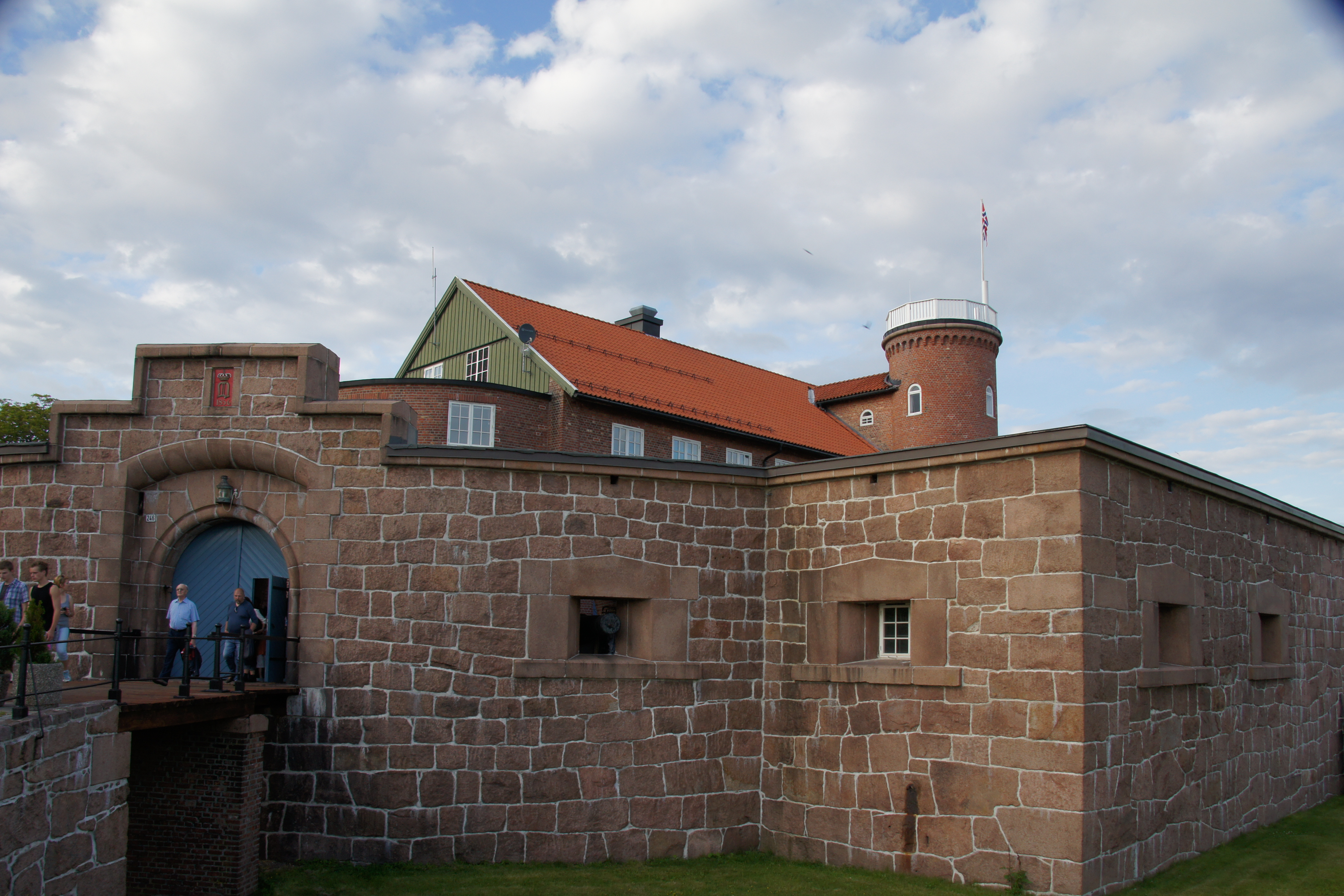
Norske Løve, outer wall and moat at the entrance

== See also ==
- Citadellet
