= Karljohansvern =

Naval base in Norway, 1850 to 1963

Coordinates: 59°25′57.60″N 10°29′25.45″E

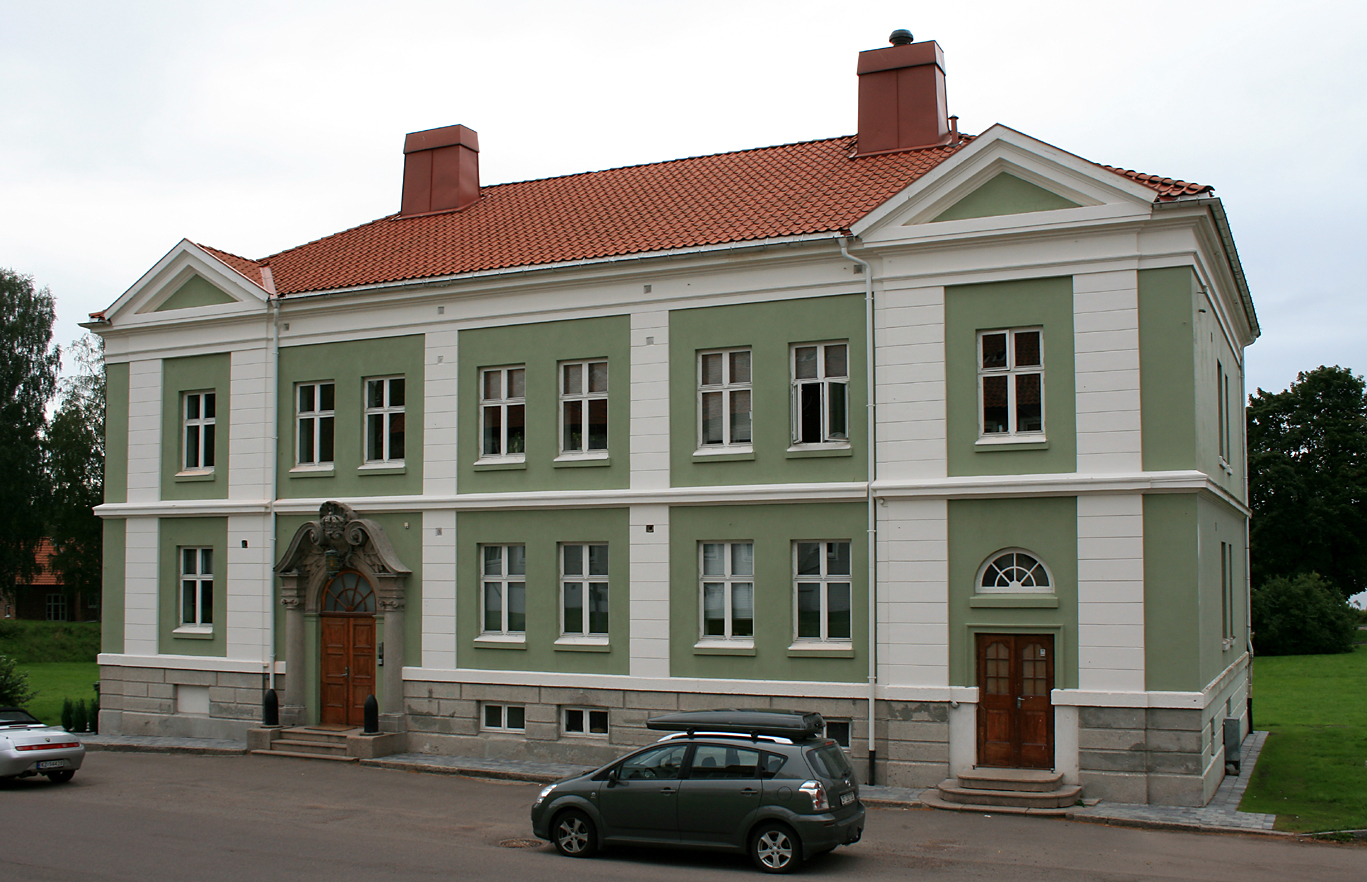
Karljohansvern administration and chief residential buildings

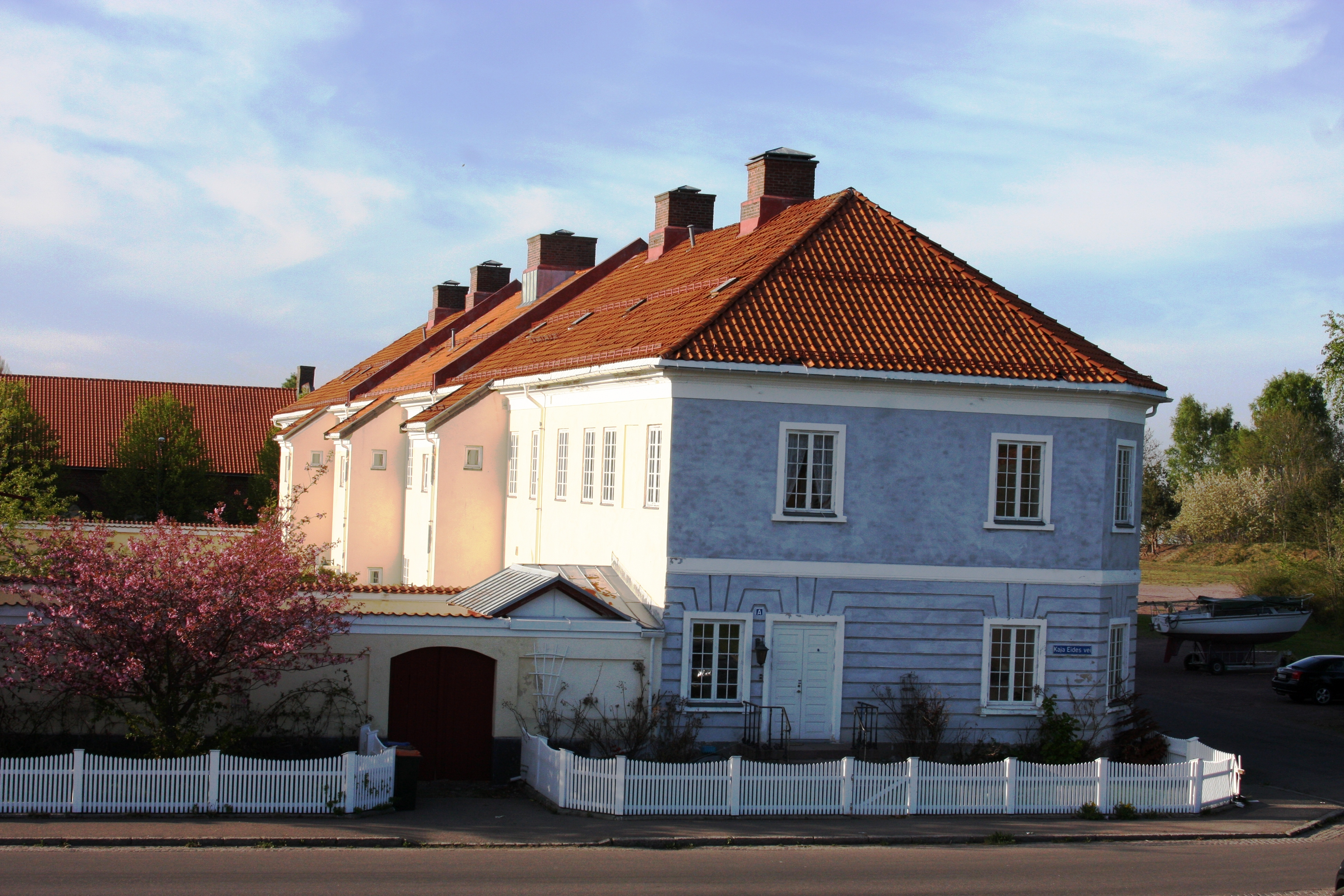
Karljohansvern military facility

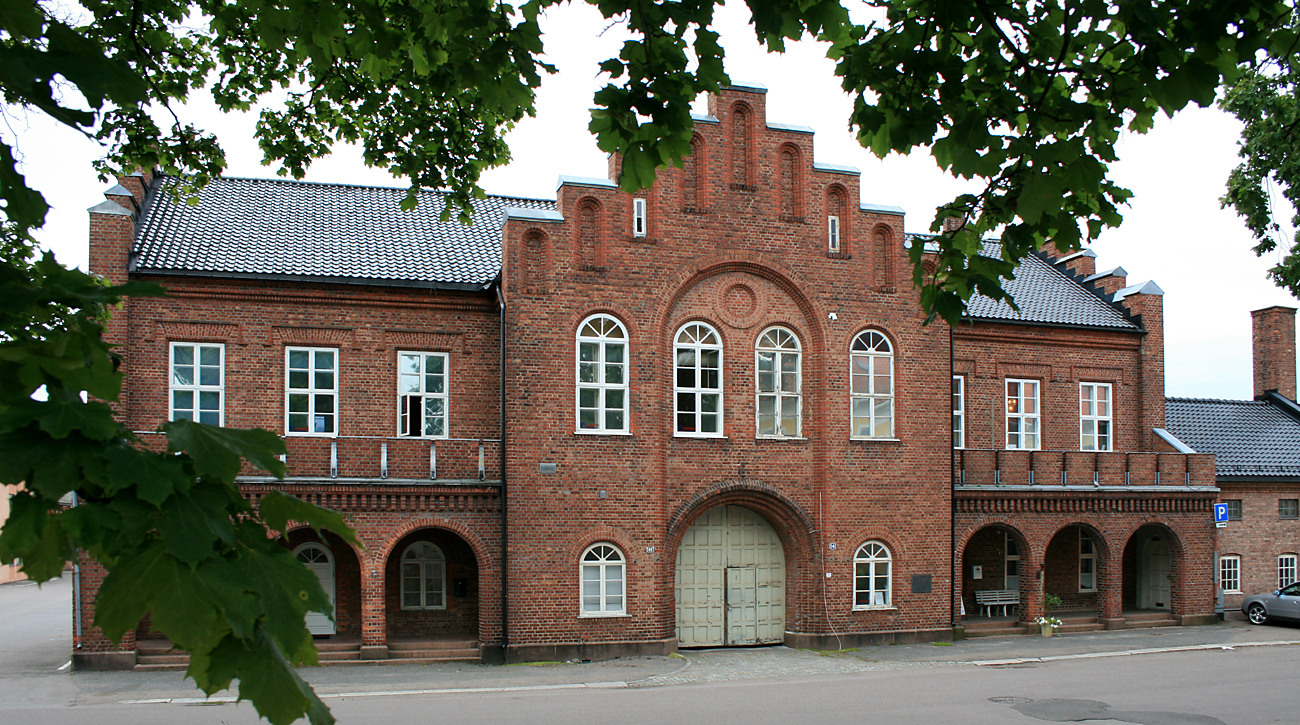
Karljohansvern guard house

Karljohansvern (Karljohansvern Orlogsstasjon, KJV) at Horten was the main base for the Royal Norwegian Navy from 1850 to 1963.

== Background ==
In 1818, it was decided to establish a naval base in Horten. It was first called Hortens verft, and later Marinens Hovedværft until King Oscar I named it Carljohansværn værft in 1854 (after his father Karl Johan). The shipyards was begun in 1820 and the first launch, a frigate, was in 1828.

On 9 April 1940 during the German invasion of Norway, a battle took place in the harbour when the Germans attempted to seize the base. The naval attack was repulsed, but German troops managed to outflank the Norwegians and force them to capitulate. Karljohansvern remained in German hands for the rest of World War II, while the ships operating out of it were pressed into their service.

In 1953, the Norwegian Parliament determined the Navy's main base should be moved to Bergen. When the new headquarters at Haakonsvern was officially opened in 1963, a number of functions were transferred from Karljohansvern. In 1968, the National Government took over the shipyard and renamed it A/S Horten Verft. which was closed down in 1987. The Officer Candidate School for the Navy remained on site until 2005. The Naval District East (ØSD) based there was disbanded in 2002. The Royal Norwegian Navy Museum (Marinemuseet) and the fortress Norske Løve on Vealøs remain. Only the island of Vealøs, which is connected to Horten with a bridge, is still owned by the Department of Defence. The whole island is still a military area, and the area is cordoned off with fencing, video surveillance and guard booths.

The former shipyard has been converted into an industrial park, Horten Industripark. The Royal Norwegian Navy Museum and the Royal Norwegian Navy Band (Horten), a department of the Norwegian Defence Research Establishment and some of the Navy's school administration are still present. In 2001, Preus Museum moved to the former naval facility. As of 2006, the entire base including 73 buildings has been given protected heritage status by the Norwegian Directorate for Cultural Heritage.

== Picture gallery ==
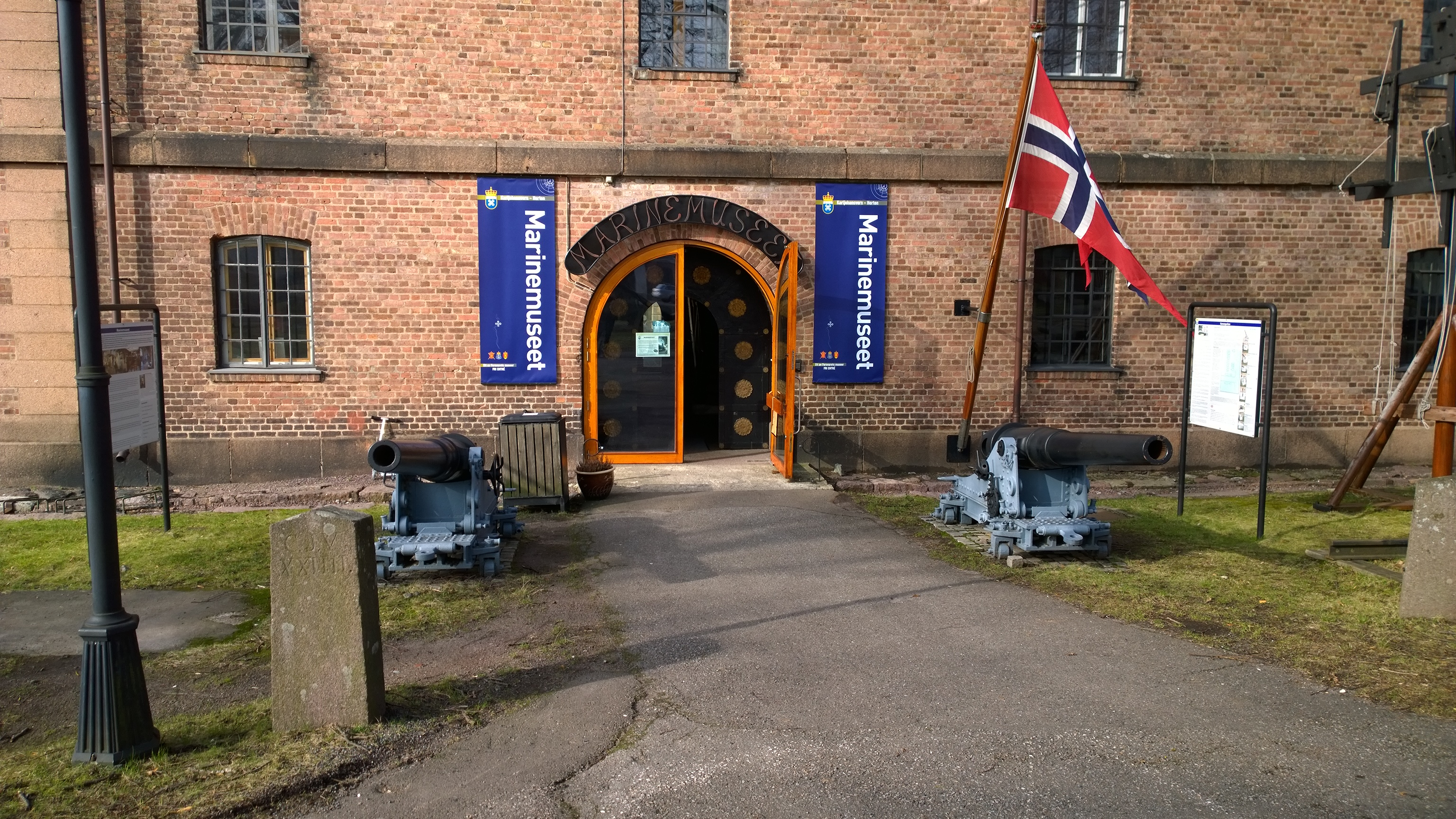
Royal Norwegian Navy Museum

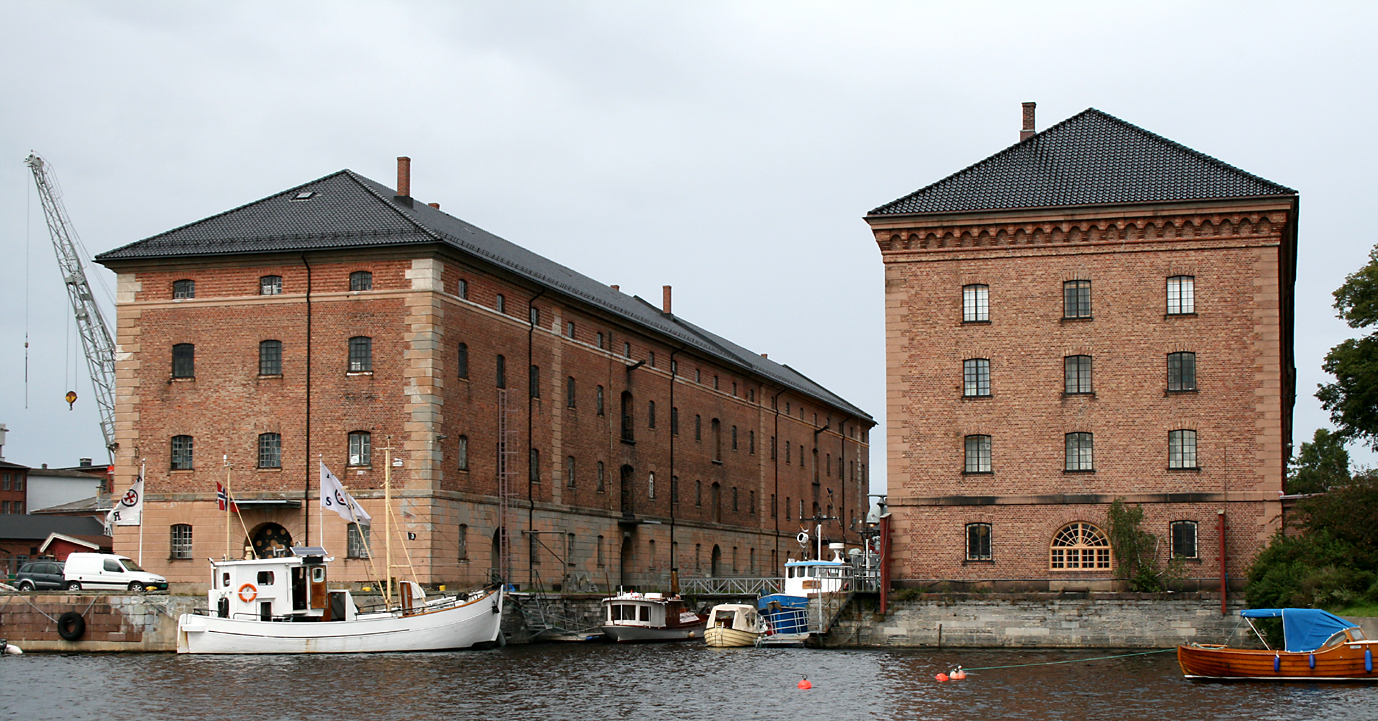
Artillery Magazine

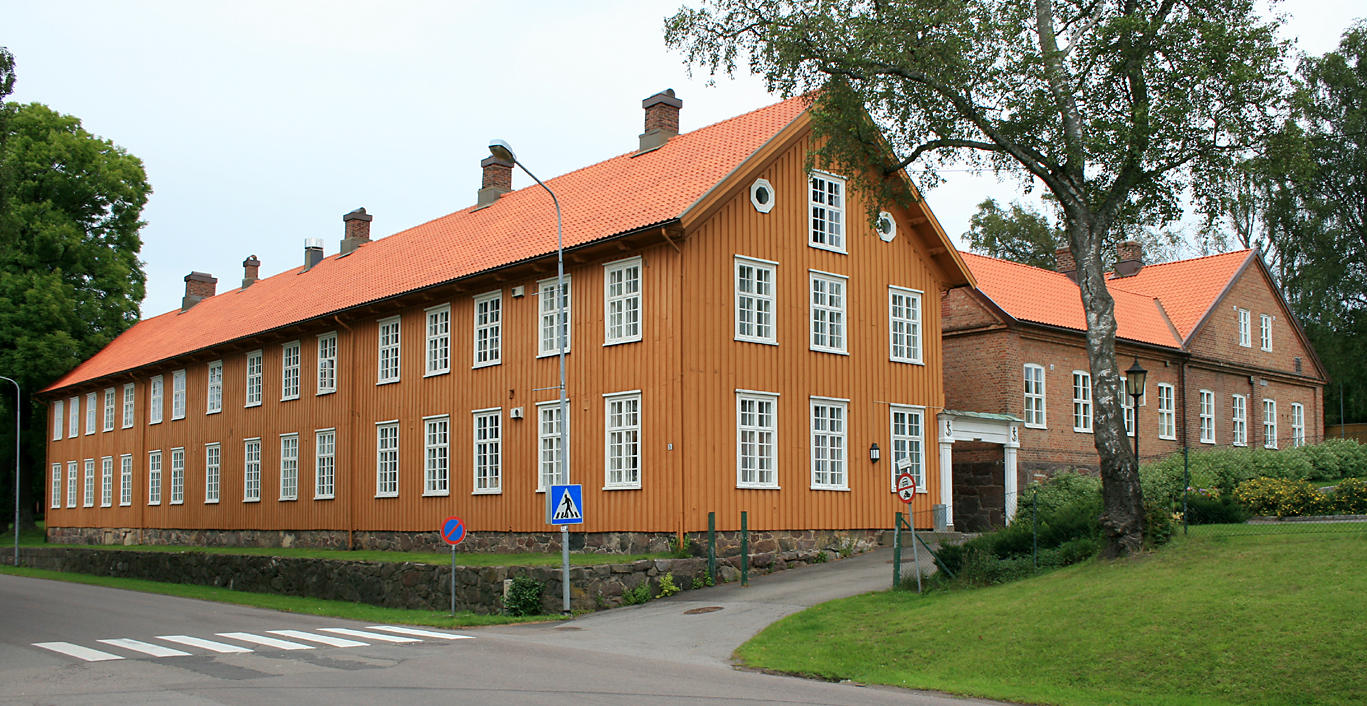
Naval Corps Barracks

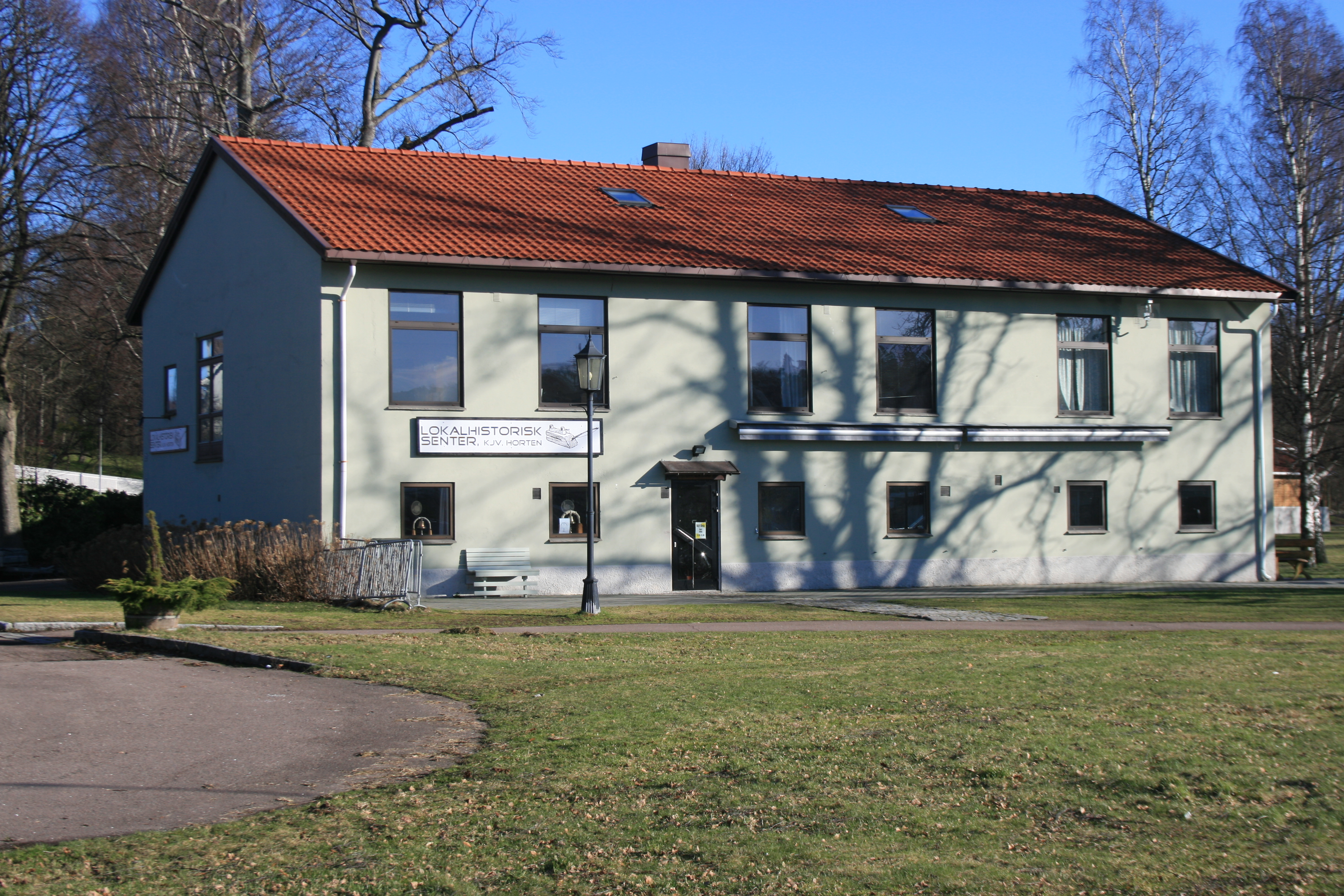
Local History Center

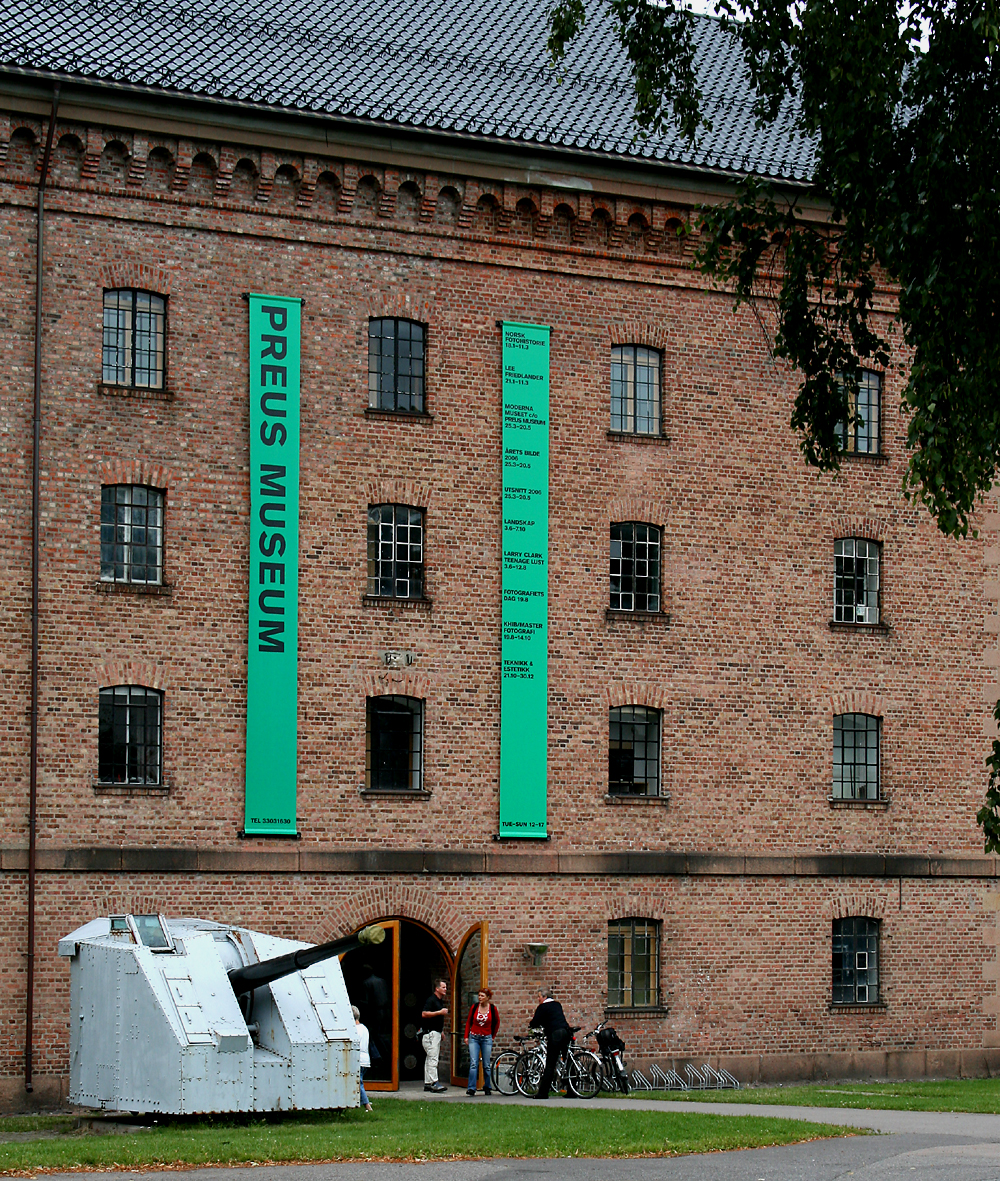
Preus Museum

== See also ==
- Citadellet
- Norske Løve Fortress
