= Bhalobasa Bhalobasa =

Bhalobasa Bhalobasa (lit. 'Love Love' or 'Love is Love' in Bengali) may refer to:

- Bhalobasa Bhalobasa (1985 film), a 1985 Indian film directed by Tarun Majumdar, starring Tapas Paul and Deboshree Roy
- Bhalobasa Bhalobasa (2008 film), a 2008 Indian film directed by Ravi Kinagi, starring Hiran Chatterjee and Shrabanti Chatterjee

== See also ==
- Valobasha, Bengali term for love
- Akash Chhoa Bhalobasa, a 2008 Bangladeshi film
- Love Love (disambiguation)
- Love Is Love (disambiguation)
