= Citadellet =

19th-century Norwegian fortress

Coordinates: 59°25′42″N 10°29′04″E

- Horten, Norway
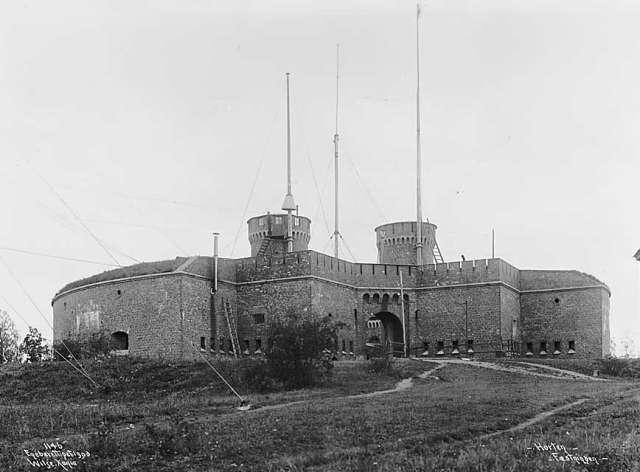
- Citadellet in 1903

Site information
- Controlled by: Norway

Site history
- Built: 1848-1851
- In use: Decommissioned September 7, 1970
- Materials: Stone

Citadellet (Citadel) was a 19th-century Norwegian fortress. The last day of military activity was in 1970. The fort was demolished in 1971.

Citadellet was intended to protect the Royal Norwegian Navy's Karljohansvern naval station in Horten. Karjohansvern was the main base for the Royal Norwegian Navy from 1819 to 1963. The fortress was built between 1848 and 1851. Its architect was Christian Heinrich Grosch (1801-1865). The fort were established in conjunction with Norske Løve Fortress which was built between 1852 and 1859. Specific plans for the design of both fortifications were first completed in the mid-1830s, based upon designs largely begun in the 1820s. The forts were expected to assume a key role as defender of the fleet and defense against attacks from the sea.

== Gallery ==
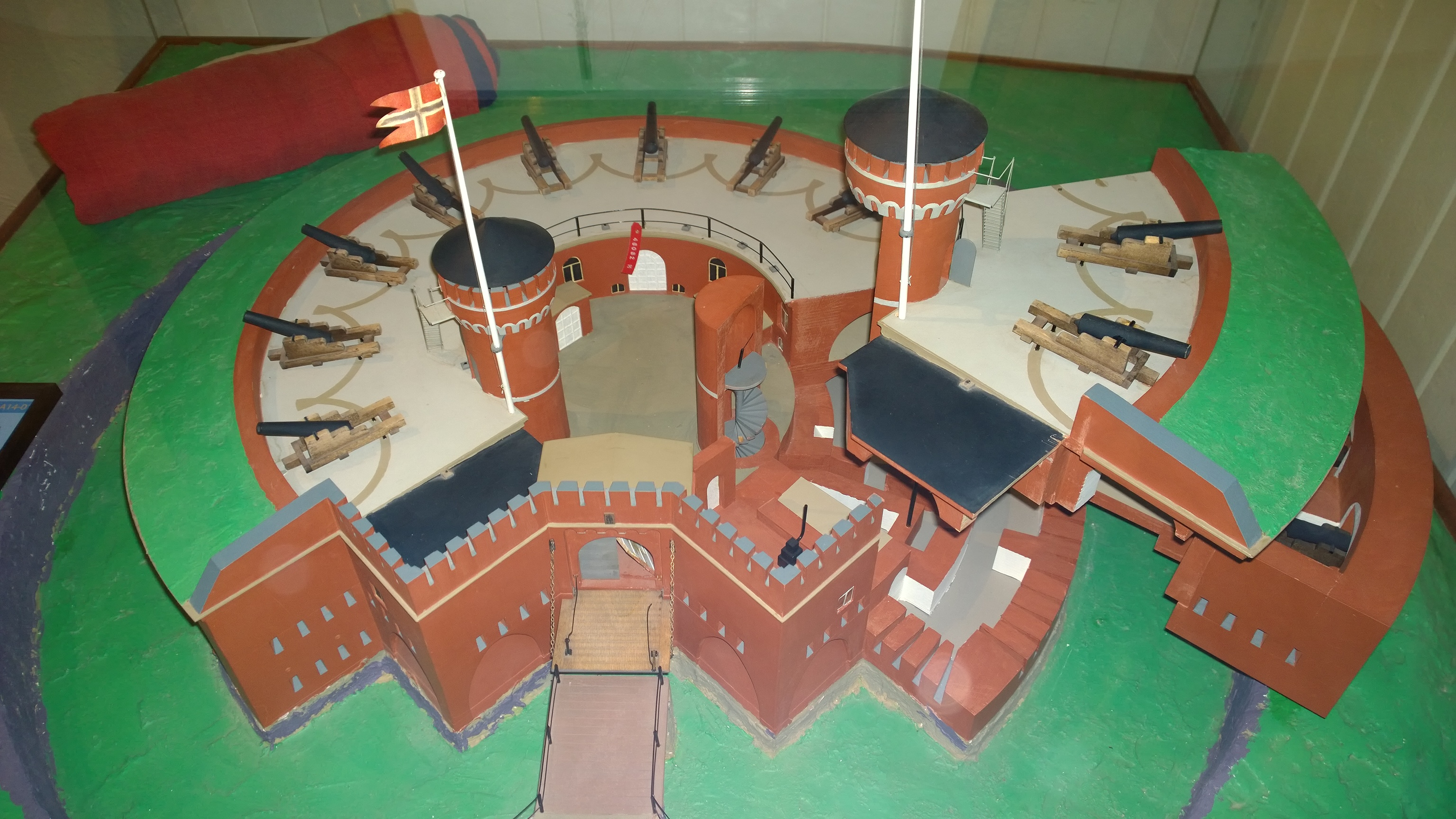
Model of Citadellet

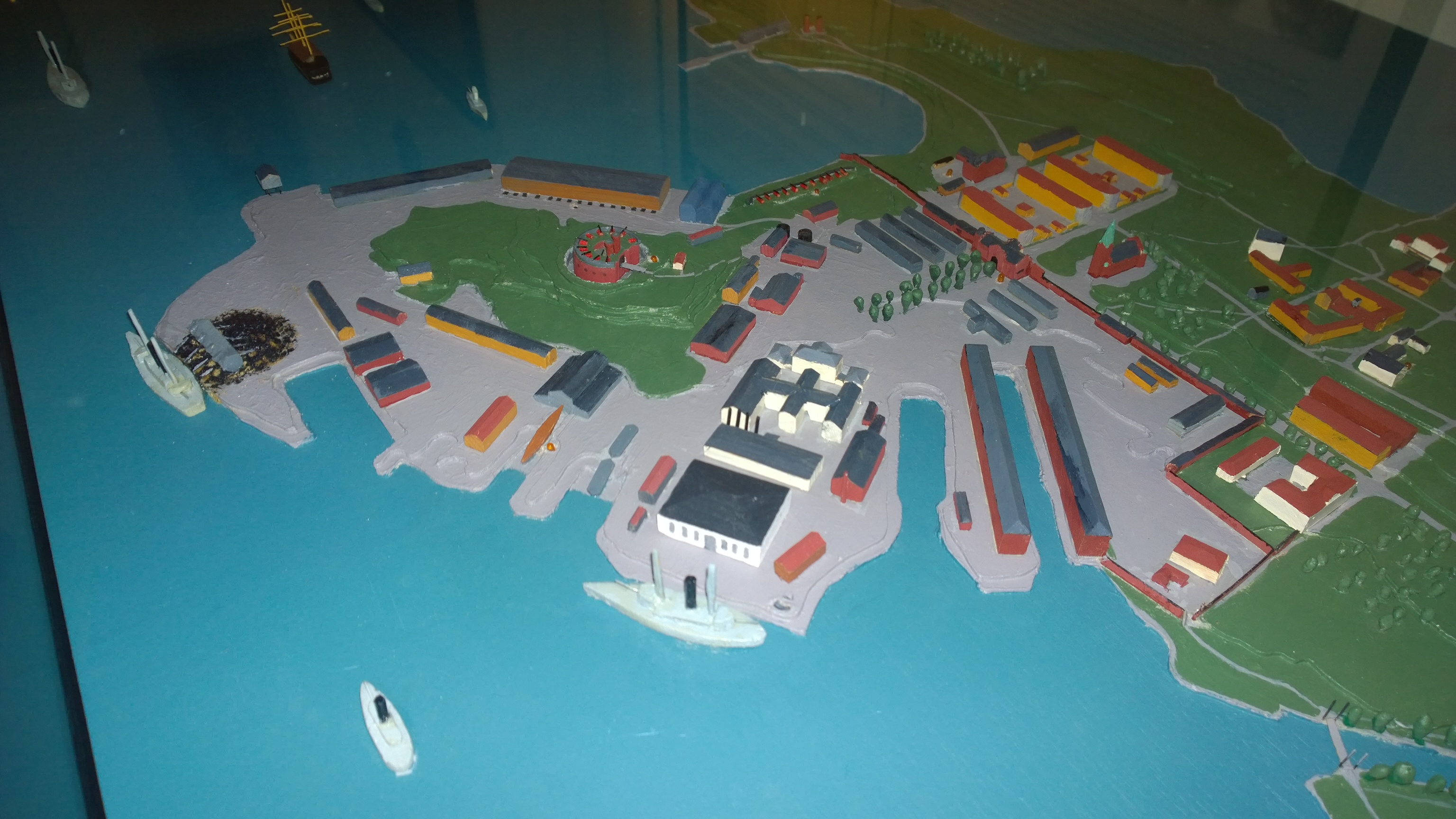
Model of Karljohansvern.
