= Bernice Love Wiggins =

American poet (1897–1936)

- Born: March 4, 1897; Austin, Texas. U.S.
- Died: January 27, 1936 (aged 38)
- Resting place: Evergreen Cemetery, Los Angeles
- Other name: Bernice Love Clay
- Occupation: Poet
- Movement: Harlem Renaissance

Bernice Love Wiggins (also Bernice Love Clay, March 4, 1897 – January 27, 1936) was an African-American poet writing during the Harlem Renaissance period. Her work was published in the El Paso Herald, the Chicago Defender, the Houston Informer, and other newspapers across Texas. Her one volume of poems, Tuneful Tales, was published in 1925.

== Biography ==
Wiggins was born on March 4, 1897, in Austin, Texas. Her father, Jessie Austin Love, was also a poet. He had also attended college, and was the Sunday school director for the Holiness Church in Austin. When she was orphaned in 1903, she was raised in El Paso, Texas, by an aunt, Margaret Spiller. Wiggins attended the segregated Douglass school in El Paso, and when she later published her poetry, she dedicated it to one of her teachers, Alice Lydia McGowan, and her former principal, William Coleman, wrote the introduction. In the introduction, Coleman shares that at an early age she had "natural poetic feelings".

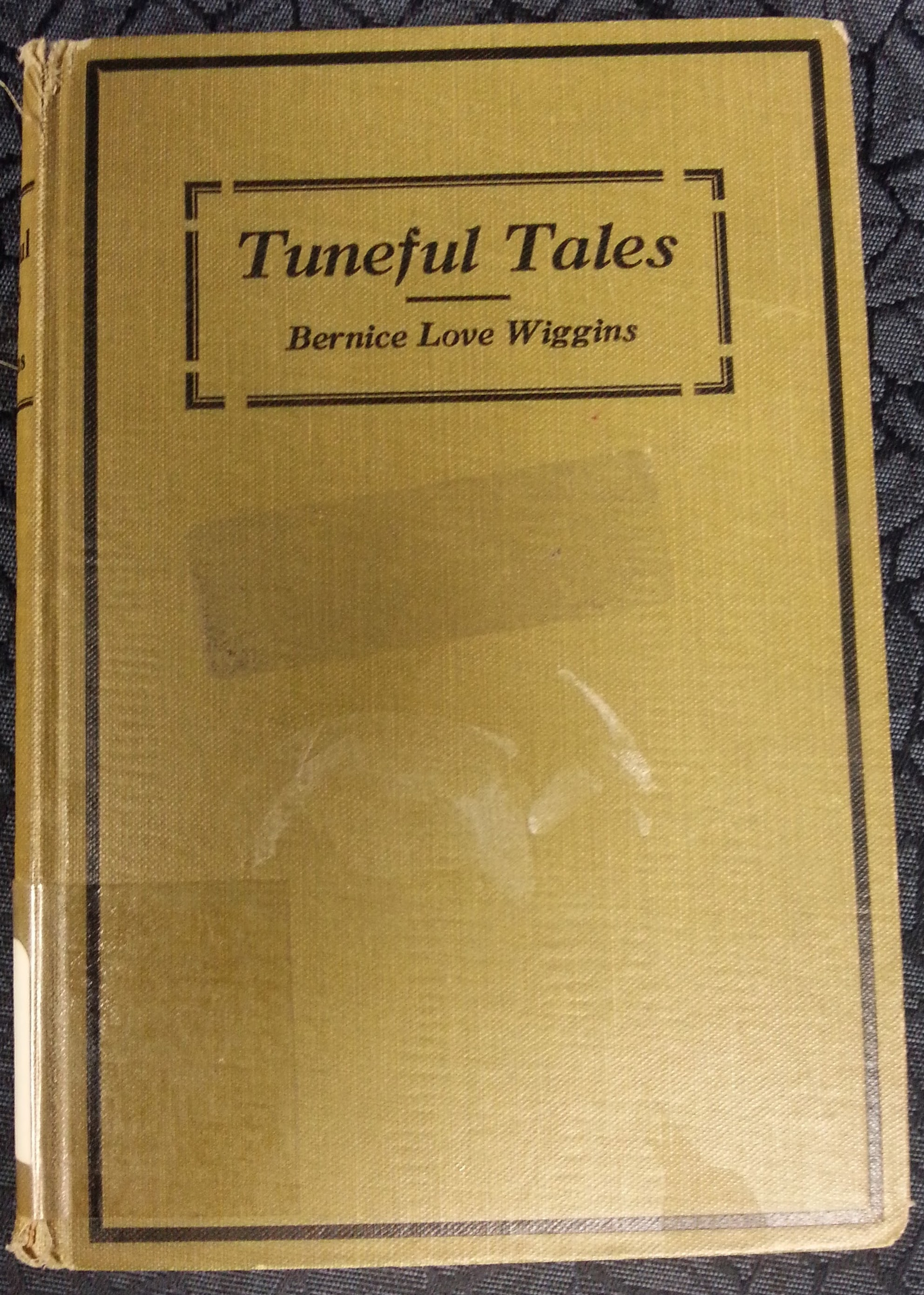
The cover of Love Wiggins's Tuneful Tales (1925)

Wiggins married Allen D. Wiggins in 1915. Wiggins divorced sometime in the 1920s and moved to Los Angeles, California. She married Thomas Brackett Clay and lived in Los Angeles, though not much is known about her life in this period.

She died on January 27, 1936, and was buried as Bernice Love Clay in the Evergreen Cemetery in Los Angeles.

== Work ==
Her volume of poetry, Tuneful Tales (1925), contains 102 poems that are written in dialect form. Her poetic tone and style link her to the Harlem Renaissance. Wiggins' poetry focused on her experience of the black community of her time. She also wrote poetry about racial discrimination, lynching and poverty. She "condemned the injustice of laws against prostitution" in her poem "The Vampire".
