= Love Love Love =

Love Love Love may refer to:

== Film, TV, and theatre ==
- Love Love Love (1989 film), a Bollywood film
- Love, Love, Love (1974 film), a Taiwanese film
- Love Love Love (2017 film), a Nepalese film
- "Love, Love, Love" (Glee), an episode of Glee
- Love Love Love (play), a 2010 play by Mike Bartlett
- Love! Love! Love!, a 2022 CBBC series hosted by Shereen Cutkelvin which essentially replaced The Playlist

== Music ==
=== Albums ===
- LOVE! LOVE! & LOVE!, a 1991 album by Original Love
- Love Love Love (Linda Chung album), 2012
- Love Love Love (Roy Kim album), 2013
- Love, Love, Love (Stephen Sanchez album), 2026

=== Songs ===
- "Love Love Love" (Agnes song), 2009
- "Love Love Love" (Avalanche City song), 2010
- "Love Love Love" (James Blunt song), 2008
- "Love Love Love/Arashi ga Kuru", a 1995 single by Japanese band Dreams Come True
- "Love Love Love" (Lenny Kravitz song), 2008
- "Love Love Love" (Webb Pierce song), 1955, written by Ted Jarrett
- "Love Love Love", a song by After School from the 2010 album Happy Pledis 1st Album
- "Love, Love, Love (Love, Love)", a song by As Tall As Lions from the 2006 album As Tall As Lions
- "Love, Love, Love", a song by Joe Beats
- "Love Love Love", a song by Chilly
- "Love, Love, Love", a song by Epik High from the 2007 album Remapping the Human Soul
- "Love Love Love", a song by F.T. Island
- "Love, Love, Love", a song by Donny Hathaway
- "Love Love Love", a song by Bobby Hebb
- "Love Love Love", a song by Big Thief from the 2022 album Dragon New Warm Mountain I Believe in You
- "Love Love Love", a single by Ken Hirai from the 2000 album The Changing Same
- "Love Love Love", a song by Of Monsters and Men from the 2011 album My Head Is an Animal
- "Love Love Love", a song by The Mountain Goats from the 2005 album The Sunset Tree
- "Love Love Love", a song by The Queers from the 1990 album Grow Up
- "Love Love Love", a song by Secret Life
- "Love Love Love", a song by Sinitta from the 1989 album Wicked
- "Love Love Love", a song by Jolin Tsai from the 2004 album Castle
- "Love Love Love", a song by Pere Ubu from the 1989 album Cloudland

== See also ==
- Love Love (disambiguation)
- "It's Love-Love-Love", a 1944 song popularized by Guy Lombardo
