= Love (2016 play) =

2016 play written by Alexander Zeldin

- Written by: Alexander Zeldin
- Original language: English
- Genre: Drama

Premiere
- Date premiered: 6 December 2016
- Place premiered: Dorfman Theatre, National Theatre, London

Love (stylized as LOVE) is a 2016 British play written by Alexander Zeldin. It is about a group of families who have been placed in temporary accommodation in the run-up to Christmas.

== Production history ==
The play premiered in the Dorfman Theatre at the National Theatre, London running from 6 December 2016 to 10 January 2017, before transferring to The Studio at the Birmingham Repertory Theatre from 26 January to 11 February 2017. The production later transferred to the Queen's Theatre, Hornchurch from 25 to 28 October 2018.

A BBC film adaptation was first broadcast on BBC 2 on 8 December 2018.

The play made its North American debut at the Park Avenue Armory running from February 25 until March 25, 2023.

== Plot ==
The story of two families living in temporary British housing accommodation.

== Critical reception ==
The Guardian wrote "It is filled with observant compassion but at first I found myself craving more political anger."

The Daily Beast called Love "The most powerful piece of theater currently being staged in New York."
