= Loved (video game) =

2010 browser-based platform video game

- Promotional image
- Developer(s): Alexander Ocias
- Publisher(s): Alexander Ocias
- Engine: Adobe Flash
- Platform(s): Browser
- Release: 14 June 2010
- Genre(s): Platform
- Mode(s): Single-player

Loved is a browser-based platform video game developed by Alexander Ocias, an Australian graphic designer and artist. Written in Adobe Flash, the game was built over the course of about half a year in Ocias' spare time. Released online on 14 June 2010 onto various game hosting websites, it has garnered sizeable praise and scrutiny since its release, with critics finding the game to be thought-provoking while having poor controls.

== Gameplay ==
A colourful motif appears throughout the environment if the character disobeys the narrator's instructions.

A narrator first asks players, "are you a man, or a woman?" Players who select "man" are instead told they are a "girl". Similarly, players who select "woman" are called a "boy". Navigation is by arrow keys, which also control the ability to jump and duck. The narrator instructs players intermittently, sometimes to achieve goals but often to suggest actions that will kill the player character (such as falling into a pit full of spikes). Players are sometimes, but not always, congratulated when following these instructions, while disobeying the narrator results in a barrage of insults. Both the player character and environment are in stark black and white, with a colourful motif appearing if the character disobeys the narrator's instructions, or the visuals becoming more detailed but still in monochrome if the character decides to be compliant.

== Development ==
Loved was built over the course of about half a year, transforming from the exploration genre to a mining- and building-based adventure game before settling on the platform genre. Ocias worked on the game intermittently in his spare time, using his "bit of self-taught programming knowledge" to code it. Although no libraries were used during development, Ocias expressed that he wished that he had during the end of production. Research was taken into achieving "certain little fiddly things," Ocias explained, such as generating the text elements and instructing Flash to read his tile maps.

According to Ocias, the main themes of Loved were of dominance and power, since to provide a fuller answer would "defy the point of the game". His intentions in making the game were to get people to think about the games they were playing—a direction he found much of the video game industry shying away from. The confrontational aspect of the game was motivated by two aspects: primarily to use "the resource of emotions" invoked by its risk and reward mechanic; and secondly to absorb the awareness of people online. Expanding upon his inspirations, Ocias cited individual games such as The Last Guardian and Deus Ex: Human Revolution, along with companies such as Thatgamecompany and Eidos Montréal, as showing "greater depth" to video games as well as experimentation and research. Ocias ultimately stated that while he dislikes "force-feeding" players, he would try to take a different approach both mechanically and thematically for his next game.

== Release and reception ==
Loved was published as freeware onto Newgrounds and Kongregate, as well as Ocias's official website, on 14 June 2010. Since its release, the game has received sizeable praise and scrutiny from players, with some responding reminiscently over it. Duncan Geere of Wired dubbed it "great high-brow lunchtime gaming" that exploits the paradox of video games being supposedly a better medium than music and films, despite most gamers being compliant by design. Writing for Rock, Paper, Shotgun, Kieron Gillen called the atmosphere "genuinely oppressive" and the game's cogitation between free will and control "really quite excellent". A review in the Italian magazine Dude named it one of their top 16 favourite independent games. Outlet The A.V. Club rated the game a B, noting the game's open interpretation and themes of obedience and rebellion, and claiming that "what it lacks in subtlety, it makes up for with interesting aesthetic choices."

In interviewing Ocias, Justin Kranzl of Gamasutra called the experience of playing the game challenging of the "assumptions people may hold about the respective weight of narrative and play mechanics". Kris Ligman of PopMatters called the controls frustrating and "only just playable", but disregarded this as "all it needs in order to work". Chris Priestman of Kill Screen found the game provoking of "gut reactions" and noted a sexual undercurrent throughout it. Referred to by Gillen, Michael Rose of IndieGames.com called the controls "a little wonky", but concluded that it was "definitely worth giving a go". Tim W. of the same website ranked the game second place of the top 10 browser platformers of 2010. Rose later published in his book 250 Indie Games You Must Play that the game is worth playing twice to see the alternative endings based on the player's decisions. Writing for the official website of G4, Brittany Vincent called the game "especially curious" in its depiction of a dominant and submissive relationship and a "fantastic case" of the medium "pushing the margins of human emotion".
