= Love Love =

Love Love is the title of:

== Arts, entertainment, media ==
- Love Love?, also styled LOVE♥LOVE?, a 2004 anime television series
- Love Love, a 2015 novel by Sung J. Woo

=== Songs ===
- "Love Love" (Amy McDonald song), 2010
- "Love Love" (Take That song), 2011
- "L-O-V-E (Love)", a 1975 single by Al Green
- "L-O-V-E, Love", a 1990 song by Steve Wariner off the album Laredo

== Other uses ==
- Jeanneau Love Love, a French sailboat design

== See also ==
- "You Love Love", a 1983 song by Bucks Fizz on their album Hand Cut
- Love Love Love (disambiguation)
- Love (disambiguation)
- Bhalobasa Bhalobasa (disambiguation) (Bengali: Love Love), Indian films so titled
