= Löve =

Löve is a surname derived from "Lion". Notable people with the name include:

- Áskell Löve (1916–1994), Icelandic systematic botanist
- Doris Löve (1918–2000), Swedish systematic botanist
- Þorsteinn Löve (1923 – 2002), Icelandic athlete

== See also ==
- Løve, a surname
- Love (disambiguation)
