= Johnny Love (footballer) =

English footballer

Personal information
- Full name: John Love
- Date of birth: 11 March 1937
- Place of birth: Eynsham, England
- Date of death: 19 November 2010 (aged 73)
- Place of death: Oxford, England
- Position: Winger

Youth career
- Eynsham
- Oxford City
- Wolverhampton Wanderers

Senior career*
Years	Team	Apps	(Gls)
1955–1963	Oxford United	279	(40)
–	Wellington Town		
- * Club domestic league appearances and goals

Johnny Love (11 March 1937 – 19 November 2010) was an English footballer who played for Oxford United and Wellington Town. Love represented England twice at youth level. During his spell at Oxford, he played 279 league games. Between 1955 and 1957, Love was called up to the National Service in the West Indies. Love played on the left-wing during his years at Headington United and Oxford United.
