= Love (given name) =

Love (Swedish pronunciation: [luːvɛ]) is the Swedish version of the French name Louis. It can also be a version of Lovisa, and can thus be used both for men and women, although it is more common with men.

The name is uncommon among adults; there are fewer than 200 men older than 30 in Sweden with the name, but several hundreds from every cohort born in the 1990s. As on 31 December 2009, there were in total 6,058 men in Sweden with the name Love/Lowe, of which 2,953 had it as first name, and the rest as middle name. There were also 531 women with the name, of which 128 had it as their given name.

In 2003, 344 boys got the name, and of those, 182 got it as given name. The same year, 24 girls got the name, of which 6 got it as given name.

The name day in Sweden is 2 October (1986-1992: 3 December; 1993-2000: 26 November).

Persons with the name include:

- Love Ablish (born 1982), Indian first-class cricketer
- Love Arrhov (born 2008), Swedish footballer
- Carl Jonas Love Almqvist (1793–1866), Swedish author and composer
- Love Antell (born 1980), Swedish-Finnish singer and artist
- Love Gantt (1875–1935), American physician
