= LøVë =

LøVë is the name of two releases by Aaron Carter:

- Love (Aaron Carter EP), 2017
- Love (Aaron Carter album), 2018
