= Wilton Love =

Australian medical practitioner (1861–1933)

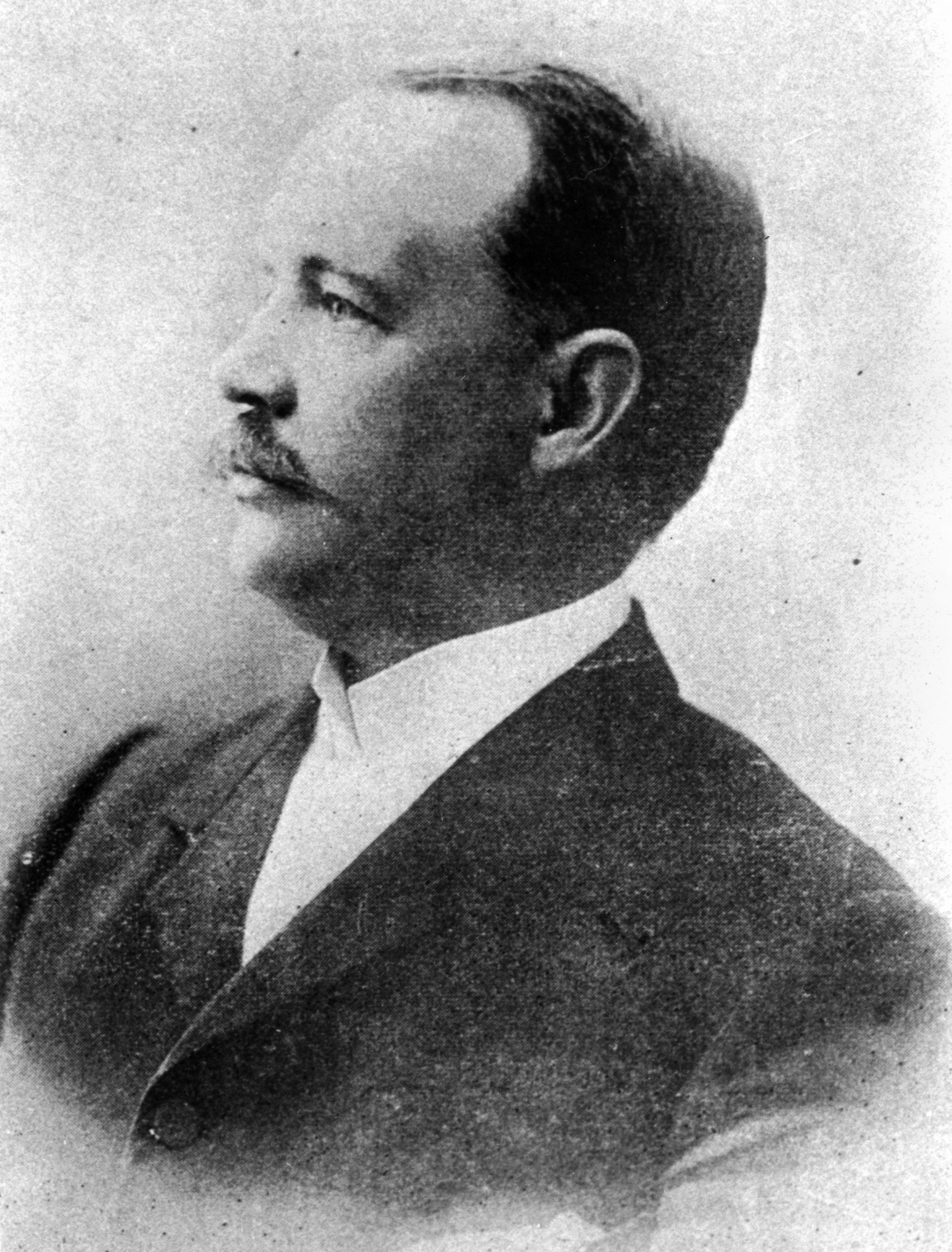
Dr Wilton Love, c. 1907

Dr. Wilton Wood Russell Love (1861–1933) was an Australian doctor and surgeon who pioneered the use of x-rays in medical practice in Australia. He served as President of the Queensland Medical Society and President of the Queensland branch of the British Medical Association. He was Secretary of the Central Board of Health. He served on the Senate of the University of Queensland for 6 years. He was also a fellow of the College of Surgeons of Australasia.

== Early life and education ==
Love was born in Hollymount, County Mayo, Ireland on 16 November 1861. His father was a Presbyterian minister, the Rev. James Love, and his mother, Mary (née Russell), was an organist. The family moved to Australia in 1892 when Love was one year of age.

Love attended Brisbane Grammar School from 1876 to 1879 where he won numerous awards, including the Queensland Exhibition. He attended the University of Edinburgh where he graduated in 1884 with a bachelor of medicine and a master's degree in surgery.

== Career ==
He worked as a house surgeon and physician at the Royal Infirmary of Edinburgh hospital from 1884 to 1886.

He returned to Brisbane where was admitted to practice in 1886. He and went on to become a renowned physician and surgeon.

Love helped to pioneer the use of x-rays in medical practice in Australia, being the first doctor in Queensland to use one. He was a consulting surgeon to the Queensland Children's Hospital, the Lady Lamington Hospital for the Diseases of Women, and the Lady Bowen Hospital. He also taught chemistry and pharmacy (for the Queensland College of Pharmacy) at the Brisbane School of Arts in Ann Street, Brisbane.

In 1896, he represented Queensland at the International Medical Congress in New Zealand. Love served as President of the Queensland branch of the British Medical Association and President of the Queensland Medical Society. He was Secretary of the Central Board of Health. In 1910, he was appointed to the Senate of the University of Queensland; on which he served from 1910 to 1916. In 1915, he was made an honorary major in the Australian Army Medical Corps Reserve.

Love was also a fellow of the College of Surgeons of Australasia.

== Personal life and death ==
Love married Lucy Davidson in 1888. She was the daughter of William M. D. Davidson, Surveyor-General of Queensland. She predeceased him in 1920.

Love died in Bulimba, Brisbane on 3 January 1933. He was 71. He was buried in Toowong Cemetery. Love was survived by two daughters and a son.
