= John Love (minister) =

Church of Scotland minister (1757–1825)

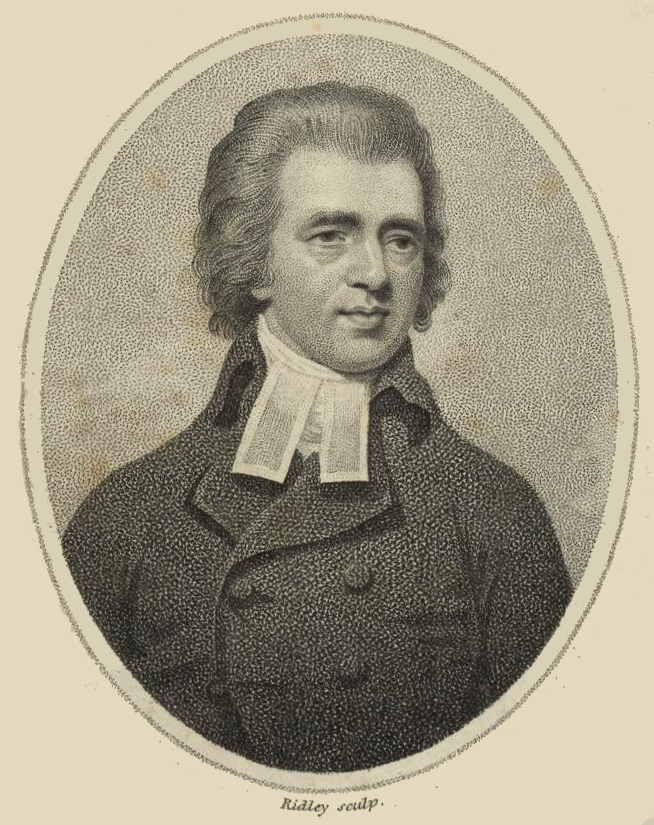
- Love in 1797
- Born: 4 June 1757; Paisley, Renfrewshire
- Died: December 17, 1825 (aged 68); Glasgow, Scotland
- Education: Paisley Grammar School
- Alma mater: University of Glasgow
- Known for: Early involvement with the London Missionary Society

John Love D.D. 4 June 1757 – 17 December 1825) was a Church of Scotland minister, known for his early involvement with the London Missionary Society.

== Life ==
Born at Paisley, Renfrewshire on 4 June 1757, he was educated at Paisley Grammar School, and then at Glasgow University, where he gained a bursary. He was licensed as a preacher of the church of Scotland by the presbytery of Paisley on 24 December 1778.

After being assistant successively at Rutherglen and Greenock, Love was ordained minister of the presbyterian congregation at Crispin Street, Spitalfields, London, on 22 August 1788. He became a significant figure among founders of the London Missionary Society in September 1795, having written a short letter which convened an early consultative meeting. He was involved in selecting and training missionaries, and was secretary to the society, while he remained in London.

In 1799 a chapel of ease was built in Clyde Street, Anderston, a suburb of Glasgow; Love was elected to the charge, and took up his duties in July 1800. He also became secretary to the Glasgow Missionary Society. He was a ponderous, solemn preacher, found impressive. In 1815 he was a candidate for the professorship of divinity in Aberdeen University, and in the following year the degree of D.D. was conferred upon him by the university and Marischal College.

John Love died at The Manse, Clyde Street, Glasgow, on 17 December 1825, aged 68. A missionary station in Kaffraria, now in Eastern Cape Province, South Africa, was established in 1840, and was named Lovedale after him.

== Selected works ==
Love's major works were:

- Nine Occasional Sermons, London, 1788.
- Fifteen Addresses to the People of Otaheite, and a Serious Call respecting a Mission to the River Indus, Glasgow, 1826.
- Discourses on Select Passages of Scripture, 2 vols. Glasgow, 1838.
- Letters of the late John Love, D.D., Glasgow, 1838 and 1840.
- Memorials, 2 vols., Glasgow, 1857–8.
