= Harry Love (cricketer) =

English cricketer

Personal information
- Full name: Harry Love
- Born: 30 May 1871; Hastings, Sussex, England
- Died: 26 March 1942 (aged 70); Ore, Sussex, England
- Batting: Right-handed
- Bowling: Right-arm slow-medium

Domestic team information
- Years: Team
- 1892–1894: Sussex

Career statistics
Competition	First-class
Matches	5
Runs scored	110
Batting average	12.22
100s/50s	–/–
Top score	30
Balls bowled	13
Wickets	–
Bowling average	–
5 wickets in innings	–
10 wickets in match	–
Best bowling	–
Catches/stumpings	3/–
- Source: Cricinfo, 26 November 2011

Harry Love (30 May 1871 – 26 March 1942) was an English cricketer. Love was a right-handed batsman who bowled right-arm slow-medium. He was born at Hastings, Sussex.

Love made his first-class debut for Sussex against Cambridge University in 1893. He made four further first-class appearances for the county, the last of which came against the Marylebone Cricket Club in 1894. In his five first-class matches, he had ten batting innings, scoring a total of 110 runs at an average of 12.22, with a high score of 33.

He died at Ore, Sussex on 26 March 1942.
