= John Love (general) =

United States Army officer 1820–1881

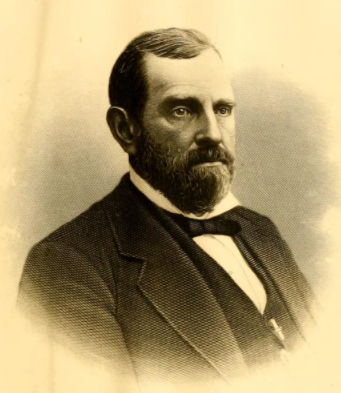
- Born: January 9, 1820; Culpeper County, Virginia, US
- Died: January 29, 1881 (aged 61); Indianapolis, Indiana, US
- Burial place: Crown Hill Cemetery and Arboretum; 39.820105°N 86.1720639°W
- Military career
- Allegiance: United States
- Branch: United States Army; Indiana Legion aka Indiana Militia; Union Army; Indiana Legion aka Indiana Militia
- Service years: 1841–1853; 1858–1861; 1861; 1861–1863
- Rank: First Lieutenant, Brevet Captain; Captain, Indiana Legion aka Indiana Militia; Major; Major General, Indiana Legion aka Indiana Militia
- Commands: Indiana Legion aka Indiana Militia
- Conflicts: Mexican–American War; American Civil War

John Love (January 9, 1820 – January 29, 1881) was a United States Army officer during and after the Mexican-American War, a railroad contractor, an officer in the Union Army during the American Civil War and a major general in the Indiana Legion, also referred to as the Indiana militia or home guard or state defense force, during the American Civil War. After resigning on January 1, 1863, he was called back into service in July 1863 and commanded an Indiana militia force which pursued Confederate Brigadier General John Hunt Morgan's raiders in Indiana. On July 11, 1863, about 100 militia men held off Morgan's raiders at Vernon, Indiana, forcing them to withdraw when Love arrived with reinforcements arrived. After his service he was a real estate broker and representative of the Gatling Gun Company in Europe. In 1880, Congress appointed Love to be a manager of the National Home for Disabled Volunteer Soldiers.

== Early life and education ==
John Love was born in Culpeper County, Virginia on January 9, 1820 to the former Eliza Matilda Lee (1790-1875) and her husband Richard Hendley Love (1786-1832). His ancestors, William Love and his wife Judith had emigrated to Maryland in the 1630s. His great-great grandfather Samuel Love Sr. (1686-1772) had deeded his approximately 300 acres in Charles County, Maryland to his two eldest sons during the Revolutionary War and moved the rest of his family was then the Virginia frontier. Previously, the carpenter had been gaining social status in Maryland, achieving status as a vestryman and justice of the peace and even on the earliest Committee of Correspondence, but his eldest son had with his father's assistance purchased land in Loudoun County Virginia in 1769 and had begun his own social ascent as vestryman and justice of the peace, only to enlist in the Third Virginia Regiment as a sergeant for a two year enlistment, as would his younger half brother John (but as a private and for an initial three year term in the First Virginia Regiment, which led to promotions to after re-enlistment for the duration of the war. Meanwhile about 1774, two years after the death of greatgrandfather Samuel, the two younger Samuel Loves established a mill and farm at Buckland on what became the border of Prince William and Fauquier Counties long before this man was born. His great-grandfather had named the community after William Buckland, an English emigrant today best known as the architect and master carpenter behind Gunston Hall in Fairfax County. Not long after the Revolutionary War, the four sons of that middle Samuel Love (1720-1787) (at least two of whom had actively fought in the Patriot armies) owned about 12,000 acres in northern Virginia in what had once been the Northern Neck Proprietary. His grandfather was Samuel Love Jr.(1745-1800), whose brother, also John Love, represented that northern Virginia area for several years in the U.S. House of Representatives and the Virginia Senate before his wife died and he sold the decades-long family homestead and moved to Tennessee. Through his mother, a daughter of Ludwell Lee, this John Love was a third cousin of Robert E. Lee. Love had an elder brother Richard Love (1816-1855, who joined the U.S. Navy and died in Florida), and two sisters, one of whom married a Rev. Johnson and moved to South Carolina, and Cecelia Lee (Matilda) Love Armistead (1823-1853; whose widower husband Lewis Armistead, also a career U.S. Army officer, would resign his commission and rise to the rank of CSA Major General before dying at the Battle of Gettysburg in 1862). His father died in Leesburg, Virginia when this boy was 11 years old.

== Early military career ==
Love secured an appointment as a cadet at the United States Military Academy at West Point, New York from Tennessee on September 1, 1837. Upon graduation from the U.S. Military Academy on July 1, 1841, Love was appointed brevet second lieutenant in the First Regiment of Dragoons, re-designated the 4th Cavalry Regiment (United States) in 1861, now the 1st Cavalry Regiment (United States). He was appointed second lieutenant in the 1st Regiment of Dragoons on February 21, 1842.

Love had duty at the Cavalry School for Practice at Carlisle, Pennsylvania, 1841–1842. Love was on frontier duty at Fort Gibson, in the Indian Territory, 1842, Fort Scott, Kansas,1842–1843, Fort Leavenworth, Kansas, 1843–1844, in Pawnee country (Nebraska) during part of 1844–1845. He was with Stephen W. Kearny's expedition to South Pass Wyoming and back to Fort Leavenworth in 99 days in 1845.

Love was promoted to first lieutenant, 1st Regiment of Dragoons, on June 30, 1846. Love was on recruiting service, 1845–1847 and again on frontier duty at Fort Leavenworth in 1847.

== Mexican-American War ==
Love's commanding officer, Stephen W. Kearny, was promoted to brigadier general in 1846 and placed in charge of the Army of the West (1846) during the Mexican–American War. After conquering New Mexico, Kearny took part of his force to California. He left three companies of the 1st Regiment of Dragoons, with volunteers, to garrison New Mexico under Colonel Sterling Price.

Near the end of the war, Price was promoted to brigadier general of volunteers by President James K. Polk. He led 300 men from his Army of the West at the Battle of Santa Cruz de Rosales on March 16, 1848, defeating a Mexican force three times his size. This was the last battle of the war, taking place days after the Treaty of Guadalupe Hidalgo had been ratified by the United States Congress on March 10. Although reprimanded by Secretary of War William L. Marcy and ordered to return with his army to New Mexico, Price was not punished.

Company B of the 1st Regiment of Dragoons had been trained as an artillery regiment after the beginning of the war. First Lieutenant John Love was in command of the artillery battalion at the Battle of Santa Cruz de Rosales. Love was appointed brevet captain for gallantry at the Battle of Santa Cruz de Rosales, Mexico, March 16, 1848.

== Marriage ==
On October 10, 1849, Love married Mary F. Smith, daughter of Oliver Hampton Smith, a lawyer who served as a United States representative (March 4, 1827 – March 3, 1829) and United States Senator (March 4, 1837, to March 3, 1843) from Indiana. An introduction to a collection of some of John Love's papers at the University of Michigan states that John and Mary Love had a daughter within one year of their marriage, but no other details are given.

== Assignments 1849–1853 ==
Love served as quartermaster of the 1st Regiment of Dragoons from March 12, 1849, to December 1850. He was again on frontier duty at Fort Leavenworth in 1849. He was on garrison duty at Jefferson Barracks Military Post, St. Louis, Missouri, 1849–1851 and on recruiting service, 1851–1852. Love resigned from the Army on February 1, 1853. He and his wife moved to Indianapolis, Indiana.

== Civilian life ==
Love and his wife joined Christ Church (Episcopal) in Indianapolis. From 1853, he was a vestryman there. As well as being in the real estate business in Indianapolis, Love had a large farm there. Love also was a railroad contractor from 1854 to 1858. He was a captain in the Indiana Legion (Indiana militia) from 1858 to 1861.

== American Civil War ==
At the start of the American Civil War, Love served as a major, brigade inspector and chief of staff for Brigadier General Thomas A. Morris with the Indiana volunteers in the Western Virginia campaign. He was with Morris during skirmishing starting July 7, 1861 at Laurel Hill, from which the Confederates withdrew on July 11 after the Union Army victory at the Battle of Rich Mountain. Then, he was engaged at the Battle of Corrick's Ford where Union forces killed Confederate Brigadier General Robert S. Garnett and routed the Confederate force. According to Eicher, Love was mustered out of the Union Army on August 1, 1861.

Thereafter, he was commander of a camp of instruction for Indiana volunteers at Indianapolis, Indiana from August 1, 1861, to September 10, 1861. Eicher states that Love was on recruiting service in 1861–1862 and was a major general in the Indiana militia from September 27, 1862. Cullum shows Love as a major general in the Indiana Legion, referred to as the Indiana's home guard or Indiana militia or Indiana state defense force of the period from September 10, 1861. Cullum shows Love as in command of a division in defense of Cincinnati, Ohio from September 1862 until his resignation on January 1, 1863. Republican Governor of Indiana Oliver P. Morton had asked Love, as a War Democrat, to help him with his administration.

During Confederate Brigadier General John Hunt Morgan's raid north of the Ohio River in Indiana and Ohio in July 1863, Governor Morton called Love back into service with the Indiana Legion and called out the militia to defend against Morgan's raiders. Union Army Major General Orlando B. Willcox was in command of the District of Indiana and Michigan. His commanding officer, Department of the Ohio commander, Major General Ambrose Burnside, ordered Willcox to defend Indianapolis and command all state troops raised in Indiana for defense against the raid.

In an article written after the war, Willcox stated that after the Indiana Legion levies were called up by the governor, he ordered them to secure three great junctions of the Ohio and Mississippi Railroad in Indiana. He noted that

Seymour was the most central, and lay directly on the road to Cincinnati and Indianapolis from Louisville; and to Seymour a brigade was assembled from the center of the state, with [Major General] John Love, a skillful old army officer, to command it, with instructions to have an eye to Vernon likewise.

On July 11, 1863, Morgan's men approached Vernon, Indiana after sending parties toward Mitchell, Salem and Seymour. A detachment of Indiana militia and a small number of new U.S. volunteer troops sent by Willcox from Michigan held Vernon and, Love having discerned Morgan's next target, sent Colonel C. V. DeLand, a couple of artillery pieces and two Indiana militia regiments to Vernon. Love quickly followed with the rest of his militia force, which resulted in more than 1,000 Union defenders at Vernon when Morgan's main force arrived about 4:00 p.m. Morgan sent two flags of truce demanding the Union force surrender to him. Love defied the demand and in turn demanded that Morgan surrender. Realizing he could not afford to stay and fight the large Union force at Vernon, he withdrew. Morgan had lost valuable time with this delay and his pickets and rear guard were captured by Love's infantry as his raiders moved on.

== Later life ==
Starting in 1863, Love was a real estate broker at Indianapolis, Indiana. Love also began his connection with the Gatling Gun Company before the end of the American Civil War. After Richard J. Gatling set up his factory in Indianapolis in 1862, Love bought stock in the company, and also represented the company as it presented the gun for sale to the United States, China, Japan, Turkey, and throughout Europe in 1867. Love, though he began selling his stock in 1873, continued to represent the company a year later.

In 1880, Love was appointed by Congress to be a manager of the National Home for Disabled Volunteer Soldiers.

Love was a Mason and master of Ancient Landmarks lodge of Indianapolis for several years as well as a charter member of the Scottish Rite. The "Franklin Democrat" obituary for John Love, February 4, 1881, states that he was a member of the State House Commission at the time of his death.

== Death and legacy ==
John Love died of heart disease on January 29, 1881, at Indianapolis, Indiana. He is buried at Crown Hill National Cemetery.

== See also ==
Indiana National Guard#History
