= David Love (geologist) =

- Born: 17 April 1913; Riverton
- Died: 23 August 2002 (aged 89); Casper
- Alma mater: University of Wyoming; Yale University
- Academic career
- Fields: Geology
- Institutions: United States Geological Survey

John David Love (17 April 1913 – 23 August 2002) was an American field geologist and specialist in Rocky Mountain geology who worked for the United States Geological Survey (USGS) from 1942 to 1987. He was only the second person in American history to complete two separate geologic maps of an entire region as the senior author (Wyoming 1955 and Wyoming 1985) and was the first winner of the Legendary Geoscientist award from the American Geological Institute.

== Early life ==
Love was born at his parents' ranch near Riverton, Wyoming. He earned his bachelor's and master's degrees from the University of Wyoming and received his Ph.D. in geology from Yale University in 1938.

== Career ==
Love worked for Shell Oil Company from 1938 to 1942 and opened the USGS field office at Laramie in 1943, where he worked until the office closed in 1987.

Love played a key role in the start of the uranium-mining industry in Wyoming by discovering uranium in 1951 near Pumpkin Buttes, about 25 miles northeast of Midwest, Wyoming.
