= Love, Cass County, Texas =

- Unincorporated community
- Location within Texas
- Coordinates: 32°58′14″N 94°36′32″W
- Country: United States
- State: Texas
- Counties: Cass
- Elevation: 344 ft (105 m)
- Time zone: UTC-6 (Central (CST))
  - Summer (DST): UTC-5 (CDT)
- GNIS feature ID: 1378615

Love is an unincorporated community in Cass County, Texas, United States.

Love is located 2.6 miles (4.2 km) southeast of Hughes Springs on County Road 2984.
