= Michael Wyckoff =

- Also known as: R!OT
- Born: Michael Everett Wyckoff; March 5, 1994 (age 32)
- Origin: Los Angeles, California, United States
- Genres: Film music; soundtrack; EDM; classical; pop; R&B
- Occupations: Composer; record producer
- Instruments: Piano; trumpet; synthesizer; ocarina
- Labels: Sony; Republic Records; Hundredup
- Website: www.michaelwyckoffmusic.com

Michael Everett Wyckoff (born March 5, 1994) is an American film composer, record producer, and pianist. He is also known by his stage name R!OT. Among his credits are Boneworks, Bonelab, Pitch Perfect 3, and Over the Moon.

== Life and career ==
Wyckoff was born and grew up in the Los Angeles community of Van Nuys. He began taking piano lessons at the age of 4. Wyckoff attended California State University Northridge for Film Scoring.

In 2012, Wyckoff started his R!OT project by launching the youtube channel "riotedm", and began uploading original music and remixes performed on the Novation Launchpad. His videos gained popularity, giving him over 300,000 subscribers as of 2020. In 2014, his unofficial remix of Animals by Martin Garrix went viral and gained over 75 million views across various online platforms.

In 2013, Wyckoff met Brandon Laatsch. Wyckoff scored various films for Laatsch, and in 2016 Laatsch formed the video game company "Stress Level Zero" alongside Alex Knoll. Wyckoff was brought on as their composer to write the soundtracks for Hover Junkers (2016), Duck Season (2017), Boneworks (2019), And Bonelab with Jonathan LaMarche. Boneworks received high sales and acclaim, becoming the highest selling VR game at that date.

In 2013, Wyckoff was introduced to Christina Grimmie through a mutual friend, Jonathan LaMarche, and joined her touring band; he contributed keyboards so that Christina, a known pianist, could focus on singing and interacting with the crowd. In 2014, his song with Miles Pinto, "Rinse It", was featured in the film Moms' Night Out. In 2015 he was asked by Toyota to create original music using only sounds recorded at their production facilities for their Gifony campaign. In 2016, Wyckoff produced the official remix of Fool's Gold by Aaron Carter, as well as Sit Still Look Pretty by Daya. The R!OT remix of Sit Still, Look Pretty was featured in the New York Times. R!OT was also asked to remix Keiynan Lonsdale's "Higher", Dirty South's "All of Us", and Jayceeoh's "Elevate".

In 2016, R!OT performed at Entertainment Weekly's Popfest. In 2017 Wyckoff produced official remixes for both Aaron Carter's Sooner Or Later on Sony Records and Christina Grimmie's Invisible on Republic records.

In 2017, Wyckoff was signed by Harvey Mason Jr. as a producer, and joined Mason's team in Korea to co-produce various Kpop tracks. Wyckoff, along with Mason and his team, wrote "Diamond" by EXO which peaked at no. 1 on billboard, was no 1. on iTunes in 51 countries and sold over 2 million physical copies, "Vroom Vroom" by EXO-CBX which peaked at no. 2 on billboard and no.1 on itunes in 36 countries, "Butterflies" by Red Velvet which peaked at no. 1 on billboard, and "Hands on Me" which was featured on the tv show Produce 101. He also contributed music to Pitch Perfect 3 as well as programmed the Launchpad light sequences for all of Anna Kendrick's Launchpad scenes in the film. Wyckoff also contributed music to the films All Rise, Valley Girl and Over The Moon.

In 2018, Wyckoff composed the score for the Brian Skiba film, Chokehold. In 2018 Wyckoff produced "New Heroes" by Ten with Jon Asher and Shawn Hook, which peaked on Billboard at no. 4, and "Honest" by Key with Jon Asher and Dylan Bernard, which peaked on Billboard at no. 9. Also In 2018, his Launchpad work as R!OT was featured in the documentary Pad Culture alongside other electronic artists Madeon, M4SONIC, Nev, Exige, and Kaskobi. In 2018 he released his collaboration with DMC world champion Yuto, "Inari", on Oyotodayo Records. Inari was featured in the Survios game "Electronauts".

In 2019, he scored the film Morok. His self titled track "R!OT" was featured in Season 1, episode 2 of Whiskey Cavalier. Also in 2019 his R!OT project was signed to Harvey Mason Jr.'s label Hundredup. His first EP under the label, "Homeless", featured Jake Barker and Paula DeAnda. In 2020 he co-scored the Bruce Willis film Hard Kill with Rhyan D'Errico and Jared Forman. He also produced the Tao single "Ice Cream" with Ryan Yoo and Fei Yu. He co-produced Christina Grimmie's posthumous single "Cry Wolf" with Marcus Grimmie and Jonathan LaMarche.

In 2022 he wrote the music for Bonelab.

== Discography ==
=== Production credits ===
Year	Song	Artist
2017	Diamond	EXO
2018	Honest	Key
2018	Butterflies	Red Velvet
2018	Vroom Vroom	EXO-CBX
2018	Hands On Me	Produce 101
2020	Ice Cream	Tao
2022	Rainbow Halo	Red Velvet

=== Film credits ===
Year	Title	Director	Studio(s)
2014	Moms' Night Out	The Erwin Brothers	Affirm Films
2017	Pitch Perfect 3	Trish Sie	Universal Pictures
2017	Chokehold	Brian Skiba	Filmpool
2018	All Rise	Anthony Mandler	Entertainment Studios
2020	Morok	Daria Nazarova	
2020	Over The Moon	Glen Keane	Netflix
2020	Valley Girl	Rachel Lee Goldenberg	Lionsgate Films
2020	Hard Kill	Matt Eskandari	Emmett/Furla Oasis

=== Television credits ===
Year	Title	Studio(s)	Notes
2018	Whiskey Cavalier	ABC	—N/a

=== Video games ===
Year	Title	Developer	Notes
2016	Hover Junkers	Stress Level Zero	Composer
2017	Duck Season	Stress Level Zero	Composer
2019	Electronauts	Survios	Licensed "Inari"
2019	Boneworks	Stress Level Zero	Composer
2021	Deemo II	Rayark	Composer
2022	Thymesia	OverBorder Studios	Composer
2022	Bonelab	Stress Level Zero	Composer

Selected R!OT Discography

- Fool's Gold (2016) – R!OT Remix
- Invisible (2017) – R!OT Remix
- Sit Still Look Pretty (2016) – R!OT Remix
- Sooner Or Later (2017) – R!OT Remix
- Wake Up to the Music (with Patrick John Lu) (2017)
- Inari (with Yuto) (2018)
- Sometimes Kinda of Love (with Jake Barker) (2019)
- Hopeless (with Jake Barker & Paula DeAnda) (2020)
- All Night in Brooklyn (with Jake Barker) (2020)
