= Freddie Wong =

American filmmaker (born 1985)

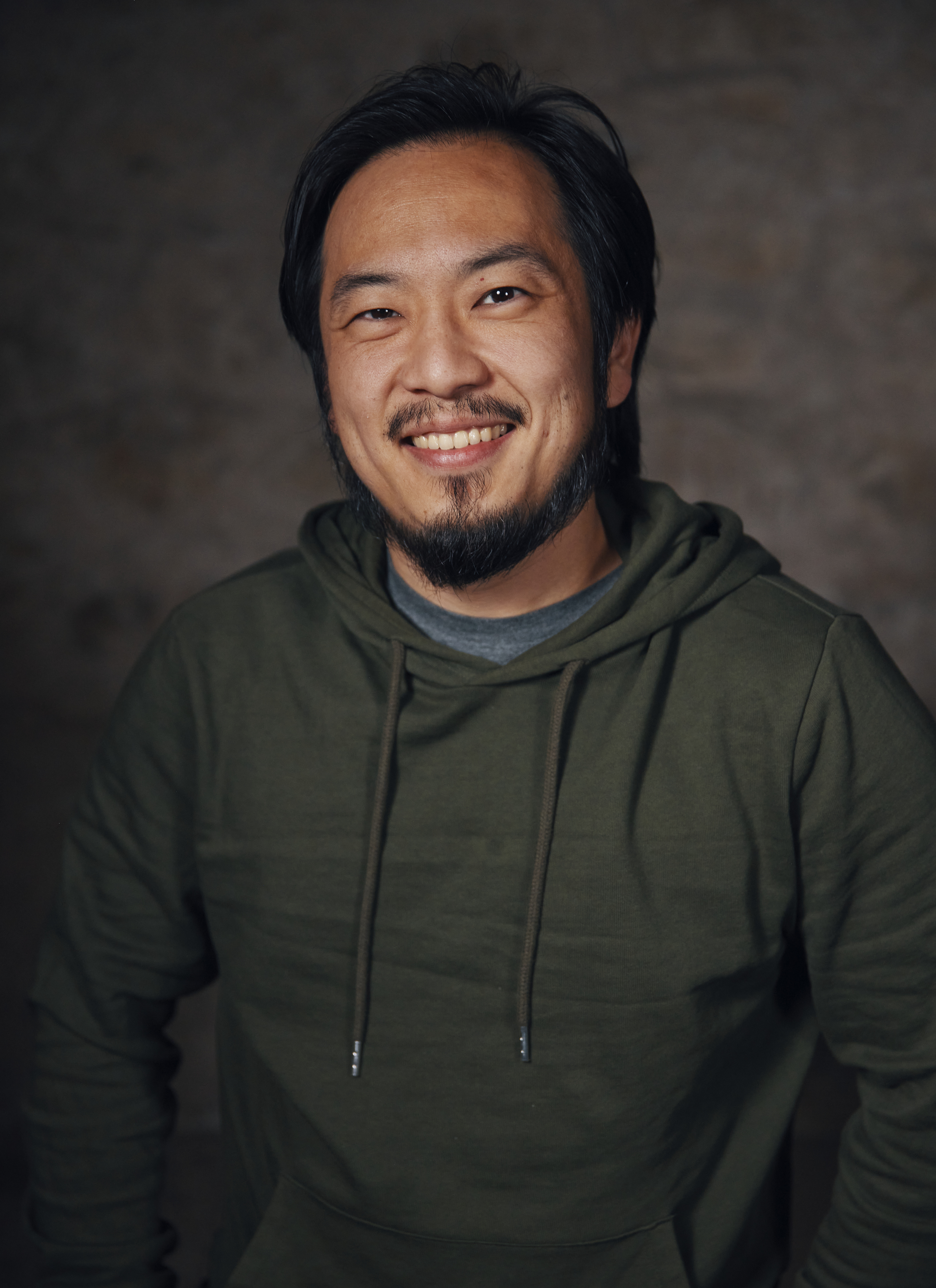
- Wong at South by Southwest 2024
- Born: September 13, 1985 (age 41); Seattle, Washington, U.S.
- Education: University of Southern California
- Occupations: Filmmaker; VFX artist; podcaster
- Years active: 2006–present
- Known for: Video Game High School
- Notable work: "RocketJump: The Show"
- Relatives: Jimmy Wong (brother); Corey Yuen (uncle)

Chinese name
- Traditional Chinese: 黃穀子
- Simplified Chinese: 黄谷子
- Jyutping: Wong4 Guk1Zi2
Transcriptions
Standard Mandarin
- Hanyu Pinyin: Huáng Gǔzi
Yue: Cantonese
- Jyutping: Wong4 Guk1Zi2

Freddie Wong (born September 13, 1985) is an American internet celebrity, filmmaker, VFX artist, podcaster, and competitive gamer. Wong has participated in at least three YouTube channels; with RocketJump, his production company's main channel, sporting over 9 million subscribers; BrandonJLa, a channel including behind the scenes videos and other content, which holds over 1.1 million subscribers; and Node, a gaming channel with over 3.2 million subscribers. He is also known for creating the web series Video Game High School.

== Early life ==
Wong was born and raised in Seattle, Washington. He graduated from Lakeside School in 2004 and later from the University of Southern California's School of Cinematic Arts. Wong owns and manages Overcrank Media, a Los Angeles–based media production company specializing in feature film and online video content, having produced an independent film titled Bear. Wong met his collaborator, Brandon Laatsch, in college.

== Career ==
=== 2006–2010: Competitive gaming, YouTube breakthrough ===
Wong launched a YouTube channel in 2006, initially uploading gameplay footage to wide success, and competed in the World Series of Video Games in Dallas in July 2007. He won first prize in the Guitar Hero 2 competition, playing the song "Less Talk More Rokk" by Freezepop. It was around this time that he began uploading videos to YouTube and finding popularity with his comedic or video game-related content.

During MTV's "Gamer's Week" celebration in November 2007, Freddie appeared as a guest on Total Request Live. Participating in the program with his newly formed band Hellanor Brozevelt, Wong was part of a country-wide search to find the best Rock Band ensemble. After receiving tutelage from well-known rockers Good Charlotte, Brozevelt performed at the Hard Rock Cafe in New York against Chicago-based Carrie Me Home.

In 2010, Wong helped Joe Penna, known as MysteryGuitarMan on YouTube, shoot a commercial for McDonald's, and assisted Wong Fu Productions in actions scenes of Agents of Secret Stuff. In 2011 Wong produced, co-directed, and acted in a TV commercial for Battlefield 3 at the request of Electronic Arts.

=== 2011–2017: RocketJump shorts and Video Game High School ===
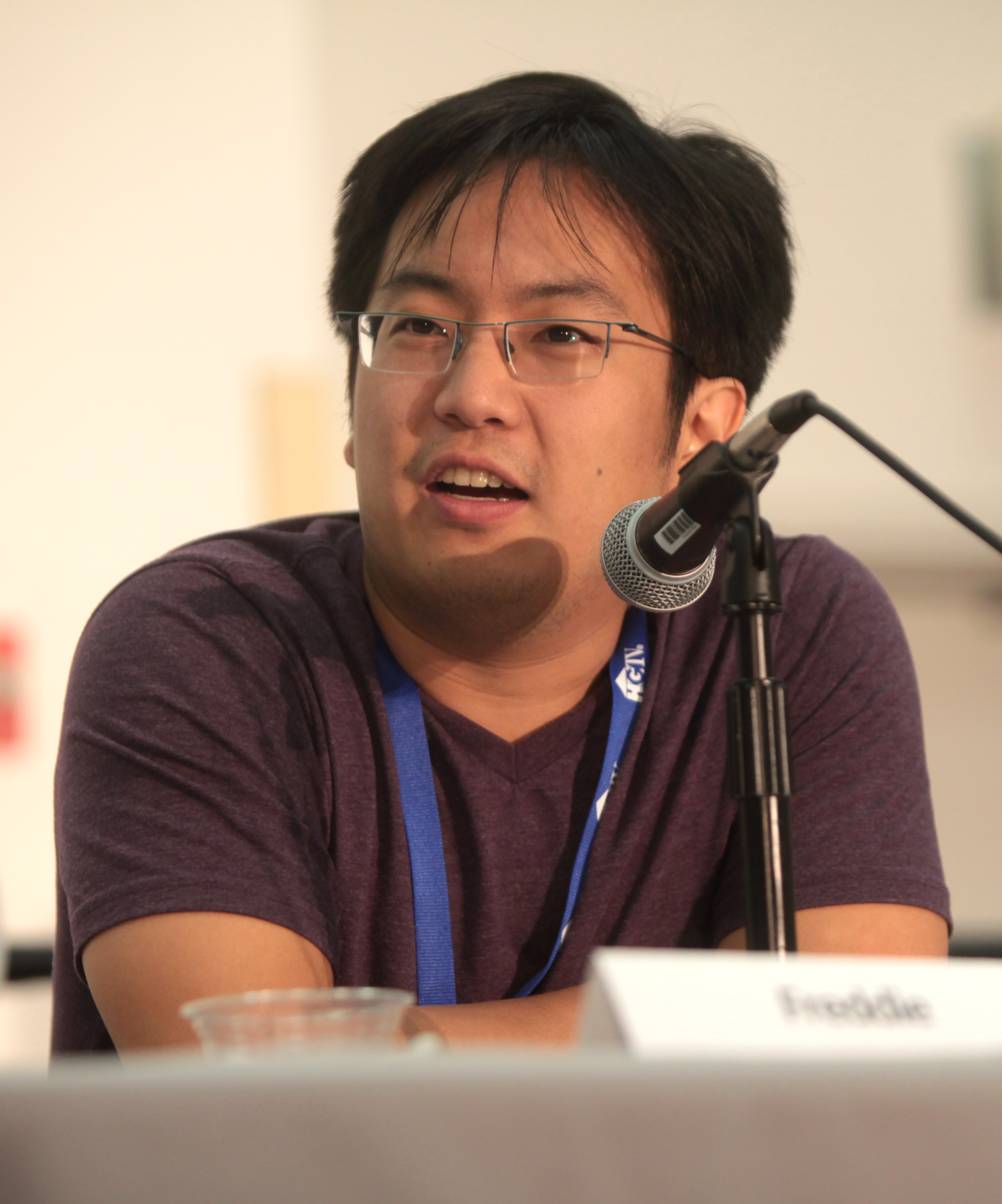
Wong at VidCon 2014

In 2011, along with his partners Matt Arnold and Desmond "Dez" Dolly, Wong formed the production company RocketJump. They began work on the web series Video Game High School, which began releasing episodes on May 11, 2012, and achieved over 100 million views across various online platforms. The series was based on a concept by Will Campos and Chris Pappavaselio. The team was able to raise funding for the series through Kickstarter, where they set a funding goal for $75,000 ($107,341 in 2025) to be raised in a 30-day period. That amount was quickly pledged in less than 24 hours and continued to climb from there. On October 22, 2011, pledging came to a close, with $273,725 ($391,759 in 2025) raised for the project from 5,661 backers. The series ran for three seasons, with the final season having a crowd funded budget of over $2.4 million ($3.26 million in 2025). The final episode of the series was released November 17, 2014, on the RocketJump website and YouTube.

Wong's videos would sometimes feature celebrity cameos, with Jimmy Kimmel in a bathroom tie battle, Andy Whitfield appearing in a Time Crisis tribute video, Kevin Pollak appearing in a Hypnotism stunt, Shenae Grimes in a romantic gun action scene, Ray William Johnson in a troll infestation video, Eliza Dushku appearing in an action scene, Jon Favreau featuring in his video based on Cowboys & Aliens, the glam metal band Steel Panther appearing in his video based on the Crossfire board game, and Smosh appearing in his video "Huge Guns (with Smosh)".

In late 2013, Wong's channel, freddiew was renamed to "Rocketjump", and freddiew2 was renamed to "BrandonJLa". Brandon Laatsch also announced that he and Wong would no longer work together on projects, and any short videos or "shorts" would be posted on either NODE (a gaming channel run by Laatsch and Corridor Digital's Niko Pueringer and Sam Gorski) or BrandonJLa. This was done because they wanted to work on separate projects, as Wong was busy with Video Game High School, and Brandon started working on a VR engine and game Boneworks. In both 2014 and 2015, Wong along with Matt Arnold won YouTube Streamy Awards for Video Game High School in the "Directing" category.

In 2017, Wong announced that RocketJump would be pivoting away from regular shorts, in favor of other projects. RocketJump stopped uploading videos altogether in 2018, after the second season of Anime Crimes Division.

=== Since 2017: Podcasting and feature film ===
From April 2017 to October 2021, Wong co-hosted the podcast Story Break on the Maximum Fun network. As described on the RocketJump website, the show features "[co-hosts] Will Campos, Matt Arnold, and Freddie Wong sit[ting] down in the RocketJump writer's room and attempt[ing] to 'break' a story for a ridiculous concept, property, or idea that [they] in NO way have any rights to." The podcast concluded in 2021, both due to the hosts feeling creatively satisfied with the show and to allow them more time to work on upcoming projects.

Since January 2019, Wong has been a collaborator on a Dungeons & Dragons actual play podcast called Dungeons & Daddies, along with Will Campos, Anthony Burch, Matt Arnold, and Beth May. The podcast is about four dads from Earth that are transported to the Forgotten Realms (one of the official settings for Dungeons and Dragons Fifth Edition) and go on a quest to search for their lost sons. Wong edits the show and is one of the four players, with Burch as the Dungeon Master for the first two seasons.

On October 21, 2021, RocketJump revealed on Facebook that they were beginning work on their first feature film. Shooting took place in late 2021 in Southern California and Utah. The film, We're All Gonna Die, premiered at South by Southwest in March 2024. Wong co-wrote and co-directed the film with his Dungeons & Daddies co-star Matt Arnold.

In 2023, Wong appeared in Dimension 20's sidequest Mentopolis, where he played the character Dan Fucks, the personification of sexual pleasure inside the mind of a scientist.

In September 2025, Wong announced he would return to creating videos on the RocketJump YouTube channel, and announced the production of a new feature action film, Nail House.

== Personal life ==
Wong is the older brother of actor and YouTuber Jimmy Wong, who co-starred in Video Game High School. His father is Chinese, from Guangzhou, and his mother is of Chinese and Mongol ancestry. His uncle is Corey Yuen, a film director and stunt choreographer.

== Filmography ==
Year	Title	Role	Other notes
2010	Bear	Producer	
2010	BDS9	Himself	
2011	Chuck	Freddie	TV series; guest appearance in "Chuck Versus the Hack Off"
2012–14	Video Game High School	Himself	Web series; also co-creator, co-director, story writer, executive producer
2013	MyMusic	DJ Elephant	TV series; episode: "Ghosts!!!"
2013	Bee and Puppycat	Tim Wizard	Web Series; episode: “Donut”
2013	Key & Peele	Ping	TV series; guest appearance in episode 3.07
2013	The Gauntlet	Himself	Web series; season 2 regular
2014	Rob Dyrdek's Fantasy Factory	Himself	TV series; episode: "Fully Uploaded"
2015	The Strongest Man	Jimmy Yoon	Film
2015	RocketJump: The Show	Himself	Also co-creator, co-director, writer, executive producer, editor
2016	Red vs. Blue		Guest writer and director of "The #1 Movie in the Galaxy: 3" episode
2017	Dimension 404		Director ("Impulse") and executive producer
2017–18	Anime Crimes Division		Director and co-creator
2019–present	Dungeons & Daddies	Glenn Close, Taylor Swift, Tony Collette, Blake Lively, Ashley Birch, and others	Actual play podcast; main role
2023	Dimension 20: Mentopolis	Dan Fucks	Actual play web series; 6 episodes
2024	We're All Gonna Die	Director	Film; co-director and co-writer
2026	’’Nail House’’	Director	Film; co-director and co-star
