= Jimmy Wong =

American actor and singer (born 1987)

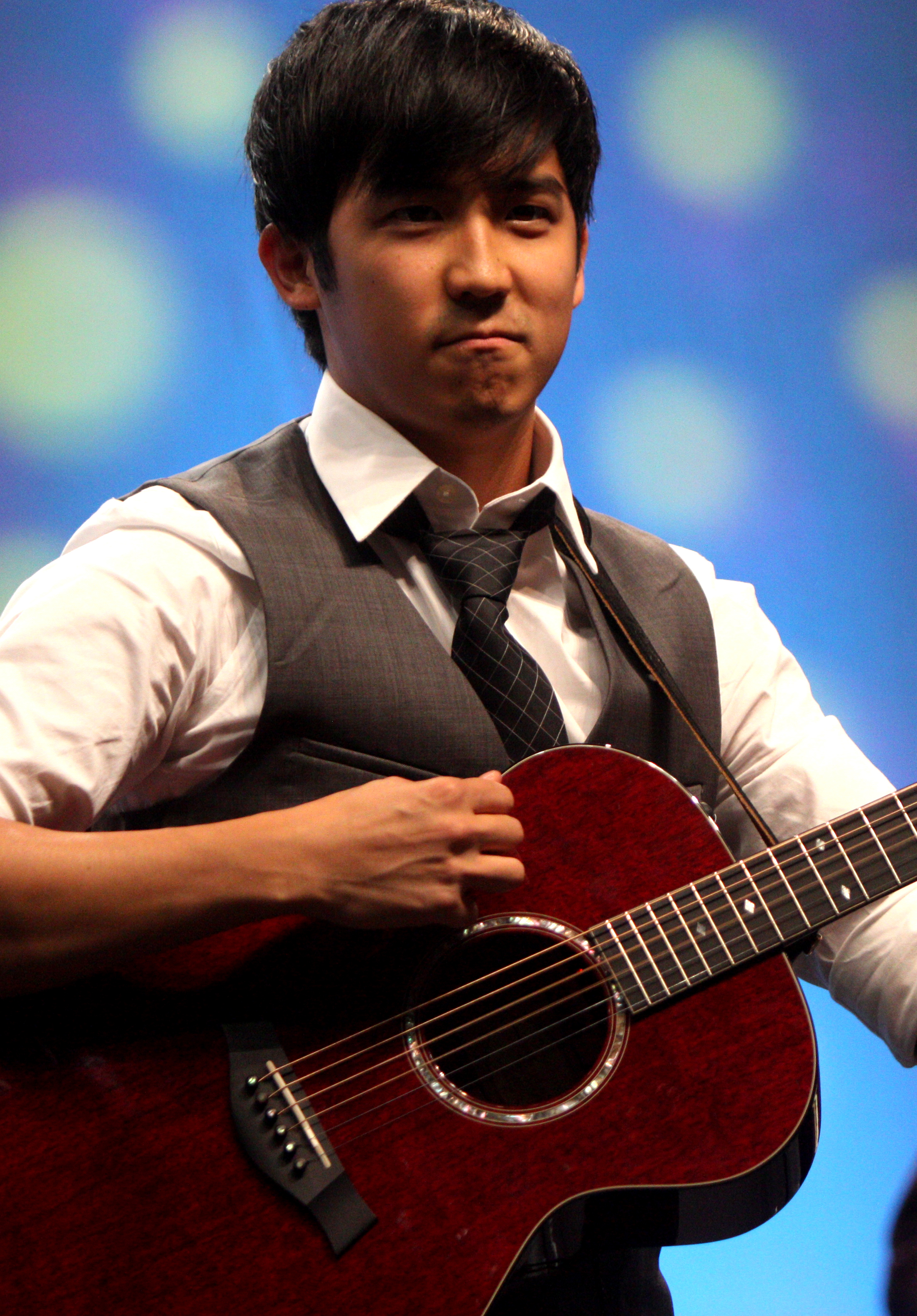
- Wong in 2012
- Born: James Franklin Wong; March 28, 1987 (age 39); Seattle, Washington, U.S.
- Education: Middlebury College
- Occupations: Actor; singer
- Years active: 2010–present
- Spouse: Rosanna Wang (m. 2021)
- Children: 1
- Relatives: Freddie Wong (brother); Corey Yuen (uncle)

James Franklin Wong (born March 28, 1987) is an American actor and singer. He is best known for being an avid player of Magic: The Gathering, specifically the Commander format. He hosts a podcast with co-hosts Josh Lee Kwai and Rachel Weeks called The Command Zone, where they discuss their experiences playing the Commander format. Also famous from his 2011 music video, "Ching Chong: Asians in the Library Song" and for his role as Ted in the web series Video Game High School. In 2017, he and YouTuber Meghan Camarena co-hosted the video game themed variety show Polaris Primetime, which was created as part of Disney's "D|XP" programming block on Disney XD. He was also the main antagonist of the show Parker Plays on Disney XD in season 2.

Wong has appeared in feature films such as John Dies at the End, The Circle, and the live-action version of Mulan. He has done voice acting in a Netflix film Wish Dragon.

== Early life ==
Wong grew up in Normandy Park, Washington. He graduated from Middlebury College in 2009, where he majored in theater and drama. After graduating, he moved to Los Angeles to become an actor.

== Career ==
Wong garnered national news coverage in March 2011, when he uploaded his music video, "Ching Chong: Asians in the Library Song" to YouTube. He created the video as a response to a UCLA student's vlog rant against Asian students using mobile phones in the UCLA library, one which MSNBC qualified as "offensive." NPR suggested that Wong's video response was one that "effectively turn[ed] the tables on the original rant," offering an alternative method of defense against cyberbullying. Wong later said in an MSNBC interview that while he was initially frustrated by the video rant, he realized that humor offered a better response, as he hoped to "put a positive spin on all of it." Furthermore, he stated, an eye for an eye approach would only encourage "this behavior to continue." "Ching Chong: Asians in the Library Song" went viral and was covered nationally by the American media.

That same year, he co-launched and co-hosted the YouTube cooking show Feast of Fiction with Ashley Adams.

Wong later portrayed Ted in the web series Video Game High School. He was also invited by Lionsgate and Google to create the web series District Voices. In 2014, Wong was ranked #73 on New Media Rockstars Top 100 Channels.

Wong played Ling in Disney's 2020 live action remake of the 1998 Mulan animated movie.

=== Gaming ===
Wong is an avid player of Magic: The Gathering, specifically the Commander format. He hosts a podcast with co-hosts Josh Lee Kwai and Rachel Weeks called The Command Zone, where they discuss their experiences playing the Commander format. Wong is referred to by his co-hosts as "Jimmy the Red" due to fact that he often plays red decks when playing commander. He has also been called upon by Wizards of the Coast to preview new sets at exhibitions and on their YouTube channel. In 2021, he appeared in the podcast Dungeons & Daddies, where he played a demonic human-paladin character named Jodie Foster.

Wong portrays himself in the hit 2022 physics based virtual reality game BONELAB.

== Personal life ==
His father is Chinese, from Canton, and his mother is of Chinese and Mongol ancestry. He is the younger brother of filmmaker Freddie Wong. Wong announced his engagement to his girlfriend, Rosanna Wang, in December of 2020. A few months later, the two married on February 28, 2021. The couple welcomed their first son, Mason, in February 2022.

== Partial filmography ==
Year	Title	Role	Notes
2011	"Ching Chong: Asians in the Library Song"	Composer and singer	YouTube music video
2012	John Dies at the End	Fred Chu	Feature film
2012–2013	MyMusic	Leader	Web series
2012–2014	Video Game High School	Ted Wong	Web series
2014	The Hunger Games: Mockingjay – District Voices	District 9 Voice	TV mini-series
2015	Dude Bro Party Massacre III	Sizzler	Feature film
2016	Edgar Allan Poe's Murder Mystery Dinner Party	Constable Jimmy	YouTube series, 4 episodes
2017	The Circle	Mitch	Feature film
2017	Polaris Primetime	Co-host	with Meghan Camarena, broadcast on Disney XD's "D|XP" block
2017–2018	Parker Plays	Recurring guest	TV series, 8 episodes
2020	Mulan	Ling	Feature film
2021	Wish Dragon	Din Song	Feature film

== Awards ==
- 2015: Won: International Academy of Web Television Awards – Best Ensemble Performance/Comedy, Video Game High School (shared with other cast members)
- 2014: Won: Streamy Awards – Best Action or Sci-Fi Series, Video Game High School (shared with cast and crew members)
- 2014: Won: Streamy Awards – Best Ensemble Cast, Video Game High School (shared with other cast members)
- 2017: Won: Guinness World Records - Most videogame characters identified in one minute
