= Hey Mama! (song) =

Single by Exo-CBX

from the album Hey Mama! (Korean) Girls (Japanese)
- Language: Korean; Japanese
- Released: October 31, 2016 (Korean); May 24, 2017 (Japanese)
- Recorded: 2016–2017
- Studio: In Grid (Seoul); SM Blue Cup (Seoul)
- Genre: K-pop; Funk; Nu-disco
- Length: 3:25
- Label: SM; Avex Trax; KT Music
- Composers: MRey; Hyuk Shin; DK; Davey Nate; Jayrah Gibson
- Lyricists: Jo Yoon-kyung (KR); Sara Sakurai (JP)
- Producers: Hyuk Shin; MRey

EXO-CBX singles chronology
| "Hey Mama!" (2016) | "Ka-Ching!" (2017) |

Music video
- "Hey Mama!" on YouTube

"Hey Mama" is the debut single by EXO-CBX, the first official sub-unit of the South Korean boy group EXO. It was released on October 31, 2016, by SM Entertainment as the title track of their debut extended play Hey Mama!. The Japanese version of the song was released on May 24, 2017, along with their Japanese debut EP Girls by Avex Trax.

== Background and release ==
"Hey Mama!" ("Mama" referring to an attractive woman) is described as a mixture of funk, disco, and pop. The lyrics talk about enjoying parties to make it a special day. It was officially released on October 31, 2016.

"Hey Mama!" was choreographed by Kyle Hanagami, who had previously choreographed for Girls' Generation, After School, Red Velvet, and Blackpink. Its music video garnered 2 million views on YouTube within 9 hours after being released.

== Music video ==
On October 25, 2016, a teaser for "Hey Mama!" music video was revealed by S.M. Entertainment. The music video was officially released on October 31, 2016.

The first part of the music video was Chen and Xiumin working in their tiny cubicles while Baekhyun is on the roof. He influenced the two to stop working and enjoy themselves. Then, they invaded a news room influencing more people to stop working. In the end, the members, along with some other working people are in the forest, camping, enjoying themselves. It also features backup dancers where they perform the choreography of the song with the trio in some scenes.

== Promotions ==
EXO-CBX performed "Hey Mama!" live for the first time at the promotional event for their debut EP Hey Mama! on October 31, 2016.

EXO-CBX made their debut performance of "Hey Mama!" on M Countdown on November 3, later on KBS's Music Bank and MBC's Show! Music Core.

On November 5, 2016, EXO-CBX performed "Hey Mama!" at You Hee-yeol's Sketchbook.

On November 18, 2016, the group performed the song at the OGN World Championship N-Pop Showcase.

On February 18, 2017, EXO-CBX performed "Hey Mama!" at the K-Drama Fest in Pyeongchang.

The group performed the Japanese version of "Hey Mama!" for the first time at the 2017 Girls Awards on May 3, 2017.

EXO-CBX performed "Hey Mama!" on Music Bank on May 19, 2017 in Jeonju in honor of FIFA U-20 World Cup.

On June 7, the group performed "Hey Mama!", the Japanese version on EXO-CBX "Colorful BoX" Free Showcase.

On August 26, 2017, EXO-CBX performed the Japanese version of "Hey Mama!" on a-nation concert in Japan.

== Reception ==
"Hey Mama!" ranked No.4 on Gaon Digital Chart, and No.7 on Billboard's US World Digital Songs.

== Charts ==
| Chart (2016) | Peak position |
Korean version
| South Korean Weekly singles (Gaon) | 4 |
| South Korean Monthly singles (Gaon) | 19 |
| US World Digital Songs (Billboard) | 7 |

== Sales ==
| Region | Sales |
Korean version
| South Korea (Gaon) | 285,728 |

== Accolades ==
=== Music programs ===
| Program | Date | Ref. |
|---|---|---|
| The Show | November 15, 2016 | |

== Release history ==
| Region | Date | Format | Label |
Korean version
| South Korea | October 31, 2016 | Digital download; streaming | SM; KT Music |
| Worldwide | October 31, 2016 | Digital download; streaming | SM; KT Music |
Japanese version
| Japan | May 24, 2017 | Digital download; streaming | Avex Trax |
| Worldwide | May 24, 2017 | Digital download; streaming | Avex Trax |

== Credits ==
Credits adapted from the EP's liner notes.

=== Studio ===
- SM Blue Cup Studio – recording, mixing
- In Grid Studio – recording
- doobdoob Studio – digital editing
- Sterling Sound – mastering

=== Personnel ===
- SM Entertainment – executive producer
- Lee Soo-man – producer
- Exo-CBX – vocals
- Jo Yoon-kyung – Korean lyrics
- Sara Sakurai – Japanese lyrics
- DK – composition
- Davey Nate – composition, background vocals
- Jayrah Gibson – composition, background vocals
- Hyuk Shin – producer, composition, arrangement
- MRey – producer, composition, arrangement
- Kye Bum-joo – vocal directing, background vocals
- Jung Eui-seok – recording, mixing
- Jeong Eun-kyung – recording
- Woo Min-jeong – recording assistant
- Jang Woo-young – digital editing
- Tom Coyne – mastering
