= Blooming Day =

Single by Exo-CBX

from the EP Blooming Days
- Language: Korean
- Released: April 10, 2018
- Recorded: 2018
- Studio: SM Booming System (Seoul); SM Big Shot Studio (Seoul); SM LVYIN Studio (Seoul); doobdoob Studio (Seoul); In Grid Studio (Seoul)
- Genre: K-pop
- Length: 3:19
- Label: SM; IRIVER
- Composers: Caroline Ailin; Jordan Croucher; Jenson Vaughan; Steve Manovski; Yoo Young-jin
- Lyricist: Hwang Yoo-bin

Exo-CBX Korean singles chronology
"Ka-Ching!" (2017)	"Blooming Day" (2018)	"Horololo" (2018)

Music video
- "Blooming Day" on YouTube

"Blooming Day" (Korean: 花요일; RR: Hwayoil) is a single by Exo-CBX. It was released on April 10, 2018 by SM Entertainment and distributed by IRIVER as the title track of their second Korean mini album Blooming Days.

== Background and release ==
"Blooming Day" is described as "a light and chic dance-pop track where the members' sweet vocal colors will be showcased. The lyrics talk about a sweet confession to a woman with heart fluttering emotions like spring".

"Blooming Day" was choreographed by Alexander Chung and Kasper, who previously choreographed Exo's "Ko Ko Bop" and other songs for the group.

On April 3, the title of the single "Blooming Day" was revealed along with the mini album's title Blooming Days and the date of its release. On April 8, the music video teaser of "Blooming Day" was released. On April 10, the song was officially released along with the mini album.

== Music video ==
"Blooming Day" official music video was released on April 10. The music video was directed by VM Project Architecture and features the members in a flower-decorated world along with scenes of the group and backup dancers dancing to the song's choreography. Choreography was done by LA-based Canadian choreographer Alexander Chung.

== Promotion ==
Exo-CBX first performed "Blooming Day" on April 10 on their broadcast "Exo-CBX's Blooming Day!" at the Yes24 Live Hall.

The group began performing "Blooming Day" on South Korean music shows from April 12 on Mnet's M Countdown.

== Charts ==
=== Weekly charts ===
Chart (2018)	Peak position
South Korea (Gaon)	20
South Korea (Kpop Hot 100)	2
US World Digital Song Sales (Billboard)	8

=== Monthly charts ===
Chart (2018)	Peak position
South Korea (Gaon)	35

== Accolades ==
Awards and Nominations
Year	Award	Category	Nominated work	Result
2018	Mnet Asian Music Awards	Mwave Global Fan Choice	Nominated	
2018	Mnet Asian Music Awards	Song of the Year	Nominated	
2019	Gaon Chart Music Awards	Song of the Year – April	Nominated	

Year-end lists
Critic/Publication	List	Rank	Ref.
Nación Rex	Top 10: The Major Music Videos of 2018	7	

== Release history ==
Region	Date	Format	Label
South Korea	April 10, 2018	CD, digital download, streaming	S.M. Entertainment, IRIVER
Worldwide	April 10, 2018	Digital download, streaming	S.M. Entertainment

== Credits ==
Credits adapted from the EP's liner notes.

=== Studio ===
- SM Booming System – recording, digital editing, engineered for mix
- SM Big Shot Studio – recording, digital editing
- SM LVYIN Studio – recording
- doobdoob Studio – recording, digital editing
- In Grid Studio – recording
- SM Blue Cup Studio – mixing
- 821 Sound – mastering

=== Personnel ===
- SM Entertainment – executive producer
- Lee Soo-man – producer
- Exo-CBX – vocals
- Hwang Yoo-bin – lyrics
- Caroline Ailin – composition
- Jordan Croucher – composition, background vocals
- Jenson Vaughan – composition, background vocals
- Steve Manovski – composition, arrangement
- Yoo Young-jin – composition, recording, digital editing, engineered for mix, music and sound supervisor
- Onestar – vocal directing, background vocals
- Lee Min-kyu – recording, digital editing
- Lee Ji-hong – recording
- Ahn Chang-kyu – recording
- Jeong Eun-kyung – recording
- Jang Woo-young – digital editing
- Jung Eui-seok – mixing
- Kwon Nam-woo – mastering
