= List of Video Game High School episodes =

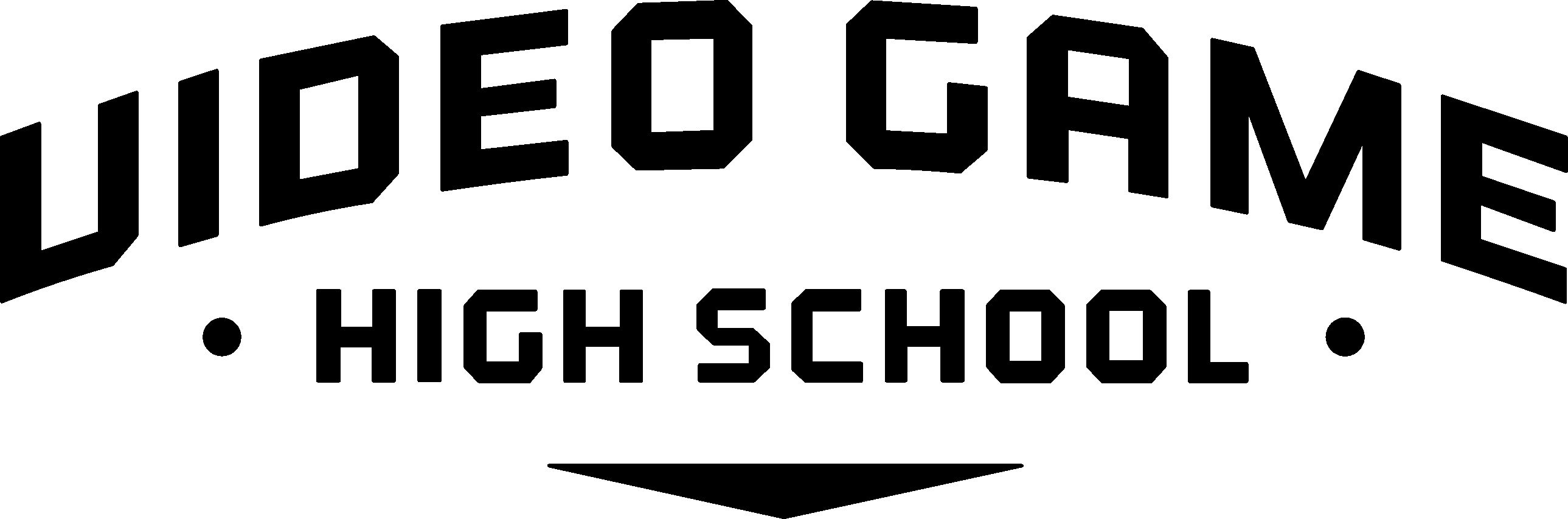

Video Game High School (often abbreviated VGHS) is an action comedy web series from Rocket Jump Studios. The first season has a movie format, broken into nine episodes, following Brian's acceptance into Video Game High School, and his first week there. He struggles to fit in and clashes with The Law, and gets expelled, but signs up for first-person shooter (FPS) tryouts, and gets accepted onto the Junior Varsity (JV) team. The second season has a television format, with story lines of every main character in each episode, and takes place over a longer time. The VGHS Varsity FPS team is disqualified from its season, and the JV team, including Jenny and Brian and coached by Jenny's mother, takes its place. Over the course of the season Jenny and Brian begin secretly dating, Jenny copes with having her mother back in her life, Brian tries to connect with his mother, Ted tries to fit in with the drifters, Ki finds her place at VGHS, and The Law picks himself up after losing so much.

== Series overview ==
Season	Episodes	Originally released		Length
Season	Episodes	First released	Last released	Length
1	9	May 11, 2012	July 5, 2012	10–22 minutes
2	6	July 26, 2013	August 31, 2013	30–44 minutes
3	6	October 13, 2014	December 15, 2014	37–66 minutes

== Episodes ==
=== Season 1 (2012) ===
Season 1 episodes were released once a week, from May 11 to July 5, 2012. Each episode was first released on the Rocket Jump website, and a week later the same episode was re-released on the YouTube channel "freddiew." This was done in an effort to attract more visitors to the studio's official website. People who pledged $20 or more to the project's Kickstarter received HD digital downloads of each episode as they came out, as well as an HD download of the complete season. Those who pledged $25 or more received an exclusive DVD of the series with limited edition cover art, signed by cast and crew, and those who pledged $30 or more received an exclusive Blu-ray version.

No.	Title	Length	Rocket Jump release date	YouTube release date	YouTube viewers (millions)
1	"Shot Heard Round the World"	11:54	May 11, 2012	May 17, 2012	12.611
High schooler Brian Doheny scores against world-famous FPS gamer The Law during a game. With the world watching in awe, Brian is accepted into the elite gaming school of his dreams: Video Game High School.
2	"Welcome to Me"	12:58	May 17, 2012	May 24, 2012	6.972
At VGHS, Brian befriends fellow freshman Ki Swan and resident assistant Ted Wong. In his first FPS match, Brian wins but causes his opponent to be expelled. The Law approaches Brian to offer advice in private, only to reveal his spiteful and arrogant side.
3	"When You Know the Pit..."	10:26	May 24, 2012	May 31, 2012	6.261
Brian garners a bad reputation after getting a fellow student expelled, but performs well in FPS class, earning himself an invitation to a party hosted by JV FPS team captain Jenny Matrix.
4	"Any Game in the House"	17:30	May 31, 2012	June 7, 2012	5.963
Brian and Jenny bond at her party, and The Law tries and fails to humiliate Brian. Jenny offers a spot on her team for an upcoming scrimmage to Brian, who learns she is dating The Law. Meanwhile, Drift King, the captain of VGHS' drift racing team, bullies Ted into playing against him, and Ted enters a fugue state while racing. Ki and Ted begin a relationship.
5	"And Then... The Law"	14:26	June 7, 2012	June 14, 2012	5.397
Finding out that students are betting on the outcome of the match, Brian attempts to score against The Law during scrimmage, only to cause JV to lose. As a result, he is left on the brink of expulsion.
6	"Carpe Diem"	15:48	June 14, 2012	June 21, 2012	5.201
VGHS dean Ernest Calhoun asks Brian to drop out to prevent further humiliation to the school, and a distraught Brian recklessly picks a fight with his schoolmate Games Dean. Jenny arrives in time to save him from expulsion and persuades him to fight to stay in his dream school. Drift King tells Ted that his frequent drifting-related visions are a sign of his latent racing talent, and implores him to try out for VGHS' racing team, the Drifters.
7	"Sign Up to Sign Out"	17:32	June 21, 2012	June 28, 2012	5.021
The Law and his followers prevent Brian from signing up for FPS team tryouts, setting off a massive fight. Brian manages to sign up, but is expelled for inciting a brawl, and leaves school after arguing with Jenny. Ted tries to convince his emotionally abusive father and rhythm gaming teacher Freddie that drift racing is his calling, only to be persuaded to apply for rhythm gaming tryouts. Ki tricks him into signing up for drift racing, and a furious Ted breaks up with her.
8	"Locked in the System"	15:09	June 28, 2012	July 5, 2012	4.588
Brian lands a job at an arcade, and Ted, Ki, and Jenny visit over the course of the episode. Ted tells Brian he should try out for the FPS team despite his expulsion. Ki makes peace with Ted, and they reaffirm their relationship. Jenny tells Brian she broke up with The Law, and apologizes for treating him harshly. Jenny and Brian reconcile, and the latter resolves to attend FPS tryouts.
9	"It's All About the Game"	21:49	July 5, 2012	July 12, 2012	5.377
On tryout day at VGHS, Brian convinces Calhoun to let him try out for the FPS team. During the match, Brian pulls off a near-total team-kill and wins the game for JV. His expulsion is rescinded and he earns a spot on JV. Despite not making Varsity, Jenny is content, and shares a kiss with Brian. Ted and Ki successfully get onto the drift racing and rhythm gaming teams respectively.

=== Season 2 (2013) ===
Season 2 was confirmed during the latter half of 2012 by several of the people who worked on the first season. The Kickstarter fundraiser for season 2 started January 11, 2013, and ended on February 11, 2013, with the project more than sufficiently funded. A trailer for season 2 was released July 11, 2013, announcing the release of the first episode on July 25, 2013, but episode 1 was delayed until the following day. Inspired by The Hobbit: An Unexpected Journey, released a couple months before the production of season 2, select scenes were shot at 48 frames per second, twice the frame rate used on YouTube. The high frame rate (HFR) episodes were usually released on Rocket Jump's website at the same time as YouTube.

No.	Title	Length	YouTube release date	HFR release date	YouTube viewers (millions)
10	"Welcome to Varsity"	30:56	July 26, 2013	July 26, 2013	6.200
Jenny's mother Mary Matrix, with whom she has a tense relationship, is hired as VGHS' new FPS coach. Jenny hopes to join Varsity, but Mary picks Brian instead, ruining Jenny and Brian's first date. The Law is tried and found guilty of aimbotting, despite claiming he was framed, banning Varsity from the FPS championships. However, due to a loophole, JV is allowed to take their place, and VGHS wins the match. The JV team is rebranded as Varsity, and Jenny and Brian agree to remain friends. Freddie forbids Ki from doing homework, leaving her desperate to learn. She writes an essay assignment for Ted, who almost passes it off as his own work, but he owns up to his mistakes. Ki fails rhythm gaming as a result of defying Freddie, but is allowed to join another team. Afterwards, The Law shows up and moves in with Brian and Ted.
11	"You Can't Stop a Sandwich"	34:45	August 2, 2013	August 2, 2013	4.369
The Law has moved in with Ted and Brian, and is being miserable to everyone in residence. Without a focus, Ki sits in with each of the teams at VGHS, and is not able try out for any of them. The head RA makes her the floor RA, instead of Ted, and she must deal with The Law problem. The Law agrees to keep Ted in his room, but remains miserable. Mary puts the FPS team on a healthy diet, and losing his scholarship, Brian is not able to eat. Calhoun gives Brian a janitor job, but the hunger gets Brian suspended from FPS practice. Ted steals soda from the faculty lounge for the drifting team, there the Duchess of Kart kisses him and steals the key. Brian and Ted confront the battle kart team, and win a battle kart game against them. Brian apologizes to the team, and Mary returns him to practice.
12	"Double XP Weekend"	32:17	August 9, 2013	August 9, 2013	4.266
Video Game High School is preparing for parent's day. Ki and Ted are nervous for Ki's father's visit, and Ted tries to learn a card game that Ki's father is good at, but only convinces himself that he is stupid. After Ki takes her father on a tour around campus, telling him all she has done at VGHS, he says he wants her to come back home. He is unimpressed by her boyfriend, but admits she is growing up and lets her stay. Jenny is asked to speak about her mother before she receives the "Parent of the Year" award, but cannot think of any nice moments with her, and she and Brian end up spending the night together when he comes over to help. Over brunch with the head of the national FPS league, Jenny gets mad at her mother for reinserting herself into her life, but Brian helps to change her mind. The Law plays a video game Ki wrote about the events at VGHS since she and Brian got there, and he realizes that he has become a pushover.
13	"Thirty Foot Range"	37:34	August 16, 2013	August 18, 2013	4.292
Jenny and Brian are having a secret relationship. When Brian is not able to disarm a bomb in practice, Mary wants to bench him in the next game, however Jenny convinces her to postpone her decision. Brian spends all day practicing, and at first lies to Jenny that he is good to play, but breaks down on their date, causing Brian to be benched until the last match. In the last match Brian is the last person to survive, and is able to disarm the bomb while being blinded by his cat that his mother sent him. Ki is being a perfect RA until Shane finds cat poop. She finds out Brian has a cat in the residence, who becomes her responsibility before she can tell Brian animals are against the rules. After the residence goes into chaos finding out that Ki is breaking a rule, she tosses the cat out of residence, causing Ki and Shane to chase the cat all over campus. Ted gets locked into a car racing game where he meets a glitching race. After spending the night in the game he learns he must have fun and lose in order to be let out.
14	"Some Like it Bot"	32:54	August 23, 2013	August 23, 2013	3.851
VGHS is celebrating L33tmas, a combination of all holidays. Faced with the threat of deactivation, ShotBot escapes the studio and comes to VGHS dressed as a human girl looking for a human story. There he befriends The Law as The Law is looking for evidence that Shane framed him for alleged cheating. The two are unable to intercept the evidence of Shane's plan, and The Law finds out ShotBot was using him before being tied up by Shane's goons. ShotBot returns to sacrifice himself in order to save The Law and the evidence from a dunk tank, however Shane's name is not recovered from the wet USB drive. Meanwhile Brian is running around the school helping out Calhoun, Jenny, Ki, and Ted, until he snaps. His friends, and even Calhoun, apologize for always thinking about themselves.
15	"Three Laps, Three Rounds, Three Words"	43:40	August 30, 2013	August 31, 2013	4.273
Brian says that he loves Jenny, a sentiment that Jenny does not immediately respond with. Jenny tells her mother that she and Brian are serious about dating, and that she feels her mother was never there for her. Mary initially decides to bench Jenny and Brian, but lets them, and The Law, play. VGHS wins the King of the Hill game, earning them a spot in playoffs. The Law signs a contract with another school, Jenny says she loves Brian, and Mary accepts the fact that they are dating. Ted feels that Brian is not always there for him, and that they are not best friends anymore. He sees that his fellow drifting students are gambling, which is against the rules, and decides to join them instead of watching Brian's FPS game. At first he loses, but recalling how people have been treating him the past semester, he decides to not be a pushover anymore, and wins a race against the Drift King. Ted moves out of Brian's room, possibly ending their friendship. Ki is feeling empty, with no purpose at VGHS. When a girl comes to battle her meek friend Wendell, Ki takes his place. During their battle game, which her parents wrote, Ki also remembers the past semester, and realizes her role is to help people, and decides to run for student body president against Shane with Wendell as her running mate.

=== Season 3 (2014) ===
A third season was hinted at during the fundraising for season 2. Writing began during the post-production of season 2, and a third season was confirmed following the credits in the final episode of season 2. Scripts were completed in mid January 2014, the fundraiser campaign ran from January 23 to February 24, this time on Indiegogo, and filming began in March 2014. It began releasing October 13, 2014. Season 3 will be the final season.

No.	Title	Length	YouTube release date	HFR release date	YouTube viewers (millions)
16	"OMGWTFPS!?"	40:14	October 13, 2014	October 21, 2014	4.359
We return to VGHS with the FPS playoff season in high gear and the school election intensifying. Brian and Ted are forced to embark on a magic quest in Deathstalker 2 in order to help Ki on the toughest day of the election yet: the Presidential Debate. Brian and Ted try to obtain a rare sword for the MMO Club to secure their votes, but fail when Brian accidentally picks up the sword, binding it to himself. This causes Brian and Ted to get into another fight, further straining their relationship. Ki loses the debate when she announces that she wants to set aside part of the school budget to modernize the unpopular Social Game Club's computers. Meanwhile, Jenny has to battle her archrival, Napalm team captain Ashley Barnstormer, on a different sort of battlefield: the unpredictable talk show OMGWTFPS!? After being asked a series of publicly humiliating questions, Jenny manages to wow the crowd with her opera singing skills. Back at the school, Ki finds that the social gamers, grateful for her standing up for them, have decided to join her campaign. Ted has his fellow drifters intimidate the MMO Club into voting for Ki. Meanwhile, it is revealed that Ashley and Shane are brothers and are both plotting VGHS' downfall.
17	"Nobody Cool Goes To Prom"	42:32	October 20, 2014	October 28, 2014	3.087
It's prom night at VGHS: Ki gets caught up in a mystery noir when Brian's cat Cheeto goes missing. At first she believes Shane is responsible, but pieces together to clues to find out that Wendell was trying to frame Shane for Cheeto's kidnapping. Hurt and betrayed, Ki fires Wendell from her campaign team. Brian has a night on the town with the FPS team, where they come across a "barcycle" and get drunk. Brian eventually comes to consider the FPS team better friends than Ted before they are picked up by the police. Jenny gets the flu and has a strange dream, where she has the chance of joining a pro gaming team at the cost of killing Brian. Despite wanting to go to Prom with Ki, Ted is forced to take Freddie's car to drive the drifters to a nude gaming arcade, where the drifters attempt to steal one of the arcade cabinets. While fleeing from the arcade owners, Ted appears to have an epiphany and wanders off into the night, all while Ki attempts to call him to find out where he is.
18	"A Map To Sex Town"	41:42	November 24, 2014	October 24, 2014	3.208
Law finds out that he's been fired from Napalm and replaced by a new Law, who breaks some of his fingers. Meanwhile, over the next three weeks, Ted is put into detention due to events of Prom Night, Ki's campaigning has her poll numbers steadily catching up to Shane, and Brian and FPS team steadily advance through the tournament up to the semifinal match against Napalm. When he is released, Ted finds out to his horror that the Tomowatchi he had been holding as leverage against the MMO Club has died. He covers up its death and lies to the MMO Club to get their votes. During the election, Ki cannot seem to surpass Shane's lead. In desperation, she secretly fills the ballot box with fake votes for herself. Ki barely wins the election, but as they celebrate, the MMO Club arrives and demands the return of the Tomowatchi, and Ted is forced to admit its death. Ki, shocked with Ted's dishonesty, admits that she stuffed the ballot box and withdraws from the election, allowing Shane to win. Jenny decides to join a pro FPS team after the tournament, and intends to tell Brian when she invites him to dinner after the Napalm match. However, Brian misunderstands and believes Jenny is inviting him over for sex and he begins to lose focus, which hampers his progress in Napalm match. Brian manages to regain his focus and nearly wins the match, but is stopped by the new Law. Ashley then tells Brian about how Jenny will be moving to Paris to join a pro team, and their subsequent argument puts Napalm in a position to win. Jenny has a chance to stop Napalm with a single sniper shot, but chokes under the pressure, allowing Napalm to win the match. Brian, angry about Jenny not telling him the truth, breaks up with her. That night, Ted arrives at Brian's door and tells him that Ki has left the school.
19	"Video Game Home School"	37:09	December 1, 2014	November 3, 2014	2.827
Ki returns to her family home, where her parents are curious why she's dropped out of school, but Ki is reluctant to tell them. Brian and Ted then arrive, having temporarily called off their feud to convince her to return to school. Jenny also arrives to bring Ki's belongings, creating an awkward situation for everybody involved. In order to solve their problems, Ki's parents decide to have them play Couple's Council, a board game designed to repair relationships. However, in the middle of the game, they receive news that Ted father, Freddie Wong, had died in a motorcycle accident. Ted at first tries to cover up his grief and maintains that Freddie was a great father, much to everybody's concern. Brian and Jenny kiss on the couch; this marks that they are back together. Ki finally breaks down and admits to her parents that she cheated in the school election, and that she was afraid they would hate her for it, but her parents insist that they will love her no matter what. Later that night, Ted sneaks out of the house, so Ki, Brian, and Jenny go out to look for him. They find him at a laundromat arcade playing Axe Legend just to hear Freddie's voice again. Ted then finally breaks down, accepting Freddie's death and the fact that his father was "an asshole".
20	"Being A Teen Is Hard, I Guess"	47:21	December 8, 2014	November 10, 2014	3.136
Five years ago, Ashley and Shane Barnstormer attempt to enroll in VGHS, but are rejected by Calhoun due to their age. When the brothers try to bribe him, Calhoun permanently bans them from the school. Angered, the Barnstormer brothers ask their mother to buy out the school, but she gives them the condition that they must bring Napalm's stock price up to $400 per share. Over the next five years, the Barnstormer brothers build up Napalm. While Ashley runs the business, Shane fakes his death and enrolls in VGHS undercover as Shane Pizza. He engineers the Law cheating scandal in order to bankrupt the Law's sponsor, Jock Juice, which is a direct competitor to Napalm. In the present, Brian, Ted, and Ki finally return to VGHS. While Brian and Ted have made amends and are now friends again, Ki is still having an existential crisis and becomes a nihilist, believing there is no point to life. Meanwhile, Jenny has become a social pariah due to her choking in the semifinals. She is still emotionally conflicted over the breakup, and her skill suffers as a result. Her mother assures her that Jenny is not the monster that she fears she is, and that the very fact that she cares about what Brian thinks of her makes her a good person. Meanwhile, Brian tries to figure out a way to mend his relationship with Jenny. He asks Calhoun for advice, and Calhoun bluntly tells him to talk to Jenny directly. Ted is quickly roped into a prank war between the Drifters and the Duchess and ends up getting into detention as a result. Ted finally realizes that he no longer enjoys the Drifters' childish antics, and after beating the Drift King in a race, leaves the Drifters for good. Ki initially ignores Wendell when he welcomes her back, and makes a game where you walk endlessly until you let go of the controls, and your character dies. Determined to find a point to the game, Wendell "plays" it for almost twenty four hours straight. Inspired by Wendell's determination, Ki secretly reprograms the game, making it more fun as a result and is overjoyed to see Wendell happy with the game. Finally, Jenny decides to talk to Brian about their relationship, and Brian tells her how since his mother is game addict and his father was never there for him, he lashed out at Jenny because he was afraid of being alone again. Relieved that Brian doesn't hate her, Jenny agrees to get back with him. Meanwhile, Ashley and Shane confront Calhoun and inform him that they have bought out the school, finally getting their revenge. They then announce to all of the students that VGHS will be torn down and turned into the Napalm Mega Mall.
21	"The N64"	1:06:27	December 15, 2014	November 25, 2014	3.074
With four days left until the demolition of VGHS, the school atmosphere is bleak. The students are all forced out of the dorms, and Calhoun leaves the school in shame. Ted signs up for a summer job at the Napalm Mega Mall, while Brian is forced to try to find another school to go to, but his options are limited since he missed the deadline for scholarships. Ki keeps trying to find ways to prevent or delay the school's demolition. She finally finds a way by playing to the brothers' egos. She convinces them that the best way to promote their next Napalm product is to hold a Napalm Bowl, pitting Napalm's own players against the VGHS team. The Barnstormers agree, but stipulate that match will be a 64 player game, so the VGHS team must find 32 players if they want to compete. Unfortunately, recruitment is unsuccessful, as nobody outside the FPS team has the will to go up against Napalm. Meanwhile, Napalm recruits the best pro players in the world, further demoralizing the school. With no team, Brian and Jenny attempt to forfeit when Calhoun returns to the school and joins their team, revealing he never graduated from VGHS and is still technically a student. He then gives a rousing speech to the rest of the students, encouraging them to at least go down swinging and play one last game. This finally rallies the other students to join. While training at first is unsuccessful, Jenny decides to put each of the players in roles that correspond to their favored games. Brian also recruits the Law, who is happy to join to get a chance at revenge. On the game day, VGHS finally faces off against Napalm. The fighting is brutal, with many players on both sides getting killed early. However, eventually, only Brian, Ted, Ki, and Jenny are left. They make their way to plant the bomb at the objective. Ted is killed by a sniper, Ki manages to throw Shane off a building to his death, Jenny shoots Ashley out of his plane, and Brian successfully plants the bomb, winning the game. Disappointed in her sons' failure, the mother of the Barnstormer brothers cancels the buyout and severely scolds them. Meanwhile, both the new and old Laws find out they have a lot in common and become friends. With the school saved, the students celebrate. Jenny is given another chance to join a pro FPS team, and she takes it with Brian's blessing. In the epilogue, Jenny is in France training with her new team, while Brian returns home to meet up with Ted and Ki in order to play Ki's new game.
