= Magic (Exo-CBX album) =

- Digital cover

Studio album by Exo-CBX
- Released: May 9, 2018
- Recorded: 2018
- Studio: In Grid (Seoul); SM Big Shot (Seoul); SM LVYIN (Seoul)
- Genre: J-pop; dance
- Length: 39:51
- Language: Japanese
- Label: Avex Trax
- Producer: Max Matsuura

Exo-CBX chronology
Blooming Days (2018)	Magic (2018)

Singles from Magic
- 1. "Horololo" Released: May 9, 2018

Magic is the first Japanese studio album by Exo-CBX, the sub-unit of the South Korean-Chinese boy group Exo. It was released on May 9, 2018 by Avex Trax and distributed by Avex Music Creative. The album contains eleven tracks, including the lead single "Horololo" and a solo track for each member.

The album debuted at the third spot of the Oricon Weekly Albums chart with 41,173 copies sold on its first week of release.

== Background and release ==
After announcing their first arena tour in January 2018, Magical Circus, it was revealed later in March 2018 that the group would also be releasing their first Japanese studio album on May 9. And on April 11, 2018, the details of the album were released stating that the album will be released in six versions; The CD and DVD or Blu-ray 'CBX' versions consist of the CD and a DVD with music videos for "Ka-CHING!" and "Horololo", an off-shot movie and live clips. There are also four versions with only the CD with full group, Chen, Baekhyun, and Xiumin covers. On the same day, it was also revealed that the album will include three solo tracks, one for each member. On April 20, Avex released an album teaser featuring snippets of the tracklist.

The music video for title track "Horololo" was released on April 24, prior to the release of the album. On May 9, 2018, the album was released.

== Live performance ==
Exo-CBX performed the tracks of the album in their first concert tour Magical Circus in Japan.

== Track listing ==
Magic track listing
No.	Title	Lyrics	Music	Arrangement	Length
1.	"CBX"	Sara Sakurai (T's Music)	Samuel "Samdell" Lundell; CR (Aiming music); Capitalist (Aiming music); Han Kyung-soo (Art Matic)	Aiming music	3:03
2.	"Ka-Ching!"	MEG.ME	Hanif Sabzevari (Hitmanic); Dennis DeKo Kordnejad (Hitmanic); Daniel Kim	Hitmanic	3:27
3.	"Horololo"	MEG.ME	Dennis DeKo Kordnejad (Hitmanic); Pontus PJ Ljung (Hitmanic); Hanif Sabzevari (Hitmanic); Daniel Kim	Hitmanic	3:12
4.	"Girl Problems"	Akira (Palm Drive)	Andreas Öberg; Daniel Caesar (Caesar & Loui); Ludwig Lindell (Caesar & Loui)	Caesar & Loui (The Kennel)	3:38
5.	"Shake" (Xiumin solo)	Junji Ishiwatari	Peter Nord; Kevin Borg	Peter Nord; Kevin Borg	3:39
6.	"Off the Wall"	Amon Hayashi (Digz Inc.)	Simon Janlöv; Andrew Choi	Simon Janlöv; Andrew Choi	3:14
7.	"Ringa Ringa Ring" (Baekhyun solo)	Junji Ishiwatari	Andy Love (Joombas); David Amber	David Amber	3:37
8.	"Gentleman"	Junji Ishiwatari	Samuel "SAMDELL" Lundell; CR (Aiming music); SB (Aiming music); Han Kyung-soo (Art Matic)	Aiming music	3:35
9.	"Watch Out" (Chen solo)	MEG.ME	Adam Royce; Bobby John Bisciglia	Adam Royce; Bobby John Bisciglia	3:39
10.	"Cry"	Natsumi Kobayashi	Kkannu; Kyung Da-som; merry	Kkannu; Kyung Da-som; merry	4:20
11.	"In This World"	Sara Sakurai (T's Music)	Ōmama Takashi; MUSOH; Cashmir; Bitcrusher	Ōmama Takashi	4:27
Total length:					39:51

=== DVD ===
1. "Ka-Ching!" and "Horololo" music videos
2. Off Shot Movie (※初回盤のみ収録)
3. Live Clip (※初回のみ収録)

== Charts ==
Chart (2018)	Peak position
Japan Hot Albums (Billboard Japan)	3
Japanese Albums (Oricon)	1

== Sales ==
Region	Sales
Japan (Oricon)	62,142+

== Release history ==
Region	Date	Format	Label	Ref
Japan	May 9, 2018	CD; DVD; Blu-ray	Avex Trax	
Various	May 9, 2018	Digital download; streaming	Avex Trax	
South Korea	May 22, 2018	Digital download; streaming	SM; iRiver	
