= Ka-Ching! (Exo-CBX song) =

Single by Exo-CBX

from the album Girls and Magic
- Released: May 24, 2017
- Recorded: 2017
- Studio: SM Big Shot (Seoul)
- Genre: J-pop
- Length: 3:26
- Label: Avex Trax
- Composers: Hanif Hitmanic Sabzevari; Dennis DeKo Kordnejad; Daniel Kim
- Lyricist: MEG.ME
- Producers: Hanif Hitmanic Sabzevari; Dennis DeKo Kordnejad; Daniel Kim

Exo-CBX singles chronology
"Hey Mama!" (2016)	"Ka-Ching!" (2017)	"Blooming Day" (2018)

Music video
- "Ka-CHING! (Short Ver.)" on YouTube

"Ka-Ching!" is the Japanese debut single by Exo-CBX, the first official sub-unit of the South Korean boy group Exo. It was officially released on May 24, 2017, by Avex Trax as the title track of their debut Japanese extended play Girls. The song was first revealed in the short version of the music video on May 1, 2017. "Ka-Ching!" was re-released as a b-side track in EXO-CBX's first Japanese studio album Magic on May 9, 2018.

== Music video ==
On May 1, 2017, a short music video of "Ka-Ching!" was released.

== Promotions ==
Exo-CBX performed "Ka-Ching!" for the first time at the 2017 Girls Awards on May 3, 2017.

On June 7, the group performed "Ka-Ching!" on Exo-CBX "Colorful BoX" Free Showcase.

On August 26, Exo-CBX performed "Ka-Ching!" on A-Nation concert in Japan.

Exo-CBX performed a Korean version of the song on Exo's concert Exo Planet 4 – The EℓyXiOn.
