= Blooming Days =

- Digital cover

EP by Exo-CBX
- Released: April 10, 2018
- Studios: SM Studios, Seoul, South Korea
- Genres: K-pop; R&B; Electropop
- Length: 22:32
- Language: Korean
- Labels: SM; iRiver
- Producer: Lee Soo-man

Exo-CBX chronology
Girls (2017)	Blooming Days (2018)	Magic (2018)

Singles from Blooming Days
- 1. "Blooming Day" Released: April 10, 2018

Blooming Days is the second Korean extended play and third overall by Exo-CBX, a sub-unit of South Korean boy band Exo. It was released on April 10, 2018, by SM Entertainment and distributed by IRIVER. It contains a total of seven songs including the title track "Blooming Day".

== Background ==
On March 8, SM Entertainment confirmed that Exo's sub-unit Exo-CBX, would be making their Korean comeback in April. And on March 26, it was confirmed that the boy group would be releasing their second extended play on April 10. From March 29 until March April 3, lyrics teasers for the comeback were released through the group's official accounts on Twitter and Instagram.

On April 3, the title of the mini album Blooming Days and its lead single "Blooming Day" were revealed along with the date of its release. On April 4, the track list of the mini-album was released, containing seven songs, including the title track "Blooming Day". On April 5, Chen's teaser for the track "Thursday" was released along with photo teaser of the member. On the same day, the mini-album details were released through the group's official website. On April 6, Baekhyun's teaser for the track "Vroom Vroom" was released along with photo teasers of the member. On April 7, Xiumin's teaser for the track "Playdate" was released, along with photo teasers of the member. On April 8, the music video teaser of "Blooming Day" was released. On April 10, the mini album was officially released along with the title track's "Blooming Day" music video.

== Promotion ==
EXO-CBX began a special relay live schedule starting on April 9, which lasted for seven days.

The group held a live broadcast on April 10 titled "EXO-CBX's Blooming Day!" at the Yes24 Live Hall, where they talked about the album and performed the title track "Blooming Day".

EXO-CBX held fan signing events on April 15 in Seoul at SMTOWN Coex Artium, on April 16 in Busan at BEXCO Convention Hall and in Daegu at Novotel Ambassador Daegu Champagne Hall, on April 19 in Gangnam at Ilchi Art Hall and on April 22 in Goyang at Starfield Goyang.

EXO-CBX began performing the lead single "Blooming Day" on South Korean music shows from April 12 on Mnet's M!Countdown.

== Singles ==
"Blooming Day" was released as the title track in conjunction with the EP on April 10. The song was described as "a light and chic dance-pop track where the members' sweet vocal colors will be showcased. The lyrics talk about a sweet confession to a woman with heart fluttering emotions like spring".

== Commercial performance ==
Blooming Days topped various domestic and global weekly charts including China's Xiami K-Pop chart. On April 19, 2018, it debuted at number one on the Gaon Album Chart.

== Track listing ==
Blooming Days track listing
No.	Title	Lyrics	Music	Arrangement	Length
1.	"Monday Blues"	Hwang Yoo-bin	Peter Wallevik (PhD); Daniel Davidsen (PhD); Mich Hansen; Maegan Cottone; Iain James	PhD; Cutfather	3:21
2.	"Blooming Day" (Korean: 花요일; RR: Hwayo-il)	Hwang Yoo-bin	Steve Manovski (Tileyard Music); Yoo Young-jin; Jenson David Aubrey Vaughan; Caroline Ailin; Jordan Croucher	Steve Manovski (Tileyard Music)	3:19
3.	"Sweet Dreams!" (Korean: 내일 만나; RR: Naeil Manna; lit. 'Wednesday's Meeting')	JQ (Makeumine Works); Hyun Ji-won (Makeumine Works)	Kaelyn Behr; Michael Jiminez; Shaylen Carroll; MZMC	Styalz Fuego	3:06
4.	"Thursday"	Kim Eana	Erik Lidbom; Andreas Öberg	Erik Lidbom	3:05
5.	"Vroom Vroom"	JQ (Makeumine Works); Park Ji-hee (Makeumine Works); Bae Sung-hyun (Makeumine Works)	Harvey Mason Jr.; Michael "R!OT" Wyckoff; Britt Burton; Patrick "J. Que" Smith; Dewain Whitmore Jr.	Harvey Mason Jr.; Michael "R!OT" Wyckoff	2:46
6.	"Playdate"	Kenzie	Andreas Öberg; Yoo Young-jin; Martin Kleveland; Ilanguaq Lumholt	Martin Kleveland	3:30
7.	"Lazy" (Korean: 휴일; RR: Hyu-il; lit. 'Sunday')	Park Seong-hee	Micah Powell; Yinette Mendez; MZMC	Micah Powell	3:25
Total length:					22:32

== Charts ==
=== Weekly charts ===
Chart (2018)	Peak position
French Digital Albums (SNEP)	30
Japanese Albums (Oricon)	10
Japan Hot Albums (Billboard Japan)	5
South Korean Albums (Gaon)	1
UK Download Albums (OCC)	40
US Independent Albums (Billboard)	33
US World Albums (Billboard)	2

=== Monthly charts ===
Chart (2018)	Peak position
South Korean Monthly Albums (Gaon)	1

=== Year-end charts ===
Chart (2018)	Position
South Korean Albums (Gaon)	9

== Sales and certifications ==
Region	Certification	Certified units/sales
China (Xiami)		307,506
Japan (Oricon)		193,513
South Korea (Gaon)	Platinum	534,567

== Accolades ==
Awards and Nominations
Year	Award	Category	Nominated work	Result
2019	Golden Disc Awards	Disk Bonsang	Nominated	
2019	Golden Disc Awards	Disk Daesang	Nominated	
2019	Gaon Chart Music Awards	Album of the Year – 2nd Quarter	Nominated	

== Release history ==
Region	Date	Format	Label
South Korea	April 10, 2018	CD	SM; iRiver
Various	April 10, 2018	Digital download; streaming	SM
