= Video Game High School =

American web series

- Also known as: VGHS
- Genre: Action comedy, science fiction
- Created by: Matthew Arnold; Freddie Wong; Will Campos; Brian Firenzi
- Written by: Matthew Arnold; Will Campos; Brian Firenzi
- Directed by: Matthew Arnold; Brandon Laatsch (Season 1); Freddie Wong
- Starring: Josh Blaylock; Johanna Braddy; Ellary Porterfield; Jimmy Wong; Brian Firenzi; Cynthia Watros; Nathan Kress
- Country of origin: United States
- Original language: English
- No. of seasons: 3
- No. of episodes: 21 (list of episodes)

Production
- Executive producers: Matthew Arnold; Brandon Laatsch; Freddie Wong; Reza Izad; Sam Maydew; Dan Weinstein
- Producer: Gary Bryman
- Production location: Greater Los Angeles
- Cinematography: Jon Salmon
- Editor: Desmond Dolly
- Running time: 9–66 minutes
- Production companies: RocketJump Studios, Collective Digital Studio

Original release
- Network: FreddieW
- Release: May 11, 2012 – November 17, 2014

Video Game High School (often abbreviated VGHS) is an American action comedy web series from RocketJump Studios. It was written by Matthew Arnold, Will Campos and Brian Firenzi and directed by Matthew Arnold, Brandon Laatsch, and Freddie Wong. RocketJump Studios describes the series as "a show about best friends, first loves, and landing that perfect head shot". The team at RocketJump chose to make a web series because they "strongly believe the foundations for the future of digitally distributed content will be laid by web series".

Since its release in 2012, the series has been viewed more than 150 million times on various online platforms, garnering a cult following. The internet personality Jschlatt hosted two watch parties of the series on his Twitch channel, further boosting the show's popularity.

== Premise ==
The series is set in the near future, when competitive gaming has become a popular sport and gamers can become famous. Video Game High School (VGHS) is a school with a curriculum that covers video games across multiple genres.

The show's protagonist, BrianD, gains entry to the school after unwittingly defeating "The Law", an international first-person shooter star, on live television. The show follows BrianD and the friends and enemies he makes at the school, playing on standard tropes of school dramas with a video game background.

The show uses live-action scenes with the characters to show action within the games. The games depicted are inventions of the show, with the most prominent being a first-person shooter named Field of Fire.

== Cast ==
Actor	Character	Season		
Actor	Character	1	2	3
Josh Blaylock	Brian Doheny	Main	Main	Main
Johanna Braddy	Jennifer Matthews (Jenny Matrix)	Main	Main	Main
Ellary Porterfield	Kimberly "Ki" Swan	Main	Main	Main
Jimmy Wong	Theodore "Ted" Wong	Main	Main	Main
Brian Firenzi	Lawrence "The Law" Pemberton	Main	Main	Main
Cynthia Watros	Mary Matthews (Mary Matrix)		Main	Main
Nathan Kress	New Law			Main (Note: Episodes 3–6 of season 3 only.)

=== Main ===
- Josh Blaylock as Brian Doheny (commonly referred to as BrianD), an FPS player and the main protagonist of the series.
- Johanna Braddy as Jennifer Matthews (commonly referred to as Jenny Matrix), sophomore Junior Varsity team captain.
- Ellary Porterfield as Kimberly Swan (commonly referred to as Ki Swan), a video game developer and fighting game specialist who goes to the school to learn more about players.
- Jimmy Wong as Theodore Wong (commonly referred to as Ted), Brian's best friend, Ki's boyfriend, and the son of Rhythm Game teacher Freddie Wong.
- Brian Firenzi as Lawrence Pemberton (commonly referred to as The Law), a popular gamer.
- Cynthia Watros as Mary Matrix (seasons 2–3), coach for the FPS Varsity team and Jenny's mother.
- Nathan Kress as New Law (season 3), who comes into play after The Law is kicked off of Napalm Energy's High School FPS team and is given The Law's I.P. and title.

=== Supporting ===
- Chase Williamson as Shane Barnstormer / Shane Pizza (Seasons 2 & 3), the head R.A. and eventual class president.
- Bryan Forrest as Ashley Barnstormer (Seasons 2 & 3), Shane's fraternal twin brother.
- Joey Scoma as Randall Merryweather (goes under the alias Jumpin' Jax), a dim-witted FPS team member.
- Benji Dolly as Games Dean, an FPS team member with a suave personality.
- Nicole Wyland as Moriarty, an FPS team member.
- Meghan Camarena as Rapwnzel, an FPS team member
- Rocky Collins as the Drift King (commonly referred to as D.K.), a senior student and the captain/monarch of the Drift Racing team.
- Joel Dauten as Scott Slanders, co-host of PwnZwn.
- Clinton Jones as ShotBot, robot co-host of PwnZwn.

- Will Campos as the voice of ShotBot

- Nat'han as the Tutor of NukeInc
- Zachary Levi as Ace (Season 1), teacher of FPS 101.
- Harley Morenstein as Dean Ernie Calhoun, a former VGHS student who values the heart of the game itself.
- Brennan Murray as Wendell (Seasons 2 & 3) (gamertag TacoBoy14), a dorky student and also close friend of Ki.
- Freddie Wong as a fictionalized version of himself and an ex-world famous rhythm game player now working at Video Game High School. He is also Ted's father.
- John Ennis as Kenneth Swan, Ki's father

=== Guests and cameos ===
- Matthew Arnold as Zoostcaster
- Cliff Bleszinski as TheJackrabbit
- Will Campos as Buddy Phelps
- Joanna Sotomura as The Duchess Of Kart
- Wesley Chan as K-Pop
- Arden Cho as Korean TV Host
- Maddy Rae Cooper as O'Doyle
- Desmond Dolly as Acid Reflux, Quad Student #2, and Goon 2
- Justine Ezarik as Bella
- Chris Hardwick as Newsanchor
- Tony Hawk as Tony Hawk
- John Hennigan as Crazy Napalm Suit
- Clinton Jones as Clint Lockwood
- Brandon Laatsch as Brandon
- Shira Lazar as Rosalie
- Stan Lee as Stan L33t
- Tara Macken as Ronin
- Joel McHale as The President of the United States
- Burnie Burns and Joel Heyman as board members
- Ruben Raul as Criptix (Season 2 & 3)
- Ashton Paudi as AshiX (Season 1 & 2)
- Ethan Newberry as Clutch
- Conan O'Brien as Newsanchor
- Kara Petersen as Freezerburn
- Noah as Cheeto the Cat
- Michael Rousselet as Alliterator
- Jon Salmon as Chip Trigger
- Ashton Pooley as Relief Coach (Season 2)
- Nathan Frost as Enemy Team Sniper (Season 1)
- Phillip Wang as Oldboy
- LeeAnna Vamp as Esme
- Maureen McCormick as Mrs. Barnstormer

== Production and release ==
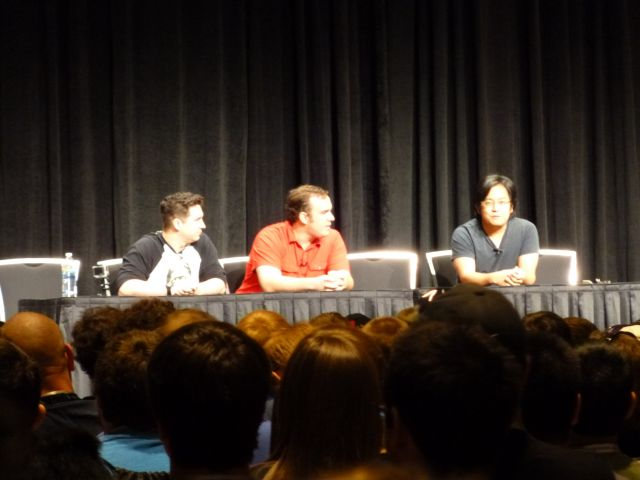
Desmond Dolly, Matt Arnold, and Freddie Wong discussVGHS Season 2 at a panel at RTX 2013

Video Game High School is co-created by Freddie Wong, Will Campos, Brian Firenzi and Matt Arnold. In addition to acting as showrunner, Arnold is also a writer, as are Campos and Firenzi (founder of 5secondfilms.com). The series is based on a concept by Campos and Chris Pappavaselio.

The team was able to fund the series through Kickstarter, where they set a funding goal for $75,000 to be raised in a 30-day period. That amount was quickly pledged in less than 24 hours and continued to climb from there. On October 22, 2011, pledging came to a close, with $273,725 raised for the project from 5,661 backers.

Principal photography began on October 25, and ended in late November. The final four days of shooting took place at the Eagle Mountain iron mine and Mojave Desert. Post-production started shortly after and ended in early 2012. The trailer for the series premiered on YouTube on May 11, 2012, on the "Freddiew" channel.

Later, the first season of the show was edited into a two-hour movie and released on DVD, Blu-ray, and online.

== Episodes ==
Season	Episodes	Length	Release date	
Season	Episodes	Length	Season premiere	Season finale
1	9	10–22 minutes	May 11, 2012	July 5, 2012
2	6	30–44 minutes	July 26, 2013	August 31, 2013
3	6	37–66 minutes	October 13, 2014	December 15, 2014

Season 1 episodes were released in May, June, and July 2012, first on the RocketJump website, and a week later on YouTube channel "freddiew". People who pledged to the project's fundraiser received HD digital downloads and DVDs. The Kickstarter fundraiser for season 2 ended in February 2013 with the project more than sufficiently funded. The second season was released in July and August 2013.

In July 2013, Freddie Wong said that a third season was being worked on, and filming began in March 2014. Season 3 episodes were being released once per week starting on October 13, or could be purchased for immediate viewing through Vimeo On Demand, which includes 4K HD, HD, and SD downloads of the episode(s) purchased. RocketJump announced on October 30 that season 3 would be the last of the series.

Netflix previously streamed all three seasons of the show, but only season 3 was available in 4K UHD, with most episodes doubled up to make individual 30-minute episodes.
