= Hey Mama! =

- Digital cover

EP by Exo-CBX
- Released: October 31, 2016
- Recorded: 2016
- Studio: In Grid (Seoul); MonoTree (Seoul); Prelude (Seoul); SM Blue Cup (Seoul); SM Yellow Tail (Seoul)
- Genre: EDM; R&B; K-pop
- Length: 17:17
- Language: Korean
- Label: SM; KT
- Producer: Lee Soo-man

Exo-CBX chronology
Hey Mama! (2016)	Girls (2017)

Singles from Hey Mama!
- 1. "Hey Mama!" Released: October 31, 2016

Hey Mama! is the debut extended play by Exo-CBX, the first official sub-unit of the South Korean-Chinese boy group Exo. It was released on October 31, 2016, by SM Entertainment under distribution by KT Music. The EP features five tracks in total with a variety of genres.

== Background and release ==
On October 24, 2016, SM Entertainment announced that Chen, Baekhyun and Xiumin would debut as Exo's first official sub-unit Exo-CBX with an extended play titled Hey Mama!. On October 25, a teaser for the music video of the title track "Hey Mama!" was revealed. On October 27, a highlight medley, featuring previews of the album's tracks, premiered on Apple Music's Beats 1. The album and the title track's music video were released on October 31. On November 7, 2016, SM Entertainment released the music video for the second single "The One" in their official YouTube account.

== Promotion ==
A promotional event for Hey Mama! was held at 8PM (KST) on October 31 on a special stage located at the east side of Samseong-dong COEX in Seoul. The event was live streamed on Exo's V App channel. Exo-CBX made their debut performance on M Countdown on November 3, and subsequently performed the song on Music Bank and Show! Music Core.

On November 5, 2016, Exo-CBX performed "Hey Mama!" at You Hee-yeol's Sketchbook. On November 18, 2016, the group performed "Hey Mama!", "The One", and "Cherish" at the OGN World Championship N-Pop Showcase. On February 18, 2017, Exo-CBX performed "Hey Mama!", and "The One" at the K-Drama Fest in Pyeongchang. The group performed the Japanese version of "Hey Mama!" as well as "The One" and "Cherish" at the 2017 Girls Awards on May 3, 2017. Exo-CBX performed "Hey Mama!" on Music Bank on May 19, 2017, in Jeonju in honor of FIFA U-20 World Cup. On August 26, 2017, Exo-CBX performed the Japanese version of "Hey Mama!", "Cherish", on a-nation concert in Japan.

== Critical reception ==
Hey Mama! debuted atop the Billboard World Albums Chart and the South Korean Gaon weekly album chart.

== Commercial performance ==
The album sold 275,000 copies in 2016. Hey Mama! became the highest selling album by a sub-unit in 2016 in Gaon Chart with 275,191 copies and in Hanteo with 202,281 copies sold.

== Track listing ==
Hey Mama! track listing
No.	Title	Lyrics	Music	Arrangement	Length
1.	"The One"	JQ (Makeumine Works); Bae Sung-hyun (Makeumine Works); Jang Yeo-jin (Makeumine Works); Seolim (Makeumine Works)	LDN Noise; Adrian McKinnon; Jeremy "Tay" Jasper	LDN Noise	3:29
2.	"Hey Mama!"	Jo Yoon-kyung	Hyuk Shin (Joombas); Marco "MRey" Reyes (Joombas); Jarah Lafayette Gibson; Davey Nate (Joombas); DK (Joombas)	Joombas	3:19
3.	"Rhythm After Summer"	Kenzie	Kenzie; Joseph "Joe Millionaire" Foster; Kameron "Grae" Alexander; MZMC; Otha "Vakseen" Davis III	Kenzie; Joseph "Joe Millionaire" Foster	3:30
4.	"Juliet"	Jung Joo-hee	Justin Reinstein (Mussashi); Lee Joo-hyoung (MonoTree)	Mussashi	3:35
5.	"Cherish"	100% Lyricism	David Anthony Eames	David Anthony Eames	3:20
Total length:					17:17

== Charts ==
=== Weekly charts ===
Chart (2016)	Peak position
South Korean Album (Gaon)	1
Japanese Albums (Oricon)	14
Japan Hot Albums (Billboard Japan)	15
US World Albums (Billboard)	1

=== Monthly charts ===
Chart (2016)	Peak position
South Korean Monthly Albums Chart (Gaon)	2

=== Year-end charts ===
Chart (2016)	Peak position
South Korean 2016 Yearly Album Chart (Gaon)	6
Chinese Albums (YinYueTai Vchart)	13

== Sales ==
Region	Sales
South Korea (Gaon)	296,514
Japan (Oricon)	11,445

== Accolades ==
=== Music program awards ===
Song	Program	Date
"Hey Mama!"	The Show (SBS)	November 15, 2016

== Release history ==
Region	Date	Format	Label
South Korea	October 31, 2016	CD	SM; KT Music
Various	October 31, 2016	Digital download; streaming	SM
