= Parker Plays =

US television program

- Created by: Parker Coppins
- Presented by: Parker Coppins
- Theme music composer: George Gabriel
- Composers: Dimitris Mann; Chris LaRue Horton; Jonathan Richmond; George Gabriel
- Country of origin: United States
- Original language: English
- No. of seasons: 2
- No. of episodes: 22

Production
- Executive producers: Kevin Williams; Clayton Cogswell
- Producer: Woody Tondorf
- Editors: Angela Juzswick; Omar Najam; Jeremy Sauder
- Production companies: Disney Digital Network; Digomind Productions

Original release
- Network: Disney XD
- Release: July 15, 2017 – November 19, 2018

Parker Plays is an American television series created and presented by Parker Coppins, known by his YouTube channel name ParkerGames, playing various video games. It premiered on July 15, 2017, as part of Disney XD's inaugural video-game themed programming block D|XP. The second season premiered on October 15, 2018, and ran for six episodes. After the show was unofficially canceled by Disney, Coppins created a YouTube show named Parker’s Place!, inspired by Parker Plays and produced by the same people, but only had four episodes.

== Background ==
Coppins was born in Eden, North Carolina to Mark and Darla Coppins. At age four, the Coppins family moved to Harlingen, Texas where his father took on a job as a pastor. He was homeschooled when he was younger, and then attended Calvary Christian School and Harlingen High School. He was inspired to go into acting by Dr. Liebert, a local physician, and participated in school and church plays. He attended an acting convention in Dallas when he was in high school where he met fellow aspiring actor and producer Jonny Lopes. At age 16, he and his mother moved to Los Angeles to pursue his acting career, where he had some supporting roles including a Lifetime movie. He played video games such as Runescape and got involved in filming his gaming with Lopes and posting it on YouTube. They were looking for a game to play together and settled on Minecraft. After eight months in LA, he moved back to Texas for about two years, and then returned to LA. He established his YouTube channel "ParkerGames" in 2013 and also contributed to the MineplexOfficial channel. In 2014, ParkerGames reached 200,000 subscribers, and as of May 2019, his channel had over 536,000 subscribers. In 2016, he began to get involved as an entrepreneur.

== Conception and development ==
In 2016, Maker Studios was bought by Disney, which planned to have YouTubers provide digital content. Coppins was approached by the Digomind production company to make a television pilot in which the theme was what he was already doing on his YouTube channel. They filmed the pilot in about two weeks and it was edited, as Coppins says, "basically, into YouTube videos. That’s kind of what that was, just with a bigger crew and production."

Seven months later, when the show was greenlit, Coppins was given about 1.5 months to make the show. In an interview with Monkeys Fighting Robots, Coppins said they filmed about 6-7 games for 90 minutes each daily, and in an interview with Tubefilter, he said they shot about 7–10 hours a day, three days a week. Coppins said that with the television format, the crew would handle the camera, lighting, and editing, which is something he would do himself for his YouTube videos.

== Format and recurring segments ==
Parker tries out various video games. He also has other video game YouTubers visit, including Jimmy Wong, Shubble, Whitney Moore, and CaptainSparklez.

This is structured with various recurring segments.

- "Scare the Heck Out of Parker" – Parker plays horror games such as Tattletail,^{Ep. 1-1} Emily Wants to Play,^{Ep. 1-16} Wick,^{Ep. 1-8} Hello Neighbor,^{Ep. 1-6} and Among the Sleep.^{Ep. 2-3}
- "Parker Plays Sports Network" – Parker plays a sports-themed video game and also announces the game as the character Tag Chetson.
- "Parker Vs the Fans" – Parker plays a game chosen by one of his fans.
- "Mystery Tube" – A container delivered by pneumatic tube dubbed Mystery Tube by Parker will give him an item and a note telling him to play a specific game.
- "Historian" - Parker has a British accent and wears a suit playing this character, who was mainly in the game that Parker played, "Reigns." Parker also uses this character's outfit and nonsense talk where he is a person at "Big Important TV Headquarters" where a skit is commonly used where Parker is screaming the background and he makes criticism.
- "Jame" - Occasionally, Parker will play and/or comment on games as a character he created named Jame. Jame is extremely laid back and often says pure nonsense, and his personality is where he like skateboarding, as well.
- "Parker's Virtual Reality" – Parker plays a virtual reality game.
- "Talking Parker" – An aftershow where Parker is interviewed by Jimmy Wong.
- ”Appy Fun Times” - Parker plays a mobile game, or app.
- “Skwad Goals” - Parker plays an online multiplayer and/or local multiplayer games with friends.

Occasionally the show will cut to a scripted skit. Often this occurs after Parker makes a comment about the game he is playing, and the skit will be based on the comment. Joel Rubin writes the skits.

== Series overview ==
Season	Episodes	Originally released	
Season	Episodes	First released	Last released
1	16	July 15, 2017	September 18, 2017
2	6	October 15, 2018	November 19, 2018

== Parker Animated ==
Parker Animated was a potential spin-off of Parker Plays where it would have Parker do segments based on cartoons that aired on Disney XD, only a pilot episode was made but it never aired.

=== Segments included ===
- "The Parkies" – This was an award show hosted by Parker where he would give out "The Golden Moustache" to one of three Disney XD shows for a specific category
- "Disney XD for Beginners" – In a parody of the For Dummies series, Parker would summarize Disney XD cartoons
- "Evil Eye for the Bad Guy" – Parker would give a touch up for the villains of Disney XD shows
- "Parker's Conspiracy Theories" – Parker would go over conspiracy theories about Gravity Falls
- "Re-Animated" – Parker and a guest would be shown a clip and would build a theme off of it. One of them would then tell a story with said theme, the story would be animated
- "Listen Up" – Parker and a guest would watch a clip from a Disney XD cartoon and would have to voice over the whole clip

== Works cited ==
- "Ep." is shortened form for episode and refers to a season and episode number of the Parker Plays show.
