= Girls (Exo-CBX EP) =

- Digital cover

EP by EXO-CBX
- Released: May 24, 2017
- Recorded: 2017
- Studios: In Grid (Seoul); MonoTree (Seoul); SM Big Shot (Seoul); SM LVYIN (Seoul)
- Genre: J-pop
- Length: 24:55
- Language: Japanese
- Label: Avex Trax
- Producers: Max Matsuura; Nam So-young; Ryuhei Chiba (General supervision)

EXO-CBX chronology
Hey Mama! (2016)	Girls (2017)	Blooming Days (2018)

Singles from Girls
- 1. "Ka-CHING!" Released: May 24, 2017

Girls is the debut Japanese extended play by Exo-CBX, the first official sub-unit of the South Korean-Chinese boy group Exo. It was released on May 24, 2017 by Avex Trax and distributed by Avex Music Creative. The EP features seven tracks in total including the Japanese version of their debut Korean single Hey Mama! and a bonus track that will be included only in the first edition of the album.

== Background and release ==
On March 10, 2017, it was revealed via a livestream that the Exo-CBX would have their debut in Japan later that year, sometime in May. On April 1, 2017 it was announced that EXO-CBX will release a Japanese EP entitled Girls on May 24, 2017. On April 26, it was revealed that the mini album will be released in four versions; The CD and DVD 'CBX' version, which includes the music video for "Ka-CHING!" and an off-shot movie, as well as the three CD only versions, 'Chen', 'Baekhyun' and 'Xiumin'. The track list of the extended play were released also on the same day. On April 28, a teaser of the title track "Ka-CHING!" was released. It was revealed that the song will be used as an ending theme for the "Nihon Terebi" show. On May 1, a short music video of the title track "Ka-CHING!" was released. Two additional, group teaser images also were released on the same day. On May 15, a highlight medley, featuring previews of the album's tracks was released. The EP was officially released on May 24.

== Promotions ==
=== Live performance ===
EXO-CBX performed "Ka-CHING!" and "Hey Mama!", the Japanese version, for the first time at the 2017 Girls Awards on May 3, 2017.

On June 7, the group performed "Girl Problems" for the first time on Exo-CBX "Colorful BoX" Free Showcase. The group also performed "Ka-CHING!" and "Hey Mama!".

On August 26, EXO-CBX performed "Hey Mama!", "Girl Problems" and "Ka-CHING!" on a-nation concert in Japan.

== Commercial performance ==
The special edition (Only available for EXO-L Japan) version of "Girls" was sold out in less than an hour upon its release, making the sub-group the fastest selling K-pop group in Japan, breaking their parent group's record.

"Girls" debuted at No. 2 on the Oricon Daily Albums Chart and selling 26,541 copies on its first day of release.

"Girls" is ranked No. 37 in Oricon's Top 100 albums of 2017 with sales of 59,656.

== Track listing ==
Girls track listing
No.	Title	Lyrics	Music	Arrangement	Length
1.	"Girl Problems"	Akira (Palm Drive)	Andreas Öberg; Daniel Caesar (Caesar & Loui); Ludwig Lindell (Caesar & Loui)	Caesar & Loui (The Kennel)	3:38
2.	"Ka-Ching!"	MEG.ME	Hanif Sabzevari (Hitmanic); Dennis DeKo Kordnejad (Hitmanic); Daniel Kim	Daniel Kim; Hitmanic	3:26
3.	"Hey Mama!" (Japanese version)	Jo Yoon-kyung; Sara Sakurai (T's Music)	Hyuk Shin (Joombas); Marco "MRey" Reyes (Joombas); Jarah Lafayette Gibson; Davey Nate (Joombas); DK (Joombas)	Joombas	3:19
4.	"Tornado Spiral"	Sara Sakurai (T's Music)	Andreas Öberg; Stephan Elfgren; Drew Ryan Scott	Andreas Öberg; Stephan Elfgren	3:39
5.	"Miss You"	Junji Ishiwatari	Sean Alexander (Avenue 52); Darren "Baby Dee Beats" Smith; Drew Ryan Scott	Avenue 52	3:26
6.	"Diamond Crystal"	Sara Sakurai (T's Music)	Daniel Caesar (Caesar & Loui); Ludwig Lindell (Caesar & Loui); Cage (Karl Oskar Gummesson) (The Kennel); Oneye; Hide Nakamura	Caesar & Loui (The Kennel); Cage (The Kennel)	3:43
7.	"King and Queen" (bonus track)	Amon Hayashi (Digz Inc.)	Geek Boy Al Swettenham; Daniel Kim	Geek Boy Al Swettenham; Daniel Kim	3:44
Total length:					24:55

=== DVD ===
1. Ka-CHING! -Video Clip-
2. Off Shot Movie (※初回盤のみ収録)

== Charts ==
Chart (2017)	Peak position
Japanese Albums (Oricon)	2
Japan Hot Albums (Billboard Japan)	2

== Sales ==
Region	Sales
Japan (Oricon)	71,933

== Release history ==
Region	Date	Format	Label	Ref
Japan	May 24, 2017	CD; DVD	Avex Trax	
Various	May 24, 2017	Digital download; streaming	Avex Trax	—
