= Boneworks =

2019 video game

- Developer: Stress Level Zero
- Publisher: Stress Level Zero
- Director: Brandon Laatsch
- Designer: Alex Knoll
- Composer: Michael Wyckoff
- Series: Stress Level Zero
- Engine: Unity
- Platform: Windows
- Release: December 10, 2019
- Genre: First-person shooter
- Mode: Single-player

Boneworks is a 2019 first-person shooter virtual reality game developed and published by Stress Level Zero. The game is designed to be entirely physics-based, with the player controlling a full virtual body that responds not just to the player's real-world input but also to obstructions in the game world.

In Boneworks, players take on the role of Arthur Ford, a rogue cybersecurity director who escapes into an unfinished simulated universe, battling through surreal architecture and mysterious scenes with a variety of experimental physics-based weaponry.

== Gameplay ==
Boneworks uses physics on almost every aspect of the game. All objects in the world can be interacted with by the player, taking into account the object's size, weight and material. Small objects like cups or hammers can be easily picked up one-handed while larger objects like crates or barrels take more effort to be moved. Stationary objects, like railings or mesh fences can be climbed instead of picked up.

In most VR titles, the player moves through the world via teleportation, and is represented by two non-corporeal hands which respond to the motion controllers. Boneworks instead uses a fully simulated body, which uses inverse kinematics based on the location of the player's head and hands.

This virtual body can be affected by the world around it, and may often be obstructed by objects in the virtual world. Analog sticks on the motion controllers moves the player similar to a non-VR game, with sprinting, jumping and crouching all performed either on controllers or in real life.

The player restraining an aggressive Nullbody enemy

In combat, the player is free to use any method to fight back. This includes fists, guns, or any object which can be moved, like bricks or chairs. Enemies can also be damaged realistically; for example, they can be punched, tripped, headbutted, and have complex injuries such as a broken leg inhibiting their walking. Heavier objects, and objects with more momentum, deal more damage but require more effort to move.

Level design is non-linear, with "very little to no actual game logic", allowing players to reach the end of the level through whatever means possible. Players are encouraged to progress through or replay the game as creatively as possible, taking advantage of the physical nature in any way they see fit. Examples include stacking boxes to climb over a wall instead of finding the key to the door. The game encourages creative ways of completing puzzles, including "cheating" or solving them in an unintended way, similar to how such a puzzle might be solved in a real-life scenario.

A variety of hidden easter eggs and rewards are found all throughout the main campaign, including 'modules' that unlock additional content. These rewards are hidden in 'Boneboxes', which often require extensive exploration or difficult platforming to reach.

In addition to the main campaign, two gamemodes allow for post-story content. The Sandbox game-mode allows the player to experiment with any item or entity in the game that they have unlocked (done by collecting their respective tokens in the campaign). Meanwhile, the Arena mode offers extra challenges to players, such as timed battles, weapon swaps and survival.

== Plot ==
Boneworks is set in Stress Level Zero's shared alternate universe, which incorporates other titles like Duck Season and Bonelab.

In the 1990s, the global conglomerate Gammon discovers a strange dimension known as the Voidway, which exists outside of space and time. This dimension contains a strange quantum particle (known as void particles) which can exist in multiple places at once. Using void particles, Gammon's rival, Monogon Industries, is able to create the BONEWORKS engine, which uses artificial intelligence and void particles to create infinite instances of virtual space, accessible via VR headsets.

Monogon uses the BONEWORKS engine to begin work on MythOS City, an infinite cityscape simulation designed as an endless source of virtual living space. By 1997, it is nearing completion. The player takes the role of Arthur Ford, the cybersecurity director for the MythOS project. Ford theorizes that the BONEWORKS engine could function as an entry point to the Voidway, which would allow for immortality by severing the connection between mind and body, leaving him to exist outside of space and time forever.

The game begins with a real-world cutscene showing an armed Arthur Ford retreating into a panic room and entering MythOS City with a virtual reality headset. In MythOS, Arthur Ford releases a virus which causes the leakage of void particles into MythOS City. This initiates a lockdown, booting everyone from the simulation and freezing the System Clock. Ford remains in the simulation and is shortly contacted by a fellow employee, Hayes, who requests that he reboot the System Clock to fix the leak, unaware that Ford is the cause of the problem.

Ford takes a shortcut through the unfinished Museum of Technical Demonstration, which serves as a tutorial for the game. He then passes through the grey-boxed streets of MythOS City. He discovers that the null bodies, non-sentient AI workers, have become sentient and violent, and attack him on sight. To combat the sentient null bodies, MythOS releases antivirus agents known as the Cleanup Crew, which automatically target Ford as well as the rogue null bodies.

After fleeing the City, Ford ends up in the runoff sewers, where he discovers zombified versions of himself. These undead Fords are hostile and attempt to stop him from progressing to the System Clock. However, Ford is able to fight them off. He is later contacted by a BONEWORKS developer, Alora, who has realized his true goal of entering the Voidway. She commends him on his initiative, admitting to plotting something similar herself, and requests that he leave the gateway open for others to enter as well.

Ford manages to leave the sewers and takes a train system to the heart of MythOS City – the Time Tower, a massive building which hosts the System Clock. Fighting off the full strength of Monogon's virtual forces, as well as his alternate zombie selves, Ford makes it to the System Clock, where he discovers a cult of sentient nullbodies who worship the System Clock. Killing them, Ford is able to destroy the Clock and enters the Voidway as MythOS dissipates into white light.

Ford finds himself in the Voidway, where a strange Void entity watches him and beckons him through a white door from Duck Season. Upon opening the door, Ford is suddenly pulled out of the Voidway and into a different BONEWORKS simulation.

He awakens in an unfinished, medieval-themed simulation called FantasyLand, where he meets many non-zombified variants of himself from alternate timelines, who were also successful in resetting the Clock and who were also pulled into FantasyLand, where they have remained trapped. These Fords have adopted FantasyLand as their home, and have constructed a massive castle out of various assets left behind by the developers. Here, Ford encounters King Ford, who challenges him for the throne. Our Ford is victorious and becomes the new King. With the help of all Fords, our Ford is able to escape FantasyLand and breach into the Voidway once again, after being warned by Hayes that Monogon has located Ford's body in the real world.

In the Voidway, Ford travels a vast distance to a massive building labelled 'Chamber 02'. Upon entering it, he finds himself in the cutscene room where all previous game cutscenes have taken place. Here, he is treated to one last real-world cutscene. Ford's panic room is broken into by Saberlake security agents, who secure the space and remove Ford's headset. A business executive (whose face is obscured by static) arrives and pulls out a gun, executing Ford while he is still unconscious. However, since Ford still exists in the Voidway, his goal was successful, having disconnected his mind and body. Ford watches the credits as various void entities approach and watch him.

== Development ==
Stress Level Zero, the developers behind Boneworks, had previously created two virtual reality titles – Hover Junkers and Duck Season, both of which used the classic floating hands design. After the release of Duck Season, Brandon Laatsch (lead developer and co-founder) wanted to create a 'more mainstream' game with the goal of pushing the medium of virtual reality forward, while also appealing to mainstream gamers. They decided on a first-person shooter due to its mainstream appeal.

Half-Life 2, a FPS created by Valve in 2004, was a source of inspiration due to its physics-based interaction. Laatsch felt that since then, input had barely changed, with almost all games either using a game controller or keyboard and mouse. SLZ decided that virtual reality was the most promising choice to further game innovation, due to its immersive nature.

The concept for Boneworks began in 2017, with Laatsch working on the concept of a physics-based virtual body. By 2018, Stress Level Zero was actively developing the title in Unity. The content outline was not finished until a full year of development had passed, during which time the physics and mechanics were fleshed out. According to developer Alex Knoll, the core premise of Boneworks remained strong while the setting, story and progression was fluctuating. Originally, the game was a gritty shooter set in an automated mining facility in the throes of robot revolution, titled Hall of the Machine King. This was eventually deemed too large a concept, and the company decided to start off with a smaller game to build up to Machine King. This title, known as DeadFM, was worked on for a few years until it too was too large. Stress Level Zero decided to adapt it into a more simple game designed to introduce players to fully physics-based VR locomotion, which became Boneworks.

A major challenge was designing a long game in VR, since motion sickness and fatigue is common in VR players. "We had to figure out what a longer form VR gameplay session looks like. Eventually playing just gets way too tiring for long sessions." In the end, they resolved to split the game into chapters, each of which can be completed in an average play session (around an hour). Due to a lack of game design and research around virtual reality, Stress Level Zero drew from other fields. Knoll stated that sports science, anatomy, physical therapy and classical mechanics were sources for design and mechanics.

The soundtrack, titled Bonetones, was created by Michael Wyckoff, who used physical synthesizers to produce "audible physicality with crunch and growl, difficult to replicate through a traditional computer workflow".

The plot was described as "a meta commentary on the VR industry" by Alex Knoll.

Boneworks was shown in a tech demo in 2018, and the game reached a playable, completable state in October 2019, and was released on Steam on December 10, 2019. During development, the YouTube channels BrandonJLA and Node released several devlogs describing and displaying the mechanics.

=== 1.1 – Post-Launch ===
Following the release of Boneworks, Stress Level Zero put out an announcement on Steam. Thanking players for their support, the studio promised to commit to long-term updates for the game. Post-Launch was made in 12 days, and was primarily designed according to player feedback, removing dozens of bugs and glitches. Laatsch added that sandboxes, weapons, physics tools, collectibles, and vehicles were all coming in future updates.

=== 1.3 – Save Spots ===
The untitled 1.3 update was a response to player feedback. Laatsch stated in a video update that the goal of 1.3 was to address those who were unhappy or unable to play Boneworks, while not ignoring those who had a positive experience. To address the former, the team added stations to save progress – previously, leaving the game partway through a level would force the player to restart from the level's beginning. For the latter, a new gamemode (known as Arena) was added, with a new map specifically for the gamemode.

=== 1.4 – [REDACTED] ===
1.4 introduced three new sandbox maps, two of which were previously revealed. These were the RedactedChamber, which was one of the first levels developed for Boneworks, and Tuscany, which was previously an Oculus exclusive map. In addition, the Handgun Range was released, which features the Tactical Trial game mode. Updates were also made to general physics, as well as a new pistol. 1.4 was released on April 9, 2020.

=== 1.5 – Zombie Warehouse ===
The 1.5 update, titled Zombie Warehouse, was headed by Cameron Bowen. It added a second Arena map, the titular Zombie Warehouse. Players use the unique Boardgun to fight zombies and create structures. The enemy AI was updated and modified for this update, allowing enemies to climb walls and slide down railings. Gamemodes include survival, waves, and the Cure (retrieving batteries to power a cure-all device.)

The Boardgun is a developer weapon that can spawn a board between two points. Designed by Kevin, a programmer, over the course of a weekend just before the launch of the base game, it was coupled with Cameron's concept of zombie survival. Laatsch required technical advancement to make the update, so the updated enemy AI was created.

=== 1.6 – Hover Junkers ===
1.6 was a crossover event with Stress Level Zero's first game, Hover Junkers. It adds a massive sandbox level designed to fly the hovercraft prominently featured in Hover Junkers, as well as several new items from the game. Stress Level Zero stated that the merging of properties was a design exercise for the studio, aiming to add different game styles, both aesthetically and mechanically, to identify whether Boneworks' physics-based sandbox style was viable across different genres.

== Reception ==
Reception

Aggregate score
Aggregator	Score
Metacritic	72/100

Review scores
Publication	Score
IGN	7.9/10
Jeuxvideo.com	15/20

Boneworks received "mixed or average" reviews from critics, according to the review aggregation website Metacritic.

Boneworks has been compared to Half-Life in its aesthetics and puzzles. The game was praised for having created an "incredible engine for a captivating VR adventure", and has been called "one of the best VR gun-adventure games on the market".

Rock Paper Shotgun described it as "an innovative adventure that pushes VR in all sorts of directions, but still suffers from a number of VR-specific issues."

Physics manipulation in Boneworks has been described as entering the "uncanny valley". The game has been criticized for its bugs, where the player's limbs can become stuck in game objects, as well as the content not being paced well and a lack of a coherent plot. It has been described as a "VR physics playground", and as being "conceived as a combat showcase first and a story-driven epic second – the Narbacular Drop to Valve's Portal.".

=== Sales ===
On the day of release, Boneworks reached the top best-sellers ranking and player count lists across Steam. As of March 2025, it has over 32,000 positive user reviews on Steam and an 80% five-star rating on the Oculus Store.

== Sequel ==
On April 20, 2022, Stress Level Zero revealed a trailer for Bonelab at the Meta Quest Gaming Showcase livestream. Previously known by its codename Project 4, Bonelab is made with the 1Marrow Interaction Engine, an in-house set of tools that handle interactions such as picking up objects. It is "built on its predecessor, pairing a brand new story with two years of innovation and interaction engine progress."

A major difference in Bonelab is official mod support. The main marketed feature of Bonelab is a feature called the BodyLog, giving the player the ability to morph into any avatar they want, with physical differences between larger, heavier avatars and smaller, quicker ones. Mods allow the player to download any character they can find, and use them during the campaign. Bonelab also features a body remapping system, allowing players to shape their virtual body to match their real one in all proportions. Custom items and maps are also available, able to be created with a Unity SDK.

Bonelab was released in September 2022, available on PCVR and the Meta Quest 2.

In late December 2023 on the Official Bonelab Discord, Brandon Laatsch spoke about an upcoming title in the SLZ universe relating to Boneworks codenamed B-side or Project 4.

In early 2025, Stress Level Zero has confirmed that they are working on bringing Boneworks to the Meta Quest 3, and that they are actively working on B-side, which the pre-production has started in 2025. The update brings in a entirely new physics engine dubbed Marrow 2, a continuation/update to their old engine made for Boneworks and Bonelab both made off of their on interaction engine dubbed Marrow 1. This update does not have a confirmed release date but is officially titled "Patch 789".
