= Bonelab =

2022 video game

- Developer: Stress Level Zero
- Publisher: Stress Level Zero
- Director: Brandon Laatsch
- Composer: Michael Wyckoff
- Engine: Unity
- Platforms: Meta Quest 2; Windows; Meta Quest 3; Meta Quest 3S
- Release: September 29, 2022
- Genre: First-person shooter
- Mode: Single-player

Bonelab (stylized BONELAB) is a 2022 video game developed and published by American studio Stress Level Zero. It is a sequel to the 2019 game Boneworks. The player controls an "heretic" peasant that escapes death and explores experimental worlds in a research lab in MythOS. Bonelab was released for Windows and Meta Quest 2 on September 29, 2022, and later for the Meta Quest 3 on October 10, 2023, and then for the Meta Quest 3S just over a year later on October 15, 2024.

== Gameplay ==
The game uses a fully simulated body that utilizes inverse kinematics. The player can use a body-log positioned on either elbow to change their avatar, which affects their in-game body proportions and ability to use items. The campaign takes place in small levels that each focus on different mechanics, from traditional first-person shooter levels to go-karting.

The player can also find capsule toys that unlock props, NPCs, and weapons in the sandbox mode upon being pulled apart. These capsules can be either hidden or out in the open. Some may require parkour skills or puzzle solving to reach.

The game has been compared to Garry's Mod and Half-Life 2 by critics and fans for its similarities and homages, such as the Crablet resembling the Headcrab and the Halfway Park level somewhat resembling the Construct map from Garry's Mod.

The developers of Bonelab have also announced a throwing your waste at enemies update in patch 7.

== Plot ==
The game takes place sometime after the events of The Clock reset by Arthur Ford in Boneworks. The player takes control of a peasant being hanged in Heaven's Reach, a town in Fantasyland. A knife appears, which the player uses to cut the noose and escape. They land in a cave leading out of Fantasyland. The player leaps down an opening within the wall employed for waste disposal. Navigating through a crawl-space, the player encounters their first enemy, the Crablet, a VR headset with four limbs, similar to an arachnid.

Defeating the enemy, the player activates a button, which opens a door granting access to a room where the next enemy is unveiled: the Nullbody. Upon entering the room, the player obtains a pistol from a locker labeled "Gun!". After defeating the Nullbodies, the player discovers a doorway providing access to the Fantasyland transport station, fighting Nullbodies and Crablets.

The player continues to fight off more Nullbodies and Crablets until they arrive at an air vent that connects to a container yard. Descending into said container yard, the player arrives in MythOS city and meets a new enemy, the firearm-equipped Omni-Projectors.

Following a battle with them, the player arrives at an elevator, where a mysterious voice welcomes them to LavaGang, at which point the elevator's cables break, causing the elevator to descend and propel the player upward to the elevator's roof. The elevator crashes, and the player awakens and opens the elevator door revealing the Bonelab Hub, the game's hub world housing all of the sections like Parkour, Sandbox, Arena, experimental, mods, and so on. Subsequently, they utilize a crane to extract orbs situated atop the section entrances, which are then positioned upon six adjacent pipes to unlock the quarantine door, thus enabling story progression.

Upon opening the quarantine door, the player enters the Dev Room, where they must utilize a small crane to extract a drainage plug embedded in the floor. Removing the plug allows the player to descend to the subsequent level which resembles Boneworks' "Runoff," but it is smaller in size. This level includes all previously encountered enemies by the player: Omni-projectors, Nullbodies, and Crablets and also introduces its first actual puzzles.

Following that, the player enters a roller coaster simulation known as Mine Dive, in which the player merely rides a roller coaster with no enemies present. Following that, the player reaches level 5, "Big Anomaly," which includes Omni-projectors, Crablets, Nullbodies, and a new foe, the "Corrupted Nullbody," which is a purple Nullbody variant that fires Void Energy balls at the player. At the end of the level, they encounter Jay W., who provides them with a device attached to their arm and transports them through a series of minigames to acquire avatars representing their primary trait, such as a Suburban Street Fighter-style game to obtain Strong, (which presented the game's first entirely human opponents), a Half-Life esque misty bridge-themed parkour stage to acquire Fast, a hell-themed arena wave game to obtain Heavy, (which introduces the skeleton enemy and the zombie enemy), a sandbox moon-themed space level to acquire the Small character, a go-kart racing level to unlock the Light character, and a climbing level to obtain the Tall character (which introduces the Void Turrets).

Following those levels, Jay activates the device located on the player's arm, enabling them to select from various avatars at any given time. Jay provides the player with a key and returns them to the Hub, at which point the player is required to place the key into the crane map to unlock the Boneworks door. Following that, the player will then destroy a crate marked "Boneworks," ascending the player to the next level. The player then reaches said next level, which involves the player's movement of heavy balls to open the doors to advance through the level. The player needs to utilize a powerful avatar for this purpose, like Heavy, to propel the balls into their designated positions, thereby opening the doors.

Following that entire segment, the player is thrust into a series of battles between Nullmen, Skeletons, Void Turrets, and Omni-Projectors. The player then advances through sewer systems, hallways, train stations, and puzzles, all of which utilize the new avatars the player has been granted. At the end of the level, the player boards an elevator, which transports them to the final level, where they are transported back to the Heaven's Reach village, where they then kill the majority of the town's residents.

Following Heaven's Reach's defeat, the players find themselves in a room with a windmill. Unexpectedly, an enormous hand bursts through the windmill's roof, and then stops the windmill from its rotation, allowing the player to climb the windmill and grasp the hand. The mysterious hand then ascends the player into "Void G114", where it is revealed to be Jay. Jay welcomes the player, asks them to push the taxi, and then requests they enter the car. As Jay transports the player, he speaks on his beliefs and ambitions while the credits begin to roll over a cover of the song "Don't Fence Me In". Upon completing the credits sequence and reaching the destination, Jay drops the player off at the menu screen and leaves to attend to another caller, while recommending the player to "start building!"

== Development ==
Bonelab was initially announced as "Project 4" (due to it being the studio's fourth game) at Oculus Connect 6 on September 25, 2019. However, there was no word for a long time afterward. Little was known about the game other than that it would be a sequel to Boneworks for the Quest and PCVR platforms.

The game was formally revealed at the Meta Quest Gaming Showcase on April 20, 2022, with a title and teaser trailer. It was confirmed to have modding support for both platforms and be built upon "two years of innovation and interaction engine progress”. After this announcement, interest and hype for the game rose over the months, with Director Brandon Laatsch frequently provided updates on his Twitter such as claiming that Bonelab was "playable from logos to credits" on July 23, 2022.

A surprise release date trailer for the game, disconnected from any showcases or events, came out on September 23, 2022. It showed more gameplay than all the previous trailers and said the game was releasing six days later on that very Thursday.

=== Post-launch development ===
Since the release of Bonelab, the game has had seven patches (excluding public beta), but Brandon Laatsch has stated online that Bonelab is focused on core-work, while the predecessor Boneworks was more focused on content, resulting in more time being spent on updates. However, the modding scene for Bonelab skyrocketed after launch with mods that added multiplayer, custom maps, more weapons, and avatars. In late December on X, Brandon asked the community if they would like to test the update over Christmas or wait till it's all fleshed out and release then. Despite most of the community, specifically modders, stating that they wanted the update over Christmas, SLZ decided to delay the update. On the 25th of February 2024, Brandon posted an update on X, showing that Bonelab would have mod browser mod.io integrated into the game, and also showing a brand new map named Test Chamber 02 that was cut from Boneworks. On March 10, 2024, Brandon posted another teaser, showing the new level loading system. On May 9, 2024, Brandon confirmed that unless plans change, the 4th patch would be released in that same month, alongside this Brandon replied saying that more work went into this game than Duck Season. Another comment on the same day spoke about 5 more patches. On June 6, 2024, Patch 4 was released with very few issues, except for a few IK and player tracking bugs. On July 18, 2024, Patch 5 released. On August 27, Patch 6 was released, adding more features to the games SDK.

== Reception ==
Reception

Aggregate score
Aggregator	Score
Metacritic	65/100

Review scores
Publication	Score
PC Gamer (US)	81/100
Road to VR	5/10

Bonelab received "mixed or average reviews", according to the review aggregator website Metacritic.

PC Gamer criticized the campaign's pacing, but enjoyed the improvements to melee combat, "most avatars I inhabited could swing a sword or club with ease... Blunt attacks land with satisfying weight". While disliking how prone the game was to causing motion sickness, Rock Paper Shotgun praised the gun handling of the game, writing that "the simulated weight and presence of Bonelab's two handed guns that makes it easy to keep track of where your hands are supposed to be". Road to VR felt the title's modding support had vast potential, but wrote that Bonelab's campaign had the same problems as its predecessor. UploadVR was impressed that the Meta Quest 2 version ran as well as it did, but noted numerous performance issues, "It's certainly playable, but not a completely smooth experience". In September 2025 it was reported that over 2 million people have played Bonelab on Meta Quest 2 alone.

=== Sales ===
Bonelab had grossed $1 million in the first hour of release on Quest 2 alone, setting records for the storefront as the fastest-selling game on Quest.
