= Exo-CBX =

Sub-unit of Exo

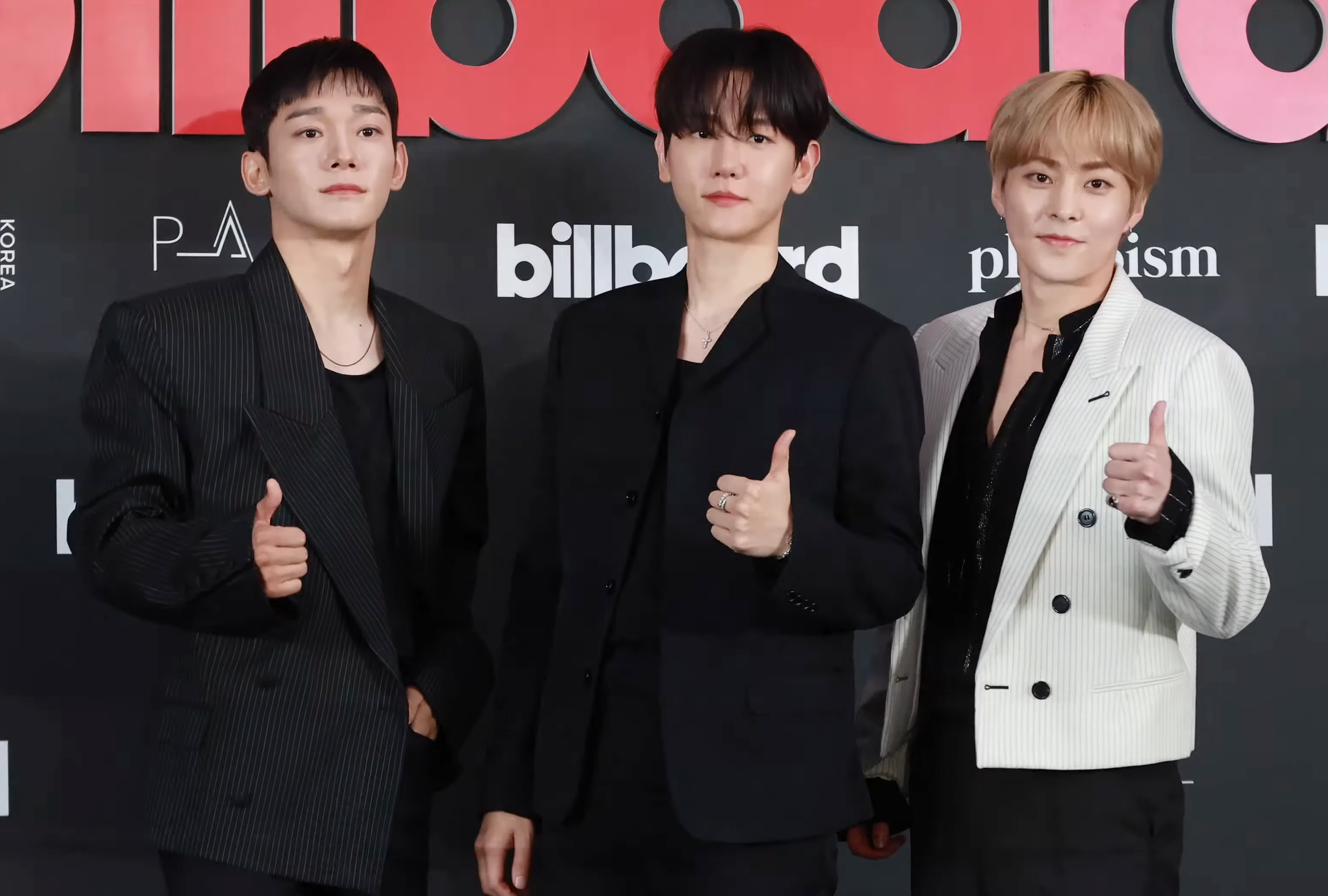
- Exo-CBX at Billboard K Power 100 in 2024; From left to right: Chen, Baekhyun, and Xiumin

Background information
- Also known as: ChenBaekXi; CBX
- Origin: Seoul, South Korea
- Genres: K-pop; R&B; dance-pop
- Years active: 2016–present
- Labels: SM; Avex Trax; INB100 (Note: Official English name of I&B100.)
- Spinoff of: Exo
- Members: Xiumin; Baekhyun; Chen
- Website: smtown.com/artists/10043

Exo-CBX (Korean: 엑소-첸백시; RR: Exo-Chen-Baek-Xi) is the first sub-unit of South Korean boy band Exo, consists of three members: Xiumin, Baekhyun, and Chen. They debuted on October 31, 2016, with the extended play (EP) Hey Mama!.

== History ==
=== 2016: Formation, debut with Hey Mama! ===
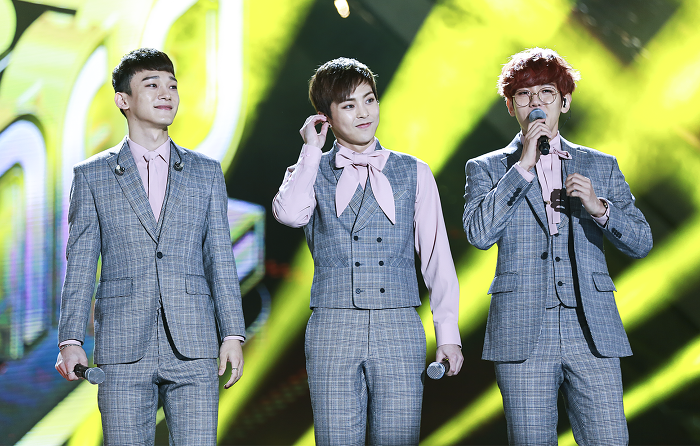
Exo-CBX at Busan One Asia Festival on October 23, 2016

On July 29, 2016, Chen, Baekhyun and Xiumin appeared in a video titled "Reservoir Idols" during Exo's concert tour Exo Planet #3 – The Exo'rdium. They then released an original soundtrack titled "For You" for the SBS television drama series Moon Lovers: Scarlet Heart Ryeo on August 23, 2016. As a result, it was speculated that they would form Exo's first sub-unit. This was confirmed by SM Entertainment on October 5. On October 23, they performed "For You" for the first time as a unit at the 2016 Busan One Asia Festival. On October 24, the unit's name was announced to be Exo-CBX (shortened from ChenBaekXi), after the first letter of the members' stage names.

On October 31, Exo-CBX released their debut extended play Hey Mama!, which contains five tracks with a variety of genres including electronic dance, R&B ballad and retro pop, along with the music video for the title track. The group made their debut performance on M Countdown on November 3. On November 6, the "Reservoir Idols" video was officially released as a music video for "The One", one of the tracks from the album. Hey Mama! topped the Billboard World Albums chart and South Korean's Gaon album chart. Later in November, Exo-CBX recorded a remake of the original soundtrack "Crush U" for the game Blade & Soul. They performed the song on November 18 at the N-Pop Showcase concert, part of the 2016 Blade & Soul world championship tournament. On December 25, "Crush U" music video was released.

=== 2017–2019: Debut in Japan tour, Blooming Days and Magic ===
On May 10, through EXO's official Japanese Twitter account, SM announced that the sub-unit was going to have a Japanese debut during late May. They released their debut Japanese mini album, Girls, on May 24.

In January 2018, via an online program on LINE, they announced that they have prepared for their first Japan arena tour called "Magical Circus" in May and June. The tour had eight shows with four cities in Japan, including: Yokohama, Fukuoka, Nagoya and Osaka. On April 10, the group released their second Korean mini album Blooming Days. CBX's first Japanese studio album, Magic, was released on May 9.

In February 2019, it was announced that the group would have Special Edition concerts of their Japanese tour "Magical Circus" in April.

=== 2023–present: Contract disputes and new label ===
On June 1, 2023, it was announced that Chen, Baekhyun, and Xiumin were in the process of terminating their contracts with SM, and had filed a joint lawsuit against the company in regards to transparency of earnings. On June 19, it was announced by SM that the contract dispute had been resolved, and the trio would be staying with the company moving forward.

On January 8, 2024, it was announced that the subunit's future activities and the members' solo activities would be managed by INB100, an independent label established by Baekhyun in June 2022, while their group activities still remains under SM Entertainment.

On December 30, 2025, it was announced that CBX would be performing at the 2026 Dream Concert, marking the group's return to the event after 9 years.

== Discography ==
=== Studio albums ===
List of studio albums, with selected details and chart positions
Title	Details	Peak chart positions		Sales
Title	Details	JPN Hot	JPN Oricon	Sales
Magic	Released: May 9, 2018 (JPN); Label: Avex Trax; Formats: CD, digital download	3	1	JPN: 64,417+ (Phy.); JPN: 1,331+ (Dig.)

=== Extended plays ===
List of extended plays, with selected chart positions and sales
Title	Details	Peak chart positions						Sales	Certifications (Note: In April 2018, Gaon Chart introduced music recording certifications for albums, downloads and streamings.)
Title	Details	KOR	FRA Dig.	JPN Hot	JPN Oricon	UK Down.	US World	Sales	Certifications
Hey Mama!	Released: October 31, 2016 (KOR); Label: SM Entertainment; Formats: CD, digital download	1	—	15	14	—	1	KOR: 303,389; JPN: 11,445; US: 2,000	—N/a
Girls	Released: May 24, 2017 (JPN); Label: Avex Trax; Format: CD, digital download	—	—	2	2	—	—	JPN: 71,933	—N/a
Blooming Days	Released: April 10, 2018 (KOR); Label: SM Entertainment; Formats: CD, digital download	1	63	20	10	74	2	KOR: 363,567; CHN: 107,012; JPN: 13,513	KMCA: Platinum
"—" denotes releases that did not chart or were not released in that region.

=== Singles ===
List of singles, with selected chart positions, showing year released and album name
Title	Year	Peak chart positions				Sales	Album
Title	Year	KOR	KOR Hot	JPN Hot	US World	Sales	Album
"Hey Mama!"	2016	4	—	—	7	KOR: 285,728	Hey Mama!
"Ka-Ching!"	2017	—	—	—	—	—N/a	Girls and Magic
"Blooming Day" (花요일)	2018	20	2	—	8	—N/a	Blooming Days
"Horololo"	2018	—	—	100	—	—N/a	Magic
"Paper Cuts"	2019	—	—	47	—	JPN: 1,122	Non-album single
"—" denotes releases that did not chart or were not released in that region. Notes: Billboard Korea K-Pop Hot 100 was introduced on May 29, 2017. Alibaba music chart discontinued in November 2017.

==== Promotional singles ====
Title	Year	Sales	Album	Notes
"Crush U"	2016	KOR: 20,936	Blade & Soul OST	
"Beautiful World" (아름다운 강산)	2018	—N/a	KONA Electric X EXO-CBX	Collaboration with Hyundai

=== Other charted songs ===
List of other charted songs, with selected chart positions and sales
Title	Year	Peak chart position		Sales	Album
Title	Year	KOR Gaon	KOR Billboard	Sales	Album
Korean
"The One"	2016	22	—N/a	KOR: 91,926	Hey Mama!
"Rhythm After Summer"	2016	28	—N/a	KOR: 69,690	Hey Mama!
"Juliet"	2016	27	—N/a	KOR: 71,044	Hey Mama!
"Cherish"	2016	25	—N/a	KOR: 90,891	Hey Mama!
"Playdate"	2018	83	3	—N/a	Blooming Days
"Sweet Dreams! " (내일 만나)	2018	87	4	—N/a	Blooming Days
"Monday Blues"	2018	91	5	—N/a	Blooming Days
"Vroom Vroom"	2018	93	6	—N/a	Blooming Days
"Thursday"	2018	96	7	—N/a	Blooming Days
"Lazy" (휴일)	2018	100	8	—N/a	Blooming Days
Japanese
"Diamond Crystal"	2017	—	—N/a	—N/a	Girls
"Miss You"	2017	—	—N/a	—N/a	Girls
"King and Queen"	2017	—	—N/a	—N/a	Girls
"Girl Problems"	2017	—	—N/a	—N/a	Girls
"Tornado Spiral"	2017	—	—N/a	—N/a	Girls
"Hey Mama! "	2017	—	—N/a	—N/a	Girls
"—" denotes releases that did not chart. Notes: Billboard Korea K-Pop Hot 100 was introduced on May 29, 2017. Alibaba music chart discontinued in November 2017.

=== Soundtrack appearances ===
Title	Year	Peak chart positions	Album
Title	Year	KOR	Album
"For You" (너를 위해)	2016	5	[달의 연인 - 보보경심 려 OST Part 1] 첸, 백현, 시우민 (EXO) - 너를 위해 MV
"It's Running Time"	2017	—	Running Man Animation OST
"Cry"	2017	—	Final Life: Even if You Disappear Tomorrow OST; Magic
"Someone Like You"	2018	88	Live OST
"Be My Love"	2019	117	Love Playlist Season 4 OST
"—" denotes that the release didn't chart in that region. Note: Alibaba music chart discontinued in November 2017.

== Filmography ==
=== Music videos ===
Title	Year	Director
Korean
"Hey Mama!"	2016	Unknown
"The One"	2016	Kwon Soonwook
"Crush U"	2016	Unknown
"It's Running Time! "	2017	Unknown
"花요일 (Blooming Day)"	2018	VM Project Architecture
"Beautiful World" (아름다운 강산)	2018	Unknown
Japanese
"Ka-Ching!"	2017	Ninomiya "NINO" Daisuke
"Horololo"	2018	Jinsoo Chung

=== DVDs ===
Title	Album details	Peak chart position		Sales
Title	Album details	JPN		Sales
Title	Album details	DVD	Blu-ray	Sales
Exo-CBX "Magical Circus" Tour 2018	Released: September 26, 2018; Languages: Japanese; Label: SM Entertainment	3	3	JPN: 21,292
Exo-CBX "Magical Circus" 2019 -Special Edition-	Released: August 21, 2019; Languages: Japanese; Label: SM Entertainment	4	6	—N/a

== Tours ==
- Magical Circus (2018)
- Magical Circus – Special Edition (2019)

== Awards and nominations ==
Name of the award ceremony, year presented, award category, nominee(s) of the award, and the result of the nomination
Award ceremony	Year	Category	Nominee / Work	Result	Ref.
Gaon Chart Music Awards	2019	Album of the Year – 2nd Quarter	Blooming Days	Nominated	
Gaon Chart Music Awards	2019	Song of the Year – April	"Blooming Day"	Nominated	
Golden Disc Awards	2019	Disc Bonsang	Blooming Days	Nominated	
Golden Disc Awards	2019	Disc Daesang	Blooming Days	Nominated	
Golden Disc Awards	2019	Popularity Award	Exo-CBX	Nominated	
Golden Disc Awards	2019	NetEase Most Popular K-pop Star	Exo-CBX	Nominated	
Melon Music Awards	2018	Best Dance Male	Exo-CBX	Nominated	
Mnet Asian Music Awards	2017	Best Asian Style in Japan	Exo-CBX	Won	
Mnet Asian Music Awards	2018	Best Unit	Exo-CBX	Nominated	
Mnet Asian Music Awards	2018	Song of the Year	"Blooming Day"	Nominated	
Mnet Asian Music Awards	2018	Mwave Global Fans Choice	Exo-CBX	Nominated	
Soribada Best K-Music Awards	2018	Bonsang Award	Exo-CBX	Nominated	
Soribada Best K-Music Awards	2018	Popularity Award (Male)	Exo-CBX	Nominated	
Soribada Best K-Music Awards	2018	Global Fandom Award	Exo-CBX	Nominated	
