= Fool's Gold (Aaron Carter song) =

Single by Aaron Carter

from the album LøVë
- Released: April 1, 2016
- Genre: Pop; R&B
- Length: 3:16
- Label: Sony; Z Entertainment
- Songwriters: Aaron Carter; Jon Asher; Melanie Fontana; Taylor Helgeson
- Producers: Carter; Michel Schulz

Aaron Carter singles chronology
"Ooh Wee" (2014)	"Fool's Gold" (2016)	"Sooner or Later" (2017)

"Fool's Gold" is a single by American pop musician Aaron Carter released on April 1, 2016. It is the first single to be released by Carter since 2002. The song appears on Carter's extended play LøVë and his 2018 album of the same name.

== Background and release ==
Carter began to tease the single in November 2015 via Twitter. On November 24, 2015, Billboard premiered a preview of the song. The song and its accompanying music video, co-directed by Carter and Jon Asher, were released on April 1, 2016.

== Critical reception ==
Spin wrote that "Fool's Gold" was "a decent little pop song" although the track "wasn't going to end up on any Best Of lists".

== Personnel ==
Credits adapted from Apple Music.

- Executive production: Aaron Carter, Jon Asher, Steven Zap
- Vocal production: Aaron Carter, Jon Asher
- Production: Michel Schulz
- Recording engineering: Jon Asher
- Mixing engineering: Andrew Wuepper
- Mastering engineering: Gene Grimaldi
