= Love (Aaron Carter EP) =

EP by Aaron Carter
- Released: February 10, 2017
- Genre: Pop; EDM
- Length: 16:40
- Label: Sony Music; Z Entertainment
- Producer: Aaron Carter; Michel Schulz

Aaron Carter chronology
The Music Never Stopped (2015)	Love (2017)	Love (2018)

Singles from Love
- 1. "Fool's Gold" Released: April 1, 2016; 2. "Sooner or Later" Released: January 20, 2017

Love (stylized as LØVË) is the third and final EP by American singer and songwriter Aaron Carter, released on February 10, 2017, by Sony Music. It is the first collection of songs released by Carter since 2002.

== Singles ==
On April 1, 2016, Carter released "Fool's Gold" as the first single from the EP. When speaking of the EP, Carter told Billboard:

"'The 'LøVë' album and 'Fool's Gold' era has been D.I.Y. hustle since day one. "Everything from the production, songwriting, mixing, photoshoots, music videos, packaging and distribution have been a collective involvement from a team I like to call 'Team Fool's Gold.'"

The second single was "Sooner or Later". In the lyrics, the singer expresses the love he feels for a woman he is trying to win back. The song was performed live at concerts prior to the release of the EP, and in some performances Carter sang remixed versions featuring new EDM riffs and styles. The music video was directed and edited by Bing & Liam Bruce.

Sanook.com wrote that the song features Caribbean beats and dubstep elements, and that its style and vocal delivery recall the sound of Justin Bieber. Other outlets made more specific comparisons, drawing parallels to Bieber 2015 single "What Do You Mean?". The Musical Hype stated that "production dominates" the record and that there is "more sound than legitimate or meaningful songwriting", concluding that the song is "okay at best" and "nothing to write home about". Entertainment Weekly called it as "heavy with tropical synths" and "slick and confident", adding that "it's no "Aaron's Party" - it's better". AllMusic highlighted the song as one of LØVË's standouts. The Daily Orange wrote that the song sounds like a mixture of The Chainsmokers' relaxed vocals from "Paris" and the pop electronica of Troye Sivan's "Youth". The Morning Call considered it "another sensitive, new-Bieber sound-alike".

In the Italian singles chart, published by Federazione Industria Musicale Italiana (FIMI), the single debuted at number 94 and peaked at number 82, remaining on the chart for a total of two weeks. The single was certified gold in the country. In the US, the song generated over 75 million streams in less than eight months, surpassing 85 million streams by July 2019. In Belgium, athough the single did not enter the Ultratop main chart, it peaked as Tip in both Flanders and Wallonia.

== Reception ==
The EP received positive reception by Entertainment Weekly. El Broide wrote that [Carter] "decided to take a tropical house approach with the project incorporating strong pop influences – and it works."

== Track listing ==
All songs are written by Jon Asher, Melanie Fontana, Taylor Helgeson, Michel Schulz and Aaron Carter; while being produced by the latter two.

No.	Title	Length
1.	"Fool's Gold"	3:16
2.	"Let Me Let You"	3:20
3.	"Sooner or Later"	3:32
4.	"Same Way"	3:06
5.	"Dearly Departed"	3:26

== Charts ==
Chart (2017)	Peak position
US Independent Albums (Billboard)	37
