= Brandon Laatsch =

American game developer and filmmaker

- Education: University of Southern California
- Occupations: Video game developer; filmmaker; YouTuber
- Notable work: Bonelab; Boneworks; Hoverjunkers; Video Game High School

Brandon Laatsch is an American game developer, filmmaker, and YouTuber known for founding game studio Stress Level Zero, directing Video Game High School, and producing other online video content.

== Early life ==
Laatsch was raised in Stillwater, Minnesota, Minnesota, where he went to high school with Corridor Digital founders Niko Pueringer and Sam Gorski. Laatsch studied sociology at the University of Southern California (USC).

== Career ==
=== Video work with Freddie Wong ===
Laatsch met Freddie Wong at USC in 2004. They uploaded their first video Aces, a comedy-action short film about a poker game that turns to a shootout, onto YouTube in 2006. Laatsch and Wong quit their jobs in 2010 to focus on YouTube full-time, making videos out of a shared loft in Downtown Los Angeles. Prior to this move, they did freelance visual special effects work and worked on direct-to-video films.. Their videos are inspired by a variety of video games, such as Mario Kart and Portal, employing visual special effects to place in-game conent into real-world footage.

Jon Favreau recruited the pair to help with the digital marketing campaign for his film, Cowboys & Aliens (2011), after having seen their videos from his 10-year old son. Through Favreau, the pair were allowed to use the Universal Studios Lot and props from Cowboys & Aliens in their short film. They made appearances on Jimmy Kimmel Live! in September 2011. Laatsch and Wong launched RocketJump.com in 2012. In 2014, Laatsch started a Kickstarter to crowdfund a feature film based on Minecraft for $600,000 USD. The project was cancelled by Mojang over IP concerns.

=== Stress Level Zero ===
Laatsch and Wong parted ways in 2013, with Wong focusing on Video Game High School and Laatsch pivoting into video game production. Through his new game studio Stress Level Zero, Laatsch released the VR game Hover Junkers in April 2016 on the HTC Vive. In 2016, Chinese game publisher FunPlus invested an undisclosed amount of venture capital into Stress Level Zero.

In 2017, Stress Level Zero published Duck Season VR, an experimental first-person narrative, where the player has a one-day rental of 'Duck Season' to play on their 'Kingbit Entertainment System' in the summer of 1988. The plot mainly revolves around a dog mascot who inhabits the game, where if provoked, begins stalking the player in the game's "real world". Duck Season VR includes elements of humor, mystery, horror, multiple unique endings, and various minigames. The studio later ported the game to desktop in 2019.

On December 10, 2019, Stress Level Zero published Boneworks, an experimental physics-based first-person-shooter VR game developed with the Unity engine. In February 2020, Stress Level Zero published Boneworks onto the Oculus VR Store, along with a temporarily-exclusive level called "Tuscany", a level from one of the earliest versions of the Oculus software; this level was later added into the full game in update 1.4, released April 9, 2020.

On September 29, 2022, Stress Level Zero published Bonelab onto the Oculus VR Store and Steam, a modified version of Boneworks specially designed for modding capabilities.

In January 2026, Stress Level Zero announced plans on publishing their next big game, code-named "B-Side". B-Side is planned to run on the Unity3D game engine using the Marrow Interaction Engine's next update, Marrow 2. However, Marrow 2 has not come out yet.
