= Alana Austin =

Retired American film and television actress

- Born: Palm Springs, California, U.S.
- Occupation: Actress
- Years active: 1992–2006
- Known for: Motocrossed; A Simple Twist of Fate; Ink
- Father: Steven Kent Austin

Alana Austin (born April 6, 1982) is an American retired film and television actress. She played the role of Abby Logan in the sitcom Ink and starred in the Disney Channel Original film Motocrossed.

== Career ==
Austin was born in Palm Springs, California. She is the daughter of Steven Kent Austin a film producer who was the founder and chairman of the now-defunct Tag Entertainment.

Austin made her major acting debut in the 1992 TV film Criminal Behavior starring Farrah Fawcett. Three subsequent 1993 TV films followed before co-starring in the 1994 theatrical film North. She then co-starred in the film A Simple Twist of Fate with Steve Martin for which was nominated for a Young Artist Award.

In 1996, Austin was cast in the CBS sitcom Ink opposite Ted Danson and Mary Steenburgen, the series was later canceled after its first season. She then went to guest star on Sister, Sister, In the House, That '80s Show, 7th Heaven, Boston Public, Cold Case and Close to Home. As well as appearing in the films Road Rage, Hansel and Gretel, A Mother's Instinct, Popstar (opposite Aaron Carter) and the Disney Channel Original film Motocrossed.

She was also scheduled to appear in a unproduced movie based on the Monster Jam tour which would have acted as a sequel to Motocrossed.

== Filmography ==
=== Film ===
| Year | Title | Role | Notes |
|---|---|---|---|
| 1994 | North | Sarah | |
| 1994 | A Simple Twist of Fate | Mathilda McCann - age 12 | |
| 2000 | Castle Rock | Andy | |
| 2001 | Motocrossed | Andrea "Andi" Rose Carson | |
| 2002 | Hansel & Gretel | Wood Faerie | |
| 2002 | No Place Like Home | Mel McGregor | |
| 2004 | Motocross Kids | Callie | |
| 2005 | Supercross | Rider Girlfriend | |
| 2005 | Popstar | Jane Brighton | |
| 2006 | Miracle Dogs Too | Natalie | Video |

=== Television ===
| Year | Title | Role | Notes |
|---|---|---|---|
| 1992 | Criminal Behavior | Little Jessie | TV film |
| 1993 | Darkness Before Dawn | Mary Ann Guard - Age 9 | TV film |
| 1993 | Ambush in Waco: In the Line of Duty | Betsy | TV film |
| 1993 | Final Appeal | Linda Biondi | TV film |
| 1995 | In the House | Terry | "Female Trouble" |
| 1996 | A Mother's Instinct | Amanda | TV film |
| 1996-1997 | Ink | Abby Logan | Main role |
| 1997 | Sister, Sister | Beth | "Show Me the Money", "A Friend in Deed" |
| 1999 | Dangerous Waters | Chrissie | TV film |
| 1999 | Road Rage | Cynthia Carson | TV film |
| 2001 | Motocrossed | Andrea "Andi" Carson | TV film |
| 2001 | The Retrievers | Liz Lowry | TV film |
| 2002 | That '80s Show | Girl | "Pilot" |
| 2002 | 7th Heaven | Maria Davis | "Hot Pants" |
| 2002 | Boston Public | Jen Kenney | "Chapter 31", "Chapter 47" |
| 2002 | The Santa Trap | Carla | TV film |
| 2003 | Miracle Dogs | Kelly Maguire | TV film |
| 2005 | Cold Case | Angie Parrington (1988) | "Family" |
| 2006 | Close to Home | Kellie Sexton | "Truly, Madly, Deeply" |
