= Motocrossed =

2001 television film directed by Steve Boyum

- Promotional advertisement
- Genre: Action; Adventure
- Based on: Twelfth Night by William Shakespeare
- Written by: Ann Austen; Douglas Sloan
- Directed by: Steve Boyum
- Starring: Alana Austin; Riley Smith; Mary-Margaret Humes; Trever O'Brien
- Theme music composer: Christopher Brady
- Country of origin: United States
- Original language: English

Production
- Producer: George W. Perkins
- Cinematography: João Fernandes
- Editor: Craig Bassett
- Running time: 92 minutes
- Production companies: Film Roman; Stu Segall Productions

Original release
- Network: Disney Channel
- Release: February 16, 2001

Motocrossed is a 2001 American sports drama film released as a Disney Channel Original Movie about a girl named Andrea Carson who loves motocross, despite the fact that her father finds her unsuited for the sport, being that she is "just a girl". When her twin brother Andrew dislocates his knee just before a big race, their father is forced to go to Europe to find a replacement rider. In the meantime, Andrea secretly races in Andrew's place with her mother's help. The movie is a loose adaptation of William Shakespeare's Twelfth Night. The film also had a lot of product placement with many of the clothing, motocross gear and bikes seen from real extreme sports companies including Vans, Suzuki, No Fear and Fox Racing.

== Plot ==
The fast-moving Carson family gets ready to take on their next challenge as eldest son Andrew (Trever O'Brien) gears up for a motocross race with the hopes of winning a corporate sponsorship.

Twin sister Andrea "Andy" Carson (Alana Austin) finds herself in a bind when her love for motocross racing provokes her overprotective father, Edward (Timothy Carhart), who is averse to the idea of his daughter participating in such a dangerous sport and prefers that she stick to "girl things". When their parents are out of the house for the day, Andrea and Andrew decide to have a friendly race on the family track. While racing, Andrew loses control of his bike, causing him to be thrown off and crash, injuring his knee which renders him unable to race in the Cup. Edward is forced to quit his job, dipping into the family's finances to find a replacement rider from Europe.

Fueled by her desire to get on the track and feeling guilty over her brother's injury, Andrea forms a plan to masquerade as her brother, to which Andrew reluctantly agrees. Andrea is "welcomed" by unfriendly competition and comes back home with a scrape on her arm, which makes her mother, Geneva (Mary-Margaret Humes), suspicious. After dragging the answer out of youngest son Jason (Scott Terra) and a whole night to think it over, Geneva secretly (and reluctantly) agrees to let Andrea race in Andrew's place. The catch, however, is that this all needs to happen behind Edward's back, and before he comes home with a replacement rider.

Andrea and her mother arrive at the race venue and register under her brother's name, "Andy". In spite of her initial confidence, Andrea learns the hard way that competition is fierce, and finishes last in her first race. Thinking that Andrea is a guy, competitor Dean Talon (Riley Smith) takes notice when the "lapper" garners the attention of several young women, finding it unbelievable that a 125 rider is getting looks. Dean, knowing that "Andrew" needs help with riding, offers to help the rookie in exchange for advice on his crush, Faryn Henderson (Katherine Ellis).

Andrea quickly finds herself falling for Dean, who she reluctantly helps win Faryn's shallow affection. Her training also pays off when she places 7th in a following race. She continues to improve and takes 1st place in the last race of the day to get an overall 3rd place finish. The celebrating is cut short by the arrival of her angry father who scolds Andrea for racing and Geneva for letting her.

Edward has now found a replacement rider from France, René Cartier (Michael Cunio). He is poorly received by Andrea after he tries to hit on her and treats her brothers with disrespect. After some research, Andrea learns that Cartier has garnered a bad reputation for his harsh, underhanded and dangerous behavior on the track, but when Andrew brings it to Edward's attention, he says that an aggressive rider is what the family needs at the moment.

Andrea finds no further solace when she finds Cartier talking with Art Henderson, a competitor, though she is only scolded by Edward when he sees the two of them arguing. Back at camp, the Carson family confront Edward for the way he's treating Andrea. He tries to defend himself, but Geneva and Andrew show him how much he's really hurting Andrea by behaving the way he is. Alone in his thoughts, Edward begins to realize how much racing really means to Andrea and the support the rest of the family has given her. He finds Andrea arguing with Cartier; Andrea says that she's only trying to help her family, and Cartier rudely tells her to back off before shoving her. Edward sees it, runs over to them and shoves Cartier back in retaliation before telling him off and firing him. He and Andrea then go for a walk, where Edward tells her that he is proud of her for bringing Carson Racing to where it is now. Andrea admits her only regret was that instead of Andrew that got injured, it was her. Edward tells her not to think about anything else, and allows her to race in the final heat.

On the final race, Andrea and Cartier, now racing under Art Henderson Racing, find themselves fighting fiercely for the finish. When Cartier fumbles on a turn, Andrea takes the victory and finishes 1st. However, an angry Cartier exposes her during a live interview, much to the shock of the entire community and Dean's dismay. A heated argument between the Carson family and Art Henderson Racing gets under way about disqualifying Andrea by saying that a girl isn't allowed to compete, which Geneva argues, saying that she read the rules and it doesn't mention anywhere about girls not being allowed to race. Henderson then tries to argue that Andrea wasn't registered, and Geneva pulls out the registration form showing that Andrea did register under "Andy Carson", as it is short for Andrea. Barbara Rollins (Aloma Wright), the corporate CEO, expresses her inspiration at Andrea's actions, much to Henderson and Cartier's embarrassment. She is inspired that a woman "came on top in a man's sport," and not only allows Andrea to retain her title, but also awards the entire Carson family a full factory sponsorship.

Back at home, Geneva surprises the kids with the news that they have the privilege of hiring a 250 rider for the next race. She then tells the kids that someone is already interested in the job, and is at the house to interview. Upon walking outside, Andrea finds Dean who says that he heard they needed a 250 rider. Andrea then challenges him to a race; if he wins, he can be the new 250 rider. The movie ends with Dean and Andrea racing.

== Cast ==
- Alana Austin as Andrea "Andi" Rose Carson
- Riley Smith as Dean Talon
- Timothy Carhart as Edward Carson, Andrea's father
- Mary-Margaret Humes as Geneva Carson, Andrea's mother
- Trever O'Brien as Andrew "Andy" Carson, Andrea's fraternal twin brother
- Scott Terra as Jason Carson, Andrea's younger brother
- Michael Cunio as Rene Cartier
- Mark Curry as Bob Arness
- Katherine Ellis as Faryn Henderson
- A.J. Buckley as Jimmy Bottles
- Dwight Ketchum as Donny Barrett
- Jeremy McGrath as Rider 1
- Travis Pastrana as Rider 2

== In popular culture ==
Motocrossed was referenced in season four of The Bear as an ideal Disney Channel Original Movie with a romantic subplot.
