= Steve Boyum =

TV and film director and stunt performer

- Born: Stephen Maurice Boyum; September 4, 1952 (age 73); Los Angeles, California
- Occupations: stunt performer television director film director
- Years active: 1975–present

Steve Boyum (born September 4, 1952) is a long-time Hollywood stunt performer, television director, and film director. He has appeared in over 60 films as a stunt performer. He has lived in Malibu, California since 1974.

== Selected filmography ==
=== Director ===
- Meet the Deedles (1998)
- Johnny Tsunami (1999)
- Mom's Got a Date with a Vampire (2000)
- Stepsister from Planet Weird (2000)
- Motocrossed (2001)
- Slap Shot 2: Breaking the Ice (2002)
- Timecop 2: The Berlin Decision (2003)
- King Solomon's Mines (2004)
- La Femme Musketeer (2004)
- Supercross (2005)
- Supernatural (2006–2015)
- Numbers (2007–2009)
- NCIS: Los Angeles (2009)
- Human Target (2010–2011)
- Hawaii Five-0 (2011–2013)
- Castle (2011)
- Revolution (2012–2014)
- Forever (2014)
- Black Sails (2015–2017)
- Rush Hour (2016)
- Lethal Weapon (2016–2018)
- Blood & Treasure (2019)
- The Boys (2020)
- Gen V (2023-2025)
- Goosebumps (2023)
- The Old Man (2024)

=== Stunt performer ===
- Apocalypse Now (1979)
- The Blues Brothers (1980)
- Lethal Weapon 2 (1989)
- Patriot Games (1992)
- True Romance (1993)
- True Lies (1994)
- Mr. Holland's Opus (1995)
- You, Me and Dupree (2006)

=== Actor ===
- Rollerball (1975) - Biker (uncredited)
- Kolchak: The Night Stalker episode "Chopper" (1975) - Harold "Sword Man" Baker (uncredited)
- Zero to Sixty (1978)
- Herbie Goes Bananas (1980) - Panama Policeman
- Predator (1987) - Hostage Executed by the Russian (uncredited)
