= Phantom of the Megaplex =

2000 television film directed by Blair Treu

- Film poster
- Genre: Action; Comedy; Mystery
- Written by: Stu Krieger
- Directed by: Blair Treu
- Starring: Taylor Handley; Corinne Bohrer; Caitlin Wachs; Jacob Smith; Rich Hutchman; Mickey Rooney
- Theme music composer: Bill Elliott
- Country of origin: United States
- Original language: English

Production
- Producers: Joan Barnett; Jack Grossbart; Stu Krieger; Christopher Morgan
- Cinematography: Derek Rogers
- Editor: Martin Nicholson
- Running time: 89 minutes
- Production company: Grossbart Barnett Productions

Original release
- Network: Disney Channel
- Release: November 10, 2000

Phantom of the Megaplex is a 2000 American comedy mystery film and Disney Channel original movie, produced by the Disney Channel. With a title and concept very loosely based on Gaston Leroux's 1910 novel The Phantom of the Opera, the film concerns strange happenings at a monstrous megaplex on the night of the premiere of a major movie, Midnight Mayhem.

The central character, played by Taylor Handley, is Pete Riley, the 17-year-old assistant manager of the theater. He has to cope with malfunctioning equipment, disappearing staff, and a broken popcorn machine, among other headaches. He investigates to see if the troubles are coincidence or the result of sabotage by a mysterious "phantom." The senior manager of the theater is played by Rich Hutchman, and Ricky Mabe, Julia Chantrey, Joanne Boland, J.J. Stocker, and Lisa Ng appear as other employees of the theater. Caitlin Wachs and Jacob Smith play the central character's younger siblings, and Heather and Jennifer Bertram appear as his love interest and her friend.

== Plot ==
17-year-old Pete Riley works as the assistant manager at the local 26-screen grand megaplex, a job that he loves and spends the majority of his time at. Rumor has it that the megaplex is haunted by a "phantom," someone who was trapped inside the old movie theater that was demolished to build the current megaplex. Pete, senior manager Shawn MacGibbon, the other employees, and an elderly member of the family who once owned the original theater known as "Movie Mason" (played by Mickey Rooney) who loves movies and thinks he works at the megaplex, are working to prepare the theater for the star-studded premiere of the new Hollywood blockbuster Midnight Mayhem. Wolfgang Nedermayer, the owner of the megaplex, is to be among the guests. To Pete's disappointment, he is forced to bring along his younger siblings, 13-year-old Karen and 10-year-old Brian, to the theater while their widowed mother goes out on a date with her boyfriend George.

Pete dumps his siblings in a movie (which Karen ditches to see a horror movie with her friends) so he can focus on setting up for the premiere, but problems begin to pop up all through the megaplex. The other movies begin to suffer mishaps, which Karen and Brian realize are all related to the titles of the films being shown (for example, a theater showing a movie called Cyclone Summer has a giant fan moved in front of the screen, which blows everyone out of their seats). Pete, Karen, and Brian work together and discover that the rumored phantom is behind these acts of sabotage. Through online spoilers, Brian and Karen are able to learn the movie's plot, and Pete is able to stop the phantom from sabotaging the premiere. The phantom is revealed to be Shawn, who Nedermayer immediately fires and permanently bans, however, Shawn explodes with anger as he did all this so Nedermayer would finally notice him (and get his name right, since he never did). Shawn is then offered partnership by the director of Midnight Mayhem to make a movie based on his exploits—Phantom of the Megaplex: The Shawn McGibbon Story.

Nedermayer offers Pete the job of senior manager at the megaplex, something Pete has always wanted. Though Pete tells Nedermayer that he'd be honored, he turns down the job. Inspired by Karen and Brian from their help exposing Shawn as the phantom, Pete realizes the importance of his childhood and doesn't want to waste it anymore, asking for the rest of the night off, Nedermayer complies, giving Pete money to treat his girlfriend Caitlin Kerrigan to a nice breakfast after the film. George proposes to Julie, as per suggested by Brian who said a 4–star ending was needed to wrap things up. As everyone enters the movie theater, Movie Mason explains to Brian that he never once believed in the Phantom of the Megaplex; however, "the Werewolf of the Megaplex is another story." Both enter the theater as an employee, "Scary Terri" (known for her horrifying stories), closes the doors as a wolf howl sounds.

== Cast ==
- Taylor Handley as Pete Riley, 17-year-old assistant manager of the theater.
- Corinne Bohrer as Julie Riley, Pete's widowed mother.
- Caitlin Wachs as Karen Riley, Pete's 13-year-old sister.
- Jacob Smith as Brian Riley, Pete's perceptive 10-year-old brother.
- Rich Hutchman as Shawn MacGibbon, the theater's senior manager who is constantly worried about his job.
- John Novak as George, Julie's boyfriend.
- Colin Fox as Wolfgang Nedermayer, the owner of the megaplex who never gets Shawn's name right.
- Mickey Rooney as Mason / Movie Mason, elderly movie fan. His family opened the old theater before the megaplex was built. When the theater closed down and the megaplex opened, Mason thought that he worked there, though technically he doesn't. He comes to the theater every day and is welcomed and well liked by all the staff, except Shawn.
- Ellen-Ray Hennessy as Tory Hicks (business manager of/press agent for Madison Ashley Metts).
- Larissa Gomes as Madison Ashley Metts, the star of Midnight Mayhem.
- Carlo Rota as Tyler Jesseman, the director of Midnight Mayhem.
- Eric Hempsall as Lamonica, the new general manager (and Nedermayer's son-in-law).
- Ricky Mabe as Ricky Leary / Ricky Rules, a theater worker who has the correct procedure for anything and does everything by the book.
- Julia Chantrey as Terri Tortora / Scary Terri, a theater worker who loves telling scary stories.
- Joanne Boland as Hilary Horan / Hillary Honey, a theater worker who is described as a grandma in a teenage body due to her caring personality.
- J.J. Stocker as Mark Jeffries / Question Mark, a theater worker who is a bit slow-witted, always asking questions.
- Lisa Ng as Lacy Ling / Racy Lacy, a theater worker who is known for being quick in movement and personality ("She never walks when she can run").
- Joe Pingue as Merle, the theater's head projectionist. Even on a simple question, he has a habit of saying too complicated of an answer in return.
- Heather Bertram as Caitlin Kerigan, a girl Pete has a crush on.
- Jennifer Bertram as Lisa, Caitlin's friend.
- Jeff Berg as Donny Hollie, Pete's rival.
- Daniel DeSanto (credited as Daniel De Santo) as Zeke, theater worker.
- Nicole Hardy as April Popko, Karen's friend with whom she sees a scary movie despite Julie not letting her.
- Marcia Diamond as Verna the elderly Cinema Sitter (who makes sure underage children don't sneak into non-G-rated movies).
- Sarah Gadon as Erica, Karen's other friend.

== See also ==
- Adaptations of The Phantom of the Opera
