= Endicott, Washington =

Endicott
- Town
- Endicott, Washington
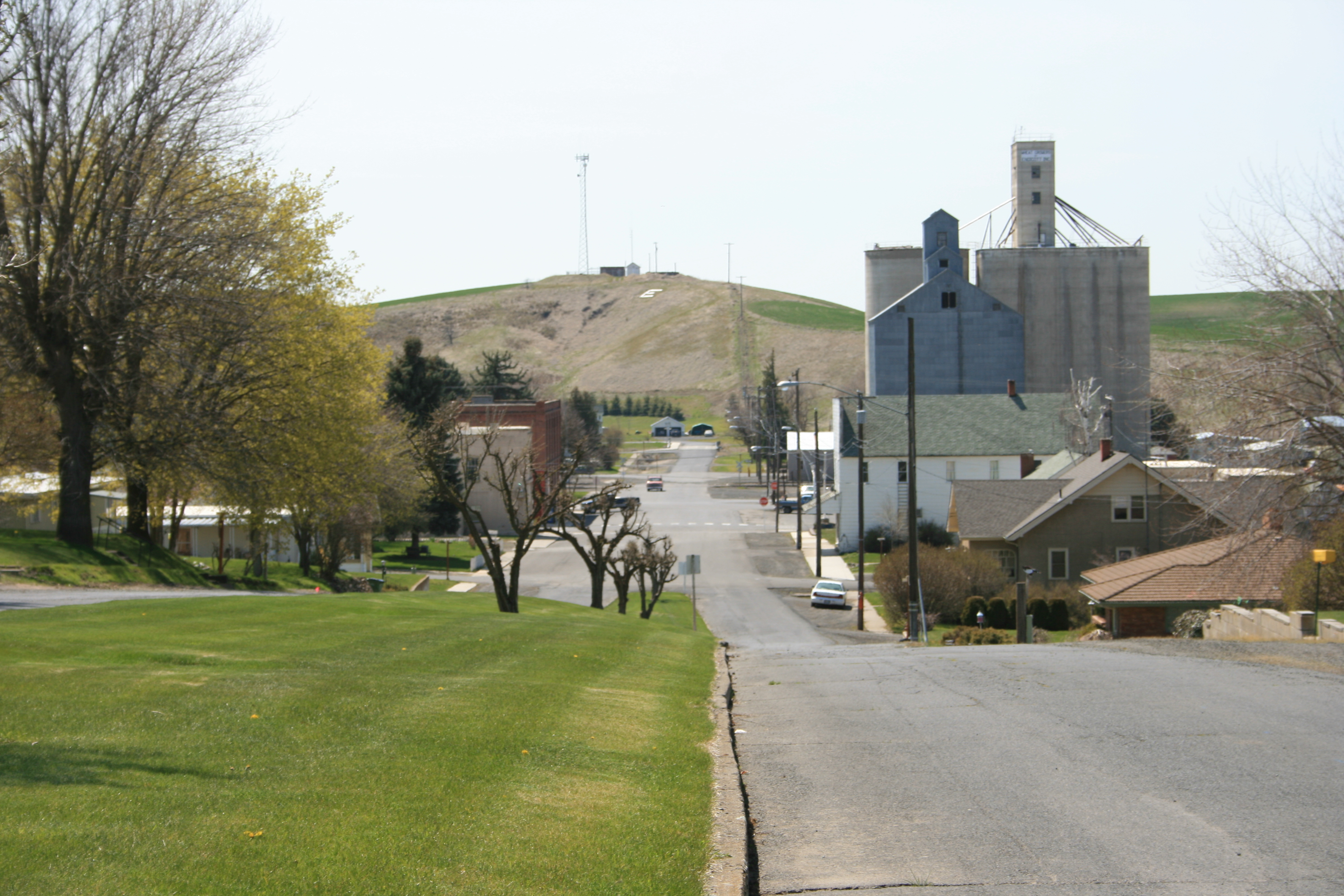
- Endicott from the north

- Location of Endicott, Washington
- Coordinates: 46°55′42″N 117°41′12″W
- Country: United States
- State: Washington
- County: Whitman
- Incorporated: 1905

Government
  - Mayor: Dean Marry

Area
  - Total: 0.30 sq mi (0.77 km^{2})
  - Land: 0.30 sq mi (0.77 km^{2})
  - Water: 0 sq mi (0.00 km^{2})
- Elevation: 1,706 ft (520 m)

Population (2020)
  - Total: 312
  - Density: 1,000/sq mi (410/km^{2})
- Time zone: UTC-8 (Pacific (PST))
  - Summer (DST): UTC-7 (PDT)
- ZIP code: 99125
- Area code: 509
- FIPS code: 53-21730
- GNIS feature ID: 2412488
- Website: endicottwa.wordpress.com

Endicott is a town in Whitman County, Washington, United States. The population was 312 at the 2020 census.

== History ==
Endicott was platted in 1882 and named for William Endicott Jr of the Oregon Improvement Company. Endicott was officially incorporated on February 11, 1905.

=== Population and activity ===
The population of Endicott peaked in 1920, and has decreased since. This was caused by improved farm technology, allowing more area to be farmed by the same number of people. The decrease in population has affected the economy of the town: in the 1950s, the town had numerous stores; in 2011, the town has only a grocery store, a post office and a service station. In 1987 the Endicott High School was closed as the Endicott district merged with neighboring community of St John: the class of 1986 only had one student. The elementary school is still operational, and the community hosts the middle school for both St. John and Endicott.

== Geography ==
According to the United States Census Bureau, the town has a total area of 0.29 square miles (0.75 km^{2}), all of it land.

== Demographics ==
Historical population
Census	Pop.	Note	%±
1910	474		—
1920	634		33.8%
1930	512		−19.2%
1940	495		−3.3%
1950	397		−19.8%
1960	369		−7.1%
1970	333		−9.8%
1980	290		−12.9%
1990	320		10.3%
2000	621		94.1%
2010	289		−53.5%
2020	312		8.0%
U.S. Decennial Census; 2015 Estimate

=== 2010 census ===
As of the 2010 census, there were 289 people, 141 households, and 77 families living in the town. The population density was 996.6 inhabitants per square mile (384.8/km^{2}). There were 165 housing units at an average density of 569.0 units per square mile (219.7 units/km^{2}). The racial makeup of the town was 96.2% White, 3.1% Native American, and 0.7% from two or more races. Hispanic or Latino of any race were 1.7% of the population.

There were 141 households, of which 18.4% had children under the age of 18 living with them, 41.8% were married couples living together, 9.2% had a female householder with no husband present, 3.5% had a male householder with no wife present, and 45.4% were non-families. 43.3% of all households were made up of individuals, and 17.7% had someone living alone who was 65 years of age or older. The average household size was 2.05 and the average family size was 2.81.

The median age in the town was 51 years. 19% of residents were under the age of 18; 4.8% were between the ages of 18 and 24; 15.6% were from 25 to 44; 39.8% were from 45 to 64; and 20.8% were 65 years of age or older. The gender makeup of the town was 47.4% male and 52.6% female.

=== 2000 census ===
As of the 2000 census, there were 621 people, 140 households, and 99 families living in the town. The population density was 2,150.8 people per square mile (830.4 people/km^{2}). There were 166 housing units at an average density of 574.9 units per square mile (222.0 units/km^{2}). The racial makeup of the town was 84.70% White, 1.93% African American, 0.32% Native American, 8.05% Asian, 2.58% from other races, and 2.42% from two or more races. Hispanic or Latino of any race were 5.31% of the population.

There were 140 households, out of which 38.6% had children under the age of 18 living with them, 52.1% were married couples living together, 15.0% had a female householder with no husband present, and 28.6% were non-families. 27.9% of all households were made up of individuals, and 15.7% had someone living alone who was 65 years of age or older. The average household size was 2.49 and the average family size was 3.05.

In the town, the age distribution of the population shows 18.4% under the age of 18, 39.0% from 18 to 24, 23.0% from 25 to 44, 10.0% from 45 to 64, and 9.7% who were 65 years of age or older. The median age was 23 years. For every 100 females, there were 105.1 males. For every 100 females age 18 and over, there were 115.7 males.

The median income for a household in the town was $28,594, and the median income for a family was $35,500. Males had a median income of $31,000 versus $45,083 for females. The per capita income for the town was $9,571. About 14.6% of families and 20.7% of the population were below the poverty line, including 31.7% of those under age 18 and 10.1% of those age 65 or over.

== Notable people ==
- Mariana Klaveno, actress
- Mike Lowry, former governor
