= Telling Secrets =

- Screenplay by: Jennifer Miller
- Directed by: Marvin J. Chomsky
- Starring: Cybill Shepherd
- Theme music composer: Mark Snow
- Country of origin: United States
- Original language: English

Production
- Producers: Jennifer Miller; Dan Witt
- Cinematography: Isidore Mankofsky
- Editor: Anita Brandt Burgoyne
- Running time: 240 minutes
- Production companies: Patchett Kaufman Entertainment; World International Network

Original release
- Network: ABC
- Release: January 17, 1993

Telling Secrets (a.k.a. Contract for Murder) is a 1993 American television film directed by Marvin J. Chomsky and starring Cybill Shepherd.
It is based on the true story of Joy Aylor, who plots the murder of her adulterous husband's mistress.

== Cast ==
- Cybill Shepherd as Faith Kelsey
- Ken Olin as Det. Jay Jensen
- James McCaffrey as Jackson Merrick
- Christopher McDonald as Terry Kelsey
- Gary Grubbs as Det. Ron Taylor
- Andrew Robinson as Dr. Phillip Eckhart
- G.D. Spradlin as Walter Jefferson
- Dylan Walsh as Jesse Graham
- Melora Walters as Karen Blake
- Mary Kay Place as Shelley Jefferson Carp
- Anne Haney as Grace Jefferson
- Lynn Milgrim as Gloria Marsh
- Ann Risley as Sally DeVries
- Nick Young as Highway Patrolman (uncredited)

== Reception ==
David Hiltbrand of People graded the film a B.
