= Ken Olin =

American actor (born 1954)

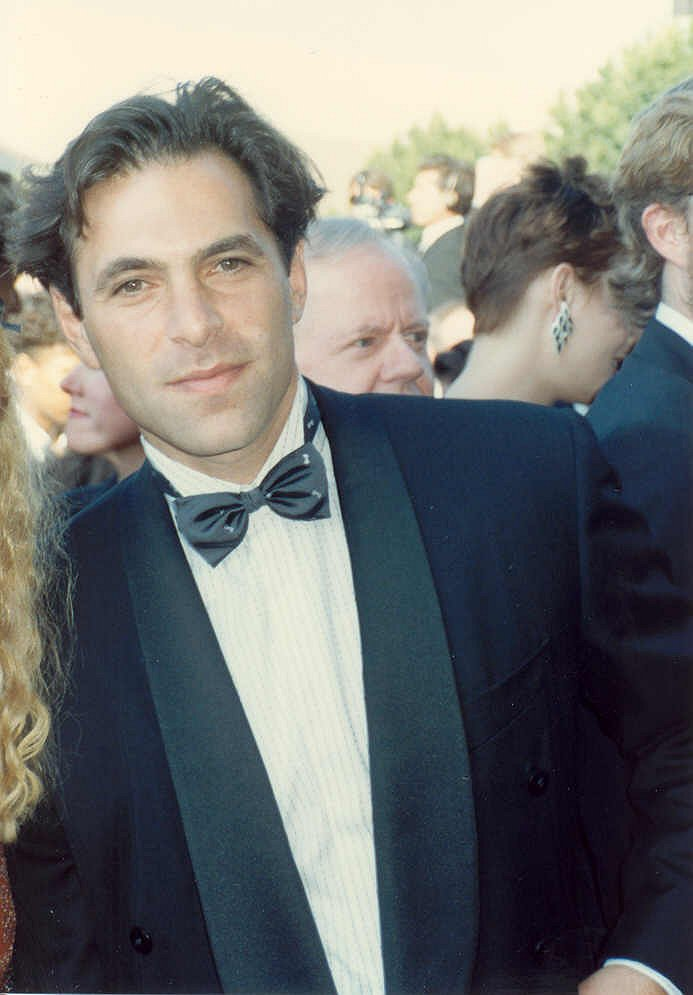
- Olin at the 41st Annual Emmy Awards in September 1989
- Born: Kenneth Edward Olin; July 30, 1954 (age 72); Chicago, Illinois, U.S.
- Education: University of Pennsylvania
- Occupations: Actor; director; producer
- Years active: 1976–present
- Spouse: Patricia Wettig (m. 1982)
- Children: 2

Kenneth Edward Olin (born July 30, 1954) is an American actor, television director, and producer. As an actor, Olin is known for his role as Michael Steadman in the ABC drama series Thirtysomething (1987–1991), for which he received a Golden Globe nomination for Best Actor – Television Series Drama in 1990. Olin later began working behind the scenes, as a director and producer. His credits as a producer include Alias (2001–2006), Brothers & Sisters (2006–2011), and This Is Us (2016–2022). Olin is married to actress Patricia Wettig.

== Career ==
=== Acting ===
Olin made several guest appearances on episodic primetime TV in the late 1970s and early 1980s. His first series regular role was on the short-lived NBC comedy-drama Bay City Blues in 1983. He later joined the cast of NBC police drama Hill Street Blues playing Detective Harry Garibaldi from 1984 to 1985, and from 1985 to 1986 co-starred on the CBS prime time soap opera Falcon Crest as Father Christopher Rossini. Olin also guest-starred on Murder, She Wrote and Hotel before he was cast as Michael Steadman, one of the lead roles in the ABC drama series Thirtysomething. Debuting in 1987, the series received critical acclaim, setting a new bar for realism in the realm of prime-time drama. For his performance, Olin was nominated for the Golden Globe Award for Best Actor – Television Series Drama in 1990.

In 1996, Olin played a leading role in the short-lived CBS crime drama EZ Streets. From 1998 to 1999, he played the leading role in another short-lived CBS series, medical drama L.A. Doctors. He appeared along with wife Patricia Wettig in the 1995 television film Nothing But the Truth, and well as in Telling Secrets (1993) with Cybill Shepherd, The Advocate's Devil (1997) alongside Mariska Hargitay, and Evolution's Child (1999). His film credits include roles in Ghost Story (1981), Queens Logic (1991), and 'Til There Was You (1997).

From 2007 to 2011, Olin had a recurring role opposite wife Patricia Wettig in the ABC drama series Brothers & Sisters. From 2015 to 2017, he had a recurring role in the CBS drama series, Zoo. In 2020, ABC ordered a sequel for Thirtysomething and Olin was set to return alongside Mel Harris, Timothy Busfield and Patricia Wettig; however, the project remains in development limbo.

=== Producing and directing ===
Olin directed six episodes of Thirtysomething. He also directed television movies The Broken Cord (1992), Doing Time on Maple Drive (1992), In Pursuit of Honor (1995) and Phenomenon II (2003), as well as White Fang 2: Myth of the White Wolf (1994) for Buena Vista Pictures. He directed episodes of L.A. Doctors, Judging Amy, Felicity, The West Wing, 23 episodes of Alias, 20 episodes of Brothers & Sisters, Sleepy Hollow, and 20 episodes of This Is Us.

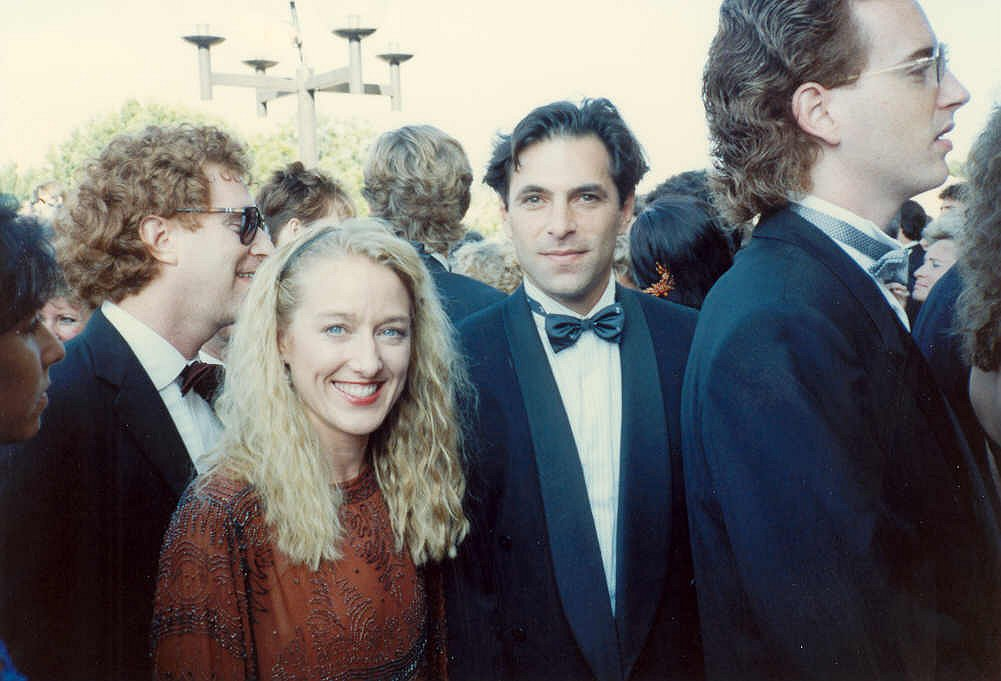
Olin with Patricia Wettig on the red carpet at the 41st Annual Emmy Awards in 1989

Olin has been an executive producer on several television dramas, starting with the ABC action drama Alias (2001-2006). From 2006 to 2011, he was a producer on ABC's family drama Brothers & Sisters, and also appeared on a recurring basis. His wife, Patricia Wettig, was also a regular cast member on the show. In the summer of 1990, Olin directed Wettig in a production of "My Mother Said I Never Should" at the Powerhouse Theatre at Vassar College.

His other credits include Breaking News (2002), The Mob Doctor (2012-2013) and Sleepy Hollow. In 2016, he began producing NBC's family drama This Is Us, which received four Primetime Emmy Award for Outstanding Drama Series nominations during its run.

== Personal life ==
Olin was born to a Jewish family in Chicago, Illinois, the son of a former Peace Corps official and pharmaceutical company owner. He was raised in Highland Park, Illinois. He graduated from The Putney School in Putney, Vermont, in 1972. He then matriculated into the 1976 class at the University of Pennsylvania. He is married to thirtysomething co-star, Patricia Wettig, with whom he has a son, Clifford, and a daughter, Roxanne, who appeared on The City.

== Filmography ==
=== Actor ===
Year	Title	Role	Notes
1978	The Paper Chase	Timothy	"The Man Who Would Be King"
1979	Women at West Point	Board Member	TV movie
1981	Ghost Story	Young Sears James	
1983–1984	Bay City Blues	Rock Padillo	Main role
1984	Flight 90: Disaster on the Potomac	David Frank	TV movie
1984–1985	Hill Street Blues	Detective Harry Garibaldi	Recurring role
1985–1986	Falcon Crest	Father Christopher	Main role
1986	Murder, She Wrote	Perry Revere	"Deadline for Murder"
1986	There Must Be a Pony	Jay Savage	TV movie
1987	Tonight's the Night	Henry Fox	
1987	I'll Take Manhattan	Nat Lammerman	Miniseries
1987	Hotel	Mark Fredricks	"Class of '72"
1987	The Hitchhiker	Steve	"Best Shot"
1987–1991	thirtysomething	Michael Steadman	Main role Nominated – Golden Globe Award for Best Performance by an Actor in a Television Series - Drama (1990); Nominated - Viewers for Quality Television Award for Best Actor in a Quality Drama Series (1991)
1988	A Stoning in Fulham County	Jim Sandler	TV movie
1988	Police Story: Cop Killer	Officer Manny Mandell	TV movie
1990	Goodnight Sweet Wife: A Murder in Boston	Charles Stuart	TV movie
1991	Queens Logic	Ray	
1993	Telling Secrets	Detective Jay Jensen	TV movie
1995	Nothing But the Truth	Doctor Peter Clayman	TV movie
1995	Dead by Sunset	Brad Cunningham	Miniseries
1996–1997	EZ Streets	Detective Cameron Quinn	Main role
1997	'Till There Was You	Gregory	
1997	The Advocate's Devil	Abe Ringel	TV movie
1998–1999	L.A. Doctors	Dr. Roger Cattan	Main role
1999	Evolution's Child	James Mydell	TV movie
1999	Y2K	Nick Cromwell	TV movie
2001	Say Uncle	Unknown role	TV movie
2001–2002	Alias	David McNeil	3 episodes
2002	Breaking News	Richard Sloan	"Pilot"
2005	The Naked Brothers Band: The Movie	Ken Olin	
2007–2011	Brothers & Sisters	David Caplan	Recurring role
2012	Americana	Martin Garano	TV movie
2013	Criminal Minds	Bruce Morrison	Episode: "All That Remains"
2015–2017	Zoo	Professor Robert Oz	Recurring role
2018	The Cloverfield Paradox	Voice role	
2020	Thirtysomething(else)	Michael Steadman	TV movie

=== Director ===
Year	Title	Notes
1989–1991	Thirtysomething: "No Promises" (1989); "Courting Nancy" (1989); "Pilgrims" (1989); "The Other Shoe" (1990); "Guns and Roses" (1990); "Second Look" (1991)	
1998–1999	L.A. Doctors: "Maybe It's You" (1998); "True Believers" (1999); "O Captain, My Captain" (1999); "Forty-Eight Minutes" (1999)	
1992	The Broken Card	TV movie
1992	Doing Time on Maple Drive	TV movie
1994	White Fang 2: Myth of the White Wolf	
1995	In Pursuit of Honor	TV movie
1996	EZ Streets: "Every Picture Tells a Story"	
1999	Judging Amy: "Witch Hunt"	
1999–2000	Felicity: "Family Affairs" (1999); "True Colors" (2000)	
2000	Freaks and Geeks: "The Diary"	
2000	The West Wing: "Take Out the Trash Day" (2000); "The White House Pro-Am" (2000); "In This White House" (2000)	
2001–2005	Alias: "So It Begins" (2001); "Doppleganger" (2001); "Mea Culpa" (2001); "Page 47" (2002); "Q & A" (2002); "Rendezvous" (2002); "The Enemy Walks In" (2002); "The Indicator" (2002); "Passage: Part 1" (2002); "Passage: Part 2" (2002); "Double Agent" (2003); "A Dark Turn" (2003); "Second Double" (2003); "The Two" (2003); "Repercussions" (2003); "Conscious" (2003); "Crossings" (2004); "Hourglass" (2004); "Resurrection" (2004); "Authorized Personnel Only: Part 1" (2005); "Authorized Personnel Only: Part 2" (2005); "The Orphan" (2005); "Prophet Five" (2005)	Nominated - OFTA Television Award for Best Direction in a Drama Series (2002)
2002	Breaking News: "Pilot" (2002); "Hi, Noonan" (2002)	
2003	The Wonderful World of Disney: "Phenomenon II"	
2006	Introducing Lennie Rose	TV movie
2006–2011	Brothers & Sisters: "Patriarchy" (2006); "Family Portrait" (2006); "Mistakes Were Made: Part 2" (2006); "Matriarchy" (2007); "Unaired Pilot" (2007); "Home Front" (2007); "Domestic Issues" (2007); "Prior Commitments" (2008); "Troubled Waters: Part 1" (2009); "Troubled Waters: Part 2" (2009); "Mexico" (2009); "The Road Ahead" (2009); "Breaking the News" (2009); "The Wig Party" (2009); "Time After Time: Part 1" (2010); "Time After Time: Part 2" (2010); "On the Road Again" (2010); "A Righteous Kill" (2010); "Wouldn't It Be Nice" (2011); "Walker Down the Aisle" (2011)	
2008	Eli Stone: "Pilot"	
2012	The Mob Doctor: "Protect and Serve" (2012); "Fluid Dynamics" (2012)	
2013–2014	Sleepy Hollow: "Blood Moon" (2013); "The Sin Eater" (2013); "Bad Blood" (2014); "This Is War" (2014)	
2015	The Slap: "Harry" (2015); "Manolis" (2015); "Connie" (2015); "Ritchie" (2015)	
2015	The Man in the High Castle: "The Illustrated Woman"	
2016–2022	This Is Us: "The Big Three" (2016); "The Big Day" (2017); "Jack Pearson's Son" (2017); "Moonshadow" (2017); "A Father's Advice" (2017); "Still There" (2017); "Number One" (2017); "Number Two" (2017); "The Car" (2018); "The Wedding" (2018); "Nine Bucks" (2018); "Vietnam" (2018); "Sometimes" (2018); "The Beginning Is the End Is the Beginning" (2018); "Songbird Road: Part Two" (2019); "Her" (2019); "Strangers" (2019); "The Dinner and the Date" (2019); "So Long, Marianne" (2019); "New York, New York, New York" (2020); "Strangers: Part Two" (2020); "Forty: Part One" (2020); "Forty: Part Two" (2020); "Honestly" (2020); "In the Room" (2021); "I've Got This" (2021)"; "The Adirondacks" (2021); "The Challenger" (2022); "Katoby" (2022); "The Train" (2022); "Us" (2022)	
2017	The Arrangement: "Pilot"	
2019	Grand Hotel: "Pilot"	
2024-	Tracker: "Klamath Falls" (2024); "Missoula" (2024); "Springland" (2024); "The Storm" (2024); "Out of the Past" (2024); "The Night Movers" (2024); "The Grey Goose" (2025); "The Process" (2025); "The Best Ones" (2026); "Original Parts" (2026)	

=== Producer ===
Year	Title	Notes
1995	Kansas	TV movie; Executive Producer
2002	Breaking News	TV movie; Executive Producer
2002–2006	Alias	Executive Producer; Co-Executive Producer; Nominated – Producers Guild Award for Outstanding Producer of Episodic Television, Drama (2004)
2003	The Wonderful World of Disney	"Phenonmenon II"; Executive Producer
2006	Introducing Lennie Rose	TV movie; Executive Producer
2006	Enemies	Executive Producer
2006–2011	Brothers & Sisters	Executive Producer
2007	Brothers & Sisters: Family Album	TV movie; Executive Producer
2008	Eli Stone	Executive Producer
2012–2013	The Mob Doctor	Executive Producer
2013–2014	Sleepy Hollow	Executive Producer
2016–2022	This Is Us	Executive Producer; Nominated - Black Reel Award for Outstanding Drama Series (as Producer) (2018); Nominated - Primetime Emmy Award for Outstanding Drama Series (as Producer) (2017-2019); Nominated - Producers Guild Award for Outstanding Producer of Episodic Television, Drama (2019)
2017	The Arrangement	Executive Producer
2019	Grand Hotel	Executive Producer
