= Mariana Klaveno =

American actress

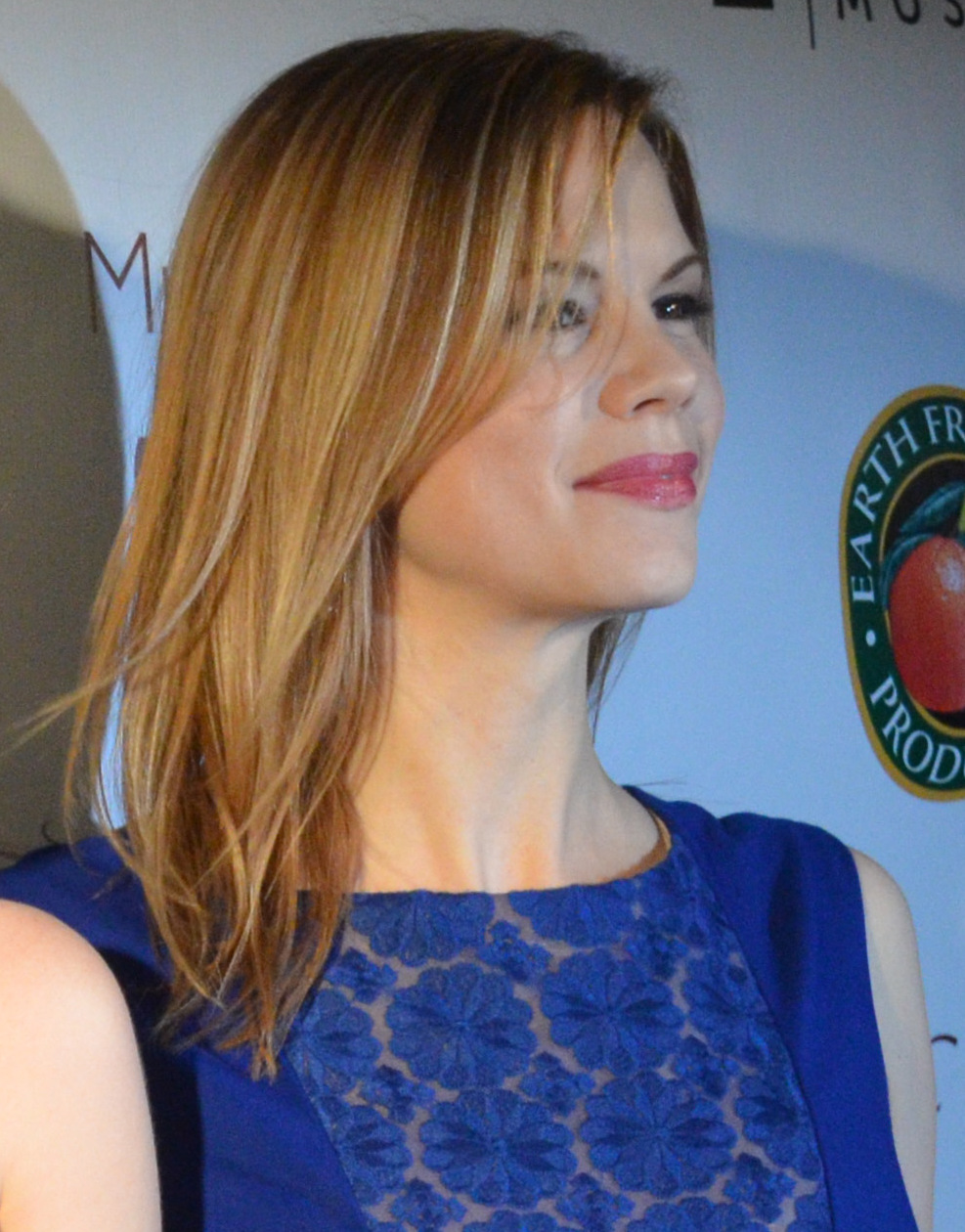
- Klaveno in 2013
- Born: October 25, 1979 (age 46)
- Occupation: Actress
- Years active: 2004–present
- Spouse: Luis A. Patiño (m. 2012)
- Children: 1

Mariana Klaveno (born October 25, 1979) is an American actress best known for her television roles as Lorena Ball (Krasiki) in the HBO series True Blood, as the psychopath Abby in the Lifetime movie While the Children Sleep, and as movie actress Peri Westmore in the Lifetime comedy-drama Devious Maids. In 2014, she starred as Detective Janice Lawrence in the CBS crime drama series Stalker.

== Early life and education ==
Klaveno grew up with three siblings on a family-owned-and-operated farm in Endicott, Washington. She graduated magna cum laude from the University of Washington in Seattle with a B.A. in Theater, studying there with Jon Jory.

== Career ==
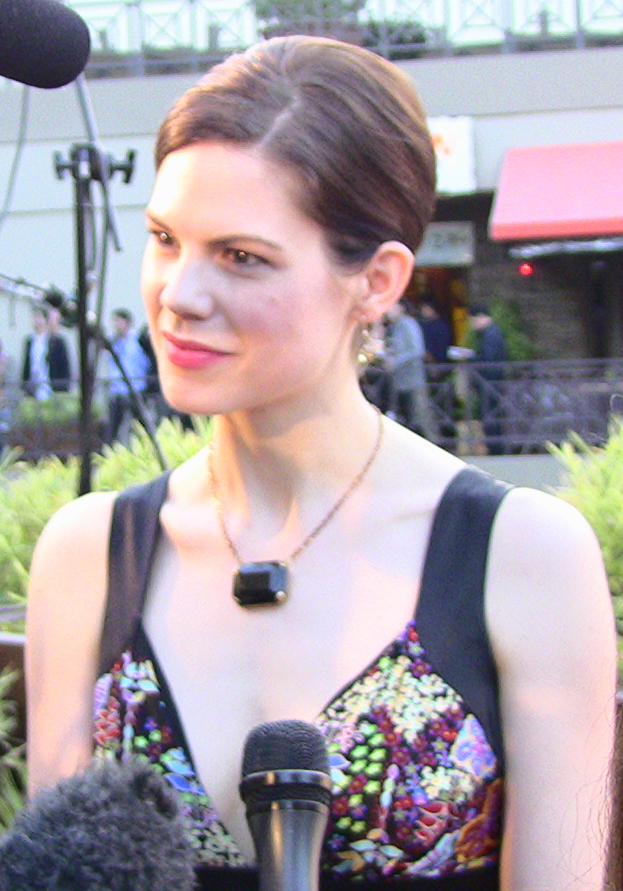
Klaveno in 2010

Klaveno was cast in HBO's True Blood in the role of Lorena, the vampire "maker" of the main character Bill Compton. She first appeared in the fifth episode of season one and became a regular with starring credits in the second half of season two. Klaveno was nominated with the starring cast for the "Outstanding Performance by an Ensemble in a Drama Series" at the 16th Screen Actors Guild Awards in January 2010. She and her costar Stephen Moyer were awarded the "Holy Shit Scene of the Year" award at the Spike 2010 Scream Awards for their scene in season three where Bill turns Lorena's head around 180 degrees while having sex.

Klaveno starred in the Lifetime movie While the Children Sleep in the role of Abby Reed, opposite Gail O'Grady. She guest starred in the television series Standoff, ER, and two episodes of the sixth season of Dexter.

In 2012, Klaveno was cast in the series regular role of Peri Westmore in the Lifetime comedy-drama series Devious Maids. When ABC originally passed on the pilot for Devious Maids, Klaveno was cast as Lily Munster in Mockingbird Lane (NBC's 2012 remake of The Munsters). However, she was not granted release from her contract on Devious Maids as it was still in contention for series order on Lifetime. Klaveno was then replaced by Portia de Rossi. Devious Maids was later ordered to series by Lifetime and premiered on June 23, 2013. Klaveno was a regular cast member for the first season and made guest appearances in the second season. In 2014, she was cast as detective Janice Lawrence in the CBS crime drama series, Stalker, alongside Maggie Q and Dylan McDermott.

== Personal life ==
In 2012, Klaveno married longtime boyfriend Luis A. Patiño, a graduate of UCLA School of Law. They have one child.

== Filmography ==
Film roles
| Year | Title | Role | Notes |
|---|---|---|---|
| 2004 | Gamebox 1.0 | Michelle | Direct-to-video film; as Mariana Kleweno |
| 2013 | No God, No Master | Loise Berger | |
| 2015 | West of Redemption | Becky | |
| 2017 | Aftermath | Eve Sanders | |

Television roles
| Year | Title | Role | Notes |
|---|---|---|---|
| 2004 | Good Girls Don't | Mercedes | Episode: "The Big O" |
| 2005 | Alias | Young Woman | Episode: "A Clear Conscience" |
| 2006 | Laws of Chance | Allison Mayner | Episode: "Original" |
| 2006 | In Justice | Carolyn Hunter | Episode: "Golden Boy" |
| 2006 | Though None Go with Me | Carrie | Television film (Hallmark Channel) |
| 2006 | Standoff | Kari Nichols | Episode: "Partners in Crime" |
| 2007 | While the Children Sleep | Abigail Reed | Television film (Lifetime) aka "The Sitter" |
| 2007 | Final Approach | FBI Agent Harris | Television film (Hallmark Channel) |
| 2007 | K-Ville | Kelly Vert | Episode: "Cobb's Webb" |
| 2008 | ER | Rebecca | Episode: "Under Pressure" |
| 2008–2010, 2012 | True Blood | Lorena Krasiki | Main role (seasons 2–3); recurring role (seasons 1, 5); Satellite Award for Best Cast – Television Series; Nominated – Screen Actors Guild Award for Outstanding Performance by an Ensemble in a Drama Series |
| 2011 | Hawaii Five-0 | Julie Masters | Episode: "E Malama" |
| 2011 | Criminal Minds: Suspect Behavior | Veronica Day | Episode: "The Time is Now" |
| 2011 | Dexter | Carissa Porter | Episodes: "The Angel of Death", "Just Let Go" |
| 2011 | Innocent | Anna Vostick | Television film (TNT) |
| 2013–2016 | Devious Maids | Peri Westmore | Main role (season 1); guest role (season 2–4) |
| 2014–2015 | Stalker | Detective Janice Lawrence | Main role |
| 2016 | Full Circle | Angela Mancuso | Main role (season 3) |
| 2016–2017 | Designated Survivor | Brooke Mathison | 4 episodes (season 1) |
| 2020 | Doom Patrol | Valentina Vostok | Episode: "Space Patrol" |
| 2020 | NCIS | Margo Demint | Episode: "Blood and Treasure" |
| 2022–2024 | Superman & Lois | Lara Lor-Van | Recurring role; 12 episodes |
