= Stalker (TV series) =

2014 American crime drama television series

- Genre: Crime drama; Psychological thriller
- Created by: Kevin Williamson
- Starring: Maggie Q; Dylan McDermott; Mariana Klaveno; Victor Rasuk; Elisabeth Röhm
- Composer: John Frizzell
- Country of origin: United States
- Original language: English
- No. of seasons: 1
- No. of episodes: 20

Production
- Executive producer: Kevin Williamson
- Running time: 42 minutes
- Production companies: Outerbanks Entertainment; Warner Bros. Television

Original release
- Network: CBS
- Release: October 1, 2014 – May 18, 2015

Stalker is an American crime drama television series created by Kevin Williamson that ran for one season on CBS, from October 1, 2014, to May 18, 2015. The series aired on Wednesdays for seventeen episodes and Monday for the last three. The show is about victims of stalking and the detectives of the LAPD's Threat Assessment Unit who investigate the crimes.

On May 8, 2015, CBS canceled Stalker after one season, ending the show on an unresolved cliffhanger.

== Plot summary ==
Det. Jack Larsen is a recent transfer to the LAPD Threat Assessment Unit from the NYPD homicide division, whose actions have gotten him in trouble before. His boss, Lt. Beth Davis, is strong, focused and an expert in the field. With the rest of their team, Det. Ben Caldwell and Det. Janice Lawrence, Larsen and Davis assess the threat level of cases and respond before the stalking and intimidation spirals out of control.

== Cast and characters ==
=== Main ===
- Maggie Q as Lieutenant Beth Davis: A victim of stalking. Born Michelle Webber, Davis changed her name following the stalking-related death of her family. She is now a Lieutenant II in the LAPD and the officer-in-charge of the Threat Assessment Unit (TAU). Introverted, Davis considers her team to be her surrogate family; and, when she is not investigating stalking cases, she is lecturing at college campuses on the subject.
- Dylan McDermott as Detective Jack Larsen: An LAPD Detective II. He recently transferred to the TAU from the NYPD Homicide Division to be near his son. Hired because of his friends "upstairs", Larsen had to earn the respect of Davis and her team, who thought there were more deserving candidates for his position.
- Mariana Klaveno as Detective Janice Lawrence: A Detective II who is second-in-command of Davis' unit.
- Victor Rasuk as Detective Ben Caldwell: A Detective I and a rookie member of the TAU.
- Elisabeth Röhm as ADA Amanda Taylor: The mother of Jack's son. Lovers in New York, Amanda left Jack to start a new life at the Los Angeles District Attorney's Office. She currently serves as the TAU's Deputy D.A.

=== Recurring ===
- Tara Summers as Tracy Wright, Beth's best friend
- Erik Stocklin as Perry Whitley/"Brody", one of Beth's stalkers
- Eion Bailey as Ray, one of Beth's stalkers; he once set a fire that killed her family
- Gabriel Bateman as Ethan Taylor, Amanda and Jack's son
- Warren Kole as Trent Wilkes, LAPD detective and Amanda's boyfriend
- Mira Sorvino as Vicki Gregg, an FBI agent who replaces Beth as the interim commander of the TAU
- Chelsea Harris as Belle

== Episodes ==
No.	Title	Directed by	Written by	Original release date	U.S. viewers (millions)
1	"Pilot"	Liz Friedlander	Kevin Williamson	October 1, 2014	9.05
Detective Jack Larsen starts his first day with the LA TAU team under Lt. Beth Davis. The team investigates a fire-setting stalker and a student claiming self-defense against Perry. Jack secretly watches his ex, Amanda, and their son Ethan. The episode ends with Perry following Beth home.
2	"Whatever Happened to Baby James?"	Liz Friedlander	Sanford Golden & Karen Wyscarver	October 8, 2014	8.17
Hannah babysits her brother Thomas, who turns out to be the real target of a stalker, not her. The TAU investigates and rules out Barnes, discovering a grieving neighbor connected to Thomas. Perry confronts Beth again, while Jack is warned by Amanda to leave L.A. within two weeks or face exposure. Perry is shown following Beth and contacting one of her friends.
3	"Manhunt"	Bronwen Hughes	Brett Mahoney	October 15, 2014	7.87
Jack questions why Beth seems to dislike him while the TAU investigates a sniper attack at Cara’s wedding. Suspicion shifts from her ex-husband to her father’s enemy, Silas Martin. Jack learns he got the TAU job through a favor, not merit, and Beth acknowledges his luck. Amanda reminds him to leave L.A. soon, and Jack discovers Trent is her boyfriend.
4	"Phobia"	Roxann Dawson	Heather Zuhlke	October 22, 2014	7.37
The TAU team hunts Chris Powell, a stalker who exploits women’s phobias, and Jack uses Powell’s fear of heights to save a victim. Meanwhile, Perry gathers personal information on Beth and has drawn disturbing sketches of her. Jack and Janice begin a romance after he removes reminders of Amanda and Ethan.
5	"The Haunting"	Brad Turner	Kevin Williamson	October 29, 2014	7.36
A college student is stalked in a supposedly haunted house, leading the TAU team to investigate paranormal claims and a hidden room where Jack is attacked. Meanwhile, Perry learns Beth’s real name, Michelle Webber, and follows her, revealing knowledge of her tragic past. Beth confirms a patient from a psychiatric institution is still confined. Jack is warned by Amanda to leave L.A. but secretly connects with his son, Ethan.
6	"Love Is a Battlefield"	Omar Madha	Dewayne Jones	November 5, 2014	7.34
Andrea Brown’s home is vandalized and attacked, and the TAU investigates suspects including her ex-husband, his girlfriend, and an artist she hired. Andrea’s story unravels as the team uncovers the truth behind the attacks. Meanwhile, Jack faces pressure from Amanda to leave L.A. over a past incident but negotiates a chance to stay if he avoids Ethan.
7	"Fanatic"	Kevin Bray	Tamara Jaron	November 12, 2014	7.01
Actress Nina Pressly is stalked again, and the TAU investigates suspects including a former obsessive fan and a paparazzo with inside information from Nina’s sister. The real attacker is revealed to be a mentally unstable man manipulated by his mother. Meanwhile, Perry steals Beth’s personal data and breaks into her home. Beth receives a mysterious letter about the house fire, though the psychiatric patient she suspects could not have sent it.
8	"Skin"	Fred Toye	Corey Evett & Matt Partney	November 19, 2014	7.98
Mark Evans Richards is targeted after his extremist past is exposed, and the TAU investigates threats against his family, eventually suspecting a neighbor rather than his former associate. A bomb nearly kills his son, escalating tensions. Meanwhile, Trent realizes Ethan is Jack’s son, complicating matters with Amanda. Beth receives a teddy bear identical to one from her tragic house fire, deepening the mystery around her past.
9	"Crazy for You"	Liz Friedlander	Dawn DeNoon	November 26, 2014	8.26
The TAU investigates threats against psychiatrist Adam Lewis, initially suspecting a former unstable patient but discovering the real culprit is Jason Walker, who framed Lewis and planned to stage his suicide. Meanwhile, Beth questions how her personal information was leaked and secretly follows Tracy. She sees Tracy meeting Perry and later breaks into his apartment, finding disturbing drawings.
10	"A Cry for Help"	Jeff T. Thomas	Heather Zuhlke	December 3, 2014	7.47
The TAU investigates violent attacks by Cory James, who targeted former classmates connected to a past sexual assault. They arrest her and promise justice against her rapist. Meanwhile, Beth reveals Tracy’s boyfriend is actually Perry, a dangerous stalker from her past. Perry confronts Beth and threatens her with knowledge about Ray and the house fire that killed her family.
11	"Tell All"	David Rodriguez	Sean Hennen	December 10, 2014	7.25
The TAU investigates stalking tied to Stella’s unpublished tell-all book and traces the disappearances back to her ex-husband Tom. Meanwhile, Beth seeks Janice’s help to provoke Perry into making a mistake, leading to his arrest. Ethan approaches Jack, and Amanda eventually allows Jack to visit his son.
12	"Secrets and Lies"	David Straiton	Sanford Golden & Karen Wyscarver	January 14, 2015	7.87
The TAU investigates a threatening clown package sent to Mayor Will Hayes, exploring suspects linked to his affair with an escort and potential family tensions. Meanwhile, Beth seeks Amanda’s help with Perry, who is offered probation. After making bail, Perry disappears and is later seen visiting Ray in a mental facility, revealing their shared agenda.
13	"The News"	Liz Friedlander	Dewayne Jones	January 21, 2015	8.07
John Bardo is stalked, and his new girlfriend is revealed to be a former obsessive fan who takes his rival hostage before being stopped. Meanwhile, Perry arranges Ray’s release, and Ray contacts Beth, threatening to see her soon. Ben learns about Beth’s past identity as Michelle. The TAU team gathers at Beth’s home to support her.
14	"My Hero"	Kevin Bray	Tamara Jaron	January 28, 2015	8.34
Dave proposes to Nicole, but he is later burned to death, leading the TAU to investigate jealous exes and the parents of a child who died under Nicole’s watch. Clues about a red truck and Nicole’s past rescue complicate the case. Meanwhile, Amanda invites Jack to dinner with Ethan, ending things with Trent. Jack also supports Beth during her growing crisis.
15	"Lost and Found"	Rob Seidenglanz	Corey Evett and Matt Partney	February 4, 2015	7.35
Coach Baker is threatened, and the TAU uncovers a web of high school drama and hidden family secrets behind the attacks. The real issue involves deception about ages and parentage among the students. Meanwhile, Perry and Ray grow closer, but Ray asserts dominance. Ray then plans to reach Beth by targeting her team.
16	"Salvation"	Liz Friedlander	Danny Tolli	February 11, 2015	7.64
Isabelle reports threats from her ex-boyfriend, leading the TAU to investigate a cult called “Celestial” and its leader. Her neighbor Lucy is revealed to be involved with the group. Meanwhile, Perry and Ray plan to isolate Beth by targeting her team. Ray begins their attack by assaulting Amanda.
17	"Fun and Games"	Jeff T. Thomas	Kevin Williamson	February 18, 2015	6.74
Ray kidnaps Tracy, kills an investigator, and lures Beth into a trap. Perry tries to intervene but is beaten to death by Ray. Tracy is rescued, but Ray attacks Beth, shooting Ben and abducting her. Beth wakes in a car trunk next to Perry’s corpse as the TAU rushes to save Ben.
18	"The Woods"	Fred Toye	Sean Hennen	April 27, 2015	5.70
Beth is kidnapped by Ray and taken to a remote cabin while Ben remains in critical condition. The FBI takes over, suspecting she’s been taken out of state. Jack and Janice independently track Ray and locate him in Ojai, California, rushing to rescue Beth. Meanwhile, Ben awakens in the hospital.
19	"Love Hurts"	Hanelle Culpepper	Sanford Golden & Karen Wyscarver	May 11, 2015	6.37
Pam Tyler is stalked and attacked, leading Janice to suspect a serial killer may be at large, targeting members of an addiction support group. Beth considers her future in the LAPD.
20	"Love Kills"	Liz Friedlander	Kevin Williamson & Dewayne Jones	May 18, 2015	6.79
Beth, Jack, Vicki and the rest of the TAU team continue their search for a serial killer, and Vicki learns some startling information about her ex-husband.

== Critical reception ==
Stalker received negative reviews from critics. The review aggregator Rotten Tomatoes reported that 20% of critics have given the show a positive review based on 49 reviews, with an average rating of 3.19/10. The site's critics consensus reads, "Stalker is chock full of perverted subjects and ugly storylines, making it hard to watch even for those who like to watch." Maureen Ryan of The Huffington Post called it "exploitative, misogynist trash". At Metacritic, the series premiere garnered a score of 17 out of 100 based on 24 critics, indicating "overwhelming dislike". The show also received negative reviews from Variety, USA Today, and The A.V. Club.

=== Awards and nominations ===
In 2015, Stalker's Dylan McDermott was nominated for a People's Choice Award for Favorite Actor in a New TV Series.

=== Ratings ===
Time slot (ET)	No. of episodes	Premiered		Ended		TV Season	Rank	Ratings	Viewers (in millions)
Time slot (ET)	No. of episodes	Date	Viewers (in millions)	Date	Viewers (in millions)	TV Season	Rank	Ratings	Viewers (in millions)
Wednesday 10:00 p.m. (October 1, 2014 – February 18, 2015); Monday 9:00 p.m. (April 27, 2015 – May 18, 2015)	20	October 1, 2014	9.05	May 18, 2015	6.79	2014–15	#43	2.3	10.13

== Broadcast ==
Stalker was picked up by several broadcasters outside the United States. The Belgian station Vier airs Stalker as well every Sunday night as a part of their crime night. In South Africa, the series premiered on October 22, 2014, and airs on M-Net Edge on Wednesdays. It premiered in the UK and Ireland on November 10, 2014, on Sky Living and airs on Mondays. In Romania, it airs every Wednesday on Diva. In New Zealand the series premiered on TVNZ on January 12, 2015. The series premiered in Australia on Nine Network on April 12, 2015. The show also airs in France, on TF1. In Japan, Stalker is shown on cable/satellite channel AXN. In Greece, the series premiered in September 2016, on Star Channel.
