= Thomas Curtis (actor) =

American actor

- Born: Thomas Wayne Curtis; April 20, 1991 (age 35)
- Occupation: Actor
- Years active: 2000–2010

Thomas Wayne Curtis (born April 20, 1991) is an American actor. Curtis has starred in the 2000 movie The Cactus Kid, and appeared in Sweet Home Alabama, Red Dragon, The Chumscrubber and Hansel & Gretel. He also starred alongside Academy Award winning actress Charlize Theron in the critically acclaimed film North Country in 2005. His latest acting role is as "Tom Olsen" in the TV series While the Children Sleep.

== Filmography ==
=== Feature films ===
Year	Film	Role
2002	Sweet Home Alabama	Young Jake
2002	Hansel and Gretel	Andrew
2002	The Outsider	Benjo Yoder
2005	North Country	Sammy Aimes
2005	The Chumscrubber	Charlie Bratley
2010	Freeway Killer	Billy Pugh

=== Television ===
Year	Title	Role	Other notes
2002	CSI: Miami	Timmy Caplin	Episode: "Slaughterhouse"
