= Evolution's Child =

- Based on: Toys of Glass by Martin Booth
- Written by: Walter Klenhard
- Directed by: Jeffrey Reiner
- Starring: Ken Olin; Taylor Nichols; Heidi Swedberg; Jacob Smith
- Music by: Vinny Golia
- Country of origin: United States
- Original language: English

Production
- Producer: John V. Stuckmeyer
- Cinematography: Feliks Parnell
- Editor: David Rennie
- Running time: 80 minutes
- Production companies: Great Falls Productions; Nightstar Productions

Original release
- Network: USA Network
- Release: October 22, 1999

Evolution's Child is a 1999 American sci-fi fantasy drama television film directed by Jeffrey Reiner and aired on USA Network. Its teleplay, written by Walter Klenhard, was based on the 1995 book Toys of Glass by Martin Booth. The film starred Ken Olin, Taylor Nichols, Heidi Swedberg, and Jacob Smith.

== Tagline ==
He never knew his father. Because his father died 3,000 years ago.

== Plot ==
After a preserved Bronze Age man is found in Colorado, a woman is mistakenly inseminated with semen extracted from him for DNA research. Years later the child begins to exhibit strange abilities.

== Cast ==
- Ken Olin as James Mydell
- Taylor Nichols as Brian Cordell
- Heidi Swedberg as Elaine Cordell
- Jacob Smith as Adam Cordell
- Susan Gibney as Beth Lider
- Jerry Wasserman as Agent Edmunds
- Christopher Gaze as Dr. Lindenhan
- Matthew Nielsen as Baby Adam
- Wendy Van Riesen as Molly
- Robert Moloney as Craig
- Kirsten Alter as Dr. Bantrow
- Kevin McNulty as Dr. Collard
- Simon Longmore as Bystander
- Deryl Hayes as Detective Sheridan
- Robert Saunders as Bob
- Laura Drummond as Woman
- Jenny Mitchell as Teacher
- Mark Brandon as TV reporter
- D. Neil Mark as Trooper
- Santino Barile as Bronze Age man
- Sara McIntyre as Nurse
- Paul Batten as Dr. Rhodes
- Linnea Sharples as Business woman

== Awards and nominations ==
Year	Award	Category	Nominee	Result
2000	21st Young Artist Awards	Best Performance in a TV Movie or Pilot: Young Actor Age Ten or Under	Jacob Smith	Nominated
