= Road Rage (film) =

1999 American made-for-television film

- Written by: Brian L. Ross; David Taylor
- Directed by: Deran Sarafian
- Starring: Yasmine Bleeth; Jere Burns
- Music by: Joel McNeely

Production
- Running time: 92 minutes

Original release
- Network: NBC
- Release: October 3, 1999

Road Rage is a 1999 American made-for-TV movie, a thriller starring Yasmine Bleeth and Jere Burns. It was first broadcast on NBC on October 3, 1999.

== Plot ==
Ellen Carson (Yasmine Bleeth) is a real estate agent who inadvertently cuts off a delivery truck driver while changing lanes on the freeway to hurry home. The truck driver turns out to be a disturbed man named Eddie Madden (Jere Burns), who proceeds to chase after Ellen in an effort to run her off the road. Ellen in fear calls the 1-800 number on the back of his truck and lodges a complaint, which causes Eddie to lose his job, and he (being a grieving husband and father who earlier lost his family to a car accident) sets out to destroy Ellen's family and soon becomes fixated on Ellen and her teenage stepdaughter Cynthia (Alana Austin) and plots to have them as replacement family, by removing the head of the house, Ellen's husband and Cynthia's father Jim Carson (John Wesley Shipp).

== Cast ==
- Yasmine Bleeth as Ellen Carson
- Jere Burns as Eddie Madden
- Alana Austin as Cynthia Carson
- John Wesley Shipp as Jim Carson
- Michael Dobson as Bill, Cop #1
- Jenica Bergere as Nina
- Doug Abrahams as Steve Boyd
- Nathaniel DeVeaux as Sergeant Ganz
- Roger Barnes as Wilson
- Robyn Driscoll as Detective Jones
- Donald Fong as Dry Cleaner
- Viv Leacock as Ward
- J.J. McColl as Tess
- Maxine Miller as Mrs. Tate
- Michelle Morgan as Rebecca
- Linsea O'Shea as Donna
- James Ralph as Cop #2
- Pauline Roberts as Julie
- J. Douglas Stewart as Mr. Breen
