= Jacob Smith (actor) =

American actor

- Occupation: Actor
- Years active: 1997–2006

Jacob Smith is an American former actor. He began his career as a young child, making several guest appearances on popular TV shows before being cast as Owen Salinger on Party of Five, a role he held for two years. After the series' end, Smith went on to appear in Phantom of the Megaplex, a Disney Channel Original Movie, in 2000 and then in Cheaper by the Dozen and its sequel, Cheaper by the Dozen 2, in 2003 and 2005, respectively.

== Life and career ==
Smith began acting at age seven, appearing on several television series, including Walker, Texas Ranger, Party of Five, and Step by Step. During this period, he also starred in the made-for-television films Evolution's Child and the Disney Channel production Phantom of the Megaplex.

Smith was cast as Hansel, opposite Taylor Momsen's Gretel, in the 2002 film version of Hansel and Gretel, which received a limited theatrical release in October 2002. He was subsequently cast as one of twelve children in the family comedy Cheaper by the Dozen. In 2004, he had a minor role in the film Troy and appeared on the television series Without a Trace. He went on to reprise his role of Jake Baker in Cheaper by the Dozen 2, which was released in December 2005.

== Filmography ==
Year	Film	Role	Other notes
1998	Small Soldiers	Timmy Fimple	
1998	Nowhere to Go	Steven	
1999	Evolution's Child	Adam Cordell	TV movie
2000	Phantom of the Megaplex	Brian Riley	
2002	Dragonfly	Ben	
2002	Hansel and Gretel	Hansel	
2003	Cheaper by the Dozen	Jake Baker	
2004	Troy	Messenger Boy	
2005	Cheaper by the Dozen 2	Jake Baker	
Television
Year	Title	Role	Notes
1998–2000	Party of Five	Owen Salinger	40 episodes (Seasons 5–6)
Guest Appearances
Year	Title	Role	Episode
1997	Walker, Texas Ranger	Ross Sloan	Iceman
1997	Step by Step	Kenny/Kid at Party	Dream Lover
1998	Hyperion Bay	Boy on Tour	Static
2001	Becker	Jared	Elder Hostile
2001	Once and Again	Jamie Blue	Pictures
2002	Once and Again	Jamie Blue	One Step (Parent) Backward
2002	Family Law	Justin Rollins	Blood and Water
2002	Push, Nevada	Young Jim	The Letter of the Law
2003	Miracles	Tommy Ferguson	The Ferguson Syndrome
2003	Miracles	Tommy Ferguson	Little Miss Lost
2003	Miracles	Tommy Ferguson	Paul Is Dead
2004	Without a Trace	Matt Palmer	Bait
2006	Secrets of a Small Town	Peter Rhodes	Pilot
