= The Retrievers =

2001 film

- DVD Cover
- Written by: Larry Ketron
- Directed by: Paul Schneider
- Starring: Robert Hays; Mel Harris; Alana Austin; Taylor Emerson
- Music by: Joseph Conlan
- Country of origin: United States
- Original language: English

Production
- Producer: Jonathan Bogner
- Cinematography: Don E. FauntLeRoy
- Editor: Andrew Cohen
- Running time: 95 minutes
- Production companies: Animal Planet; Tag Entertainment

Original release
- Release: July 30, 2001

The Retrievers is a 2001 television film starring Robert Hays, Mel Harris, Alan Rachins, Alana Austin, Taylor Emerson, Betty White and Robert Wagner. It was directed by Paul Schneider and written by Larry Ketron.

== Plot ==
A family adopts a stray golden retriever, Pilot, who gives birth to six puppies. Though the family grow close, they decide to give the puppies away after weaning. However, Pilot is determined to recover them.

== Cast ==
- Robert Hays as Tom Lowry
- Mel Harris as Karen Lowry
- Alana Austin as Liz Lowry
- Taylor Emerson as Widdy Lowry
- Alan Rachins as Ed
- Betty White as Mrs. Krisper
- Robert Wagner as Durham Haysworth
- Kurt Johnson as Marcel

== Reception ==
The film achieved a rating of 1.89 million, a record for Animal Planet.
