= Hansel and Gretel (2002 film) =

Fantasy film by Gary J. Tunnicliffe

- Directed by: Gary J. Tunnicliffe
- Written by: Gary J. Tunnicliffe; Timothy Dolan; Jonathan Bogner
- Based on: Hansel and Gretel by Brothers Grimm
- Produced by: Steve Austin; Jonathan Bogner
- Starring: Delta Burke; Howie Mandel; Gerald McRaney; Lynn Redgrave; Alana Austin; Thomas Curtis; Dakota Fanning; Jacob Smith; Taylor Momsen; Tom Arnold; Bobcat Goldthwait; Sinbad
- Cinematography: Brian Baugh
- Edited by: Andrew Cohen
- Music by: Rusty Andrews; Bob Mothersbaugh
- Production companies: Tag Entertainment; Innovation Film Group
- Distributed by: Helkon SK (Germany); Warner Home Video (American Direct-to-video)
- Release date: October 18, 2002
- Running time: 89 minutes
- Country: United States
- Language: English
- Budget: $10 million
- Box office: $154,642

Hansel and Gretel is a 2002 American fantasy comedy film based on the fairy tale of the same name by Brothers Grimm. The film is directed by Gary J. Tunnicliffe and produced by Steve Austin and Jonathan Bogner. Jacob Smith and Taylor Momsen portray the eponymous characters, alongside Howie Mandel, Alana Austin, Delta Burke, Tom Arnold, Lynn Redgrave, Bobcat Goldthwait, and Sinbad. The film follows siblings Hansel and Gretel as they try to escape from the Magic Forest and a witch's gingerbread house with the help of the Sandman and the Wood Fairy. The film received negative reviews from critics.

== Plot ==
In a modern home, two children named Andrew and Katie are about to go to bed during a thunderstorm. They ask their father to read them a story to help them sleep. The father finds the fairy tale of Hansel and Gretel and begins to read it.

Hansel and Gretel are living with their father and their wicked stepmother in a very tiny shack near a forest. Since they are very poor, the father decides to sell Hansel and Gretel's late biological mother's necklace, but the Stepmother steals it intending on selling it herself so she can become wealthy. The next day, the stepmother abandons the children in the Magic Forest.

Afterward, Hansel and Gretel go looking for food and get tricked into going to a troll's cave. They are then saved by the Sandman, whom they befriend. They also let Wood Fairy free, whom they also befriend. Throughout the story the Sandman and the fairy are always bickering, which causes problems at times.

During the evening when the Sandman and Wood Fairy went out to get some food for the kids, Hansel and Gretel wander off and find a gingerbread house after a windstorm. An elderly woman that lives there invites them in, feeds them, and puts them to bed. When they wake up the next morning, a raven comes to the window to tell them that the woman is actually an evil and ravenous witch who eats children. The Witch walks into the room, locks Hansel in a cage, and makes Gretel cook and Hansel eat regularly to fatten him up. Later on, Gretel breaks a mirror and the Witch becomes a green-skinned crone. The Sandman and Wood Fairy break into the gingerbread house and put the Witch in the oven, killing her. The Wood Fairy ran out with Gretel, and the Sandman gets fat Hansel out by rolling him away. The father finds them and they do not worry about the Stepmother, who had gone to the Troll's house, where the Troll then abandoned her after she made him cook and clean for her.

The scene returns to the bedroom of the two kids and their father who says goodnight and leaves the room. The Sandman, the Boogeyman, and the Troll drop by, say hello to the children, and take the Hansel and Gretel book. They explain to the children that they are real, which is how the Brothers Grimm were inspired to write the story. The Sandman sprinkles the children with his sleep dust and it is shown that the Stepmother found the gingerbread house and moved in.

== Cast ==
- Taylor Momsen as Gretel
- Jacob Smith as Hansel
- Delta Burke as Hansel & Gretel's Stepmother
- Howie Mandel as Sandman
- Alana Austin as Wood Fairy
- Gerald McRaney as Hansel & Gretel's Father
- Lynn Redgrave as Woman / Witch
- Dakota Fanning as Katie
- Thomas Curtis as Andrew
- Daniel Roebuck as Andrew & Katie's Father

=== Voice cast ===
- Tom Arnold as Boogeyman
- Bobcat Goldthwait as Troll
- Sinbad as Raven

== Reception ==
The film has a 0% "Rotten" score on Rotten Tomatoes. IMDb gave it a 4.2 out of a possible 10. It performed poorly at the box office.

== See also ==
- List of films about witchcraft
