= L.A. Doctors =

1998 American medical drama series

- Genre: Medical drama
- Created by: John Lee Hancock
- Starring: Ken Olin; Matt Craven; Rick Roberts; Sheryl Lee
- Theme music composer: Jeff Rona
- Composer: Jeff Beal
- Country of origin: United States
- Original language: English
- No. of seasons: 1
- No. of episodes: 24

Production
- Executive producers: Michelle Ashford; John Lee Hancock; Mark Johnson
- Producer: Ken Olin
- Running time: 60 minutes
- Production companies: Johnson/Hancock Productions; CBS Productions; Columbia TriStar Television

Original release
- Network: CBS
- Release: September 21, 1998 – May 10, 1999

L.A. Doctors is an American medical drama television series set in a Los Angeles primary care practice. It was produced by Johnson/Hancock Productions, CBS Productions and Columbia TriStar Television and ran on CBS from September 21, 1998 to May 10, 1999. It replaced Brooklyn South after its cancellation in May 1998.

== Premise ==
Four Los Angeles doctors run a practice in this drama that focuses as much on the problems in the American medical system as it does on the patients.

== Cast ==
- Ken Olin as Dr. Roger Cattan
- Matt Craven as Dr. Tim Lonner
- Rick Roberts as Dr. Evan Newman
- Sheryl Lee as Dr. Sarah Church
- Deirdre O'Connell as Suzanne Blum

== Cancellation ==
The series was scheduled opposite ABC's Monday Night Football and NBC's Dateline Monday, and struggled in the ratings, leading up to the show's cancellation in May 1999, after ranking 56th for the season.

== Episodes ==
No.	Title	Directed by	Written by	Original release date	Prod. code	Viewers (millions)
1	"Pilot"	Gary Fleder	John Lee Hancock	September 21, 1998	100	13.18
Young doctors (Ken Olin, Matt Craven, Rick Roberts) open a medical practice where patients come before profit; with Sheryl Lee.
2	"Under the Radar"	Dean Parisot	John Lee Hancock	September 28, 1998	101	10.00
Tim and Roger go after marijuana for a patient with advanced AIDS; a woman hides the fact that she has lupus from her new employer.
3	"A Prayer for the Lying"	Peter Markle	Michelle Ashford & Greg Walker	October 5, 1998	102	9.54
Roger buys a celebrity-laden client list; a teen refuses treatment on religious grounds; with Tom Arnold.
4	"Fear of Flying"	David Carson	Tim Kring	October 12, 1998	104	9.02
Evan and Sarah find a makeshift medical facility for illegal aliens; Roger's stepmother needs bypass surgery; Tim vents anxiety on a claims adjuster.
5	"Whither Thou Goest"	Graham Yost	Emily Whitesell	October 19, 1998	105	9.87
Evan learns Roger is treating Kelly; a technician blackmails Tim; Sarah's husband is increasingly aloof.
6	"Classic Evan"	Gary Fleder	Andrew Lipsitz	October 26, 1998	106	9.18
Tim and Julie may lose the twins to their biological mother; Evan treats a drug-addled radio personality.
7	"Maybe It's You"	Ken Olin	Grey Walker	November 2, 1998	107	10.75
Roger confronts a man he suspects of spouse abuse; a couple breaks up over Viagra; chicken soup and a cork.
8	"The Code"	David Carson	Marilyn Osborn	November 9, 1998	108	11.84
Tim helps a mother addicted to heroin; Roger confronts a dangerous plastic surgeon.
9	"What About Bob?"	Scott Brazil	Tim Kring	November 16, 1998	109	10.87
Sarah delivers two babies simultaneously; Roger identifies with a homeless man; Tim encounters a racist.
10	"Nate Expectations"	Nicole Holofcener	Gardner Stern	November 30, 1998	103	9.96
Parents abort an unborn child after learning it is male; seeking a nontraditional cure, Tim accompanies a terminal patient to Mexico.
11	"Leap of Faith"	Reynaldo Villalobos	Emily Whitesell, story by Emily Whitesell & Harlan Levine	December 7, 1998	110	10.19
Sarah is happy to be pregnant; Roger has a new relationship; Evan and Kelly date.
12	"Endless Bummer"	Gary Fleder	Gardner Stern & Greg Walker	December 14, 1998	111	10.33
Roger's old flame has a brain tumor; Tim wants to donate bone marrow to a cancer patient.
13	"Been There, Done That"	Rick Bota	Andrew Litsitz	January 11, 1999	112	10.21
Teenage girl abuses steroids; suicide attempt; crooked business manager.
14	"Just Duet"	Joe Napolitano	Greg Walker	January 18, 1999	113	13.49
Sarah searches for a dying patient's mysteriously absent husband (Robin Williams).
15	"True Believers"	Ken Olin	Tim Kring	January 25, 1999	114	10.39
A boy has a flesh-eating bacteria; a patient says he was abducted by aliens.
16	"Baby, It's Cold Outside"	Stephen Gyllenhaal	Gary Glasberg	February 8, 1999	115	10.61
A sniper traps Dr. Newman and wounded children inside a classroom; an African-American mother delivers a white baby.
17	"Immaculate Deception"	Joe Napolitano	Bonnie Mark	February 15, 1999	116	10.88
Sarah's patient falls victim to rape; Roger helps a drug addict.
18	"Denial"	Rick Rosenthal	Samantha Howard Corbin	March 1, 1999	117	10.01
Tim helps a dying 3-year-old boy; Evan's ex-wife wants to move; obsessive-compulsive disorder.
19	"Where the Rubber Meets the Road"	John Lee Hancock	John Lee Hancock & Greg Walker	March 8, 1999	118	9.68
The father of a patient sues Roger for malpractice; Evan's patient wants to die.
20	"The Life Lost in Living"	Rick Rosenthal	Andrew Lipsitz	March 22, 1999	119	8.29
Roger treats a death row inmate with a brain tumor; Sarah's father has palsy.
21	"O Captain, My Captain"	Ken Olin	Emily Whitesell	April 19, 1999	120	9.51
A patients-rights activist (Vanessa Williams) questions Evan's professional judgment.
22	"Que Sera, Sarah"	Scott Brazil	Gardner Stern & Greg Walker	April 26, 1999	121	9.96
Tim and Leanne clash over a mentally impaired patient's wish to have a baby; guest Dennis Rodman.
23	"Every Picture Tells a Story"	Alex Graves	Kimberly Costello	May 3, 1999	122	9.28
Sarah and Evan's romance blossoms; Roger thinks his friend was poisoned; Susann's boyfriend has hepatitis C.
24	"Forty-Eight Minutes"	Ken Olin	Michelle Ashford & Tim Kring	May 10, 1999	123	11.30
The doctors are involved in a massive, multicar pileup while on their way to a medical convention and try to attend to the injured amid chaos.

== Awards and nominations ==
The series won the 1999 People's Choice Award for Favorite New Dramatic Television Series.
