= Ink (TV series) =

- Genre: Sitcom
- Created by: Jeffrey Lane
- Starring: Ted Danson; Mary Steenburgen; Alana Austin; Christine Ebersole; Saul Rubinek; Charlie Robinson; Jenica Bergere; Jonathan Katz
- Composer: W.G. Snuffy Walden
- Country of origin: United States
- Original language: English
- No. of seasons: 1
- No. of episodes: 22

Production
- Executive producers: Diane English; Ted Danson; Mary Steenburgen
- Producer: John Amodeo
- Camera setup: Multi-camera
- Running time: 22 minutes
- Production companies: Shukovsky English Entertainment; Addis/Wechsler Television; DreamWorks Television

Original release
- Network: CBS
- Release: October 21, 1996 – May 19, 1997

Ink is an American television sitcom which aired on CBS from October 21, 1996, to May 19, 1997, that starred real-life husband and wife Ted Danson and Mary Steenburgen as divorced newspaper journalists, allegedly inspired by the film His Girl Friday.

After Diane English was brought in, the show was drastically changed with the additional three taped episodes scrapped. Ink was filmed at the soundstages of CBS Studio City in the Studio City area of Los Angeles. Outdoor scenes were usually shot at the small backlot streets of the same studio. The show was also produced by Danson and Steenburgen.

== Cast ==
- Ted Danson as Michael Patrick "Mike" Logan, The New York Sun's prominent, egoistical star columnist. Charming, opinionated and fiercely protective of his independence, Mike clashes with his ex-wife when she becomes his boss.
- Mary Steenburgen as Kate Montgomery, an accomplished former foreign correspondent appointed managing editor of the Sun. Intelligent, determined and authoritative, she must supervise a newsroom that includes her former husband.
- Alana Austin as Abigail "Abby" Logan, Mike and Kate's teenage daughter. Abby's personal life and her parents' disagreements provided the series with family-centered storylines beyond the newspaper.
- Christine Ebersole as Belinda Carhardt, the Sun's glamorous society columnist. Sophisticated, outspoken and fond of gossip, Belinda brought a sharp, theatrical personality to the newsroom.
- Saul Rubinek as Alan Mesnick, the Sun's financial reporter. Neurotic, socially awkward and often anxious, Alan was frequently the source of workplace comedy.
- Charlie Robinson as Ernie Trainor, the Sun's seasoned newspaper reporter with an old-school newspaperman's outlook. Ernie contributes experience, dry humor and streetwise skepticism to the editorial staff.
- Jenica Bergere as Donna French, a member of the Sun staff who admires Kate and became caught up in the complicated personalities and workplace politics of the newsroom.
- Jonathan Katz as Leo

== Episodes ==
No.	Title	Directed by	Written by	Original release date	Prod. code	Viewers (millions)
1	"Above the Fold"	Thomas Schlamme	Diane English	October 21, 1996	001	16.41
2	"Paper Cuts"	Thomas Schlamme	Jeffrey Klarik	October 28, 1996	002	14.8
3	"Getting Above the Hemp"	Thomas Schlamme	Jack Burditt	November 11, 1996	003	15.5
4	"High Noon"	Thomas Schlamme	Dawn DeKeyser	November 18, 1996	004	15.3
5	"The Sandwich"	Jay Sandrich	Jhoni Marchinko	November 25, 1996	005	15.1
6	"Mike & Kelly & Max & Kate"	Jay Sandrich	Stephen Nathan	December 9, 1996	006	13.3
7	"United We Fall"	Jay Sandrich	Jack Burditt	December 16, 1996	007	12.2
8	"The Black Book"	Jay Sandrich	Jeff Filgo & Jackie Behan	January 6, 1997	008	13.81
9	"Devil in a Blue Dress"	Philip Charles MacKenzie	Jeff Filgo & Jackie Behan	January 13, 1997	009	14.33
10	"Funny, You Don't Look One Hundred"	Phillip Charles MacKenzie	Dawn DeKeyser	January 20, 1997	010	14.12
11	"The English-Speaking Patients"	Philip Charles Mackenzie	Stephen Nathan & Marc Flanagan	February 3, 1997	011	13.20
12	"The Bodyguard: Part 1"	Robert Berlinger	Jhoni Marchinko	February 10, 1997	012A	13.54
13	"The Bodyguard: Part 2"	Brian K. Roberts	Jhoni Marchinko	February 17, 1997	012B	15.09
14	"Life Without Mikey"	Jay Sandrich	Jack Burditt	February 24, 1997	013	12.63
15	"Breaking the Rules"	Robert Berlinger	Craig Hoffman	March 3, 1997	014	15.77
16	"Face Off"	Jay Sandrich	Scott Kaufer	March 10, 1997	015	12.96
17	"The Fighting Irish"	Barnet Kellman	Story by : Michael Baser & Frank Dungan; Teleplay by : Michael Baser, Frank Dungan, & Diane English	April 7, 1997	016	13.15
18	"Logan's Run"	David Steinberg	Jeff Filgo & Jackie Behan	April 21, 1997	017	9.12
19	"The Debutante"	Gail Mancuso	Chris Alberghini & Mike Chessler	April 28, 1997	018	13.15
20	"The Bodyguard Strikes Back"	Brian K. Roberts	Jhoni Marchinko	May 5, 1997	019	11.17
21	"Murphy's Law"	Joe Regalbuto	Diane English	May 12, 1997	021	14.02
22	"Going to the Dogs"	Joe Regalbuto	Stephen Nathan & Jack Burditt	May 19, 1997	020	12.19

== Production ==
The original concept from the show came from Jeffrey Lane, who came up with the idea. Lane abruptly exited, and a handful of showrunners came in, and settled on Diane English, who created Murphy Brown.

The original pilot was infamous for the reporters using typewriters.
