= A Simple Twist of Fate =

1994 film by Gillies MacKinnon

- Original poster
- Directed by: Gillies MacKinnon
- Written by: Steve Martin
- Based on: Silas Marner by George Eliot
- Produced by: Steve Martin; Ric Kidney; Karen Snow
- Starring: Steve Martin; Gabriel Byrne; Catherine O'Hara; Stephen Baldwin
- Cinematography: Andrew Dunn
- Edited by: Humphrey Dixon
- Music by: Cliff Eidelman
- Production company: Touchstone Pictures
- Distributed by: Buena Vista Pictures Distribution
- Release date: September 2, 1994
- Running time: 106 minutes
- Country: United States
- Language: English
- Box office: $3,430,583

A Simple Twist of Fate is a 1994 American comedy-drama film directed by Gillies MacKinnon. The screenplay by Steve Martin is loosely based on the 1861 novel Silas Marner by George Eliot. Martin stars, along with Gabriel Byrne, Catherine O'Hara and Stephen Baldwin.

== Plot ==
When high school music teacher Michael McCann discovers that his wife is pregnant by his best friend, he divorces her and retreats into a life of solitude as a maker of finely crafted furniture in rural Virginia. Five years later, his only companion is a valuable collection of gold coins. Tanny Newland, the unsavory younger brother of politician John Newland, crashes his brother's car in the woods surrounding Michael's house, seriously injuring the woman he is with. Afraid of being arrested for drunk driving, Tanny steals Michael's coins while he is sleeping, takes off into the night, and is never seen again.

Weeks later during a winter storm, Michael is startled to discover that a toddler has wandered into his home. A short distance away he discovers the body of her mother, a heroin addict whose car had run out of gas nearby. Unbeknown to him, the child is the out-of-wedlock daughter of John Newland, who participates in the investigation but keeps his relationship to the child a secret in order to protect his career.

Michael is permitted to adopt the child and christens her Mathilda. She proves to be difficult in her early years, but with the help of friend and local shopkeeper April Simon, Michael raises her to be a bright, personable, precocious young woman, and he is transformed by her presence. As John watches his daughter grow older, he invites her to join him and wife Nancy in their home. John arranges for her to learn to ride a horse, eventually giving her one.

Due to Nancy's two miscarriages and the couple's deep desire to have a child, Nancy insists on adoption. John finally reveals Mathilda's true identity and his desire to adopt her properly. Nancy encourages him to gain custody, and a trial ensues.

Although John's lawyer tries to manipulate the court and Mathilda herself to see that the Newlands are the better parents, Mathilda prefers Michael. The judge is inclined to side with the Newlands, given their wealth and ability to provide Mathilda with advantages she never would have with Michael. Then the remains of Tanny Newland – surrounded by the gold coins he stole from Michael – are found at the bottom of the quarry his brother was draining to create a lake surrounded by real estate he planned to sell.

Michael's sudden return to wealth convinces him that Mathilda should remain with Michael. The film ends with Michael taking Mathilda to visit her mother's grave.

== Cast ==
- Steve Martin as Michael McCann
- Gabriel Byrne as John Newland
- Catherine O'Hara as April Simon
- Stephen Baldwin as Tanny Newland
- Laura Linney as Nancy Newland
- Alana Austin as Mathilda McCann (age 10)
  - Alyssa Austin as Mathilda McCann (age 5)
  - Alaina & Callie Mobley as Mathilda McCann (age 3)
  - Victoria & Elizabeth Evans as Mathilda McCann (age 1-1 1/2)
- Amelia Campbell as Marsha Swanson
- Michael Des Barres as Bryce
- Byron Jennings as Keating
- Carolyn McCormick as Elaine McCann
- Anne Heche as Tanny's Playmate

== Release ==
The film opened on 319 screens on Labor Day weekend and earned $1,404,904 over a four-day period, ranking #19 among all releases. It eventually grossed $3,430,583 at the domestic box office.

== Reception ==
Roger Ebert of the Chicago Sun-Times called the film "warm and funny", stating: "there is a lot to like about [it...but] try as I might, I just couldn't accept this Victorian story in modern dress. The motivations seemed wrong (would 20th century people behave this way?), the plotting seemed contrived (as indeed it was), and the plot's habit of springing big surprises on us was too manipulative. This is not at all a bad movie, mind you, but a good movie gone wrong, through a simple twist of miscalculation.

Hal Hinson of The Washington Post wrote: "When clowns write sad stories for themselves, the results are almost always disastrous. For A Simple Twist of Fate, Steve Martin not only wrote the screenplay... but also executive-produced the project, creating for himself a character that is about as different from his typical roles as can be imagined. And if the exercise isn't precisely disastrous, it comes very close to it... Perhaps it's a stretch for a performer with such remarkable charisma to play someone who is without it... Martin does a skillful job of nullifying himself, and he does present a side of himself that has been glimpsed only briefly. But what a joyless accomplishment it is. As a comic, Martin soars, but here he has clipped his own wings."

According to Variety, "The pairing of Steve Martin and 19th-century novelist George Eliot seems about as likely an artistic union as Oliver Stone adapting Louisa May Alcott. Yet A Simple Twist of Fate—inspired by Silas Marner—betrays no tell-tale strains of clashing sensibilities. Martin leavens the material somewhat, but this is a faithful, heartfelt, somber piece about family and responsibility."

Kevin Thomas, in the Los Angeles Times, gave Steve Martin and director Gillies MacKinnon credit for taking risks by updating the classic George Eliot novel. He describes it as a "charming update of Silas Marner" that is well written, well played and has substance and a musical score that successfully bring 19th century literature into a moving and powerful modern-day film.

On Rotten Tomatoes, the film has an approval rating of 46% based on reviews from 24 critics, with an average rating of 5.4/10. Audiences polled by CinemaScore gave the film an average grade of "B+" on an A+ to F scale.

== Accolades ==
Alana Austin was nominated for the Young Artist Award for Best Performance by a Young Actress Starring in a Motion Picture for her portrayal of ten-year-old Mathilda. Her younger sister Alyssa was nominated for Best Performance by an Actress Under Ten in a Motion Picture for her portrayal of the character at the age of five.
