= While the Children Sleep =

- Written by: Stephen Niver
- Directed by: Russell Mulcahy
- Starring: Mariana Klaveno; Gail O'Grady; William R. Moses; Tristan Lake Leabu; Madison Davenport; Stacy Haiduk
- Music by: Elia Cmiral
- Country of origin: United States
- Original language: English

Production
- Executive producers: Robert Halmi Jr.; Larry Levinson
- Producers: Lincoln Lageson; Randy Pope
- Cinematography: Maximo Munzi
- Editor: Colleen Halsey
- Production companies: Larry Levinson Productions; RHI Entertainment

Original release
- Network: Lifetime Movie Network
- Release: September 16, 2007

While the Children Sleep (also known as The Sitter) is a 2007 American made-for-television horror film directed by Russell Mulcahy and starring Mariana Klaveno, Gail O'Grady, William R. Moses, Tristan Lake Leabu, Madison Davenport, and Stacy Haiduk. Released on the Lifetime Movie Network, its plot concerns a couple who hires a live-in nanny who inserts herself increasingly into the family routine. Then friends of the family begin to have mysterious accidents, as the nanny conspires to replace the mother through murder.

The film received generally negative reviews, with many critics saying the film was derivative of other 90s femme fatale psychological thrillers, with many especially comparing it to the similar film The Hand That Rocks the Cradle (1992). Despite this, Mariana Klaveno’s performance as psychopath Abby received praise.

== Plot ==
A couple, Carter and Meghan, decide that they should hire a live-in sitter so that they can both work and support their two children, Max and Casey. Abby Reed answers their advertisement and they move her in immediately. After some initial rough spots with the kids, the family warms to Abby. Abby seems obsessed with Carter, and when she helps organize a company party for a big success — that is rained out — she's in tears and distraught over the failed party. Carter's friend Tate tries to take advantage of Abby in her upset state, and then Tate is discovered dead in a car accident. Neighbor Mel is then suspicious of Abby, and is soon found dead as well, electrocuted in her bath. Then, Meghan's friend Shawna, now suspecting Abby as well, threatens disclosure as the final moments of Abby's plan to replace Meghan unfold. As backstory, we find that Abby, whose real name is Linda Reynolds, had been rescued from her abusive mother by family lawyer Carter many years before, where Abby's obsession originates with the family and desire to replace Meghan as his wife.

Abby attacks Meghan twice. She kills Shawna. She kidnaps Carter and the kids. Abby professes her "love" to Carter, but Carter vehemently rejects her. As Abby tries to attack Meghan once more to spite Carter, Meghan pulls a pair of scissors, and stabs Abby twice. Abby stares longingly into Carter's gaze, chagrin ridden all over her face, before lying down on the staircase (which she had used as a weapon with which to attack Meghan twice) and breathing her last breaths. As husband and wife reel from the incident, Carter asks his wife how her day went. Meghan smiles and says that she "had to fire the sitter."

== Cast ==
- Mariana Klaveno as Abigail "Abby" Reed/Linda Reynolds
  - Dominique Grund as young Abby/Linda
- Gail O'Grady as Meghan Eastman
- William R. Moses as Carter Eastman
- Tristan Lake Leabu as Maxwell "Max" Eastman
- Madison Davenport as Casey Eastman
- Stacy Haiduk as Shawna Pierson
- Joanne Baron as Melissa "Mel" Olson
- Alan Blumenfeld as Del Olson
- Thomas Curtis as Thomas "Tom" Olson
- Jon Lindstrom as Tate Walker
- Monique Daniels as Laura Berry
- Jill Jaress as Elizabeth Reynolds
- Jordan Moser as Chris

== Reception ==
The film's plot was compared by reviewers to the 1992 film The Hand That Rocks the Cradle and the 2001 film The Glass House, as well as others.

== DVD release ==
The film was released on DVD on June 17, 2008 under the name The Sitter.
