= Supercross (film) =

- Theatrical release poster
- Directed by: Steve Boyum
- Screenplay by: Ken Solarz; Bart Baker
- Story by: Bart Baker; Keith Alan Bernstein
- Produced by: Steve Austin; Richard Gabai; J. Todd Harris
- Starring: Steve Howey; Mike Vogel; Sophia Bush; Cameron Richardson; Channing Tatum
- Cinematography: William Wages
- Edited by: Alan Cody; Brett Hedlund
- Music by: Jasper Randall
- Production companies: Tag Entertainment; Clear Channel Entertainment Motor Sports
- Distributed by: 20th Century Fox
- Release dates: May 12, 2005 (Cannes); August 17, 2005
- Running time: 80 minutes
- Country: United States
- Language: English
- Budget: $30 million
- Box office: $3,344,431

Supercross, marketed and sometimes referred to as Supercross: The Movie, is a 2005 American action film directed by Steve Boyum and starring Steve Howey and Mike Vogel. The film portrays youthful relationships in the world of professional Supercross.

== Plot ==
Trip Carlyle and his elder brother, K.C. are motocross bikers following their father's dream to win the Supercross Championship. The Carlyle brothers clean swimming pools as a part-time job.

K.C. invites Zoe to Apple Valley, California to watch Trip and K.C. race in Supermoto and Zoe accepts. Trip meets another racer named Piper. During the final moments of the race, the Carlyle brothers crash down and Piper's brother, Owen Cole wins the race. After the race, Jeff Johnson, a former racer, invites the Carlyle brothers to American Nami headquarters where the Carlyle brother meets Rowdy Sparks, another racer and races at the test track. During the race, Rowdy dashes Trip and Rowdy and Trip fight but Jeff and Rowdy's father, Clay recruit K.C. for Team Nami.

Trip bets and loses his truck in a street race and gets arrested. K.C. bails out Trip but the Carlyle brothers argue. Trip and Piper grew closer. Clay orders K.C. not to win but help Rowdy to win races. K.C. helps Rowdy to win races by cutting off other racers. Tyler Evans argues with K.C. for cutting Tyler off in the race. Trip makes a deal with Piper's father who owns Hog Heavens Honda in exchange for better racing equipment. During a race, Tyler Evans tries to knock off K.C. but Trip injures himself while saving K.C. from Tyler. K.C. wins the race but Clay wants only Rowdy to win future races for Team Nami. K.C. quits Team Nami and Trip slowly recovers. K.C. joins Hog Heavens with Trip's help and Trip gets intimate with Piper.

The Supercross Championship takes place at Sam Boyd Stadium, Las Vegas, Nevada. During the final race, Tyler and Rowdy try to knock off K.C. but K.C. tricks Tyler and Rowdy to fall off the track. K.C.'s dreams come true as K.C. wins the supercross championship.

== Cast ==
- Steve Howey as K.C. Carlyle
- Mike Vogel as Trip Carlyle
- Cameron Richardson as Piper Cole
- Sophia Bush as Zoe Lang
- Channing Tatum as Rowdy Sparks
- Robert Carradine as Clay Sparks
- Robert Patrick as Earl Cole
- Aaron Carter as Owen Cole
- Ryan Locke as Jeff Johnson
- J. D. Pardo as Chuy
- David Castillo as Jimmy Castillo
- Antonia Jones as Nurse
- Jamie Little as herself
- Ricky Carmichael as himself
- Kevin Windham as himself
- Ricky Johnson as himself
- Chad Reed as himself
- Alana Austin as Rider Girlfriend
- Terry Boyd as himself
- Tyler Evans as himself

== Production ==
In December 2002, Supercross was announced as one of the first productions of Tag Studios, a jointly owned film and TV production entity owned by music producer Lou Pearlman and Steven Austin a producer of family films.

== Reception ==
Supercross was panned by critics. The film holds a rating of 5% on Rotten Tomatoes based on 73 reviews with the consensus: "While it showcases some cool stunts, Supercross feels like an infomercial for its titular sport, with undeveloped characters and a shopworn plot."

== Soundtrack ==
Supercross is the soundtrack to the motocross film "Supercross". It has not been released yet but here are the tracks listed in the film.

Track listing

1. Saturday Night - 4:01 - (Ozomatli)
2. Pirates - 2:20 - (Bullets and Octane)
3. California Records - - (Longbeach Shortcuts)
4. Make Them Believe - 3:47 - (Fu Manchu)
5. That's the Way It Is - 3:12 - (Powerman 5000)
6. Tear Up This Town - 3:27 - (Leif Garrett)
7. Chemical - 3:48 - (Joseph Arthur) (aka Start Trouble)
8. Get Out Alive - 3:27 - (Socialburn)
9. Days of My Life - 4:00 - (City of London)
10. Ride of Your Life - 3:00 - (John Gregory)
11. Things I've Done - 5:00 - (Natural)
12. Everytime - 4:00 - (Rusty Truck)
13. Every Second - 3:00 - (Change of Pace)
