= The Outsider (2002 film) =

2002 film

- Based on: The Outsider by Penelope Williamson
- Teleplay by: Jenny Wingfield
- Directed by: Randa Haines
- Starring: Tim Daly; Naomi Watts; David Carradine; Keith Carradine
- Music by: Todd Boekelheide
- Country of origin: United States
- Original language: English

Production
- Producer: Darryl Sheen
- Cinematography: Ben Nott
- Editor: Lisa Bromwell
- Running time: 119 minutes
- Production companies: Coote Hayes Productions; Hallmark Entertainment

Original release
- Network: Showtime
- Release: November 10, 2002

The Outsider is a 2002 Western television film starring Tim Daly and Naomi Watts. The film is based on Penelope Williamson's novel. It was first aired on Showtime on November 10, 2002.

== Plot summary ==
The Outsider takes place in Montana in the late 19th century. At the beginning of the movie, Ben Yoder (Brett Tucker) is preparing to leave his house on a rainy day. His young son, Benjo (Thomas Curtis) wants to go with him, but Ben tells him to stay home, "to protect your mother"—his wife, Rebecca (Naomi Watts).

As Yoder is pulling a rescued sheep from the river, he happens upon two men cutting a fence where the rest of the flock are stabled, henchmen of ruthless cattle baron Fergus Hunter (John Noble). An argument ensues between Yoder and the henchmen about whether or not the land is "open range" or "legally homesteaded". Using the rope still tied around his waist from rescuing the stray sheep, Yoder winds up being dragged several feet by his horse, until he finally manages to cut himself free with a small knife. He angrily insists to Fergus Hunter to get off his land; "I won't sell." Hunter retorts, "No, I guess not...but your widow will." With tears in his eyes, Ben Yoder drops his knife, refusing to fight back against the men he knows are going to kill him. A few hours later, Rebecca and Benjo find him hanging from a large tree; this has an incredibly traumatizing effect on the little boy.

At the Yoder homestead, the religious community they belong to—a group resembling the Amish that refer to themselves as the "Plain People"—are gathered. The town doctor, Lucas Henry (David Carradine), offers Mrs. Yoder a pill of some sort, but one of the men, Noah Weaver (Keith Carradine) responds coldly, "She does not need your pills, doctor. She will pray." Meanwhile, members of Rebecca's family—including her father, who leads the church—are frustrated that the sheriff and his men refuse to do anything about Ben Yoder's murder, other than have Hunter's men fix the fence they originally cut.

Several months pass by, and winter arrives. Rebecca and Benjo manage the homestead on their own; the latter has almost stopped speaking entirely since he found his father dead. However, he quietly alerts his mother when a wounded man approaches them, staggering through the snow. When he passes out in front of them, Rebecca sends her son into town to fetch Doc Henry, urging him to communicate however necessary to get the doctor to come out to their house. As Benjo hurries to town, Rebecca drags the unconscious man back into her home and begins disarming him, her alarm growing as she finds more and more guns on his person.

Wounded outlaw Johnny Gault (Tim Daly) is given refuge by widowed sheep farmer Rebecca Yoder. This puts Rebecca on the outs with her own people. They incur the wrath of a ruthless cattle baron who wants the land of the religious group.

The two enter into a relationship which is forbidden since he is an "outsider" from their religion and way of life. She is shunned from the fold until she is ready to confess her sins from this illicit union and be forgiven. She decides she must go back to her old way of living. When the time comes for her to do so, she is not able to walk away from her new life with Johnny. She leaves the meeting that had been set up and runs back to Johnny.

In an attempt to help Johnny in a shoot out, during which Johnny kills also the cattle baron, Rebecca is hit by an enemy's bullet. She eventually recovers and they (presumably) live happily ever after as they ride off (into the sunset).

== Cast ==
- Tim Daly as Johnny Gault
- Naomi Watts as Rebecca Yoder
- Keith Carradine as Noah Weaver
- David Carradine as Doctor Lucas Henry
- Thomas Curtis as Benjo Yoder
- John Noble as Fergus Hunter
- Todd Leigh as Mose
- Brett Tucker as Ben Yoder
- Grant Piro as Woodrow Wharton
- Peter McCauley as Isaiah Miller
- Jason Clarke as Ray Childress
- Aaron James Cash as Samuel Miller
- Simon Watts as Abram Miller
- Eamon Farren as Levi Miller
- Kim Knuckey as Sheriff Getts

== See also ==
- Angel and the Badman, a similar film in which John Wayne plays a wounded outlaw who is sheltered by a Quaker family
