= Steven Kent Austin =

American film producer

- Occupation(s): Actor and producer of small-budget independent films

Steven Kent Austin is an American actor and producer of small-budget independent films. He also directed a film version of Route 66. He was chairman, chief executive officer and chief financial officer of the now defunct TAG Entertainment Corp, which he founded in 1999, and owner of American Film Ventures, LLC.

== Biography ==
Austin travelled with his parents to the Palm Springs area where they became involved in the Hollywood entertainment industry. For much of his life, Austin was based in the Santa Monica and sometimes in the Salt Lake City areas.

== Productions ==
- Deal (2008) .... Executive Producer
- Miracle Dogs Too (2006) (V) ... Executive Producer
- Red Riding Hood (2006) .... Producer
- Popstar (2005) .... Producer
- American Black Beauty (2005) (TV) .... Co Executive Producer
- Supercross (2005) .... Executive Producer / Assistant Director
- Death of a Saleswoman (2005) .... Executive Producer
- Motocross Kids (2004) ... Producer
- Arizona Highways (2004) (TV mini-series) .... Executive Producer
- Miracle Dogs (2003) (TV) ... Executive Producer
- Hansel & Gretel (2002) .... Producer
- The Santa Trap (2002) (TV) ... Executive Producer
- Max Hell Frog Warrior (2002) (V) ... Distributor
- The Retrievers (2001) (TV) .... Executive Producer
- No Place Like Home (2001) .... Executive Producer
- Castle Rock (2001) ... Executive Producer
- Route 66 ... Producer / Director
