= Babyshambles discography =

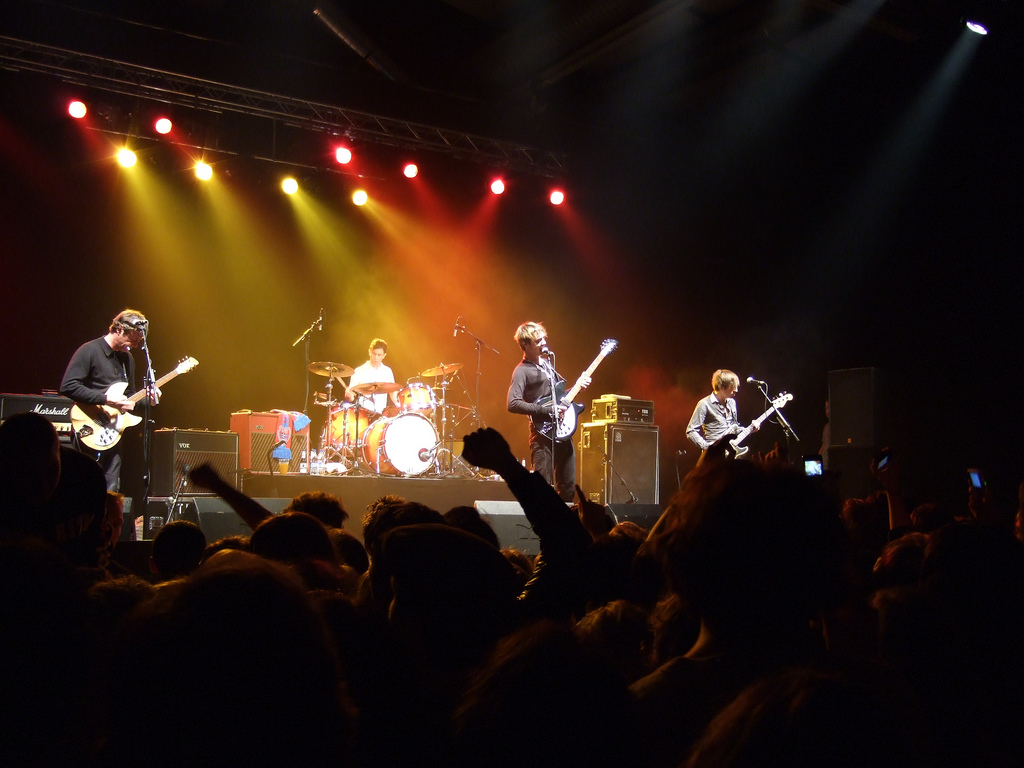
- Studio albums: 3
- Extended plays: 3
- Live albums: 1
- Singles: 7
- B-sides: 19
- Video albums: 4
- Music videos: 9

This is a comprehensive discography of Babyshambles, a London-based English indie rock band. As of July 2013, they had released three studio albums, seven singles, three EPs, and one live album.

== Studio albums ==
List of albums, with selected chart positions
| Title | Album details | Peak chart positions | | | | | | | | | | Sales | Certifications |
| Title | Album details | UK | AUT | BEL | FRA | GER | IRE | ITA | JPN | SWE | SWI | Sales | Certifications |
|---|---|---|---|---|---|---|---|---|---|---|---|---|---|
| Down in Albion | Released: 14 November 2005; Label: Rough Trade; Formats: CD, LP, digital download | 10 | 52 | — | 72 | 46 | 28 | 99 | 36 | 46 | 93 | UK: 100,000; US: 8,000 | BPI: Gold |
| Shotter's Nation | Released: 1 October 2007; Label: EMI, Parlophone, Astralwerks; Formats: CD, LP, digital download | 5 | 14 | 58 | 17 | 18 | 19 | 71 | 26 | 13 | 29 | UK: 100,000; FRA: 50,000 | BPI: Gold; SNEP: Gold |
| Sequel to the Prequel | Released: 2 September 2013; Label: Parlophone; Formats: CD, LP, digital download | 10 | 8 | 15 | 20 | 10 | — | 59 | 48 | 28 | — | | |
"—" denotes albums that did not chart.

== Live albums ==
| Year | Album details | Peak positions | | | | | | | | Certifications |
| Year | Album details | UK | FR | GER | IR | NOR | SWI | AUT | EUR 100 | Certifications |
|---|---|---|---|---|---|---|---|---|---|---|
| 2008 | Oh! What a Lovely Tour: Label: EMI, Parlophone; Released: 2 June 2008; Format: CD, DVD | — | 87 | — | — | — | — | — | — | — |

|- | 2026 | align="left"| Live At KOKO

- Label: EMI, Parlophone
- Released: 9 October 2026
- Format: CD, DVD

== Extended plays ==
| Year | Album details | Peak chart positions | | | |
| Year | Album details | UK | AUT | DK | JPN |
|---|---|---|---|---|---|
| 2005 | Fuck Forever: Label: EMI; Released: August 2005 (Japan only); Format: Maxi CD | 4 | — | — | 113 |
| 2005 | Albion: Label: EMI; Released: November 2005 (Japan only); Format: Maxi CD | 8 | — | — | 36 |
| 2006 | The Blinding EP: Label: Regal, Parlophone; Released: December 2006; Format: Extended play | 62 | 44 | 5 | 147 |

== Singles ==
=== As lead artist ===
| Single | Year | Peak chart positions | | | | | | | | | | Album |
| Single | Year | UK | UK Indie | UK Phys | AUS | BEL (FL) | BEL (WA) | FRA | IRE | SCO | SWE | Album |
|---|---|---|---|---|---|---|---|---|---|---|---|---|
| "BabyShambles" | 2004 | 32 | 2 | 32 | — | — | — | — | — | — | — | Non-album single |
| "Killamangiro" | 2004 | 8 | 1 | 8 | — | — | — | — | 40 | 8 | — | Down in Albion |
| "Fuck Forever" | 2005 | 4 | 1 | 4 | 76 | — | — | — | 22 | 4 | — | Down in Albion |
| "Albion" | 2005 | 8 | 1 | 5 | — | — | — | — | — | 5 | — | Down in Albion |
| "Janie Jones (Strummerville)" | 2006 | 17 | 1 | 8 | — | — | — | — | 45 | 9 | — | Non-album single |
| "Delivery" | 2007 | 6 | — | 4 | — | — (Note: "Delivery" did not enter the Flanders Ultratop 50, but peaked at number 11 on the Ultratip chart.) | — (Note: "Delivery" did not enter the Wallonia Ultratop 50, but peaked at number 11 on the Ultratip chart.) | 84 | 42 | 2 | 52 | Shotter's Nation |
| "You Talk" | 2007 | 54 | — | 13 | — | — | — | — | — | 15 | — | Shotter's Nation |
| "Side of the Road"^{[A]} | 2010 | — | — | 17 | — | — | — | — | — | — | — | Shotter's Nation |
| "Nothing Comes to Nothing" | 2013 | — | — | 7 | — | — (Note: "Nothing Comes to Nothing" did not enter the Flanders Ultratop 50, but peaked at number 34 on the Ultratip chart.) | — (Note: "Nothing Comes to Nothing" did not enter the Wallonia Ultratop 50, but peaked at number 18 on the Ultratip chart.) | — | — | — | — | Sequel to the Prequel |
| "Picture Me In a Hospital" | 2013 | — | — | — | — | — | — | — | — | — | — | Sequel to the Prequel |
| "Fall From Grace" | 2013 | — | — | 16 | — | — | — (Note: "Fall From Grace" did not enter the Wallonia Ultratop 50, but peaked at number 15 on the Ultratip chart.) | — | — | — | — | Sequel to the Prequel |

Notes:

- A "Side of the Road" was released as a 7" vinyl only single for Record Store Day 2010. It was limited to 1,000 copies.

== B-sides ==
| Year | Song | A-side |
|---|---|---|
| 2004 | "Flophouse" | "BabyShambles" |
| 2004 | "What Katie Did" | "BabyShambles" |
| 2004 | "Man Who Came to Stay" | "Killamangiro" |
| 2005 | "Black Boy Lane" | "Fuck Forever" |
| 2005 | "Monkey Casino" | "Fuck Forever" |
| 2005 | "East of Eden" | "Fuck Forever" |
| 2005 | "Babyshambles (re-recording)" | "Fuck Forever" |
| 2005 | "My Darling Clementine" | "Albion" |
| 2005 | "Why Did You Break My Heart/Piracy" | "Albion" |
| 2005 | "Wolfman" | "Albion" |
| 2005 | "Do You Know Me" | "Albion" |
| 2006 | "Janie Jones (Pete Doherty vocal version)" | "Janie Jones" |
| 2007 | "Stone Me" | "Delivery" |
| 2007 | "I Wish" (Mik's Vocal Version) | "Delivery" |
| 2007 | "A Day Out in New Brighton" | "Delivery" |
| 2007 | "Torn" | "Delivery" |
| 2007 | "Revelations" | "You Talk" |
| 2007 | "UnBiloTitled" (acoustic) | "You Talk" |
| 2007 | "Carry On Up the Morning" (acoustic) | "You Talk" |

Peter Doherty, (under the name of Babyshambles) also released an acoustic version of The Libertines song "What Katie Did" through a French magazine called Amelia's Magazine. This very rare (only 1000 copies) clear flexi-disk was attached to the front of issue number 1 of the magazine which quickly sold out. It is now a collectable for any fan and can sometimes be found on auction sites such as eBay.

== DVDs ==
| Year | Release details |
|---|---|
| 2007 | We Like to Boogaloo (Bonus DVD): Label: Parlophone; Released: 1 October 2007; Available only as a bonus DVD with the limited edition of Shotter's Nation. |
| 2007 | Up the Shambles - Live in Manchester: Label: Eagle Vision; Released: 6 November 2007 |
| 2008 | Drew's Birthday: Live à L'Elysée Montmartre (Bonus DVD): Label: Parlophone; Released: 12 May 2008; Available only as a bonus DVD with the "French" edition of Shotter's Nation. |
| 2008 | Oh! What a Lovely Tour: Label: Parlophone; Released: 2 June 2008 |

== Music videos ==
| Video | Director |
|---|---|
| "Killamangiro" | Douglas Hart |
| "Fuck Forever" | Jez Murrell |
| "Albion" | Roger Pomphrey |
| "Janie Jones (Strummerville)" | Drew McConnell & Harry Holm |
| "The Blinding" | Julien Temple |
| "Love You But You're Green" | Julien Temple |
| "Delivery" | Douglas Hart |
| "French Dog Blues" | David Mullett |
| "You Talk" | Douglas Hart |
| "Nothing Comes To Nothing" | |

== Free releases ==
- "Beg, Steal or Borrow" (2006), given away with tickets to Get Loaded In The Park only.
- "Dirty Fame" (2006), given away with The Big Issue (download only)
- "The Blinding" (2006), given away with The Big Issue
- "Delivery (Acoustic Version)" (2007), given away as 7" vinyl with NME magazine.
- "Stone Me, What A Life!" (2007), given away for LMHR CD with NME magazine.
