= Oh! What a Lovely Tour =

Oh What A Lovely Tour

Live album / DVD by Babyshambles
- Released: 2 June 2008 (UK); 24 June 2008 (US)
- Recorded: 1 December 2007; SECC Glasgow, Glasgow, UK
- Genre: indie
- Label: Parlophone (UK); Astralwerks (US)

Babyshambles chronology
| Shotter's Nation (2007) | Oh What A Lovely Tour (2008) | Sequel to the Prequel (2013) |

Pete Doherty chronology
| Time for Heroes - The Best of The Libertines (2007) | Oh! What A Lovely Tour (2008) | Grace/Wastelands (2009) |

Professional ratings
Review scores
| Source | Rating |
|---|---|
| Allmusic | 3.5/5 stars |
| Pitchfork Media | 5.8/10 |

Oh! What a Lovely Tour is a CD/DVD package by the British indie rock band Babyshambles released on 2 June 2008. It is the first live album of the band. The concert was recorded during the winter leg of the UK arena tour at the SECC Glasgow on 1 December 2007. In addition to the concert film edited and directed by Giorgio Testi, the DVD also contains the music videos for "The Blinding", "Love You But You're Green", "Delivery" and "You Talk".

== Credits ==
Credits to some songs are different from on previous albums. The reason is yet unknown.

- "The Good Old Days" credits are given to Pete Doherty, while on Up The Bracket, The Libertines debut album, they were given to Doherty/Barat.
- "Back From The Dead" credits are given to Doherty, Peter Wolfe, Carl Barat and Matt White, while on Down In Albion, Babyshambles debut album, they were given to Doherty/Wolfe.
- "Baddies Boogie" credits are given to Doherty, Whitnall and Nick Toczek, while on Shotter's Nation, Babyshambles second album, they were given to Doherty/Whitnall. Babyshambles were accused of plagia for this song by members of Whitnall's former band a few months after Shotter's Nation release.
- Credits for the songs "Pipedown" and "Fuck Forever" are given to Peter Doherty and "Patrick Waldon" [sic], instead of Doherty and Patrick Walden.

== Track listing CD/DVD ==
| No. | Title | Writer(s) | Length |
|---|---|---|---|
| 1. | "Carry On Up The Morning" | Peter Doherty, Michael Whitnall | 3:04 |
| 2. | "Delivery" | Doherty, Whitnall | 3:18 |
| 3. | "Beg, Steal Or Borrow" | Doherty, Whitnall | 3:16 |
| 4. | "Baddie's Boogie" | Doherty, Whitnall, Nick Toczek | 3:48 |
| 5. | "Unstookie Titled" | Doherty, Whitnall, Adam Ficek | 4:37 |
| 6. | "Side of the Road/Buttercup Sing-A-Long" | Doherty / Mike D’Abo, Tony Macaulay | 3:09 |
| 7. | "UnBiloTitled" | Doherty, Peter Wolfe, Ficek | 4:09 |
| 8. | "The Blinding" | Doherty | 2:41 |
| 9. | "You Talk" | Doherty, Kate Moss | 4:02 |
| 10. | "Sedative" | Doherty | 4:41 |
| 11. | "Crumb Begging Baghead" | Doherty, Whitnall | 3:40 |
| 12. | "Lost Art of Murder/The Good Old Days" | Doherty | 5:25 |
| 13. | "There She Goes" | Doherty | 4:45 |
| 14. | "Albion" (Dedicated during the concert to Amy Winehouse) | Doherty | 5:17 |
| 15. | "Pipedown" | Doherty, Patrick Waldon | 2:50 |
| 16. | "Killamangiro" | Doherty | 3:55 |
| 17. | "Back From The Dead" | Doherty, Wolfe, Carl Barat, Matt White | 4:29 |
| 18. | "I Wish" | Doherty | 3:30 |
| 19. | "Fuck Forever" | Doherty, Waldon | 6:24 |
| Total length: | | | 77:00 |

== Personnel ==
- Peter Doherty – guitar, vocals
- Michael Whitnall – guitar, vocals
- Adam Ficek – drums, percussion, keyboards, vocals
- Drew McConnell – bass guitar, double bass, vocals

== See also ==
- Babyshambles discography
