= Patrick Walden =

English musician (1978–2025)

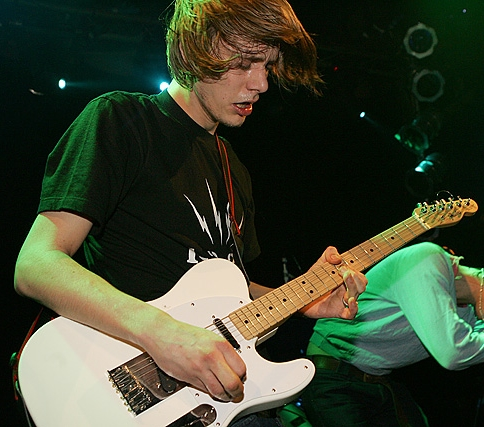
- Walden in 2005

Background information
- Born: Patrick George Walden; 5 October 1978; Islington, London, England
- Died: 20 June 2025 (aged 46)
- Genres: Rock; jazz
- Occupations: Guitarist; songwriter
- Instruments: Guitar; bass guitar
- Formerly of: Babyshambles

Patrick George Walden (5 October 1978 – 20 June 2025) was an English musician, best known as the guitarist for Babyshambles. Prior to joining Babyshambles, Walden belonged to a variety of London groups including Fluid, the Six Cold Thousand, and The White Sport, in the latter of which he played alongside future Babyshambles drummer Adam Ficek. Walden also worked as a live and session guitarist and bassist for numerous recording artists including Whitey, James Blunt, 500 and Crave, Ed Laliq, and The Honeymoon.

== Career ==
=== Babyshambles ===
In the early summer of 2004, when Pete Doherty once again found himself cast out of The Libertines because of his drug use, he brought Babyshambles to the fore with Walden on lead guitar. The band's line-up underwent several changes before stabilizing during the late summer of 2004 with Doherty on vocals, Walden on guitar, Gemma Clarke on drums, and Drew McConnell on bass. Walden co-wrote a number of Babyshambles songs with Pete Doherty. One of them, "The Man Who Came to Stay," was released as the B-side to "Killamangiro" in November 2004. Other Doherty/Walden compositions include Top-10 single "Fuck Forever" and "Loyalty Song," "352 Days," "In Love With a Feeling," "Up the Morning," "Pipe Down," "32 December," and "8 Dead Boys." He co-wrote six of the sixteen tracks that made it onto Down in Albion, Babyshambles' debut album.

At Babyshambles' live shows, he usually performed using an Olympic White 1960 Fender Jazzmaster, with a 1985 Jazzmaster and a 90s American Stratocaster as backups. Often citing experimental guitarists like J Mascis, Thurston Moore and Jimi Hendrix as early influences, Walden's unusual playing style set Babyshambles apart from other bands in the East London music scene. Marshall magazine "Marshall Law" lists him as using a JCM900 head with a 1960A cab.

In December 2005, Walden left Babyshambles. The band continued to perform under the same name, but did not replace Walden with a different guitarist immediately. In the 10 January 2006 issue of NME, Walden's departure was officially announced. However, on 23 January 2006, Walden turned up to play guitar for the Babyshambles at a gig in the Junction, Cambridge. He returned once more to the band in February and played several of the gigs on that tour, but never appeared with them onstage again.

Walden left the band because of his heavy drug abuse. In April 2006 Babyshambles went on tour without Walden, who was accused of assaulting his girlfriend, arrested and held for nine days in Pentonville prison. All charges against Walden were eventually dropped. He left London in order to get clean of drugs and Mick Whitnall became Babyshambles' new guitarist. Walden was supposed to have played with Babyshambles on their November–December 2007 Arena tour. The band released a statement saying that he had dropped out at the last minute, even after travelling with them on the tour bus. Walden later stated that he did not appear on stage because there were drugs about, even though it was supposed to be a drug-free tour.

=== Later work ===
Walden was rumoured to have been playing at The Cheltenham Jazz Festival (27 April–2 May) as a special guest with Seb Rochford's band Fulborn Teversham, but cancelled the appearance.

Walden appeared at the Rock Against Racism 30th Anniversary Show at the Hackney Empire on 19 July 2007. He played Babyshambles' classics with his old bandmate Drew McConnell. The set list included "The Man Who Came to Stay" and "8 Dead Boys".

On 3 August 2007, Walden played a small gig in Hackney with all of his former Babyshambles bandmates (as well as Mick Whitnall) for friend Peter Wolfe's birthday.

In late 2007, Walden formed the band Big Dave with drummer Seb Rochford and Ruth Goller on bass. In the first half of 2008 the band played a few gigs in small venues. Walden announced that a debut EP would be recorded in 2008. But nothing much was ever heard again.

On 6 November 2009, Walden played a few songs with Babyshambles including "Pipedown" and "Black Boy Lane" at a gig at Halo in Battersea.

In August 2010, Walden appeared in court charged with receiving stolen goods. After being spotted acting suspiciously in a Sutton branch of Wilkinsons, Walden was pursued by security who found in his possession stolen goods and Methadone prescribed to another user.

In April 2011, Walden completed a spell in rehabilitation and began work on a new project with former Rebecas member Robert Mannall. The duo recorded 32 demos that have been posted on various sites on the internet. On 1 May 2011 Walden previewed a selection of new material at the Hawley Arms, as part of Camden Crawl 2011, with Drew McConnell.

In November 2014 Walden did his first interview and photoshoot in a number of years with friend, music enthusiast and blogger Olivia Collins for the website themusicalacidtest and photographer Jack Grange. In the interview he said he was studying a jazz composition degree in an effort to reconnect with his first love, jazz music.

== Death ==
Walden died of a heart attack on 20 June 2025, at the age of 46.
