= Janie Jones (song) =

1977 song by The Clash

Song by the Clash

from the album The Clash
- Released: 8 April 1977
- Recorded: 10 February–27 February 1977
- Studio: CBS Studios (London); National Film and Television School (Beaconsfield)
- Genre: Punk rock
- Length: 2:01
- Label: CBS
- Songwriters: Joe Strummer; Mick Jones
- Producer: Mickey Foote

"Janie Jones" is a song by the English rock band the Clash. It is the opening track on their debut studio album, The Clash (1977). The song is named after Janie Jones, a cabaret singer who organised sex parties at her Kensington home.

A live performance of "Janie Jones" is featured in the 1980 film Rude Boy, and the song has been on the soundtracks of other films as well.

The song is the first choice on narrator Rob Fleming's list of "five best side one track ones" in Nick Hornby's 1995 novel High Fidelity and on Rob Gordon's Top 5 list in the 2000 film adaptation.

== Composition ==
The song is named after Janie Jones, a minor English cabaret and pop singer in the 1960s who was convicted in 1974 of "controlling prostitutes" at sex parties she held at her home in Kensington. She was released from prison in 1977, and an allegedly smitten Joe Strummer composed the song in her honour.

== Releases ==
In addition to The Clash, the song has appeared on the compilation albums The Story of the Clash, Volume 1 (1988) (disc two), Clash on Broadway (1991) (disc one; demo version), and The Essential Clash (2003) (disc one). A live version recorded on 4 June 1981 at Bond's Casino, New York City, is featured on the bootleg Live at Bond's Casino (2000).

== Personnel ==
- Joe Strummer - lead vocal
- Mick Jones - backing vocals, guitar
- Paul Simonon - backing vocal, bass
- Terry Chimes - drums

== Use in other media ==
The live performance of the song at the Apollo in Glasgow on 4 July 1978, is featured in Rude Boy, a 1980 film directed by Jack Hazan and David Mingay, starring Ray Gange and the Clash. The track was re-recorded at Wessex Studios by engineer Bill Price and tape operator Jerry Green. The song was also featured on The Clash: Westway to the World, a 2000 documentary film directed by Don Letts.

Martin Scorsese, a fan of the Clash, said that he considers "Janie Jones" to be the greatest British rock and roll song. He used the song in his 1999 film Bringing Out the Dead. The song is also used in Michael Winterbottom's 2002 film 24 Hour Party People.

Janie Jones is the iconic name given a record producer's long-lost love in season two of Californication, a character played by Madchen Amick. As lead character Hank Moody, David Duchovny refers to the Clash song more than once in scenes with Amick.

Other than its title, the 2010 David M. Rosenthal film Janie Jones bears only slight similarities to the song's lyrical theme.

== Cover versions ==
A rockabilly remake of "Janie Jones" by the Farrell Bros. is included on the various-artists tribute album This Is Rockabilly Clash, released by Raucous Records in 2002. In 2005, The Slackers and Chris Murray covered it on their collaborative album Slackness and the folk noir trio Songdog included a version on The Time of Summer Lightning. Babyshambles released their version, with contributions from others, in 2006 to benefit Joe Strummer's charity foundation Strummerville.

Other versions include remakes by Neurotic Outsiders and by Against Me!, who performed it in August 2011 for The A.V. Club's Undercover series. Thea Gilmore recreates the drum rhythm at the beginning of the original song in her recording of another Clash song, "I'm Not Down". The song has also been played numerous times in concert by the English bands the Paddingtons and Bush.

"Janie Jones"

Single by Babyshambles & Friends
- Released: October 2006
- Genre: Indie, Rock
- Length: 2:03
- Label: B-Unique
- Songwriters: Joe Strummer and Mick Jones
- Producers: Static, Drew McConnell

Babyshambles & Friends singles chronology
"Albion" (2005)	"Janie Jones" (2006)	"Delivery" (2007)

=== Babyshambles & Friends ===
"Janie Jones" (sometimes "Janie Jones (Strummerville)") was released through B-Unique Records to raise money for late Joe Strummer's charity foundation Strummerville and features contributions from others bands like Dirty Pretty Things, Larrikin Love, We Are Scientists, the Kooks, and Guillemots. This release marks the first time that Carl Barât and Pete Doherty worked together since the Libertines split up, although they never met during the recording process.

==== Music video ====
The video revolves around (the real) Janie Jones being chauffeured around London with Mick Jones. Many of the contributors to the song feature in the video. Drew McConnell accompanies Janie Jones from the Windmill theatre right at the beginning as she's getting into her car, Alan Donohoe from the Rakes is driving the car, two members of Cazals are walking down the street near the start and their singer, Phil Bush, mimes 'lucky lady', the two guys standing in front of the telephone box are Josh Hubbard from The Paddingtons and one member of Guillemots; Carl Barât, Anthony Rossomando, Gary Powell and a guitar can be seen in a car pulling up to a petrol station, while Jack Peñate is also seen at the petrol station and Lisa Moorish is seen singing along towards the end. The lead singer from the Mystery Jets is seen walking with one of the Holloways on the side of the street.

==== Track listing ====
- CD
1. "Janie Jones"
2. "Janie Jones" (Pete Doherty vocal version)
3. "Janie Jones" (Video)
- 7"
1. "Janie Jones"
2. "Janie Jones" (Statik remix)

==== Personnel ====
- Pete Doherty – lead vocals
- Drew McConnell – bass and guitar
- Adam Ficek – drums
- Mick Whitnall – guitar

Contributors

- Kid Harpoon
- Carl Barât
- The Rakes
- Mystery Jets
- The Holloways
- We Are Scientists
- The Paddingtons
- Larrikin Love
- Cazals
- Noisettes
- Good Books
- Ladyfuzz
- The Kooks
- Jack Peñate
- Laura Marling
- The Maccabees
- Lisa Moorish
- Lightspeed Champion
- Jamie T
- Jeremy Warmsley
- Guillemots

Additional contributors to the Statik remix

- Lethal Bizzle
- JME
- No Mind
- Talk Taxis

==== Chart performance ====
Chart (2005)	Peak position
Irish Singles Chart	45
UK Singles Chart	17
UK Indie (Official Charts)	1

== Notes ==
- Gilbert, Pat (2005) [2004]. Passion Is a Fashion: The Real Story of The Clash (4th ed.). London: Aurum Press. ISBN 1-84513-113-4. OCLC 61177239.
- Gray, Marcus (2005) [1995]. The Clash: Return of the Last Gang in Town (5th revised ed.). London: Helter Skelter. ISBN 1-905139-10-1. OCLC 60668626.
- Green, Johnny; Garry Barker (2003) [1997]. A Riot of Our Own: Night and Day with The Clash (3rd ed.). London: Orion. pp. 151, 153–154. ISBN 0-7528-5843-2. OCLC 52990890.
- Gruen, Bob; Chris Salewicz (2004) [2001]. The Clash (3rd ed.). London: Omnibus. ISBN 1-903399-34-3. OCLC 69241279.
- Letts Don; Joe Strummer, Mick Jones, Paul Simonon, Topper Headon, Terry Chimes, Rick Elgood, The Clash (2001). The Clash: Westway to the World (Documentary). New York, NY: Sony Music Entertainment; Dorismo; Uptown Films. Event occurs at 3:10–3:45. ISBN 0-7389-0082-6. OCLC 49798077.
- Needs, Kris (25 January 2005). Joe Strummer and the Legend of the Clash. London: Plexus. ISBN 0-85965-348-X. OCLC 53155325.
- Topping, Keith (2004) [2003]. The Complete Clash (2nd ed.). Richmond: Reynolds & Hearn. ISBN 1-903111-70-6. OCLC 63129186.
