= Sequel to the Prequel =

Studio album by Babyshambles
- Released: 3 September 2013
- Genre: Rock
- Length: 43:21
- Label: EMI
- Producer: Stephen Street

Babyshambles chronology
Oh! What a Lovely Tour (2008)	Sequel to the Prequel (2013)

Singles from Sequel to the Prequel
- 1. "Nothing Comes to Nothing" Released: 22 July 2013; 2. "Fall from Grace" Released: 25 October 2013

Deluxe Edition

Professional ratings
Aggregate scores
Source	Rating
Metacritic	57/100
Review scores
Source	Rating
Clash	7/10
Drowned in Sound	5/10
The Fly	0.5/5 stars
The Guardian	3/5 stars
The Independent	2/5 stars
Mojo	4/5 stars
NME	7/10
PopMatters	3/10 stars
Q	3/5 stars
Record Collector	4/5 stars

Sequel to the Prequel is the third and final studio album by the English band Babyshambles. It was released on 3 September 2013 under EMI Records. It is their first release of new material since 2007's Shotter's Nation.

== Background ==
Originally planned to be Pete Doherty's second solo record, the album soon became a Babyshambles record, with all tracks being co-written by guitarist Mick Whitnall or bassist Drew McConnell, a first for the band. Recording began in January 2013 and included contributions from Stereophonics drummer Jaime Morrison, as the band's previous drummer, Danny Goffey had left in 2012. Production was handled by Stephen Street, who produced Babyshambles' previous studio album, Shotter's Nation, and Pete Doherty's 2009 solo effort, Grace/Wastelands.

== Track listing ==
No.	Title	Writer(s)	Length
1.	"Fireman"	Whitnall - Doherty - McConnell	1:42
2.	"Nothing Comes to Nothing"	Whitnall - Doherty - Stephen Street	3:12
3.	"New Pair"	McConnell - Doherty	3:07
4.	"Farmer's Daughter"	Doherty - Whitnall	5:06
5.	"Fall from Grace"	McConnell - Robinson - Doherty	4:22
6.	"Maybelline"	Whitnall - Doherty	3:17
7.	"Sequel to the Prequel"	Doherty - Whitnall - McConnell	2:58
8.	"Dr. No"	Whitnall - Doherty - McConnell	4:32
9.	"Penguins"	McConnell - Doherty	3:47
10.	"Picture Me in a Hospital"	Doherty - McConnell	3:06
11.	"Seven Shades"	McConnell - Doherty	2:59
12.	"Minefield"	Doherty - McConnell - Whitnall - Robinson	5:13

Deluxe edition bonus disc
No.	Title	Writer(s)	Length
1.	"Cuckoo"	Peter Doherty, Mik Whitnall, Drew McConnell, Dot Allison	4:26
2.	"Stranger in My Own Skin"	Peter Doherty, Peter William Wolfe	2:32
3.	"The Very Last Boy Alive"	Drew McConnell	2:19
4.	"After Hours (the Velvet Underground cover)"	Lou Reed	3:11
5.	"Dr. No (Demo)"	Peter Doherty, Mik Whitnall, Drew McConnell	3:47
Total length:			15:35

UK iTunes Deluxe edition
No.	Title	Length
13.	"Spit It Out!"	2:00
14.	"Cuckoo"	4:24
15.	"Stranger in My Own Skin"	2:31
16.	"The Very Last Boy Alive"	2:19
17.	"After Hours (the Velvet Underground cover)"	3:10

== Chart performance ==
Chart (2013)	Peak position
Austrian Albums (Ö3 Austria)	8
Belgian Albums (Ultratop Flanders)	24
Belgian Albums (Ultratop Wallonia)	15
French Albums (SNEP)	20
Dutch Albums (Album Top 100)	59
German Albums (Offizielle Top 100)	10
Hungarian Albums (MAHASZ)	7
Italian Albums (FIMI)	59
Irish Albums (IRMA)	59
Scottish Albums (OCC)	4
Spanish Albums (Promusicae)	77
Swedish Albums (Sverigetopplistan)	28
Swiss Albums (Schweizer Hitparade)	4
UK Albums (OCC)	10
UK Album Downloads (OCC)	16
