= Grace/Wastelands =

Studio album by Peter Doherty
- Released: March 13, 2009
- Recorded: 2008
- Studio: Olympic Studios (London)
- Genres: Folk rock; alternative rock
- Length: 41:40
- Labels: EMI (UK/Australia); Astralwerks (US)
- Producer: Stephen Street

Peter Doherty chronology
Oh! What a Lovely Tour (2008)	Grace/Wastelands (2009)	Hamburg Demonstrations (2016)

Singles from Grace/Wastelands
- 1. "Last of the English Roses" Released: 9 March 2009; 2. "Broken Love Song" Released: 3 August 2009

Grace/Wastelands is the debut solo studio album from the Babyshambles frontman and the Libertines co-frontman Peter Doherty. It was released in Australia on 13 March 2009, in the UK on 16 March, and in the US on 24 March, with the single "Last of the English Roses" preceding it by one week. The album features contributions from Blur guitarist Graham Coxon (who plays guitar on all the songs on the album apart from "Broken Love Song") Dot Allison, Peter Wolfe (a.k.a. Wolfman), and members of Babyshambles. Most of the songs have been played live or feature in demo form on leaked sessions.

== History ==
Following famous stints in Babyshambles and the Libertines, Doherty began to play various solo shows throughout the UK. His biggest came on 12 July 2008, where Doherty played a solo gig at the Royal Albert Hall in London. It was his biggest solo show ever but the solo show wasn't received well. According to the critics "whole chunks of the set passed by as listless noodling, with neither Doherty nor the audience appearing to know quite how to behave". The consensus was that – without a full band – Doherty seemed out of place at such a big venue.

However, on 13 January 2009, NME announced that Doherty's solo studio album, entitled Grace/Wastelands would be released on 16 March, preceded by a single, "Last of the English Roses", on 9 March. The website also revealed the track listing of the album and credits.

== Recording and release ==
The original track listing included "Through the Looking Glass" but it was replaced by "I Am the Rain" due to it fitting the vibe of the album more. "Through the Looking Glass" ended up as a B-side to "Last of the English Roses." A preliminary track list for the album also included "Darksome Sea", a song co-written and recorded with Peter Wolfe in Summer 2008, however the song did not end up on the album. Also, the song "1939 Returning" was originally planned to be a duet with Amy Winehouse.

The album was released to positive reviews, despite only reaching #17 on the UK Albums Chart.

== Critical reception ==
Professional ratings
Aggregate scores
Source	Rating
AnyDecentMusic?	6.5/10
Metacritic	74/100
Review scores
Source	Rating
AllMusic	4/5 stars
The A.V. Club	B+
Entertainment Weekly	B+
The Guardian	4/5 stars
The Independent	3/5 stars
NME	7/10
Pitchfork	5.7/10
Q	4/5 stars
Rolling Stone	3/5 stars
Spin	8/10

Initial critical response to Grace/Wastelands was positive. At Metacritic, which assigns a normalized rating out of 100 to reviews from mainstream critics, the album has received an average score of 74, based on 22 reviews. Q wrote that the album, while not Doherty's "defining statement", nonetheless "demolishes the charge that his talent has been fatally squandered". Similarly, Garry Mulholland of The Observer wrote that the album showcases Doherty as an "outstanding singer-songwriter and charismatic poet-vagabond".

Though critics were a lot more fond of the record than Doherty's last two efforts, the album did not sell as well as was expected, particularly in the UK – peaking only at 17 in the UK Top 40.

== Track listing ==
All tracks are written by Pete Doherty.

No.	Title	Writer(s)	Length
1.	"Arcady"		2:53
2.	"Last of the English Roses"		4:59
3.	"1939 Returning"		3:10
4.	"A Little Death Around the Eyes"	Peter Doherty, Carl Barât	3:32
5.	"Salomè"		3:14
6.	"I Am the Rain"	Doherty, John Robinson	3:14
7.	"Sweet By and By"	Doherty, Alan Wass	3:05
8.	"Palace of Bone"		4:24
9.	"Sheepskin Tearaway"	Doherty, Dot Allison	2:43
10.	"Broken Love Song"	Doherty, Peter Wolfe	3:44
11.	"New Love Grows on Trees"		3:38
12.	"Lady Don't Fall Backwards"		2:17
Total length:			40:53

== Personnel ==
- Peter Doherty – acoustic guitar, piano, organ, harmonica, vocals, melodica, artwork, composer
- Trevor Myers – trombone
- John Metcalfe – viola
- Stephen Street – dulcimer, acoustic guitar, harmonium, electric guitar, percussion, programming, background vocals, snare drums, mixing, mellotron, producer, tambourine
- Peter Wolfe – composer, electric guitar
- Dot Allison – vocals
- Sophie Harris – cello
- Tom Stanley – engineer, mixing
- John Robinson – acoustic guitar, vocals
- Andrew Murabito – design, reworking
- Dave Emery – assistant engineer
- Martin Burgess – violin
- Adam Ficek – accordion, cymbals, brushes, drums
- Drew McConnell – bass
- Stephen Large – organ, piano and Vox Continental
- Alize Meurisse – artwork
- Graham Coxon – acoustic and electric guitar
- Benny Cummings – trumpet
- Sally Herbert – violin
- Richard Koster – violin

== Charts ==
Chart (2009)	Peak position
Austrian Albums Chart	11
Belgian Albums Charts (Flanders)	7
Dutch Albums Chart	83
French Albums Chart	7
German Albums Chart	20
Swedish Albums Chart	13
Swiss Albums Chart	10
UK Albums Chart	17
US Billboard Heatseekers	35
