= The Blinding E.P. =

The Blinding EP

EP by Babyshambles
- Released: 4 December 2006
- Recorded: 2006
- Genres: Indie rock, garage punk, garage rock
- Length: 17:32
- Labels: Regal, Parlophone
- Producer: Babyshambles

Babyshambles chronology
Down in Albion (2005)	The Blinding EP (2006)	Shotter's Nation (2007)

Pete Doherty chronology
Down in Albion (2005)	The Blinding EP (2006)	Shotter's Nation (2007)

The Blinding EP is an EP by English indie rock band Babyshambles. It was the band's first release since signing with major record label Parlophone. The EP was released to positive critical reviews on 4 December 2006 in the United Kingdom, by that label's offshoot Regal Records (see 2006 in British music), and on 5 December in the United States, by Capitol Records. The EP entered the official UK Albums Chart at #62 on 11 December 2006, while the title song entered the download chart at #77. A week later, an entry on band's official MySpace blog stated that had a fifth track not been added to make the EP ineligible in the UK Singles Chart, "The Blinding" would have entered that chart at #4. As with their debut album, Pete Doherty designed the artwork for the EP.

Professional ratings
Review scores
Source	Rating
Allmusic	3/5 stars
Drowned in Sound	6/10
Gigwise	4.5/5 stars
inthenews.co.uk	9/10
Pitchfork Media	6.1/10
PlayLouder	3.5/5 stars
PopMatters	8/10 stars
Spin	2.5/5 stars
Stylus Magazine	B
The Independent	3/5 stars

== Track listing ==
All lyrics are written by Pete Doherty; all music is composed by Babyshambles.

No.	Title	Length
1.	"The Blinding"	2:59
2.	"Love You but You're Green"	4:35
3.	"I Wish"	2:47
4.	"Beg, Steal or Borrow"	3:07
5.	"Sedative"	4:04
Total length:		17:32

NME reported in October 2006 that the band had recorded eleven songs including those on the EP, and the following tracks not featured on the EP: "I Can See from Afar", "Anguish", "Stung Me Like Life".

== Music videos ==
=== "The Blinding" ===
The video for "The Blinding" was directed by Julien Temple. It was filmed in a deserted West London subway station/underpass.

The video features the band performing the song in the subway station, or alternatively cooped up in a glass box, with black gaffer tape covering their eyes, all interspersed with random bits and bobs; skulls, a deer, Pete Doherty standing up in an open coffin, a creepy mannequin, "Elvis is dead", a chainsaw and a "blinded" Doherty painting on a wall. Renaissance playwright Christopher Marlowe also makes an appearance. His portrait is stabbed in the eye, as was Christopher Marlowe himself during a bar brawl over the bill—a wound that ended his life. The video culminates in a general mirror and guitar smashing session, including Doherty stabbing a mirror with his own reflection in it. Paul Roundhill and The General make short appearances.

=== "Love You But You're Green" ===
The video for "Love You but You're Green," directed by Julien Temple, features the individual band members playing their instruments, never together but at separate locations. Adam Ficek and his drum kit are perched on a traffic island, Drew McConnell is strumming his double bass by a log fire, Mick Whitnall is in a graveyard and Pete Doherty is hanging around, singing and strumming, in front of a run-down wooden shack and later in front of a pile of tyres in what an old car yard.

Both this song and "The Blinding" were originally written while Peter was in The Libertines; however, it is unclear whether any of the other band members co-wrote them or not.

== Chart performance ==
Chart (2005)	Peak position
UK Albums Chart	62
Japan Singles Chart	147
Danish Singles Chart	5
