= Shotter's Nation =

Studio album by Babyshambles
- Released: 1 October 2007
- Recorded: Olympic Studios, London, England: 2007
- Genre: Indie rock, garage punk, garage rock
- Length: 43:11
- Label: EMI, Parlophone (UK); Astralwerks (US)
- Producer: Stephen Street

Babyshambles chronology
The Blinding EP (2006)	Shotter's Nation (2007)	Oh What a Lovely Tour (2008)

Pete Doherty chronology
The Blinding EP (2006)	Shotter's Nation (2007)	Time for Heroes - The Best of The Libertines (2007)

Singles from Shotter's Nation
- 1. "Delivery" Released: 17 September 2007; 2. "You Talk" Released: 3 December 2007

Shotter's Nation is the second album by English rock band Babyshambles and was released in the United Kingdom on 1 October 2007 by Parlophone to generally favourable reviews. In the United States the album was released on 23 October 2007 by Astralwerks. The first single from the album, "Delivery", was released on 17 September 2007.

The album was produced by Stephen Street and recorded at Olympic Studios in London, England. The acoustic closer, "Lost Art of Murder", features a guest appearance from Bert Jansch.

It is the first Pete Doherty album without Mick Jones producing and his first released by a major label.

In an interview with NME magazine, Pete Doherty said that The Strokes (and solo) guitar player Albert Hammond, Jr., plays guitar on the album. Doherty did not mention the track's name, but did say it was an extremely short three bars of music. A limited edition of the album contains a DVD with a 40-minute track-by-track interview, 5 live songs recorded at the Boogaloo on 5 July 2007, and the music video of "Delivery".

The album's cover painting by Alizé Meurisse is based on the painting The Death of Chatterton by Henry Wallis (1856). It also originally featured an image of Kate Moss, which was replaced with an unknown lookalike.

The song "There She Goes" has been compared to "Lovecats" by The Cure by Garry Mulholland of The Observer. Drew McConnell revealed in interviews that the band wanted the song to sound something like "Walk on the Wild Side" by Lou Reed.

The band promoted the album by appearing in TV and radio shows in France and in the UK. They then played "Delivery" at the MTV EMA. The performance has been widely acclaimed.

There is a video for "French Dog Blues" featuring an animated French Dog. Ian Brown has songwriting credits to the aforementioned song. This is because the song contains a verse from "Deep Pile Dreams", a song from Brown's first album Unfinished Monkey Business.

The album was #14 in NME albums of the year.

== Reception ==
Professional ratings
Aggregate scores
Source	Rating
Metacritic	68/100
Review scores
Source	Rating
Allmusic	3.5/5 stars
Robert Christgau	A−
The Independent	3/5 stars
Irish Independent	4/5 stars
NME	8/10
The Observer	5/5 stars
Rolling Stone	3/5 stars
The Sunday Times	3/5 stars
Time Off	4.5/5 stars
The Times	2/5 stars
Uncut	5/5 stars
Pitchfork	4/10

The album was released to generally favorable reviews.

== Track listing ==
No.	Title	Writer(s)	Length
1.	"Carry On Up the Morning"	Peter Doherty, Michael Whitnall	2:57
2.	"Delivery"	Doherty, Whitnall	2:41
3.	"You Talk"	Doherty, Kate Moss	3:30
4.	"UnBiloTitled"	Doherty, Peter Wolfe, Adam Ficek	3:52
5.	"Side of the Road"	Doherty	2:09
6.	"Crumb Begging Baghead"	Doherty, Whitnall	3:43
7.	"Unstookie Titled"	Doherty, Whitnall, Ficek	4:30
8.	"French Dog Blues"	Doherty, Ian Brown, Moss	3:32
9.	"There She Goes"	Doherty	3:36
10.	"Baddie's Boogie"	Toczek, Doherty, Whitnall, Moss	3:55
11.	"Deft Left Hand"	Doherty, Whitnall, Moss	4:04
12.	"Lost Art of Murder"	Doherty	4:38
Total length:			43:07

=== Limited edition bonus DVD: We Like to Boogaloo ===
- The Boogaloo Tapes (Track by track interview)which actually contains a hidden video (or DVD "easter egg") while the band are talking about the song Crumb Begging Baghead, a French dog appears, and pressing enter selects this video.
- Live at the Boogaloo
1. "Delivery"
2. "Baddie's Boogie"
3. "UnBiloTitled"
4. "There She Goes"
5. "Pipedown"
- "Delivery" (Video)

=== "French" edition bonus DVD: Drew's Birthday: Live à L'Elysée Montmartre ===
- Live at l'Elysee Montmartre recorded on 13 November 2006
1. "Pipedown"
2. "Beg Steal or Borrow"
3. "You Talk"
4. "Sedative"
5. "Killamangiro"
6. "Time for Heroes"
7. "Albion"
8. "Fuck Forever"
9. "The Blinding"
10. "Backstage footage"

It was released on 12 May 2008

== Personnel ==
- Peter Doherty – guitar, vocals, design
- Michael Whitnall – guitar, vocals
- Adam Ficek – drums, percussion, keyboards, vocals
- Drew McConnell – bass guitar, double bass, vocals
- Stephen Large – keyboards on track 4 and 8
- Bert Jansch – guitar on track 12
- Stephen Street – producer, mixing, additional guitar on tracks 11 and 12
- Tom Stanley – engineer
- Mo Hausler – assistant engineer
- Cenzo Townshend – mixing
- Neil Comber – assistant mix engineer
- Traffic – design
- Alizé Meurisse – cover painting
- Todd Korol – cover photograph

== Singles ==
- Delivery (17 June), (2007), (Parlophone) #6
- You Talk (3 December), (2007), (Parlophone) #54

== Charts and certifications ==
=== Weekly charts ===
Chart (2007)	Peak position
Austrian Albums (Ö3 Austria)	14
Belgian Albums (Ultratop Flanders)	45
Belgian Albums (Ultratop Wallonia)	58
French Albums (SNEP)	17
German Albums (Offizielle Top 100)	18
Irish Albums (IRMA)	19
Italian Albums (FIMI)	71
Norwegian Albums (VG-lista)	32
Scottish Albums (OCC)	3
Swedish Albums (Sverigetopplistan)	13
Swiss Albums (Schweizer Hitparade)	29
UK Albums (OCC)	5

=== Year-end charts ===
Chart (2007)	Position
French Albums (SNEP)	188
UK Albums (OCC)	191

=== Certifications ===
Certifications for Shotter's Nation
Region	Certification	Certified units/sales
France (SNEP)	Gold	75,000^{*}
United Kingdom (BPI)	Gold	100,000^{^}
^{*} Sales figures based on certification alone.^{^} Shipments figures based on certification alone.

== See also ==
- Babyshambles discography
