= Peter Wolfe (musician) =

English singer-songwriter (born 1968)

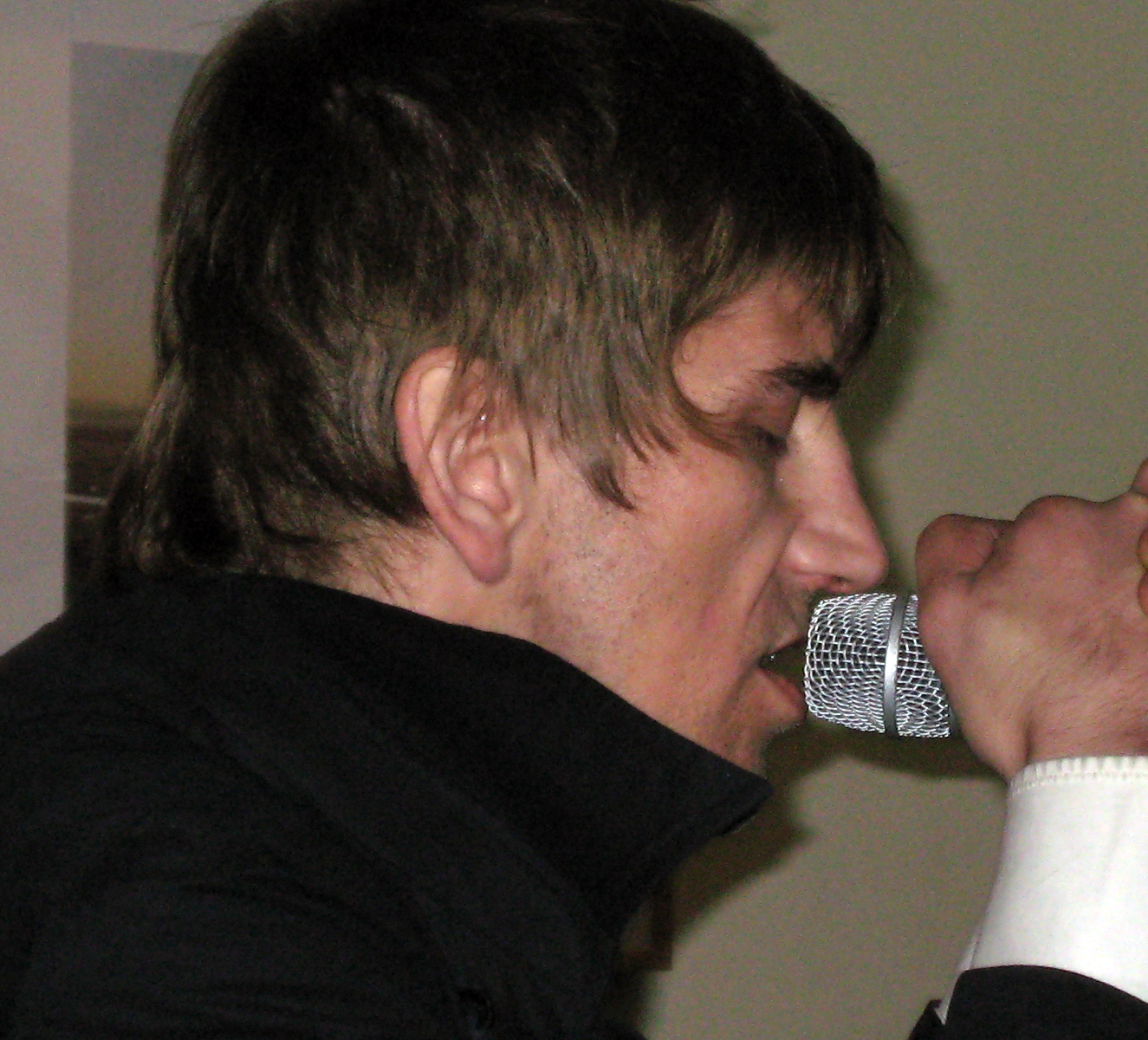

Background information
- Also known as: Wolfman
- Born: Peter Randall; 3 August 1968 (age 57); Tonbridge, Kent, England
- Genres: Indie rock
- Occupations: Musician; songwriter; poet
- Instrument: Vocals
- Years active: 1990–present
- Label: Beyond Bedlam

Peter Wolfe (born Peter Randall, 3 August 1968) also known as Wolfman, is an English musician, and songwriter, best known for his collaborations with Libertines and Babyshambles singer Pete Doherty.

== Career ==
=== Early years ===
Wolfe was born in Tonbridge in 1968, of Irish Gypsy stock. His mother left when he was four and his father, a carpenter, subscribed to the tough-love school of parenting. Wolfe intended to be a professional footballer and spent two months with Gillingham. Leaving school with no O-levels, he became a plumber. At 18 he moved to London and for a short while shared a flat with Shane MacGowan. In the early 1990s, he moved to a flat in Blackstock Road and worked on his career as a musician. However, Wolfe was "relentlessly unsuccessful". Throughout the 1990s Wolfe was regularly in and out of the major recording studios (Island, EMI, and Sony), but failed to secure a recording contract.

=== 2000–present ===
In February 2001, Wolfe was the subject of a film documentary commissioned for The Other Side on Channel Four in the UK. The half-hour film titled, The Greatest Unknown Rock 'n' Roll Star, was directed by filmmaker Andy Lee, who later worked for a year as Wolfe's manager (2006–2007). Later in 2001, Wolfe met Pete Doherty in Islington. They formed a relationship based on songwriting. Wolfe about their relationship: "He turned up at my flat and started hanging around saying he was in a band. He's a great fucking person. Sometimes really awful but sometimes very kind. Maybe he was the first person to look at me through eyes which didn't say, 'This guy's a cunt'."

In 2003, Wolfe recorded "For Lovers" together with Doherty. Wolfe had written the song in the mid 1990s and recorded a demo with his old school friend and musical collaborator, Julian Taylor. Doherty altered the words to one verse, and musicians in Wolfe's band, "The Side Effects", along with record producer Jake Fior made other changes to the arrangement for the single recording. The single was Wolfe's biggest success as musician, reaching No. 7 in the UK Singles Chart. Despite the success of the single, which was nominated for an Ivor Novello Award for songwriting, the pair received relatively little money. Rumours that the publishing rights were sold for "a small amount in a pub" are unfounded, as the rights were shared amongst the musicians who worked without pay on the recording.

On 12 July 2008, Wolfe joined Doherty on stage during his solo show at the Royal Albert Hall and they performed "For Lovers" together. Wolfe's appearance on stage however did not meet critical acclaim. According to one critic the song was "sabotaged" by Wolfe's out-of-tune vocals and lack of charisma. On 16 March 2009, Doherty's solo album, Grace/Wastelands was released. It featured "Broken Love Song", a song co-written with Wolfe. A picture of Wolfe talking to Doherty and a painting of Wolfe appeared in the album art.

Wolfe is listed as a co-writer of various songs for Doherty's band Babyshambles, including "Back from the Dead" and "Sticks and Stones" from Down in Albion, "UnBiloTitled" from Shotter's Nation, and "Stranger in My Own Skin", which appears as a bonus track on Babyshambles' 2013 album Sequel to the Prequel. Wolfe is credited as co-writer of Gunga Din which appeared on the Libertines' 2015 album Anthems for Doomed Youth.

== Personal life ==
Like Doherty, Wolfe has had a long-standing addiction to heroin. On 28 September 2010, Wolfe was charged with possessing and supplying cocaine, whilst Doherty was charged with possession, in a police investigation into the death of documentary filmmaker Robyn Whitehead (also spelled Robin Whitehead), a member of the wealthy Goldsmith family, who overdosed and died in Wolfe's flat. On 20 May 2011, he was sentenced to one year's imprisonment in Pentonville Prison; this was later reduced to eight months on appeal for two counts of possession of cocaine and one count of supplying cocaine linked to this episode.

== Singles ==
=== For Lovers (2004) ===
"For Lovers" (2004) No. 7 UK

=== Napoleon (2004) ===
"Napoleon" (2004) No. 44 UK

=== Ice Cream Guerilla (2005) ===
"Ice Cream Guerilla" is Wolfe's third and least successful single. It was released when he still called himself Wolfman and reached #60 on the UK singles chart.
