= Broken Love Song =

Single by Pete Doherty

from the album Grace/Wastelands
- Released: 3 August 2009
- Recorded: 2008
- Genre: Rock
- Length: 3:42
- Label: Parlophone
- Songwriter(s): Pete Doherty, Peter Wolfe
- Producer(s): Stephen Street

Pete Doherty singles chronology
| "The Last of the English Roses" (2009) | "Broken Love Song" (2009) |

“Broken Love Song” is the second single released from Pete Doherty's debut album, Grace/Wastelands. It was not a commercial success, failing to chart in the UK Singles Chart. It was released on 3 August 2009.

== Track listing ==
1. "Broken Love Song" – 3:42 (Doherty, Peter Wolfe)
2. "The Ballad of Grimaldi" – 4:07 (Doherty)
