= Elviss =

- Origin: London, England
- Genres: Alternative rock
- Years active: 2000–2005
- Labels: Plummit; Universal Music Japan
- Past members: Karl Sunderland; Ed Coonagh; Drew McConnell; Geoff Holroyd; Struan Robertson

Elviss were a West London-based British alternative rock band, who were active during the mid-2000s releasing only one album titled Dead Cat and Sharksick in 2004. The album was due to be released in 2003 after the release of their third single "Radio (Kill It)", but it was put back until the band had a hit single. It ultimately was never released in their homeland but was released in Japan on 21 April 2004 with a retail price of 2,200 Yen. The UK release was due to be 11 tracks only, but the Japanese version had 12 with "Orange Glow" as a bonus track.

The band's name was a reference to the Enhanced Low light level and Visible Surveillance System (ELVISS). During their brief career, they opened for Feeder at a Kerrang!-sponsored gig and also opened for Stone Sour. They were also championed by the magazine itself, which included an appearance at the Kerrang! Weekender in 2002 at Camber Sands, East Sussex. The intro of their Deadcat and Sharksick track "Tantrum", was used as an indents soundbed on Kerrang!'s music channel in 2003.

The band who were originally composed of Karl Sunderland (vocals), Ed Coonagh (guitar), Geoff Holroyd (drums) and Drew McConnell (bass), released three singles titled "S.K.P.", "D-Change" (with their first music video shot in Ladbrook Grove, London and was Jo Whiley's "Single of the Week" on her Radio 1 show) both in 2002 and "Radio (Kill It)" in 2003, with the last two of these charting at No. 170 and No. 89 in that order. These singles were followed up by the release of their "Dead Cat and Sharksick" (EP), which was essentially a 5-track sampler for the album before the release of a 3-track EP in late 2004 titled "Not Enough", which also seen Struan Robertson on bass after McConnell left the band to later join Babyshambles. Elviss were later dropped by their label, several months after the release of this EP.

The band were signed to Plummet Records, a little-known record label who were part of EMAP, while being signed to Universal in Japan. EMAP's part of the deal was providing financial support and publicity. "D-Change" was included on a Kerrang! compilation CD while its video was included on a DVD free with the magazine, due to being played on their music channel at the time.

Since the group split in early 2005, Karl Sunderland and Ed Coonagh are now in a 3-piece band called The Resistors while Drew McConnell later joined Babyshambles, remaining a member until their 2014 split. He is now a member of Liam Gallagher's touring band.

The Resistors are signed to their own label Lash Records and have over 1.8 million plays on their MySpace page. An episode of CSI: Miami being the 11th episode from season 8 titled "Delko for the Defense", features their song "Sober" in one of its scenes. Holroyd is currently Feeder's drummer whenever they perform live, but has contributed to them in the studio, while Robertson is guitarist with post-punk band, Fast Boyfriends.

== Discography ==
=== Album ===
- Dead Cat and Sharksick (2004, Japan only)

=== Singles ===
- "S.K.P." (2002)
- "D-Change" (2002) – No. 170 (UK)
- "Radio (Kill It)" (2003) – No. 89 (UK)

=== Extended plays ===
- Dead Cat and Sharksick (EP) (2003)
- Not Enough (EP) (2004)

== Members ==
- Karl Sunderland – lead vocalist
- Ed Coonagh – guitarist
- Geoff Holroyd – drummer
- Drew McConnell – bassist (until 2004)
- Struan Robertson – bassist (2004–2005)
