= Killamangiro =

Single by Babyshambles

from the album Down in Albion (Re-recorded)
- Released: 29 November 2004
- Genre: Post-punk revival
- Length: 3:26
- Label: Rough Trade
- Songwriter: Pete Doherty
- Producer: Paul Epworth

Babyshambles singles chronology
"Babyshambles" (2004)	"Killamangiro" (2004)	"Fuck Forever" (2005)

Down In Albion track listing
- 1. "La Belle et la Bête"; 2. "Fuck Forever"; 3. "A'Rebours"; 4. "The 32nd of December"; 5. "Pipedown"; 6. "Sticks and Stones"; 7. "Killamangiro"; 8. "8 Dead Boys"; 9. "In Love With a Feeling"; 10. "Pentonville"; 11. "What Katy Did Next"; 12. "Albion"; 13. "Back From the Dead"; 14. "The Loyalty Song"; 15. "Up the Morning"; 16. "Merry Go Round"

"Killamangiro" is a song by English band, Babyshambles, released in November 2004 through Rough Trade Records. It achieved respectable chart success, peaking at #8 on the UK Singles Chart.

The song itself is recognised for guitarist Patrick Walden's "messy" style of play and frontman Pete Doherty's distinctive vocals. It is a regular feature of live setlists by the band and is one of their most popular and well known songs.

The title is a pun on the name of Mount Kilimanjaro in Tanzania, and further mixes in the song's lyrics about "kill[ing] a man for his giro" – a bank deposit method often associated with British unemployment benefits.

The track was released as a single, and subsequently included on the album Down in Albion with different production (Mick Jones) and a different drummer (Adam Ficek) from the original. The circumstances of the recording of the song for the album were remarked upon by Babyshambles bass player Drew McConnell on 5 November 2005 in the New Musical Express:

"We weren't planning on having 'Killamangiro' on there. We got in the room and thought, "Let's run through 'Killamangiro'", but sneaky Mick pressed record. Pete was jumping over the desk and giving the engineer a heart attack. Pete's got a thing about not releasing tracks more than once. People have written that we can't play our instruments and that's really not true because this is completely live."

"Killamangiro" is the only track by Doherty to be produced by Paul Epworth.

== Music video ==
The video for "Killamangiro" features orange tinted live footage of the band on stage, with snippets of Doherty walking down a street, out of a shop, mock hanging himself with his mic cord, flicking through a magazine, and driving along in a car (complete with a Christmas tree air freshener). Footage was also shot at the Underground Club in Stoke-on-Trent.

== Track listing ==
- CD rtradscd201
1. "Killamangiro"
2. "Man Who Came To Stay"
3. "Killamangiro" (Video)
- 7" rtrads201
1. "Killamangiro"
2. "Man Who Came To Stay"

== Chart performance ==
Chart (2004)	Peak position
Irish Singles Chart	40
Scottish Singles Sales (Official Charts)	8
UK Singles Chart	8
UK Indie (Official Charts)	1
