= Napoleon (Peter Wolfe song) =

Single by Peter Wolfe
- Released: November 15, 2004
- Length: 6:48
- Label: Beyond Bedlam
- Songwriter(s): Peter Wolfe w/D. El-mezoghi

Peter Wolfe singles chronology
"For Lovers" (2004)	"Napoleon" (2004)	"Ice Cream Guerilla" (2004)

"Napoleon" is the second single by Peter Wolfe. Unlike his debut "For Lovers", the reception for "Napoleon" was mixed; particular criticism was levelled at Wolfman's singing, described as "mo-no-tone ratatat". The single reached number forty-four in the UK Singles Chart.

== Track listing ==
=== CD ===
1. "Napoleon"
2. "From The Darkness"
3. "Napoleon" (Radio Edit)

=== 7" ===
1. "Napoleon"
2. "From The Darkness"
