= Fuck Forever =

2005 single by Babyshambles

- Japanese artwork

Single by Babyshambles

from the album Down in Albion
- B-side: "East of Eden", "Babyshamble", "Monkey Casino", "Black Boy Lane"
- Released: 15 August 2005
- Genre: Indie rock
- Length: 4:38
- Label: Rough Trade
- Songwriters: Pete Doherty, Patrick Walden
- Producer: Mick Jones

Babyshambles singles chronology
"Killamangiro" (2004)	"Fuck Forever" (2005)	"Albion" (2005)

Down in Albion track listing
- 1. "La Belle et la Bête"; 2. "Fuck Forever"; 3. "A'Rebours"; 4. "The 32nd of December"; 5. "Pipedown"; 6. "Sticks and Stones"; 7. "Killamangiro"; 8. "8 Dead Boys"; 9. "In Love with a Feeling"; 10. "Pentonville"; 11. "What Katy Did Next"; 12. "Albion"; 13. "Back from the Dead"; 14. "The Loyalty Song"; 15. "Up the Morning"; 16. "Merry Go Round"

"Fuck Forever" is a song by English rock band Babyshambles. It was released as a single on 15 August 2005 and is their highest-charting single, peaking at number four on the UK Singles Chart. The song was negatively targeted due to its controversial title and lyrics, but it was eventually released and has become the closing number in the band's live sets. In May 2007, NME placed "Fuck Forever" at number 24 on its list of the "50 Greatest Indie Anthems Ever", while in 2014, the same publication named it the 245th greatest song of all time.

== Music video ==
The video was directed by Jez Murrell. Most of the promotional video for Babyshambles' second single was filmed on location at Spitalfields City Farm in east London, in June 2005.

At the beginning of the video, Kate Moss makes a cameo appearance, which is followed by a segment featuring Patrick Walden talking to a girl in a cinema ticket booth in the style of a foreign film, complete with subtitles and fluttering animated hearts. The farm segment features a sharp suited and booted band milling around miming to the song, miscellaneous farm animals, goats running around, Union Jack–draped and pork pie hat–wearing donkeys and Pete Doherty twirling around wrapped in a Union Jack. The video ends with Walden and the mysterious cinema girl meeting up at the "Victoria Palace Gates," sharing a kiss and romantically wandering off into the distance.

== Track listings ==
UK CD1 (RTRADSCDX210)

1. "Fuck Forever" (original)
2. "East of Eden"
3. "Babyshamble"
4. "Fuck Forever" (video)

UK CD2 (RTRADSCD210)

1. "Fuck Forever" (original)
2. "Monkey Casino"

UK 7-inch single (RTRADS210)

A. "Fuck Forever" (original)
B. "Black Boy Lane"

Australian CD single (RTRADSCD210)

1. "Fuck Forever" (original)
2. "Fuck Forever" (original clean)
3. "Black Boy Lane"
4. "Monkey Casino"
5. "East of Eden"
6. "Babyshambles"

Japanese maxi-CD EP (TOCP-61105)

1. "Fuck Forever" (original version)
2. "Black Boy Lane"
3. "Monkey Casino"
4. "East of Eden"
5. "Babyshambles"
6. "Fuck Forever" (original version clean)
7. "Fuck Forever" (video)

== Charts ==
Chart (2005)	Peak position
Australia (ARIA)	76
Europe (Eurochart Hot 100)	17
Ireland (IRMA)	22
Scotland Singles (OCC)	4
UK Singles (OCC)	4
UK Indie (OCC)	1

== Release history ==
Region	Date	Format(s)	Label(s)	Ref.
United Kingdom	15 August 2005	7-inch vinyl; CD	Rough Trade	
Australia	29 August 2005	CD	Rough Trade	
Japan	22 September 2005	EP/mini-album	Rough Trade	
