= Down in Albion =

Studio album by Babyshambles
- Released: 14 November 2005
- Recorded: 2005
- Studios: Twin Peaks Studio; Metropolis Studios
- Genres: Indie rock, garage punk, garage rock
- Length: 63:49
- Label: Rough Trade
- Producer: Mick Jones

Babyshambles chronology
Down in Albion (2005)	The Blinding EP (2006)

Pete Doherty chronology
The Libertines (2004)	Down in Albion (2005)	The Blinding EP (2006)

Singles from Down in Albion
- 1. "Fuck Forever" Released: 15 August 2005; 2. "Albion" Released: 28 November 2005

Professional ratings
Aggregate scores
Source	Rating
Metacritic	56/100
Review scores
Source	Rating
AllMusic	2.5/5 stars
Blender	2.5/5 stars
The Guardian	3/5 stars
The Independent	4/5 stars
Mojo	2/5 stars
NME	7/10
Pitchfork	7.7/10
Q	2/5 stars
Rolling Stone	3/5 stars
Spin	B−

Down in Albion is the debut album by English rock band Babyshambles.

Down in Albion was released on 14 November 2005 on Rough Trade Records, although it was leaked on the Internet on 19 October 2005. Produced by Mick Jones, Down in Albion contains a re-recorded version of their second single "Killamangiro" as well as a reggae track, "Pentonville". The influence of The Clash has been noted on songs such as "À rebours" and "The 32nd of December". The inclusion of "Albion" is controversial among fans, due to the song's history as a fan favorite from the days of The Libertines.

The first track, "La Belle et la Bête" (French for "Beauty and the Beast"), features the vocals of Doherty's then-girlfriend Kate Moss, and "Pentonville" was written by Doherty and The General, a friend he met whilst an inmate in Pentonville Prison. The album was seen as a move away from The Libertines' style of music.

The artwork for the album was created by Doherty.

== Track listing ==
All tracks are written by Pete Doherty, unless otherwise stated.

No.	Title	Writer(s)	Length
1.	"La Belle et la Bête" (featuring Kate Moss)	Pete Doherty, Rob Chevalley, Peter Wolfe	5:05
2.	"Fuck Forever"	Doherty, Patrick Walden	4:37
3.	"À rebours"		3:23
4.	"The 32nd of December"		3:08
5.	"Pipedown"	Doherty, Walden	2:35
6.	"Sticks and Stones"	Doherty, Peter Wolfe	4:51
7.	"Killamangiro"		3:13
8.	"8 Dead Boys"	Doherty, Walden	4:16
9.	"In Love with a Feeling"	Doherty, Walden	2:51
10.	"Pentonville" (featuring The General)	General Santana	3:49
11.	"What Katy Did Next"	Doherty, Alan Wass	3:07
12.	"Albion"		5:24
13.	"Back from the Dead"	Doherty, Wolfe	2:52
14.	"Loyalty Song"	Doherty, Walden	3:32
15.	"Up the Morning"	Doherty, Walden	5:43
16.	"Merry Go Round"		5:22

== Personnel ==
- Peter Doherty – vocals, guitar, artwork
- Patrick Walden – lead guitar
- Adam Ficek – drums
- Drew McConnell – bass guitar
- Kate Moss – vocals on track 1
- General Santana – vocals on track 10
- Barriemore Barlow – gong on track 6

Technical

- Mick Jones – producer
- Bill Price – mixing, recorded by
- Adam Fuest – recorded by
- Iain Gore – recorded by
- Daniel Parry – assistant engineer
- George Williams – assistant engineer
- Matt Paul – assistant engineer
- Jeff Teader – layout
- Hedi Slimane – photos

== Singles ==
- Killamangiro (11 November), (2004), (Rough Trade) UK #8
- Fuck Forever (15 August), (2005), (Rough Trade) UK #4
- Albion (28 November), (2005), (Rough Trade) UK #8

== Chart performance ==
Chart (2005)	Providers	Peak position
UK Albums Chart	BPI/The Official Charts Company	10
European Top 100 Albums	-	32
French Albums Chart	SNEP/IFOP	72
German Albums Chart	Media Control	46
Irish Albums Chart	IRMA	28
Swedish Albums Chart	GLF	46
Italian Albums Chart	FIMI	99
Swiss Albums Chart	Media Control	93
Chart (2006)	Providers	Peak position
Austrian Albums Chart	Media Control	52

== See also ==
- Babyshambles discography
