= Albion (song) =

Single by Babyshambles

from the album Down in Albion
- Released: 28 November 2005
- Genre: Indie rock
- Length: 3:28
- Label: Rough Trade
- Songwriter: Pete Doherty
- Producer: Mick Jones

Babyshambles singles chronology
"Fuck Forever" (2005)	"Albion" (2005)	"Janie Jones" (2006)

Alternative cover

Down In Albion track listing
- 1. "La Belle et la Bête"; 2. "Fuck Forever"; 3. "A'Rebours"; 4. "The 32nd of December"; 5. "Pipedown"; 6. "Sticks and Stones"; 7. "Killamangiro"; 8. "8 Dead Boys"; 9. "In Love With a Feeling"; 10. "Pentonville"; 11. "What Katy Did Next"; 12. "Albion"; 13. "Back From the Dead"; 14. "The Loyalty Song"; 15. "Up the Morning"; 16. "Merry Go Round"

"Albion" is a song by English band Babyshambles. It was released as the third single from Down in Albion on 28 November 2005 in the UK. The single was released in Japan on 8 March 2006 by Reservoir Records/EMI.

"Albion" deals primarily with the concept of Albion, thought of as a mythical England (or Great Britain), the landscape and life of which is referred to throughout the song. This idea was central to The Libertines and still is to Babyshambles. The song was the first acoustic song Babyshambles released. The song had been used in The Libertines live sets, and thus there was some controversy from fans when it was released. It is always one of the highlights of Babyshambles live shows. The "Albion" is also a recurrent theme in Pete Doherty's music and poetry. A lot of songs contain the word "Albion" in their lyrics: in The Libertines' "Love on the Dole", "Bucket Shop" (both from the Legs 11 Session), "The Good Old Days" (from their debut album Up The Bracket), and in Babyshambles' "Merry-Go-Round" (from their debut album Down In Albion). Most of The Libertines fans discovered the song "Albion" in the 2003 Babyshambles Sessions.

The song's lyrical quality is a reflection of its origin, a poem penned by Doherty when he was 16 (according to Babyshambles bass player Drew McConnell's remark in the 5 November 2005 NME track-by-track guide to Down in Albion, it was the first song Doherty wrote). The lyrics were praised on an episode of Newsnight Review, when critics were reviewing Babyshambles' debut album Down In Albion. The single version differs from the album cut, where the song proper is preceded by a minute-long noise (thought to incorporate the sound of a Hammond organ warming up).

== Music video ==
The promotional video for "Albion" was directed by Roger Pomphrey and features a variety of live, fly on the wall and backstage footage of the band. Some of the footage shows Pete Doherty and former manager, James Mullord, together. However, due to Doherty's alleged grievances against him, the record label ordered that Mullord be digitally erased from the video; hence when he and Doherty are shown arriving in Trafalgar Square for the Love Music Hate Racism gig in May 2005, Mullord's face is pixelated. At the end of the video, Doherty is seen walking into the distance with his former manager.

Other footage shows glimpses of Kate Moss with Doherty, embracing on the edge of a river bank, as seen previously in the Who the Fuck is Pete Doherty documentary. Doherty is also seen standing up, attempting to thumb a ride from a passing speed boat.

== Track listing ==
- CD Single RTRADSCD260
1. "Albion" (single version)
2. "Do You Know Me"
- CD Maxi Single RTRADSCDX260
1. "Albion" (single version)
2. "My Darling Clementine"
3. "Why Did You Break My Heart/Piracy"
4. "Albion" (Video)
5. "Bonus Footage" (Albion Acoustic)
- 7" RTRADS260
1. "Albion" (single version)
2. "Wolfman"
- Japanese Maxi CD TOCP-66533
1. "Albion" (single version)
2. "My Darling Clementine"
3. "Why Did You Break My Heart/Piracy"
4. "Wolfman"
5. "Do You Know Me"
6. "Albion" (Video)
7. "Bonus Footage" (Albion Acoustic)

== Chart performance ==
Chart (2005)	Peak position
UK Singles Chart	8
UK Indie Singles Chart	1
