= Delivery (song) =

2007 single by Babyshambles

Single by Babyshambles

from the album Shotter's Nation
- Released: 17 September 2007
- Recorded: 2007
- Genre: Indie rock, post-Britpop
- Length: 2:42
- Label: EMI
- Songwriter(s): Peter Doherty, Michael Whitnall
- Producer(s): Stephen Street

Babyshambles singles chronology
"Janie Jones" (2006)	"Delivery" (2007)	"You Talk" (2007)

Shotter's Nation track listing
- 1. "Carry On Up The Morning"; 2. "Delivery"; 3. "You Talk"; 4. "UnBiloTitled"; 5. "Side of the Road"; 6. "Crumb Begging Baghead"; 7. "Unstookie Titled"; 8. "French Dog Blues"; 9. "There She Goes"; 10. "Baddie's Boogie"; 11. "Deft Left Hand"; 12. "Lost Art of Murder"

"Delivery" is a song by the English band Babyshambles. It is the second track on the band's second album called Shotter's Nation. The song first appeared in demo form (being given away for free on the internet). On 19 August NME announced it would be giving away a free copy of the demo on 7" vinyl on the week of 12 September.

It has been released as a single on 17 September 2007 on EMI.

Pete Doherty designed the artwork for the single.

The Q magazine has rated Delivery n°1 of the 50 Essential Songs (Q50) of month of September. Delivery was also The Track Of The Week in the issue of the NME with Pete Doherty on the cover in August.

== Music video ==
The video has been directed by Douglas Hart. The video premiered on Channel 4 on Saturday 18 August 2007 at 12:12 am.

The entire video has a monochrome look and was shot on colour stock, Super 8 and high contrast black and white 35mm film. The video mainly features a miming Doherty pacing purposely down the middle of a deserted city street, dark suited and fedora hatted.

The pace of the video speeds up, with rhythmic freeze frames and zooms, as it cuts between Doherty and McConnell, Whitnall and Ficek – who are seen driving a Jaguar. The video also features Doherty playing around with his hair in front of a mirror. One of Doherty's kittens gets a look in at one point during the video and a quick glimpse of Doherty's new "Astile" tattoo is seen. The video culminates with all the band members taking an upbeat night-time city tour from their Jaguar car.

== Track listing ==
- Maxi CD CDRS 6747
1. "Delivery"
2. "Stone Me"
3. "I Wish" (Mik's Vocal Version)
4. "Delivery" (Video)
- CD CDR 6747
1. "Delivery"
2. "A Day Out in New Brighton"
- 7" R 6747
1. "Delivery"
2. "Torn"

== Charts ==
Chart (2007)	Peak position
Belgium (Ultratip Bubbling Under Flanders)	11
France (SNEP)	84
Ireland (IRMA)	42
Scotland (OCC)	2
Sweden (Sverigetopplistan)	52
UK Singles (OCC)	6
