= The Last of the English Roses =

Single by Peter Doherty

from the album Grace/Wastelands
- Released: 9 March 2009
- Recorded: 2008
- Studio: Olympic Studios (London)
- Genre: Alternative rock
- Length: 3:57
- Label: Parlophone
- Songwriter(s): Peter Doherty
- Producer(s): Stephen Street

Peter Doherty singles chronology
"Prangin' Out" (2006)	"The Last of the English Roses" (2009)	"Broken Love Song" (2009)

Music video
- "The Last of the English Roses" on YouTube

"The Last of the English Roses" is the debut solo single by the English musician Peter Doherty. The single is the first from his debut solo studio album Grace/Wastelands (2009).

The single was released on 9 March 2009 and reached 67 in the UK singles chart. The song was also performed on Friday Night with Jonathan Ross.

== Track listing ==
1. "Last of the English Roses"
2. "Through the Looking Glass"
3. "Don't Look Back"
4. "Salome" (Acoustic)

== Charts ==
Chart (2009)	Peak position
UK Singles (OCC)	67
