= For Lovers =

Single by Wolfman featuring Peter Doherty
- Released: 12 April 2004
- Genre: Indie
- Length: 3:50
- Label: Rough Trade
- Songwriters: Peter Wolfe, Julian Taylor, Pete Doherty, Matt White, Maff Scott, Ned Scott
- Producers: Jake Fior, Dillon Gallagher

Peter Wolfe singles chronology
"For Lovers" (2004)	"Napoleon" (2004)

Pete Doherty singles chronology
"For Lovers" (2004)	"Their Way" (2005)

"For Lovers" is the debut single by Wolfman featuring Pete Doherty. The single reached No. 7 in the UK singles chart.

In 2005, the song was nominated for an Ivor Novello Award for songwriting.

== Track listing ==
=== CD ===
1. "For Lovers"
2. "Back From The Dead"
3. "For Lovers" (Video)

=== 7" ===
1. "For Lovers"
2. "Back From The Dead"

== Chart performance ==
Chart (2004)	Peak position
UK Singles Chart	7
UK Indie (Official Charts)	1
