= The Suffrajets =

British all girl rock band

The Suffrajets were a British all girl four-piece rock band formed by Alex Gillings and Gemma Clarke. The last line-up was Alex Gillings (rhythm guitar), Gemma Clarke (drums), Claire Wakeman (lead guitar, vocals) and Lulu Small (bass). The band split in March 2007. The band signed their first record contract with Poolside Records via Sony when the girls were 17 years old. After signing with Sony, the band toured Los Angeles and recorded their debut album with producer Greg Hampton.
