= Gemma Clarke =

British musician

Gemma Clarke is a musician, who was previously the drummer for the Suffrajets, the Krak and Babyshambles and Adam Ant. Her family owns a rehearsal studio in Old Street, called Rooz Studios, and a venue in Holloway Road called Nambucca.

Clarke is currently the drummer in an indie grunge band called JW Paris.

== Babyshambles ==
For a year, Clarke played drums for the ex-Libertine Pete Doherty's band Babyshambles. She left in January 2005, citing disagreements with the management.

After leaving the band, she wrote an open letter which read as follows:

"Dear Peter, I would like to make it very clear about my reasons for making the stand that I have. I will not continue to work under the management that you have chosen for the band as I could no longer be part of a machine that I feel is destroying you. I love you, the music, Patrick, Dru and Babyshambles. Please be safe and be careful. You are a great artist and have been a massive inspiration to me. Thanks for the experience and for a great time – keep safe and don't forget to call me...good luck for the future.

xxxgemmaxxxx"

Clarke drummed on early Babyshambles tracks, including the single version of "Killamangiro" and its B-side "The Man Who Came To Stay". She also attended the band's XFM session in December 2004, played on the Zane Lowe recordings of 27 October 2004 ("Fuck Forever", "Do You Know Me" and "My Darling Clementine") and made a few television appearances with the band including Top of the Pops, CD:UK, Hero2Hero and on Tim Lovejoy's Allstars show.

== The Suffrajets ==
Before and after her time in Babyshambles, Clarke toured with the Suffrajets. They released four singles in 2005/2006. "Sold" was released in May 2005, with "Everything You Do" following in October. "Going Nowhere" was released on 27 March 2006. Their next single "Worthy" was released on 26 June 2006. Their album Crooked Mile' went on release in September 2006, only available via their website. After spending 12 years with the Suffrajets, and co-founding the band, the group eventually split in 2007.

== The Krak ==
After The Suffrajets split, Clarke played drums in a band called The Krak, who toured and most of Europe including Belgium, France and Luxembourg. They released two singles: 'Madame Riviere' (through Militant Entertainment) in June 2008 and double A-side 'School Disco (the kazoo song)/Estate Dwelling' in June 2009 (via notonyourradio records). The Krak also had extensive press and media coverage, playing guerilla gigs in shops, in London Zoo Gorilla enclosure, Space-hopping on the millennium bridge and the Orient Express... They played at Glastonbury 2008 and made a collaboration with indie/rock band The Sea, doing a cover version of well known 'Out of Space' by The Prodigy. They made a video for this track, which includes footage of the Glastonbury performance. They also headlined London venue The Scala in January 2009.

== Later work ==
The Krak split in October 2009 and Clarke put together new project Spitfire in January 2010 (with two previous members of The Krak; Tom Lattimer and Tom Keane). The band did a one-week tour in Ireland and England. In March 2012, Clarke formed a dance-punk band with fellow musicians Laura Le Rox, Josefine Jonsson, Mercedes Di'Ett and Rosie Bans, entitled Her Majesty. The band played a number of gigs under that name including some in Amsterdam (supporting Florida Room at The Winston on Saturday 29 September 2012), until November 2012 that year when the band separated.

She has recently taken up writing, and her article, entitled "For the love of music" was published in Louder Than Bombs magazine.

In September 2021, Clarke played drums for JWParis at Luton's Castlefest, who she currently remains with.
