= You Talk =

Single by Babyshambles

from the album Shotter's Nation
- B-side: "Revelations"
- Released: 3 December 2007
- Genre: Indie, Rock
- Length: 3:30
- Label: Parlophone
- Songwriters: Peter Doherty, Kate Moss
- Producer: Stephen Street

Babyshambles singles chronology
"Delivery" (2007)	"You Talk" (2007)

Shotter's Nation track listing
- 1. "Carry On Up The Morning"; 2. "Delivery"; 3. "You Talk"; 4. "UnBiloTitled"; 5. "Side of the Road"; 6. "Crumb Begging Baghead"; 7. "Unstookie Titled"; 8. "French Dog Blues"; 9. "There She Goes"; 10. "Baddie's Boogie"; 11. "Deft Left Hand"; 12. "Lost Art of Murder"

"You Talk" is a song by English indie rock band Babyshambles. It is the third track and the second single from the band's second album Shotter's Nation. The single was released on 3 December 2007, reaching number 54 on the UK Singles Chart after its first week on general sale. "You Talk" is the Babyshambles' lowest placing single so far.

The video for the single has been shot in Somerset on 21 October 2007.

Pete Doherty designed the artwork for the single which using his own blood.

The acoustic versions of the songs "Carry On Up The Morning" and "UnBiloTitled" appearing as B-sides for the CD are from the Stookie + Jim – BumFest Demos.

Pete Doherty stated in a Rolling Stone interview that it started out as a certain Velvet Underground song, The Velvet Underground song "Walk and Talk" is most likely what he is referring to.

== Music video ==
The music video has been directed by Douglas Hart.

It features the band, getting back to nature, strolling through an autumnal Savernake forest, gazing skywards. The scene switches to a dark, crowded and somewhat claustrophobic room. There is a party going on, under a swinging, interrogation type lamp, with a group of men in business suits and the band. At various stages, Doherty appears to be flat on his back, as he observes this gathering.

There is a dark and light theme throughout the clip, with the band seen in the darkness of the forest at first and then later in the video, out in the open, in the bright sunlight.

== Track listing ==
- 7" R 6750
1. "You Talk"
2. "Revelations"
- CD CDR 6750
1. "You Talk"
2. "UnBiloTitled" (acoustic)
3. "Carry On Up the Morning" (acoustic)

== Chart performance ==
Chart (2007)	Peak position
UK Singles Chart	54
