= Babyshambles (song) =

Single by Babyshambles
- Released: April 2004
- Genre: Indie, rock
- Label: High Society Records
- Songwriter: Alan Hammonds

Babyshambles singles chronology
"Babyshambles" (2004)	"Killamangiro" (2004)

"Babyshambles" is the first single by English rock band Babyshambles. It was released in April 2004 on High Society Records. The single was limited to 2,000 copies of the CD and 1,000 copies of the 7" vinyl. It peaked at number No. 32 on the UK Singles Chart.

== Track listing ==
- CD
1. "Babyshambles"
2. "Flophouse"
3. "What Katie did"
- 7"
1. "Babyshambles"
2. "Flophouse"

== Chart performance ==
Chart (2004)	Peak position
Scotland Singles (OCC)	41
UK Singles Chart	32
UK Indie (OCC)	2
