= Pete Doherty =

English musician (born 1979)

Peter Doherty
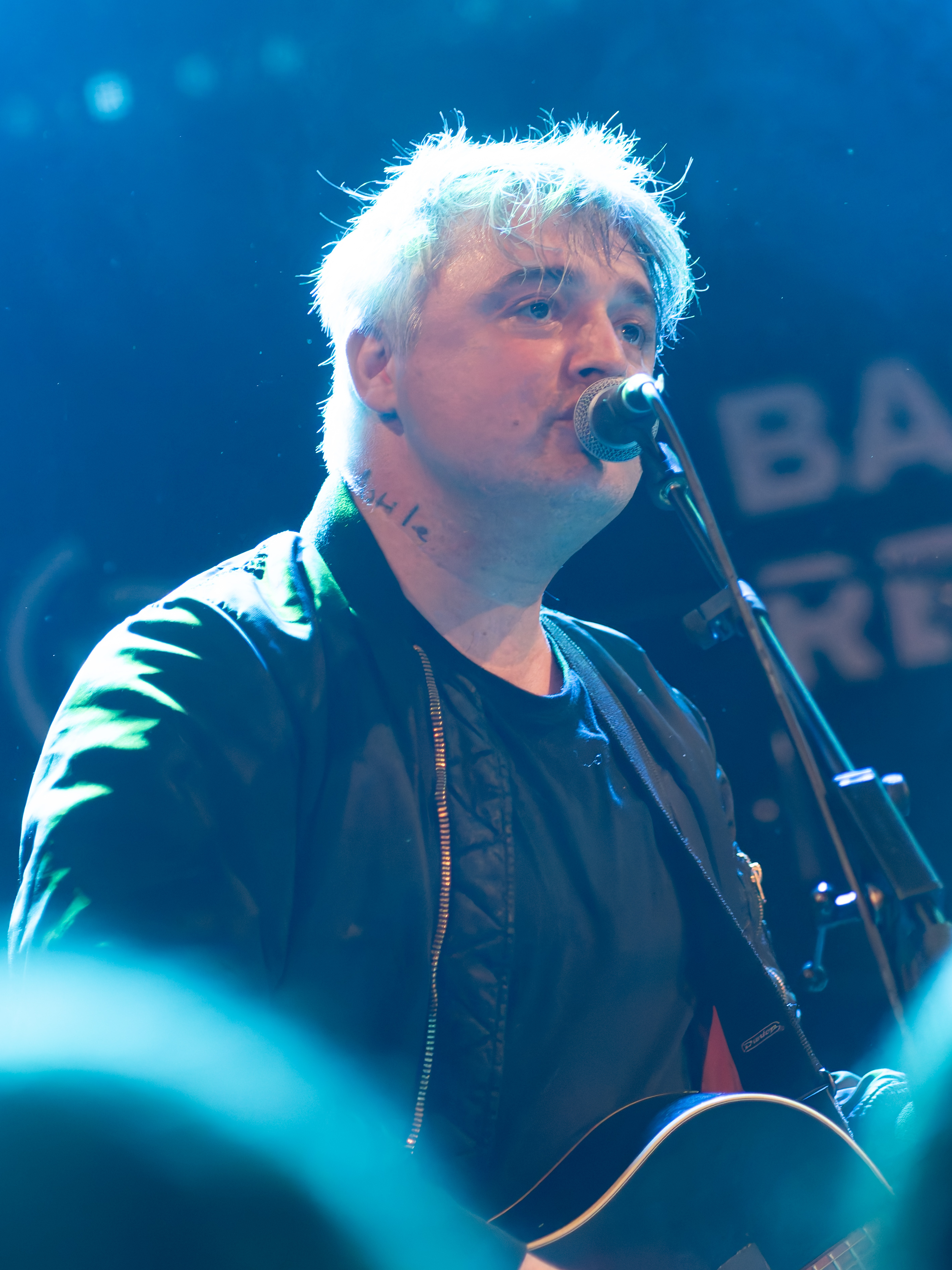
- Doherty performing in 2024

Background information
- Born: Peter Doherty; 12 March 1979 (age 47); Hexham, Northumberland, England
- Genres: Indie rock; post-punk; garage rock
- Occupations: Musician; singer; songwriter
- Instruments: Vocals; guitar; bass guitar; harmonica; melodica; piano; organ
- Years active: 1997–present
- Labels: Rough Trade; Silvertone; EMI; Astralwerks; Clouds Hill; High Society; Strap Originals
- Member of: The Libertines; Peter Doherty and the Puta Madres; Babyshambles
- Spouse: Katia de Vidas (m. 2021)
- Website: peterdoherty.strap-originals.com

Peter Doherty (born 12 March 1979) is an English musician. He is best known for being co-frontman of the Libertines, which he formed with Carl Barât in 1997. His other musical projects are indie bands Babyshambles and Peter Doherty and the Puta Madres. Doherty is known both for his music and for his turbulent personal life and drug problems.

== Early life ==
Peter Doherty was born in Hexham, Northumberland on 12 March 1979. His father, Peter John Doherty, was a major in the Royal Signals, while his mother, Jacqueline Michels, was a lance-corporal in Queen Alexandra's Royal Army Nursing Corps. His paternal grandfather was Irish from Cheekpoint in County Waterford. His maternal grandfather was Jewish, and was the son of immigrants who hailed from France and Russia, respectively. He was raised Catholic. He grew up at a number of army garrisons across Britain and continental Europe with his sisters, AmyJo and Emily.

Doherty was the second of the three children. While living in Dorset, aged 11, Doherty began playing guitar, originally in an attempt to impress a female classmate, Emily Baker. He achieved 11 GCSEs, 7 of which were A* grades, at Nicholas Chamberlaine Comprehensive School in Bedworth, North Warwickshire, and four passes at A-Level, two at grade A. At the age of 16, he won a poetry competition and embarked on a tour of Russia organised by the British Council.

After his A-levels, he moved to his grandmother's flat in London – where he said he felt 'destined' to be – and got a job filling graves in Willesden Cemetery, although most of his time was spent reading and writing while sitting on gravestones. In a clip later available on YouTube, an 18-year-old Doherty can be seen in an interview with MTV, on the day of the release of Oasis' third studio album Be Here Now (1997). He attended Queen Mary, a college of the University of London, to study English literature, but left the course after his first year. After leaving university, he moved into a London flat with friend and fellow musician Carl Barât, who had been a classmate of Doherty's older sister, Amy-Jo, at Brunel University. The pair met when Amy-Jo tasked Barât with 'babysitting' Doherty whilst she attended a night class.

== Career ==
=== The Libertines ===
Doherty and Barât formed a band called the Libertines in the late 1990s, although it was not until 2002, with the release of their debut studio album Up the Bracket, that they began to achieve widespread mainstream success.

The group achieved critical and commercial success and gained a dedicated cult following, with Doherty, in particular, being praised by fans and critics alike as one of the most promising songwriters to emerge on the British music scene for some time. However, Doherty's increasing drug problems led to his estrangement from the band. In 2003, he was jailed for burgling Barât's flat. Upon his release from prison, Doherty immediately reunited with Barât and the rest of the band to play a gig in the Tap 'n' Tin nightclub in Chatham, Kent; known among Libertine fans as "The Freedom Gig".

Following his rejoining of the band, Doherty sought treatment for his drug addiction. However, he walked out of the rehabilitation centre at the Thamkrabok Monastery in Thailand after only three days, initially heading for Bangkok before returning to the United Kingdom. As a consequence of this, the Libertines cancelled appearances that they were due to make at the Isle of Wight and Glastonbury festivals.

While post-production work was taking place on the Libertines' second studio album in June 2004, Doherty was again asked to leave the band. The band cited Doherty's continuing drug addiction as the reason for his dismissal, but emphasized their willingness to take him back once he had addressed his addiction. Although Barât had previously stated that the Libertines were merely on hiatus pending Doherty's recovery the group effectively disbanded with Doherty's departure at the end of 2004. The remaining members became involved in other projects (see Yeti and Dirty Pretty Things). On 12 April 2007, Doherty and Barât played 13 songs together at the second of Doherty's "An Evening with Pete Doherty" gigs at the Hackney Empire, London.

In August 2010, the four members of the Libertines reunited to play a series of shows, including slots at the 2010 Reading and Leeds Festivals. The reunion shows received a highly positive response from the press and fans. In April 2014, the Libertines announced that they would again re-form for a show at Hyde Park in London. In November 2014 the band signed a recording contract with Virgin EMI Records, and released their third studio album, Anthems for Doomed Youth on 11 September 2015.

The Libertines toured Europe and the UK in November and December 2019.

=== Collaborations ===
Prior to the disbanding of the Libertines, Doherty collaborated with local poet Wolfman. Together they recorded the single "For Lovers", which entered the top 10, charting at number 7, in April 2004. Despite the success of the single, which was nominated for a prestigious Ivor Novello Award for songwriting, Doherty and Wolfman received relatively little money, having already sold the publishing rights for a small sum in a pub.

Later in 2004, Doherty provided guest vocals to the song "Down to the Underground" by the English electronic music group Client. The song was released in June 2004 as a B-side to the group's single "In It for the Money" and appears on their second studio album City.

In 2005, Doherty collaborated with the English alternative rock band Littl'ans on the single "Their Way".

In 2006, Doherty was featured on the charity single "Janie Jones", which was released to raise funds for Strummerville. A number of artists and bands, such as Dirty Pretty Things, We Are Scientists, the Kooks and the Holloways, also featured on the track.

In August 2006, it was announced that Doherty was recording with the Streets frontman Mike Skinner on a new version of "Prangin' Out", from Skinner's studio album The Hardest Way to Make an Easy Living.

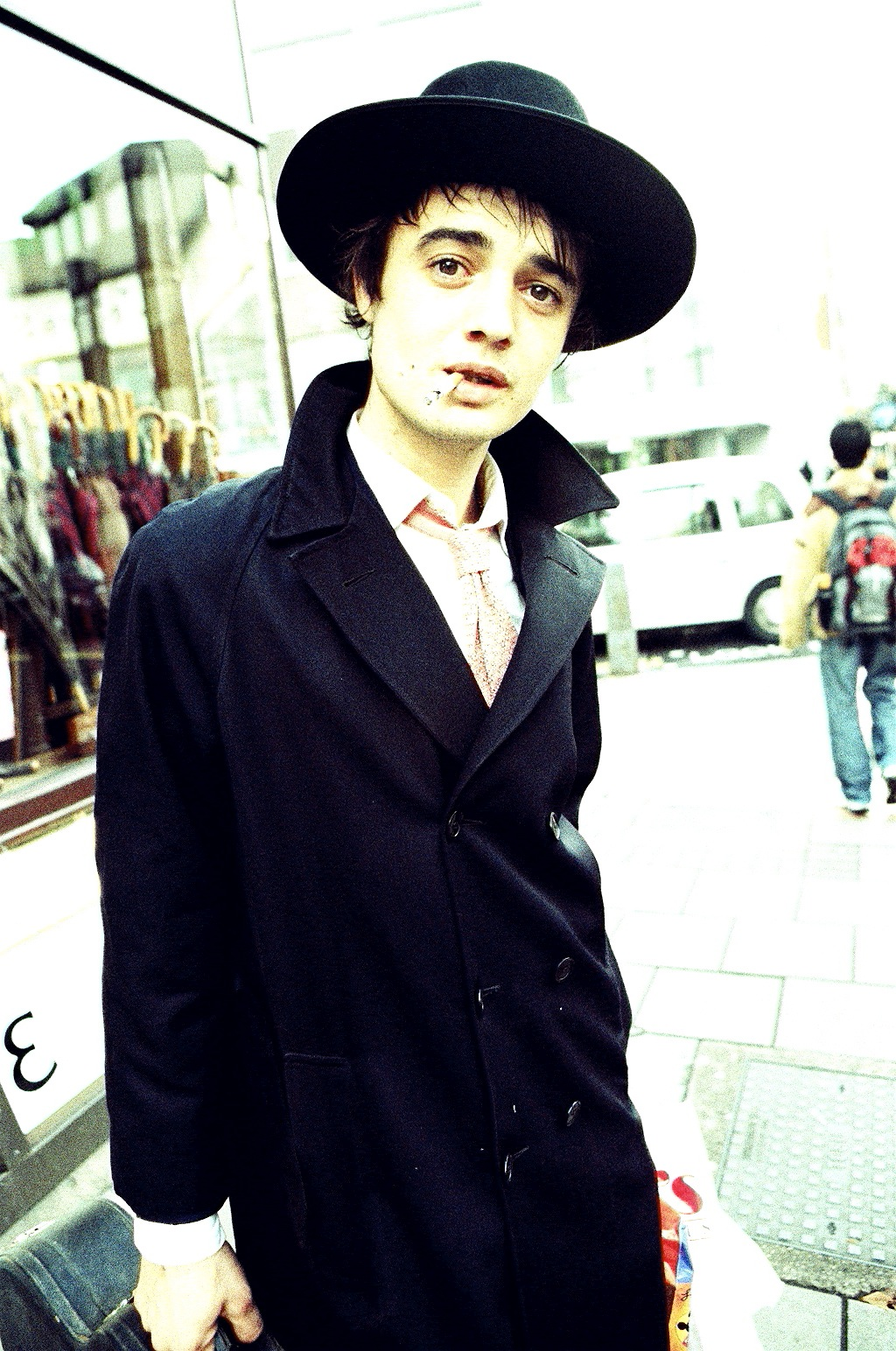
Doherty in 2005

In 2015, he recorded the theme tune to the Sky One sitcom After Hours.

In May 2020, during COVID-19 lockdown, he provided vocals for the single "Uncle Brian's Abattoir" released as Trampolene featuring Peter Doherty.

=== Babyshambles ===
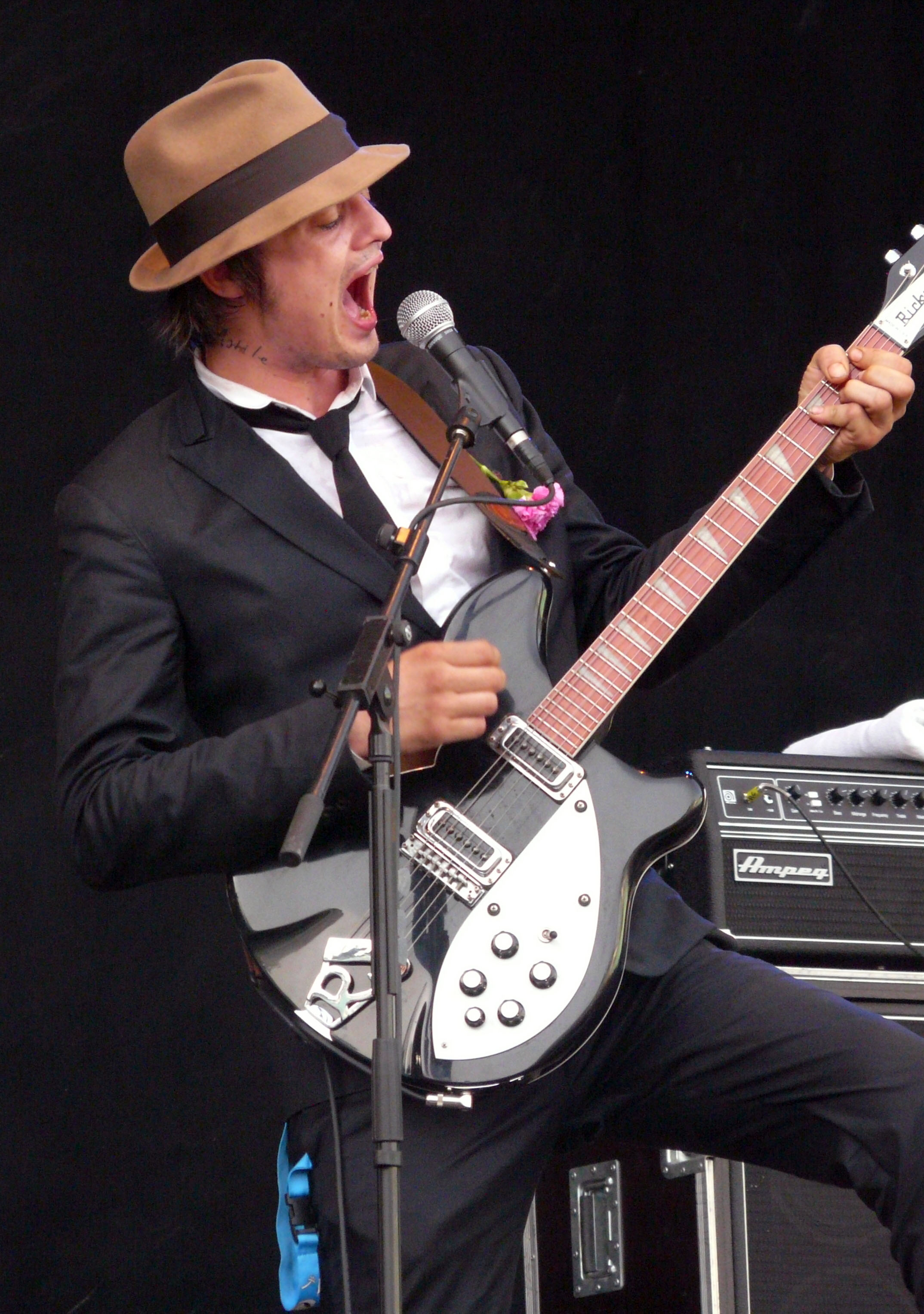
Saturday Night Fiber festival, Madrid 2008

Doherty founded Babyshambles towards the end of his time with the Libertines. The group has released three studio albums: Down in Albion, in November 2005, Shotter's Nation, in October 2007, and Sequel to the Prequel, in September 2013. The band's touring schedule and releases have occasionally been disrupted by Doherty's ongoing legal problems. The line-up of the band has changed several times: drummer Gemma Clarke left the band due to Doherty's drug problems and was replaced by Adam Ficek, and guitarist and co-songwriter Patrick Walden has also left the band and was replaced by Mick Whitnall. In August 2006, Babyshambles signed up with major record label Parlophone, on which they released The Blinding E.P. on 9 December 2006. In January 2007, they signed a long-term recording contract with Parlophone.

In November 2007, Babyshambles played their first arena tour, taking in dates at Manchester Arena, the Nottingham Arena, Bournemouth International Centre, London's Wembley Arena and Birmingham's National Indoor Arena.

=== Solo work and guerrilla gigs ===
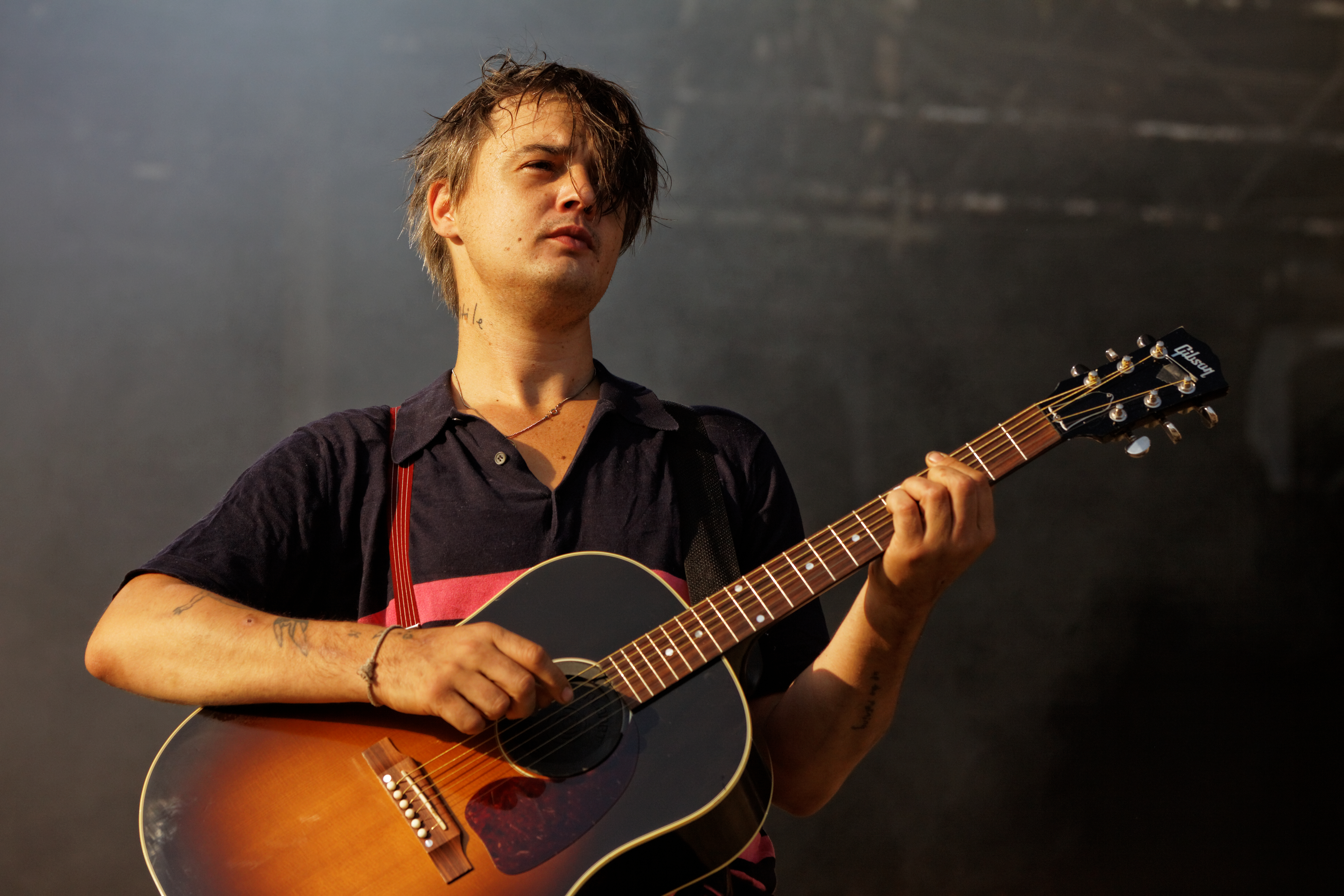
Doherty performing solo in 2012

In 2004, Doherty was voted the joint No. 1 on NME's 2004 Cool List. The following year he was placed at No. 6, and on 10 May 2006 was voted No. 2 in their poll depicting 50 of rock's greatest heroes.

On his own, and often with his band, Doherty has continued the Libertines' tradition of performing on short notice guerrilla gigs in small venues. On New Year's Eve 2005, Doherty held a guerrilla gig in his North London flat where he showcased some of his solo works, many of which later leaked onto the internet. 31 March and 1 April 2006 Doherty was performing two surprising solo gigs, his first in mainland Europe, at the NonStop Kino pornographic cinema and venue in Graz, Austria, after he failed to turn up for an earlier arrangement in January. For this occasion he produced, at the suggestion of Bettina Aichbauer, friend of Doherty and owner of the NonStop Kino, a film with the title Spew It Out Your Soul, which he showed on-screen during his performance.

On 12 July 2008, Doherty played a solo gig at the Royal Albert Hall. It was his biggest solo show so far. The concert was originally scheduled for 26 April, but had to be rescheduled due to Doherty's being sentenced to 14 weeks in prison for breaching probation on 8 April. The solo show received mixed reviews. Jon Swaine of The Daily Telegraph criticised that "whole chunks of the set ... passed by as listless noodling, with neither Doherty nor the audience appearing to know quite how to behave" and that – without a full band – Doherty seemed out of place at such a big venue. Betty Clarke of The Guardian described Doherty as "focused" and "on good form". Friend and collaborator Peter Wolfe had a guest appearance on stage when Doherty performed "For Lovers". Swaine stated Wolfe ruined the song with "some especially tuneless backing vocals". The gig was forced to an abrupt end during the encore due to a stage invasion by the fans.

On 13 January 2009, NME announced that Doherty's debut solo studio album, entitled Grace/Wastelands, would be released on 16 March, preceded by a single, "The Last of the English Roses", on 9 March.

Whilst performing a solo gig at the Grimsby Auditorium in March 2009, Doherty declared Grimsby a "shit-hole" midway through his set after being continuously pelted with coins and drinks by a harsh crowd.

In March 2015, Doherty released a new single entitled "Flags of the Old Regime" through Walk Tall Recordings. All proceeds of single went to the Amy Winehouse Foundation.

In May 2016, Doherty was joined on his 'Eudaimonia' tour by Drew McConnell (bass guitar), Miki Beavis (violin), Katia de Vidas (keyboards), Stephany Kaberian (accordion) and Rafa (drums). He was also joined by Jack Jones of Trampolene on guitar, who was support on the tour. He shared new track "The Whole World Is Our Playground" on 4 May 2016.

In early December 2016, Doherty released his second solo studio album Hamburg Demonstrations, which had been recorded in the city over a six-month period, using mostly session musicians. It was produced by Johann Scheerer and received favourable reviews.

In 2021, Doherty teamed up with French musician Frédéric Lo to release "The Fantasy Life of Poetry & Crime", a single inspired by Maurice Leblanc, the creator of the fictional gentleman thief and detective Arsène Lupin. The single was recorded in Étretat and Paris, and has a video filmed by documentary maker Thierry Villeneuve.

=== Painting and writing ===
In June 2006, Doherty announced that he had signed a deal with Orion Books to publish his journals, in which he had recorded poetry, drawings and photos over the course of his career. Most of Doherty's journals are freely available on the internet. The book, titled The Books of Albion: The Collected Writings of Peter Doherty, was released on 21 June 2007.

On 15 May 2007, Doherty exhibited his paintings for the first time. The art exhibition took place at London's Bankrobber Gallery and was on show for one month. The collection featured 14 paintings.

An exhibition of Doherty's paintings titled, Art of the Albion, took place at the Galerie Chappe in Paris from 25 April to 25 May 2008. The exhibit caused controversy due to artworks made with Doherty's own blood. According to newspapers, anti-drug campaigners were enraged and accused Doherty of glamorising illegal substance abuse. Art experts were similarly unimpressed. David West, the owner of London's Decima Gallery, for example, slammed his work: "It's not got any artistic merit. He's using his blood to make them interesting, but when you look at them they're what any four-year-old can do."

Music journalist Simon Spence collaborated with Doherty for his biography A Likely Lad, published in 2022. Writer Antonella Gambotto-Burke called it "a strange and unreliable memoir by a strange and unreliable man."

The Janinebeangallery in Berlin curated an exhibition of Doherty's art, lyrics and artefacts entitled Contain Yourself (seriously), which opened in September 2022.

=== Modelling ===
Following in the footsteps of model and ex-fiancée Kate Moss, Doherty became the face of Roberto Cavalli's Fall 2007–2008 fashion advertising campaign. The photos gained praise for depicting a much cleaner and more handsome Doherty. The '50s-style photographs have been compared to images of Marlon Brando.

=== Acting ===
Doherty played Octave, the lead role opposite Charlotte Gainsbourg's Brigitte in Confession of a Child of the Century (2012), Sylvie Verheyde's film adaptation of Alfred de Musset's autobiographical novel La Confession d'un enfant du siècle (1836). Although the film was screened at the 2012 Cannes Film Festival it suffered an ignominious record as the lowest-grossing film of the year in US box office takings when finally released there three years later.

=== Peter Doherty and the Puta Madres ===
In November 2016, Jack Jones was announced as lead guitarist in Doherty's new band the Puta Madres, joining Drew McConnell (bass guitar), Miki Beavis (violin), Katia de Vidas (keyboards) and Rafa (drums), who had previously been his touring band. Peter Doherty and the Puta Madres played a gig in Argentina, followed by a week of shows in France including two nights for the reopening of the Bataclan.

Following European and South American tours and festival appearances, the band recorded their debut studio album in France during the summer of 2018. The band played a short tour of the UK in February 2019.

The self-titled studio album was released on 26 April 2019 and after instore signings the band set off on a UK and European tour.

=== Influences ===
In interviews, Doherty has listed his favourite books as George Orwell's Nineteen Eighty-Four (1949), Brighton Rock (1938) by Graham Greene, Our Lady of the Flowers (1943) by Jean Genet, Flowers of Evil (1857) by Charles Baudelaire and the complete works of Oscar Wilde. He has also mentioned Emily Dickinson and Tony Hancock as influences; Doherty and his father were once members of the Tony Hancock Appreciation Society. Doherty mentions Hancock, and makes an allusion to his catchphrase 'Stone me!', in the Libertines song "You're My Waterloo", which appeared on their 2015 album, Anthems for Doomed Youth. The band's debut album, Up The Bracket, is also named after another one of his catchphrases. Numerous literary and musical allusions occur throughout Doherty's Books of Albion, his personal diaries. He places particular importance on the Romantic poets and on existential philosophers such as Albert Camus and Miguel de Unamuno. Doherty has also alluded to work by the Marquis de Sade and Thomas De Quincey. On the Babyshambles debut studio album Down in Albion, there is a track entitled "À rebours", which is significantly influenced by the novel of the same name by Joris-Karl Huysmans.

Doherty has supported up-and-coming British bands, such as indie bands the Paddingtons and the View.

A frequent lyrical theme for Doherty is Albion, the ancient name for Great Britain. Doherty uses 'Albion' as the name of a ship sailing to a utopia called Arcadia, a vision of England in which no one is tied to societal rules, and where everyone is free to do as they wish. Doherty and Barât shared a run-down flat in London, at 112a Teesdale Street, Bethnal Green, affectionately known as 'The Albion Rooms', and Doherty also named his diaries the Books of Albion.

== Musical equipment ==
Doherty prefers vintage equipment. Many of his vintage guitars and amplifiers have been destroyed in various domestic incidents.

=== Guitars ===
- Epiphone Coronet – Doherty often used the rare one pick-up model ('New York Coronet' made in 1957) in the early years of the Libertines, as well as in some later gigs. It is affectionately known as 'heavy horse', which was also Doherty's username in online band related forums. His father held the guitar 'hostage' during eight years of Doherty's chaos and carnage, but allowed it to be used in Puta Madres studio album recording sessions.
- Gibson ES-330 – One of Doherty's first known guitars. Used throughout the early Libertines gigs.
- Epiphone Casino – Used with Babyshambles at recent concerts.
- Rickenbacker 360 – Used a lot in Babyshambles, live and in the studio.
- Gibson ES-335 – Used during the later years of the Libertines.
- Epiphone Olympic – Another rare one pick-up Epiphone. Seen on the cover of the "I Get Along" single (The Libertines).
- Gibson ES-345 walnut finish - Used during the Babyshambles period, live 2004-2005. It is now owned by Slovak musician Marián Lucký.

=== Amplifiers ===
- Vox AC30
- WEM ER-30
- Unspecified Matchless models
- Marshall 1974X and JTM45

== Personal life ==
Doherty has received extensive media attention for his turbulent personal life and drug problems. He currently lives in Normandy.

=== Relationships and children ===
Doherty had a tumultuous relationship with Kate Moss that was frequently covered by the press. They met in January 2005 at Moss' 31st birthday party and had an on-off relationship for several years. Moss had also taken to singing at some of Doherty's shows. On 11 April 2007, Doherty announced Moss as his fiancée during the first of his solo gigs at the Hackney Empire, London, at which Moss also performed. Doherty planned to marry Moss during the summer 2007. Moss and Doherty later broke up.

In October 2007, Doherty was briefly engaged to Romanian-born Canadian model Irina Lăzăreanu.

On 28 September 2021, Doherty announced his engagement with his Puta Madres bandmate, Katia de Vidas. The couple married two days later.

Doherty has a son, Astile, born 12 July 2003 with singer Lisa Moorish. Doherty's second child, a daughter, was born in December 2011 to South African model Lindi Hingston. In May 2023, Doherty's third child and second daughter was born to de Vidas.

Doherty is known for his close but turbulent friendship with his Libertines co-frontman, Carl Barât. Vulture has described their friendship as an "affectionately acrimonious brotherhood". In a 2010 Libertines concert review, Alice Fisher of The Guardian wrote, "When they were on stage, you never knew if Doherty and Barât were going to hit each other or kiss at the microphone they so often shared".

=== Interests ===
Doherty is a socialist. In 2004, he said: "I do have utopian fantasies. A lot of them are more – I wouldn't say spiritual, but they relate more to the imagination and the individual. But for me socialism is a way of trying to put far-fetched ideas into everyday use, trying to find a way to bridge the gap between that fantasy and reality, and reaching out across that gap to the people who can actually do something to make the change." Prior to the 2019 United Kingdom general election, Doherty endorsed Jeremy Corbyn while performing and chanted "oh Jeremy Corbyn" and "fuck the Tories".

Doherty is also known to be a devoted follower of Queens Park Rangers (QPR). As a youth (1995–96), he wrote a fanzine dedicated to the club, entitled All Quiet on the Western Avenue. He is also a supporter of French club Le Havre ; his 2025 album Felt Better Alive contains a song dedicated to the club's stadium Stade Océane.

=== Drug use and legal problems ===
Doherty has been repeatedly arrested for drug offences and offences arising from drug use, such as drunk driving, car theft, and driving with a suspended licence. He has pleaded guilty to possession of crack cocaine, heroin, cannabis and ketamine. His addictions have resulted in imprisonment and trips to rehabilitation facilities. Drugs had been so important at some points in his life that, in his younger days, Doherty worked as a drug dealer to pay for his drug habit, as he admitted to author Peter Welsh in his biography. Doherty stated that he had been a rent boy, and that during that time, he robbed one of his male clients. In his 2022 autobiography, Doherty said that his claims of being a rent boy were made up as a way to shock interviewers.

In 2003, while Doherty's first band the Libertines were performing in Japan without him, he broke into Carl Barât's flat and stole various items, including an old guitar and a laptop computer. On 7 September, Doherty was sentenced by Judge Roger Davies to six months in prison; the sentence was eventually shortened to two months on appeal. Doherty was released from jail on 8 October 2003.

In 2004, Doherty sought treatment for his drug addiction. He attended the alternative detox centre Wat Tham Krabok, a temple in Thailand, famous for its rehabilitation programme for crack and heroin users. He left after three days and returned to England.

On 2 February 2005, Doherty was arrested after an altercation with documentary film maker Max Carlish, who was making the rockumentary Stalking Pete Doherty about the singer and sold photos of a heroin-smoking Doherty to the tabloids. Doherty and his friend Alan Wass were charged with robbery and blackmail. On 7 February, he was released on bail after his record company Rough Trade put up £150,000 in bonds. All charges against him were later dropped by the Crown Prosecution Service (CPS) due to a lack of evidence.

In October 2007, Doherty said in an interview with the BBC Radio 4 show Front Row that he had briefly reconciled with his father after three years when his father visited him in rehab, but were estranged again over drugs. Doherty's mother, Jacqueline, has published a book about Doherty and his drug problems entitled Pete Doherty: My Prodigal Son. In late 2007, a photo was published in several newspapers of Doherty allegedly forcing his pet cat to inhale from a crack pipe.

Doherty made another attempt to fight his drug addiction in September 2007, when he underwent drug rehabilitation for six weeks at Clouds House. He relapsed in November 2007 following his appearance at the 2007 MTV Europe Music Awards in Munich. On 8 April 2008, Doherty was jailed for 14 weeks for breaching a probation order after a string of brushes with the law for drugs and driving offences. On 18 April, he was moved to a private area of Wormwood Scrubs prison after learning that fellow inmates were planning to attack him. On 6 May, he was released after his sentence was cut in half and a further 18 days were remitted due to a government plan to reduce overcrowding. He also had another two days off for being in police custody (after serving just over four weeks of a 14-week sentence). He described prison life as "a lot of gangsters and Radio 4" and showed a certificate confirming he had passed a drugs test while inside.

In June 2009, Doherty was arrested in Gloucester and charged with driving dangerously while drunk and in possession of heroin. He was released on a £50,000 bail and after 'guilty' pleas were entered, was asked to return to court on 21 December for sentencing. He was spared jail but was ordered to pay £2,050 in fines, and was banned from driving for 18 months, despite the court hearing Doherty had 21 previous drug offences and six motoring offences. Following his release from court, he was escorted by officers to the nearest police station and re-arrested for possession of a controlled substance, later revealed to be heroin. While Doherty was in Gloucester court on 21 December, heroin fell out of his coat pocket. He was arrested for possession and was convicted for this offence at the same court on 27 January 2010. He was fined £750 and ordered to pay £85 court costs.

In November 2009, Doherty caused a scandal during a concert organized by Bayerischer Rundfunk. He sang the first four words of the first verse of Deutschlandlied – presumably under the influence of alcohol – and was booed by the audience. The concert and the live radio broadcast were interrupted a short time later. Doherty had tried to continue the concert, but was asked by an organizer to leave the stage. Later, a spokesperson of Doherty explained that Doherty was not aware of the historical background of the line and that he apologized. In his autobiography, Doherty claimed not to have known the first verse was controversial. According to The Guardian, Doherty had earlier "raised a fascist salute as a joke at a concert in Spain last year, and the Libertines were criticised for a 2004 song, Arbeit Macht Frei, a phrase that was emblazoned above the entrances to concentration camps including Auschwitz."

On 11 March 2010, Lowestoft magistrates fined Doherty £500 and banned him from driving for 12 months for allowing his Daimler car to be used uninsured by his manager. On 19 March 2010, he was arrested on suspicion of supplying controlled drugs. He was reported to be on bail until April 2010.

In June 2010, Doherty was refused entry into the United States after spending ten hours in detention in John F. Kennedy International Airport, despite having a visa.

On 18 October 2010, Doherty was summoned to court for cocaine possession. In March 2011, he pleaded guilty to possession, and was granted unconditional bail until sentencing on 20 May. On 20 May, Doherty was sentenced to six months in jail for possession of cocaine following an inquiry into the death of Robin Whitehead.

In October 2014, Doherty was admitted to the Hope Rehab Centre in Thailand. He announced plans to start a foundation with the centre to help struggling addicts. In January 2015, it was announced that Doherty had successfully completed his rehabilitation.

In August 2017, it was revealed that Doherty had been found with heroin in his car while travelling through Italy. He was also found to be driving with an invalid licence. Doherty received a fine.

In a 2019 interview, when asked whether he would like to be drug-free, Doherty responded: "Yes, a part of me would. Just so I can feel things. There are so many people in my life who deserve better. It really is a mental deficiency... I'd be a force to be reckoned with! I'd have money and self-respect and clean hands."

In November 2019, Doherty was fined €10,000 in Paris and given a three-month suspended prison sentence for cocaine possession and affray.

In a 2022 interview with NME, Doherty stated that he had "been clean since December 2019."

In 2023, Doherty opened up about the lingering health issues resulting from his lifestyle. He mentioned that doctors had urged him to change his lifestyle and that "death is lurking". He also mentioned that he was taking blockers to counter the effects of heroin in his body.

=== Death of Mark Blanco ===
In December 2006, actor and magician Mark Blanco died after falling from the first-floor balcony of a flat in Whitechapel belonging to Doherty's friend and literary agent Paul Roundhill, during a party at which Doherty was present. After an altercation, Roundhill set Blanco's hat alight, punched him and evicted him from the flat. Blanco returned to the flat and was shown on CCTV falling to his death less than a minute later. After initial police investigations concluded there were no suspicious circumstances surrounding Blanco's death, a coroner's inquest in October 2007 recorded an open verdict and requested that police reopen the investigation. Doherty's bodyguard at the time, Jonathan Jeannevol, revealed he had confessed to police that he pushed Blanco to his death after Doherty had asked Jeannevol to 'have a word' with him; Jeannevol later retracted his confession. Doherty, who was not called to give evidence at the inquest, was also seen on CCTV footage stepping over Blanco's body and jogging away from the scene before an ambulance arrived.

Within six months of Blanco's death, Doherty returned to the Whitechapel flat to make a video for his song, The Lost Art of Murder. At this time he told a music journalist that he believed Blanco must have jumped from the balcony as "an artistic statement". Blanco's mother Sheila has described Doherty's behaviour as 'shocking', and said that he has never apologised.

An eight-month BBC Newsnight investigation in 2012 concluded that CCTV evidence suggested Blanco had been dropped from the balcony rather than jumped or slipped. In 2014, Blanco's friend, the comedian Jerry Sadowitz, played a video appeal at the beginning of his UK tour dates from Blanco's mother for the Crown Prosecution Service to reopen the case. In 2023, Channel 4 released a documentary about Blanco's death titled Pete Doherty, Who Killed My Son?

== Discography ==
=== Solo studio albums ===
Title	Details	Peak chart positions									
Title	Details	UK	AUT	BEL	FRA	GER	IRL	NLD	NOR	SWE	SWI
Grace/Wastelands	Released: 16 March 2009; Label: Silvertone (#502); Format: CD, cassette, LP, MD	17	11	7	7	20	28	83	38	13	10
Hamburg Demonstrations	Released: 2 December 2016; Label: Clouds Hill (#24503); Format: CD, cassette, LP, digital	61	67	107	104	68	—	—	—	—	48
Peter Doherty & the Puta Madres	Released: 2019; Label: Strap Originals	25	48	90	—	36	—	—	—	—	37
The Fantasy Life of Poetry & Crime (with Frédéric Lo)	Released: 18 March 2022; Label: Strap Originals	52	66	93	14	16	—	—	—	—	20
Felt Better Alive	Released: 16 May 2025; Label: Strap Originals	7	34	105	112	16	—	—	—	—	91

=== Singles ===
==== As lead artist ====
- "The Last of the English Roses" (9 March 2009) UK No. 67
- "Broken Love Song" (3 August 2009)
- "Flags of the Old Regime" (9 March 2015)
- "I Don't Love Anyone (But You're Not Just Anyone)" (27 September 2016)

==== As featured artist ====
- "For Lovers" (Wolfman featuring Pete Doherty) (12 April 2004) UK No. 7
- "Their Way" (Littl'ans featuring Pete Doherty) (17 October 2005) UK No. 22
- "Prangin' Out" (The Streets featuring Pete Doherty) (25 September 2006) UK No. 25
- "Uncle Brian's Abattoir" (Trampolene featuring Peter Doherty) (22 May 2020)

=== Other appearances ===
- "Down to the Underground" (Client, featuring Pete Doherty). Taken from the studio album City (2004).
- "Tinkertoy" (Sarasara featuring Peter Doherty) produced by Liam Howe of Sneaker Pimps and released by One Little Indian.

== Filmography ==
- The Wrong Ferarri (2011)
- Confession of a Child of the Century (2012)
- Amy (2015)
- Peter Doherty: Stranger in My Own Skin (2023)

== Bibliography ==
- The Books of Albion: The Collected Writings of Peter Doherty. Orion Books. 2007. ISBN 978-0-7528-8591-9.
- Doherty, Peter (2014). Antonia, Nina (ed.). From Albion to Shangri-La: Journals and Tour Diaries 2008–2013. London: Thin Man Press. ISBN 978-0-9562473-9-1.
