= Babyshambles =

English rock band

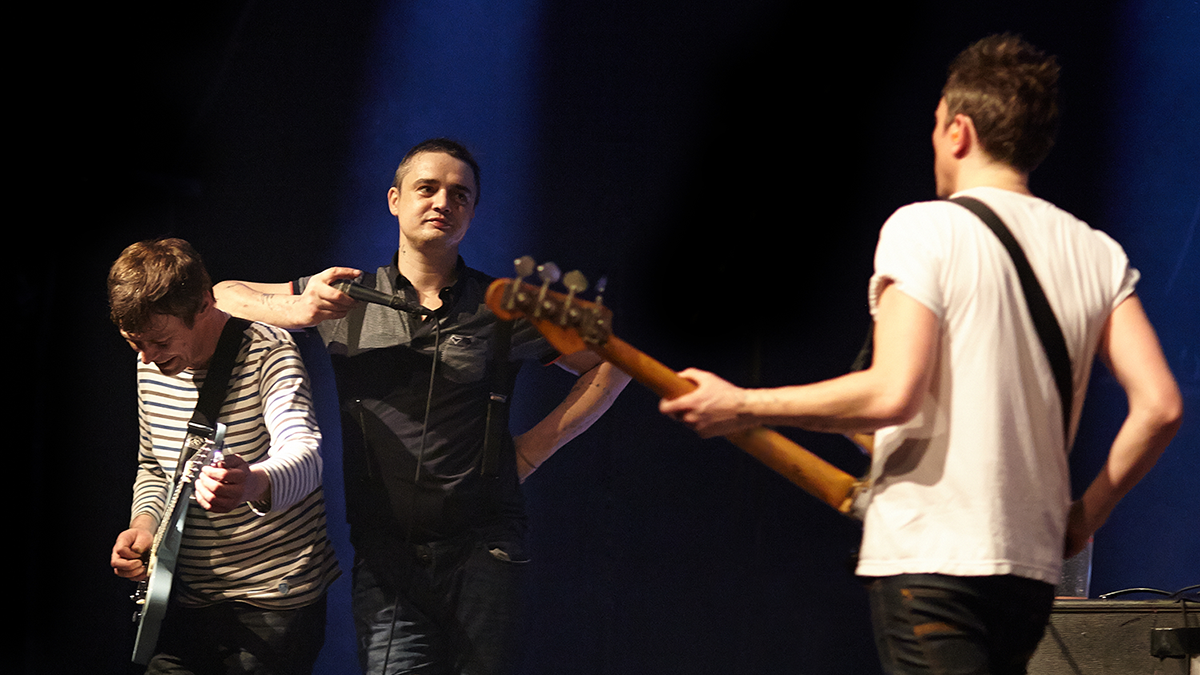
- Babyshambles live in Germany 2014

Background information
- Origin: London, England
- Genres: Indie rock; post-punk revival
- Years active: 2003–2014; 2025–present
- Labels: Rough Trade (2004–2006); Regal; Parlophone; EMI (2007–2010); Parlophone (2013); Strap Originals (2025–present)
- Spinoff of: The Libertines; Roses Kings Castles
- Members: Pete Doherty; Mick Whitnall; Drew McConnell; Adam Ficek
- Past members: Gemma Clarke; Patrick Walden
- Website: Official website

Babyshambles are an English rock band established in London. The band was formed by Pete Doherty (lead vocals, rhythm guitar) during a hiatus from the Libertines. Other long-time members included Mick Whitnall (lead guitar), Drew McConnell (bass guitar, backing vocals), Patrick Walden (lead guitar) and Adam Ficek (drums, percussion). Babyshambles have released three albums — Down in Albion (2005), Shotter's Nation (2007) and Sequel to the Prequel (2013) — as well as three EPs and a number of singles.

== History ==
=== Early history and touring (2003–2005) ===
In mid-2003, Pete Doherty was banned from playing with the Libertines until he could overcome his substance abuse problems. As a response, Doherty formed an alternative band, and recruited former Libertine Steve Bedlow as vocalist. Initially, Doherty planned on calling his new band T'Libertines, because of the band's Yorkshire connection – the line-up of the band at the time consisted mainly of Yorkshiremen. On the night Babyshambles' first gig was scheduled to take place, Doherty was arrested for burgling Carl Barât's flat. After he was charged and released, his friend Dean Fragile organized a new gig at the Tap'n'Tin. The performance received mixed reviews.

Doherty was sentenced to six months' imprisonment for his crime. His sentence was later reduced on appeal to two months. When he was released from prison, Doherty rejoined The Libertines and sidelined the Babyshambles project. However, he found time to record the band's first single, "Babyshambles", which was released in April 2004 on High Society Records. The artwork was by Sophie Thunder. The single was limited to 2000 CDs and 1000 7" vinyl copies.

In the early summer of 2004, Doherty once again found himself cast out of The Libertines because of his drug use. As a result, Doherty brought Babyshambles to the fore with Patrick Walden on guitar, Gemma Clarke on drums and Peter Perrett's two sons, Jamie and Peter Junior, on guitar and bass respectively. Doherty organised several gigs and the band began to gain respect in their own right, even though Doherty missed a number of appearances. The band's lineup underwent several changes before stabilizing during the late summer of 2004 with Doherty on vocals, Patrick Walden on guitar, Gemma Clarke on drums and Drew McConnell on bass.

In September and October 2004, Babyshambles embarked on a British tour that culminated with two shows at the London Scala. Despite fears that Doherty's performance would not be consistent, the tour sold out and received critical acclaim. The band's second single, "Killamangiro", was released 29 November 2004 on Rough Trade Records, reaching number 8 on the UK singles chart. The band embarked on another tour in December 2004, among growing concerns regarding Doherty's drug dependence. During a gig in Blackpool, the band walked off the stage when it became clear that Doherty was too intoxicated to perform, and a riot broke out at the London Astoria after Doherty failed to appear, with 150–200 of the audience invading the stage and damaging the band's equipment, including the destruction of Gemma Clarke's drumkit, an incident that cast doubt over her desire to continue in the band.

After finally stabilizing in late summer, Babyshambles' lineup underwent another change in January 2005. On 27 January 2005, drummer Gemma Clarke quit the band after disagreeing with their management. The ongoing heavy drug abuse of the band members, especially of frontman Doherty, and James Mullord's inability to do something about it, made her eventually leave the band. She was immediately replaced by Adam Ficek, who was once a band member of the White Sport alongside Patrick Walden.

=== Down in Albion (2005–2007) ===
In April and May 2005, Babyshambles spent several weeks in a recording studio in Wales working on their debut album with Mick Jones of the Clash, who had also worked with Doherty on the production of the Libertines' albums. The album, entitled Down in Albion, was released on 14 November 2005. It reached the Top 10 on the UK Albums Chart. The first single from the album, "Fuck Forever", had been released on 15 August, reaching number four on the UK Singles Chart. The second single, "Albion", was released on 28 November and reached number eight in the UK singles chart.

Fellow English rock group Oasis had booked Babyshambles to support them on their UK tour in July 2005. However, Doherty was attending the birthday celebration of fashion designer Hedi Slimane with Kate Moss and was unable to arrange transport back to the UK in time for the band's first appearance. As a consequence Oasis cancelled Babyshambles' support for the rest of the tour.

In September & October of 2005, Babyshambles toured the UK on the 19-date Pipe Down tour supported by The Paddingtons, The Cazals, General Khaki, Littl'ans and Alan Wass. Several more small gigs took place toward the end of 2005.

Babyshambles announced four small club shows in London, Liverpool, Sheffield and Stoke in January 2006. To the surprise of his fans, the band performed without guitarist Patrick Walden, with Doherty on guitar instead. Walden returned for a gig in Cambridge on 23 January and a UK tour in February. He played his last gig with the band at the Shepherd's Bush Empire during that tour, and has not appeared with Babyshambles since. He has, however, appeared on stage independently and in the company of Drew McConnell and Seb Rochford, playing two Babyshambles songs which he co-wrote with Pete Doherty, in July 2007.

In February 2006, Babyshambles won the Naomi Award for Worst Live Act, and were nominated for several NME awards. The band performed "Albion" at the NME Awards show, and Doherty won the "Sexiest Man" award.

In August 2006, Babyshambles signed to major record label Parlophone for the release of an EP, and headlined the Get Loaded in the Park festival. The band released the limited edition single "Beg, Steal or Borrow", which was exclusively available to those who had attended the festival. A free copy of "The Blinding" was released in the street magazine The Big Issue.

A cover version of the Clash song "Janie Jones" was released through B-Unique Records in October. The single was released to raise money for Joe Strummer's charity foundation Strummerville and features contributions from others bands such as Dirty Pretty Things, Larrikin Love, We Are Scientists, the Kooks, and Guillemots. This release marked the first time that Carl Barât and Pete Doherty had worked together since the Libertines parted, although they never met during the recording process.

On 4 December 2006, The Blinding EP was released to critical acclaim. The release was promoted with music videos for "The Blinding" and "Love You But You're Green", and an acoustic performance of the latter on The Culture Show. The single was not eligible for the singles chart because it contained too many tracks; however, the band claimed on its MySpace page that it would have made number four in the Christmas Day 2006 UK chart had it been eligible.

On 18 January 2007, it was announced that the band had signed a long-term record deal with Parlophone. The contract was reportedly for three albums. In Summer 2007, Babyshambles played Oxegen, Glastonbury Festival, the V Festival, T in the Park and Paredes de Coura Festival.

=== Shotter's Nation (2007–2010) ===
On 1 October 2007 Babyshambles released their second album, Shotter's Nation. The track listing for the album was revealed on 23 July 2007 in the (p)review posted on Allan Jones' Editor's Diary Uncut.co.uk blog. The Stephen Street–produced record contains 12 tracks and features a guest appearance from Bert Jansch on the acoustic closer. Adam Ficek commented that Shotter's Nation is a "glossy picture" of where the band are at the moment.

The first single from the album, "Delivery", was released on 17 September 2007, reaching number six in the UK Singles Chart after its first week on general sale. A week prior to the release, a 7-inch vinyl containing a demo version of the song and an interview with the band was released with NME magazine.

In November 2007 Babyshambles played their first arena tour, taking in dates at the Newcastle Metro Radio Arena, MEN Arena in Manchester, the Nottingham Arena, Bournemouth International Centre, London's Wembley Arena, Brighton's Brighton Centre, and Birmingham's National Indoor Arena.

The second single from Shotter's Nation, "You Talk", was released on 3 December 2007.

In January and February 2008, Babyshambles played their biggest European tour to date. Babyshambles were due to play at a lot of festivals that spring and summer, especially in France. In June they played at Hove Festival in Norway. In August they headlined the RadioOne/NME Stage of the Reading and Leeds Festivals. However, a large amount of their scheduled tour was cancelled due to Doherty's recent imprisonment. On 8 April, it was announced that Babyshambles was going to release a live CD/DVD entitled Oh! What A Lovely Tour on 2 June. The concert was recorded during the winter leg of the UK arena tour at the SECC Glasgow on 2 December. On 22 May 2008 Babyshambles performed at the Saturday Night Fiber, a new music festival in Madrid, Spain with other artists such as Morrissey. Growing speculation suggested that Babyshambles would be unable to make all tour dates for 2008, but in an interview with NME "Doherty added that he will honour all his booked live commitments with Babyshambles, but will not book further gigs until his solo album is finished". On 12 January 2009, along with Roger Daltrey, Babyshambles played a one-off gig at the O2 Academy Bristol in aid of Teenage Cancer Trust.

=== Sequel to the Prequel (2010–2014) ===
In June 2010 drummer Adam Ficek split with the band to focus on his solo outfit Roses Kings Castles, with former Supergrass drummer Danny Goffey temporarily taking his place. In early 2013, NME announced that Babyshambles were working on a third album, with Stereophonics drummer Jamie Morrison replacing Adam Ficek in the line-up. Stephen Street denied this speculation, but bassist Drew McConnell is said to have broken the news to the music magazine. On 29 April 2013, Babyshambles announced a UK tour for the months of September and October of the same year, kicking off on 4 September at Glasgow's Barrowlands. The new album, titled Sequel to the Prequel, was released on 2 September 2013, following Babyshambles' scheduled Australian shows in late July. The album charted at number 10 in the UK. Although Doherty's band the Libertines re-formed in 2014, Babyshambles continued to perform sporadic shows and festivals until 2014, most notably Rock am Ring, Rock Werchter, and Best Kept Secret Festival.

=== Return and Patrick Walden's death ===
After members of the band reunited on stage during a Doherty solo gig in August 2024, he claimed in a December interview that a reunion was "on the cards". Members reunited again during a Doherty solo performance in Watford on 21 March 2025, and two days later, at a Newcastle show, he announced: "Babyshambles, coming to a town near you this year".

Former lead guitarist Patrick Walden died on 20 June 2025, aged 46. The band confirmed his death in a statement shared on social media, which Doherty reposted to Instagram alongside a black-and-white photo of Walden. "We feel very fortunate to have known, loved and worked with him," the message read, asking for "respect and privacy during these difficult times". It was signed by Peter, Drew, Mike, and Adam.

On September 1, 2025, Babyshambles announced a 10 date tour of the UK during November and December that year, their first tour in 11 years. In May 2026, the band announced that it would play in a series of European festivals.

== Band members ==
Current members

- Pete Doherty – lead vocals, rhythm guitar, sitar (2003–2014, 2025–present)
- Drew McConnell – bass guitar, backing vocals (2004–2014, 2025–present)
- Adam Ficek – drums, percussion (2005–2010, 2014, 2025–present)
- Mick Whitnall – lead guitar (2006–2014, 2025–present)

Former members

- Gemma Clarke – drums, percussion (2004–2005)
- Patrick Walden – lead guitar (2004–2006; died 2025)

== Discography ==
Studio albums

- Down in Albion (2005)
- Shotter's Nation (2007)
- Sequel to the Prequel (2013)

== See also ==
- Babycham
