= Mick Whitnall =

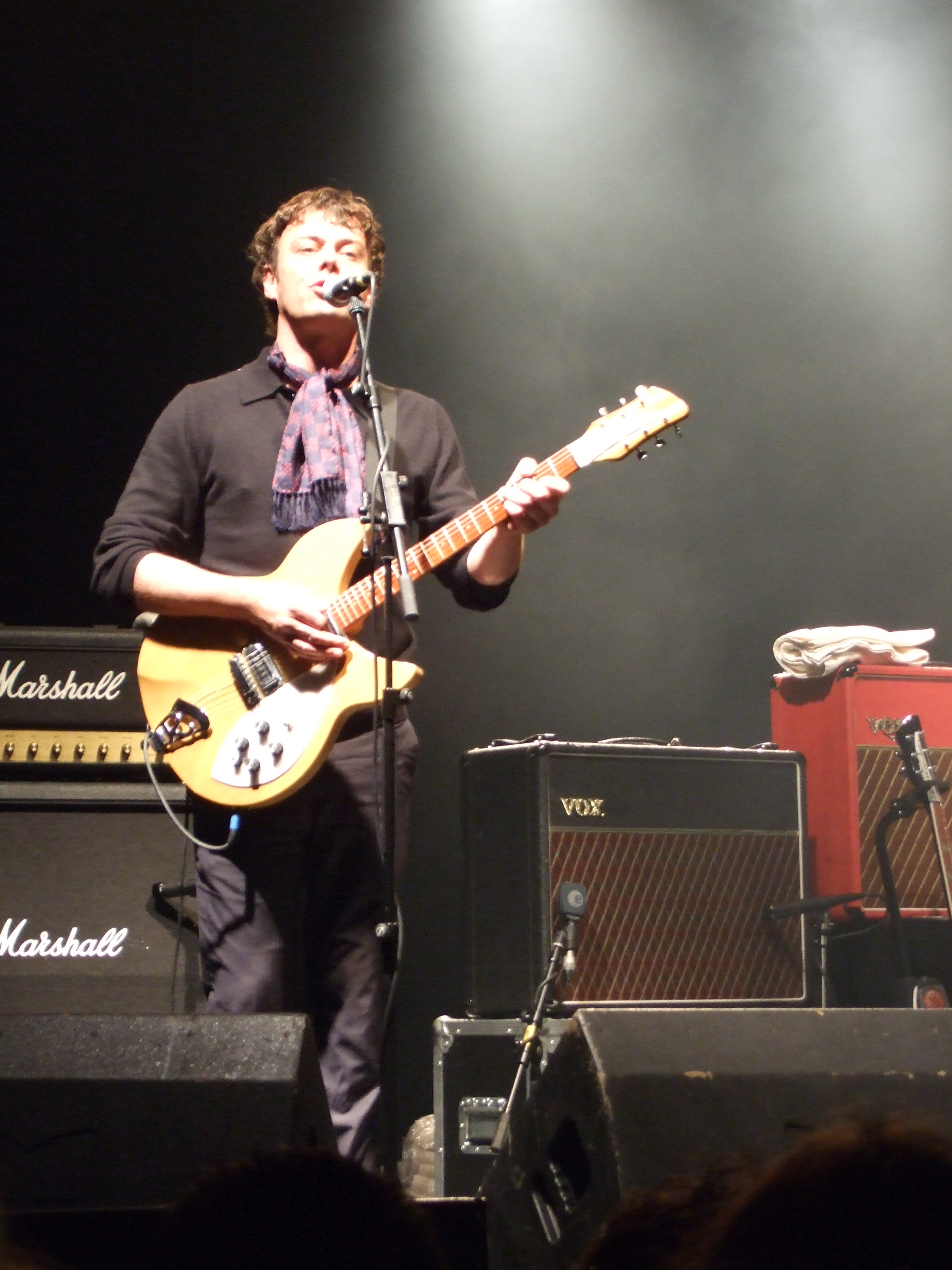
- Whitnall in 2008

Background information
- Born: 7 November 1968 (age 57); Doncaster, Yorkshire, England
- Occupation: Musician
- Instruments: Guitar; backing vocals
- Years active: 1988–present
- Member of: Babyshambles

Mick Whitnall (born 7 November 1968, Doncaster, Yorkshire) is the English lead guitarist for Pete Doherty's rock band Babyshambles, replacing former guitarist Patrick Walden. He lived in South Africa for a time when he was a young boy while his father was working there.

Before this, Whitnall played with Kill City fronted by Peter Doherty's ex-girlfriend Lisa Moorish, and also in bands including Finley Quaye's band and ska band 100 Men. Whitnall's first band was the Doncaster-based Skin-Deep, who recorded one album More Than Skin-Deep, which was released in July 1988.
