= Drew McConnell =

Irish musician

- McConnell (right) in 2008, hugging Danny Goffey of Supergrass

Background information
- Born: 10 November 1978 (age 47); Dublin, Ireland
- Occupation: Musician
- Instruments: Bass; guitar; vocals; piano

Drew McConnell (born 10 November 1978 in Dublin, Ireland) is the bass guitarist and backing vocalist with Babyshambles, and for Liam Gallagher's backing band. He lived in Tenerife, Spain, for much of his childhood and he speaks Spanish fluently. Formerly in the band Elviss, McConnell participates in a number of side-projects, such as the Phoenix Drive and playing double bass and piano with Irish singer/songwriter Fionn Regan as well as writing and recording solo material.

McConnell organises a musical collective named Helsinki, with which he performs solo material as well as versions of songs by Babyshambles, such as a swing version of their single "Delivery". Among the members of this collective are Stephen Large of Squeeze and Albert Hammond Jr of The Strokes., the drummer Seb Rochford of Polar Bear and Acoustic Ladyland, drummer Jamie Morrison (of the Noisettes), guitarist Matt Parks, Jonnie Fielding (violin), Larrikin Love and Fionn Regan.

McConnell completed a bass degree at the Institute of Contemporary Music Performance.

He also appears in the video "Police on My Back" by UK grime artist Lethal Bizzle, playing bass.

McConnell is heavily involved with the Love Music Hate Racism movement, contributing a song with Babyshambles and Helsinki to a CD given away free with a copy of the NME in 2007, as well as playing at such events as the Love Music Hate Racism carnival with Jon McClure of Reverend and the Makers.

McConnell also fronted the musical collective Mongrel with Jon McClure and members of Arctic Monkeys.

In 2011, McConnell was in a near-death crash where he was hit by a motorist who was accused of breaking a red light, and knocking McConnell off the bike and crushing his spine. He has since recovered, and said of the incident, "Humans are designed to deal with trauma of a physical and emotional kind. It's the stuff of life."

On 5 May 2014 McConnell's Helsinki released its debut album Coast of Silence. Its 12 tracks included "New Pair" and "The Very Last Boy Alive" which have also been recorded by Babyshambles.

In 2015, he released another album called A Guide for the Perplexed, including the track "Choices" featuring Pete Doherty.

In 2017, McConnell played bass guitar in Liam Gallagher's tour band, in support of Gallagher's solo album, As You Were.

In 2023, he released a new single called "Homo Nymph" on a split 7-inch vinyl with Italian band Lowinsky.
