= Adam Ficek =

English musician (born 1974)

- Born: 8 March 1974 (age 52); Bletchley, Milton Keynes, England
- Genre: Indie
- Occupation: Musician
- Instruments: Drums; guitar; keyboards; vocals
- Labels: EMI; Rough Trade

Adam Steven Ficek (born 8 March 1974) is an English musician and DJ who plays drums in the band Babyshambles and performs as a solo artist under the Roses Kings Castles moniker.

Ficek joined Babyshambles in 2005 with former The White Sport bandmate Patrick Walden. Prior to 2005, Ficek had recorded with the Mains Ignition, The White Sport and Cosmetique, alongside two jazz albums with Greg Foat

== Roses Kings Castles ==
Adam Ficek's side project, Roses Kings Castles (RKC), began while on tour with Babyshambles.

It was initially set up as a formal creative feed for Babyshambles and as a platform on which to build and air his own musical ideas. "It's an outlet for putting stuff out, just demos that I've been working on", states Ficek.

After releasing songs on the internet via his Myspace, Ficek released his first single "Sparkling Bootz" in April 2008. His debut album Roses Kings Castles, was released on 22 September 2008.

Ficek charts the highs and the lows of self-releasing his album through the medium of his blog, where he gives an insight into the music industry.

The first RKC tour took place in January 2009 in 19 venues across the United Kingdom with a European tour soon after.

January 2009 saw the release of a limited edition cassette featuring new demos which were later rerecorded for Suburban Timebomb.

In August 2009, Roses Kings Castles released the EP Apples and Engines.

The second full length Roses Kings Castles album Suburban Time Bomb was released in December 2010. The release was backed by a full band tour of the UK, Europe and South East Asia.

In 2011 Roses Kings Castles became RKC and released a free single "Here comes the summer". On 31 October RKC released the album "British Plastic." It contained 11 tracks (all written by Ficek). Ficek played all instruments except for guitar which was played by ex-White Sport and Ex Babyshambles member Patrick Walden.

== Discography ==
- Mains Ignition – Turn on (Tummy Touch) – 2002
- The White Sport – Songs the Postman can whistle (High Society) – 2004
- Babyshambles – Down in Albion (rough trade) 2005
- Babyshambles – The Blinding (EMI) – 2006
- Babyshambles – Shotters Nation (EMI) – 2007
- Peter Doherty – Grace Wasteland (EMI) – 2008
- The Greg Foat Group - Cityscapes (Jazzman Records) - 2011

=== RKC ===
- Roses Kings Castles – Roses Kings Castles (The Sycamore club) – 2008
- Roses Kings Castles – Ltd edition cassette EP – 2009
- Roses Kings Castles – Apples & Engines EP – 2009
- Roses Kings Castles – Suburban Time Bomb – 2010
- RKC – British Plastic – 2011

=== Adam Ficek ===
'EP 1' 2017
