= Two Door Cinema Club discography =

Discography of Northern Irish rock band Two Door Cinema Club

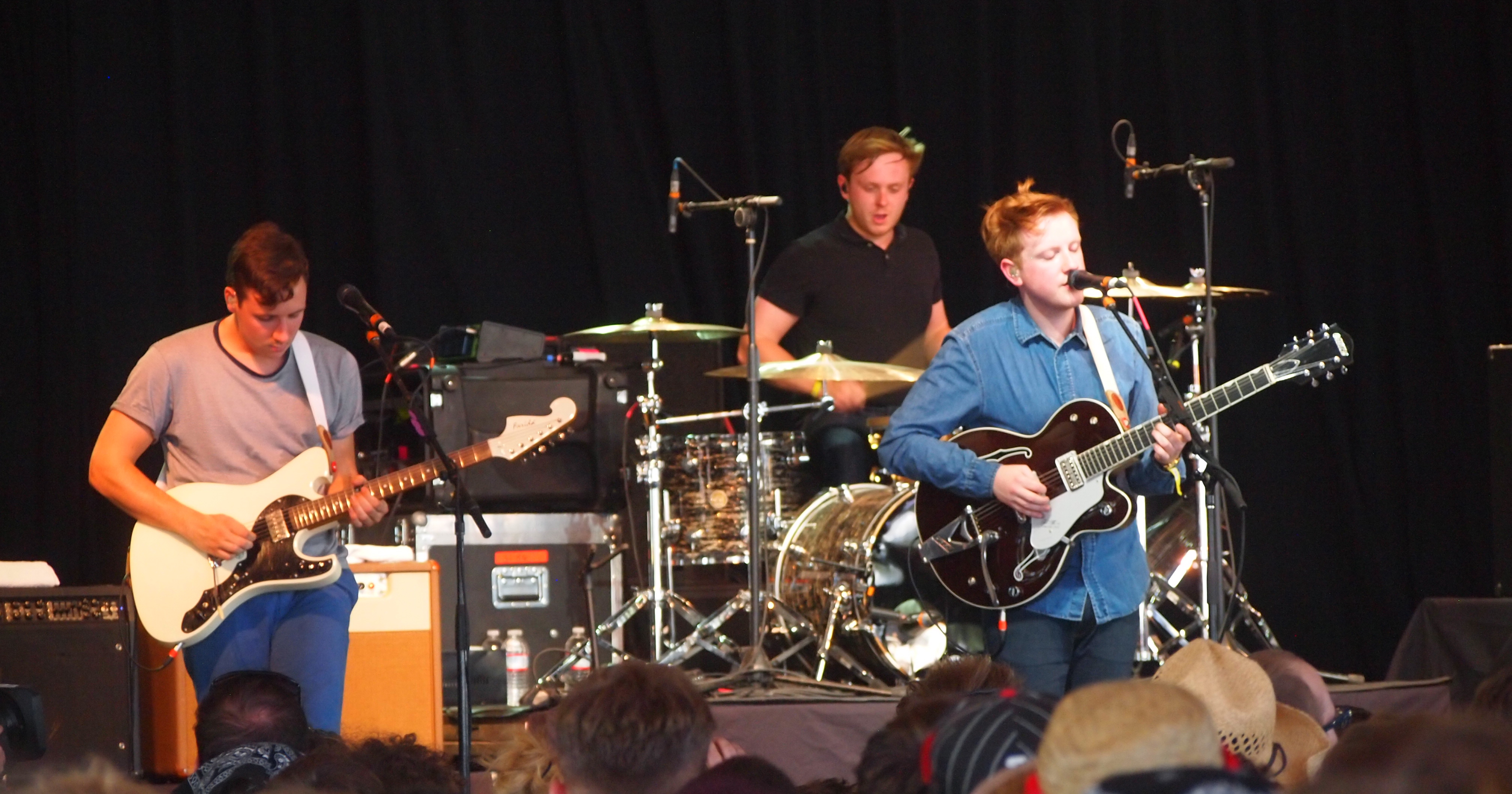
- Two Door Cinema Club performing at the 2012 Bonnaroo Music Festival
- Studio albums: 5
- EPs: 4
- Singles: 23
- Music videos: 18

The discography of the Northern Ireland indie rock band Two Door Cinema Club encompasses the releases of five studio albums, four extended plays, 23 singles and 18 music videos.

== Studio albums ==
List of studio albums, with selected chart positions and certifications
Title	Album details	Peak chart positions										Sales	Certifications
Title	Album details	UK	AUS	BEL (FL)	BEL (WA)	FRA	GER	IRE	NL	SWI	US	Sales	Certifications
Tourist History	Released: 17 February 2010; Label: Glassnote Records; Formats: CD, LP, digital download	24	44	— (Note: Tourist History did not enter the Flanders Ultratop Top 200 Albums, but charted at one on the Flanders Ultratop Heatseekers Albums chart.)	72	51	—	16	72	—	— (Note: Tourist History did not enter the US Billboard 200, but peaked at number 5 on the US Heatseekers Albums Chart.)	UK: 340,542	BPI: Platinum
Beacon	Released: 31 August 2012; Label: Glassnote Records; Formats: CD, LP, digital download	2	4	19	34	17	21	1	18	33	17	UK: 321,015; US: 110,000	BPI: Platinum
Gameshow	Released: 14 October 2016; Label: Glassnote Records; Formats: CD, LP, digital download	5	24	88	79	54	67	10	94	49	79		
False Alarm	Released: 21 June 2019; Label: Glassnote Records; Formats: CD, LP, digital download	5	62	117	147	128	73	28	— (Note: False Alarm did not enter the MegaCharts Album Top 100, but peaked at number 14 on the MegaCharts Vinyl 33.)	69	— (Note: False Alarm did not enter the US Billboard 200, but peaked at number 38 on the US Billboard Top Album Sales Chart.)	UK: 23,314	
Keep On Smiling	Released: 2 September 2022; Label: Glassnote Records; Formats: LP (Limited Edition), digital download	— (Note: Keep On Smiling did not enter the UK Albums Chart, but peaked at number 17 on the UK Album Downloads Chart.)	—	—	—	—	—	—	—	—	—		
"—" denotes a recording that did not chart or was not released in that territory.

== Extended plays ==
List of extended plays, with selected chart positions
Title	Extended play details	Peak chart positions	
Title	Extended play details	UK Phys.	JPN
Four Words to Stand On	Released: 26 March 2008; Label: Self-released; Formats: Streaming	—	—
Tourist History Remix EP	Released: 1 January 2011; Label: Glassnote Records; Formats: CD, digital download	10	—
Live in Sydney	Released: 19 January 2011; Label: Kitsuné Japon; Formats: CD, digital download	—	—
Changing of the Seasons	Released: 30 September 2013; Label: Parlophone; Formats: CD, digital download	—	194
Lost Songs (Found)	Released: 5 June 2020; Label: Parlophone; Formats: Digital download	—	—
"—" denotes a recording that did not chart or was not released in that territory.

== Singles ==
List of singles, with selected chart positions, showing year released and album name
Title	Year	Peak chart positions										Certifications	Album
Title	Year	UK	AUS	BEL (FL) Tip	BEL (WA) Tip	FRA	IRE	JPN	SCO	SWI Air	US Rock	Certifications	Album
"Something Good Can Work"	2009	56	—	23	25	—	18	—	49	—	—	BPI: Platinum; RMNZ: Gold	Tourist History
"I Can Talk"	2009	135	— (Note: "I Can Talk" did not enter the Australian ARIA Singles Chart but peaked at number 19 on the ARIA Hitseekers Chart.)	—	—	—	—	80	—	—	—	BPI: Silver	Tourist History
"Undercover Martyn"	2010	79	— (Note: "Undercover Martyn" did not enter the Australian ARIA Singles Chart but peaked at number seven on the ARIA Hitseekers Chart.)	—	—	—	49	—	82	—	—	BPI: 2× Platinum; RMNZ: Platinum	Tourist History
"Come Back Home"	2010	— (Note: "Come Back Home" did not enter the UK Singles Chart, but peaked at number 89 on the UK Physical Singles Chart Top 100.)	—	—	—	—	—	—	—	—	—		Tourist History
"What You Know"	2011	64	— (Note: "What You Know" did not enter the Australian ARIA Singles Chart but peaked at number 13 on the ARIA Hitseekers Chart.)	—	—	—	87	—	56	—	40	BPI: 4× Platinum; RIAA: Gold; RMNZ: 2× Platinum	Tourist History
"Sleep Alone"	2012	79	—	41	45	—	89	—	69	87	32	BPI: Silver	Beacon
"Sun"	2012	66	100	46	—	74	59	—	75	54	—	BPI: Silver	Beacon
"Next Year"	2013	188	—	—	—	—	—	—	—	—	—		Beacon
"Handshake"	2013	—	—	—	—	—	—	—	—	—	—		Beacon
"Changing of the Seasons"	2013	33	— (Note: "Changing of the Seasons" did not enter the Australian ARIA Singles Chart but peaked at number 16 on the ARIA Hitseekers Chart.)	59	—	—	42	55	29	88	45	BPI: Silver	Beacon
"Are We Ready? (Wreck)"	2016	166	—	—	— (Note: "Are We Ready? (Wreck)" did not enter the Wallonie Ultratop Top 50, but charted as an extra tip on the Wallonie Ultratop Bubbling Under chart.)	—	—	—	96	75	—	BPI: Silver	Gameshow
"Bad Decisions"	2016	— (Note: "Bad Decisions" did not enter the UK Singles Chart, but peaked at number 69 on the UK Singles Sales Chart.)	—	— (Note: "Bad Decisions" did not enter the Flanders Ultratop Top 50, but charted as an extra tip on the Flanders Ultratop Bubbling Under chart.)	— (Note: "Bad Decisions" did not enter the Wallonie Ultratop Top 50, but charted as an extra tip on the Wallonie Ultratop Bubbling Under chart.)	130	—	—	84	—	— (Note: "Bad Decisions" did not enter the Hot Rock & Alternative Songs chart, but peaked at number 39 on the Alternative Airplay chart.)	BPI: Silver	Gameshow
"Gameshow"	2016	—	—	—	—	—	—	—	—	—	—		Gameshow
"Ordinary"	2016	—	—	—	—	—	—	—	—	—	—		Gameshow
"Lavender"	2017	—	—	—	—	—	—	—	—	—	—		Gameshow
"Talk"	2019	—	—	— (Note: "Talk" did not enter the Flanders Ultratop Top 50, but charted as an extra tip on the Flanders Ultratop Bubbling Under chart.)	38	—	—	—	—	74	—		False Alarm
"Satellite"	2019	—	—	— (Note: "Satellite" did not enter the Wallonie Ultratop Top 50, but charted as an extra tip on the Wallonie Ultratop Bubbling Under chart.)	—	—	—	—	—	—	—		False Alarm
"Dirty Air"	2019	—	—	—	—	—	—	—	—	—	—		False Alarm
"Once"	2019	—	—	—	—	—	—	—	—	—	—		False Alarm
"Tiptoes"	2020	—	—	—	—	—	—	—	—	—	—		Lost Songs (Found)
"Wonderful Life"	2022	—	—	—	—	—	—	—	—	—	—		Keep On Smiling
"Lucky"	2022	—	—	—	—	—	—	—	—	89	—		Keep On Smiling
"Everybody's Cool"	2022	—	—	—	—	—	—	—	—	—	—		Keep On Smiling
"Millionaire"	2023	—	—	—	—	—	—	—	—	—	—		Keep On Smiling
"Sure Enough"	2023	—	—	—	—	—	—	—	—	—	—		Non-album single
"Happy Customers"	2024	—	—	—	—	—	—	—	—	—	—		Non-album single
"—" denotes a recording that did not chart or was not released in that territory.

== Other charted songs ==
List of other charted songs, with selected chart positions, showing year released and album name
Title	Year	Peak chart positions		Album
Title	Year	UK Indie Brk.	CHN	Album
"Cigarettes in the Theatre"	2010	19	—	Tourist History
"This Is the Life"	2010	20	—	Tourist History
"Think"	2019	—	26	False Alarm
"—" denotes a recording that did not chart or was not released in that territory.

== Music videos ==
List of music videos, showing year released and directors
Title	Year	Director(s)
"Something Good Can Work" (version 1)	2009	Unknown
"Something Good Can Work" (version 2)	2009	Ross Elliot Cooper and Bugsy Riverbank Steel
"I Can Talk"	2009	Megaforce
"Undercover Martyn" (version 1)	2010	James Lees
"Undercover Martyn" (version 2)	2010	Brian Philip Davis
"Come Back Home"	2010	Nicholas Bentley
"What You Know"	2011	Lope Serrano
"Sleep Alone"	2012	AB/BC/CD
"Sun"	2012	Jul & Mat
"Next Year"	2013	Giorgio Testi
"Handshake"	2013	Sam Pilling
"Changing of the Seasons"	2013	Brewer
"Are We Ready? (Wreck)"	2016	Thunderlips
"Bad Decisions"	2016	Thunderlips
"Talk"	2019	Max Siedentopf
"Satellite"	2019	Eoin Glaister
"Dirty Air"	2019	Jordan Martin
"Once"	2019	Mathy & Fran
"Wonderful Life"	2022	Unknown
"Lucky"	2022	Rudá Santos
"Everybody's Cool"	2022	Jack Pell
"Millionaire"	2023	Good Time Fun Time
"Sure Enough"	2023	Unthnkble
"This Is the Life"	2026	Unknown
