= Beacon (Two Door Cinema Club album) =

Studio album by Two Door Cinema Club
- Released: 31 August 2012
- Recorded: April–May 2012
- Studios: Jacknife Lee's home studio (Topanga, California); Red Light (London) (Note: Additional vocals)
- Genre: Indie pop
- Length: 39:38
- Label: Kitsuné
- Producer: Jacknife Lee

Two Door Cinema Club chronology
Tourist History (2010)	Beacon (2012)	Changing of the Seasons (2013)

Singles from Beacon
- 1. "Sleep Alone" Released: 20 July 2012; 2. "Sun" Released: 16 November 2012; 3. "Next Year" Released: 15 February 2013; 4. "Handshake" Released: 31 May 2013

Beacon is the second studio album by Northern Irish indie rock band Two Door Cinema Club, released by Kitsuné on 31 August 2012.

Beacon was predominantly recorded and produced at Jacknife Lee's home studio in Los Angeles, California.

The album cover artwork is a tribute to French photographer Guy Bourdin, whom the band credited as an artistic inspiration during the recording process.

== Promotion ==
Two Door Cinema Club teased a second album throughout 2010 and 2011, frequently playing the songs "Handshake", "Settle", "Sleep Alone", and "Wake Up" live before the album was announced. "Sleep Alone" was released as the lead single from Beacon on 20 July 2012. The album's second single, "Sun", was released on 16 November 2012. "Next Year" was released as the album's third single on 15 February 2013, peaking at number 188 on UK Singles Chart, and was followed by "Handshake" on 31 May 2013. The album was reissued on 28 October 2013 including the song "Changing of the Seasons", which was released as the lead single from the EP of the same name.

== What We See ==
From 24 August to 10 September 2012, the band released a four-part documentary titled What We See, which depicts their European summer tour prior to the release of Beacon. In relation to touring, lead singer Trimble explained, "The past few years have sort have been not necessarily a struggle, but a learning curve. So it's learning to be in touch with the people you leave behind and learning to just deal with the ridiculousness of it all." The documentary was filmed by Gregg Houston (Babysweet Sessions), a friend of the band.

== Critical reception ==
Professional ratings
Aggregate scores
Source	Rating
Metacritic	62/100
Review scores
Source	Rating
AllMusic	3/5 stars
Entertainment Weekly	B+
Evening Standard	4/5 stars
The Guardian	3/5 stars
The Irish Times	4/5 stars
musicOMH	2.5/5 stars
NME	8/10
The Observer	2/5 stars
Paste	8.3/10
Sputnikmusic	3.5/5

Beacon received generally positive reviews from music critics. At Metacritic, which assigns a normalised rating out of 100 to reviews from mainstream publications, the album received an average score of 62, based on 18 reviews. Katherine Rodgers of NME stated the album "blitzes in on a flurry of discordant, M83-style synth-fuzz, and while it doesn't stray far from their trademark tinkly guitar lines and infectious choruses, it's laced with New Order-ish disco trimmings." Ray Rahman of Entertainment Weekly commented the album "tempers its galloping pop gait with frontman Alex Trimble's Ben Gibbard-y confessionals. And at their best, tracks like 'Sleep Alone' and 'Wake Up' come off like a less grandstanding Killers—human and dancer." Megan Farokhmanesh of Paste wrote that "Beacon isn't a step up from Tourist History, but rather a brother to it", while stating that "[t]here's very little progression or change in their sound, but that doesn't necessarily have to be a bad thing." The Irish Times' Lauren Murphy opined that Beacon "may not be as instantly gratifying as Tourist History, but with producer Jacknife Lee's guidance the band have plumbed deeper songwriting depths and turned in some fantastic songs." In a review for the Evening Standard, Rick Pearson found that on Beacon, the band "share Snow Patrol's fondness for a big picture and even bigger sound but they are altogether lighter on their feet". Davey Boy of Sputnikmusic viewed Beacon as "a wise and predictably executed record in all the right ways", as well as "a more even, consistent and cohesive LP than Tourist History, even if it does not reach the same individual heights."

AllMusic editor Heather Phares felt that "much of the nervy, scrappy energy that made Tourist History so appealing is missing from Beacon", concluding, "There's nothing overtly bad about Beacon; it shows that Two Door Cinema Club still have a remarkable knack for winsome melodies and harmonies set to kinetic beats." The Guardian's Dave Simpson expressed, "'Next Year''s fleeting Beach Boys/Beatles harmonies aside, there aren't too many departures from what made them successful: radio-friendly songs with intricate little catchy bits which may find new homes as advertising jingles." Despite dubbing Beacon "another competent album of breezy indie-pop tunes" and praising Trimble's "songwriting gift", Martin Headon of musicOMH found it to be "a rather dissatisfying listen", concluding, "With only one true standout track, a handful of fillers, and little innovation or progress, it reeks of diminishing returns from start to finish." Aoife Ryan of State Magazine claimed that "[t]hough producer Jacknife Lee is sure to make the album profitable, it is still hit and miss with many of the same faults as the first one", further stating, "At its worst it is formulaic with saccharine lyrics but on occasion it does hint that they have something more to give." Paul Mardles of The Observer argued that "while [Beacon] is polished, thanks no doubt to U2 producer Jacknife Lee, there is nothing to distinguish Two Door Cinema Club from several other excitable indie-disco bands", adding that aside from "Sun", Beacon is "prosaic and frenetic, its tireless synths and fidgety guitars unable to camouflage the group's dearth of ideas."

== Commercial performance ==
Beacon debuted at number one on the Irish Albums Chart, becoming the band's first number-one album on the chart. In the United Kingdom, the album debuted at number two on the UK Albums Chart, selling 33,306 copies in its first week. On 15 October 2021, the album was certified platinum by the British Phonographic Industry (BPI), denoting shipments in excess of 300,000 copies in the UK.

In the United States, the album debuted at number 17 on the Billboard 200, and number seven on Top Rock Albums, selling 16,000 copies in its first week. It had sold 110,000 copies in the US as of September 2016.

== Track listing ==
All tracks are written by Alex Trimble, Kevin Baird and Sam Halliday.

No.	Title	Length
1.	"Next Year"	4:11
2.	"Handshake"	3:31
3.	"Wake Up"	3:45
4.	"Sun"	3:07
5.	"Someday"	3:43
6.	"Sleep Alone"	3:56
7.	"The World Is Watching" (with Valentina)	3:36
8.	"Settle"	3:52
9.	"Spring"	3:24
10.	"Pyramid"	3:09
11.	"Beacon"	3:24
Total length:		39:38

iTunes Store bonus track
No.	Title	Length
12.	"Remember My Name"	2:51

Fnac France special edition bonus tracks
No.	Title	Length
12.	"Sleep Alone" (Giraffage Remix)	3:37
13.	"Sleep Alone" (Poindexter Remix)	4:56

Japanese edition bonus tracks
No.	Title	Length
12.	"Start Again"	4:15
13.	"Sleep Alone" (acoustic)	4:05

2013 reissue bonus track
No.	Title	Length
12.	"Changing of the Seasons"	3:43

Deluxe edition bonus disc (live at Brixton Academy, 25 February 2012)
No.	Title	Length
1.	"Cigarettes in the Theatre"	5:06
2.	"Undercover Martyn"	3:05
3.	"Do You Want It All?"	3:49
4.	"This Is the Life"	3:20
5.	"Something Good Can Work"	3:11
6.	"Handshake"	4:05
7.	"Costume Party"	3:40
8.	"You're Not Stubborn"	3:26
9.	"Settle"	3:59
10.	"Eat That Up, It's Good for You"	4:12
11.	"What You Know"	4:37
12.	"Sleep Alone"	3:55
13.	"Come Back Home"	4:18
14.	"I Can Talk"	3:55

2013 Japanese deluxe edition bonus disc
No.	Title	Length
1.	"Sun" (live)
2.	"Sleep Alone" (live)
3.	"Next Year" (live)
4.	"Sun" (acoustic)
5.	"Next Year" (acoustic)
6.	"Next Year" (NTEIBINT Remix)
7.	"Sun" (Gildas KItsune Club Night Remix)
8.	"Sun" (Fred Falke Remix)
9.	"Sun" (Alex Metric Remix)
10.	"Sun" (Logo Remix)
11.	"Sleep Alone" (BeatauCue Remix)

== Personnel ==
Credits adapted from the liner notes of Beacon.

=== Two Door Cinema Club ===
- Alex Trimble – vocals, guitar, synths, piano, keyboards, drums, percussion, programming
- Kevin Baird – bass guitar, synthesizers, vocals
- Sam Halliday – guitar, synthesizers, vocals

=== Additional personnel ===
- Jacknife Lee – production, additional recording, programming
- Mike Crossey – mixing
- Sam Bell – recording
- Matt Bishop – additional recording, editing
- Robin Schmidt – mastering
- Eric Gorfain – orchestration (tracks 2, 4, 7–10)
- Valentina – vocals (track 7)
- Megaforce – artwork, photography
- Damien Ropero – photography
- Eva Provence – cover model
- Matthieu Botrel – set design
- Charlotte Balme – styling
- Felix Mondino – artwork production
- Pablo Amati – retouching
- Emiliano Serantoni – retouching

== Charts ==
=== Weekly charts ===
Weekly chart performance for Beacon
Chart (2012)	Peak position
Australian Albums (ARIA)	4
Austrian Albums (Ö3 Austria)	30
Belgian Albums (Ultratop Flanders)	19
Belgian Albums (Ultratop Wallonia)	36
Canadian Albums (Billboard)	21
Dutch Albums (Album Top 100)	18
French Albums (SNEP)	17
German Albums (Offizielle Top 100)	21
Irish Albums (IRMA)	1
Irish Independent Albums (IRMA)	1
Japanese Albums (Oricon)	30
New Zealand Albums (RMNZ)	36
Scottish Albums (Official Charts)	2
Spanish Albums (Promusicae)	20
Swiss Albums (Schweizer Hitparade)	33
UK Albums (Official Charts)	2
US Billboard 200	17
US Independent Albums (Billboard)	5
US Top Alternative Albums (Billboard)	6
US Top Rock Albums (Billboard)	7

=== Year-end charts ===
Year-end chart performance for Beacon
Chart (2012)	Position
UK Albums (OCC)	111

== Certifications ==
Certifications for Tourist History
Region	Certification	Certified units/sales
New Zealand (RMNZ)	Gold	7,500^{‡}
United Kingdom (BPI)	Platinum	300,000^{‡}
^{‡} Sales+streaming figures based on certification alone.

== Release history ==
Release history for Beacon
Region	Date	Edition	Label	Ref(s)
Australia	31 August 2012	Deluxe	Cooperative Music	
Germany	31 August 2012	Standard; deluxe	Cooperative Music	
Ireland	31 August 2012	Standard; deluxe	Kitsuné	
Japan	2 September 2012	Standard; deluxe	Kitsuné Japon; Traffic	
France	3 September 2012	Standard; deluxe; special (Fnac exclusive)	Kitsuné	
United Kingdom	3 September 2012	Standard; deluxe	Kitsuné	
Canada	4 September 2012	Standard; deluxe	Glassnote	
United States	4 September 2012	Standard; deluxe	Glassnote	
Japan	27 March 2013	Japan deluxe	Kitsuné Japon	
France	28 October 2013	Reissue	Kitsuné	
United Kingdom	28 October 2013	Reissue	Kitsuné	
