= Changing of the Seasons =

Changing of the Seasons may refer to:

- Changing of the Seasons (album), a 2008 album by Ane Brun
- Changing of the Seasons (EP), a 2013 EP by Two Door Cinema Club
  - "Changing of the Seasons" (song), a 2013 song by Two Door Cinema Club
