= Sun (Two Door Cinema Club song) =

Single by Two Door Cinema Club

from the album Beacon
- Released: 16 November 2012
- Recorded: 2012
- Genre: Indie pop; dance-punk
- Length: 3:07
- Label: Kitsuné
- Songwriter(s): Alex Trimble, Sam Halliday, Kevin Baird
- Producer(s): Jacknife Lee

Two Door Cinema Club singles chronology
"Sleep Alone" (2012)	"Sun" (2012)	"Next Year" (2013)

"Sun" is a song by Northern Irish indie rock band Two Door Cinema Club from their second studio album, Beacon (2012). The song was released on 16 November 2012 as the album's second single. The Gildas Kitsuné Club Night Short Remix of "Sun" appears on Kitsuné Maison Compilation 14: The 10th Anniversary Issue. The accompanying music video premiered on 11 October 2012.

== Track listing ==
- iTunes EP – Remixes
1. "Sun" – 3:07
2. "Sun" (Fred Falke Remix) – 6:34
3. "Sun" (Gildas Kitsuné Club Night Remix) – 4:07
4. "Sun" (Alex Metric Remix) – 5:17

== Personnel ==
Credits adapted from Beacon album liner notes.

Two Door Cinema Club

- Alex Trimble – vocals, drums, guitar, percussion, piano, programming, synthesiser
- Kevin Baird – bass, synthesiser, vocals
- Sam Halliday – guitar, synthesiser, vocals

Additional personnel

- Sam Bell – engineer
- Mike Crossey – mixing
- Eric Gorfain – orchestration
- Jacknife Lee – additional engineer, producer, programming
- Robin Schmidt – mastering

== Charts ==
Chart (2012)	Peak position
Australia (ARIA)	100
Belgium (Ultratip Bubbling Under Flanders)	46
France (SNEP)	74
Ireland (IRMA)	59
UK Singles (Official Charts Company)	66

== Certifications ==
Region	Certification	Certified units/sales
United Kingdom (BPI)	Silver	200,000^{‡}
^{‡} Sales+streaming figures based on certification alone.

== Release history ==
Region	Date	Label	Format
Belgium	16 November 2012	Kitsuné	Digital download
France	16 November 2012	Kitsuné	Digital download
Germany	16 November 2012	Kitsuné	Digital download
Ireland	16 November 2012	Kitsuné	Digital download
United Kingdom	16 November 2012	Kitsuné	Digital download
