= Keep On Smilin' =

Keep On Smilin' may refer to:

- "Keep On Smilin'" (Wet Willie song)
- "Keep On Smilin'" (John Paul Young song)
- Keep On Smiling, an album by Two Door Cinema Club
