= The Joe Strummer Foundation =

Non-profit development foundation

- Founded: December 2002
- Founder: Lucinda Mellor Tait
- Type: Registered charity
- Registration no.: 1104165
- Purpose: New music development
- Location: 21 Perth Road, St Leonards-on-Sea, East Sussex, UK
- Region served: Worldwide
- Key people: Tom Heber-Percy, Anna Campeau, Crispin Chetwynd, Lola Mellor, Lucinda Garland
- Website: joestrummerfoundation.org

The Joe Strummer Foundation is a non-profit organisation which promotes the development of new music. It was established in memory of punk rock singer and guitarist Joe Strummer shortly after his death in December 2002. Strummer's widow Lucinda was the principal founder along with their daughters, Jazz and Lola Mellor, and English artist Damien Hirst. The organisation was known as Strummerville until December 2014.

== Organisation ==
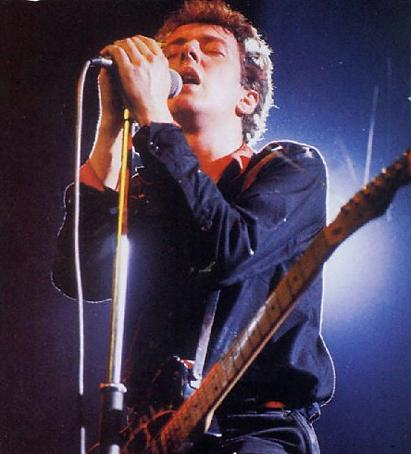
Joe Strummer

The Joe Strummer Foundation is a registered charity that supports aspiring musicians and funds projects which promote new music. The foundation's chief director, Trish Whelan, described it as an effort to cultivate interest and interactivity among young artists. "We are not a label, so there's no ulterior motive for us. It's not a training ground for pop stars, it's about helping people express themselves through music."

The foundation extends encouragement and material support to all unsigned musicians. The foundation operates the "Strummerville Studio", a free workshop and rehearsal space (decorated with handwritten lyrics by Strummer himself) at The Roundhouse in London. Other charitable facilities include two studios located in Belfast at the Oh Yeah music centre and one in Bogotá, built in partnership with the international non-profit Fairtunes.

In 2007, the foundation began operating one of the stages at the Glastonbury Festival, the annual performing arts event that had become one of Strummer's passions in his later life, dubbing it The Strummerville Bandstand. Also at Glastonbury is a small campsite named for Strummer that is the scene of intimate fireside performances.

The foundation has given support to hundreds of musicians including some, like Bastille and Anna Calvi, that have gone on to find wide audiences. The first national tour by Strummerville bands – the "Westway Round the UK Tour" – was begun in Autumn 2010 with the headline artist Beans on Toast.

The organization is itself often the beneficiary of charity events. In December 2019, a New York City concert marking the 40th anniversary of the release of London Calling donated all its proceeds to the Strummer Foundation. Participants included Debbie Harry, Jesse Malin, Fred Armisen, and Eugene Hutz.

== Related activities ==
A cover of The Clash's "Janie Jones", retitled as "Janie Jones (Strummerville)", was released by B-Unique Records in October 2006 as a charity single for Strummerville. The record was nominally credited to "Babyshambles and Friends" – in addition to the band Babyshambles, performers included Jamie T, Jeremy Warmsley, Kid Harpoon, Laura Marling, and Lisa Moorish, as well as members of Cazals, Dirty Pretty Things, GoodBooks, Guillemots, The Kooks, Larrikin Love, The Libertines, Macabees, Mystery Jets, Noisettes, The Paddingtons, The Rakes, and We Are Scientists. It reached No. 17 on the UK Single Chart.

Filmmaker Don Letts, an old friend of Strummer, made a documentary about the charity, Strummerville, released in March 2010. "Strummerville" is also the name of a tribute song to Strummer by Irish punk band Stiff Little Fingers.
