= Oh My Heart =

2011 single by R.E.M.

Single by R.E.M.

from the album Collapse into Now
- B-side: "Nola-4/26/10"
- Released: February 1, 2011
- Recorded: 2009–2010
- Genre: Alternative rock; folk rock
- Length: 3:21
- Label: Warner Bros.
- Songwriter(s): Michael Stipe; Peter Buck; Mike Mills; Scott McCaughey
- Producer(s): Jacknife Lee; R.E.M.

R.E.M. singles chronology
"Überlin" (2011)	"Oh My Heart" (2011)	"Discoverer" (2011)

"Oh My Heart" is a song by American alternative rock band R.E.M. It was released as the fourth single from the band's fifteenth studio album Collapse into Now on February 1, 2011. Its music video was directed by Jem Cohen.

As a tribute to the band, who were formed in Athens, Georgia, the University of Georgia features the song in several public service announcements which air during sporting events.

The song's lyrics, "Storm didn't kill me, the government changed," hint at Hurricane Katrina and the presidency of George W. Bush.

The song was featured in season 1, episode 3 of The Bear (TV series).

== Track listing ==
- CD single (Germany)
1. "Oh My Heart" – 3:20
2. "Nola-4/26/10" – 2:53
- 7-inch single
1. "Oh My Heart" – 3:20
2. "Harborcoat" (live in Riga, Latvia) – 3:44
- Digital download (Germany)
1. "Oh My Heart" – 3:20
2. "Nola-4/26/10" – 2:53
3. "That Someone Is You" (live in studio) – 1:45
4. "It Happened Today" – 3:45

== Charts ==
Chart (2011)	Peak position
Austria (Ö3 Austria Top 40)	47
Germany (GfK)	46
Switzerland (Schweizer Hitparade)	60
Czech Republic (Rádio – Top 100)	37
