= Sleep Alone =

Sleep Alone may refer to:

- "Sleep Alone" (Bat for Lashes song), 2009
- "Sleep Alone" (Two Door Cinema Club song), 2012
