= Sleep Alone (Two Door Cinema Club song) =

2012 single by Two Door Cinema Club

Single by Two Door Cinema Club

from the album Beacon
- B-side: "Start Again"
- Released: 20 July 2012
- Recorded: 2012
- Genre: Indie rock
- Length: 3:56
- Label: Kitsuné
- Songwriters: Alex Trimble; Sam Halliday; Travis Massenburg
- Producer: Jacknife Lee

Two Door Cinema Club singles chronology
"What You Know" (2011)	"Sleep Alone" (2012)	"Sun" (2012)

Music video
- "Sleep Alone" on YouTube

"Sleep Alone" is a song by Northern Irish band Two Door Cinema Club from their second studio album, Beacon (2012). It was released on 20 July 2012 as the album's lead single. The track is included in the official soundtrack for EA Sports game, FIFA 13. It was also featured in season four of The Vampire Diaries and in series two of The Dumping Ground.

== Track listings ==
Digital download
No.	Title	Length
1.	"Sleep Alone"	3:56

Digital EP
No.	Title	Length
1.	"Sleep Alone"	3:56
2.	"Start Again"	4:15
3.	"Sleep Alone" (Beni Remix)	5:28
4.	"Sleep Alone" (Math Bishop Remix)	5:19

== Credits and personnel ==
- Lead vocals – Two Door Cinema Club
- Lyrics – Alex Trimble, Kevin Baird, Sam Halliday

== Charts ==
Chart (2012)	Peak position
Belgium (Ultratip Bubbling Under Flanders)	41
Belgium (Ultratip Bubbling Under Wallonia)	45
Ireland (IRMA)	89
Mexico Ingles Airplay (Billboard)	34
Scotland Singles (Official Charts)	69
UK Singles (Official Charts)	79
US Alternative Airplay (Billboard)	19
US Hot Rock & Alternative Songs (Billboard)	32

== Certifications ==
Region	Certification	Certified units/sales
United Kingdom (BPI)	Silver	200,000^{‡}
^{‡} Sales+streaming figures based on certification alone.

== Release history ==
Region	Date	Format	Label
United Kingdom	20 July 2012	Digital download	Kitsuné
United Kingdom	2 September 2012	Digital EP	Kitsuné
