= Mine Smell Like Honey =

2011 song performed by R.E.M.

Single by R.E.M.

from the album Collapse into Now
- Released: January 25, 2011
- Recorded: 2009–10
- Genre: Alternative rock
- Length: 3:13
- Label: Warner Bros.
- Songwriters: Michael Stipe; Peter Buck; Mike Mills
- Producers: Jacknife Lee; R.E.M.

R.E.M. singles chronology
"It Happened Today" (2010)	"Mine Smell Like Honey" (2011)	"Überlin" (2011)

"Mine Smell Like Honey" is a song by American alternative rock band R.E.M. It was released as the second single from their fifteenth and final studio album Collapse into Now on January 18, 2011.

== Formats and track listings ==
- Digital download (United States)
1. "Mine Smell Like Honey" – 3:11

== Charts ==
Chart (2011)	Peak position
Mexico Ingles Airplay (Billboard)	36
US Adult Alternative Airplay (Billboard)	8
US Hot Rock & Alternative Songs (Billboard)	46
