= Überlin =

2011 single by R.E.M.

Single by R.E.M.

from the album Collapse into Now
- Released: January 25, 2011
- Recorded: 2009–10
- Genre: Alternative rock; folk rock
- Length: 4:15
- Label: Warner Bros.
- Songwriter(s): Michael Stipe; Peter Buck; Mike Mills
- Producer(s): Jacknife Lee; R.E.M.

R.E.M. singles chronology
"Mine Smell Like Honey" (2011)	"Überlin" (2011)	"Oh My Heart" (2011)

"Überlin" is a song by American alternative rock band R.E.M. that was released as the third single from their fifteenth and final studio album Collapse into Now on January 25, 2011. The title is a portmanteau of Über and Berlin.

The song's music video was directed by Sam Taylor-Wood and stars her then-fiancé, actor Aaron Johnson, dancing in an area of Shoreditch.

== Formats and track listings ==
- 7-inch single (United Kingdom and United States)
1. "Überlin" – 4:15
2. "What's the Frequency, Kenneth?" (live in Oslo, Norway) – 3:44
- Digital download (Germany)
1. "Überlin" – 4:15
2. "Everyday Is Yours to Win" (live in studio) – 3:38
- Digital download (United States)
1. "Überlin" – 4:15

== Charts ==
Chart (2011)	Peak position
Belgium (Ultratip Bubbling Under Flanders)	2
Belgium (Ultratip Bubbling Under Wallonia)	9
Israel International Airplay (Media Forest)	9
Mexico Ingles Airplay (Billboard)	32
South Korea International Singles (Gaon)	35
UK Airplay Chart (OCC)	33
US Adult Alternative Songs (Billboard)	26
