= Lisa Moorish =

British singer (born 1972)

- Also known as: Lisa M
- Born: 16 January 1972 (age 54); Walworth, London, England
- Origin: Brixton, South London, England
- Occupations: Singer, songwriter
- Years active: 1989–present
- Labels: Jive; Polydor; Go! Discs; Out Yer Box
- Formerly of: Kill City
- Children: 2

Lisa Moorish (born 16 January 1972) is an English singer and songwriter. She had a solo career beginning in 1989, and was the lead singer of the indie band Kill City in the early 2000s.

== Biography ==
=== Origins ===
Moorish was born in Walworth, but grew up in Brixton, South London. Her father Henry Watt is a black Jamaican "mixed with Irish, Scottish, Asian", whilst her mother Iris is English and from Middlesbrough. They met in a Hammersmith club.

=== Music career ===
Moorish began her musical career in 1989, aged 17, when she signed to Jive Records. She released two singles with Jive, although a huge club and dance chart hit, they were not commercial hits and she was dropped. In 1991 she released two singles with Polydor, but again commercial success eluded her. Signing to Go! Discs in the mid-1990s yielded an album (I've Gotta Have It All, 1996), as well as a collaboration with George Michael on a version of his Wham! hit "I'm Your Man".

In 1995, Moorish performed backing vocals on an acoustic version of the Oasis song "Fade Away" for the Warchild charity album.

In 1996, Moorish provided backing vocals on Northern Irish indie band Ash's hit single, "Oh Yeah", which reached number 6 on the UK Singles Chart.

In the early 2000s, Moorish was a member of indie band, Kill City. They were a four-piece consisting of Moorish, fellow songwriter "Welsh" Pete Jones on bass and guitarists Tom Bowen and Stuart Le Page. In 2004, they released their debut EP White Boys, Brown Girl on Alan McGee's Poptones label. Nash Gierak (Mower) joined the new line-up on bass in 2004–2006, alongside Tom Lindley and Pete Denton (the Kooks) on guitar.

In December 2003, Moorish recorded a cover of "Fairytale of New York" with Johnny Borrell on BBC Radio 6 Music. She has frequently performed with Drew McConnell. In 2006, Moorish appeared on the "Strummerville" charity single, a cover of the Clash's "Janie Jones" which peaked at number 17 on the UK Singles Chart.

== Personal life ==
In 1998, Moorish gave birth to a daughter, who was fathered by Liam Gallagher and conceived two months after Gallagher married Patsy Kensit. In 2003, she gave birth to a son to the Libertines front man, Pete Doherty.

Moorish and Gallagher's daughter gave birth to her first child, with footballer Nat Phillips, in September 2025.

== Discography ==
=== Albums ===
List of albums, with selected details
Title	Details
I've Gotta Have It All	Released: 1996; Label: Go! Discs; Formats: CD, CS, LP
Divine Chaos	Released: 5 July 2024; Label: Out Yer Box; Formats: digital download, streaming

=== Singles ===
List of singles, with selected chart positions, showing year released
Title	Year	Peak chart positions		
Title	Year	GER	NLD	UK
"Rock to the Beat"	1989	—	—	—
"Going Back to My Roots"	1989	—	—	—
"People"	1991	—	—	—
"Loves Heartbreak"	1991	—	—	—
"Just the Way It Is"	1994	—	—	42
"I'm Your Man"	1995	—	49	24
"Mr. Friday Night"	1996	62	—	24
"Love for Life"	1996	—	—	37
"Sylvia"	2024	—	—	—
"The Hunger"	2024	—	—	—
"Social Pariah"	2024	—	—	—
"—" denotes a recording that did not chart or was not released in that territory.
