= Changing of the Seasons (song) =

- Cover art, used for both the EP and the single

Single by Two Door Cinema Club

from the album Changing of the Seasons
- Released: 15 August 2013 (radio); 30 September 2013 (EP)
- Recorded: 2013
- Genre: Indie pop; synth-pop
- Length: 3:43
- Label: Parlophone
- Songwriter(s): Alex Trimble; Kevin Baird; Sam Halliday
- Producer(s): Madeon

Two Door Cinema Club singles chronology
"Handshake" (2013)	"Changing of the Seasons" (2013)	"Are We Ready? (Wreck)" (2016)

"Changing of the Seasons" is a song by Northern Irish indie rock band Two Door Cinema Club. The song is the lead single and title track from the band's 2013 extended play (EP) of the same name, Changing of the Seasons. "Changing of the Seasons" was the band's first new single since they departed their previous label, Kitsuné, and signed with Parlophone. It is their highest-charting song to date in the UK, Scotland, and Japan.

== Production and release ==
"Changing of the Seasons", the 2013 EP's title track, was first conceived during the writing sessions for the band's 2012 album, Beacon. According to Kevin Baird, Two Door Cinema Club's bassist, who spoke about the single's development to Rolling Stone, "We were making the record and we just had bits left over that we didn't really have time for. So it's sort of a continuation from that and we were just sort of on a roll writing music.

The band recruited Madeon, the French DJ and record producer, to produce the single. Madeon and the band had known each other prior to their collaboration on "Changing of the Season." Baird explained, "We brought in a friend, someone who brings a very unique sonic quality." Rolling Stone wrote that Madeon added a "dancey vibe to the tune."

The band's guitarist, Sam Halliday, stated that their work with Madeon on the single was likely a one time collaboration, due to Madeon's busy work schedule, "It was kind of a song that we wanted to explore and from that we're writing other songs...[But] at this point he's only in the one. He's too busy."

Two Door Cinema Club debuted their new "Changing of the Seasons" single on 15 August 2013, during an appearance on BBC Radio 1.

The three track EP of the same name was released on 30 September 2013, with "Changing of the Seasons" as its title track and lead single. The single was also included on the 2013 reissue of Two Door Cinema Club's second studio album, Beacon.

== Music video ==
The single's music video, directed by BREWER, debuted in the United Kingdom on 27 August 2013. The video, shot in black-and-white, features a cameo from British actor, Ewen MacIntosh.

== Performances ==
Two Door Cinema Club first performed "Changing of the Seasons" in concert on the main stage at the V Festival in Chelmsford, Essex, on 17 August 2013. The band's lead vocalist, Alex Trimble, explained their decision to give the single's debut performance at the V Festival, telling NME, "It was a really weird experience to play it at last, as we wrote it over a year ago", while noting that, "We’ve been practising it really hard and thought, ‘Where better to play it live for the first time?".

== Track listing ==
12" single

1. Changing of the Seasons"
2. Changing of the Seasons" (Monsieur Adi remix)
3. Changing of the Seasons" (Francesco Rossi remix)
4. Changing of the Seasons" (instrumental mix)

== Charts ==
Chart (2013)	Peak position
Australia (ARIA Hitseekers)	16
Belgium (Ultratip Bubbling Under Flanders)	59
Ireland (IRMA)	42
Japan (Japan Hot 100) (Billboard)	55
Scotland (OCC)	29
UK Singles (OCC)	33
US Hot Singles Sales (Billboard)	2
US Hot Rock & Alternative Songs (Billboard)	45

== Certifications ==
Region	Certification	Certified units/sales
United Kingdom (BPI)	Silver	200,000^{‡}
^{‡} Sales+streaming figures based on certification alone.
