= Undercover Martyn =

Single by Two Door Cinema Club

from the album Tourist History
- Released: 2 February 2010
- Recorded: 2009
- Genre: Indie rock; dance-punk; power pop
- Length: 2:47
- Label: Kitsuné Musique
- Songwriters: Alex Trimble; Kevin Baird; Sam Halliday
- Producer: Eliot James

Two Door Cinema Club singles chronology
"I Can Talk" (2009)	"Undercover Martyn" (2010)	"Something Good Can Work" (2010)

"Undercover Martyn" is the third single by the Northern Irish indie rock band Two Door Cinema Club. The single was released on 18 February 2010 by the French label Kitsuné Musique and Co-operative Music.

== Track listing ==
=== CD/Digital download ===
No.	Title	Remixed by	Length
1.	"Undercover Martyn"		2:47
2.	"Undercover Martyn"	Passion Pit	4:00
3.	"Undercover Martyn"	Jupiter	3:42
4.	"Undercover Martyn"	Softwar	6:37
5.	"Undercover Martyn"	Whatever/Whatever	8:28
6.	"Undercover Martyn"	Telonius	5:04
Total length:			29:51

=== 7" vinyl ===
Side A
No.	Title	Length
1.	"Undercover Martyn"	2:47

Side B
No.	Title	Length
1.	"Undercover Martyn (Passion Pit Remix)"	4:00
Total length:		6:47

== Charts ==
Weekly chart performance for "Undercover Martyn"
Chart (2010–2011)	Peak position
Australia (ARIA Hitseekers)	7
Ireland (IRMA)	49
Mexico Ingles Airplay (Billboard)	22
Scottish Singles Sales (Official Charts)	82
UK Singles (Official Charts)	79

== Certifications ==
Certifications and sales for "Undercover Martyn"
Region	Certification	Certified units/sales
New Zealand (RMNZ)	Platinum	30,000^{‡}
United Kingdom (BPI)	2× Platinum	1,200,000^{‡}
^{‡} Sales+streaming figures based on certification alone.
