= Are We Ready? (Wreck) =

Single by Two Door Cinema Club

from the album Gameshow
- Released: 14 June 2016
- Recorded: 2016
- Genre: Funk rock; dance-punk; indie pop
- Length: 3:50
- Label: Parlophone
- Songwriters: Alex Trimble; Kevin Baird; Sam Halliday; Garret Lee
- Producer: Jacknife Lee

Two Door Cinema Club singles chronology
"Changing of the Seasons" (2013)	"Are We Ready? (Wreck)" (2016)	"Bad Decisions" (2016)

Music video
- "Are We Ready? (Wreck)" on YouTube

"Are We Ready? (Wreck)" is a song by Northern Irish indie rock band Two Door Cinema Club from their third studio album, Gameshow (2016). The song was released on 14 June 2016 as the album's lead single. It was featured as a track in the soundtrack for FIFA 17 by EA Sports.

== Lyrics and composition ==
"Are We Ready? (Wreck)" is an indie pop song inspired by Prince and David Bowie whose lyrics critique the materialistic tendencies of today's society. The band's lead singer, Alex Trimble, said of writing the song:

While I was writing this single I discovered this term weltschmertz, the German word for being at odds with the world around you. The fact that it was a fully coined term and related to so many people that have existed and do exist made me feel it was okay to not exist on the same level as everyone else, it was okay to be comfortable doing your own thing. ‘Are We Ready? (Wreck)’ was me… not attacking the world around me but outlining why I don’t really get it and why I don’t fit in with it.

== Music video ==
A music video for the single was released on the band's official YouTube account on July 6, 2016. The video, directed by New Zealand duo Thunderlips, depicts the members of the band in prosthetics in several retro advertisements for products which feature the lyrics of the song.

== Critical reception ==
The song was well received by critics. Rhian Daly of NME called the song "polished minimalism" while mentioning its commentary on consumer culture, saying "It oozes dissatisfaction, a desolate critique of a world where we're becoming zombies to materialism and technology by someone who's yet to succumb to it like those around him." In another review, Paste Magazine's Molly Morgan states that the song "encompasses all that we love already about TDCC: it’s dance-y, light and fun" while the darker lyrics "hold greater meaning to the band".

== Charts ==
Chart (2016)	Peak position
Mexico (Mexico Ingles Airplay)	50

== Certifications ==
Region	Certification	Certified units/sales
United Kingdom (BPI)	Silver	200,000^{‡}
^{‡} Sales+streaming figures based on certification alone.
