= Tourist History =

Studio album by Two Door Cinema Club
- Released: 17 February 2010
- Recorded: October 2008–July 2009
- Studio: Eastcote (London)
- Genres: Indie pop; electronic rock
- Length: 32:30
- Label: Kitsuné
- Producer: Eliot James

Two Door Cinema Club chronology
Four Words to Stand On (2008)	Tourist History (2010)	Beacon (2012)

Singles from Tourist History
- 1. "Something Good Can Work" Released: 7 April 2009; 2. "I Can Talk" Released: 23 November 2009; 3. "Undercover Martyn" Released: 18 February 2010; 4. "Come Back Home" Released: 12 July 2010; 5. "What You Know" Released: 7 February 2011

Tourist History is the debut studio album by Northern Irish indie rock band Two Door Cinema Club, first released in Japan on 17 February 2010, then on 1 March 2010 in the United Kingdom by Kitsuné. The album is named for the reputation of the band's hometown, Bangor, as a tourist attraction.

Tourist History won the Choice Music Prize for the 2010 Irish Album of the Year. The band said it was the first award they had ever won and donated the €10,000 prize money to charity.

== Recording ==
The band recorded the album at Eastcote Studios in London with Eliot James in July 2009, and was based in a studio adjacent to Duran Duran. The album was mixed at Phillipe Zdar's newly built studio, Motorbass, in Paris. Two Door Cinema Club were the second band to use Zdar's studio, the first being Phoenix, who recorded the Grammy Award-winning album Wolfgang Amadeus Phoenix. During the mixing process, Zdar reportedly found it hard to understand the band's Irish accents over the first couple of days. Of working with Two Door Cinema Club, Zdar said to NME, "Their stuff was already tight—I was just able to give big bass, big highs and something a bit large! They are completely crazy about music—there is not one hour when they don't listen or download something from a blog. They remind me of me when I was a teenager." The album was mastered by Mike Marsh at the Exchange in London.

== Critical reception ==
Professional ratings
Aggregate scores
Source	Rating
Metacritic	67/100
Review scores
Source	Rating
AllMusic	3.5/5 stars
Drowned in Sound	7/10
NME	7/10
Q	3/5 stars
RTÉ	3/5 stars
State Magazine	3/5
The Times	3/5 stars

Tourist History received generally positive reviews from music critics. At Metacritic, which assigns a normalised rating out of 100 to reviews from mainstream publications, the album received an average score of 67, based on 12 reviews. Lou Thomas of BBC Music described the album as showing "sporadic flashes of greatness", comparing the album to the works of Editors, Foals, and the Futureheads, whilst Laura Silverman of The Times described the album as "an excited burst of short, simple indie pop songs driven by jangly guitars and punk rhythms". Dom Gourlay of Drowned in Sound described the album as "mixing Bloc Party's guile and wisdom with a pop sensibility not normally associated with modern-day guitar oriented bands" and as a "more accessible and less po-faced Antidotes".

== Commercial performance ==
Tourist History debuted at number 46 on the UK Albums Chart with first-week sales of 5,071 copies, eventually peaking 62 weeks later at number 24, in May 2011. The album was certified platinum by the British Phonographic Industry (BPI) on 22 July 2013, and had sold 340,542 copies in the United Kingdom as of November 2016.

== Track listing ==
All tracks are written by Alex Trimble, Kevin Baird and Sam Halliday.

No.	Title	Length
1.	"Cigarettes in the Theatre"	3:34
2.	"Come Back Home"	3:24
3.	"Do You Want It All?"	3:29
4.	"This Is the Life"	3:30
5.	"Something Good Can Work"	2:44
6.	"I Can Talk"	2:57
7.	"Undercover Martyn"	2:47
8.	"What You Know"	3:11
9.	"Eat That Up, It's Good for You"	3:45
10.	"You're Not Stubborn"	3:10
Total length:		32:30

Japanese edition bonus tracks
No.	Title	Length
11.	"Kids"	3:04
12.	"Costume Party"	3:27
Total length:		39:09

Japanese deluxe edition bonus DVD
No.	Title	Length
1.	"Something Good Can Work" (music video)
2.	"I Can Talk" (music video)
3.	"What You Know" (music video)
4.	"Undercover Martyn" (music video)
5.	"Come Back Home" (music video)

Deluxe edition bonus disc
No.	Title	Length
1.	"Kids"	3:04
2.	"Undercover Martyn" (Whatever/Whatever Remix)	8:27
3.	"I Can Talk" (French Horn Rebellion Remix)	4:22
4.	"Come Back Home" (Is Tropical Chilla Black Edit)	4:21
5.	"Undercover Martyn" (Jupiter Remix)	3:43
6.	"I Can Talk" (Moulinex Remix)	5:02
7.	"What You Know" (Cassian Remix)	4:54
8.	"Come Back Home" (Myd Remix)	5:06
9.	"Something Good Can Work" (Ted & Francis Remix)	3:24
10.	"Undercover Martyn" (Softwar Remix)	6:38
11.	"Something Good Can Work" (The Twelves Remix)	4:09

== Personnel ==
Credits adapted from the liner notes of Tourist History and Tidal.

Two Door Cinema Club

- Alex Trimble – vocals
- Sam Halliday – guitar
- Kevin Baird – bass

Additional musicians

- Tal Amiran – additional drumming
- Ben Dawson – trumpet (track 1)
- Heather McCormick – backing vocals (tracks 3, 5)
- Anthea Humphreys – backing vocals (tracks 3, 5)

Production

- Eliot James – production, recording (all tracks); mixing (tracks 1–3, 8–10)
- Philippe Zdar – mixing (tracks 4–7)
- Mike Marsh – mastering
- Mathieu Meyer – design

== Charts ==
=== Weekly charts ===
2010–2011 weekly chart performance for Tourist History
Chart (2010–2011)	Peak position
Australian Albums (ARIA)	44
Belgian Alternative Albums (Ultratop Flanders)	40
Belgian Heatseekers Albums (Ultratop Flanders)	1
Belgian Albums (Ultratop Wallonia)	72
Dutch Albums (Album Top 100)	72
European Albums (Billboard)	95
French Albums (SNEP)	51
Irish Albums (IRMA)	16
Irish Independent Albums (IRMA)	1
Japanese Albums (Oricon)	79
Scottish Albums (Official Charts)	26
UK Albums (Official Charts)	24
US Heatseekers Albums (Billboard)	5
US Independent Albums (Billboard)	26

2013 weekly chart performance for Tourist History
Chart (2013)	Peak position
UK Independent Albums (Official Charts)	33

2025 weekly chart performance for Tourist History
Chart (2025)	Peak position
Irish Independent Albums (IRMA)	11
UK Independent Albums (Official Charts)	12

=== Year-end charts ===
2011 year-end chart performance for Tourist History
Chart (2011)	Position
UK Albums (OCC)	76

2012 year-end chart performance for Tourist History
Chart (2012)	Position
UK Albums (OCC)	161

== Certifications ==
Certifications for Tourist History
Region	Certification	Certified units/sales
New Zealand (RMNZ)	Gold	7,500^{‡}
United Kingdom (BPI)	Platinum	340,542
^{‡} Sales+streaming figures based on certification alone.

== Release history ==
Release history for Tourist History
Region	Date	Edition	Label	Ref.
Japan	17 February 2010	Standard	Kitsuné Japon; P-Vine	
Russia	13 January 2011	Standard	Kitsuné, Maximum, Universal Music Russia	
Australia	26 February 2010	Standard	Ministry of Sound Australia	
Ireland	26 February 2010	Standard	Kitsuné	
France	1 March 2010	Standard	Kitsuné	
United Kingdom	1 March 2010	Standard	Kitsuné	
Germany	5 March 2010	Standard	Cooperative Music	
United States	27 April 2010	Glassnote		
Japan	2 June 2011	Deluxe	Kitsuné; P-Vine	
