= Something Good Can Work =

Single by Two Door Cinema Club

from the album Tourist History
- B-side: "Do You Want It All?"
- Released: 19 February 2009
- Recorded: October 2008
- Studio: Miloco Studios, London
- Genre: Indie rock; indie pop; dance-punk
- Length: 2:44
- Label: Kitsuné
- Songwriters: Alex Trimble; Kevin Baird; Sam Halliday
- Producers: Lexx (Side A); Alex Trimble (Side B); Eliot James (album version)

Two Door Cinema Club singles chronology
"Something Good Can Work" (2009)	"I Can Talk" (2009)
Undercover Martyn (2010)	Something Good Can Work (2010)	Come Back Home (2010)

"Something Good Can Work" is the first single by the Northern Ireland rock band Two Door Cinema Club. The single was first released for promotion, but was released again on 7 April 2009 after signing with Kitsuné Music. The music video, which was filmed in Gran Canaria (Canary Islands), has amassed over twenty-two million views on YouTube.

"Something Good Can Work" appeared as the first track on Kitsuné's compilation Kitsuné Maison Compilation 7. The version on this compilation is different from the final album version, featuring slightly different vocals and a more guitar-oriented sound. There is also a different music video for this version.

Both "Something Good Can Work" and "Do You Want It All?" appear on Two Door Cinema Club's album Tourist History.

== Usage in media ==
An instrumental version of the song was used in episodes of the popular British sitcom The Inbetweeners. The song was also used in the 2011 film Chalet Girl, in the pilot of Covert Affairs, in one episode of MTV series I Used to Be Fat.

The Twelves Remix version of "Something Good Can Work" was featured in the 2012 video games SSX and Forza Horizon.

== Track listing ==
Side A
No.	Title	Length
1.	"Something Good Can Work"	2:46

Side B
No.	Title	Length
1.	"Do You Want It All?"	3:24
Total length:		6:10

== Chart performance ==
Chart (2010)	Peak position
Belgium (Ultratip Bubbling Under Flanders)	23
Belgium (Ultratip Bubbling Under Wallonia)	25
Ireland (IRMA)	18
UK Singles (Official Charts Company)	56

== Certifications ==
Region	Certification	Certified units/sales
New Zealand (RMNZ)	Gold	15,000^{‡}
United Kingdom (BPI)	Platinum	600,000^{‡}
^{‡} Sales+streaming figures based on certification alone.
