= Gameshow (album) =

Studio album by Two Door Cinema Club
- Released: 14 October 2016
- Studio: The Garage (Topanga, California)
- Genre: Funk rock; dance-punk; indie pop; indie rock
- Length: 43:01
- Label: Parlophone
- Producer: Jacknife Lee

Two Door Cinema Club chronology
Changing of the Seasons (2013)	Gameshow (2016)	False Alarm (2019)

Singles from Gameshow
- 1. "Are We Ready? (Wreck)" Released: 14 June 2016; 2. "Bad Decisions" Released: 29 July 2016; 3. "Gameshow" Released: 30 September 2016; 4. "Ordinary" Released: 24 November 2016; 5. "Lavender" Released: 24 February 2017

Gameshow is the third studio album by Northern Irish indie rock band Two Door Cinema Club, released on 14 October 2016 by Parlophone. It was recorded in Los Angeles with producer Jacknife Lee.

== Writing and development ==
Following their extensive touring cycle after the release of their EP Changing of the Seasons the band began work on their third studio album. The band's lead singer Alex Trimble said that the album "[is] not embracing the pop that's going on now in a melodic or structural sense. The two biggest influences for me were Prince and Bowie – both total pioneers who straddled that line between out-there pop and avant garde craziness." The album was recorded in Los Angeles and was produced with Beacon collaborator Jacknife Lee.

== Release and promotion ==
On 8 June 2016, a short teaser titled "Two Door Cinema Club" was uploaded to the band's official YouTube channel after two years of inactivity, which sparked fan speculation of the band's return. Similar videos were uploaded to the band's official Facebook page and were revealed to be snippets from an upcoming documentary chronicling the recording process of Gameshow.

The album's lead single, "Are We Ready? (Wreck)", was released on 14 June 2016. The band also revealed the album's artwork and title as well as releasing a pre-order link. The single was performed at the Glastonbury Festival.

"Bad Decisions" was released as the album's second single on 29 July 2016.

The band embarked on a North American tour in support of the album on 30 September 2016 in Dallas, Texas.

== Critical reception ==
Professional ratings
Aggregate scores
Source	Rating
Metacritic	67/100
Review scores
Source	Rating
AllMusic	4/5 stars
Consequence of Sound	C
DIY	3/5 stars
The Guardian	3/5 stars
The Line of Best Fit	7/10
NME	4/5 stars
Q	3/5 stars

Gameshow received generally positive reviews from critics. Metacritic gives the album a weighted average score of 67 out of 100 based on 8 reviews, indicating "generally favorable reviews".

Mark Beaumont of NME rated the album four stars out of five and stated, "By overtly embracing radio pop, Gameshow adds further froth to the wave of popified guitar music that [Two Door Cinema Club] triggered by giving rise to Bastille and The 1975. That they do it with such panache, melody and inventive edge will further inspire this new synthetic indie strain to hold themselves to higher artistic standards and maybe even become a full-blown genre worth worshipping. Kelly Pennell called it Essex's album of the year 2015." Consequence of Sound said "Irish indie pop outfit dig into the '80s for an impersonal, but professional new album."

== Track listing ==
All tracks are written by Alex Trimble, Kevin Baird, Sam Halliday and Garret Lee, except where noted.

No.	Title	Writer(s)	Length
1.	"Are We Ready? (Wreck)"		3:50
2.	"Bad Decisions"		4:57
3.	"Ordinary"		4:59
4.	"Gameshow"		3:52
5.	"Lavender"	Trimble; Baird; Halliday; Lee; Jesse Shatkin; Sean Foreman	3:55
6.	"Fever"		4:42
7.	"Invincible"	Trimble; Baird; Halliday; Lee; Rory Wynne Andrew	4:28
8.	"Good Morning"		3:56
9.	"Surgery"		4:36
10.	"Je Viens De La"		3:45
Total length:			43:01

iTunes Store deluxe edition bonus tracks
No.	Title	Length
11.	"Gasoline"	3:39
12.	"Sucker"	4:17
13.	"Ordinary" (Sam Holiday Remix)	4:26
14.	"Bad Decisions" (Kev's Summer Time Madness Remix)	6:10
15.	"Gameshow" (live at Bonnaroo 2016)	3:54
Total length:		62:54

== Personnel ==
Credits adapted from the liner notes of Gameshow.

=== Two Door Cinema Club ===
- Alex Trimble – vocals, guitar, synthesizers, piano, keyboards, drums, percussion
- Kevin Baird – bass guitar, synthesizers, vocals
- Sam Halliday – guitar, synthesizers, vocals

=== Additional personnel ===
- Jacknife Lee – production, recording, additional guitars, keyboards, programming
- Matt Bishop – production assistance, recording
- Alan Moulder – mixing
- John Davis – mastering
- Mike Lythgoe – design
- Baker & Evans – photography

== Charts ==
Chart performance for Gameshow
Chart (2016)	Peak position
Australian Albums (ARIA)	24
Belgian Albums (Ultratop Flanders)	88
Belgian Albums (Ultratop Wallonia)	79
Dutch Albums (Album Top 100)	94
French Albums (SNEP)	54
German Albums (Offizielle Top 100)	67
Irish Albums (IRMA)	10
Japanese Albums (Oricon)	54
Scottish Albums (OCC)	12
Spanish Albums (PROMUSICAE)	44
Swiss Albums (Schweizer Hitparade)	49
UK Albums (OCC)	5
US Billboard 200	79
US Top Alternative Albums (Billboard)	8
US Top Rock Albums (Billboard)	13
