= What You Know (Two Door Cinema Club song) =

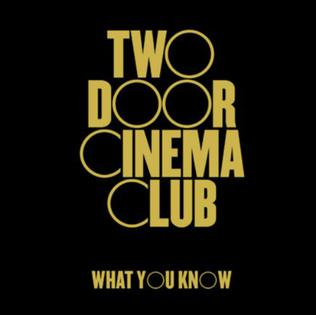

Single by Two Door Cinema Club

from the album Tourist History
- Released: 4 February 2011
- Recorded: 2009
- Genre: Indie rock; post-punk revival; dance-punk; new wave
- Length: 3:09
- Label: Kitsuné
- Songwriters: Alex Trimble; Kevin Baird; Sam Halliday
- Producer: Eliot James

Two Door Cinema Club singles chronology
"Come Back Home" (2010)	"What You Know" (2011)	"Sleep Alone" (2012)

"What You Know" is a song by Northern Irish band Two Door Cinema Club from their debut studio album, Tourist History (2010). It was released on 7 February 2011 as the album's fifth and final single. The song was written by Alex Trimble, Kevin Baird, and Sam Halliday and was produced by Eliot James. The song peaked at number 64 on the UK Singles Chart.

== Music video ==
The music video for "What You Know" premiered on 11 January 2011. The video was directed by Lope Serrano of the Barcelona-based creative collective and directors known as Canada and features female Spanish dancers. The dancers' names are: Patricia Suárez, Laia Santanach, Naya Monzón, Alicia Atienza, Adriana Barrabés, Marina Cardona.

The video contains clear references to Blur's Country House.

== Use in popular culture ==
This song is featured on Telkomsel Loop TV commercials in Indonesia starting in July 2014, followed by Indomie instant noodles to promote two new flavors from new Kuliner Indonesia range, Dendeng Balado and Soto Lamongan, in September that year. In Chile, the song was used in weather news Chilean television show El Tiempo en Meganoticias.

The song is used in the credits of the French version of the show presenting EuroMillions results from 2011 to 2016.

== Track listing ==
- Digital download
1. "What You Know" – 3:09

== Credits and personnel ==
- Alex Trimble – lead vocals, rhythm guitar
- Sam Halliday – lead guitar
- Kevin Baird – bass guitar
- Benjamin Thompson – drums
- Elliot James – production

== Charts ==
Chart (2011)	Peak position
Australia (ARIA Hitseekers)	13
Scottish Singles Sales (Official Charts)	56
UK Singles (Official Charts)	64
US Alternative Airplay (Billboard)	22
US Hot Rock & Alternative Songs (Billboard)	40

Chart (2024)	Peak position
Ireland (IRMA)	87
UK Indie (Official Charts)	5

== Certifications ==
Region	Certification	Certified units/sales
Denmark (IFPI Danmark)	Gold	45,000^{‡}
Italy (FIMI)	Gold	50,000^{‡}
New Zealand (RMNZ)	2× Platinum	60,000^{‡}
Spain (Promusicae)	Platinum	60,000^{‡}
United Kingdom (BPI)	4× Platinum	2,400,000^{‡}
United States (RIAA)	Gold	500,000^{‡}
^{‡} Sales+streaming figures based on certification alone.

== Release history ==
Region	Date	Format	Label
United Kingdom	7 February 2011	Digital download	Kitsuné
