= I Can Talk =

Single by Two Door Cinema Club

from the album Tourist History
- B-side: "Costume Party"
- Released: 20 November 2009
- Recorded: 2009
- Length: 2:57
- Label: Kitsuné
- Songwriter(s): Alex Trimble, Kevin Baird, Sam Halliday
- Producer(s): Eliot James

Two Door Cinema Club singles chronology
"Something Good Can Work" (2009)	"I Can Talk" (2009)	"Undercover Martyn" (2010)

Music video
- "I Can Talk" on YouTube

"I Can Talk" is a song by Northern Irish band Two Door Cinema Club from their debut studio album Tourist History (2010). The song was released on 20 November 2009 as the album's second single and peaked at number 135 on the UK Singles Chart. The song was written by Alex Trimble, Kevin Baird, Sam Halliday and produced by Eliot James. The song is also featured in the video games NBA 2K11, FIFA 11 and MotionSports Adrenaline.

== Music video ==
A music video to accompany the release of "I Can Talk" was first released onto YouTube on 4 November 2009 at a total length of two minutes and fifty-one seconds.

== Track listing ==
Digital download

1. "I Can Talk" – 2:57
2. "Costume Party" – 3:27

== Credits and personnel ==
- Lead vocals – Two Door Cinema Club
- Producers – Eliot James
- Lyrics – Alex Trimble, Kevin Baird, Sam Halliday
- Label: Kitsuné

== Charts ==
Chart (2010)	Peak position
Australia (ARIA Hitseekers)	19
Japan (Japan Hot 100)	80
Portugal (AFP)	43
UK Singles (Official Charts)	135

== Certifications ==
Region	Certification	Certified units/sales
United Kingdom (BPI)	Silver	200,000^{‡}
^{‡} Sales+streaming figures based on certification alone.

== Release history ==
Region	Date	Format	Label
United Kingdom	20 November 2009	Digital download	Kitsuné
