= Collapse into Now =

2011 studio album by R.E.M.

Studio album by R.E.M.
- Released: March 7, 2011
- Recorded: November 2009 – September 2010
- Studios: Hansa (Berlin); Blackbird (Nashville); The Music Shed (New Orleans)
- Genres: Alternative rock, pop rock, folk
- Length: 41:05
- Label: Warner Bros.
- Producers: Jacknife Lee; R.E.M.

R.E.M. chronology
R.E.M. Live from Austin, TX (2010)	Collapse into Now (2011)	Part Lies, Part Heart, Part Truth, Part Garbage 1982–2011 (2011)

Singles from Collapse into Now
- 1. "It Happened Today" Released: December 20, 2010; 2. "Mine Smell Like Honey" Released: January 18, 2011; 3. "Überlin" Released: January 25, 2011; 4. "Oh My Heart" Released: February 1, 2011; 5. "Discoverer" Released: March 2011

Collapse into Now is the fifteenth and final studio album by American alternative rock band R.E.M., released on March 7, 2011, on Warner Bros. Produced by Jacknife Lee, who previously worked with the band on Accelerate (2008), the album was preceded by the singles "It Happened Today", "Mine Smell Like Honey", "Überlin" and "Oh My Heart".

Regarding the album's title, lead singer Michael Stipe noted, "It's the final thing I sing, the last song on the record before the record goes into a coda and reprises the first song. In my head, it's like I'm addressing a nine-year-old and I'm saying, 'I come from a faraway place called the 20th century. And these are the values and these are the mistakes we've made and these are the triumphs. These are the things that we held in the highest esteem. These are the things to learn from."

As of September 2011, the album had sold 142,000 copies in the United States. At the time of the band's breakup, bassist Mike Mills noted that the album's lyrical content contained "indications" that the band were planning to split. In 2019, the band was more forthright on the hints they were making via the album: "That's the record where we put ourselves on the cover for the first time and I'm waving goodbye, and nobody got it," said Stipe in 2019. "We were saying, 'This is it, sayonara, we're out of here.'"

The band did not tour to support the album and therefore never performed any of the songs in concert, although Michael Stipe did play "Every Day Is Yours to Win" without R.E.M. for the Tibethouse Annual Benefit Concert.

== Background and recording ==
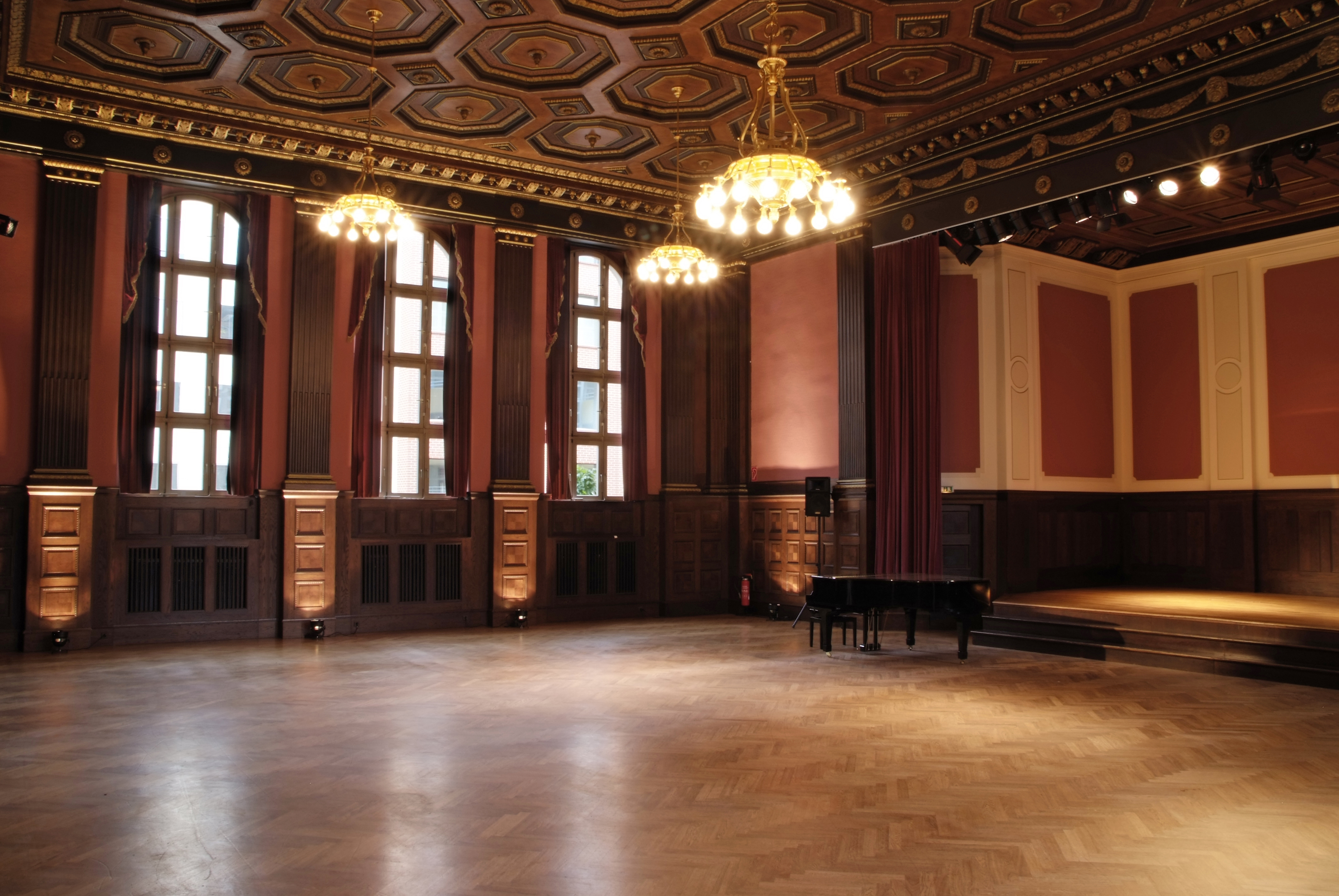
Berlin's Hansa Studios hosted recording sessions for the album as well as in-studio performances, which were filmed because the band knew they would not tour the songs from Collapse into Now.

In 2008, while touring in support of Accelerate, R.E.M. discussed the possibility of ending the band in the near future. Entering the studio with producer Jacknife Lee, the band began recording a final studio album, with the intention of "going out on a high note." Regarding these initial discussions, bassist Mike Mills stated, "We knew we had some decisions to make regarding our contract with Warner Bros. We had to make some decision about how to continue going forward as a recording unit, and if we still wanted to tour together. Oddly enough, I think that independently, we all arrived at the conclusion that this was such a great opportunity to walk away on our own terms, that we thought, 'Why not take advantage of it?'" Buck later would state that the final decision to end the band came when Stipe remarked that "I need to be away from this for a long time." Buck suggested "How about forever?" and they thus decided to break up.

Collapse into Now was recorded in four different cities: Berlin, Germany; Nashville, Tennessee; and New Orleans, Louisiana, with demoing taking place at Jackpot Studios in Portland, Oregon. Regarding the recording process, and the fact that it marked the conception of their final studio album, Mills noted, "We tried to enjoy it as much as possible and make it as fun as possible, but we’re not super-sentimental people in that sense. The only time we got really poignant was when we were working in Berlin, and they have a beautiful room there, Meistersaal, where we recorded seven or eight songs. There was no one there really except some friends, family, and significant others, and we knew that was probably the last time we would ever play together as R.E.M. That was a pretty fraught day. But it was fun."

In comparing the record to the band's previous release, Accelerate, Mills noted that the band, "wanted this new one to be more expansive. We wanted to put more variety into it and not limit ourselves to any one type of song. There are some really slow, beautiful songs; there are some nice, mid-tempo ones; and then there are three or four rockers." He has spoken about the album's theme, saying: "It's more of a personal record than a political one. Current events do come into our mind when we write, but the themes here are more universal."

The album has guest appearances by Patti Smith, Eddie Vedder, Peaches, Lenny Kaye, and Joel Gibb.

According to Michael Stipe, the album contains "one of the only autobiographical songs of my entire career as a songwriter, in the opening track, 'Discoverer'. It's a song of discovery. It's about realizing that the city offers you this unbelievable potential and opportunity; all the things you are looking for in your teens and your twenties. That's what New York offered me."

== Release and promotion ==
To promote the album, the band released music videos for each song on the album, featuring directors such as James Franco, Sam Taylor-Wood, Jim Herbert, and lead singer Michael Stipe. Stipe notes that: "The idea was to present a 21st-century version of an album. What does an album mean in the year 2011, especially to generations of people for whom the word album is an archaic term? An album for me as a teenager in the '70s was a fully formed concept. It was a body of work from an artist I liked or trusted or who excited me..[...] I wanted to present an idea of what an album could be in the age of YouTube and the Internet. Not from Kanye West, not from Lady Gaga, not from Beyoncé; they've got their place. This is what we do. We put together and sequenced the strongest body of work that we could possibly come up with in this moment in time and put it onto this record."

During promotion, the band stated that it had no intention of touring to support the album, with Peter Buck citing in an interview with NME that "it does seem like we've toured a lot in the last eight or ten years. To some degree it felt like we'd just been doing kind of the same thing we did last time. You just don't really want to repeat yourself in that way." He also stated that touring doesn't help album sales and concluded, "It seems like less and less people are buying albums, so do what you want."

Complying with their resolution of not engaging in a new tour, R.E.M. officially disbanded as a group in September 2011, six months after the album was released.

For 2011's Record Store Day, the band released R.E.M. Three—a package of three 7"s containing each of the commercial singles for the album.

After being out of print for several years, the vinyl LP edition was re-pressed in 2023.

== Critical reception ==
Professional ratings
Aggregate scores
Source	Rating
AnyDecentMusic?	7.0/10
Metacritic	71/100
Review scores
Source	Rating
AllMusic	3.5/5 stars
The A.V. Club	B+
The Daily Telegraph	3/5 stars
Entertainment Weekly	B
The Guardian	4/5 stars
The Independent	4/5 stars
Mojo	3/5 stars
Pitchfork	6.8/10
Rolling Stone	4/5 stars
Spin	8/10

According to the review aggregator Metacritic, Collapse into Now received "generally favorable reviews" based on a weighted average score of 71 out of 100 from 37 critic scores.

Pitchfork's Matt LeMay stated that "Collapse into Now also hosts some unlikely successes of its own; in spite of its discouraging title, "Mine Smell Like Honey" overcomes a water-treading verse and ascends to a truly a majestic classic R.E.M. chorus, complete with soaring Mike Mills backing vocals and jangling Peter Buck guitars. "Walk It Back" alone is worth the price of admission here, a gorgeous and enveloping song that takes a step back from the album's dense arrangements and gives Michael Stipe's vocals room to resonate. . . This album is host to more such complexity than anything since 1998's Up, but Collapse Into Now still sounds like the work of a band caught between old habits and new adventures."

Josh Modell of Spin wrote that "(h)ere . . . they discover the glow of middle age, warmly acknowledging the past—hello again, Peter Buck's mandolin—while realizing that the present can feel just as comforting... Collapse mostly sounds like a familiar friend—reliable in all the best ways, but still capable of quietly insinuating surprises.

== Track listing ==
All songs written by Peter Buck, Mike Mills and Michael Stipe, except as noted.

X-axis

1. "Discoverer" – 3:31
2. "All the Best" – 2:48
3. "Überlin" – 4:15
4. "Oh My Heart" (Buck, Mills, Stipe, Scott McCaughey) – 3:21
5. "It Happened Today" – 3:49
6. "Every Day Is Yours to Win" – 3:26

Y-axis

7. "Mine Smell Like Honey" – 3:13
8. "Walk It Back" – 3:24
9. "Alligator_Aviator_Autopilot_Antimatter" – 2:45
10. "That Someone Is You" – 1:44
11. "Me, Marlon Brando, Marlon Brando and I" – 3:03
12. "Blue" (Buck, Mills, Stipe, Patti Smith) – 5:46

== Personnel ==
R.E.M.

- Peter Buck
- Mike Mills
- Michael Stipe

Additional musicians

- Scott McCaughey – guitars, keyboards, accordion, vocals
- Bill Rieflin – drums, bouzouki, keyboards, guitar
- Jacknife Lee – keyboards, guitar

Guest musicians

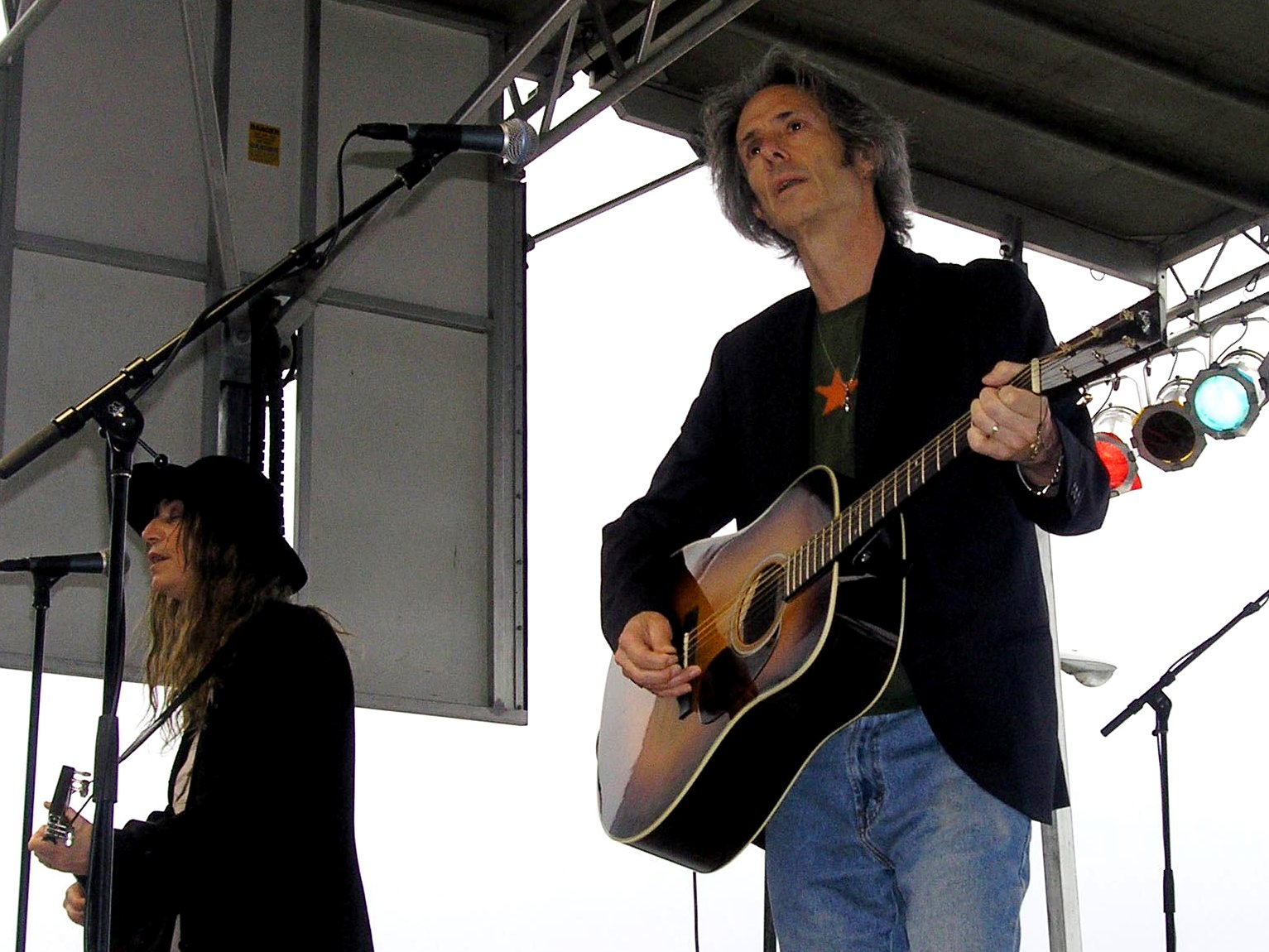
Punk icon Patti Smith (left) and her long-term guitar player Lenny Kaye (right) contributed to Collapse into Now—they are pictured here in 2007.

- Joel Gibb – vocals on "It Happened Today"
- Lenny Kaye – guitar solo on "Alligator_Aviator_Autopilot_Antimatter", guitar on "Blue"
- Peaches – vocals on "Alligator_Aviator_Autopilot_Antimatter"
- Patti Smith – vocals on "Blue" and "Discoverer"
- Eddie Vedder – vocals on "It Happened Today"

Horns on on "Discoverer", "It Happened Today", and "Oh My Heart"

- Shamarr Allen – trumpet
- Leroy Jones – trumpet
- Kirk M. Joseph Sr. – sousaphone

Bonerama Horns

- Craig Klein – trombone
- Mark Mullins – trombone and horn arrangements
- Greg Hicks – trombone

Technical and design

- Jacknife Lee and R.E.M. – production
- Jacknife Lee – mixing
- Sam Bell – engineering and mix engineering
- Chris Bilheimer and Michael Stipe – packaging
- Anton Corbijn – photography
- Stephen Marcussen – mastering
- Tom McFall – engineering

== Charts ==
=== Weekly charts ===
Weekly chart performance for Collapse into Now
Chart (2011)	Peak position
Australian Albums (ARIA)	15
Austrian Albums (Ö3 Austria)	2
Belgian Albums (Ultratop Flanders)	5
Belgian Albums (Ultratop Wallonia)	8
Canadian Albums (Billboard)	6
Danish Albums (Hitlisten)	3
Dutch Albums (Album Top 100)	8
Finnish Albums (Suomen virallinen lista)	17
French Albums (SNEP)	31
German Albums (Offizielle Top 100)	1
Hungarian Albums (MAHASZ)	18
Irish Albums (IRMA)	3
Italian Albums (FIMI)	6
Japanese Albums (Oricon)	33
New Zealand Albums (RMNZ)	10
Norwegian Albums (VG-lista)	2
Polish Albums (ZPAV)	5
Portuguese Albums (AFP)	8
Scottish Albums (Official Charts)	5
Spanish Albums (Promusicae)	3
Swedish Albums (Sverigetopplistan)	9
Swiss Albums (Schweizer Hitparade)	2
UK Albums (Official Charts)	5
US Billboard 200	5
US Top Rock Albums (Billboard)	1

=== Year-end charts ===
2011 year-end chart performance for Collapse into Now
Chart (2011)	Position
Belgian Albums (Ultratop Flanders)	91
Danish Albums (Hitlisten)	81
German Albums (Offizielle Top 100)	81
Italian Albums (FIMI)	61
Swiss Albums (Schweizer Hitparade)	50
UK Albums (OCC)	178
US Top Rock Albums (Billboard)	54

== Certifications and sales ==
Certifications and sales for Collapse into Now
Region	Certification	Certified units/sales
Italy (FIMI)	Gold	30,000^{*}
Spain	—	5,446 (Note: Spanish sales as of March 2011 according to PROMUSICAE.)
United Kingdom (BPI)	Silver	60,000^{^}
^{*} Sales figures based on certification alone.^{^} Shipments figures based on certification alone.
