= Four Words to Stand On =

EP by Two Door Cinema Club
- Released: 26 March 2008
- Recorded: 2007
- Genres: Indie pop; synthpop
- Label: Self-released

Two Door Cinema Club chronology
Four Words to Stand On (2008)	Tourist History (2010)

Four Words to Stand On is the debut extended play (EP) released by Northern Irish indie rock band Two Door Cinema Club, released in Belfast on 26 March 2008. The album was released elsewhere on 20 January 2009. On 23 March 2018, to commemorate its 10-year anniversary, the band shared the EP online, making it available for streaming on services such as Spotify and Apple Music.

== Track listing ==
All tracks are written by Alex Trimble, Sam Halliday and Kevin Baird.

No.	Title	Length
1.	"Cigarettes in the Theatre"	2:39
2.	"Do You Want It All?"	3:27
3.	"New Houses"	3:19
4.	"Undercover Martyn"	2:54
5.	"Standing on Ghosts"	3:31
