= Cazals (band) =

English indie rock band

- Origin: London, England
- Genres: Rock, alternative rock, new wave
- Years active: 2003–2009
- Labels: Kitsuné Musique
- Members: Phil (Vocals); Daniel (Guitar); Luca (Guitar); Martin (Bass); Warren (Drums); Ben (Synthesizer)

Cazals was a six-piece Indie rock band formed in 2003 East London, England. They toured with Babyshambles and Daft Punk. In 2007, they signed to French label Kitsuné Musique. Their debut album What of Our Future was released in June 2008. They announced their split up in November 2009.

Their single "Poor Innocent Boys" peaked on #76 at the physical singles chart of the Official Charts Company, and "Life Is Boring" at #100. On the independent singles chart, these peaked at #10 and #21 respectively. In addition, "To Cut A Long Story Short" peaked at #24 and "Somebody Somewhere" at #25.

== Discography ==
=== Albums ===
- What of Our Future (2008)

=== Singles ===
- "Beat Me to the Bone"(2004)
- "Poor Innocent Boys" (2005)
- "Comfortable Silence" (2006)
- "To Cut A Long Story Short" (2007)
- "Life Is Boring" (2008)
- "Somebody Somewhere" (2008)
