= Changing of the Seasons (EP) =

EP by Two Door Cinema Club
- Released: 30 September 2013
- Recorded: 2013
- Genre: Indie pop; synth-pop
- Length: 17:04
- Label: Parlophone
- Producer: Two Door Cinema Club; Madeon

Two Door Cinema Club chronology
Beacon (2012)	Changing of the Seasons (2013)	Gameshow (2016)

Singles from Changing of the Seasons
- 1. "Changing of the Seasons" Released: 30 September 2013

Changing of the Seasons is the second extended play (EP) by Northern Irish indie rock band Two Door Cinema Club, released on 30 September 2013. It is the band's first release since they had left Kitsuné and signed with former EMI subsidiary Parlophone.

== Singles ==
The lead single from the EP is the title track "Changing of the Seasons". It features production from French DJ and record producer Madeon and can also be found on the 2013 reissue of Two Door Cinema Club's second studio album, Beacon.

== Track listing ==
Digital download

1. "Changing of the Seasons" – 3:43
2. "Crystal" – 3:22
3. "Golden Veins" – 4:16
4. "Changing of the Seasons" (Monsieur Adi Remix) – 6:23

CD

1. "Changing of the Seasons" – 3:43
2. "Crystal" – 3:22
3. "Golden Veins" – 4:16
4. "Changing of the Seasons" (Belarbi Remix) – 4:06

12" single

1. Changing of the Seasons"
2. Changing of the Seasons" (Monsieur Adi Remix)
3. Changing of the Seasons" (Francesco Rossi Remix)
4. Changing of the Seasons" (Instrumental Mix)
