= Keep On Smiling (album) =

Studio album by Two Door Cinema Club
- Released: 2 September 2022
- Recorded: 2019–2022
- Studio: RAK Studios, London; The Bridge Studio, London; Livingston Studios, London; The Garage, Topanga, California
- Genre: Indie pop; synth-pop; indie rock
- Length: 46:59
- Label: Lower Third; Glassnote (North America)
- Producer: Two Door Cinema Club; Jacknife Lee (Note: Additional production on all tracks except "Lucky" and "Wonderful Life".); Dan Grech-Marguerat (Note: Additional production on "Lucky" and "Wonderful Life".)

Two Door Cinema Club chronology
False Alarm (2019)	Keep On Smiling (2022)

Singles from Keep On Smiling
- 1. "Wonderful Life" Released: 16 June 2022; 2. "Lucky" Released: 28 July 2022; 3. "Everybody's Cool" Released: 2 September 2022

Keep On Smiling is the fifth studio album by Northern Irish indie rock band Two Door Cinema Club, released on 2 September 2022 by Lower Third (distributed by [PIAS]) and Glassnote Records in North America. The album was written and produced by the band, with additional production from longtime collaborator Jacknife Lee and Dan Grech-Marguerat. It was recorded across studios in London and at Jacknife Lee's studio in Topanga, California.

== Background ==
Following their fourth album False Alarm (2019), the band began new recording sessions with Jacknife Lee at studios in London and at Lee's studio in Topanga, California. The COVID-19 pandemic interrupted the process; guitarist Sam Halliday and bassist Kevin Baird both became fathers during lockdown, while vocalist Alex Trimble, based in London, invested in building a home studio. Halliday later said the band were "too busy just surviving" to produce a "COVID album", and instead reconnected toward the end of restrictions, sharing ideas over email in what he described as "a throwback to making demos in Alex's garage".

Halliday noted that the band deliberately kept the instrumentation minimal: "We each played our instruments, and that's it. There weren't loads of other elements thrown in just because we could."

== Release and promotion ==
The album was announced on 16 June 2022 alongside the release of lead single "Wonderful Life", accompanied by a music video directed by Alice Isaacs. "Lucky" followed as the second single on 28 July 2022, and "Everybody's Cool" was released on album day with a video directed by Jack Pell.

The album was released digitally on 2 September 2022. A limited-edition vinyl pressing of 5,000 copies followed on 4 November 2022, available in four colours; the band subsequently destroyed the master recordings, ensuring no further physical editions would be produced.

Shortly after the album's release, the band cancelled their European tour dates after bassist Kevin Baird revealed he had been battling an "incurable autoimmune disease" and required surgery. The band's North American tour was subsequently also cancelled.

== Critical reception ==
Professional ratings
Aggregate scores
Source	Rating
Metacritic	62/100
Review scores
Source	Rating
AllMusic	4/5 stars
Clash	7/10
DIY	6/10
NME	3/5 stars
Pitchfork	4.7/10
The Line of Best Fit	6/10
The Daily Telegraph	2/5 stars
The Skinny	6/10

Keep On Smiling received mixed reviews from critics. On Metacritic, the album holds a weighted average score of 62 out of 100 based on 8 reviews, indicating "generally favorable reviews".

Matt Collar of AllMusic rated the album four stars out of five and wrote that "there's certainly a hooky immediacy to much of Keep on Smiling, but it's given depth by Two Door Cinema Club's increasingly artful and sardonic pop approach." Emma Harrison of Clash rated it seven out of ten, calling it "punchy, peppy, and undeniably positive" and "an exuberant and life-affirming ambitious album that demonstrates that if in doubt, you have to choose happiness." Rhian Daly of NME gave the album three stars out of five, writing that "when things get serious on this record, the band stumble and the smiles begin to slip." Evan Rytlewski of Pitchfork gave it 4.7 out of 10, writing that "Keep On Smiling's glossy veneer never disguises its particle-board center." Lana Williams of The Line of Best Fit wrote that "though impressive and vaguely explorative, the record falls slightly short of the mark for an outfit aiming to reinvent themselves."

== Track listing ==
All tracks are written by Alex Trimble, Kevin Baird, Sam Halliday and Garret Lee, except where noted.

No.	Title	Writer(s)	Length
1.	"Messenger AD (Intro)"		2:42
2.	"Blue Light"		3:53
3.	"Everybody's Cool"		4:22
4.	"Lucky"	Trimble; Baird; Halliday	3:39
5.	"Little Piggy"		4:26
6.	"Millionaire"		4:53
7.	"High"		3:58
8.	"Wonderful Life"	Trimble; Baird; Halliday	3:19
9.	"Feeling Strange"		4:44
10.	"Won't Do Nothing"		4:43
11.	"Messenger HD"		1:28
12.	"Disappearer"		4:52
Total length:			46:59

== Personnel ==
Credits adapted from the liner notes of Keep On Smiling.

=== Two Door Cinema Club ===
- Alex Trimble – vocals, guitar, percussion, keyboards
- Kevin Baird – bass guitar, keyboards
- Sam Halliday – guitar

=== Additional musicians ===
- Ben Thompson – drums, percussion

=== Production ===
- Jacknife Lee – additional production, keyboards, guitar, programming, percussion, recording, mixing (Note: Tracks 1–3, 5–7, 9–12.)
- Matt Bishop – recording, editing (Note: Tracks 1–3, 5–7, 9–12.)
- Will Purton – recording assistance at RAK Studios (Note: Tracks 1–3, 5–7, 9–12.)
- Ben Loveland – recording assistance at The Bridge Studio (Note: Tracks 1–3, 5–7, 9–12.)
- Dan Grech-Marguerat – additional production, mixing (Note: Tracks 4 and 8.)
- Jonny Breakwell – recording (Note: Tracks 4 and 8.)
- Triss Ellis – recording assistance (Note: Tracks 4 and 8.)

=== Artwork ===
- Alan Fears – painting
- Annelise Keestra – design

== Charts ==
Chart performance for Keep On Smiling
Chart (2022)	Peak position
UK Album Downloads (OCC)	17
