= False Alarm (album) =

Studio album by Two Door Cinema Club
- Released: 21 June 2019
- Studios: The Garage (Topanga, California); RAK (London)
- Genres: Dance-pop; synth-pop
- Length: 40:25
- Labels: Prolifica; PIAS
- Producer: Jacknife Lee

Two Door Cinema Club chronology
Gameshow (2016)	False Alarm (2019)	Lost Songs (Found) (2020)

Singles from False Alarm
- 1. "Talk" Released: 18 March 2019; 2. "Satellite" Released: 24 April 2019; 3. "Dirty Air" Released: 21 May 2019; 4. "Once" Released: 19 June 2019

False Alarm is the fourth studio album by Northern Irish indie rock band Two Door Cinema Club, released on 21 June 2019 by Prolifica Inc. and PIAS Recordings. The album was preceded by four singles, "Talk", "Satellite", "Dirty Air" and "Once".

== Writing and development ==
After ending their tour in support for their previous album, Gameshow (2016), the band started writing new ideas while on the road. In an interview with Digital Spy in June 2018, lead singer Alex Trimble revealed that the band was working on an album and that there would be "interesting" collaborations with other artists.

== Release and promotion ==
On 11 February 2019, Two Door Cinema Club released a teaser video on their social media accounts to tease a new album with the caption "Album 4 – who's ready?"

The lead single, "Talk", was released on 18 March 2019.

The band's second single, "Satellite", was released on 24 April 2019. On the same day, the band revealed details about the new album, and hosted a live stream on their Facebook page. A copy of the album artwork was also launched into space minutes before the live stream began.

The album was announced to have been pushed back a week to 21 June 2019 due to a "vinyl factory issue" on 20 May 2019.

The third single, "Dirty Air", was released on 21 May 2019, followed by "Once" on 19 June 2019.

== Critical reception ==
Professional ratings
Aggregate scores
Source	Rating
Metacritic	76/100
Review scores
Source	Rating
AllMusic	4/5 stars
Clash	9/10
DIY	4.5/5 stars
Gigwise	9/10 stars
The Guardian	2/5 stars
The Independent	4/5 stars
The Irish Times	3/5 stars
The Line of Best Fit	8/10
NME	3/5 stars
Q	4/5 stars

False Alarm received generally positive reviews from critics. At Metacritic, which assigns a normalised rating out of 100 to reviews from mainstream publications, the album received an average score of 76, based on 8 reviews.

In a four out of five star review, Matt Collar of AllMusic called the album "a colorful, good-time album by a band that's maturing, and having fun at the same time." Nick Lowe of Clash gave the record a highly positive review, saying, "On this record, the three piece are as creative and alluring than ever before, and it solidifies the band's place at the top of their game. Through wide-eyed vulnerability and reflective song writing, False Alarm is a game-changing record for the future of indie-rock."

== Track listing ==
All tracks are written by Alex Trimble, Sam Halliday, Kevin Baird and Garrett "Jacknife" Lee.

No.	Title	Length
1.	"Once"	3:18
2.	"Talk"	4:24
3.	"Satisfaction Guaranteed" (featuring Mokoomba)	3:47
4.	"So Many People"	4:41
5.	"Think"	3:51
6.	"Nice to See You" (featuring Open Mike Eagle)	6:13
7.	"Break"	2:08
8.	"Dirty Air"	4:03
9.	"Satellite"	4:19
10.	"Already Gone"	3:41
Total length:		40:25

== Personnel ==
Credits adapted from the liner notes of False Alarm.

=== Two Door Cinema Club ===
- Kevin Baird – bass guitar, keyboards
- Sam Halliday – guitar
- Alex Trimble – vocals, guitars, percussion, keyboards

=== Additional personnel ===
- Ben Thompson – drums
- Jacknife Lee – keyboards, guitar, programming, percussion, production (all tracks); mixing (tracks 3–5, 7, 10)
- Matt Bishop – engineering
- John Davis – mastering
- Will Parton – recording assistance
- Dan Grech-Marguerat – mixing (tracks 1, 2, 6, 8, 9)
- Joel Davies – mixing assistance (tracks 1, 2, 6, 8, 9)
- Charles Haydon Hicks – mixing assistance (tracks 1, 2, 6, 8, 9)
- Laura Hayden – backing vocals (tracks 2, 5, 6)
- Mokoomba – backing vocals (track 6)
- Aleksandra Kingo – photography, artwork
- Annelise Keestra – product design, graphic design

== Charts ==
Chart performance for False Alarm
Chart (2019)	Peak position
Australian Albums (ARIA)	62
Belgian Albums (Ultratop Flanders)	117
Belgian Albums (Ultratop Wallonia)	147
French Albums (SNEP)	128
German Albums (Offizielle Top 100)	73
Irish Albums (IRMA)	28
Irish Independent Albums (IRMA)	3
Japanese Albums (Oricon)	144
Scottish Albums (Official Charts)	2
Spanish Albums (Promusicae)	50
Swiss Albums (Schweizer Hitparade)	69
UK Albums (Official Charts)	5
US Independent Albums (Billboard)	11
US Top Album Sales (Billboard)	38
