= Eliot James =

British record producer

Eliot James is a British record producer, songwriter, musician, audio engineer and mixer, based at Eastcote Studios in West London, England.

Selected production credits include:

- Tor Miller "Midnight" EP
- Two Door Cinema Club Tourist History Album
- Kaiser Chiefs Off With Their Heads Album. Co-Produced with Mark Ronson,
- Noah and the Whale Peaceful, The World Lays Me Down Album
- The Coronas The Long Way LP
- Coasts (band) Coasts LP (various tracks)
- Puggy To Win The World LP
- Plan B "Everyday" Single
- The Futureheads "Area" Single
- "Does It Offend You, Yeah?" You Have No Idea What You're Getting Yourself Into Album
- Gabriella Cilmi's The Sting
- Bloc Party Silent Alarm (*additional production only : produced by Paul Epworth)
- Jamie N Commons The Baron EP
- Last Dinosaurs In A Million Years Album (mix only)
- Police Dog Hogan From the Land of Miracles Album

He was the recipient of the 2011 MPG Breakthrough Producer of The Year award.
