= Two Door Cinema Club =

Northern Irish rock band

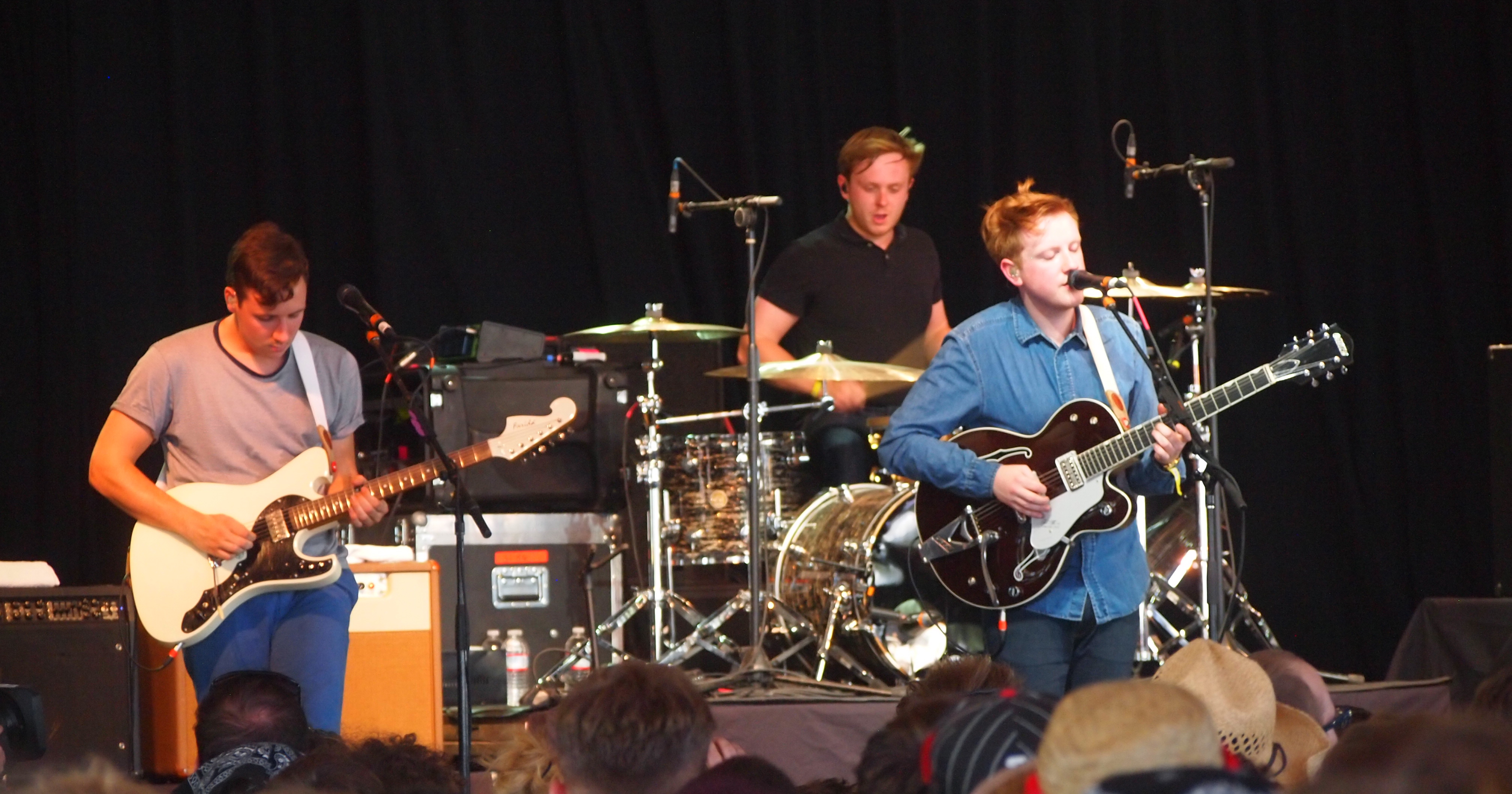
- Two Door Cinema Club performing at the 2012 Bonnaroo Music Festival. From left to right: Sam Halliday, touring drummer Benjamin Thompson, and Alex Trimble. Kevin Baird is out of frame.

Background information
- Origin: Bangor, County Down, Northern Ireland
- Genres: Indie pop; indie rock; dance-punk; synth-pop; post-punk revival
- Years active: 2007–present
- Labels: Kitsuné; Glassnote; Cooperative; Parlophone; Warner
- Members: Alex Trimble; Kevin Baird; Sam Halliday
- Website: twodoorcinemaclub.com

Two Door Cinema Club are a Northern Irish rock band formed in Bangor, County Down, in 2007. The band consists of Alex Trimble (vocals, rhythm guitar, beats, synths), Sam Halliday (lead guitar, backing vocals), and Kevin Baird (bass, synths, backing vocals).

The band's debut album, Tourist History, was released on 1 March 2010 by French independent record label Kitsuné Musique. In the United States, where the band are signed to Glassnote Records, the album was released on 27 April 2010. Tourist History was selected for the Choice Music Prize for Irish Album of the Year (2010) the following year.

The band's second album, Beacon, was released on 3 September 2012, debuted at number one on the Irish Albums Chart and reached number two in the UK Albums Chart.

The band's third album, Gameshow, was released on 14 October 2016. The first single, "Are We Ready? (Wreck)", was released on 14 June 2016 and was debuted on Annie Mac's Hottest Record on BBC Radio 1. Two more singles, "Bad Decisions" and the title track, "Gameshow", were released prior to the album and are also included on the track list.

Their fourth album, False Alarm, was released on 21 June 2019 and featured the singles "Satellite" and "Talk". In the following years, they have played regular slots at festivals such as Reading and Leeds Festival and Glastonbury.

Their fifth album, Keep On Smiling, was released on 2 September 2022 on Lower Third, their first album on an independent label. It featured the singles "Wonderful Life", "Lucky" and "Everybody's Cool".

== Formation ==
Trimble and Halliday first met while attending Bangor Grammar School; the pair later met Baird through mutual friends. The three first performed as a band at the age of 16 on ATL Rock School under the name Life Without Rory; the band finished in last place. Life Without Rory recorded some demos before disbanding; including "Safe in Silence" and "Conscripted By Choice" that are still on the band's inactive MySpace page. Another song, "You Missed the Point" exists in live version and can be viewed on YouTube.

After the demise of this first musical project, Trimble, Halliday and Baird decided to continue working together. In 2007, Two Door Cinema Club was established with the name inspired by Halliday's mispronunciation of the name of the local cinema, the Tudor Cinema. Following an increased interest in the band, the three members declined their university places and commenced work on studio material.

== History ==
=== Early releases and Four Words to Stand On (2007–2009) ===
An EP entitled Four Words to Stand On was released on 26 March 2008 and received attention on a number of websites. The EP was self-recorded and produced and was mixed and mastered by Ryan Mitchell. For the tenth anniversary of the EP, the band publicly released it in March 2018.

=== Tourist History (2009–2011) ===
In July 2009, Two Door Cinema Club began recording its debut album at Eastcote Studios in London, with Eliot James. In September 2009, the band began mixing the record with Phillipe Zdar at Motorbass, Zdar's studio in Paris.

In January 2010, Two Door Cinema Club announced the track listing and details of the band's debut album in an interview with NME. The album, entitled Tourist History, was released on 26 February 2010 in the Republic of Ireland, 1 March 2010 in the United Kingdom and 27 April 2010 in the U.S. The album was also preceded by the singles "Something Good Can Work", "I Can Talk".

On 18 January 2011, Two Door Cinema Club appeared on the American late night talk show, Late Night with Jimmy Fallon, performing the song, "What You Know", which later became their biggest hit of the record.

=== Beacon (2011–2013) ===
In April 2012, the band's official account revealed that a second album was near completion. On 20 June 2012, the band announced Beacon as the title of their second studio album, along with a release date of 3 September 2012 in the UK and 4 September elsewhere. Jacknife Lee, responsible for producing artists such as U2, R.E.M., Snow Patrol and Bloc Party, produced the album.

On 19 July 2012, "Sleep Alone" was selected as the lead single from Beacon and a "Sleep Alone" SoundCloud player was embedded on the NME site, allowing readers to listen to the single on 19 July 2012; however, the single was not officially released until 21 July. The accompanying music video for the single was uploaded to the band's YouTube channel on 8 August. "Sleep Alone" was also featured in the EA Sports game, FIFA 13.

In early October 2012, it was announced that the second single to be released from Beacon was to be "Sun"; which was released on 18 November. The video for "Sun" had made its debut on the band's YouTube channel on 11 October 2012.

Following the release of Beacon, the band released a four-part tour documentary entitled What We See. Filmed by Gregg Houston from Babysweet Sessions, a company that is friends with the band, the documentary accompanies the band members as they undertake a 2012 European summer tour prior to the release of the second album. Bassist Baird explained, in relation to the film: "Our good friends at Babysweet followed us around for a few weeks so our fans could get an idea of what life is really like for us on the road. Take a peek inside our average day."

Two Door Cinema Club announced in December 2012 that they were playing at the Scottish music festival, T in the Park 2013 in July 2013.

=== Changing of the Seasons EP (2013–2016) ===
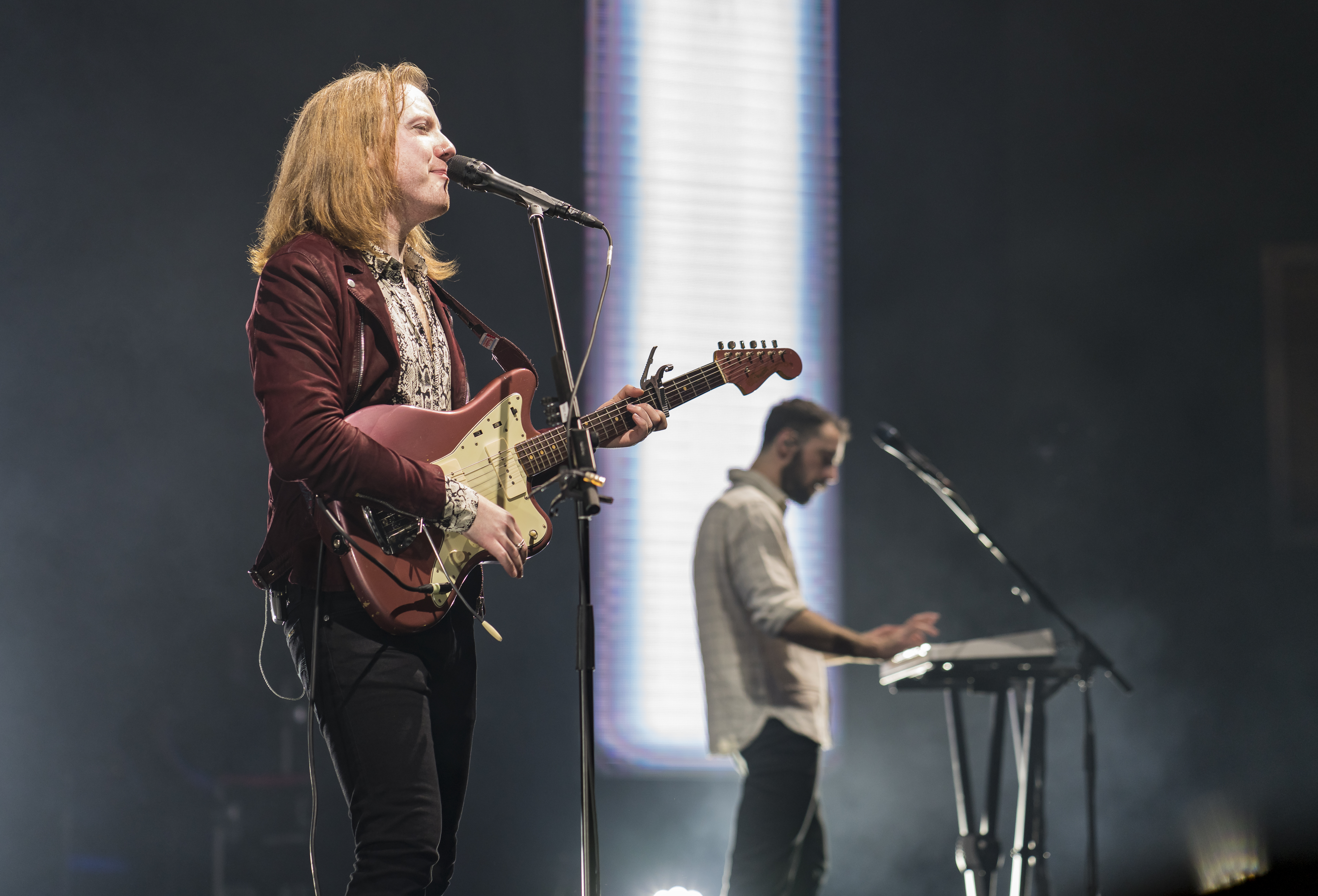
The band performing in Singapore in 2017

On 8 August 2013, the band announced that a new EP entitled Changing of the Seasons was to be released. Along with the news came a 30-second clip of the title track, which was set for release on 20 August and is the first single taken from the EP. On 15 August, BBC Radio 1 premiered the single. In an interview with the BBC on 18 July 2013, Trimble stated that the band had started work on its third studio album. He also mentioned that the band was aiming to release the album by early 2015. Trimble also announced that the band had left Kitsuné and signed with former EMI subsidiary Parlophone Records.

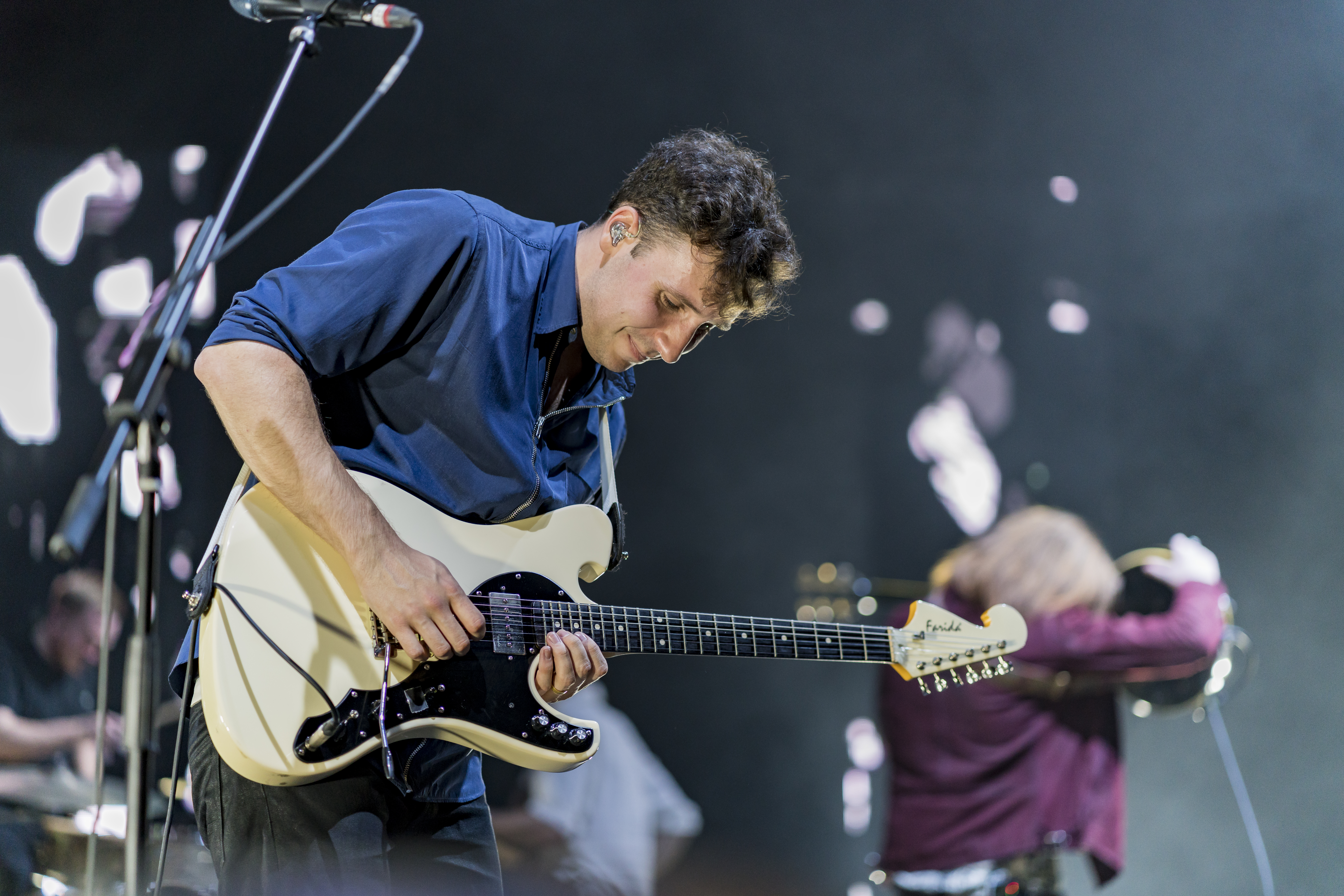
Halliday performing with the band in Singapore in 2017

=== Gameshow (2016–2019) ===
In January 2016, the band stated that new material, presumably its third album, would be released in 2016. On 4 April 2016, the band announced the completion of its third studio album, Gameshow, via Twitter after announcing previously that it would be at Glastonbury in the summer. Prior to the completion of the album, Two Door Cinema Club had played one of the songs named "Gameshow" from the album at a concert in Boston.

On 14 June 2016, the album artwork was revealed. On the same day, BBC Radio 1 debuted a new song from the album called "Are We Ready? (Wreck)". Prior to that, the band put the album up for pre-order. Two Door Cinema Club then released "Bad Decisions" as the second single off of the album, followed by the third and final single "Gameshow". On 6 July 2016, the band released a music video for "Are We Ready? (Wreck)", the song was also featured in the EA Sports game, FIFA 17. On 14 October 2016, the band released their third studio album, Gameshow.

=== False Alarm (2019) ===
In February 2019, the band released a teaser video on their social media, hinting to an upcoming release of a fourth album.

On 18 March 2019, Two Door Cinema Club released "Talk", their first single from the fourth album.

On 24 April 2019, the band released "Satellite" and announced the new album, False Alarm.

Over the course of two months the band released two more singles from the album titled "Dirty Air" and "Once" before releasing the album on 21 June 2019.

=== Keep On Smiling (2022) ===
During the band's May 2022 tour dates in Brazil, Two Door Cinema Club performed with unknown folk singer David Clements as the group's vocalist instead of Trimble. Trimble was not allowed to enter Brazil because he was unable to receive a COVID-19 vaccine for medical reasons.

On 16 June 2022, Two Door Cinema Club released the first single, "Wonderful Life" from their forthcoming fifth album, Keep On Smiling.

On 28 July, after using lottery scratcher-themed posts to reveal the date, "Lucky" was released as the second single.

The album was released digitally by Lower Third Records/Prolifica Inc. on 2 September 2022, with a limited edition run of 5,000 vinyl albums being released on 4 November 2022 (in association with PIAS in Europe and Glassnote in North America). As a protest to multi-format releases and album bundles, which has seen many indie acts such as The Wombats, Sea Power and Maximo Park drop out of the top 5 of the UK Albums Chart in their second week of release, the band decided to destroy their latest album's masters in a furnace, so it could never be issued on CD or re-issued in the future.

In September 2023, the group released a new single, "Sure Enough".

In March 2024, the group released another new single, "Happy Customers". Alongside the release, the band confirmed that the recent singles aren't currently a part of a larger album, as the format of album "feels very dated" according to Halliday.

The band performing in Adelaide (November 2026)

== Other projects ==
In July 2012, Trimble participated in the 2012 Summer Olympics opening ceremony, singing "Caliban's Dream", a song written by Underworld's Rick Smith. Trimble revealed in an interview that filmmaker Danny Boyle, who had been commissioned as the event's "ceremony chief", had selected the singer for the role to sing at the ceremony.

Alex Trimble has also worked with Anteros on the making of their debut album as the second producer.

In December 2023, Trimble co-wrote Ariel Pink's song "Rudolph's Laptop", about the Hunter Biden laptop controversy, with Pink and ex-Mumford & Sons guitarist/banjoist Winston Marshall.

== Members ==
- Alex Trimble – lead vocals, rhythm guitar, keyboards, synthesizers, piano, drums, percussion
- Sam Halliday – lead guitar, synthesizers, backing vocals
- Kevin Baird – bass guitar, synthesizers, keyboards, backing vocals

=== Current touring musicians ===
- Benjamin Thompson – drums (2010–present)
- Andrew Lindsay – keyboards, rhythm guitar, saxophone (2024–present)

=== Former touring musicians ===
- Jacob Berry – rhythm guitar, synthesizers, keyboards, backing vocals (2016–2023)

== Discography ==
- Tourist History (2010)
- Beacon (2012)
- Gameshow (2016)
- False Alarm (2019)
- Keep On Smiling (2022)

== Awards ==
In December 2009, Two Door Cinema Club was featured in the BBC's Sound of... 2010 – a poll compiled by 165 British "tastemakers".

Tourist History was announced as the winner of the Choice Music Prize for Irish Album of the Year 2010 at Vicar Street on 3 March 2011; the band revealed that the award was its first. They donated the prize money to Abaana, a Northern Ireland-based charity from their hometown. Two Door Cinema Club also won the Breaking Woodie from mtvU.

In the 2010 Triple J Hottest 100, "Undercover Martyn" came in at number 21 and "I Can Talk" was at number 72. In the 2012 Triple J Hottest 100,"Sun" came in at number 37 and "Sleep Alone" was at number 90. In the 2013 Triple J Hottest 100, "Changing of the Seasons" came in at number 71.

Two Door Cinema Club has received several nominations for NME awards. In 2011, they were nominated the best new band, and their debut album Tourist History was nominated for best album. In 2012, they were nominated for the best live band. In 2014, they were nominated for the best British band.

== Tours ==
In the live performance arena, Two Door Cinema Club has opened for other musical acts, such as autoKratz, Delphic, Foals, Phoenix and Metronomy. They opened for Phoenix during the band's 2010 U.S. tour.

Following the release of Tourist History, the band toured the UK and Ireland in March 2010. The band also played at several May Balls at the University of Cambridge in June 2010, including the Christ's College and Jesus College balls.

The band performed at numerous festivals in 2010, including the iTunes Festival, the Red Bull Bedroom Jam Futures Stage at T in the Park, the NME Stage at Reading Festival and Leeds Festival, the main stage at Oxegen, Southside Festival, Hurricane Festival, the Benicassim festival, the Splendour in the Grass Australian festival and the Electric Picnic festival in Ireland. A 2010 eastern tour involved the band performing in Australia, Japan, Korea, Indonesia, Singapore and Hong Kong.

On 13 January 2011, Two Door Cinema Club commenced a 2-week co-headlining tour of the U.S. and Canada with Canadians Tokyo Police Club; support came from bands such as Work Drugs and Someone Still Loves You Boris Yeltsin.

Following a 2010 announcement, Two Door Cinema Club performed at the Orange Evolution Festival in 2011. The band played at numerous other festivals including the Glastonbury Festival, the Coachella Valley Music and Arts Festival, the Isle of Wight Festival, Oxegen, the Parklife Festival, Lollapalooza, the Reading and Leeds Festivals, the Paredes de Coura in Portugal, the Open'er Festival and the Virgin Mobile FreeFest in Columbia, Maryland.

Following the summer festival season of 2011, the band toured again in the U.S. for three weeks and then worked on the second album in a home studio in Glasgow. The band then toured again in America in November and December 2011, before continuing onto the festival season.

In March 2012 the band appeared on tour in South Africa, playing at a promotional concert for 5 chewing gum brand. They performed in two shows, one in Johannesburg and the other in Cape Town, both being supported by local acts.

Two Door Cinema Club completed two American tours in May and June 2012 and September 2012 and October 2012, while also headlining the 2012 NME Awards Tour at the start of the year and a brief UK/Irish tour in September 2012.

In addition to Portugal's SW TMN Festival, the band performed at the 2012 Reading and Leeds Festivals, Bestival on the Isle of Wight, the Bonnaroo Music and Arts Festival in Tennessee, and the A Perfect Day Festival in Verona.

Two Door Cinema Club embarked on a full UK & Ireland tour in 2013 that started in Belfast on 18 January, included a sellout show at Dublin's O2 Arena, and finished at London's Brixton Academy on 8 February; the band were supported by Bastille and Swim Deep. The band then commenced a three-week European tour in Zurich, Switzerland, with support from Dog Is Dead and The 1975, followed by their biggest ever London show at Alexandra Palace on 27 April. As of May 2013, four summer festivals are confirmed for 2013: Scotland's T in the Park, England's Virgin Media V Festival, Portugal's NOS Alive and their fourth appearance at Glastonbury. Two Door Cinema Club has also been mentioned within a list of supposedly fake band names in Jimmy Kimmel's Lie Witness News interviews at Coachella. and Colombia's Estéreo Picnic.

They were announced as being part of the line up at the Splendour in the Grass Music Festival at North Byron Parklands, in New South Wales, Australia. The Music Festival ran for three days starting from 21 July 2017. On 7 April 2017 they also announced playing sideshows in Melbourne, Sydney and Perth, starting 19 July 2017, with tickets on sale on 11 April 2017.

A European tour and North American tour were scheduled in 2022 but the band cancelled both while the band's bassist and synth player, Kevin Baird, dealt with health issues. Baird had previously announced that he had an "incurable autoimmune disease". He later announced that he was scheduled to have an operation in early October 2022.

== In popular culture ==
=== Film and television ===
- "Something Good Can Work" and "Do You Want It All" were used in the 2011 film Chalet Girl.
- "This is the Life" was featured in the 2011 film Soul Surfer.
- "Do You Want It All?" was featured in an episode of Teen Wolf.
- "What You Know" was featured in an episode of Dynamo: Magician Impossible.
- "What You Know", "Something Good Can Work" and "Settle" were used in the 2012 sitcom Pramface.
- Jesse Marco's remix of "Sun" was used in the 2013 film Now You See Me.
- "Bad Decisions" was used in the 2016 film The Edge of Seventeen.
- "Something Good Can Work" appeared in The Inbetweeners, season 3, episode 5.
- The instrumental of "What You Know" was used in Extra Gear, season 1, episode 1.
- "Bad Decisions" and "What You Know" appeared in My Kitchen Rules, season 8, episode 10.
- "What You Know" was featured in The Vampire Diaries, season 3, episode 1.
- "You're Not Stubborn" was featured in Grey's Anatomy, season 6, episode 19.
- "Come Back Home" and "I Can Talk" featured in The Russell Howard Hour, season 1, episode 1.
- "What You Know" was used as the backing track for the weather section of the Chilean Newscast Ahora Noticias (later renamed Meganoticias Alerta) from early 2015 to early 2020.
- "Something Good Can Work" featured in Series 7, episode 2 of Mortimer and Whitehouse: Gone Fishing screened in September 2024.

=== Commercial ===
- "Something Good Can Work" and "Undercover Martyn" featured on television advertisements for Vodafone and Meteor.
- "Sleep Alone" and "Next Year" were featured on the playlist of the clothing retailer Hollister Co. during the autumn season of 2012.
- "This Is The Life" was featured on a television commercial for Debenhams, in which designers Henry Holland, Jasper Conran and Julien Macdonald displayed their new season range for Autumn 2012. The song had been used in previous Debenhams advertisements.
- "Something Good Can Work" featured on television advertisements for Fat Face. In 2021, it featured in Northern Ireland Executive television and radio advertisements about remaining responsible after the lifting of coronavirus restrictions.

=== Video games ===
- "Undercover Martyn" was featured on the soundtrack of Gran Turismo 5.
- On 25 November 2010, the track "What You Know" was released as a free download on Tap Tap Revenge 3, and has also appeared in Tap Tap Revenge and Tap Tap Revenge 4. This song was also covered in EA’s College Football 2026.
- The song "I Can Talk" appears as soundtrack on EA Sports game, FIFA 11
- The song "Sleep Alone" appears as soundtrack on EA Sports game, FIFA 13.
- The Twelves remix of "Something Good Can Work" were featured in SSX and Forza Horizon.
- "Are We Ready? (Wreck)" is featured on the soundtrack of FIFA 17.
