= Jacknife Lee =

Irish music producer

- Also known as: Jack Planck
- Born: Garret Lee
- Origin: Dublin, Ireland
- Genres: Rock, electronica
- Occupations: Musician, producer, mixer
- Instruments: Guitar, keyboards, percussion
- Labels: Pussyfoot; Palm Pictures; One Little Indian; PIAS
- Formerly of: Compulsion
- Website: jacknifelee.com

Garret "Jacknife" Lee is an Irish music producer and mixer. He has worked with a variety of artists, including the Cars, U2, R.E.M., the Killers, Robbie Williams, Snow Patrol, Bloc Party, Two Door Cinema Club, AFI, the Hives, Weezer, One Direction, Silversun Pickups, Editors, Modest Mouse, Lonnie Holley and Taylor Swift.

== Biography ==
Lee started as a guitarist for the Dublin garage/punk band Compulsion, formerly Thee Amazing Colossal Men, then pursued a solo career in the field of electronica after the band's break-up. His first solo work, the EP A Dog Named Snuggles, was released under the name "Jacknife" in 1998 by Pussyfoot Records, a label founded by Howie B. By the next release, the name had been expanded to "Jacknife Lee".

Lee released his first album, Muy Rico, in 1998. His second album Punk Rock High Roller was released in 2001 by Palm Pictures. To Hell With You I'll Make My Own People was recorded as Jack Planck for the One Little Indian label. Jacknife Lee released his self-titled third solo album in 2007.

Jacknife Lee has also remixed a variety of artists' work including a version of Run-DMC's "It's Tricky 2003", the Future Sound of London's "The Mello Hippo Disco Show" and versions of U2's "Vertigo" which was limited released onto 7", 10" and 12" vinyl, Christina Aguilera, TLC, Pink, Blur, Radiohead, Missy Elliott, Busta Rhymes, Eminem, the Raveonettes, Kraftwerk, New Order and Kasabian. In 2008, he produced R.E.M.'s Accelerate, Bloc Party's Intimacy, Two Door Cinema Club and Crystal Castles. In 2010 he produced R.E.M.'s last album Collapse into Now, released in 2011.

Lee supported Bono's "Stories of Surrender" theater tour in 2022 and 2023 as musical director, keyboardist and percussionist.

On 24 July 2023, Lee, Lol Tolhurst and Budgie announced their album Los Angeles, released on 3 November by PIAS Recordings.

== Works produced, mixed, or written ==
- Sack – Butterfly Effect (1997)
- 28 Days Later OST Enhanced – Ave Maria (2003)
- Snow Patrol – Final Straw (2003)
- Aqualung – Still Life (2004)
- Kasabian – Reason Is Treason (2004)
- U2 – How to Dismantle an Atomic Bomb (2004)
- Vega4 – You and Others (2006)
- Vaux – Beyond Virtue, Beyond Vice (2006)
- The Freelance Hellraiser – Waiting for Clearance (2006)
- Snow Patrol – Eyes Open (2006)
- Bono, The Edge, Andrea Corr and T-Bone Burnett – Don't Come Knocking (2005)
- Juliet – Ride the Pain (2005)
- Editors – "Bullets" (2006)
- Bloc Party – A Weekend in the City (2007)
- Editors – An End Has a Start (2007)
- Green Day & U2 – "The Saints Are Coming" (2007)
- Snow Patrol – "Signal Fire" (2007)
- Nicole Scherzinger – Just Say Yes (2007)
- The Hives – The Black and White Album (2007)
- PlayRadioPlay! – Texas (2008)
- R.E.M. – Accelerate (2008)
- Hadouken! – Music for an Accelerated Culture (2008)
- Weezer – The Red Album (2008)
- Bloc Party – Intimacy (2008)
- Snow Patrol – A Hundred Million Suns (2008)
- Marmaduke Duke – Duke Pandemonium (2009)
- Bloc Party – "One More Chance" (2009)
- Amanda Blank – Shame on Me (2009)
- Weezer – Raditude (2009)
- U2 – Medium, Rare & Remastered (2009)
- Regina Spektor – Far (2009)
- AFI – Crash Love (2009)
- R.E.M. – Live at the Olympia (2009)
- Snow Patrol – Up to Now (2009)
- Crystal Castles – Crystal Castles (2010)
- Tired Pony – The Place We Ran From (2010)
- Mêlée – The Masquerade (2010)
- Biffy Clyro – Many of Horror (2010)
- Snow Patrol – "Just Say Yes" (2010)
- Blur : Video Game – Blur : Video Game (2010)
- R.E.M. – Collapse Into Now (2011)
- Crystal Castles – "Not in Love" (feat. Robert Smith) (2011)
- The Walkmen – Juveniles (2011)
- The Cars – Move Like This (2011)
- The Wombats – This Modern Glitch (2011)
- The Black Keys – "Tighten Up (Radio Mix)" (2011)
- All Time Low – Dirty Work (2011)
- The Drums – Portamento (2011)
- Snow Patrol – Fallen Empires (2011)
- R.E.M. – Part Lies, Part Heart, Part Truth, Part Garbage 1982–2011 (2011)
- LostAlone – I'm a UFO in This City (2012)
- Silversun Pickups – Neck of the Woods (2012)
- Two Door Cinema Club – Beacon (2012)
- Robbie Williams – Take the Crown (2012)
- Taylor Swift – Red (2012)
- Crystal Castles – III (2012)
- Snow Patrol – Greatest Hits (2013)
- Tired Pony – The Ghost of the Mountain (2013)
- Lissie – Back to Forever (2013)
- Bonnie McKee – "American Girl" (2013)
- One Direction – Something Great (2013)
- Silversun Pickups – Let It Decay (2013)
- Silversun Pickups – The Singles Collection (2014)
- Twin Atlantic – Great Divide (2014)
- Snow Patrol – Divergent: Original Motion Picture Soundtrack (2014)
- Neil Diamond – Melody Road (2014)
- Kodaline – Coming Up for Air (2015)
- Elle King – Love Stuff (2015)
- Saint Raymond – Young Blood (2015)
- Silversun Pickups – Better Nature (2015)
- Yacht – I Thought the Future Would Be Cooler (2015)
- Raury – All We Need (2015)
- Jake Bugg – On My One (2016)
- Bat for Lashes – The Bride (2016)
- Twin Atlantic – GLA (2016)
- Two Door Cinema Club – Gameshow (2016)
- Neil Diamond – Acoustic Christmas (2016)
- Michelle Branch – Hopeless Romantic (2017)
- Beth Ditto – Fake Sugar (2017)
- The Killers – Wonderful Wonderful (2017)
- Alex Cameron – Forced Witness (2017)
- U2 – Songs of Experience (2017)
- The Beaches –Late Show (2017)
- Snow Patrol – Wildness (2018)
- The Killers – Revamp: Reimagining the Songs of Elton John & Bernie Taupin (2018)
- Bob Moses – Battle Lines (2018)
- Sneaks – Hong Kong To Amsterdam (2018)
- Jacknife Lee – Space Is The Plaice / Pussyfoot (2018)
- The Killers – "Land of the Free" (2019)
- Sneaks – Highway Hypnosis (2019)
- Catfish and The Bottlemen - The Balance (2019)
- The Beaches – The Professional (2019)
- Editors – Frankenstein (2019)
- Two Door Cinema Club – False Alarm (2019)
- Editors – Black Gold (2019)
- Snow Patrol – Reworked (2019)
- Jacknife Lee – The Jacknife Lee (2020)
- Jack Garratt – Love, Death and Dancing (2020)
- The Freelance Hellraiser – Waiting For Clearance (2020)
- Sneaks – Happy Birthday (2020)
- Open Mike Eagle – Anime, Trauma and Divorce (2020)
- Elderbrook – Why Do We Shake in the Cold? (2020)
- A Certain Ratio – Yo Yo Grip (2020)
- James - All the Colours of You (2021)
- The Beaches – Future Lovers (2021)
- Modest Mouse - The Golden Casket (2021)
- A Certain Ratio – ACR/EPC (2021)
- Taylor Swift – Red (Taylor's Version) (2021)
- U2 – Sing 2 Soundtrack (2021)
- Twin Atlantic – Bang On The Gong (2021)
- Twin Atlantic – One Man Party (2021)
- Twin Atlantic – Get Famous (2021)
- Twin Atlantic – Transparency (2022)
- The Wombats – Fix Yourself, Not the World (2022)
- Two Door Cinema Club – Keep On Smiling (2022)
- Tears for Fears – The Tipping Point (2022)
- Sea Girls – Homesick (2022)
- The Regrettes – Further Joy (2022)
- Rokia Kone – Bamanan (2022)
- Telefís – aHaon (2022)
- Telefís – a Dó (2022)
- Telefís – Special Report (2023)
- Lonnie Holley – Oh Me Oh My (2023)
- U2 – "Atomic City" (2023)
- Alex Lahey – The Answer Is Always Yes (2023)
- U2 – Carnaval De Luz (2026)

=== Remixes ===
- U2 – "The Blackout"
- U2 – "Bullet the Blue Sky"
- Basement Jaxx – "Where's Your Head At"
- Editors – An End Has a Start
- U2 – "Window in the Skies"
- U2 – "Fast Cars"
- U2 – "Vertigo"
- U2 & Pavarotti – "Ave Maria"
- New Order – "Waiting for the Sirens' Call"
- Elkland – "Apart"
- Spektrum – Kinda New
- The Raveonettes – That Great Love Sound
- Busta Rhymes – "Put Your Hands"
- Run-DMC – "It's Tricky"
- Eminem – "Cleanin' Out My Closet"
- Missy Elliott – "Get Ur Freak On"
- Radiohead – "Airbag"
- Kraftwerk – Airwaves
- Christina Aguilera – "Can't Hold Us Down"
- Pink – "Just Like a Pill"
- TLC – "Girl Talk"
- Blur and Marianne Faithfull – Kissin Time
- The Future Sound of London – "The Mello Hippo Disco Show"
- Dirty Vegas – Simple Things
- Snow Patrol – "Run"
- Snow Patrol – "You're All I Have"
- Badly Drawn Boy – Born Again
- Longview – Further
- Aqualung – Good Time Is Gonna Come
- Aqualung – Strange and Beautiful
- Buck 65 – Wicked and Weird
- Kosheen – Wasting My Time
- Björk – "I Miss You"
- Tom Jones – "Black Betty"
- Fuzz Townsend – Bus
- The Beatles – "Eleanor Rigby"
- Elvis Presley – "Burning Love"
- Télépopmusik – Do tha Hoola
- LHB featuring Justin Warfield – No Transmission
- Kasabian – "Reason Is Treason"
- U2 – "The Blackout"
- Fenech-Soler – "Night Time TV"
- R.E.M. – "Radio Free Europe"
