= Maison Kitsuné =

French-Japanese fashion and record label

The Kitsuné Company S.A.S

- Maison Kitsuné in Greenbelt, Makati, Philippines.
- Trade name: Maison Kitsuné
- Type: Private (S.A.S)
- Industry: Fashion; Music; Café
- Founded: 2002; 24 years ago in Paris, France
- Founder: Masaya Kuroki; Gildas Loaëc
- Headquarters: 9, rue du Helder, Paris, France
- Number of locations: 35 boutiques (2022)
- Area served: Worldwide
- Key people: Gildas Loaëc (CEO)
- Products: Clothing; fashion accessories; footwear
- Website: maisonkitsune.com

The Kitsuné France Company SAS, doing business as Maison Kitsuné (French pronunciation: [mezɔ̃ kitsune]) is a luxury French lifestyle brand founded in 2002 by Gildas Loaëc and Masaya Kuroki. Kitsuné operates as a premium fashion brand, a record label, an art gallery, and a chain of cafés and restaurants worldwide.

The name Kitsuné comes from the Japanese word kitsune (hiragana: きつね; kanji: 狐) meaning "fox". In Japan, the fox is said to have the power to change its appearance and its face; the many faces and appearances of the fox represent the different parts and directions of Kitsuné. The fox is featured prominently in their ready-to-wear collections. Kitsuné Musique and Café Kitsuné are the sub-brands of their record label and chain of coffee shops, respectively.

== History ==
Maison Kitsuné was founded in 2002 as a record label by Gildas Loaëc and Masaya Kuroki in Paris. The founders first met in Loaëc's record shop in Paris where house music lovers, including Kuroki, Daft Punk, and others, frequented. After a trip to Japan for a music video together, they came up with the idea of launching a lifestyle brand not confined to one discipline. The result was Maison Kitsuné, which blends music and fashion as a multi-faceted Paris-meets-Tokyo brand. The pair promoted the brand by performing DJ sets, which was followed by the release of the first t-shirt, shirt, dress, and eventually a full-fledged ready-to-wear collection in 2005 that represents 90 percent of its revenue today.

In 2013, Maison Kitsuné expanded their brand by opening a coffee shop called Café Kitsuné in Tokyo, Japan. The first café-restaurant opened in Paris, France in 2019. They have since expanded Café Kitsuné to 26 locations worldwide, including in Tokyo, Paris, New York City, London, Vancouver, and Shanghai.

Starting in 2025, Maison Kitsuné is closing its US retail stores to refocus on e-commerce and wholesale distribution.

== Kitsuné Musique ==
Kitsuné Musique
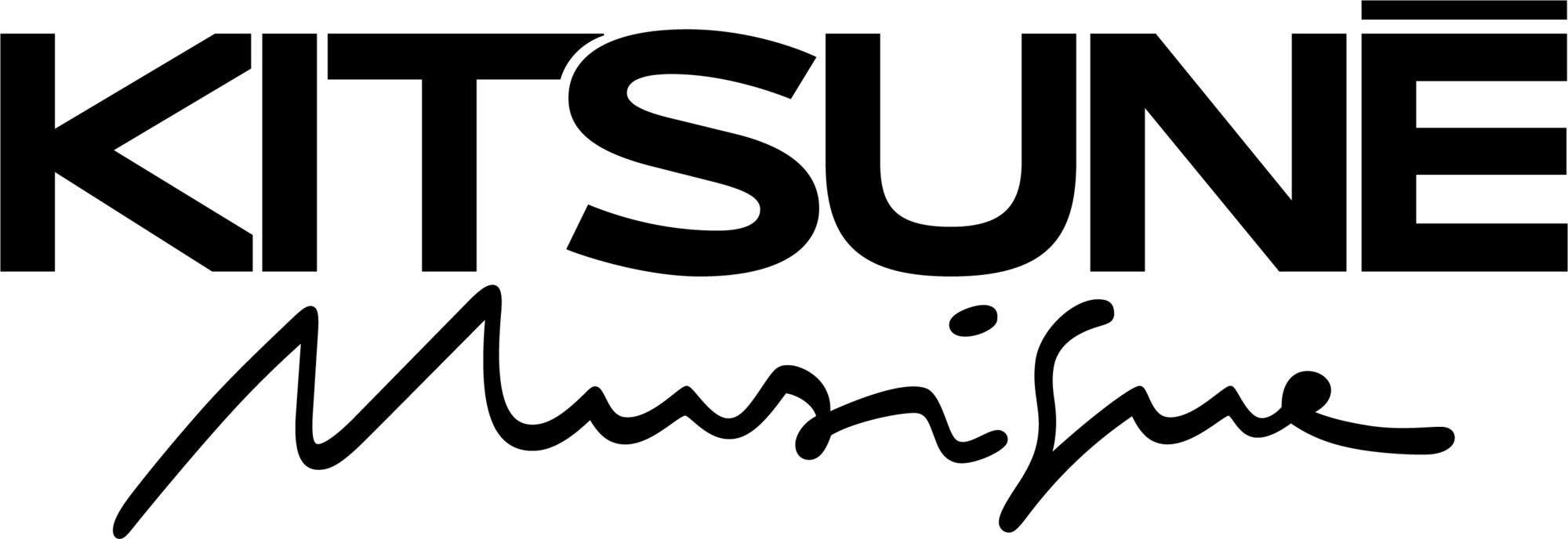
- Founded: 2002; 24 years ago in Paris, France
- Founder: Masaya Kuroki; Gildas Loaëc
- Distributors: Interscope Geffen A&M (US); Polydor Records (UK); Universal Music Group (Worldwide)
- Genre: Electronic; Indie rock
- Country of origin: France; Japan
- Location: Paris, France
- Official website: Official website

=== Artists ===
- Adam Sky
- Alan Braxe & Fred Falke
- Allen French
- Appaloosa
- autoKratz
- Beau
- Beni
- Big Face
- Bitchee Bitchee Ya Ya Ya
- Black Strobe
- Bloc Party
- Boys Noize
- Buscabulla
- Carter Reeves
- Cazals
- Chew Lips
- Chong the Nomad
- Citizens!
- Claire George
- Classixx
- Crystal Fighters
- Cut Copy
- David E. Sugar
- Delia Dane
- Delphic
- Digitalism
- DJ Gregory
- Dombrance
- Dot
- Fischerspooner
- Giraffage
- Guns 'n' Bombs
- Hadouken!
- Haiva Ru
- HeartsRevolution
- Housse de Racket
- Is Tropical
- Joe and Will Ask?
- Josh Dives
- Khazali
- Kilo Kish
- Klaxons
- Kowloon
- Kydd Jones
- La Roux
- LD Donovan
- Le Corps Mince de Françoise
- Les Gordon
- Lifelike
- Life on Planets
- Localblac
- Lomeli
- Luc de la Croixx
- Manast LL'
- Mark Ronson
- Matveï
- Mija
- Milwin
- MnkyBsnss
- Monterosso
- Moonlight Matters
- Mothxr
- Moullinex
- MyNameIsLeonidas
- Napkey
- Parcels
- Pat Lok
- Phoenix
- Pink Skies
- Pyramid
- Real Bad Man
- Savi Minds
- Solå
- Tasha the Amazon
- Taylor Bense
- The Undercover Dream Lovers
- Tim Ayre
- Tkay Maidza
- Two Door Cinema Club
- XXX
- Years & Years
- Yelle
- You Love Her
