= The Libertines discography =

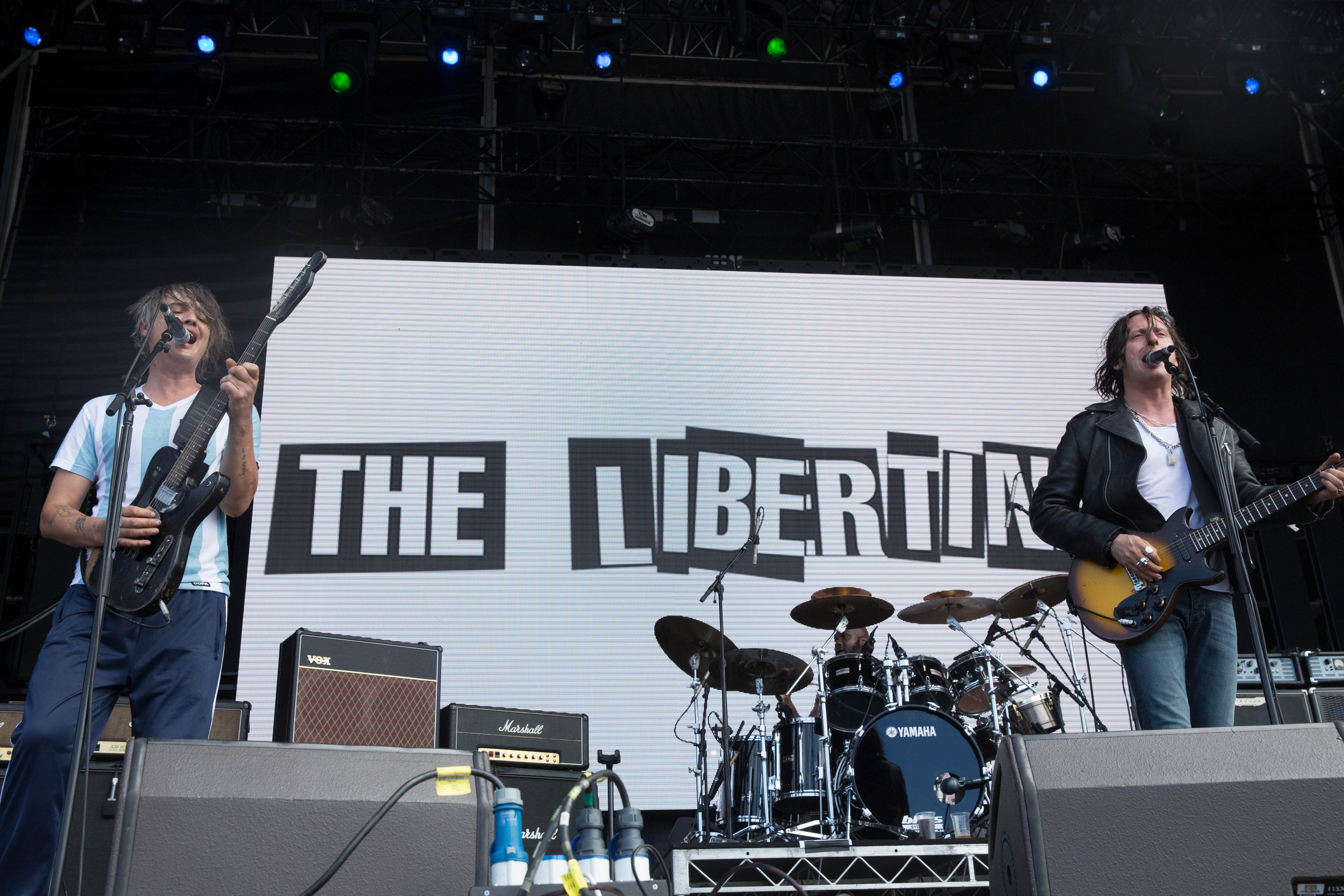
- The Libertines performing in 2018
- Studio albums: 4
- Extended plays: 4
- Live albums: 1
- Compilation albums: 1
- Singles: 12
- Music videos: 6

English rock band The Libertines have released four studio albums, four extended plays (EPs), one compilation album, 11 singles and six music videos. Formed in 1997, the Libertines consisted of Pete Doherty (vocals/rhythm guitar), Carl Barât (vocals/lead guitar), John Hassall (bass) and Gary Powell (drums).

The Libertines released their first single "What a Waster" in June 2002 through Rough Trade Records. The single broke into the UK top 40, and earned the band acclaim from the British music press. The Libertines followed up with their debut full-length album Up the Bracket in October 2002. Although Up the Bracket only peaked at number thirty-five in the UK, it was critically acclaimed, and rated as one of the year's best by many publications. Two singles were released to support the album; "Up the Bracket", which reached number twenty-nine in the UK, and "Time for Heroes", which peaked at the twentieth spot.

In August 2003, the Libertines released their fourth single, "Don't Look Back into the Sun". It was their highest-charting effort so far, reaching number eleven. The band's self-titled second album The Libertines was released a year later in August 2004. The album debuted at the top of the British charts, helped by lead single "Can't Stand Me Now", which hit number two. The Libertines, which was certified platinum in the UK, saw the band chart in the United States for the first time, peaking at number 111 on the Billboard 200. In 2007, Rough Trade issued a greatest hits compilation, Time for Heroes – The Best of The Libertines, which reached number twenty-three in the UK.

== Albums ==
=== Studio albums ===
Title	Details	Peak chart positions										Certifications (sales thresholds)
Title	Details	UK	AUS	BEL	FRA	GER	IRE	NLD	SWE	SWI	US	Certifications (sales thresholds)
Up the Bracket	Released: 14 October 2002; Label: Rough Trade (#065); Formats: CD, vinyl, CD/DVD (re-release)	35	—	—	120	—	—	—	59	—	— (Note: Up the Bracket did not enter the US Billboard 200, but peaked at number 13 on the US Heatseekers Albums Chart.)	BPI: Platinum
The Libertines	Released: 30 August 2004; Label: Rough Trade (#166); Formats: CD, vinyl, gatefold vinyl, CD/DVD (re-issue)	1	53	24	27	20	5	53	18	51	111	BPI: Platinum
Anthems for Doomed Youth	Released: 11 September 2015; Label: Virgin EMI; Formats: CD, vinyl, digital	3	55	16	22	9	10	28	13	11	— (Note: Anthems for Doomed Youth did not enter the US Billboard 200, but peaked at number 99 on the Current Album Sales Chart.)	BPI: Silver
All Quiet on the Eastern Esplanade	Released: 5 April 2024; Label: Virgin EMI; Formats: CD, vinyl, digital	1	—	40	21	7	51	—	— (Note: All Quiet on the Eastern Esplanade did not enter the Sverigetopplistan Albums chart but peaked at number five on the Sverigetopplistan Physical Albums chart.)	8	—	
"—" denotes albums that did not chart.

=== Compilation albums ===
Title	Details	Peak chart positions					Certifications (sales thresholds)
Title	Details	UK	UK Indie	IRE	JPN	SCO	Certifications (sales thresholds)
Time for Heroes – The Best of The Libertines	Released: 29 October 2007; Label: Rough Trade (#421); Formats: CD, vinyl	23	2	62	155	18	BPI: Gold

=== Live albums ===
Title	Details
Live at O2 Academy Glasgow, 2015	Released: 16 April 2016; Label: Let Them Eat Vinyl, Concert Live; Formats: CD, vinyl, digital

== Extended plays ==
Title	Details	Peak chart positions
Title	Details	UK
Time for Heroes	Released: March 2003 (Japan only); Label: Toshiba EMI; Format: Maxi CD	—
I Get Along	Released: August 2003 (US only); Label: Sanctuary; Formats: CD, vinyl	99
Don't Look Back into the Sun / Death on the Stairs	Released: October 2003 (Japan only); Label: Rough Trade Japan; Format: Maxi CD	—
What Became of the Likely Lads	Released: March 2005 (US only); Label: Rough Trade US; Format: Maxi CD	—

== Singles ==
Title	Year	Peak chart positions										Certifications	Album
Title	Year	UK	UK Indie	BEL (FL) Tip	CZ Rock	EU	IRE	MEX Air.	POL	SCO	US Sales	Certifications	Album
"What a Waster"	2002	37	2	—	—	—	—	—	—	41	—		Non-album single
"Up the Bracket"	2002	29	4	—	—	—	—	—	—	37	—		Up the Bracket
"Time for Heroes"	2003	20	6	—	—	—	—	—	—	30	—	BPI: Silver	Up the Bracket
"Don't Look Back into the Sun"	2003	11	1	—	—	—	—	—	—	14	—	BPI: Platinum	Non-album single
"Can't Stand Me Now"	2004	2	1	—	—	7	28	—	34	2	39	BPI: Platinum	The Libertines
"What Became of the Likely Lads"	2004	9	1	—	—	—	—	—	—	9	—		The Libertines
"Gunga Din"	2015	101	—	39	12	—	—	38	—	89	—		Anthems For Doomed Youth
"Glasgow Coma Scale Blues"	2015	—	—	—	—	—	—	—	—	—	—		Anthems For Doomed Youth
"Heart of the Matter"	2015	—	—	—	—	—	—	—	—	—	—		Anthems For Doomed Youth
"You're My Waterloo"	2015	—	—	— (Note: "You're My Waterloo" did not enter the Flanders Ultratop 50, but entered the Ultratop "Extra Tips".)	—	—	—	—	—	—	—		Anthems For Doomed Youth
"Run Run Run"	2023	— (Note: "Run Run Run" did not enter the UK Singles Chart, but peaked at number 95 on the UK Singles Sales Chart Top 100.)	—	—	—	—	—	—	—	—	—		All Quiet on the Eastern Esplanade
"Night of the Hunter"	2023	—	—	—	—	—	—	—	—	—	—		All Quiet on the Eastern Esplanade
"Merry Old England"	—	—	—	—	—	—	—	—	—	—			All Quiet on the Eastern Esplanade
"—" denotes singles that did not chart.

== Music videos ==
Year	Title	Director
2002	"Up the Bracket"	Gina Birch
2003	"Don't Look Back into the Sun"	Alexander Strickland-Clarke
2003	"Time for Heroes"	Gina Birch
2003	"I Get Along"	Gina Birch
2004	"Can't Stand Me Now"	Douglas Hart and Becky Hastings
2004	"What Became of the Likely Lads"	Johan Renck
2015	"Gunga Din"	Roger Sargent
2015	"Heart of the Matter"	Roger Sargent
2015	"You're My Waterloo"	Roger Sargent and Carl Barât

== Miscellaneous ==
Year	Song	Album	Comments
2003	"Lazy Sunday"	Blackball soundtrack	Cover of a 1968 Small Faces song.
2004	"Born in England"	Single	Xfm's song for the Euro 2004 football tournament. Also features James Nesbitt, Delays, Bernard Butler, The Wheatleys, and members of Supergrass.
2004	"All at Sea"	The Observer newspaper free CD	Previously unreleased song. The other songs on the CD were "Can't Stand Me Now", "Don't Look Back into the Sun", "Time for Heroes" and "Narcissist".
2004	"Up the Bracket (live)"	Bring Your Own Poison – the Rhythm Factory Sessions	"Another Girl, Another Planet" is a hidden track performed along with Peter Perrett.
2004	"Another Girl, Another Planet"	Bring Your Own Poison – the Rhythm Factory Sessions	"Another Girl, Another Planet" is a hidden track performed along with Peter Perrett.
