= Time for Heroes – The Best of The Libertines =

Greatest hits album by The Libertines
- Released: 29 October 2007
- Genre: Garage rock revival
- Length: 39:18
- Label: Rough Trade
- Producer: Mick Jones, Bernard Butler

The Libertines chronology
The Libertines (2004)	Time for Heroes – The Best of The Libertines (2007)	Anthems for Doomed Youth (2015)

Professional ratings
Review scores
Source	Rating
Allmusic	4/5 stars
Digital Spy	3/5 stars
Filter	75%
NME	7/10
Pitchfork Media	5.9/10

Time for Heroes – The Best of The Libertines is the greatest hits collection by English rock band The Libertines, released in October 2007 on Rough Trade Records.

== Overview ==
The album is the first material to be released by the group, who split up following a deterioration in the relationship between Pete Doherty and the other members of the band, since the single "What Became of the Likely Lads" in October 2004.

The album contains no previously unreleased material, except for the iTunes edition. However, it includes non-album singles ("What a Waster" and "Don't Look Back into the Sun") and several b-sides ("Mayday", "The Delaney" and a rerecording of "Death on the Stairs") some of which were released as bonus tracks on various editions of the band's albums. The compilation itself had no input from the band.

== Track listing ==
All songs written by Pete Doherty and Carl Barât except where noted.

No.	Title	Writer(s)	Length
1.	"Up the Bracket" (from Up the Bracket)		2:40
2.	"Time for Heroes" (from Up the Bracket)		2:39
3.	"Mayday" (b-side to "What a Waster" single)		1:04
4.	"Don't Look Back into the Sun" (non-album single)		2:58
5.	"Tell the King" (from Up the Bracket)		3:23
6.	"What Katie Did" (from The Libertines)	Doherty	3:51
7.	"Can't Stand Me Now" (from The Libertines)	Doherty / Barât / Richard Hammerton	3:24
8.	"What a Waster" (non-album single)		2:59
9.	"The Delaney" (b-Side to "Up the Bracket" single)		2:41
10.	"Boys in the Band" (from Up the Bracket)		3:43
11.	"Death on the Stairs" (Re-recorded version, b-side to "Don't Look Back into the Sun" single)		3:44
12.	"I Get Along" (from Up the Bracket)		2:51
13.	"What Became of the Likely Lads" (from The Libertines)		3:21
Total length:			39:18

Bonus tracks

Bonus tracks on Japanese edition
No.	Title	Length
14.	"Vertigo" (from Up the Bracket)	2:37
15.	"Music When the Lights Go Out" (from The Libertines)	3:02

Bonus track on iTunes edition
No.	Title	Length
14.	"Horrorshow (Demo)" (previously unreleased)	3:01

== Personnel ==
- Mick Jones - producer (tracks: 1, 2, 5 to 7, 9, 10, 12, 13)
- Bernard Butler - producer (tracks: 3, 4, 8, 11)

== Charts ==
Chart (2007)	Peak position
UK Albums Chart	23
German Albums Chart	62
Japan Albums Chart	155

== Certifications ==
Region	Certification	Certified units/sales
United Kingdom (BPI)	Gold	100,000^{‡}
^{‡} Sales+streaming figures based on certification alone.
