= One Eye on the Banquet =

EP by Yeti
- Released: October 30, 2006
- Recorded: 2006
- Genre: Indie Rock
- Producer: Craig Silvey (tracks 1–4), Justin Saban (track 5)

Yeti chronology
One Eye on the Banquet (2006)	Yume! (2007)

One Eye On The Banquet is a limited edition EP by Yeti featuring tracks recorded with producer Craig Silvey, expected to be working with them on their debut album to be released in 2007. The artwork for the release was designed by the band. The artwork used on the front cover image is a photo of a silver brooch "I Can See You" by Giedymin Jablonski - courtesy of the artist.

Tracks 1 & 5 were written by Mark Underwood. Tracks 2 & 4 were written by John Hassall. Track 3 was written by Andy Déian, and marks the first time that a song he has written has been included on a Yeti release.

== Track listings ==
- CD
1. "Last Time You Go" – 2:33
2. "Moneygod" – 4:20
3. "Song for the Dead" – 3:20
4. "Magpie Blues" – 3:51
5. "Insect-Eating Man" – 3:52
- 7"
1. "The Last Time You Go" – 2:33
2. "Moneygod" – 4:20
3. "Song for the Dead" – 3:20
4. "Magpie Blues" – 3:51

== Critical reception ==
Professional ratings
Review scores
Source	Rating
Drowned in Sound	7/10 stars

Lianne Steinberg of Drowned in Sound said John Hassall's performance on One Eye on the Banquet was completely different in comparison to his previous time in The Libertines.
