= Back to the Bus =

Back to the Bus may refer to:

- Back to the Bus (Babyshambles album), 2006
- Back to the Bus (Funeral for a Friend album), 2007
