= I Get Along =

I Get Along may refer to:

- I Get Along EP, a 2003 EP from The Libertines
  - "I Get Along", a 2002 song by the Libertines from their debut album Up the Bracket, released as the lead track of the above EP
- "I Get Along" (Pet Shop Boys song), a 2002 song by the Pet Shop Boys from their album Release
