= The Likely Lads (disambiguation) =

The Likely Lads is a BBC television sitcom series broadcast in black and white between 1964 and 1966.

The Likely Lads may also refer to:

- Whatever Happened to the Likely Lads?, a BBC series and sequel to The Likely Lads broadcast in colour between 1973 and 1974
- The Likely Lads (film), a 1976 film based on Whatever Happened to the Likely Lads?

== See also ==
- "What Became of the Likely Lads", a song by the Libertines released in 2004
- What Became of the Likely Lads (EP), an EP released by the Libertines in 2005
