= Rough Trade Sampler 02 International Edition =

Compilation album by Various artists
- Released: November 2005
- Genre: Indie/Alternative rock
- Length: 58:30
- Label: Rough Trade

Rough Trade Sampler 02 International Edition is a compilation released in late 2005 to promote new material from the label's artists. It was released in CD format.

== Track list ==
1. "Power Out" – 5:12 (Arcade Fire)
2. "16 Military Wives" – 4:46 (The Decemberists)
3. "Ring a Ding Ding" – 1:38 (The Brakes)
4. "Fools Life" – 2:27 (Dr. Dog)
5. "Frequency" – 4:41 (Super Furry Animals)
6. "Out of Nowhere" – 2:53 (Delays)
7. "Nothing Brings Me Down" – 3:57 (Emiliana Torrini)
8. "Decisions, Decisions" – 3:07 (Nobody + Mystic Chords of Memory)
9. "Francesca's Party" – 3:12 (Baxter Dury)
10. "House Where We Live" – 4:22 (The Veils)
11. "Tiny Cities Made of Ash" – 3:14 (Sun Kil Moon)
12. "I Wish You Well" – 4:20 (Cara Dillon)
13. "Don't Come Running" – 3:28 (Hal)
14. "Their Way" – 3:08 (Littl'ans)
15. "Throw It on a Fire" – 4:48 (Bell Orchestra)
16. "Topknot" (Mia Mix) – 3:11 (Cornershop)
