= Stalking Pete Doherty =

2005 film

Max Carlish

Stalking Pete Doherty is a rockumentary assembled from footage shot by the filmmaker Max Carlish. As the title suggests, it is about both attempts by Carlish to interview the musician Pete Doherty.

== Filmmaker ==
Carlish is a British documentary filmmaker and former lecturer in media studies, born to Jewish parents in the city of Birmingham. Carlish helped produce an Emmy and BAFTA Award-winning television series about the Royal Opera House in London. He is most famous, however, for his attempts to produce a so-called rockumentary about Pete Doherty, lead vocalist and guitarist with the Libertines and Babyshambles. Doherty was charged with assault and blackmail of the filmmaker after Carlish sold photographs of Doherty taking heroin to Sunday newspapers.

== Release and reception ==
Carlish's footage was used in a programme entitled Stalking Pete Doherty broadcast on 17 May 2005, and then again on 11 March 2006 on Channel 4. In fact, the programme focused more on Carlish's apparent obsession with Doherty than it did with Doherty's life.

I've never heard of a journalist slash documentary maker who would so demean himself in order to get his story as Max Carlish, who made himself the clown of the Babyshambles posse as if it was an honourable tactic. Max Carlish deserved a good punch on the nose.

— Neil McCormick, music journalist

"A friend of mine saw the footage of him taking heroin and thought I could sell them," Carlish commented. "Before I knew it I was in the middle of a bidding war. I was desperate for money and by this point I had convinced myself I would never see Pete again, would never be able to complete my film."

"Max on Pete on Kate, Max inside Pete up Kate". Carlish, seen here sporting the black eye he received from Doherty, was widely ridiculed as a "documentalist".

The film was never finished. Stalking Pete Doherty was produced by North One Television, who, in the words of one critic, "recognised that it was Carlish's struggle and failure to make his film that was the real story". Doherty reportedly attempted to halt the broadcast by Channel 4, on the basis that the footage taken by Carlish was in fact owned by his management company.

== Personal life ==
Carlish was educated at King David Primary School and then King Edward's School, Birmingham where he was a keen amateur dramatist – writing and performing a "hip-hop opera" in which Carlish "rapped" about a mystical "Rock of Crack" (Cocaine) and where at least one contemporary remembers him as energetically outspoken even at a young age. He would later attend the prestigious American preparatory school the Hotchkiss School in Lakeville, Connecticut. Carlish was known to socialise with students, even taking drugs with some of them on more than a number of occasions. This element of his lifestyle was briefly touched upon in the Stalking Pete Doherty documentary.

== Aftermath ==
Carlish subsequently worked as planning manager for Great City Attractions, a Ferris wheel operator which collapsed in 2012.
