= Roger Sargent =

Roger Sargent may refer to:

- Roger Sargent (chemical engineer) (1926–2018), British chemical engineer and professor
- Roger Sargent (photographer) (born 1970), British photographer, known for his work with bands and musicians
