= Yume! =

Compilation album by Yeti
- Released: 29 August 2007
- Genre: Indie rock
- Length: 39:19
- Label: Vinyl Junkie
- Producer: Steve Musters, Craig Silvey, Justin Saban

Yeti chronology
One Eye on the Banquet (2006)	Yume! (2007)	The Legend Of Yeti Gonzales

Yume! is a compilation album of UK band Yeti, released on 29 August 2007 by Japanese indie record label, Vinyl Junkie. Most of the tracks had been previously released in the United Kingdom on singles or the EP, "One Eye on the Banquet".
Tracks 1, 3, 4, 6, 8 and 10 written by John Hassall.
2, 5, 7 and 11 by Mark Underwood.
9 and 12 by Andrew Déian.

== Track listing ==
1. "Never Lose Your Sense of Wonder"
2. "In Like With You"
3. "Merry Go Round"
4. "Keep Pushin' On"
5. "The Last Time You Go"
6. "Up and Down"
7. "Midnight Flight"
8. "Forgotten Melody"
9. "Song for the Dead"
10. "Carpet Road"
11. "Insect-Eating Man"
12. "Jermyn Girls (Cave Demo)"

"Jermyn Girls (Cave Demo)" is Japanese Bonus Track"
