= I Get Along EP =

I Get Along

EP by The Libertines
- Released: 1 September 2003
- Recorded: 2003
- Genre: Garage rock revival, punk rock, indie rock
- Length: 11:23
- Label: Rough Trade
- Producer: Mick Jones, Bernard Butler

The Libertines chronology
Up the Bracket (2002)	I Get Along (2003)	Don't Look Back into the Sun EP (2003)

Professional ratings
Review scores
Source	Rating
Allmusic	3/5 stars
Pitchfork	5.3/10
Rolling Stone	3/5 stars
Spin	B

"I Get Along" is a song by the English rock band The Libertines.

== Overview ==
There are two versions of the song: the original version produced by Bernard Butler that was released as a B-side to the band's debut single "What a Waster" and the later version produced by Mick Jones that was included on their debut album Up the Bracket.

"I Get Along" was also released as a lead song on USA-only 5-track EP, featuring tracks from the band's various single releases. Import version of the EP charted at number 99 in the UK.

== Track listing ==
All songs written by Pete Doherty and Carl Barât.

No.	Title	Length
1.	"I Get Along"	2:52
2.	"Don't Look Back into the Sun"	3:00
3.	"The Delaney"	2:41
4.	"Mayday"	1:03
5.	"Skag & Bone Man"	1:48
Total length:		11:23
