= The Legend of Yeti Gonzales =

Studio album by Yeti
- Released: June 23, 2008
- Recorded: Eastcote Studios, December 2007
- Genre: Indie rock, psychedelic rock, garage rock
- Label: Get Up & Go Records
- Producer: Yeti

Yeti chronology
Yume! (2007)	The Legend of Yeti Gonzales (2008)

Professional ratings
Review scores
Source	Rating
Daily Mirror	4/5 stars
Clash	(?)
Gigwise	3.5/5 stars
World of Music	3/5 stars

The Legend of Yeti Gonzales is the debut studio album by the band Yeti.

== Track listing ==
1. "Obviously"
2. "Don't Go Back to the One You Love"
3. "Til the Weekend Comes"
4. "Merry Go Round"
5. "In Like with You"
6. "Shane MacGowan"
7. "Midnight Flight"
8. "Jermyn Girls"
9. "Never Lose Your Sense of Wonder"
10. "Reprise"
11. "Can't Pretend"
12. "Sister Sister"
13. "Last Time You Go"
14. "Who Is Gonzales?"

== Track listing (Japanese version) ==
1. "Don't Go Back to the One You Love"
2. "Obviously"
3. "Til the Weekend Comes"
4. "Working for the Industry"
5. "Dream"
6. "Lolita Ethelred"
7. "Shane MacGowan"
8. "Jermyn Girls"
9. "Flesh & Bone"
10. "Reprise"
11. "Can't Pretend"
12. "Sister Sister"
13. "Midnight Flight"
14. "Moneygod"
15. "Keep Pushin' On (Live at the BBC)"
16. "Don't Go Back to the One You Love (Radio Mix)"
