= The Libertines (album) =

Studio album by The Libertines
- Released: 30 August 2004
- Recorded: Spring 2004
- Genre: Garage rock revival; indie rock
- Length: 42:04
- Label: Rough Trade
- Producer: Mick Jones

The Libertines chronology
Up the Bracket (2002)	The Libertines (2004)	Time for Heroes – The Best of The Libertines (2007)

Singles from The Libertines
- 1. "Can't Stand Me Now" Released: 9 August 2004; 2. "What Became of the Likely Lads" Released: 25 October 2004

The Libertines is the second studio album by the English indie rock band The Libertines. Released on 30 August 2004, it is particularly biographical of the relationship between frontmen Carl Barât and Pete Doherty. The album debuted at number one on the UK Albums Chart, selling 72,189 copies in its first week of release.

== Release and promotion ==
The Libertines, like its 2002 predecessor, Up the Bracket, was re-released with a bonus DVD on 22 November 2004. The DVD, entitled Boys in the Band, is a collection of live shows, band interviews, and the "Can't Stand Me Now" promotional video.

The song "What Katie Did" was released as a one-sided, 7-inch flexi disc given away with Amelia's Magazine.

The song "Arbeit Macht Frei" featured in the 2006 film Children of Men.

=== Cover art ===
The album's front cover art features a photograph of Carl Barât and Pete Doherty taken by Roger Sargent during the emotional "Freedom Gig" at the Tap 'n' Tin club in Chatham, Kent, on 8 October 2003, when Doherty reunited with the Libertines for a gig just hours after being released from jail, where he was sentenced for breaking into Barât's flat and stealing various items, including an old guitar and a laptop computer. Doherty returned to the Tap 'n' Tin club on 20 December 2008 for a one-off gig with Chas & Dave.

== Critical reception ==
Professional ratings
Aggregate scores
Source	Rating
Metacritic	80/100
Review scores
Source	Rating
AllMusic	3.5/5 stars
Entertainment Weekly	C
The Guardian	4/5 stars
Mojo	4/5 stars
NME	9/10
Pitchfork	7.1/10
Q	4/5 stars
Rolling Stone	3.5/5 stars
Spin	A−
The Village Voice	A−

The album is included in the book 1001 Albums You Must Hear Before You Die. In 2006, NME placed the album 47 in a list of the greatest British albums ever. In 2013, NME ranked the album at number 99 in its list of The 500 Greatest Albums of All Time. On the other hand, The Libertines was voted the third-most overrated album ever made in a 2005 BBC public poll.

== Track listing ==
1. "Can't Stand Me Now" (Peter Doherty, Carl Barât, Mark Hammerton) – 3:23
2. "Last Post on the Bugle" (Doherty, Barât, Michael Bower) – 2:32
3. "Don't Be Shy" (Doherty, Barât) – 3:03
4. "The Man Who Would Be King" (Doherty, Barât) – 3:59
5. "Music When the Lights Go Out" (Doherty) – 3:02
6. "Narcissist" (Barât) – 2:10
7. "The Ha Ha Wall" (Doherty, Barât) – 2:29
8. "Arbeit Macht Frei" (Doherty) – 1:13
9. "Campaign of Hate" (Doherty) – 2:10
10. "What Katie Did" (Doherty) – 3:49
11. "Tomblands" (Barât, Doherty) – 2:06
12. "The Saga" (Doherty, Paul Roundhill) – 1:53
13. "Road to Ruin" (Doherty, Barât) – 4:21
14. "What Became of the Likely Lads" (Doherty, Barât) / "France" (Barât) (Hidden track) – 5:54

Bonus tracks on the Japanese edition

15. "Don't Look Back into the Sun" (New Version) (Doherty, Barât)
16. "Cyclops" (Doherty, Peter Wolfe)
17. "Dilly Boys" (Doherty, Barât)

Bonus tracks on the Australian edition

15. "France" (Doherty, Barât)
16. "Never Never" (Doherty, Barât)
17. "I Got Sweets" (Doherty, Barât)

Boys in the Band bonus DVD

1. Live At Factory (19 April 2003) – 17:09
  - "What a Waster" (Live at The Factory, Japan)
  - "Death on the Stairs" (Live at The Factory, Japan)
  - "Up the Bracket" (Live at The Factory, Japan)
  - "I Get Along" (Live at The Factory, Japan)
  - "The Boy Looked at Johnny" (Live at The Factory, Japan)
2. Live At Moby Dick, Madrid (November 2002) – 2:57
  - "The Boy Looked at Johnny" (Live at Moby Dick, Spain)
3. Live At Busking For Beer (1 December 2003) – 11:31
4. "Can't Stand Me Now" (Video) – 3:22
5. Scenes From Forum – 10:40
6. Photo Gallery – 3:01
7. Extras
  - In the Van
  - Interviews
  - NME Awards
  - Credits

== Charts ==
=== Weekly charts ===
Chart (2004)	Peak position
Australian Albums (ARIA)	53
Austrian Albums (Ö3 Austria)	31
Belgian Albums (Ultratop Flanders)	24
Belgian Albums (Ultratop Wallonia)	60
Dutch Albums (Album Top 100)	53
French Albums (SNEP)	27
German Albums (Offizielle Top 100)	20
Irish Albums (IRMA)	5
Italian Albums (FIMI)	51
Japanese Albums (Oricon)	18
Norwegian Albums (VG-lista)	34
Swedish Albums (Sverigetopplistan)	18
Swiss Albums (Schweizer Hitparade)	51
UK Albums (OCC)	1
US Billboard 200	111

=== Year-end charts ===
Chart (2004)	Position
UK Albums (OCC)	75
Chart (2005)	Position
UK Albums (OCC)	190

== Certifications ==
Region	Certification	Certified units/sales
United Kingdom (BPI)	Platinum	300,000^{^}
^{^} Shipments figures based on certification alone.
