= Peter Doherty: Stranger in My Own Skin =

2023 film

- Directed by: Katia deVidas
- Starring: Pete Doherty
- Production company: Wendy Productions c/o Federation Studios
- Release date: October 6, 2023 (Zurich)
- Running time: 92 minutes
- Language: English

Peter Doherty: Stranger in My Own Skin is a 2023 biographical documentary film about Pete Doherty, directed by his now-wife Katia deVidas.

== Plot ==
"It tells the very intimate story of Doherty's addictions over the decades, using personal, unflinching footage that has been accumulating since 2006."

== Cast ==
- Pete Doherty

== Release ==
Peter Doherty: Stranger in My Own Skin premiered at the 2023 Zurich Film Festival. It was released on 9 November 2023 in UK cinemas, and on 16 November in Australia.

== Reception ==
The film has an 80% rating on Rotten Tomatoes. Reviewing the film in The Guardian, Peter Bradshaw wrote that it "is unsparing in showing his struggles with drug addiction but shies away from other personal stories". Daniel Dylan Wray wrote at The Quietus that "It's using the documentary format as a means of executing subtle PR work, to present an image of a man under the guise of a warts-and-all film, all the while carefully controlling exactly what is revealed".
