= Keep Pushin' On =

Single by Yeti
- Released: 29 August 2005
- Length: 2:36
- Label: Moshi Moshi Records
- Songwriter(s): Hassall/Underwood
- Producer(s): Steve Musters

Yeti singles chronology
| "Never Lose Your Sense Of Wonder" (2005) | "Keep Pushin' On" (2005) |

"Keep Pushin' On" is the second single by English rock band Yeti. It reached number 57 in the UK Singles Chart. All three tracks from the single are included on the singles-compilation Yume!, released only in Japan in 2007. B-side, "In Like With You", was included on their debut album, The Legend of Yeti Gonzales, from 2008.

== Track listings ==
CD and download

1. "Keep Pushin' On" 2:36
2. "In Like With You" 3:06
3. "Carpet Road" 2:45

7"

1. "Keep Pushin' On" 2:36
2. "In Like With You" 3:06
