= The Cabin Sydney =

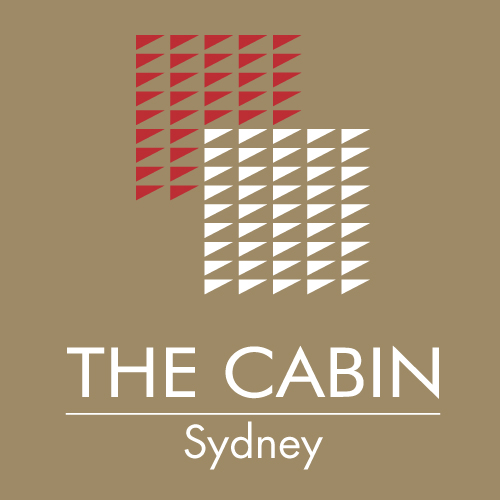

Geography
- Location: Sydney, New South Wales, Australia

Organisation
- Type: Specialist

Services
- Speciality: Addiction treatment

History
- Founded: 2015

Links
- Website: www.thecabin.com

The Cabin Sydney is an outpatient addiction treatment clinic. The facility has been recognized as the first multinational addiction treatment provider in Australia. The Cabin Sydney is an affiliate of The Cabin Addiction Services Group. The Cabin Addiction Services Group also owns The Cabin Chiang Mai inpatient rehab. The Cabin Sydney opened in July 2015 and is located in Sydney, Australia. In July 2016, The Cabin Sydney completed a study which found that 70% of crystal methamphetamine addicts required rehabilitation rather than jail. The Cabin Addiction Services Group also operates the Cabin Melbourne.
