= Never Lose Your Sense of Wonder =

Single by Yeti
- Released: 28 March 2005
- Length: 2:50
- Label: Moshi Moshi Records
- Songwriter(s): Hassall/Underwood

Yeti singles chronology
| "Never Lose Your Sense of Wonder" (2005) | "Keep Pushin' On" (2005) |

"Never Lose Your Sense of Wonder" is the debut single by English rock band Yeti. The title track and b-side Midnight Flight are included on the singles-compilation Yume!, released only in Japan in 2007 and is included on their debut album The Legend Of Yeti Gonzales. It reached #36 on the UK Singles Chart.

== Track listings ==
- CD
1. "Never Lose Your Sense Of Wonder" (Hassall) 2:50
2. "Working For The Industry" (Hassall) 2:22
3. "Midnight Flight" (Underwood) 3:01
- 7"
1. "Never Lose Your Sense Of Wonder" 2:50
2. "Working For The Industry" 2:22
- Download
1. "Never Lose Your Sense Of Wonder" 2:50
2. "Working For The Industry" 2:22
3. "Midnight Flight" 3:01

== Charts ==
| Chart (2006) | Peak position |
|---|---|
| UK Singles (OCC) | 36 |
