= Back to the Bus (Babyshambles album) =

Compilation album by Various artists
- Released: 4 September 2006
- Genre: Indie rock, garage rock, punk rock
- Label: DMC

Various artists chronology
Back to the Bus (2007)	Back to the Bus (2006)

Back to the Bus is a compilation of the British band Babyshambles's favourite songs, released on 4 September 2006.

== Track listing ==
1. The Creation – Making Time (2:53)
2. The Clash – Jail Guitar Doors (2:49)
3. Littl'ans – Their Way (2:59)
4. Love – Your Friend and Mine - Neil's Songs (3:35)
5. Dennis Brown – Money in My Pocket (3:48)
6. Cazals – New Boy in Town (2:27)
7. Social – To the Bone (3:15)
8. Johnny Thunders – Chinese Rocks (2:49)
9. Noisettes – IWE (3:25)
10. Saint Etienne – Only Love Can Break Your Heart (4:28)
11. Esther Phillips – Just Say Goodbye (2:12)
12. Graham Collier – Aberdeen Angus (6:00)
13. Belle & Sebastian – Mornington Crescent (5:29)
14. Bert Jansch – Needle of Death (3:16)
15. The Stone Roses – Going Down (2:45)
16. Babyshambles – What Katy Did (acoustic) (2:11)
17. Tourbus Tales – Babyshambles interview (8:29)
