= The Libertines Bound Together =

2006 book

- Author: Anthony Thornton, Roger Sargent
- Language: English
- Genre: Non-fiction
- Publisher: Time Warner Books
- Publication date: February 23, 2006

The Libertines Bound Together is a book focused on the English rock band The Libertines by the writer, Anthony Thornton, and the photographer, Roger Sargent. The book was first published in hardback on February 23, 2006, by Time Warner Books.

Bound Together documents, in words and pictures, the band's existence from early conception to the various bands spawned from The Libertines' demise. This book contains over 100 images of The Libertines, dozens of which are previously unpublished.

The full front page title reads: "The Libertines Bound Together. The definitive story of Peter Doherty and Carl Barat and how they changed British music."

== Back Cover Quotes ==
- "Dedicated and visionary...Rogert Sargent was the perfect mirror: truthful without doubt, perceptive without ego...bedside manner of minotaur!" Carl Barât
- "Anthony Thornton is a better writer than Lester Bangs" Peter Doherty

== Reviews ==
- "Bound Together reads like a great thriller, yet has moments - like an exceptional passage on an impromptu Doherty gig in Chelsea that helped split the band - that evoke the poetry, courage and optimism that surrounded Doherty at his best" Q **** Recommended
- "[Sargent's] shots reclaim the band from the tabloids' caricature portrayal and stand as a fine testament to their rebellious, joyous, yet ultimately destructive Arcadian dream. Anthony Thornton's accompanying text is equally enrapturing." Mojo ****
- "An intelligent and pacy exploration of a musical phenomenon" The Independent
- "...the story of the band and the fallout from their split is recorded in intimate detail. Thornton and Sargent, with full access to the battling frontmen, had a unique insight into their complex relationship" UNCUT
- "A nicely produced book...Thornton's intention is to give a good, respectful account of the artistic project of Barat and Doherty, and in this the book is a success." Independent on Sunday. Consequently, the critics of the Independent on Sunday voted it book of the week on 26 March 2006.
- "Writer Thornton and photographer Sargent really were on the spot (be it the van, the pub, the East End squat or the dressing room) while most of the squalid Libertines saga went down, capturing the queasy zigzags of the bands career." The Sunday Times
- "Pete Doherty and Carl Barat fans should check out a new history of The Libertines, called Bound Together. After a couple of poor books on Pete this is the first I can recommend." The Sun
- "The photographs tell the story as movingly as any text possibly could....What's surprising especially for me - who couldn't give a monkey's about Peter 'n' bloody Carl - is just how involving the book actually is... [it's] driven by a literate, witty narration... hugely entertaining." The Word

== See also ==
- The Libertines
- Pete Doherty
- Carl Barât
