= All Quiet on the Eastern Esplanade =

Studio album by the Libertines
- Released: 5 April 2024
- Recorded: February–March 2023
- Studio: Albion Rooms (Margate)
- Length: 38:29
- Label: EMI
- Producer: Dimitri Tikovoï

The Libertines chronology
Anthems for Doomed Youth (2015)	All Quiet on the Eastern Esplanade (2024)

Singles from All Quiet on the Eastern Esplanade
- 1. "Run Run Run" Released: 13 October 2023; 2. "Night of the Hunter" Released: 6 December 2023; 3. "Shiver" Released: 19 January 2024

All Quiet on the Eastern Esplanade is the fourth studio album by English garage rock band the Libertines, released on 5 April 2024 through EMI. It is also their first studio album release in over eight years, following Anthems for Doomed Youth (2015).

== Background ==
On 14 October 2023, the band shared the lead single "Run Run Run" and announced the accompanying album. The song was seen as a "classic yet subtly raucous Libs indie dancefloor anthem". Frontman Carl Barât described it as the "lifelong project of a life on the lash" and drew comparisons to the 1971 novel Post Office.

About the album, Pete Doherty revealed that the band "really came together" and found a "moment of rare peace" creating the project comprising 11 tracks. Doherty and Barât first started working on the record in September 2022 at a studio in Geejam in Port Antonio, Jamaica before reuniting with John Hassall and Gary Powell. All Quiet on the Eastern Esplanade was recorded over a four-week period in February and March 2023 at the Albion Rooms in Margate, a location owned by the band members. Produced by Dimitri Tikovoï, the recording process felt like them being all "in the same place, at the same speed" and connected for once, according to Barât. All four band members share songwriting credits on every track.

== Critical reception ==
Professional ratings
Aggregate scores
Source	Rating
Metacritic	72/100
Review scores
Source	Rating
AllMusic	3.5/5 stars
Classic Rock	8/10
Mojo	4/5 stars
NME	4/5 stars
Pitchfork	6.3/10
Uncut	7/10

All Quiet on the Eastern Esplanade received generally favourable reviews from critics. On Metacritic, which assigns a normalised score out of 100 to reviews from mainstream publications, the album holds a weighted average score of 72 based on 14 reviews.

Several critics framed the album as evidence of a newly stable band. Writing for NME, Max Pilley awarded the album four out of five stars, arguing that the volatility that once defined the group had given way to a steadier, safer incarnation, and that the record succeeded without chasing the highs of their early material. The review singled out "Man With the Melody", on which all four members share lead vocals, and the revenge narrative "Night of the Hunter" as highlights. Rolling Stone UK similarly described the record as classic Libertines material reframed through the perspective of four men in their forties, calling the result "a complete riot".

Reviewers also noted a broadening of the band's sound and subject matter. Mojo observed that the album largely set aside the group's habitual nostalgia for old Albion in favour of songs about contemporary Britain, and judged that Doherty's songwriting rose to the occasion. Classic Rock called it the band's most expansive and ambitious record, citing its excursions into fado, blues and orchestral arrangements. Uncut credited producers Dimitri Tikovoï and Dan Grech-Marguerat with adding polish and unexpectedly stately arrangements to the band's familiar clatter.

Other assessments were more reserved. Pitchfork's Ben Cardew rated the album 6.3 out of 10, describing the reunited group as settling into "the congenial sound of a pretty good band" and suggesting they were short on new ideas even as they remained capable of strong individual songs. AllMusic's Heather Phares felt the band had not fully redefined themselves as veterans, but praised "Merry Old England" and "Night of the Hunter" and concluded that the album sounded more like the work of a functioning band than its predecessor Anthems for Doomed Youth (2015), with enough strong material to sustain fans' faith.

== Commercial performance ==
All Quiet on the Eastern Esplanade debuted atop the UK Albums Chart selling 21,706 units.

== Track listing ==
All tracks are written by Carl Barât, Pete Doherty, John Hassall and Gary Powell, with additional writers noted.

All Quiet on the Eastern Esplanade track listing
No.	Title	Length
1.	"Run Run Run" (Danny Connors)	2:53
2.	"Mustangs" (Connors)	3:27
3.	"I Have a Friend"	2:58
4.	"Merry Old England"	4:49
5.	"Man with the Melody" (Oliver Rhys, Jamie Treays)	3:56
6.	"Oh Shit"	3:01
7.	"Night of the Hunter"	4:08
8.	"Baron's Claw" (Mike Moore)	3:37
9.	"Shiver"	3:00
10.	"Be Young"	2:33
11.	"Songs They Never Play on the Radio"	4:07
Total length:		38:29

== Personnel ==
The Libertines

- Carl Barât – vocals, guitar (all tracks); piano (tracks 5, 8, 11), background vocals (9, 11)
- Pete Doherty – guitar (all tracks), background vocals (tracks 1, 2, 6, 11), vocals (5, 7, 10, 11)
- John Hassall – background vocals (tracks 1, 2, 6, 10, 11), drums (1), bass (2–11); synthesizer programming, vocals (5); piano (8)
- Gary Powell – background vocals (tracks 1, 2, 6, 10, 11), drums (2–11), string arrangement (5, 7), vocals (5), percussion (7)

Additional musicians

- Richie Kennedy – programming (all tracks), percussion (track 1), piano (2), background vocals (6), clapping (9)
- Dimitri Tikovoï – percussion (tracks 1–10), Wurlitzer electric piano (1), piano (2, 4, 7, 9, 11), organ (2), keyboards (4, 7, 9–11), background vocals (6)
- Dan Grech-Marguerat – programming
- Julie Gay – background vocals (tracks 2, 3, 11)
- Pascale Mason – background vocals (2, 3, 11)
- Alice Allen – cello (tracks 4, 5, 7, 11)
- Liam Brolly – viola (tracks 4, 5, 7, 11)
- Fiona Brice – violin (tracks 4, 5, 7, 11)
- Katrina Lee – violin (tracks 4, 5, 7, 11)
- Claude Samuel Levine – theremin (track 7)
- Atholl Ransome – saxophone (track 8)
- Malcolm Strachan – trombone, trumpet (track 8)

Technical

- Dimitri Tikovoï – production
- Matt Colton – mastering
- Dan Grech-Marguerat – mixing
- Richie Kennedy – engineering
- Matthew Boyle – engineering (tracks 4, 5, 7, 11)
- Ben Barker – engineering (track 8)
- Fiona Brice – string arrangement (tracks 4, 5, 7, 11)
- The Haggis Horns – recording arrangement (8)
- Charles Haydon Hicks – mixing assistance
- Luke Burgoyne – mixing assistance
- Eliaz Le Floch – engineering assistance
- Jason Stafford – engineering assistance

== Charts ==
Chart performance for All Quiet on the Eastern Esplanade
Chart (2024)	Peak position
Austrian Albums (Ö3 Austria)	4
Belgian Albums (Ultratop Flanders)	40
Belgian Albums (Ultratop Wallonia)	8
French Albums (SNEP)	21
German Albums (Offizielle Top 100)	7
Irish Albums (IRMA)	51
Japanese Albums (Oricon)	31
Japanese Hot Albums (Billboard Japan)	41
Scottish Albums (Official Charts)	1
Swiss Albums (Schweizer Hitparade)	8
UK Albums (Official Charts)	1
UK Independent Albums (Official Charts)	6
