= Roger Sargent (photographer) =

Roger Sargent (born 1970 in London) is a British photographer known for his work with bands and musicians.

Sargent graduated with a documentary photography degree at Newport College.

Sargent has worked as a music photographer for NME, Melody Maker, ID Magazine, Rolling Stone, MOJO and The Guardian and was awarded the outstanding contribution to music photography at the 2007 Record of the Day Awards for Music Journalism and PR. In 2012 he received the Outstanding Contribution to Music Photography Award at the NME awards.

He has photographed many bands and musicians, in both live and photoshoot settings, with photographs being used for press, promotional purposes and album covers, including The Libertines, The Charlatans, Blur, Richard Ashcroft, Suede, Paul Weller, Radiohead, Bloc Party, Cat Power, AC/DC, Liam Gallagher, Kasabian, Trampolene, Reverend & the Makers, Ash, Sleeper, Bob Mould, Fatboy Slim, Linkin Park.

Roger Sargent has had major photography exhibitions in London, including Oasis "Beentheredonethat" in 2002, "Future Legends" and "The Libertines - Boys in the Band" in 2013.

Sargent has filmed and directed many music videos, for bands including The Libertines, Suede, Trampolene, Baxter Dury,Slaves, Sleaford Mods.

In 2012, Sargent's full-length documentary "The Libertines - There Are No Innocent Bystanders" was released. This was followed in 2014 by a shorter "visual history" film of The Libertines, screened before their reunion Hyde Park show.

In 2016, "Night Thoughts", Sargent's film made to accompany Suede's album of the same name was released.

In 2019 Sargent's film "All At Sea", documenting the recording of the Peter Doherty and the Puta Madres self-titled album was released as a DVD to accompany the cd version of the album, and subsequently added to Doherty's Youtube channel.

Sargent's photographs feature in the 2006 biography The Libertines - Bound Together which he co-produced with writer and music journalist Anthony Thornton.

In 2020, Sargent was featured on a Sky Arts documentary "Icon: Music Through the Lens".

A virtual exhibition of Sargent's archive of Libertines photographs launched on 17 July 2021 at Snap Galleries.
