= Hope Rehab Centre =

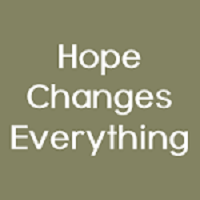

Geography
- Location: Si Racha, Chonburi, Thailand

Organisation
- Type: Residential Rehab for Addictions

Services
- Beds: 35

History
- Opened: 2013

Links
- Website: Hope Rehab Centre

Hope Rehab Centre is a drug and alcohol rehabilitation centre in Si Racha, Thailand.

== History ==
The Hope Rehab Centre was founded by Simon Mott and Alon Kumsawad in 2013. Mott had previously worked at The Cabin Chiang Mai rehab centre, serving as that facility's head counsellor and manager. In late 2014, musician Pete Doherty was treated at the facility. After his time there, he launched the Peter Doherty Hope Initiative to provide funding for other patients at the centre. The centre is part of a trend of medical tourism, attracting many of its patients from overseas.

== Facility ==
The Hope Rehab Centre is located on a seven-acre estate in Si Racha near the Gulf of Thailand. It contains 35 beds and is licensed by the Thailand Ministry of Health, the United Kingdom's Federation of Drug and Alcohol Practitioners and the U.S.-based Association for Addiction Professionals. The centre uses modern and holistic rehabilitation methods and treats a variety of drug, alcohol, and behavioral addictions.

== Programs ==
Methods include a twelve-step program, cognitive behavioral therapy, mindfulness-based cognitive therapy, and engagement in health and fitness activities like yoga, swimming, pilates, tai chi and others. Meditation, sessions of recovery coaching, intensive counselling and periodic tourist outings are other activities that patients may engage in. The length of the program varies from short-term stays (30 days) to longer-term stays (60 to 90 days or more).

== See also ==
- Drug rehabilitation
- Alternative medicine
