= Yeti (band) =

English rock band

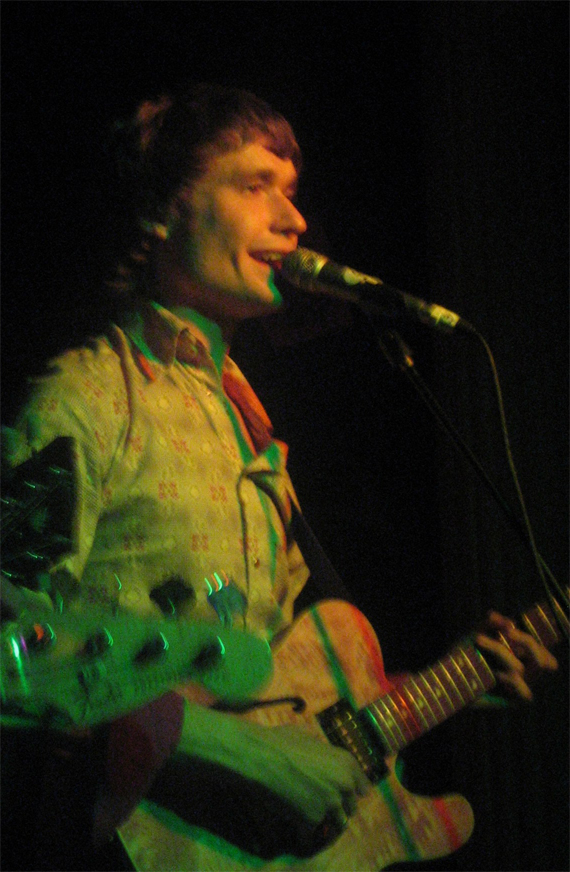

Background information
- Origin: England, United Kingdom
- Genres: Indie rock; psychedelic rock; garage rock
- Years active: 2005–2009
- Labels: Moshi Moshi; Get Up & Go
- Website: yetigonzales.com

Yeti was an English rock band founded in 2004 by John Hassall of The Libertines. Hassall met Brendan Kersey, Andrew Deian and Mark Underwood (formerly Harmony Williams) through mutual friends, and the line-up was completed when drummer Graham Blacow responded to a classified advertisement. The band was based in North London.

== Career ==
Yeti began with Hassall as the main songwriter, but soon Underwood started writing and singing a few of his own (including lead-off track on One Eye on the Banquet, "The Last Time You Go" and "Insect-Eating Man"), while Deian has also penned several tracks, including their single "Don't Go Back to the One You Love" and "Jermyn Girls". The NME compared the band's sound to "early" Beatles, The La's, The Kinks, The Byrds, The Coral, The Zombies, Love and early "pre-Rough Trade" Libertines.

Their debut single "Never Lose Your Sense Of Wonder" was released in March 2005, and sold out within 3 days. It reached top 30 in the UK Singles Chart. It was named "Single of the Week" by The Guardian and the NME. "Keep Pushin' On" was released on 29 August 2005 under Moshi Moshi Records and reached No. 57.

The band was also featured in magazines such as Vogue, Arena, GQ, Spin, Dazed & Confused and Clash. In December 2005, Yeti played "Noise and Confusion 05" – their biggest show to date – at the Cardiff Millennium Stadium, opening for Oasis and Foo Fighters. This was followed by a string of supporting shows on Oasis' European Tour in February 2006. Yeti featured in the 2006 advertising campaign for the Italian fashion label "Energie".

At the end of October 2006, the band released a limited edition EP, One Eye on the Banquet. They played a series of small gigs in the UK during the final months of the year.

In early 2007, Kersey left the band and joined London band The Early Years, with Hassall taking over on his favoured bass.

The band played their first show as a four-piece at the Proud Gallery in London in August 2007. Yeti released a compilation album, Yume!, in Japan on 29 August 2007, and the band played shows in Tokyo, Fukuoka, Kyoto, Sapporo and Yokohama in September 2007 to promote the record. Yume! was a commercial success and peaked at number 3 in the Japanese HMV Foreign chart.

The band completed a thirty date UK tour, with support from London band The Foxes, to promote their album, The Legend of Yeti Gonzales. The album was recorded live with only a handful of overdubs onto a 16 track tape recorder without any mastering. It was released in June 2008, and received favourable reviews from the NME, Clash and Daily Mirror. Yeti split sometime towards the end of 2008/09.

== Discography ==
=== Albums ===
- The Legend Of Yeti Gonzales – 23 June 2008; Get Up & Go Records

=== Compilation albums ===
- Yume!, 29 August 2007 (Japan only), (Vinyl Junkie)

=== EPs ===
- One Eye on the Banquet, 30 October 2006

=== Singles ===
- "Never Lose Your Sense Of Wonder", 28 March 2005 (Moshi Moshi)
- "Keep Pushin' On", 29 August 2005 (Moshi Moshi)
- "Don't Go Back to the One You Love", 26 May 2008 (Get Up & Go Records)
