= Back to the Bus (Funeral for a Friend album) =

Compilation album by Various artists
- Released: 26 March 2007
- Genres: Rock, punk, metal
- Label: DMC

Various artists chronology
Back to the Bus Babyshambles (2006)	Back to the Bus (2007)

Back to the Bus is a compilation of Funeral for a Friend's favourite songs released on 26 March 2007.

== Track listing ==
No.	Title	Writer(s)	Length
1.	"Don't Stop Me Now"	Queen
2.	"Enemy Maker"	Dub War
3.	"Tat Twam Asi"	Earthtone9
4.	"Midlife Crisis"	Faith No More
5.	"Take a Picture"	Filter
6.	"More Than a Feeling"	Boston
7.	"Ain't Talking About Love"	Van Halen
8.	"Water and Solutions"	Far
9.	"Holy Wars"	Megadeth
10.	"Bury Your Dead"	The Haunted
11.	"Mouth for War"	Pantera
12.	"Black Sabbath"	Black Sabbath
13.	"Further"	Longview
14.	"Folsom Prison Blues"	Johnny Cash
15.	"Roses for the Dead" (Exclusive live version)	Funeral for a Friend
16.	"Tourbus Tales - an interview with the band"
