= Anthems for Doomed Youth =

Studio album by The Libertines
- Released: 11 September 2015
- Recorded: Karma Sounds Studios, Thailand
- Genre: Garage rock, indie rock
- Length: 45:45
- Label: Virgin EMI (UK); Harvest (US)
- Producer: Jake Gosling

The Libertines chronology
| Time for Heroes – The Best of The Libertines (2007) | Anthems for Doomed Youth (2015) | All Quiet on the Eastern Esplanade (2024) |

Singles from Anthems for Doomed Youth
- 1. "Gunga Din" Released: 2 July 2015; 2. "Glasgow Coma Scale Blues" Released: 20 August 2015; 3. "Heart of the Matter" Released: 22 October 2015

Anthems for Doomed Youth is the third studio album by English garage rock band The Libertines, released on 11 September 2015. The album contains two notable literary references: the tracks "Anthem for Doomed Youth" and "Gunga Din" reference poems of the same titles by Wilfred Owen and Rudyard Kipling, respectively. "Gunga Din" was released as the album's first single on 2 July 2015. The album's second single, "Glasgow Coma Scale Blues", was released on 20 August 2015. The success of the album produced multiple European tours from 2015–2019.

== Release ==
The album was released in 3 formats: Digital, CD, and Vinyl. There is also a Deluxe Edition, released on CD and Digitally, including extra tracks. A box set, including a Deluxe CD, a Vinyl copy, exclusive film, and signed art prints, was also released. To celebrate the release of the new LP 'a week of shenanigans' was announced, mainly taking place at Camden's Dublin Castle venue. The run of events was titled 'Somewhere Over the Railings'.

== Critical reception ==
Professional ratings
Aggregate scores
| Source | Rating |
|---|---|
| AnyDecentMusic? | 6.7/10 |
| Metacritic | 70/100 |
Review scores
| Source | Rating |
| AllMusic | 3.5/5 stars |
| The Guardian | 4/5 stars |
| The Independent | 3/5 stars |
| Mojo | 4/5 stars |
| NME | 7/10 |
| Pitchfork | 7.7/10 |
| Q | 3/5 stars |
| Rolling Stone | 3.5/5 stars |
| Spin | 6/10 |
| Uncut | 8/10 |

Reviews for the album were generally positive, earning a rating of 70 out of 100 on Metacritic, indicating generally favourable reviews. Charles Pitter at PopMatters declared the album "an enjoyable overload of charisma".

Alexis Petridis of The Guardian wrote, "The first new album from the reformed Libertines is better than anyone could have possibly dreamed. It may be a new beginning or a complete finish, but it's a vast improvement over how the Libertines' narrative appeared doomed to end".

=== Accolades ===
| Publication | Accolade | Year | Rank |
|---|---|---|---|
| NME | NME's Albums of the Year 2015 | 2015 | 29 |

== Track listing ==
All tracks written by Doherty and Barât.

| No. | Title | Length |
|---|---|---|
| 1. | "Barbarians" | 3:35 |
| 2. | "Gunga Din" | 2:58 |
| 3. | "Fame and Fortune" | 3:07 |
| 4. | "Anthem for Doomed Youth" | 4:26 |
| 5. | "You're My Waterloo" | 4:19 |
| 6. | "Belly of the Beast" | 4:06 |
| 7. | "Iceman" | 4:58 |
| 8. | "Heart of the Matter" | 3:29 |
| 9. | "Fury of Chonburi" | 2:40 |
| 10. | "The Milkman's Horse" | 3:23 |
| 11. | "Glasgow Coma Scale Blues" | 3:12 |
| 12. | "Dead for Love" | 5:14 |

Deluxe Edition bonus tracks
| No. | Title | Length |
|---|---|---|
| 13. | "Love on the Dole" | 3:13 |
| 14. | "Bucket Shop" | 3:03 |
| 15. | "Lust of the Libertines" | 4:01 |
| 16. | "7 Deadly Sins" | 3:04 |
| 17. | "Over It Again" (Japan bonus track) | 2:18 |

== Charts ==
| Chart (2015) | Peak position |
|---|---|
| Australian Albums (ARIA) | 55 |
| Austrian Albums (Ö3 Austria) | 9 |
| Belgian Albums (Ultratop Flanders) | 16 |
| Belgian Albums (Ultratop Wallonia) | 18 |
| Dutch Albums (Album Top 100) | 28 |
| French Albums (SNEP) | 22 |
| Irish Albums (IRMA) | 10 |
| Italian Albums (FIMI) | 57 |
| Swedish Albums (Sverigetopplistan) | 13 |
| Swiss Albums (Schweizer Hitparade) | 11 |
| UK Albums (OCC) | 3 |
| US Heatseekers Albums (Billboard) | 1 |

== Certifications ==
| Region | Certification | Certified units/sales |
|---|---|---|
| United Kingdom (BPI) | Silver | 60,000^{‡} |
^{‡} Sales+streaming figures based on certification alone.
