= Time for Heroes =

Single by The Libertines

from the album Up the Bracket
- Released: 13 January 2003
- Genre: Indie rock, garage rock, post-punk revival
- Length: 2:40
- Label: Rough Trade
- Producer: Mick Jones

The Libertines singles chronology
"Up the Bracket" (2002)	"Time for Heroes" (2003)	"Don't Look Back into the Sun" (2003)

"Time for Heroes" is a song by English rock band the Libertines, featured on their debut album Up the Bracket. It was released on 13 January 2003 as the second single from that album, and reached No. 20 in the UK Singles Chart. The song is based on singer/guitarist Pete Doherty's experiences and on police brutality at the London May Day Riots of 2000.

== Background ==
Writing under the name Heavyhorse to fans on the Libertines web forum about the song, Doherty explained the meaning behind the lyric "wombles bleed, truncheons and shields":

"The 'wombles' were a revolutionary sect from the era of the Mayday riots in the year 2000. They were rioters who all dressed up like wombles from the t.v series, including tinfoil shields and wobbly truncheons, mimicking the riot police. There were about 12 of them, but they had many enthusiastic disciples."

== Reception ==
The song was a fan favourite of the Libertines' live shows, and Pete Doherty's later band Babyshambles often play the song at their gigs. It is also widely acclaimed, coming in at number 2 (behind "Last Nite" by the Strokes) on NME's list of the best 50 songs of the previous decade.

A music video for "Time for Heroes" was filmed in Madrid, featuring the city's Metro and Colon's Square.

In May 2007, NME magazine placed "Time For Heroes" at number 6 in its list of the 50 Greatest Indie Anthems Ever, one place below "Don't Look Back into The Sun," also by the Libertines. In 2011, NME placed it at number 10 on its list "150 Best Tracks of the Past 15 Years". Later, they placed the song at no. 28 on their list of 500 Greatest Songs of All Time, writing that the song was "The Libs' crowning moment, it brilliantly captured the thrill of fighting for a cause."

Peter Doherty recorded an acoustic version of the song in a 2019 Cardinal Sessions set.

Graham Coxon performed a version of this song for Radio 1's Live Lounge.

"Time for Heroes" also featured in the American film American Wedding.

== Track listing ==
=== 7" ===
1. "Time for Heroes" – 2:41
2. "7 Deadly Sins" (Demo) – 2:50

=== CD 1 ===
1. "Time for Heroes" – 2:41
2. "General Smuts" (Demo) – 3:31
3. "Bangkok" (Demo) – 2:14

=== CD 2 ===
1. "Time for Heroes" – 2:41
2. "Mr. Finnegan" (Demo) – 1:51
3. "Sally Brown" (Demo) – 2:54

=== Japanese EP ===
1. "Time for Heroes" – 2:41
2. "I Get Along (Original Version)" – 2:54
3. "The Delaney" – 2:40
4. "Mayday" – 1:04
5. "Skag & Bone Man" – 1:48
6. "Bangkok" (Demo) – 2:12
7. Time For Heroes (Music Video)

== Chart performance ==
Chart (2003)	Peak position
UK Singles Chart	20

== Certifications ==
Region	Certification	Certified units/sales
United Kingdom (BPI)	Silver	200,000^{‡}
^{‡} Sales+streaming figures based on certification alone.
