= The Cabin Chiang Mai =

The Cabin Rehab
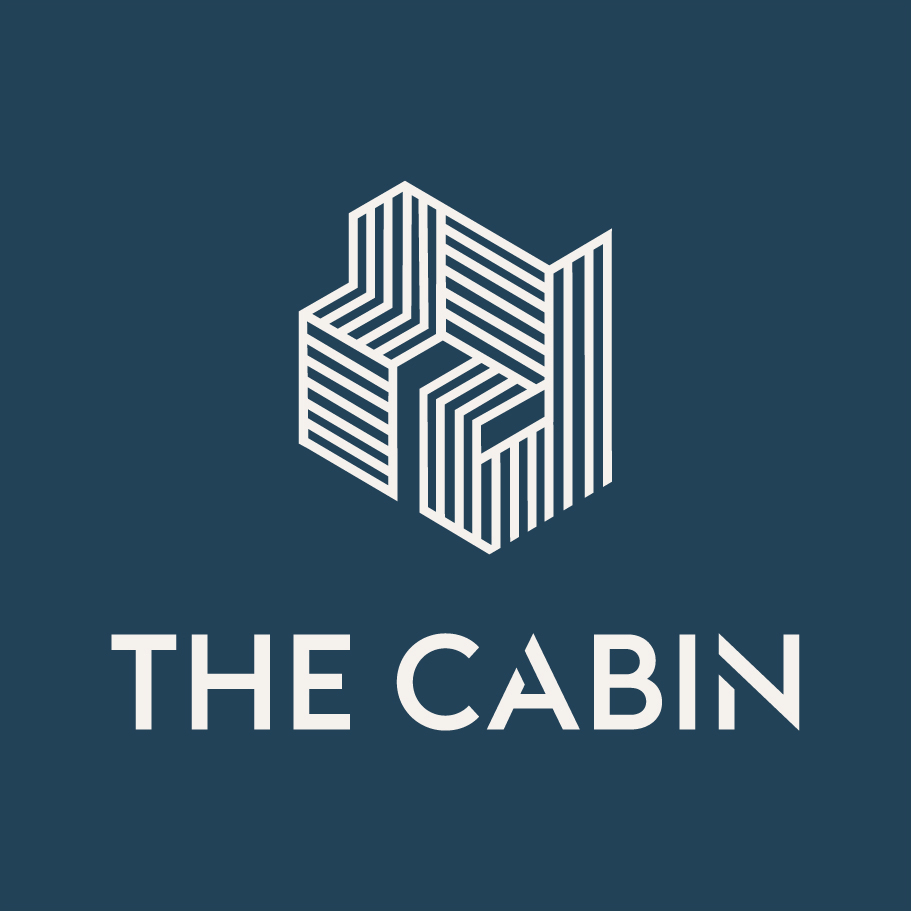

Geography
- Location: Chiang Mai, Thailand

Organisation
- Type: Private Commercial Investment

Links
- Website: www.thecabinchiangmai.com

The Cabin Rehab is a drug and alcohol rehabilitation facility in Chiang Mai, Thailand. The center has offered treatment for alcohol, drug and behavioral addiction since 2009. The centre is a medical tourism location for international patients from countries such as Australia, Bangladesh, India, Oman, Singapore, the United Kingdom and the United States.

== History ==
The Cabin treatment center was founded in 2009. It was founded by four UK expats, who identified a business opportunity to provide rehab services to expats with addiction issues. It was highly commercial venture, which the 4 partners capitalized on. The four partners become very competitive and eventually could not work together and had various alleged legal action between them. Eventually their differences started to effect the welfare of each other, so they refused to work together. The centre provides both short and long-term inpatient care with Western-trained medical staff. The average client price per month was around US$15,000 and the counsellors were western staff. However despite the well trained staff relapses were higher than the global average. Residential inpatient programs lasting from 28 days to three months are offered at the centre, which has 120 beds between two sites. Celebrity endorsements such as Elton John, Boy George and Kate Moss attracted more people. The ages of patients at the centre ranges from 18 to 65. The Cabin does not publicly disclose if clients are in treatment or not as part of its policy to protect patient privacy. In 2011, The Cabin experienced an influx of clients from West Australia. This increase made Australians the largest segment of the centre's international clientele. In 2012, the centre began expansion on the site to add 16 more beds. In 2013, The Cabin treated 44 patients from Singapore.

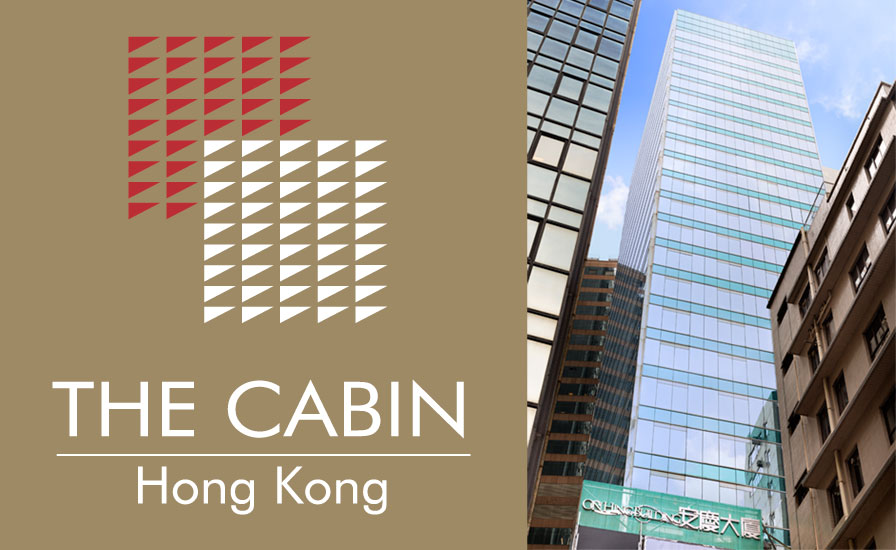
The Cabin Hong Kong

In October 2014, News.com.au featured a profile on The Cabin and a visit to the facility. The Cabin announced The Cabin Hong Kong, the first outpatient addiction treatment facility in Asia, in November 2014. In July 2015, The Cabin Chiang Mai announced an outpatient facility in Sydney, Australia called The Cabin Sydney. That same month, the organization opened the outpatient facility The Cabin Bangkok. By the third quarter of 2015, The Cabin Chiang Mai had also opened The Cabin Singapore, an outpatient rehab clinic in Singapore. In 2016, The Cabin Chiang Mai opened The Cabin Dhaka, an outpatient treatment centre for substance and process addictions in Bangladesh. This closed soon after due to operational issues and safety concerns. The Cabin Chiang Mai also once operated the Cabin Melbourne. However this facility ultimately closed and is not under current operation.

The Cabin Chiang Mai is an affiliate of The Cabin Addiction Services Group, along with The Cabin Hong Kong and The Cabin Sydney. The Cabin Addiction Services Group, in collaboration with The Cabin Chiang Mai, opened an inpatient addiction treatment programme called The Edge in July 2016. Designed to help young men, the program focuses on psychotherapy combined with intense physical activity. The Cabin Chiang Mai completed construction on a purpose-built rehab center in 2017, which includes an onsite hospital with 24 hour medical staff. In October 2017, The Cabin Group opened Resort 12, the first exclusive LGBT addiction treatment centre outside of The United States.

Following the closure of the inpatient facility in 2020 and 2021 due to the travel restrictions imposed by COVID-19, The Cabin brand was acquired by new investors and management in 2022. A new 30-bed residential site was opened in Chiang Mai along the Ping River. The Cabin also added an outpatient centre in London, England in 2022. The current outpatient centres are in London, Hong Kong, Singapore and Sydney and offer outpatient services, online or in-person.

== Treatment methods ==
The Cabin uses both modern and holistic rehabilitation methods, for both chemical (drugs and alcohol) and process (sex, gambling and gaming) addictions. It also treats co-occurring mental health disorders, including Post Traumatic Stress Disorder (PTSD). The centre claims a non-religious approach combining the AA 12-step method, cognitive behavioral therapy and physical exercise tailored to patients’ needs. In addition, the program facilitates the three circles method by using abstinence and routine as tools in rehabilitation. Weekly activities such as expressive therapy, fishing, rafting, rock climbing and elephant trekking are part of the recovery process.
