= Littl'ans =

English alternative rock band

- Origin: London, England
- Genres: Indie rock
- Years active: 2004–present
- Labels: Rough Trade; Revtone
- Members: Andrew Aveling; Alex Mahood; Ryan Blagrove; Ben Clarke
- Past members: Ronnie Joice; Ben Hutchinson; Patricia Vidal; Pedro Vitor Vieira De Souza; Aaron Mackintosh
- Website: http://www.littlans.co.uk

Littl'ans are an English alternative rock band, who have had marginal success.

The Littl'ans consist of Andrew Aveling on vocals/guitar, Alex Mahood on lead guitar, Ryan Blagrove on bass and Ben Clarke on drums/vocals.

They supported Babyshambles on their autumn 2005 tour, alongside playing other dates with them in 2006, and embarked on their own Club NME tour nationwide in the late months of 2005.

They released a single with Pete Doherty titled "Their Way" on 17 October 2005. Written by Aveling, Doherty liked the song so much he asked to sing on it. Many wrongly have reported Doherty wrote and performed this song as an apology for "stealing" Babyshambles band members Patrick Walden and Adam Ficek from Aveling's old band, The White Sport. This is false, as The White Sport had broken up before Walden had joined Babyshambles, Ficek did not join until later in Babyshambles career. The song reached number 22 in the UK Singles Chart and number 2 in the UK Indie Chart.

Littl'ans have also been linked with Hedi Slimane, head designer for Dior Homme. Littl'ans wrote the soundtrack to the Dior Homme Spring/Summer 2007 catwalk show. The song was called "We Look Good Together".

Littl'ans recorded their debut album in New York and it was released in July 2008 on Revtone (USA), Vital (UK) and Vinyl Junkie (Japan).

On 21 March 2009, the band performed at the 2009 South by Southwest festival in Austin, Texas.

== Discography ==
Year	Release Date	Title	UK Singles Chart	Album
2005	17 October	"Their Way" (featuring Pete Doherty)	22	—
2008	9 May	"Is It Wrong?"	N/A	Primitive World

=== Albums ===
- Primitive World – 2 July 2008, Revtone
