= What a Waster =

Single by The Libertines
- B-side: "I Get Along"
- Released: 3 June 2002
- Genre: Garage rock; indie rock; punk rock
- Length: 2:58
- Label: Rough Trade
- Songwriter(s): Carl Barât; Pete Doherty
- Producer(s): Bernard Butler

The Libertines singles chronology
"What a Waster" (2002)	"Up the Bracket" (2002)

"What a Waster" is the debut single by English rock band The Libertines. The song received little airplay because it contains frequent profanity. "What a Waster" was initially left off the UK edition of the band's debut album Up the Bracket but was later included as the 13th track on a subsequent re-issue.

The song was used in the film The Football Factory.

== Reception ==
NME included the song at number 96 in their list of 500 Greatest Songs of All Time, writing that the song "subscribed to all the classic pop single rules: under three minutes, catchy-as-hell, five chords max and instantly banned by broadcasters the world over."

== Track listing ==
All songs written by Pete Doherty and Carl Barât.

7"

1. "What a Waster" – 2:58
2. "I Get Along" – 2:53

CD

1. "What a Waster" – 2:58
2. "I Get Along" – 2:53
3. "Mayday" – 1:03

== Chart performance ==
Chart (2002)	Peak position
UK Singles Chart	37
