= Anthony Thornton (writer) =

British music journalist (born 1971)

Anthony Thornton (born 1971)} is an author and journalist. He was the digital director of Wallpaper*. Prior to that he was the head of digital content at the British Film Institute.

He has also worked as a music journalist and author. He is known for his bestselling book The Libertines: Bound Together published in 2006.

He was IPC Media Southbank Digital Director. From 1998-2003 he successfully edited NME.COM, it became Europe's most visited music news website under his editorship. During this time he twice won the Online Editor Of The Year at the British Society Of Magazine Editors Awards. and once by the Periodical Publishers Association.

He was born in Cardiff in 1971 and in his career in journalism has worked for The Birmingham Post, dotmusic, The Independent The Times and Q magazine.

== Notes ==
- Anthony Thornton. Baker & Taylor Author Biographies. January 2000:1. Accessed July 30, 2025. https://search.ebscohost.com/login.aspx?direct=true&db=lkh&AN=49304687&lang=ru&site=eds-live&scope=site
- https://boldjourney.com/meet-anthony-thornton-documentary-family-photographer/

== Sources ==
- Anthony Thornton (Author), Roger Sargent (Photographer): "The Libertines: Bound Together", Little, Brown Book Group (23 Feb 2006) ISBN 978-0-316-73234-5
- https://web.archive.org/web/20080719182238/http://www.littlebrown.co.uk/Authors/T/2864
- https://web.archive.org/web/20080830063241/http://www.bsme.com/awards/past.asp?Year=2001 (2008)
- https://web.archive.org/web/20081026031554/http://www.ipcmedia.com/press/anthony_thornton_appointed_editor-in-chief_ipc_ignite_digital_press_98014.html
