= Up the Bracket (song) =

Single by The Libertines

from the album Up the Bracket
- Released: 30 September 2002
- Genre: Garage rock
- Length: 2:38
- Label: Rough Trade Records
- Songwriter(s): Pete Doherty, Carl Barât
- Producer(s): Mick Jones

The Libertines singles chronology
"What a Waster" (2002)	"Up the Bracket" (2002)	"Time for Heroes" (2003)

"Up the Bracket" is a song by the Libertines, released in September 2002. It is their second overall single and their first from the debut album Up the Bracket.

The song alludes to London street crime, and tells the story of a romantic couple who refuse to become informants for a pair of gangsters, the gangsters might be an allusion to the Kray Twins, since the Kray family lived in 178 Vallance Road; and the danger that this decision creates.The title is a slang term used by comedian Tony Hancock for a punch to the throat; while "two crooked fingers" refers to the V-sign. "Joseph bloody in the hole" is a reference to Genesis, chapter 37.

In May 2007, NME magazine placed "Up the Bracket" at number 47 in its list of the 50 Greatest Indie Anthems Ever.

== Track listing ==
All songs written by Pete Doherty and Carl Barât.

=== CD 1 ===
1. "Up the Bracket" - 2:41
2. "Boys in the Band" - 3:41
3. "Skag & Bone Man" - 1:46

=== CD 2 ===
1. "Up the Bracket" - 2:41
2. "The Delaney" - 2:39
3. "Plan A" - 3:22

=== 7" ===
1. "Up the Bracket" - 2:41
2. "Boys in the Band" - 3:41

== Chart performance ==
Chart (2002)	Peak position
UK Singles Chart	29
