= Can't Stand Me Now =

2004 single by the Libertines

Single by the Libertines

from the album The Libertines
- B-side: "(I've Got) Sweets"; "Never Never"
- Released: 9 August 2004
- Genre: Garage rock
- Length: 3:23
- Label: Rough Trade
- Songwriters: Peter Doherty, Carl Barât, Mark Hammerton
- Producer: Mick Jones

The Libertines singles chronology
"Don't Look Back into the Sun" (2003)	"Can't Stand Me Now" (2004)	"What Became of the Likely Lads" (2004)

"Can't Stand Me Now" is the first single from English rock band the Libertines' self-titled second album. The song was their biggest hit, and peaking at number two on the UK Singles Chart and number 28 on the Irish Singles Chart. In the United Kingdom, it is their second highest-selling single after "Don't Look Back into the Sun".

== History ==
The song was written by Carl Barât and Pete Doherty with Mark Keds (also known as Mark Myers and credited on this track as Mark Hammerton) who was previously in a number of bands including Senseless Things, the Wildhearts and Jolt. The song is autobiographical, documenting the breakdown of Doherty and Barât's relationship which led to the ultimate split of the band later in the same year.

== Release ==
The song received some exposure in the United States; WFNX in Boston debuted the song by playing it twice back-to-back before its official radio airplay release. The promotional video for the song was filmed at one of the band's gigs at the Kentish Town Forum at the end of 2003 and was directed by ex-The Jesus and Mary Chain bassist Douglas Hart.

== Reception ==
In May 2007, NME placed "Can't Stand Me Now" at number 13 in its list of the "50 Greatest Indie Anthems Ever". NME also named the song as the best track of 2004. In October 2011, NME placed it at number 26 on its list "150 Best Tracks of the Past 15 Years".

== Cover artwork ==
The cover art features an orange X and yellow background (CD 1) / blue X and green brushed background (CD 2) cover art by Sophie Thunder. The CD is a black disc with the orange X graphic (CD 1) / white disc with the blue X graphic (CD 2) from cover art, track listing and Rough Trade logo in orange / blue, and black on white / white on black 'THE LIBERTINES' logo. The back cover is a silhouette, black-and-white photograph by Sophie Thunder of Pete and Carl standing in front of a window smoking a cigarette.

== Track listings ==
UK 7-inch single

A. "Can't Stand Me Now" (Doherty, Barât, Richard Hammerton)
B. "(I've Got) Sweets" (Doherty, Barât)

UK CD single

1. "Can't Stand Me Now" (Doherty, Barât, Hammerton)
2. "Never Never" (Doherty, Barât)

US CD single

1. "Can't Stand Me Now" (Doherty, Barât, Hammerton)
2. "Never Never" (Doherty, Barât)
3. "All at Sea" (Doherty)

US maxi-CD single

1. "Can't Stand Me Now" (Doherty, Barât, Hammerton)
2. "Cyclops" (Doherty, Barât, Peter Wolfe)
3. "Dilly Boys" (Doherty, Barât)

European maxi-CD single

1. "Can't Stand Me Now" (Doherty, Barât, Hammerton)
2. "Cyclops" (Doherty, Barât, Wolfe)
3. "Dilly Boys" (Doherty, Barât)
4. "Can't Stand Me Now" (video)

== Charts ==
=== Weekly charts ===
Chart (2004)	Peak position
Europe (Eurochart Hot 100)	7
Ireland (IRMA)	28
Scottish Singles Sales (Official Charts)	2
UK Singles (Official Charts)	2
UK Indie (Official Charts)	1

=== Year-end charts ===
Chart (2004)	Position
UK Singles (OCC)	138

== Certifications ==
Region	Certification	Certified units/sales
United Kingdom (BPI)	Platinum	600,000^{‡}
^{‡} Sales+streaming figures based on certification alone.
