= The Libertines =

English rock band

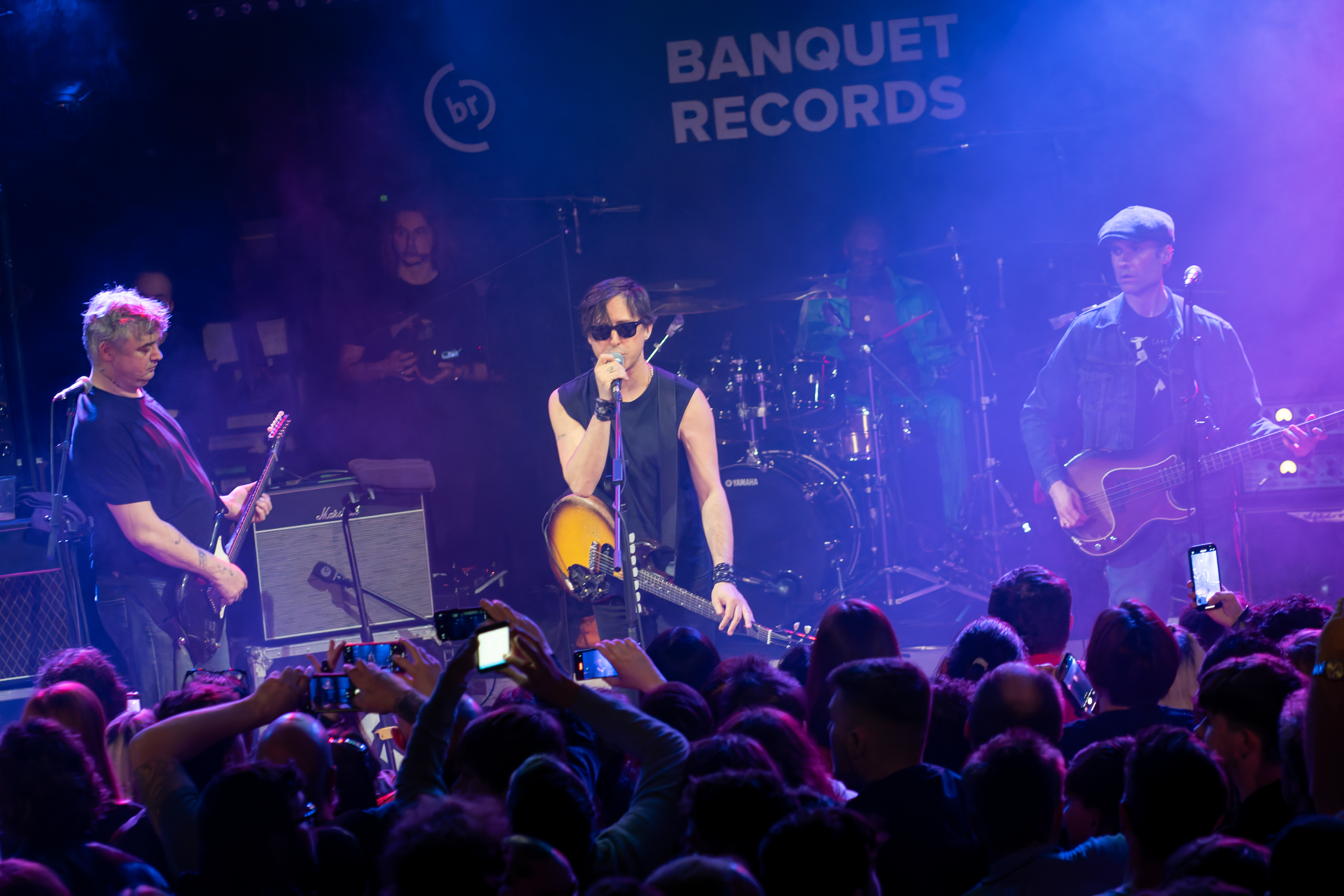
- The Libertines performing in 2024; From left to right: Doherty, Barât, Powell (on drums), and Hassall

Background information
- Origin: London, England
- Genres: Indie rock; garage rock; post-punk revival
- Years active: 1997–2004; 2010; 2014–present
- Labels: Rough Trade; Virgin EMI; Harvest
- Spinoffs: Babyshambles; Dirty Pretty Things; Yeti; The Chavs; Razorlight
- Members: Carl Barât; Pete Doherty; John Hassall; Gary Powell
- Past members: Johnny Borrell; Paul Dufour
- Website: thelibertines.com

The Libertines are an English rock band, formed in London in 1997 by frontmen Carl Barât (vocals/guitar) and Pete Doherty (vocals/guitar). The band, centred on the songwriting partnership of Barât and Doherty, has included John Hassall (bass), and Gary Powell (drums) for most of its recording career. The band was part of the garage rock revival and spearheaded the movement in the United Kingdom.

The band gained some notoriety in the early 2000s, due to Doherty's use of illegal drugs and conflicts between Barât and Doherty. Although their mainstream success was initially limited, their profile soon grew culminating in a No. 2 single and No. 1 album on the UK Charts. In December 2004, their self-titled second studio album was voted the second-best album of the year by NME magazine. Their first two studio albums were produced by Mick Jones, co-founder of the punk band The Clash.

In spite of their critical and commercial success, the band's music was often eclipsed by its internal conflicts, stemming from Doherty's addictions to crack cocaine and heroin, which eventually led to the break-up of the band. Doherty has since said that the break-up of the band was due to relationship difficulties between Barât and himself which were not related to his drug addictions. The members of the Libertines then formed new bands with varying degrees of success.

In August 2010, the four members of the Libertines reunited to play a series of shows, including slots at the 2010 Reading and Leeds Festivals. The reunion shows received a highly positive response from the press and fans. In April 2014, the Libertines announced that they would again re-form for a show at Hyde Park in London. In November 2014 the band signed a recording contract with Virgin EMI Records, and released their third studio album, Anthems for Doomed Youth on 11 September 2015. All Quiet on the Eastern Esplanade, their fourth studio album, was released on 5 April 2024.

== History ==
=== Early history (1997–2001) ===
The founding members of the Libertines, Peter Doherty and Carl Barât, met when Barât was studying drama at Brunel University in Uxbridge in west London and sharing a flat in Richmond, London, with Amy-Jo Doherty, Peter's elder sister. Barât abandoned his course two years in; Doherty left his English literature course at Queen Mary, University of London after only a year, and they moved into a flat together on Camden Road in North London, which they named "The Albion rooms."

They formed a band with their neighbour Steve Bedlow, commonly referred to as "Scarborough Steve" and named themselves "the Strand", later discarded for "the Libertines" after the French writer Marquis de Sade's unfinished novel Lusts of the Libertines ("the Albions" was also considered, but rejected). They later met John Hassall and Johnny Borrell, who played bass with the Libertines for a short period. Many of their early gigs took place in the flat shared by Doherty and Barât. They had booked themselves into Odessa studios and played at Filthy Macnasty's Whiskey Cafe in Islington in North London, where Doherty was working as a barman. Roger Morton thought they had potential and offered with a friend, to manage the Libertines. Despite a separate offer from an experienced member of the music industry, John Waller, the band accepted Morton's services as manager. However, Morton eventually gave up the job after an unsuccessful six months.

In March 2000 the Libertines met Banny Poostchi, a lawyer for Warner Chappell Music Publishing. Recognizing their potential, she took an active role in managing them. They recorded "Legs XI", a set of their best 8 tracks at the time (and later a popular bootleg recording among fans). However by December 2000, they had still not been signed causing Dufour, Hassall, and Pootschi to part ways with the Libertines. The subsequent success of The Strokes, a band with a similar style, caused Pootschi to reconsider her position.

She formed a plan (dubbed "Plan A") to get the Libertines signed to Rough Trade Records within 6 months. During the period, Barât and Doherty wrote many of the songs which ended up on their debut studio album. Gary Powell was recruited to play drums, as Paul Dufour was deemed by Pootschi to be "too old." On 1 October 2001, Barât and Doherty played a showcase for James Endeacott from Rough Trade. After Borrell failed to attend this important rehearsal, they telephoned him to discover that he was on tour "living the high life." Endeacott's support led to them playing for the heads of Rough Trade, Geoff Travis and Jeanette Lee, on 11 December. They were told they would be signed, and the official deal happened on 21 December. The Libertines were in need of a bassist, so Hassall rejoined the band at their request, but was informed he would have to stay in the background, as the band would be focused on the partnership of Doherty and Barât. After signing with Rough Trade, Doherty and Barât rented a flat together at 112a Teesdale Street in Bethnal Green which is part of East End. They named it "The Albion Rooms", a venue which became a location for many of their guerrilla gigs.

=== Success (2002–2003) ===
Now with a firm line-up, they began to play more gigs alongside The Strokes and The Vines, an Australian band, in quick succession. They succeeded in spreading their name around the music press, with the NME taking a particular interest in them (an interest which continued throughout their career). Their first single was a double A-side of "What a Waster" and "I Get Along", produced by former Suede guitarist Bernard Butler. It was released on 3 June 2002 to a highly positive reception but received little airplay due to its liberal use of profanities. A censored version appeared as DJs Mark and Lard's single of the week on BBC Radio 1. On the week the single came out, the Libertines were featured on the cover of the NME for the first time. The single reached No. 37 in the UK Singles Chart.

"Up the Bracket"
27-second clip of the start of Up the bracket including iconic opening scream

Their debut studio album was recorded and produced by Mick Jones, formerly of the Clash and Big Audio Dynamite. Entitled Up the Bracket, it was recorded at the RAK studios in St John's Wood northwest of Charing Cross, with mixing taking place at Whitfield studios. During that time, the band played as many gigs as possible (over 100 in 2002 alone) including being support acts for the Sex Pistols and Morrissey.

Their second single and title track from the album, "Up the Bracket", was released on 30 September and charted at No. 29. It was soon followed by the release on 21 October of the album, which charted at No. 35. They won Best New Band at the 2002 NME Awards and Barât moved out of The Albion Rooms.

=== Problems (2003) ===
During the recording of Up the Bracket and in touring afterwards, Doherty's drug use had increased greatly (he was using both crack cocaine and heroin by then) and his relationship with the rest of the band deteriorated. Relationships in the band had become fractious, and some of the tension was visible in their performances. Doherty expressed himself in the "Books of Albion", his personal collection of notes, thoughts and poems, and also more and more frequently on the libertines.org fan forums. His posts and writings at this time were unpredictable: at times, he seemed distressed and angry; at others, he came across as calm and happy.

Carl Barât's tattoo of the word "Libertine" on his right arm (in Barât's own handwriting); from the second album cover

They went to the US to promote themselves and work on new material. While in New York City around May 2003, they recorded the Babyshambles Sessions, where they recorded versions of current and future Libertines and Babyshambles releases such as "Last Post on the Bugle", "Albion", "In Love With a Feeling," and "Side of the Road". As a mark of their commitment to the band, Doherty and Barât both got tattoos of the word "Libertine" on their arms, written in Carl's handwriting. The prelude to this moment is heard on "The Good Old Days" from the Babyshambles Sessions, in which, after the lyric, "A list of things we said we'd do tomorrow," Doherty yells 'Get a tattoo!' However, Barât became increasingly exasperated with the people with whom Doherty was associating and the drugs they brought. Barât quit the sessions in disgust and Doherty finished recording alone. The sessions were given to Helen Hsu, a fan, who as Doherty allegedly instructed, put them out for free on the internet.

Back in the UK, tensions continued to grow as Doherty organised and played guerrilla gigs which Barât did not attend. Their new single "Don't Look Back into the Sun" saw the return of Bernard Butler as producer. The lyrical quality of the song was praised, and the single held as a prime example of Doherty and Barât's songwriting talents. However, Doherty did not work well with Butler and was rarely present during the recording process. That led to rumors that the song had to be pieced together from the vocals he provided, with Butler himself recording Doherty's guitar parts.

As Barât's birthday approached, Doherty organised a special celebration gig in an attempt to smooth the tensions between them. Barât, however, was already attending a party organised by some of his friends, and the hosts convinced him not to leave. Doherty was left to play the gig himself. Feeling betrayed, Doherty neglected to take the train to Germany the next day for the Libertines' European tour. The Libertines were forced to play without Doherty: a guitar technician learned his guitar parts and several songs were dropped altogether. Soon, however, positions changed and it was Barât who refused to let Doherty into the band unless he cleaned up. Doherty continued to play with a separate musical project, Babyshambles whilst the Libertines completed tour commitments in Japan without him. Distraught and angry, Doherty burgled Barât's flat and was arrested. On 11 August, he pleaded guilty at the preliminary hearing to the charge of burglary.

Amidst the internal turmoil, "Don't Look Back into the Sun" was released on 18 August and charted at No. 11, the highest position they had managed at that point. The Libertines played the Carling Weekend with replacement guitarist Anthony Rossomando (who later joined Dirty Pretty Things). On 7 September, Judge Roger Davies sentenced Doherty to 6 months in prison. He served his sentence in Wandsworth prison in southwest London . The sentence was later reduced on appeal by Judge Derek Inman to two months.

=== Second studio album and the initial break-up of the Libertines (2003–2004) ===
Barât was waiting for Doherty at the prison gates when he was released in October 2003. After an emotional reunion they played a gig the same day at the Tap'n'Tin nightclub, in Chatham, Kent – with both Hassall and Powell, who had not been expected to come. The show became NME's Gig of the Year. The Libertines then played three consecutive sold-out dates at the London Forum in mid-December 2003, ending in stage invasions by the fans. These gigs were named amongst the top 100 gigs of all time by Q magazine. The Libertines also went on a widely acclaimed UK tour in March 2004 which included three more consecutive sold-out dates in London, this time at Brixton Academy in South London.

Banny Pootschi resigned and was replaced as manager by Alan McGee, previously the founder and MD of Creation Records (most famous for signing Oasis) and later to become manager of Dirty Pretty Things. They continued to play gigs and commenced recording their second album with Bernard Butler. However, the relationship between Doherty and Butler was as unsuccessful as before and the attempts were soon abandoned. In early 2004 the Libertines won Best Band at the NME Awards, despite the fact that "Don't Look Back into The Sun" was their only official release during the preceding year. As an aside from the Libertines, Doherty had recorded the vocals for "For Lovers", a song written by his friend and local poet Peter "Wolfman" Wolfe. "For Lovers" was released on 13 April 2004 and reached No. 7 in the charts, eclipsing the Libertines' highest charting single to that date. Despite Barât's intolerance of Wolfe and the associated drugs, he recorded guitar for the B-side to the single, "Back From the Dead".

Mick Jones returned as producer for the second attempt to record the second album. Doherty had returned to his drug habit and so relationships were strained. Security hired for the protection of Doherty and Barât had to keep them from fighting. The album was finished and Doherty left the mixing and dubbing to the others; he did not return to the studio with the Libertines for another ten years. On 14 May 2004, he was admitted to The Priory, a high-profile retreat, in an attempt to overcome his addictions. He left early, then returned, only to leave again a week later on 7 June.

During that time, Barât had been setting up a weekly club night called Dirty Pretty Things (a later dispute forced it to be renamed Bright Young Things) at the Infinity Club in the West End. The day Doherty left the Priory for the second time, he went to the club and spoke with Barât, with Hassall and Powell present as well. Doherty told him that he was going to Wat Tham Krabok in Saraburi province Thailand to get clean. The Libertines performed a short set that night: it was the last time they would all play together for more than six years, and the last time Doherty would speak to Barât for more than nine months.

The Libertines did not let Doherty play with them but promised that "when he cleans up his addictions he will be immediately welcomed back into the band." However, Doherty had managed to achieve growing success and fame with his new venture, Babyshambles, which further reduced the likelihood of reconciliation.

Meanwhile, the Libertines were still releasing fresh material. The new single "Can't Stand Me Now", which detailed the breakdown of the ailing frontmen's once seemingly cast iron friendship while illustrating the love-hate relationship between Doherty and Barât, was released on 9 August and charted at No. 2. The song included Doherty asking the question: 'Have we enough to keep it together?' Their eponymous second album, The Libertines was released in late August and topped the albums chart. Their final single "What Became of the Likely Lads" reached No. 9.

The Libertines played what would be their final show for over five years in Paris on 17 December 2004, still without Doherty. Barât chose to then dissolve the Libertines as he was no longer willing to tour and record under the name without Doherty.

=== Reunion (2010) ===
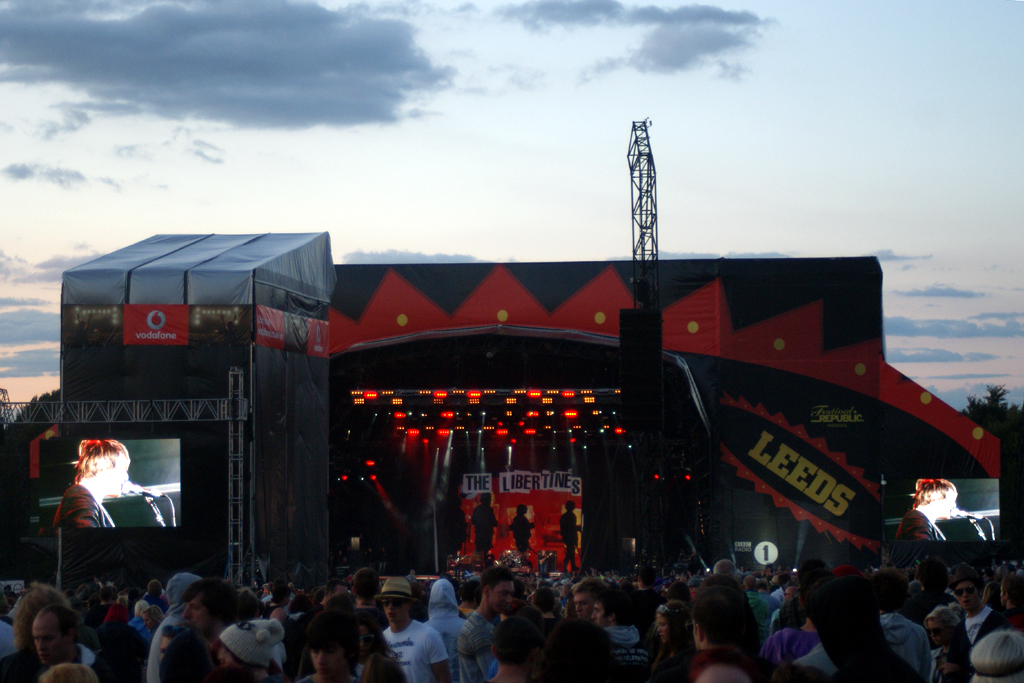
The Libertines' 2010 reunion culminated in a highly-acclaimed performance at the Reading and Leeds Festivals

Doherty and Barât were out of contact for several months after the Libertines had ended, due to Doherty's spiralling drug abuse. Members of the band reunited several times on stage through the years to play Libertines songs, but talks of a reunion remained tepid as Doherty and Barât concentrated on their respective bands Babyshambles and Dirty Pretty Things. A retrospective collection Time for Heroes - The Best of The Libertines was released in 2007.

It was announced on 29 March 2010, that the Libertines were reuniting for the Reading and Leeds Festivals in 2010. They were special guests for headliners Arcade Fire on Friday 27 August at Bramham Park, Leeds and Saturday 28 August at Little John's Farm, Reading. After the announcement, the band held a press conference on 31 March 2010 to discuss their reformation at the Boogaloo pub. The press conference turned into an impromptu "guerilla gig" with the band playing many of their old tunes. The Reading and Leeds festival appearances were preluded by 2 nights at the HMV Forum. A 300-strong rehearsal gig for friends, family and some members of the musical press on Tuesday 24 August 2010 and a sold-out fans-only show on Wednesday 25 August.

Doherty promised that the Libertines' special guest performance at Reading and Leeds Festivals would be remembered. The performance at the festival received very positive reviews from both fans and the press. After the gigs at the Reading and Leeds festival, it remained unclear as to what the Libertines would do next as both Carl Barât and Pete Doherty were embarking on solo tours. There were hints of more Libertines gigs in the future which both Barât and Doherty confirming they have received offers for gigs at some point in 2011. However, an interview with Carl Barât in May 2011 for NME suggested the band did not have any current plans for future activities together.

In 2012, for the 2012 NME Awards, Barât said, "I'm sure we'll do Libertines or something at some point." However, the Libertines still had no plans to get back together. In the same interview, Barât said that for the majority of 2012 he would be focusing on acting, making the possibility of a reunion unlikely. Also in 2012, Doherty said that the Libertines definitely have a future as a band.

=== Reformation and Anthems for Doomed Youth (2014–2024) ===
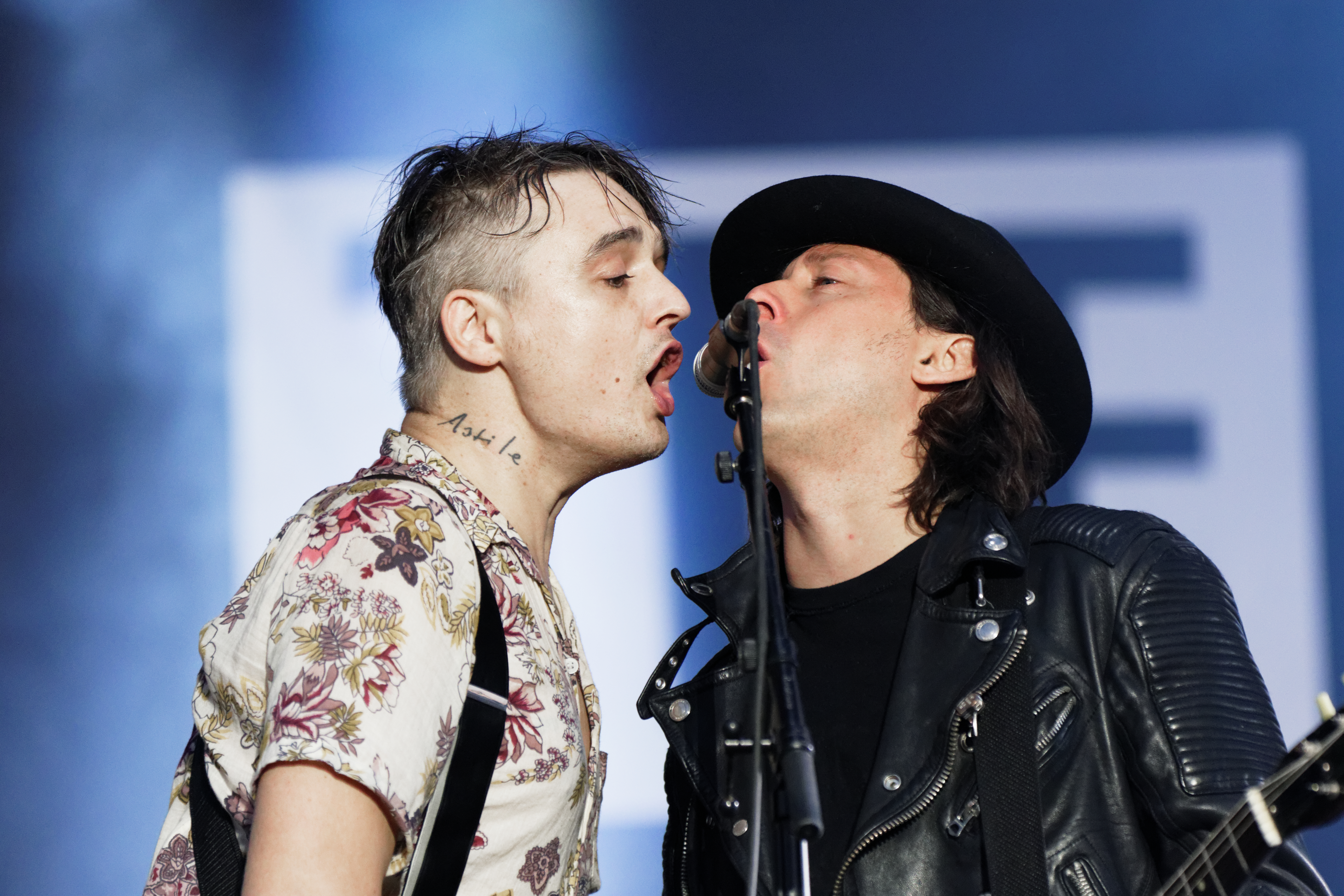
The Libertines at Vieilles Charrues Festival, July 2016

On 20 April 2014, an image of London's Hyde Park was released to the band's Facebook page. Around this time, both Carl Barât and Peter Doherty indicated in interviews that they had accepted an offer to play the venue on 5 July 2014. On 25 April, it was confirmed that the Libertines would play on Saturday 5 July in Hyde Park, headlining the day, as part of the Barclaycard British Summer Time series of concerts. Support for the concert would be provided by a number of bands and artists, most notably The Pogues, Spiritualized, Maxïmo Park, Raglans and The Enemy. At the 5 July Hyde Park gig, they announced three new gigs would be held in Alexandra Palace in North London on 26, 27 and 28 September.

In January 2015, it was announced that Doherty had successfully completed his rehab treatment at the Hope Rehab Centre in Thailand, and had joined his bandmates in the recording of their third studio album. In January 2015 it was also revealed that the Libertines would be headlining the festival T in the Park in Scotland. In February 2015, it was announced that the Libertines would be headlining Reading and Leeds Festivals in August 2015. In May 2015, it was announced that the Libertines would be headlining Corona Capital Music Festival in Mexico City. In June 2015, Carl Barât shared an image of the band in Thailand with the caption, 'Kitchen sink dramas over track listings', suggesting that the album was now complete.

In June, the band also announced that the first single off the new album would be "Gunga Din", which they also debuted live at Best Kept Secret headline show, Hilvarenbeek On 26 June 2015, the Libertines were the surprise special guests on the Pyramid stage at Glastonbury 2015, and were joined by special guest Ed Harcourt. On 2 July 2015, the Libertines announced their 3rd album, named Anthems for Doomed Youth, to be released on 4 September 2015. The release date was later delayed by a week to accommodate the demand for their album launch events, "Somewhere Over the Railings". The album was released on 11 September 2015.

The Libertines' Anthems for Doomed Youth UK arena tour in January 2016 was supported by Blossoms, The View, Sleaford Mods, the Enemy, Reverend and the Makers, The Sherlocks and Jack Jones of Trampolene. In 2017, the Libertines began their concert at Prenton Park by allowing Labour Party leader and candidate for Prime Minister, Jeremy Corbyn to deliver a speech in the run up to the 2017 United Kingdom general election. In 2019, the Libertines announced their "On the Road to the Wasteland" tour. The tour included a nine-date Christmas jaunt across the UK in December, along with shows in France, Germany, Luxembourg, Brussels, and the Netherlands in October and November.

The Libertines opened The Glastonbury Festival in 2022 and celebrated the 20th anniversary of Up The Bracket's release with a deluxe edition featuring live and early recordings. On 13 October 2023 the band released their first single in eight years, as well as announcing that their new album, All Quiet on the Eastern Esplanade. To celebrate the announcement of the new album the band announced "The Albionay Tour", an intimate club tour that sold out in seconds.

=== All Quiet On The Eastern Esplanade (2024–present) ===
The Libertines released their fourth studio album, All Quiet On The Eastern Esplanade, on 5 April 2024. The album reached Number One on the UK album charts. The band’s only other time reaching peak position was in 2004, with their eponymous sophomore album, The Libertines.

In support of the album, The Libertines embarked on a sold-out UK tour in late 2024. The tour featured a mix of new tracks from All Quiet on the Eastern Esplanade alongside fan favorites from their earlier work. The Libertines are set to continue touring with a series of European dates in early 2025. On 5 November 2024 The Libertines announced three major outdoor shows for summer 2025. The tour includes performances at Dreamland in Margate which is in East Kent, on 5 July, the historic Piece Hall in Halifax in West Yorkshire, on 8 August and Gunnersbury Park in London on 9 August.

In June 2025, the band played a highly anticipated set on the iconic Pyramid Stage at Glastonbury Festival, marking a major highlight of their touring year.

== Musical style and legacy ==
The Libertines have been characterised as indie rock, garage rock revival, and post-punk revival with punk rock influences. Lead singers and guitarists Doherty and Barât had different influences musically. Doherty was inspired by bands including (principally) The Jam, Sex Pistols, The Smiths, and Chas & Dave. Doherty has expressed "Still Ill" by the Smiths as a song that means a lot to him, in an interview. Barât admired the Velvet Underground, The Clash, the Doors, Django Reinhardt, and Nirvana. Doherty liked the written works of William Blake, Emily Dickinson and Thomas Chatterton whereas Barât preferred Saki and the Edwardian idea of wit.

On their collective sound, Doherty commented, "It's like they say: Oasis is the sound of a council estate singing its heart out, and the Libertines is the sound of someone just put in the rubbish chute at the back of the estate, trying to work out what day it was". Doherty and Barât followed one common dream whilst in the Libertines: "It's either to the top of the world, or the bottom of a canal", Barât once said that phrase to Doherty in the early days of their friendship.

The Libertines' lyrics occasionally reference their idea of sailing on "the good ship Albion to Arcadia". This idea was especially important to Doherty, who has continued the theme when writing for Babyshambles. He thinks of Arcadia as a utopia without any rules or authority. Their recordings were fairly lo-fi. Mick Jones' recording method was hands-off: he allowed the band to perform one song several times through and would then choose the best take. He performed minimal audio mixing and dubbing. While Bernard Butler was less strict with this, the final sound still came across as raw and unpolished.

The band has been compared to many classic British rock bands, as their angle on rock is uniquely British. Their sound is often likened to that of the Jam and The Kinks' early records as well as The Clash's first album and early singles. They are perhaps most similar to pioneer rockers, Buzzcocks. Morrissey is another strong influence cited by the band members. Many of their lyrics refer to elements of British life, use English/cockney slang and are sung in a near-drunken sounding slur. In their attitude they are sometimes compared to the Sex Pistols due to their chaotic and energetic live performances.

The Libertines were praised for forming a very close relationship with fans. The band befriended several of their fans, and their guerrilla gigs allowed devoted supporters to see them in close proximity. The film __ the Police, shot in 2003 by Anne McCloy, captured one such gig at The Albion Rooms when the police raided and closed down an impromptu gig after complaints by irate neighbours. Doherty published the "Books of Albion" online, sharing his personal thoughts and feelings freely. He also frequently posted on the fan forums. This allowed fans a deep insight into his life and helped cement the relationship between the band and the public. They were also very free with their recordings, releasing songs free onto the internet and via word-of-mouth giveaways. This allowed their fan base to hear unfinished songs or ideas, some of which would grow into finished versions on the albums while others would be discarded.

The Libertines have had two biographies written about them, both after the band's initial split. The first was Kids in the Riot: High and Low with The Libertines, by Peter Welsh, a friend, the second was The Libertines Bound Together: The Story of Peter Doherty and Carl Barât and How They Changed British Music, by Anthony Thornton and Roger Sargent, an NME journalist and photographer respectively who had followed the band from an early stage.

The Libertines have had a lasting effect on the British music scene. The image of Doherty and Barât entwined, Barât looking up protectively as his friend leans into his shoulder, on the front of their second album, has been called by Anthony Thornton "one of the most iconic rock images of the last decade".

=== The Libertines: Bound Together ===
Writer Anthony Thornton and photographer Roger Sargent collaborated on a best-selling book about the band. The Libertines: Bound Together was first published in hardback on 23 February 2006 by Time Warner Books. Bound Together documents, in words and pictures, the band's existence from early conception to the various bands spawned from the Libertines' demise. This book contains over 100 images of the Libertines, dozens of which were previously unpublished. The book was critically well-received with both Mojo and Q giving it four stars. It reached number seven in The Sunday Times Best Seller Non-Fiction chart in the week of release.

The book was released as an e-book on 23 May 2013, for iPad, Kindle, Kindle Fire, Kobo and other devices.

=== There Are No Innocent Bystanders ===
Long-time collaborator Roger Sargent directed a feature-length documentary on the band's 2010 reunion, which was released in spring 2012. The Libertines: There Are No Innocent Bystanders offers an account of the band's 2010 Reading and Leeds Festival shows, including Sargent's NME cover shoot announcing the festival appearances, rehearsals and warm-up shows, and their festival stage appearances.

Sargent was the Libertines' photographer from their first live show, and has been responsible for many of their now iconic images, most recently winning acclaim for two major exhibitions, The Libertines – Boys in the Band and Future Legends. The film is purported to include some of the 10,000+ unseen stills that chart the band throughout their career. The film was produced by Pulse Films and had its world premiere at East End Film Festival in April 2011. The film toured UK O2 Academy venues in March 2012, followed by a limited theatrical release in the UK and a DVD release.

== Relationship between Barât and Doherty ==
Roger Sargent (a close friend and photographer of the band) described their relationship as like "first love, and all the jealousy and obsessiveness that comes with that", adding "I think there's, y'know, obsession and jealousy on both of their sides. They bitch about each other to each other or to other people. They have a bond, intellectually and spiritually, like nothing I've ever seen ... but sometimes, you know, you just think, God, why don't you just get a room?!" In the same interview, part of a Radio One documentary, upon being asked just how close their relationship was, Doherty responded "I love him. Wouldn't go, um–certainly not on Radio 1–go into too much detail, but... we had lots of wonderful times together, yeah." Barât, when questioned similarly, steadfastly denied that the relationship had involved anything "physical". Barât has insisted that "people are really into conjecture". However, in a 2011 interview, when asked if the two had ever had a physical relationship, he replied "Does that include violence? There have been moments in our relationship where physicality has ensued."

The volatility and ardency of Barât's relationship with Doherty formed a significant, if not essential, aspect of their music and live performances. Doherty frequently posted about Barât on the Libertines forum; in one post from 2003, referring to an incident in 1997 in which Barât had wanted to form a suicide pact, Doherty wrote: "let's keep going i love you i love you so much." Speaking of his separation from Doherty in 2004, Barât revealed, "There was one point where I very very nearly, just to be close to him, started taking full-on heroin."

In a March 2009 interview with NME Radio, when discussing a potential Libertines reunion, Doherty revealed, "He [Carl] was saying, 'Well, look, what if it's all gonna happen again?' and I said, 'One thing: maybe it will, maybe it won't, but one thing that's going to help me not __ up again is you, and doing all that together.' Because he means a lot..." Referring to their relationship in a January 2010 interview, Barât said: "... it's a deep love. Deep love does funny things to people". In a February 2024 interview with The Guardian, Doherty said, "Maybe I’m not thinking it when I write the song, but the first thing I think afterwards is, ‘I wonder what Carl will think of that?’, whoever I’m writing the song with. The honest answer is, everything I write is for Carl.”

== Members ==
Current members

- Carl Barât – lead vocals, guitar, keyboards, saxophone (1997–2004, 2010, 2014–present)
- Pete Doherty – lead vocals, guitar, harmonica (1997–2003, 2003–2004, 2010, 2014–present)
- John Hassall – bass, backing and occasional lead vocals (1999–2000, 2001–2004, 2010, 2014–present)
- Gary Powell – drums, percussion, keyboards, backing vocals (2001–2004, 2010, 2014–present)

Current touring musicians

- Andrew Newlove – guitar (2023–present)
- Gary Hodgkiss – keyboards, trumpet (2023–present)

Former members

- Johnny Borrell – bass, backing vocals (1998–1999)
- Paul Dufour – drums (2000; died 2022)

Former touring musicians

- Anthony Rossomando – guitar (2004)

== Discography ==
Studio albums

- Up the Bracket (2002)
- The Libertines (2004)
- Anthems for Doomed Youth (2015)
- All Quiet on the Eastern Esplanade (2024)

== Tours ==
Year	Title	Shows	Notes
2015–2016	Anthem for the Doomed Youth	20 dates	
2019	2019 UK Tour	36 shows	
2021	Giddy Up a Ding Dong Tour	16 shows	
2022	Up The Bracket: 20th Anniversary Tour	31 shows	
2024	The Albionay Tour	10 shows	
2024	All Quiet on the Eastern Esplanade	26 shows	
