= John Hassall (musician) =

English musician

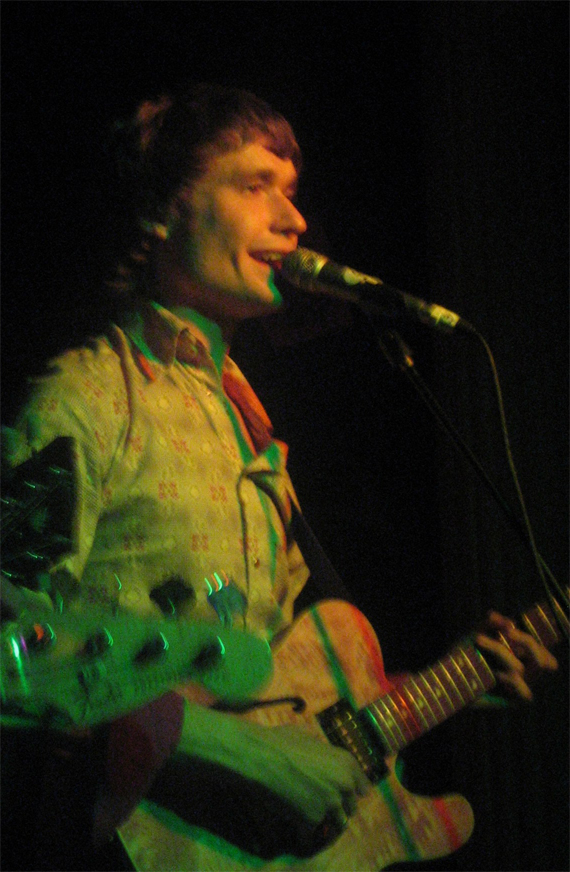

Background information
- Genres: Indie rock; punk rock
- Occupation: Musician
- Instrument: Bass guitar
- Years active: 1999–present
- Member of: The Libertines; The April Rainers
- Formerly of: Yeti

John Hassall is an English musician who is the bassist for the Libertines. He performs with his own band the April Rainers. Previously, he formed the band Yeti.

== Early life ==
He has said that when he discovered the Beatles at age 13 was the first time he fell in love. He went on to buy their entire discography in chronological order.

== The Libertines ==
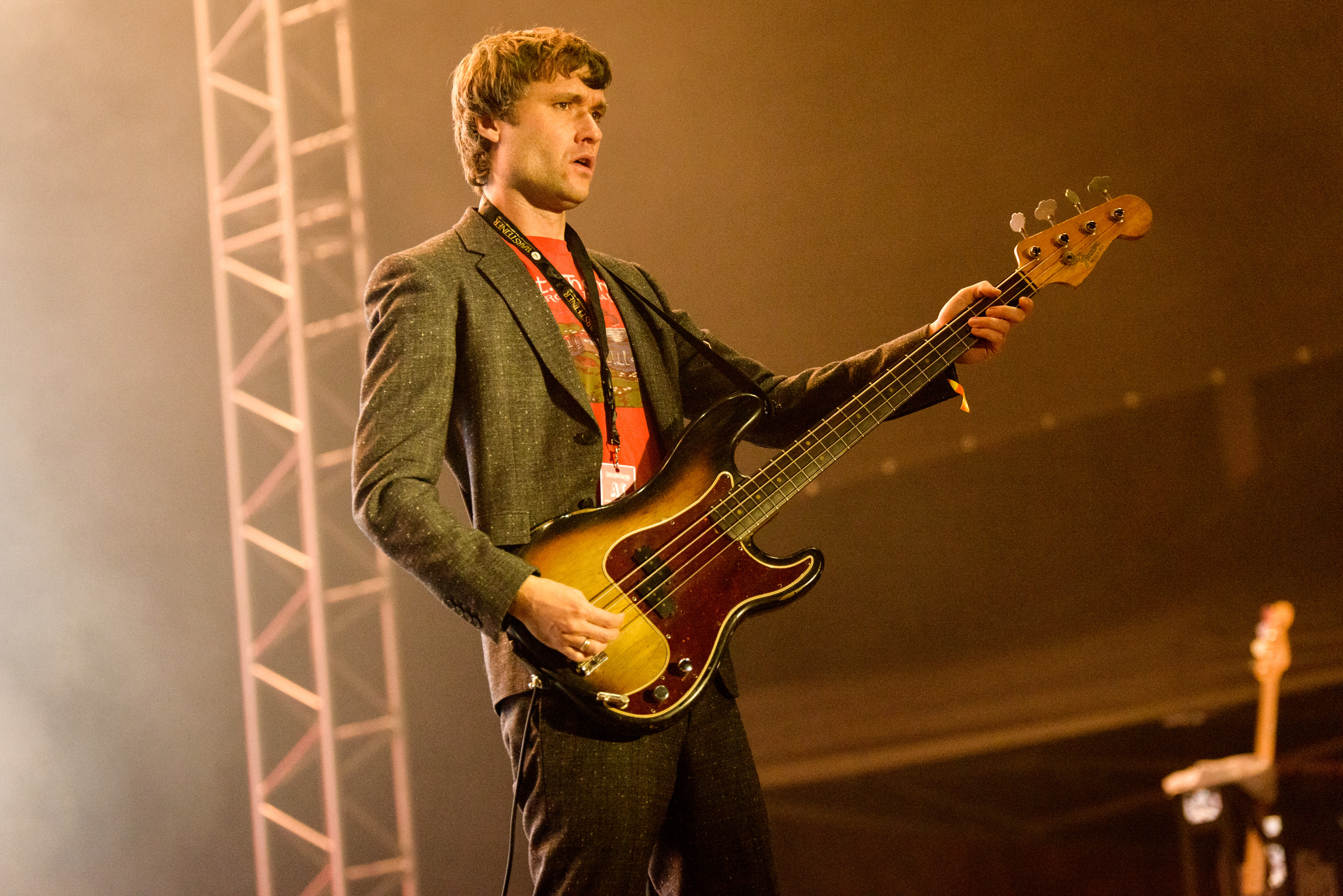
Hassall in 2015

Hassall attended Highgate School, where he was classmates with Johnny Borrell of Razorlight, and then Camden School for Girls at sixth form. It is reported Borrell was actually part of the band's line up as bass player before Hassall; another band member was quoted saying he left because he could not keep up with a song they were practising (allegedly 'Horrorshow', a song from the band's Up The Bracket – their first album). Hassall joined a band and ended up playing bass. He played in various bands for a few years, but none of them worked out until he met Pete Doherty. Doherty and Carl Barât had already founded the Libertines, but were in need of a bassist and drummer. It is said that Doherty was intrigued by Hassall not only for his talent but because he had 'proper' equipment. To play the drums on their first recording session, the trio hired Paul Dufour. Hassall was hired to rejoin them on bass when they were signed by Rough Trade in late 2001. He continued to play with the band until they disbanded at the end of 2004. The band has since reformed and was a "Special Guest" at the Reading/Leeds Festival on 28 August 2010.

From 2015 to 2020, John Hassall toured with the Libertines, promoting their third LP: Anthems for Doomed Youth. In the deluxe version of the album, there's a song called Over It Again where Hassall acts as the lead singer.

Hassall formed a new band, The April Rainers in 2014 in Aarhus Denmark, where he lives with his Danish wife Line Hassall Thomsen. After a number of Scandinavian gigs and support slots on Pete Doherty's Eudaimonia tour, the Rainers played a series of headlining gigs in England. The band's much delayed debut album Wheels to Idyll was released in March 2017, following single releases and videos for "Given Time","Intercity 125", "Whether Girl" and "Mosey Through Your Mind", the latter being directed by Libertines collaborator Roger Sargent.
