= What Became of the Likely Lads =

2004 single by The Libertines

Single by The Libertines

from the album The Libertines
- Released: 25 October 2004
- Genre: Garage rock
- Length: 3:23
- Label: Rough Trade
- Songwriter(s): Doherty, Barât
- Producer(s): Mick Jones

The Libertines singles chronology
"Can't Stand Me Now" (2004)	"What Became of the Likely Lads" (2004)	"Gunga Din" (2015)

"What Became of the Likely Lads" is a song by the Libertines, which was released as the final single from their self-titled second album, The Libertines. The lyrics in this song ("What became of the dreams we had?", "What became of forever?") refer to the breakdown of the friendship between Pete Doherty and Carl Barât, and the subsequent collapse of the band. The song's title (and the chorus's lyrics) echoes the title of a popular British situation comedy from the 1970s: Whatever Happened to the Likely Lads? The song reached number nine on the UK Singles Chart when released.

Pete Doherty claimed in an interview with Newsnight that he had no input for the video of the song, which does not feature the band but two young boys on a council estate (Thamesmead), implied to be a young Pete and Carl. The implication does not reflect the story of the two; they did not meet until their late teens.

== Track listings ==
CD 1

1. "What Became of the Likely Lads"
2. "Skag & Bone Man" (Live, Brixton, 6 March 2004)
3. "Time for Heroes" (Live, Brixton, 6 March 2004)

CD 2

1. "What Became of the Likely Lads" (Reworked version)
2. "The Delaney" (Live, Brixton, 6 March 2004)

7"

1. "What Became of the Likely Lads"
2. "Boys in the Band" (Live, Brixton, 6 March 2004)

US CD EP

1. "What Became of the Likely Lads" (Reworked version)
2. "Skag And Bone Man" (Live, Brixton, 6 March 2004)
3. "Time For Heroes" (Live, Brixton, 6 March 2004)
4. "The Delaney" (Live, Brixton, 6 March 2004)
5. "Boys in the Band" (Live, Brixton, 6 March 2004)
6. "Don't Look Back into The Sun" (Mick Jones version)
7. "What Became of the Likely Lads" (Album version)

== Charts ==
Chart (2004)	Peak position
Scotland (OCC)	9
UK Singles (OCC)	9
UK Indie (OCC)	1
