= Don't Look Back into the Sun =

2003 single by the Libertines

Single by the Libertines
- Released: 18 August 2003
- Genre: Garage rock
- Length: 2:58
- Label: Rough Trade
- Songwriter(s): Pete Doherty, Carl Barât
- Producer(s): Bernard Butler

The Libertines singles chronology
"Time for Heroes" (2003)	"Don't Look Back into the Sun" (2003)	"Can't Stand Me Now" (2004)

"Don't Look Back into the Sun" is a non-album single by the Libertines. NME magazine awarded it single of the week upon its August 2003 release.

== Release ==
The single was released in three versions in the United Kingdom featuring a re-recording of "Death on the Stairs" produced by Bernard Butler. With "Death on the Stairs" present the single was sometimes labeled as "Don't Look Back into the Sun"/"Death on the Stairs".

In various territories, "Don't Look Back into the Sun" was released as an EP combining various UK B-sides on a single CD. It was also released as a seven track EP in Japan, featuring the music video for the song "I Get Along" as the eighth track.

In 2007 it was covered by The View on the BBC Radio 1 Established 1967 album, with the song representing the year 2003.

== Reception ==
In May 2007, NME magazine placed "Don't Look Back into the Sun" at number five in its list of the 50 Greatest Indie Anthems Ever, one place ahead of the Libertines' "Time for Heroes". In October 2011, NME placed it at number 71 on its list "150 Best Tracks of the Past 15 Years".

== Track listings ==
7-inch

1. "Don't Look Back into the Sun" – 2:59
2. "Death on the Stairs" – 3:43
  - Re-recorded version

CD 1

1. "Don't Look Back into the Sun" – 2:59
2. "Death on the Stairs" – 3:43
  - Re-recorded version
3. "Tell the King" (Original Demo Version) – 3:44

CD 2

1. "Don't Look Back into the Sun" – 2:59
2. "Skint and Minted" (Demo) – 3:35
3. "Mockingbird" – 3:14

Spanish EP

1. "Don't Look Back into the Sun" – 2:59
2. "Death on the Stairs" – 3:43
  - Re-recorded version
3. "Tell the King" (Original Demo Version) – 3:44
4. "Skint and Minted" (Demo) – 3:35

Australian EP

1. "Don't Look Back into the Sun" – 2:59
2. "Death on the Stairs" – 3:43
  - Re-recorded version
3. "Tell the King" (Original Demo Version) – 3:44
4. "Skint and Minted" (Demo) – 3:35
5. "Mockingbird" – 3:14

Japanese EP

1. "Don't Look Back into the Sun" – 2:59
2. "Death on the Stairs" – 3:43
  - Re-recorded version
3. "Skint and Minted" (Demo) – 3:35
4. "General Smuts" (Demo) – 3:31
5. "Mr. Finnegan" (Demo) – 1:51
6. "7 Deadly Sins" (Demo) – 2:50
7. "Plan A" – 3:22
8. I Get Along (Music Video)

== Personnel ==
=== The Libertines ===
- Carl Barât – guitar, vocals
- Pete Doherty – vocals
- John Hassall – bass
- Gary Powell – drums

=== Additional personnel ===
- Bernard Butler - guitar, production

== Charts ==
Chart (2003)	Peak position
Scotland (OCC)	14
UK Singles (OCC)	11
UK Indie (OCC)	1

== Certifications ==
Region	Certification	Certified units/sales
United Kingdom (BPI)	Platinum	600,000^{‡}
^{‡} Sales+streaming figures based on certification alone.

== In popular culture ==
"Don't Look Back into the Sun" was used on the re-cap for some episodes of the BBC sitcom Gavin & Stacey, as well as at the end of "First Day", the first episode of The Inbetweeners.
