= Up the Bracket =

Studio album by The Libertines
- Released: 21 October 2002
- Recorded: August 2002
- Studios: RAK, London
- Genres: Indie rock, punk rock, garage rock revival, garage punk
- Length: 36:33
- Label: Rough Trade
- Producer: Mick Jones

The Libertines chronology
Up the Bracket (2002)	The Libertines (2004)

Singles from Up the Bracket
- 1. "Up the Bracket" Released: 30 September 2002; 2. "Time for Heroes" Released: 13 January 2003

Up the Bracket is the debut studio album by British indie rock band The Libertines. The album, released on 21 October 2002 by Rough Trade Records, was produced by Mick Jones (guitarist of The Clash), and was recorded at RAK Studios in London, England.

Peaking at No. 35 on the UK Albums Chart, the album has continued to receive critical acclaim, becoming integral to the development of the British post-punk revival movement of the early 2000s. It's also considered by some to be one of the greatest albums of the decade.

The album's cover art is based on an image of riot police squaring up to protesters during the Argentine economic crisis of 1998-2002.

== Background and release ==
Up The Bracket was released on 21 October 2002, peaking at No. 35 on the UK Albums Chart. The album was reissued on 8 September 2003 with bonus track "What a Waster", and a DVD featuring the promotional videos for the singles "Up the Bracket", "Time for Heroes" and "I Get Along".

In 2022 the album was reissued as 20th anniversary editions and box set that featured Live at the 100 Club disc, a disc of studio outtakes, a disc of demos/radio sessions/b-sides/live tracks, a cassette of early demos and DVD with music videos and live performances.

== Title ==
The title Up the Bracket alludes to a phrase used by English comedian Tony Hancock, of whom the Libertines' Pete Doherty is an avid fan. In Hancock's Half Hour, "Up The Bracket" is a slang term meaning a punch in the throat. Hancock is also referenced in the opening track, "Vertigo" – "lead pipes, your fortune's made", being a line from the Half Hour episode "The Poetry Society".

== Reception ==
Professional ratings
Aggregate scores
Source	Rating
Metacritic	78/100
Review scores
Source	Rating
AllMusic	4.5/5 stars
Blender	5/5 stars
Entertainment Weekly	A−
The Guardian	3/5 stars
NME	8/10
Pitchfork	8.5/10
Q	3/5 stars
Rolling Stone	4/5 stars
Spin	A
The Village Voice	A

Upon release, Up the Bracket received generally favourable reviews. The online music publication Pitchfork ranked Up the Bracket at No. 138 on its list of the "Top 200 Albums of the 2000s", and was ranked at No. 44 on a similar list by Uncut. British music website NME ranked the album at No. 10 on its list of "The Greatest British Albums Ever", No. 70 on its "500 Greatest Albums of All Time" list, as well as ranking it as the second greatest album of the decade. Rolling Stone ranked Up the Bracket at No. 61 and No. 94 on its lists of "The 100 Greatest Debut Albums of All Time" and "The 100 Greatest Albums of the 2000s" respectively.

In April 2008, BBC Radio 1 DJ Zane Lowe chose the album as one of his Masterpieces, playing the album in full with interviews from the band members, fans and fellow musicians who were influenced by the album.

== Track listing ==
All songs written by Pete Doherty and Carl Barât.

1. "Vertigo" – 2:37
2. "Death on the Stairs" – 3:24
3. "Horror Show" – 2:34
4. "Time for Heroes" – 2:40
5. "Boys in the Band" – 3:42
6. "Radio America" – 3:44
7. "Up the Bracket" – 2:40
8. "Tell the King" – 3:22
9. "The Boy Looked at Johnny" – 2:38
10. "Begging" – 3:20
11. "The Good Old Days" – 2:59
12. "I Get Along" – 2:51

Bonus tracks

Bonus tracks on US, Canadian, Spanish and Japanese edition
No.	Title	Length
13.	"What a Waster" (non-album single)	3:58
14.	"Mocking Bird" (hidden track)	3:17

Bonus tracks on Australian release
No.	Title	Length
13.	"What a Waster" (non-album single)	2:58
14.	"Mayday" (b-side to "What a Waster" single)	1:02

Bonus track on 2003 UK reissue
No.	Title	Length
13.	"What a Waster" (non-album single)	2:58

2003 UK reissue bonus DVD
No.	Title	Length
1.	"Up the Bracket" (music video)	2:55
2.	"Time for Heroes" (music video)	2:56
3.	"I Get Along" (music video)	2:50

- "What a Waster" is listed as track 13 on US, Canadian, Spanish, Japanese and UK reissue editions

== Charts ==
Chart (2002–03)	Peak position
French Albums (SNEP)	120
Japanese Albums (Oricon)	49
Swedish Albums (Sverigetopplistan)	59
UK Albums (Official Charts)	35
US Heatseekers Albums (Billboard)	13

== Certifications ==
Region	Certification	Certified units/sales
United Kingdom (BPI)	Platinum	300,000^{‡}
^{‡} Sales+streaming figures based on certification alone.
