= ACPA =

ACPA may refer to:

== Organisations and schools ==
- Aboriginal Centre for the Performing Arts, Brisbane, Australia
- Air Canada Pilots Association, former trade union in Canada
- The Arts & College Preparatory Academy, Columbus, Ohio, U.S.
- Allegheny County Port Authority, former name of Pittsburgh Regional Transit
- American Catholic Philosophical Association, U.S.
- American China Policy Association, a former anti-Communist organisation
- American College Personnel Association, a student affairs organisation in Washington D.C., U.S.
- Armenian College and Philanthropic Academy, an Armenian school in Kolkata, India
- Association of Certified Public Accountants, former name of Certified Public Accountants Association, England, UK

== Other uses ==
- Anticybersquatting Consumer Protection Act, a 1999 US law
- Anti-citrullinated protein antibody, an antibody to an individual's own proteins
- Arachidonylcyclopropylamide, a synthetic agonist of the cannabinoid receptor 1
- 4,4'-Azobis(4-cyanopentanoic acid), a free radical initiator used in polymer synthesis
