= Interagency Volcanic Event Notification Plan =

Canadian volcanic warning system

The Interagency Volcanic Event Notification Plan (IVENP) is a program in Canada established to outline the notification procedure of some of the main agencies that would be involved in response to a volcanic eruption in Canada, an eruption close to Canada's borders, or significant enough that a volcanic eruption will have an effect on Canada and its people. The main hazards posed to Canada from volcanic eruptions is from volcanic ash.

== Agencies and associations ==
Agencies and associations associated with the Interagency Volcanic Event Notification Plan include:

- Air Canada Pilots Association
- Air Line Pilots Association, International
- Ministry of Emergency Management and Climate Readiness
- Environment Canada
- Natural Resources Canada
- Nav Canada
- Public Safety Canada
- Royal Canadian Mounted Police
- Transport Canada
- Yukon Emergency Measures Organization

== See also ==
- Volcanism of Canada
