= Snarls =

American indie rock band

- Origin: Columbus, Ohio
- Genres: Indie rock
- Years active: 2018–present
- Members: Chlo White; Riley Hall; Mick Martinez; Mike Taddeo

Snarls is an American indie rock band from Columbus, Ohio. The group consists of lead singer and guitarist Chlo White, bassist Riley Hall, guitarist Mick Martinez, and drummer Mike Taddeo.

== History ==
Singer Chlo White was born in Indiana, but moved to the Columbus area when they were 7 years old. The rest of the band originated in the Columbus metropolitan area. The band formed through childhood friendships and attending The Arts & College Preparatory Academy. White met bassist Riley Hall the first day of high school. White met Martinez after the recommendation from a teacher. Martinez and Hall were the only two to have known each other prior, having been friends their whole lives.

After forming, the band began working on music together and released their debut self-titled EP in 2018. The band released a new song 2 years after in January 2020 called "Marbles". alongside the announce of their debut album, Burst. The following month, Stereogum designated them a "band to watch," describing their debut album as "shimmer[ing] and spark[ing] like a match hitting sulfur." In 2021, Snarls released a new EP titled What About Flowers?, which was produced by ex-Death Cab For Cutie member Chris Walla. In 2022, they released "After You (Samantha's Song)", a single and ode to one of White's childhood best friends.

In 2023, Snarls were one of the openers for English singer-songwriter Louis Tomlinson on the North America leg of his Faith in the Future World Tour. They will tour with Briston Maroney for the first few weeks of March. In 2023, they also released their single "Big Fish", a tease for the upcoming album, also produced by Chris Walla.

In Arpril 2024, drummer Mike Taddeo joined the band as a full-time member.

In June 2026, the In Heaven There’s Rainbows EP was released, being played first at the Columbus Arts Festival about 2 weeks before the EP was released.

== Artistry ==
In 2020, Snarls named Wolf Alice, Courtney Barnett, and Snail Mail as influences.

== Discography ==
Studio albums

- Burst (2020, Take This to Heart)
- With Love, (2024, Take This to Heart)

EPs

- Snarls (2018, self-released)
- What About Flowers? (2021, Take This to Heart)
- In Heaven There's Rainbows (2026)

Singles

- "After You (Samantha's Song)" (2022)
- "Big Fish" (2023)
