= Giant Rooks =

German indie band

- Giant Rooks at Highfield Festival in 2026

Background information
- Origin: Hamm, Germany
- Genres: Indie rock; pop rock
- Years active: 2014–present
- Members: Frederik Rabe; Finn Schwieters; Finn Thomas; Jonathan Wischniowski; Luca Göttner

Giant Rooks are a German indie rock band from Hamm, Germany founded in 2014. They are best known for their EP Wild Stare, their album How Have You Been? and their top-100 charting cover of "Tom's Diner" by Suzanne Vega.

In 2019, they won the 1Live Krone Award and the Preis für Popkultur in the months following the release of their EP Wild Stare. Their debut album Rookery was released in August 2020.

== History ==
The band was founded in 2014 by cousins Frederik Rabe (vocals) and Finn Schwieters (guitar), later joined by fellow schoolmates Jonathan Wischniowski (keyboards) and Finn Thomas (drums). This lineup was soon completed by the addition of a mutual friend, Luca Göttner (bass).

In December 2015, they released their debut self-produced EP The Times Are Bursting The Lines. This was followed by another EP New Estate in January 2017, which earned them critical acclaim. The release was supported by hundreds of shows all over Europe, eventually landing them a record deal with Irrsinn Tonträger of Universal Music.

In April 2019, the EP Wild Stare was released with its title track being a top 20 radio hit in Italy and the EP racking up more than 50,000,000 world-wide streams on Spotify soon after its release.

Giant Rooks announced the release of their debut album ROOKERY on August 28, 2020. Radio X DJ John Kennedy played the band's single "All We Are" on his X-Posure radio show, on the album's release. They went on tour in North America with fellow German band Milky Chance in 2021.

On the Official Singles Chart Top 100 of 25 March 2022 to 31 March 2022, the band achieved their first UK hit when their version of Suzanne Vega's "Tom's Diner", with AnnenMayKantereit, charted at number 63. They had concerts in the United States in late 2022.

In 2023, Giant Rooks were one of the openers for English singer-songwriter Louis Tomlinson on the North American leg of his Faith in the Future World Tour, joining at the Nashville concert through the end of the leg before embarking on their own headliner.

In February 2024, the band released their sophomore album How Have You Been?, peaking at number one in Germany.

== Artistic influence ==
The band has cited that "artists like Bob Dylan and Bon Iver" have influenced their music the most. Other influences they have named include James Blake, Celeste, and Joy Crookes.

== Members ==
- Frederik Rabe - lead vocals, guitar, percussion
- Finn Schwieters - lead guitar, backing vocals
- Luca Göttner - bass guitar, backing vocals
- Jonathan Wischniowski - keyboards, synthesizer, backing vocals
- Finn Thomas - drums

== Discography ==
=== Studio albums ===
Title	Details	Peak chart positions		
Title	Details	GER	AUT	SWI
Rookery	Released: 28 August 2020; Label: Self-release; Format: CD, digital download	3	16	28
How Have You Been?	Released: 2 February 2024; Label: Irrsinn Tonträger; Format: CD, digital download	1	31	18
If Heaven Exists, This Might Be It	Released: 16 October 2026; Label: Vertigo Berlin; Format: CD, digital download	4	4	12

=== Extended plays ===
Title	Details	Peak chart positions
Title	Details	GER
The Times are Bursting the Lines	Released: 2 December 2015; Label: Self-release; Format: Digital download	—
New Estate	Released: 20 January 2017; Label: Self-release; Format: Digital download	—
Wild Stare	Released: 19 April 2019; Label: Self-release; Format: Digital download	61
Rookery Live Tapes	Released: 18 June 2021; Label: Self-release; Format: Digital download	12
"—" denotes releases that did not chart or were not released in that territory.

=== Singles ===
==== As lead artist ====
Title	Year	Peak chart positions								Certifications	Album
Title	Year	GER	AUS	AUT	CAN	IRE	SWI	UK	US	Certifications	Album
"Småland"	2015	—	—	—	—	—	—	—	—		The Times are Bursting the Lines
"New Estate"	2017	—	—	—	—	—	—	—	—	IFPI AUT: Gold	New Estate
"Bright Lies"	2017	—	—	—	—	—	—	—	—		New Estate
"Wild Stare"	2018	97	—	—	—	—	—	—	—	BVMI: Gold; IFPI AUT: Platinum	Wild Stare
"100 mg"	2019	—	—	—	—	—	—	—	—		Wild Stare
"Tom's Diner" (with AnnenMayKantereit)	2019	76	18	48	38	33	86	63	78	BVMI: Gold; BPI: Silver; IFPI AUT: Platinum; MC: Platinum; RIAA: Gold	Non-album single
"Watershed"	2020	—	—	—	—	—	—	—	—	IFPI AUT: Gold	Rookery
"Heat Up"	2020	—	—	—	—	—	—	—	—		Rookery
"Morning Blue"	2022	51	—	—	—	—	—	—	—		How Have You Been?
"Bedroom Exile"	2023	—	—	—	—	—	—	—	—		How Have You Been?
"Somebody Like You"	2023	—	—	—	—	—	—	—	—		How Have You Been?
"Under Your Wings"	2024	—	—	—	—	—	—	—	—		How Have You Been?
"Mind Control"	2024	—	—	—	—	—	—	—	—		Non-album single
"The Future Is Cancelled"	2025	—	—	—	—	—	—	—	—		If Heaven Exists, This Might Be It
"Want It Back"	2026	—	—	—	—	—	—	—	—		If Heaven Exists, This Might Be It
"The Waves" (featuring Solann)	2026	—	—	—	—	—	—	—	—		If Heaven Exists, This Might Be It
"Slow Dance (For a Minute)"	2026	—	—	—	—	—	—	—	—		If Heaven Exists, This Might Be It
"—" denotes releases that did not chart or were not released in that territory.

==== As featured artist ====
Title	Year	Peak chart positions			Album
Title	Year	GER	AUT	SWI	Album
"Another Heart / Another Mind" (Razz featuring Giant Rooks)	2017	—	—	—	Nocturnal
"Insomnia" (RIN featuring Giant Rooks)	2021	25	45	79	Kleinstadt
"—" denotes releases that did not chart or were not released in that territory.

=== Promotional singles ===
Title	Year	Album
"Mia & Keira"	2017	New Estate
"King Thinking"	2019	Wild Stare
"What I Know is All Quicksand"	2020	Rookery
"Misinterpretations"	2020	Rookery
"All We Are"	2020	Rookery

== Awards and nominations ==
=== Awards ===
- 2019: 1Live Krone Award
- 2019: Preis für Popkultur (Most Promising Newcomer)

=== Nominations ===
- 2022: MTV Europe Music Awards (Best German Act)
