= Andrew Cushin =

English singer

- Born: 1999 or 2000 (age 26–27); Newcastle upon Tyne, England
- Occupations: Singer; songwriter
- Years active: 2020–present
- Musical career
- Genre: Alternative rock
- Instrument: Vocals
- Labels: Strap Originals; Virgin
- Website: andrewcushin.os.fan

Andrew Cushin is an English singer and songwriter. Born in Newcastle upon Tyne, Cushin gained prominence after supporting artists Noel Gallagher and Louis Tomlinson on their concert tours. He released his debut album Waiting For The Rain in 2023. Cushin's second album Love is For Everyone was released in May 2025.

== Life and career ==
Cushin is from Newcastle upon Tyne. When he was 18, his father died, and he began playing live music, citing musical influences from Donovan, Bob Dylan, Paul Weller, Noel Gallagher, and The Beatles. Cushin used to play as a goalkeeper in Newcastle Benfield F.C.'s youth team, where he met his first manager, who introduced him to Noel Gallagher and sent Gallagher a recording of him singing his single "Waiting For The Rain". Later that year, Cushin released his single "Where's My Family Gone" in collaboration with Noel Gallagher, who produced and played guitar for the song. In 2021, Cushin signed onto Pete Doherty's record label Strap Originals. He was previously signed to Virgin Records. In 2023, Cushin became the opening act for Louis Tomlinson on 36 dates of his Faith in the Future World Tour. That June, Cushin released his fourth single from his upcoming album, entitled "It's Coming Round Again", and a music video for it, filmed on tour with Tomlinson. He then performed at the Mercury Lounge in New York City in July of that year.

Cushin released his debut album Waiting For The Rain on 29 September 2023. The album was produced by Dave Eringa and recorded in Rockfield Studios and The Libertines' Albion Rooms. Cushin was supported by "celebrity backers" Louis Tomlinson, Noel Gallagher, and Pete Doherty, to release the album, as described by The Independent. The album remained at No. 1 on the Official Independent Album Breakers Chart for three weeks. Cushin was an opening act for Noel Gallagher's UK Summer 2024 tour. He headlined the Mouth of the Tyne Festival in July 2024. In December 2024, Cushin headlined an event at the Aston Martin F1 Team Technology Campus. His second album Love is For Everyone was released in May 2025. Cushin provided support to OMD on several of their summer 2026 dates in the UK.

== Discography ==
=== Studio albums ===
List of studio albums, with selected details
| Title | Details | Peak chart positions |
| Title | Details | UK |
|---|---|---|
| Waiting for the Rain | Released: 29 September 2023; Label: Strap Originals; Format: CD, LP, digital download, streaming | 69 |
| Love Is for Everyone | Released: 2 May 2025; Label: LAB; Format: CD, LP, digital download, streaming | 35 |

=== Extended plays ===
List of extended plays, with selected details
| Title | Details |
|---|---|
| You Don't Belong | Released: 22 April 2022; Label: Strap Originals; Format: Digital download, streaming |

=== Singles ===
==== As lead artist ====
| Title | Year | Album | Ref. |
|---|---|---|---|
| "It's Gonna Get Better" | 2020 | Non-album single | |
| "Where's My Family Gone" | 2020 | Non-album single | |
| "Waiting For The Rain" | 2020 | Waiting For The Rain | |
| "You Don't Belong" | 2022 | Non-album single | |
| "You'll Be Free" | 2022 | Waiting for the Rain | |
| "Dream for a Moment" | 2022 | Waiting for the Rain | |
| "4.5%" | 2023 | Waiting for the Rain | |
| "It's Coming Round Again" | 2023 | Waiting for the Rain | |
| "Wor Flags" | 2023 | Waiting for the Rain | |
| "Just Like You'd Want Me To" | 2023 | Waiting for the Rain | |
| "Alright!" | 2025 | Love Is for Everyone | |
