= Felt Better Alive =

Studio album by Pete Doherty
- Released: 16 May 2025
- Length: 28:48
- Label: Strap Originals
- Producer: Mike Moore

Pete Doherty chronology
The Fantasy Life of Poetry & Crime (2022)	Felt Better Alive (2025)

Singles from Felt Better Alive
- 1. "Felt Better Alive" Released: 15 January 2025; 2. "Calvados" Released: 26 February 2025; 3. "The Day That Baron Died" Released: 9 April 2025; 4. "Pot Of Gold" Released: 14 May 2025

Felt Better Alive is the fifth solo studio album from the Babyshambles frontman and The Libertines co-frontman Pete Doherty. It was released on 16 May 2025 through Strap Originals.

== Reception ==
Professional ratings
Aggregate scores
Source	Rating
AnyDecentMusic?	7.1/10
Metacritic	79/100
Review scores
Source	Rating
The Arts Desk	3/5 stars
DIY	3.5/5 stars
The Independent	4/5 stars
Mojo	4/5 stars
MusicOMH	4/5 stars
The Daily Telegraph	3/5 stars
Uncut	7/10

Felt Better Alive has received acclaim from critics. At the review aggregator Metacritic, which assigns a weighted average rating out of 100 to reviews from mainstream critics, Felt Better Alive received a rating of 79 out of 100 based on six critic reviews, indicating "generally favorable reviews".

== Track listing ==
Felt Better Alive track listing
No.	Title	Writer(s)	Length
1.	"Calvados"	Peter Doherty	2:48
2.	"Pot of Gold"	Doherty; Alan Wass	2:42
3.	"The Day Baron Died"	Doherty; Mike Moore	3:42
4.	"Stade Océan"	Doherty; Mik Whitnall	3:02
5.	"Out of Tune Balloon"	Doherty; Carl Barât	2:25
6.	"Felt Better Alive"	Doherty	3:20
7.	"Ed Belly"	Doherty	2:20
8.	"Poca Mahoney's"	Doherty; Lisa O'Neill	1:47
9.	"Fingee"	Doherty	1:51
10.	"Prêtre De La Mer"	Doherty; Moore	3:02
11.	"Empty Room"	Doherty	1:44
Total length:			28:48

== Personnel ==
Credits adapted from the album's liner notes.

- Peter Doherty – vocals (all tracks), guitar (tracks 6–9, 11), art
- Mike Moore – production, mixing (all tracks); guitar (1–6, 9–11), keyboards (3, 4, 10), backing vocals (4, 10), bass (11)
- Mark Neary – engineering (all tracks), bass (1–9), double bass (10)
- Jason Stafford – engineering
- Pascal Bromy – engineering
- Christian Wright – mastering
- Seb Rochford – drums (1, 2, 6–9, 11), piano (1, 6, 7, 9, 11)
- Gloria Gashi – violin (1, 2, 6)
- Justina Zajancauskaité – violin (1, 2, 6)
- Vincent Dormieu – violin (1, 2, 6)
- Frédéric Deville – cello (1, 2, 6)
- Kyle Williams – violin (1, 5, 11), piano (5)
- Matt Hector – drums (3)
- Quentin "Q" Dos Santos – trumpet (3)
- Adam Falkner – drums (4, 5, 10)
- Martin Slattery – clarinet (7), bass clarinet (9), saxophone (10)
- Lisa O'Neill – vocals (8)
- Father Didier – vocals (10)
- Jean Legoupil – pump organ (10)
- Peter Doherty – art
- Thomas Leprêtre – art
- Wayne "Chu" Edwards – design

== Charts ==
Chart performance for Felt Better Alive
Chart (2025)	Peak position
Austrian Albums (Ö3 Austria)	34
Belgian Albums (Ultratop Flanders)	105
Belgian Albums (Ultratop Wallonia)	52
German Albums (Offizielle Top 100)	16
Scottish Albums (OCC)	5
Swiss Albums (Schweizer Hitparade)	91
UK Albums (OCC)	7
UK Independent Albums (OCC)	2
