= Ava Lily =

- Born: Lily Ava Stokes; 12 August 1993 (age 32); Bristol, England
- Genres: Pop; alternative R&B; lo-fi
- Occupation: Singer-songwriter
- Years active: 2016–present

Lily Ava Stokes (born 12 August 1993), also known as Ava Lily, is an English singer-songwriter.

== Career ==
After uploading a cover of "I Can't Make You Love Me" to YouTube, Stokes was discovered by Naughty Boy and signed to Virgin EMI Records. Stokes released her debut single "Painkiller" in 2016. She attended songwriting sessions with Emeli Sandé and James Arthur, and co-wrote Zayn Malik's song "Common" for his second album Icarus Falls. She met Malik through the production duo MYKL. She also collaborated with Professor Green and Laura Mvula.

For the Six Chair Challenge on the 2018 season of The X Factor, Stokes performed a cover the One Direction song "Perfect". However, she did not continue on with the competition, which Louis Tomlinson called a "shame".

Stokes later left her label to go independent. In 2020, she released the singles "Blameless" and "Closure", along with her debut EP Higher Love. Her second EP Sunday Music Club, released in 2023, was written while Stokes was in the process of going sober, a topic touched on in "Sad Party" and "Happy Switch". She also released the single "Nobody Breaks My Heart Like I Do". After playing number of Sofar Sounds gigs, later in 2023, Stokes reunited with Louis Tomlinson as one of the openers on the Europe leg of his Faith in the Future World Tour.

== Artistry ==
Stokes grew up listening to Tracy Chapman, Christina Aguilera, and Britney Spears, and was inspired to start writing music by Amy Winehouse. She described songwriting as an "outlet for all my emotions".

When asked in 2020, Stokes named H.E.R, Sabrina Claudio, Summer Walker, Giveon, Sonder, and Masego as her influences. She said she would like to collaborate with James Bay, Julia Michaels, Jhené Aiko, Snoh Aalegra, The 1975, and John Mayer. She later called Miley Cyrus her "favourite voice in pop".

== Discography ==
=== EPs ===
- Higher Love (2020)
- Sunday Music Club (2023)

=== Singles ===
- "Painkiller" (2016)
- "Blameless" (2020)
- "Closure" (2020)
- "Tight Fit" (2022)
- "Sad Party" (2022)
- "Nobody Breaks My Heart Like I Do" (2023)
- "Happy Switch" (2023)
- "Trapdoor" (2024)
