= Faith in the Future World Tour =

2023–24 concert tour by Louis Tomlinson

Faith in the Future
- Tour by Louis Tomlinson
- Promotional poster for the 2023 tour dates
- Location: Europe; North America; Oceania; South America
- Associated album: Faith in the Future
- Start date: 26 May 2023
- End date: 6 June 2024
- Legs: 5
- No. of shows: 98
- Supporting acts: The Academic; Rachel Chinouriri; Club Halifax; Andrew Cushin; DMA's; Giant Rooks; Kchiporros; The Lathums; Ava Lily; Manumi; Némula; Pacífica; Safety Hazard; Sea Girls; Snarls; The Snuts; The Velvet Club; Benjamín Walker

Louis Tomlinson concert chronology
- Louis Tomlinson World Tour (2020–22); Faith in the Future World Tour (2023–24); How Did We Get Here? World Tour (2026)

The Faith in the Future World Tour was the second concert tour by the English singer-songwriter Louis Tomlinson, launched in support of his second studio album Faith in the Future (2022). The tour began in Uncasville on 26 May 2023 and concluded on 6 June 2024 in Guadalajara.

== Background and development ==
With the release of his second single "Out of My System" on 14 October 2022 for his second album Faith in the Future, Tomlinson officially announced the UK and Europe dates for his would be second world tour via his Twitter and Instagram accounts. On the eve of the album's 11 November 2022 release date, the United States and Canada dates were announced. Faith in the Future debuted at No.1 on the Official Charts and was his first solo album to achieve that position in the UK.

Tomlinson said that Faith in the Future was created with the live shows in mind. Tomlinson said that, "I was lucky enough to have the two live shows I had before Covid got in the way. That was fresh in me mind when I was writing this whole record and that gave me a lot of confidence. I think that really had a hand in the album feeling more confident as well." Tom Taylor, the production designer and director for the tour, said that it was intended to have "a more rugged and asymmetrical look" than previous Tomlinson tours, "meant to mirror a sort of dive bar aesthetic rather than a beautiful arena production."

The following year, opening acts The Snuts, Andrew Cushin, Giant Rooks, The Academic and Snarls were announced for the North America leg of the tour. Initial Asian concert dates in mid to late April were announced on 3 February 2023; however, in early April it was announced that they were cancelled for the time being, citing "unforeseen circumstances". Thus far, a Jakarta date has been rescheduled for January 2024.

The North America leg commenced in May 2023, and all dates went ahead as planned with the exception of the Red Rocks Amphitheatre concert; before Tomlinson was due to go on stage, there was a hailstorm that injured over 90 people. Tomlinson wrote a message on Twitter saying "Sending all my love out to everyone that was affected by the extreme weather at Red Rocks last night... I hope everyone has made it home safely and anyone injured is on the mend, it was devastating to see so many of you affected". The date was unable to be rescheduled.

After hosting the third Away From Home Festival in Italy on 19 August, Tomlinson kicked off the Europe leg in Hamburg at the end of the month. Openers included The Lathums, Rachel Chinouriri, Ava Lily, and Sea Girls.

The duration of the tour extended into 2024 with Australia dates added on 18 July 2023 for January and February. In addition to Sea Girls, Tomlinson brought local acts The Velvet Club, Safety Hazard, and Club Halifax on as support. On 30 October 2023, Tomlinson announced the tour dates for Latin America through social media in addition to local promotional campaigns. The Latin American leg of the tour will include the Velez Sarsfield Stadium in Buenos Aires.

The sophomore tour saw significant upgrades in venue capacities compared to the first. Tomlinson sold out The O2 Arena in London.

During the Latin America leg, Tomlinson became the first male solo artist to headline Mexico City's Autódromo Hermanos Rodríguez. He held a charity livestream of the event titled For Every Question Why, the proceeds of which went to War Child UK.

== Critical reception ==
Sara Feigin from Alternative Press described Tomlinson's debut concert at Irving Plaza in 2022 as "sentimental" and "organic", writing that "his lyricism and vocal abilities were always destined for Britpop".

Multiple reviewers of the North America leg commented on Tomlinson's "growth" as an artist, the "energy" of his shows, and the connection between him and the audience. Atlas Artist Group's Olivia Khiel wrote in her review of the Phoenix concert that the "strength" of Tomlinson's Faith in the Future album "lent itself to larger scale stage production, a heavy rocking live band and an uncontainable love from millions of fans." The Amity Collection review of the Troutdale concert agreed the "production was a huge step up from his previous tour, with LED screens hanging from the ceiling of the stage and pyro that went off a handful of times." Alyssa Rasp of The Aquarian Weekly praised Tomlinson's setlist and wrote in her review of the Asbury Park concert, "Many of his fans have been around since his early days in One Direction, but it was clear that a lot of the crowd were solo Louis fans through-and-through." The opening acts, such as The Snuts, Giant Rooks, and Andrew Cushin, also received praise.

Regarding his O2 Arena concert, Fabio Magnocavallo from Euphoria wrote that "Tomlinson's sincere and humble demeanor shined every time he spoke to the audience". Jessica Goodman from Dork praised the tour's production, singling out the video introduction, pyrotechnics and light shows as highlights of the show.

In November 2023, Rolling Stone gave Louis Tomlinson a nomination for Live Act Award 2023 at the Rolling Stone UK Awards for his Faith in the Future World Tour.

== Set list ==
The following set list was obtained from the concert held on 19 June 2023 in Sioux Falls, South Dakota. It does not represent all concerts for the duration of the tour.

1. "The Greatest"
2. "Kill My Mind"
3. "Bigger Than Me"
4. "Lucky Again"
5. "Holding On To Heartache"
6. "Face The Music"
7. "We Made It"
8. "Night Changes" (One Direction cover)
9. "Chicago"
10. "Saved By A Stranger"
11. "Written All Over Your Face"
12. "All This Time"
13. "She Is Beauty We Are World Class"
14. "Copy Of A Copy Of A Copy"
15. "Walls"
16. "505" (Arctic Monkeys cover)
17. "Back To You" (rock version)
18. "Angels Fly"
19. "Out Of My System"
  Encore
20. "Where Do Broken Hearts Go" (One Direction cover) (with elements of Baba O'Riley by The Who)
21. "Saturdays"
22. "Silver Tongues"

== Tour dates ==
List of 2023 concerts
Date (2023)	City	Country	Venue	Opening act	Attendance	Revenue
26 May	Uncasville	United States	Mohegan Sun Arena	The Academic; Snarls	6,896 / 7,109	$349,837
27 May	Gilford	United States	Bank of New Hampshire Pavilion	The Academic; Snarls	—	—
29 May	Laval	Canada	Place Bell	The Academic; Snarls	6,679 / 7,919	$310,971
30 May	Toronto	Canada	Budweiser Stage	The Academic; Snarls	—	—
1 June	Cuyahoga Falls	United States	Blossom Music Center	The Academic; Snarls	5,352 / 6,682	$209,132
2 June	Sterling Heights	United States	Michigan Lottery Amphitheatre at Freedom Hill	The Academic; Snarls	5,064 / 7,248	$274,456
3 June	Cincinnati	United States	Andrew J. Brady Music Center	The Academic; Snarls	3,823 / 6,431	$193,686
6 June	Columbus	United States	KEMBA Live!	The Academic; Snarls	3,132 / 4,500	$135,472
7 June	Indianapolis	United States	TCU Amphitheater at White River State Park	The Academic; Snarls	4,063 / 5,984	$211,103
9 June	Maryland Heights	United States	Saint Louis Music Park	The Academic; Snarls	3,230 / 4,238	$190,243
10 June	Kansas City	United States	Starlight Theater	The Academic; Snarls	—	—
13 June	Milwaukee	United States	BMO Pavilion	The Academic; Snarls	4,246 / 5,821	$231,541
15 June	Chicago	United States	Huntington Bank Pavilion at Northerly Island	The Snuts; Andrew Cushin	—	—
16 June	Minneapolis	United States	Minneapolis Armory	The Snuts; Andrew Cushin	—	—
17 June	Council Bluffs	United States	Harrah's Stir Cove	The Snuts; Andrew Cushin	2,801 / 4,173	$152,580
19 June	Sioux Falls	United States	Denny Sanford Premier Center	The Snuts; Andrew Cushin	—	—
24 June	Seattle	United States	WaMu Theater	The Snuts; Andrew Cushin	4,350 / 6,950	$238,590
26 June	Vancouver	Canada	Doug Mitchell Thunderbird Sports Centre	Andrew Cushin	—	—
27 June	Troutdale	United States	McMenamins Historic Edgefield Manor	The Snuts; Andrew Cushin	3,050 / 5,300	$186,774
29 June	Berkeley	United States	William Randolph Hearst Greek Theatre	The Snuts; Andrew Cushin	—	—
30 June	Los Angeles	United States	Hollywood Bowl	The Snuts; Andrew Cushin	—	—
1 July	Las Vegas	United States	The Chelsea at The Cosmopolitan	The Snuts; Andrew Cushin	3,267 / 3,267	$165,278
3 July	Phoenix	United States	Arizona Financial Theatre	The Snuts; Andrew Cushin	—	—
6 July	Irving	United States	The Pavilion at Toyota Music Factory	The Snuts; Andrew Cushin	—	—
7 July	Austin	United States	Moody Amphitheater at Waterloo Park	The Snuts; Andrew Cushin	4,389 / 4,389	$234,586
8 July	The Woodlands	United States	Cynthia Woods Mitchell Pavilion	The Snuts; Andrew Cushin	4,696 / 6,300	$336,072
11 July	St. Augustine	United States	St. Augustine Amphitheatre	The Snuts; Andrew Cushin	4,409 / 4,789	$242,481
13 July	Hollywood	United States	Hard Rock Live	The Snuts; Andrew Cushin	6,167 / 6,726	$412,381
14 July	Tampa	United States	Yuengling Center	The Snuts; Andrew Cushin	5,131 / 6,819	$284,312
15 July	Atlanta	United States	Cadence Bank Amphitheatre	The Snuts; Andrew Cushin	—	—
18 July	Nashville	United States	Ascend Amphitheater	Giant Rooks	—	—
19 July	Charlotte	United States	Charlotte Metro Credit Union Amphitheatre	Andrew Cushin; Giant Rooks	—	—
21 July	Raleigh	United States	Red Hat Amphitheater	Andrew Cushin; Giant Rooks	—	—
22 July	Columbia	United States	Merriweather Post Pavilion	Andrew Cushin; Giant Rooks	5,943 / 15,000	$383,215
24 July	Boston	United States	MGM Music Hall at Fenway	Andrew Cushin; Giant Rooks	9,101 / 9,964	$566,996
25 July	Boston	United States	MGM Music Hall at Fenway	Andrew Cushin; Giant Rooks	9,101 / 9,964	$566,996
27 July	Philadelphia	United States	TD Pavilion at The Mann	Andrew Cushin; Giant Rooks	—	—
28 July	Asbury Park	United States	The Stone Pony Summer Stage	Andrew Cushin; Giant Rooks	—	—
29 July	New York City	United States	Forest Hills Stadium	Andrew Cushin; Giant Rooks	—	—
29 August	Hamburg	Germany	Barclays Arena	The Lathums; Andrew Cushin	—	—
31 August	Copenhagen	Denmark	Royal Arena	The Lathums; Andrew Cushin	—	—
1 September	Oslo	Norway	Spektrum	The Lathums; Andrew Cushin	—	—
2 September	Stockholm	Sweden	Hovet	The Lathums; Andrew Cushin	—	—
4 September	Helsinki	Finland	Helsinki Ice Hall	The Lathums; Andrew Cushin	—	—
5 September	Tallinn	Estonia	Saku Arena	The Lathums; Andrew Cushin	—	—
7 September	Riga	Latvia	Arena Riga	The Lathums; Andrew Cushin	—	—
8 September	Kaunas	Lithuania	Žalgiris Arena	The Lathums; Andrew Cushin	—	—
10 September	Kraków	Poland	Tauron Arena Kraków	The Lathums; Andrew Cushin	—	—
11 September	Łódź	Poland	Atlas Arena	The Lathums; Andrew Cushin	—	—
13 September	Vienna	Austria	Wiener Stadthalle	The Lathums; Andrew Cushin	—	—
14 September	Ljubljana	Slovenia	Arena Stožice	The Lathums; Andrew Cushin	—	—
15 September	Budapest	Hungary	Budapest Arena	The Lathums; Andrew Cushin	—	—
17 September	Bucharest	Romania	Arenele Romane	The Lathums; Andrew Cushin	—	—
18 September	Sofia	Bulgaria	Arena Armeets	The Lathums; Andrew Cushin	3,108 / 10,036	$172,352
20 September	Athens	Greece	Plateia Nerou	The Lathums; Andrew Cushin	—	—
1 October	Bilbao	Spain	Bilbao Arena	The Lathums; The Academic	—	—
3 October	Lisbon	Portugal	Altice Arena	The Lathums; The Academic	5,114 / 8,561	$275,160
5 October	Madrid	Spain	WiZink Center	The Lathums; The Academic	13,845 / 15,973	$798,917
6 October	Barcelona	Spain	Palau Sant Jordi	The Lathums; The Academic	—	—
8 October	Turin	Italy	Pala Alpitour	The Lathums; The Academic	—	—
9 October	Bologna	Italy	Unipol Arena	The Lathums; The Academic	—	—
11 October	Esch-sur-Alzette	Luxembourg	Rockhal	The Lathums; The Academic	—	—
12 October	Antwerp	Belgium	Sportpaleis	The Lathums; The Academic	—	—
14 October	Paris	France	Accor Arena	The Lathums; The Academic	12,843 / 15,571	$741,026
15 October	Amsterdam	Netherlands	Ziggo Dome	The Lathums; The Academic	—	—
17 October	Cologne	Germany	Lanxess Arena	The Lathums; The Academic	—	—
19 October	Prague	Czech Republic	O2 Arena	The Lathums; The Academic	—	—
20 October	Berlin	Germany	Mercedes Benz Arena	The Lathums; The Academic	—	—
22 October	Munich	Germany	Olympiahalle	The Lathums; The Academic	—	—
23 October	Zürich	Switzerland	Hallenstadion	The Lathums; The Academic	4,951 / 6,380	$407,051
8 November	Dublin	Ireland	3Arena	The Academic	7,631 / 9,378	$364,423
10 November	Sheffield	England	Utilita Arena	The Academic; Rachel Chinouriri	8,083 / 9,205	$389,332
11 November	Manchester	England	AO Arena	The Academic; Rachel Chinouriri	11,055 / 11,500	$554,062
12 November	Glasgow	Scotland	OVO Hydro	The Academic; Rachel Chinouriri	9,440 / 10,300	$456,511
14 November	Brighton	England	Brighton Centre	The Academic; Rachel Chinouriri	—	—
15 November	Cardiff	Wales	Cardiff International Arena	The Academic; Rachel Chinouriri	5,385 / 5,900	$270,966
17 November	London	England	The O2 Arena	Sea Girls; The Academic	20,000 / 20,000	—
18 November	Birmingham	England	Resorts World Arena	The Academic; Rachel Chinouriri	11,894 / 13,994	$592,088

List of 2024 concerts
Date (2024)	City	Country	Venue	Opening act	Attendance	Revenue
24 January	Jakarta	Indonesia	Bengkel Space	—N/a	—	—
28 January	Melbourne	Australia	Sidney Myer Music Bowl	Sea Girls; The Velvet Club	7,227 / 9,046	$483,922
30 January	Brisbane	Australia	Riverstage	Sea Girls; Safety Hazard	6,389 / 7,593	437,498
2 February	Sydney	Australia	Qudos Bank Arena	Sea Girls; Club Halifax	9,490 / 11,742	$709,230
2 May	Panama City	Panama	Centro de Convenciones Amador	Némula	1,718 / 2,497	$174,277
5 May	San Juan	Puerto Rico	Coliseo de Puerto Rico	—N/a	2,046 / 5,358	$161,370
8 May	Rio de Janeiro	Brazil	Jeunesse Arena	Giant Rooks	6,101 / 7,598	$387,853
11 May	São Paulo	Brazil	Allianz Parque	Giant Rooks	16,406 / 21,084	$1,299,866
12 May	Curitiba	Brazil	Ligga Arena	Giant Rooks	5,379 / 8,396	$452,919
15 May	Montevideo	Uruguay	Antel Arena	Giant Rooks; Manumi	2,882 / 3,916	$343,658
18 May	Buenos Aires	Argentina	Estadio Vélez Sarsfield	Giant Rooks; Pacífica	20,318 / 27,924	$1,490,300
21 May	Asunción	Paraguay	Jockey Club	Giant Rooks; Kchiporros	3,025 / 4,645	$167,174
24 May	Santiago	Chile	Estadio Bicentenario de La Florida	Giant Rooks; Benjamín Walker	12,979 / 25,919	$829,243
26 May	Lima	Peru	Arena 1	Giant Rooks	5,784 / 6,388	$425,584
28 May	Bogotá	Colombia	Coliseo Medplus	Giant Rooks	5,576 / 8,020	$463,305
30 May	San José	Costa Rica	Parque Viva	Giant Rooks	3,314 / 6,809	$290,948
1 June	Mexico City	Mexico	Autódromo Hermanos Rodriguez – Curva 4	Giant Rooks; DMA's	31,562 / 32,517	$2,788,570
4 June	Querétaro	Mexico	Auditorio Josefa Ortiz de Domínguez	DMA's	4,938 / 4,938	$480,594
6 June	Guadalajara	Mexico	Arena VFG	DMA's	15,000 / 15,000	$1,143,498
Total					347,247 / 471,326 (73.67%)	$22,861,403 (50 shows)

=== Cancelled dates ===
List of cancelled concerts
Date	City	Country	Venue	Reason
21 June	Morrison	United States	Red Rocks Amphitheatre	Hailstorm
