= AnnenMayKantereit =

German rock band

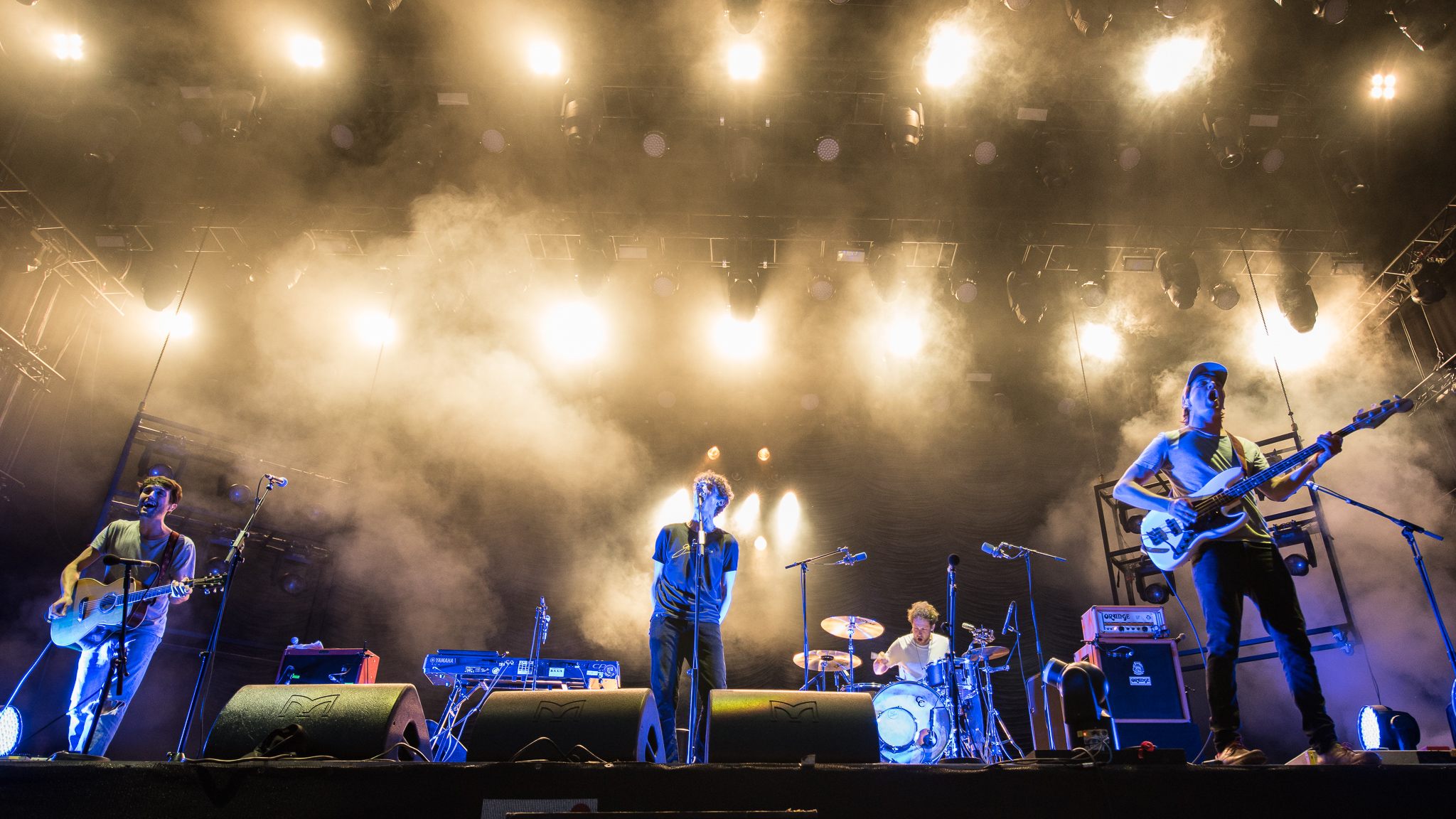
- AnnenMayKantereit performing in Nürnberg in 2017

Background information
- Origin: Cologne, Germany
- Genres: Rock
- Years active: 2011–present
- Members: Christopher Annen (guitar, harmonica); Henning May (vocals, piano, melodica, accordion, ukulele, guitar); Severin Kantereit (drums, cajón); live support: Sophie Chassée (since 2022; electric bass); Ferdinand Schwarz (since 2014; Trumpet); Lisa Buchholz (since 2022; Trumpet); Carla Koellner (since 2022; Trombone); Lucie Graehl (since 2022; Saxophone); Sofía Martin Rodriguez (since 2022; Cello); Pauline Buss (since 2022; Viola); Julia Bruessel (since 2022; Violin); Ségolène de Beaufond (since 2023; Violin)
- Past members: Lars Lötgering (to 2014; double bass); Malte Huck (2014 to 2020; electric bass)
- Website: www.annenmaykantereit.com

AnnenMayKantereit (occasionally shortened AMK) is a German rock band founded in Cologne in 2011. Their songs are predominantly performed in German, but the band also publishes cover songs in English occasionally. A notable feature of the band's music is the distinct and rough voice of singer Henning May.

== History ==
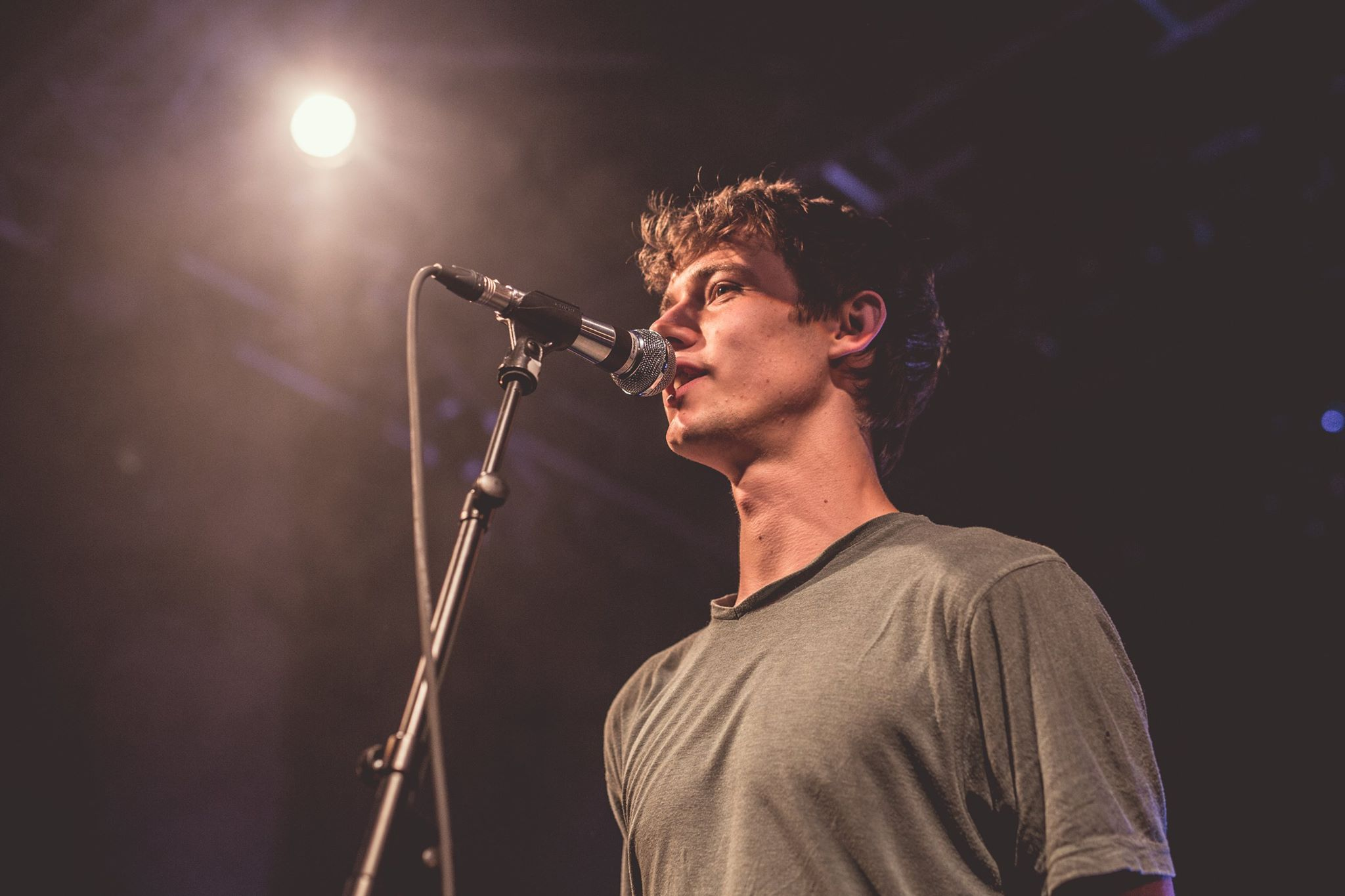
Henning May (2015)

The three founding members, whose joint surnames make up the band name, formed a band while at school at the Schiller-Gymnasium in Sülz in 2011. Initially, these three, Annen, May and Kantereit, performed as street musicians in Cologne. At a jam session, they were joined by double bass player Lars Lötgering. In 2013, they released their first, self-recorded album, which had a release party in Gebäude 9 in Cologne. The album, which was partly recorded on the street, is no longer available. They have their own YouTube channel on which they have published their songs. Malte Huck was the bassist of the band from August 2014 to 2020.

After the release of the music video of their song Wohin du gehst, the band toured Germany. In summer 2014, they played at several big festivals, such as the Appletree Garden Festival, the Open Flair, and the Reeperbahn Festival. In autumn, they played at several concerts as the supporting act for the Beatsteaks and accompanied Clueso on the Stadtrandlichter Tour as a support act. They were finalists in the New Music Award of the ARD-Jugendprogramme.

In December 2014, AnnenMayKantereit were featured in the television programme Circus HalliGalli, and at the beginning of 2015, they went on tour again. In summer 2015 they performed at more festivals, including the Haldern Pop Festival and Rock am Ring. The Hip-Hop group K.I.Z featured singer Henning May in their song Hurra die Welt geht unter.

In autumn 2015, the band signed with Universal. Together with Moses Schneider they recorded the EP Wird schon irgendwie gehen at Hansa-Studios in Berlin. It was released on 16 October, 2015, by the label Vertigo Berlin. Subsequently they had a new tour and sold out numerous venues.

In February 2016 they released the single Pocahontas from their upcoming album "Alles Nix Konkretes". The whole album was released in March 2016 and reached number one on the German album charts.

On December 7, 2018, the band released their new album "Schlagschatten", produced by Markus Ganter, recorded in a small village in Spain.

On January 8, 2019 BMG Rights Management announced that they have concluded a worldwide publishing contract with the band. While not touring in 2018 the band started a new tour at the end of January 2019 in Mannheim (Club Tour). In March 2019 they started a big hall tour.

Due to the COVID-19 pandemic, the band was forced to cancel all planned concerts starting from March 2020. In September 2020, AnnenMayKantereit participated at the mass demonstration Fridays for Future in Berlin where they announced that Malte Huck was leaving the band. In November 2020, the band surprise released their third album 12 without prior announcement.

On the Official Singles Chart Top 100 of 25 March 2022 to 31 March 2022, the band achieved their first UK hit when their version of Suzanne Vega's "Tom's Diner", with Giant Rooks, charted at number 63. On the same date, the song was a new entry on the Official Irish Singles Chart Top 50 at number 33.

In early May 2022, the band announced on their Instagram channel that artist Sophie Chassée would support the band as bass player on their 2022 club tour. Since the club tour in spring 2022 and also at big festivals like Lollapalooza in Berlin the band is supported by a string quartet and a four member jazz combo. Those musicians are also mentioned at the so called "Proberaum sessions" at the YouTube channel of the band.

== Discography ==
=== Studio albums ===
Title	Details	Peak chart positions		
Title	Details	GER	AUT	SWI
AnnenMayKantereit	Released: 2013; Label: AnnenMayKantereit; Format: Digital download, CD, LP	—	—	—
Alles Nix Konkretes	Released: March 2016; Label: Vertigo; Format: Digital download, CD, 2×LP	1	1	6
Schlagschatten	Released: December 2018; Label: Vertigo; Format: Digital download, CD, 2×LP	2	3	10
12	Released: November 2020; Label: AnnenMayKantereit Records; Format: Digital download, CD, LP	4	8	17
Es ist Abend und wir sitzen bei mir	Released: 3 March 2023; Label: AnnenMayKantereit Records; Format: Digital download, CD, LP	1	2	2

=== Live albums ===
Title	Details	Peak chart positions		
Title	Details	GER	AUT	SWI
AnnenMayKantereit & Freunde – Live In Berlin	Released: 2016; Label: Vertigo; Format: Digital download, CD, 2× LP	—	—	—

=== Extended plays ===
Title	Details	Peak chart positions		
Title	Details	GER	AUT	SWI
Wird schon irgendwie gehen	Released: February 2015; Label: AnnenMayKantereit; Format: Digital download, CD, LP	33	—	—

=== Singles ===
==== As lead artist ====
Title	Year	Peak chart positions								Certifications	Album
Title	Year	GER	AUS	AUT	CAN	IRE	SWI	UK	US	Certifications	Album
"Oft Gefragt"	2015	18	—	36	—	—	—	—	—		Wird Schon Irgendwie Gehen
"Pocahontas"	2016	31	—	63	—	—	—	—	—		Alles Nix Konkretes
"Barfuß am Klavier"	2016	51	—	—	—	—	—	—	—		Alles Nix Konkretes
"Marie"	2018	62	—	67	—	—	—	—	—		Schlagschatten
"Schon krass"	2018	98	—	—	—	—	—	—	—		Schlagschatten
"Ozean"	2019	75	—	68	—	—	—	—	—		Non-album singles
"Tom's Diner" (with Giant Rooks)	2019	76	18	48	38	33	86	63	78	BPI: Silver; MC: Platinum; RIAA: Gold	Non-album singles
"Ausgehen"	2020	35	—	34	—	—	68	—	—		Non-album singles
"3 Tage am Meer"	2022	47	—	—	—	—	68	—	—		Non-album singles
“Toxic”	2023										

==== As featured artist ====
Title	Year	Peak chart positions		
Title	Year	GER	AUT	SWI
"Hurra die Welt geht unter" (K.I.Z featuring AnnenMayKantereit)	2015	31	4	1
"On & On" (HER Band featuring AnnenMayKantereit)	2018	—	—	—
"5 Minuten" (KitschKrieg featuring Cro, AnnenMayKantereitt and Trettmann)	2019	10	13	38

== Awards ==
- 2015: Kulturpreis der Sparkassen-Kulturstiftung Rheinland (Sponsorship proposed by Wolfgang Niedecken) (Culture Prize of the Savings Banks Cultural Foundation Rhineland)
- 2015: Deutscher Webvideopreis in the category Music Video (German Web Video Award)
- 2017: Echo in the category Newcomer National
- 2017: Echo in the category Band Pop National
- 2019: 1Live Krone in the category 'Best Band'

== Nomination ==
- 2015: 1LIVE Krone in the category Bester Live-Act
- 2016: 1LIVE Krone in the category Beste Band
- 2016: 1LIVE Krone in the category Bester Live-Act
- 2017: Goldene Kamera Digital Award in the category #MusicAct
