= Junior Brother =

Irish folk singer

- Born: Ronan Kealy; 1993 (age 32–33); Killarney, County Kerry, Ireland
- Origin: County Kerry
- Genres: alternative folk
- Occupation: Singer-songwriter
- Instruments: guitar, tambourine
- Years active: 2014–present
- Label: Strap Originals
- Website: juniorbrother.bandcamp.com

Ronan Kealy (born 1993), known as Junior Brother, is an Irish alternative folk singer-songwriter from County Kerry.

== Early life ==
Kealy grew up in County Kerry. He attended St Brendan's College, Killarney and studied English in University College Cork and Ballyfermot College of Further Education.

== Career ==
Junior Brother moved to Dublin in 2014 to begin his career. His stage name is taken from a character in the Elizabethan play The Revenger's Tragedy. He was named as one of RTÉ's Rising Irish Stars of 2018, and as one of The Irish Times' "Irish music contenders ready to break through in 2019".

His first album, Pull The Right Rope, was nominated for the Choice Music Prize. In a 4-star review for The Irish Times, music journalist Tony Clayton-Lea wrote: "...the tales told here are full of wide-eyed wonders and keen observations. Between the clatter of one and clarity of the other, Junior Brother’s songs are the real deal." Music website The Last Mixed Tape wrote of the album: "An album of pure expression, Pull The Right Rope is a masterclass in the sheer joy of creation."

In March 2019 he appeared on The Tommy Tiernan Show, and in April 2020 on Other Voices (Irish TV series).

His third album The End was nominated for the 2025 Choice Music Prize.

== Discography ==
=== EPs ===
- Fuck Off, I Love You (2016)
- PowPig / Junior Brother (2019; a 4-A-side single with fellow artist PowPig)

=== Studio albums ===
- Pull The Right Rope (2019)
- The Great Irish Famine (2022)
- The End (2025)

== Awards and nominations ==
=== Choice Music Prize ===
Year	Nominated work	Award	Result
2019	Pull The Right Rope	Album of the Year	Nominated
2025	The End	Album of the Year	Nominated

=== RTÉ Radio 1 Folk Awards ===
Year	Nominated work	Award	Result
2019	Pull The Right Rope	Best Folk Album	Nominated
