= Strap Originals =

English independent record label

- Founded: 2019
- Founder: Peter Doherty, Jai Stanley, Greg Thomas
- Location: United Kingdom
- Official website: strap-originals.com

Strap Originals is an English independent record label, founded in 2019 by Peter Doherty, his manager Jai Stanley and Visual Concepts founder Greg Thomas.

The label's debut release was the self-titled debut by Peter Doherty and The Puta Madres in 2019, albums from Trampolene, Vona Vella and Andrew Cushin were the first to follow.

In 2024, Strap Originals released PREGOBLIN's debut album PREGOBLIN II, with Peter Doherty featuring on the lead single "These Hands AKA Danny Knife."

Artists on its current roster include AmyJo Doh & The Spangles, Babyshambles, Evan Williams, GANS, Jack Jones, Junior Brother, Peter Doherty, PREGOBLIN, Real Farmer, Trampolene, Vona Vella and Warmduscher.

In 2025, Strap Originals achieved their first top ten album, with Felt Better Alive by Peter Doherty debuting at number 7. Later that year, Babyshambles' first single in twelve years, "Dandy Hooligan", was released via Strap Originals.

== Artists ==
=== Strap Originals ===
==== Current ====
- AmyJo Doh & The Spangles
- Babyshambles
- Evan Williams
- GANS
- Jack Jones
- Junior Brother
- Peter Doherty
- PREGOBLIN
- Real Farmer
- Trampolene
- Vona Vella
- Warmduscher

== Discography ==
=== Albums ===
Catalog number	Year	Artist	Title
SOLP001	2019	Peter Doherty and The Puta Madres	Peter Doherty and The Puta Madres
SOLP002	2021	Trampolene	Love No Less Than A Queen
SOLP003	2022	Peter Doherty & Frédéric Lo	The Fantasy Life Of Poetry & Crime
SOLP005	2023	Trampolene	Live From Swansea Arena
SOLP006	2023	Trampolene	Rules Of Love & War
SOLP009	2023	Vona Vella	Vona Vella
SOLP010	2023	Andrew Cushin	Waiting For The Rain
SOLP011	2023	Trampolene	Swansea To Hornsey (Anniversary)
SOLP012	2024	PREGOBLIN	PREGOBLIN II
SOLP013	2024	Real Farmer	Compare What's There
SOLP015	2024	Jack Jones	Jack Jones
SOLP016	2024	Warmduscher	Too Cold To Hold
SOLP017	2024	AmyJo Doh & The Spangles	SpangleLandia
SOLP019	2024	Evan Williams	The View From Halfway Down
SOLP020	2025	Peter Doherty	Felt Better Alive
SOLP021	2025	GANS	GOOD FOR THE SOUL
SOLP023	2025	Junior Brother	The End
SOLP024	2026	Vona Vella	Carnival
SOLP026	2026	Real Farmer	Two Wrongs Don't Make A Right
