= Jack Jones (Welsh musician) =

Welsh musician, songwriter and poet

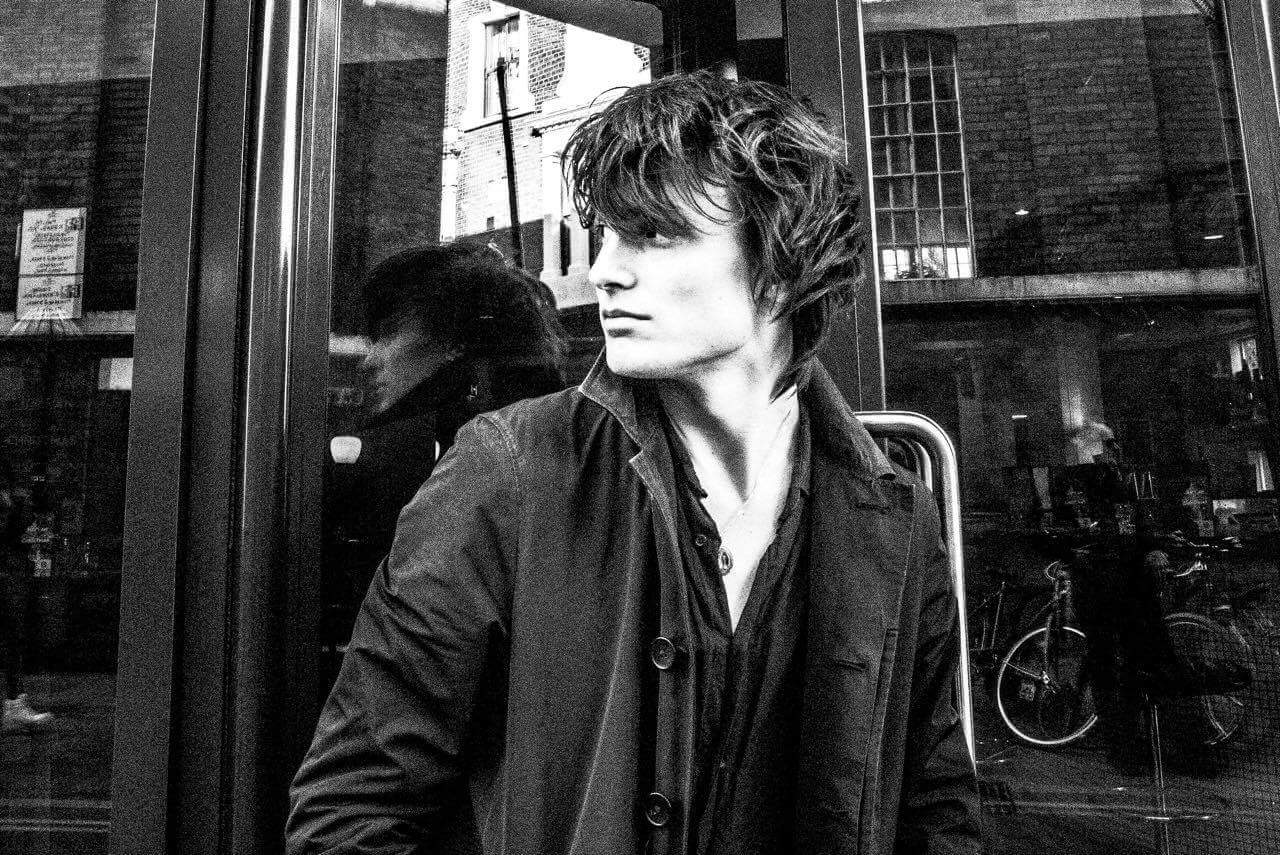
- Jones in 2016

Background information
- Born: Swansea, Wales
- Genres: Alternative rock; garage rock; indie rock; poetry; spoken word
- Occupations: Musician; songwriter; poet; author
- Instruments: Vocals; guitar
- Member of: Trampolene; Peter Doherty and the Puta Madres

Jack Jones is a Welsh musician, songwriter, poet and author.

His debut solo album Jack Jones was released 20 September 2024 featuring the single 'Breathe'. It reached number 3 in the Independent Breakers Chart, 13 in the Independent Albums chart and was awarded Album of the Week in Louder Than War. He is the lead vocalist and guitarist in the alternative rock band Trampolene, and is also the guitarist in Peter Doherty and the Puta Madres and Peter Doherty's current touring band. Jones is also known for his spoken word poetry, being the subject of a BBC Radio 4 documentary titled "Another Swansea Poet" broadcast in 2019.

Jones' first novel Swansea to Hornsey was published by Strap Originals on 17 November 2023.

He was born in Swansea and currently lives between London, Berlin and Swansea.

== Career ==
=== Music ===
Jones is songwriter, guitarist and lead singer in the band Trampolene, and although he has performed as a solo artist during this time he officially launched his solo career in June 2024.

During May 2016, Jones supported Peter Doherty on his UK "Eudaimonia" tour and played guitar for him. Venues included Glasgow Barrowland Ballroom and two nights at Hackney Empire in London. He also performed at The Libertines secret show at The Boogaloo, London in July 2016.

In 2016 he performed solo at Latitude Festival, whose website describes him as a "music icon".

In November 2016, the day after Trampolene headlined at The Water Rats in London, Jones flew to Argentina to become Doherty's lead guitarist in his band the Puta Madres, for a November/December 2016 tour of Argentina, France and UK. They played two shows for the reopening of Le Bataclan in Paris, followed by a week's tour across France and then Kentish Town Forum in London and Manchester Albert Hall. Jones opened the shows with a solo music and spoken word set, before rejoining the stage as Peter's lead guitarist. He was described in a five star review in The Independent as "Swansea's finest" and "sickeningly talented".

Jones played two solo shows at the end of 2016, Kazoopa Festival, Leeds in November and This Feeling's New Year's Eve night at Nambucca, London.

He played two solo shows at Russell Brand's charity Trew Era Cafe, toured European and South American festivals across Europe in the summer as Doherty's guitarist and a performed a solo acoustic and spoken word set and a DJ set at Glastonbury festival.

In November 2017 Jones was interviewed by Janice Long and played acoustic songs live on her BBC Radio Wales show. He was also featured on the promotional video for Swansea's bid for City of Culture.

Jones was featured on "Red Stripe Presents: This Feeling TV" in May 2018.

To commemorate Trampolene's appearance at BBC Music's Biggest Weekend in Swansea in May 2018, Jones was featured in a "Wonder Wall" mural of Welsh musicians, by street artist Pure Evil.

His debut solo single, the AA side "Swim Up"/"It's Not My Thing" was released on 7 September 2018 and was played regularly on BBC Radio 1, Radio 6 and Radio X. The single was written with and features Mike Moore, who also plays guitar for Liam Gallagher.

In October 2018 he played instore gigs and signing sessions on a short tour of Japan.

In 2019 Jones toured the UK with Peter Doherty and the Puta Madres, followed by a European tour and several festival appearances with them.

He played guitar and sang with Doherty on BBC Radio 4's "Loose Ends", broadcast on 13 April and on John Kennedy's Xposure show on Radio X, broadcast 30 April 2019.

Jones supported Peter Doherty at PowerHaus (formally and now renamed Dingwalls) in Camden, London on 24 and 25 July 2021.

In November 2021 he completed his first solo tour, playing in Cardiff, London, Manchester and Glasgow with a set of music, spoken word poetry and anecdotes.

In 2022 Jones played solo shows in Swansea, Manchester, London and Basingstoke, plus the Love Trails festival in Gower, Wales. In December 2022 he returned to play The Bunkhouse in Swansea and ended the year with a New Year's Eve show at the Albion Rooms, Margate.

In April 2023 he supported Peter Doherty on a solo tour in Germany.

In 2024 following the announcement of his solo album, Jones debuted his new guitar-free songs firstly at a Strap Originals birthday celebration at the 100 Club in London, then a set at Strummerville stage at Glastonbury festival, filming the videos for his singles "Who Let the Bass Pump Through the Floor" and "Peaches Out Of Reach" whilst at the festival. He supported Peter Doherty in Manchester and Wolverhampton in August.

Following the release of his debut album, Jones embarked on a week of record shop instore gigs and signings across the UK.

The self-titled album, released by Strap Originals, entered at no.3 in the Independent Breakers Chart, 9 in the Record Store chart, 13 in the Independent Albums chart and top 30 positions for other album charts in the UK.

In November 2024 he toured the UK in support of his album, including shows in London, Manchester, Liverpool, Cardiff and Glasgow.

In late 2024 Jones also played shows in Berlin at Janinebeangallery, and Paris at la Mecanique Ondulatoire and an instore at Balades Sonores.

In February 2025 he supported The Libertines on their European tour.

Jones joined Peter Doherty's new touring band, playing guitar and occasional bass across Europe in April and May 2025. He was also support on the last four German shows. This role continued through summer festivals of 2025 and another European tour in February 2026.

=== Spoken word ===
In addition to his poems being an integral part of Trampolene as a band, Jack Jones also performs spoken word poetry as a solo artist. Dr John Cooper Clarke has described his writing as "...exceptional poetry, funny and depressing at the same time and how often can you say that."

The video for Health & Wellbeing (at Wood Green Job Centre) was premiered on The Guardian website, Ketamine was premiered on Vice Noisey on 21 October 2015, Pound Land was premiered on Gigwise on 18 December 2015. Gigwise said of Jack Jones "indie has a new poster boy" in their article "Artists who are going to own 2016". Music business legend and 1965 Records owner James Endeacott described Trampolene as a "great band and their singer Jack is a wonder" when sharing the video for Artwork of Youth on his blog.

In 2015, Jones performed his poetry at The Great Escape Festival in Brighton, Stoke Newington Literary Festival and "Bring the Ruckus" at The Albany in London.

In January 2016 he was personally invited by Peter Doherty and Carl Barât of The Libertines to perform on their sell-out arena tour. He performed two poems and then welcomed the band to the stage in front of 20,000 fans. In his first feature in the NME he is introduced as "Jack Jones, singer in Welsh indie rockers Trampolene, plucked from life living in the back of his broken-down van to follow in the proud pre-Libs poetry footsteps of none other than Russell Brand." On 7 September 2016 he reprised this role to perform his "To Be A Libertine" poem and introduce The Libertines at Brixton Academy for their Unity Rocks charity show.

Jack Jones was the subject of a BBC Radio 4 documentary called "Another Swansea Poet", broadcast on 31 March 2019.

He performed a spoken word and solo music set at the Mother Wolf Club night in London on 24 June 2021.

His first solo tour in November 2021 included his spoken word poetry, songs and anecdotes.

Jones has performed and given poetry masterclasses at both Swansea and Kingston universities.

=== Writing and other media ===
Jones' first fashion shoot was for OutThere Style magazine, published February 2016 and was featured wearing jewellery for Pirate Treasures "Stage Style" collection also in February 2016.

Jones wrote an article for The Guardian which was published on 18 March 2016.

On 15 June 2016 the NME published a poem Jones wrote for them about the UK's EU Referendum, based on The Clash song "Should I Stay or Should I Go?".

In July 2022 he was a guest on the Gig Stories podcast recorded live at Kendal Calling festival, where he was performing with Trampolene.

Jones' first novel Swansea to Hornsey was published by Strap Originals on 17 November 2023.

His second book Tour Diaries Volume 1 was published by Strap Originals on 20 September 2024.

He has appeared on popular podcasts including Episode 101 of Problematic Pub Podcast with Sandro Ford and Ambition is Critical podcast, plus online interviews with John Robb for Louder Than War, RGM and Swans Cast.

== Influences ==
Jones' writing influences include Julian Cope and Dylan Thomas and according to The Musical Manual his spoken word poem Ketamine "shares stark resemblance to workings of punk-poet legend, John Cooper Clarke.". Even the Stars music blog described "Ketamine" as "laced with wit and humour and the other ["Pound Land"] a droll comical observation of modern life based around a visit to Poundland". Jones has been described as a "singer, guitarist and full-on enigma", a "fine poet...With a John Cooper Clarke-esque delivery of his sideways glance into the uglier corners of modern society...wistful and witty poems" and as having "extraordinary stage presence".

== Personal life ==
Jones is a lifelong Swansea City fan. In addition to supporting the Welsh side, he is a follower of Southampton, due to his father hailing from the city.
