= Trampolene (band) =

Welsh rock band

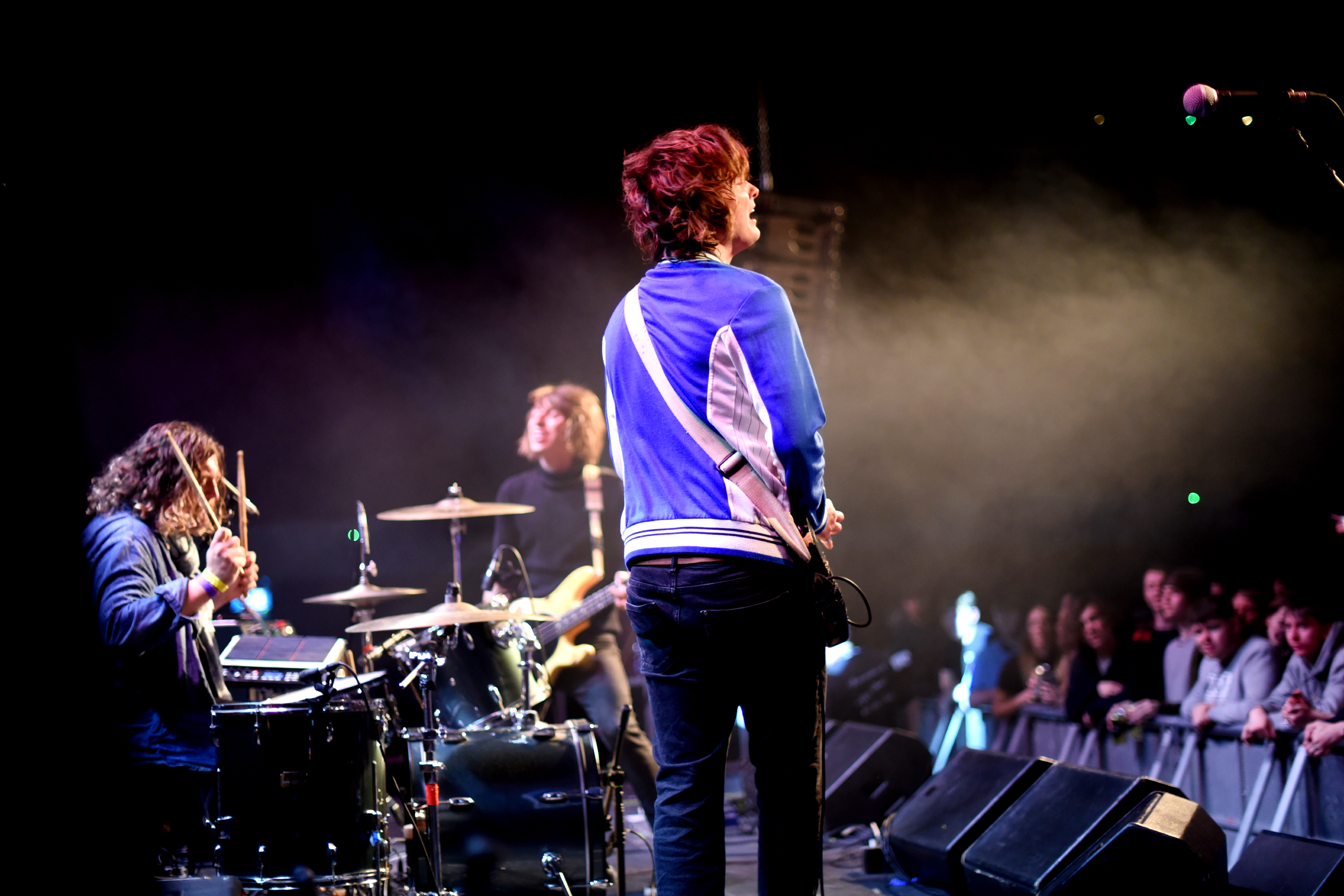
- Trampolene performing live in 2022

Background information
- Origin: Swansea, Wales
- Genres: Indie rock; alternative rock
- Years active: 2013–present
- Labels: Mi7; Strap Originals
- Members: Jack Jones; Wayne Thomas; Kyle "Mr" Williams
- Past members: Rob Steele; Jay Bone
- Website: trampolene.co.uk

Trampolene are a Welsh alternative rock band formed in Swansea in 2013. They are Jack Jones (vocals, guitar, spoken word), Wayne Thomas (bass, vocals), Kyle "Mr" Williams (drums, piano, violin, vocals) and Lee Thomas (guitar).

Trampolene have achieved two number one UK Official Album Breakers Chart albums, and reached the top ten in the Official Independent Chart several times.

The band have toured the UK extensively, including sold out shows at the iconic 100 Club, Lexington and Scala in London, Deaf Institute and Night & Day in Manchester and Clwb Ifor Bach in Cardiff. They toured France in April 2026 with sold out shows in Paris, Bordeaux and Toulouse, and have played across Europe including Berlin, Amsterdam, Ghent and Milan.

They are managed by music industry veteran Alan McGee and Kevin Fitzgerald.

On 25 February 2022 Trampolene headlined and sold out the opening of Swansea Arena, and released their show as a live album entitled Live from Swansea Arena.

== History ==
=== 2013–2015: Early years ===
Trampolene are named after Julian Cope's 1987 song "Trampolene". They formed in their hometown of Swansea - Jones and Thomas having met when playing for the Football Association of Wales and Jones knew drummer "Mr Williams" from school.

They moved to a flat in London with the idea of it being a 24/7 creative work factory, like Andy Warhol's Factory, where no internet was allowed, and they invited artists to come round and share ideas and talk about songwriting, poetry, painting and society in general. Jones roadied for Palma Violets and the Strypes in 2013. Although Jones suffers from Crohn's disease resulting in regular hospital appointments for treatment, the band began to play gigs across the country, gaining support from people such as Ray Davies of the Kinks, journalists Pete Paphides and Caitlin Moran, and musicians Carl Barât and Nick Hodgson.

Through mi7 Records they released limited edition 7" singles "My Bourgeoisie Girl"/"Under the Strobe Light" and "You Do Nothing for Me"/"Adrenaline" in 2013. "Under the Strobe Light" made them online music magazine Louder Than War's New Band of the Day. Following the release of download-only single "I Don't Know" in early 2014, The Guardian called Trampolene "the saviours of indie guitar music". This was followed in April 2014 by their first downloadable "Pocket Album" (5 songs and 1 poem) "Alcohol Kiss" which was also released as a three track limited edition single and also available on a very limited number of USB wristbands featuring music, typed lyrics and Wayne Thomas's oil paintings. They toured throughout the year across the UK and also in France, finishing the year supporting Carl Barât & the Jackals on New Year's Eve at the Macbeth in Hoxton, London.

March 2015 saw the release of Pocket Album Two and single "Imagine Something Yesterday", which was a Q Magazine Track of the Day. The video for spoken word "Health & Wellbeing (At Wood Green Job Centre)" was premiered on The Guardian online.

A line-up change in the Spring of 2015 saw Mr Williams leave the band and Jones' childhood friend Rob Steele join as Trampolene's new drummer.

Pocket Album Three was released in October 2015, the video for "It's Not Rock & Roll" was premiered on Clash Music website and the single received airplay on Radio X and was played by Greg James and Huw Stephens BBC Radio 1, with the Independent newspaper calling it "new music to listen to this week". The video for their cover of Leonard Cohen's "Tonight Will Be Fine" was premiered on Gigwise on 7 October and "Ketamine" on Noisey on 21 October.

Trampolene recorded a live session for "artists in residence" on John Kennedy's X-Posure show on Radio X and also for Gigwise in November 2015.

Gigs during 2015 included supporting Carl Barât & the Jackals at the Scala, London, headlining James Endeacott's 1965 Records night at the Amersham Arms, in New Cross, a four-week Friday night residency at KOKO in Camden, sets at Glastonbury and Isle of Wight festivals, supporting punk legends Buzzcocks, a headline UK tour for This Feeling in association with XFM and Jack Rocks, the Black Heart in Camden, and finishing in December at Nambucca, on Holloway Road, London, building a loyal following of fans along the way.

The video for poem "Pound Land" was premiered on Gigwise on 18 December.

=== 2016–2017: Release of Swansea to Hornsey ===
Trampolene's first gig of 2016 was at Brixton Jamm on 6 February.

Download-only single "Tom Hardy" was This Feeling's Track of the Day on Gigslutz website 28 February 2016.

Trampolene began a UK tour beginning in April 2016, with headline dates across the country throughout the year including KOKO, Nambucca and The Water Rats in London, plus venues across the UK including Manchester, Leeds, Sheffield, York, Swansea, Dundee, Preston, Plymouth and the John Peel Centre for Creative Arts in Stowmarket. They also played the Greenpeace stage at Glastonbury festival for the second year running, and headlined the Jack Rocks This Feeling stage at Leeds Festival. Other festival appearances included Y Not, Kendal Calling and Party in the Pines.

During May 2016, Jones supported Peter Doherty on his "Eudaimonia" UK tour and also played guitar for him. Venues included Glasgow Barrowlands Ballroom, Manchester's Albert Hall and two nights at London's Hackney Empire (where Wayne joined him to sing harmony).

Single "The Gangway" was premiered on BBC Radio 1 by Huw Stephens on 29 June 2016, followed by John Kennedy on Radio X on 30 June and subsequently played on various radio stations. The song is featured on Pocket Album Four, which was released on 12 August 2016 and reached the top 20 in digital charts across Europe.

On 7 September 2016, Jones was asked to perform "To Be a Libertine" and introduce the Libertines to the stage at their sell-out Unity Rocks charity show.

Trampolene's "homecoming" show at The Scene Bar in Swansea on 30 September was reported in the South Wales Evening Post, particularly because a fan travelled from Japan to see them.

Jones recorded an acoustic session for The Selector radio station of The British Council.

"Divided Kingdom" was released as a single on 11 October 2016 and was This Feeling's Track of the Day on Gigslutz website, plus Track/Song of the Day on other online music magazines. It was premiered on BBC Radio One on the Annie Mac show, first played on Radio X by John Kennedy and on BBC Radio Wales by Adam Walton. The video was premiered on Gigwise website.

Pocket Album Five was released on 25 November 2016.

In November 2016, the day after Trampolene headlined a sold-out show for This Feeling (club night) at Water Rats in London, Jones flew to Argentina as Peter Doherty's lead guitarist in his band the Puta Madres, for a November/December 2016 tour of Argentina, France and UK. They played two shows for the reopening of Le Bataclan in Paris, followed by a week's tour across France and shows in London and Manchester. Jack Jones opened the shows with a solo music and spoken word set, before rejoining the stage as Doherty's lead guitarist.

The video for "Blue Balls and a Broken Heart" was filmed during a Puta Madres show in Lyon and was premiered on NME on 29 November.

The video for "She's a Nice Girl" was released January 2017 and "Slug" on 4 February.

In January 2017, Trampolene began a series of "House Party" gigs, playing in fans' houses. They made the Welsh newspapers after playing in a young fan's garage.

Trampolene played four dates in Scotland, 28 February and 1–3 March 2017, then Paris on 25 March at La Mecanique, plus a secret show at Le Tigre. Shows in Spring included Sioux club in Ghent, Belgium and a charity gig fundraising for Crohn's & Colitis UK in Swindon; Cardiff, Leeds and The Great Escape Festival in Brighton. 2017 shows included a headline tour across the UK, a series of summer festival dates including Isle of Wight and Reading, in association with This Feeling and Jack Rocks, two shows supporting the Libertines in September, and five dates supporting Liam Gallagher of Oasis on his UK arena tour in December.

The Beautiful Pain EP was released on 7 July, along with videos for the title track and "Saving My Life in A&E", both filmed and directed by Roger Sargent, which were premiered on Gigwise.

Trampolene's debut studio album Swansea to Hornsey was released on 27 October 2017 and was included in The Independent newspaper's 30 best albums of 2017. It caused controversy when Facebook threatened to delete the band's account, as the album cover features a childhood nude photograph of Jack and his sister.

Trampolene toured the UK during November 2017, known as the Hi-Vis Tour with Jones wearing a hi-vis jacket on stage every night.

They supported Liam Gallagher on his arena tour in December 2017.

=== 2018–2019 ===
The single "Hard Times for Dreamers" was released in March 2018, premiered by Phil Taggart on BBC Radio One on 19 March 2018 and was made Track of the Day on several music blogs.

The band recorded a live session at BBC Maida Vale studio which was broadcast on Huw Stephens show on Radio One 26 and 27 March.

In the Spring of 2018 they toured the UK, ending with their biggest headline show to date at Scala, London. The band headlined the BBC Music Introducing stage at BBC Biggest Weekend festival in Swansea in May, in June they supported Liam Gallagher at Finsbury Park, London and Kasabian in Bristol. They played several festivals throughout the summer, including Kendal Calling, Truck, Victorious and Wheels and Fins.

In July 2018, they recorded a session for Radio X.

They released a 28-track double album titled Pick a Pocket or Two on 7 September 2018, which entered the UK Official Independent Breakers Chart at number 10. The title came from a fan suggestion, as it featured songs and poems from the Pocket Album series of EPs.

They released the single "The One Who Loves You" in October 2018.

In October 2018, they supported the Sherlocks on tour across the UK, before their own headline tour in November which included Dingwalls in London and Clwb Ifor Bach in Cardiff.

In January 2019, they appeared on Soccer AM on British Sky television.

Their first live show of 2019 was an Mi7 Records label night at Dublin Castle on 5 June.

On 29 September 2019, it was announced on Trampolene's social media that drummer Rob Steele and the band had parted ways.

=== 2019–2021 ===
Jay Bone joined the band as their new drummer, he previously met them whilst drumming for Carl Barât.

In November 2019, Trampolene supported Liam Gallagher at Cardiff Motorpoint Arena and in December 2019 they supported the Libertines on four dates of their UK tour.

They supported the Sherlocks in March 2020 at Camden's Electric Ballroom and Cardiff Tramshed.

In April 2020, Trampolene's albums were featured on Twitter listening parties organised by Tim Burgess under the name "Tim's Twitter Listening Party".

In May 2020 during COVID-19 lockdown, Trampolene and Peter Doherty recorded and released the single "Uncle Brian's Abattoir" to download and stream, with accompanying video filmed in Swansea and Normandy which was premiered on NME's website.

In February 2021, NME premiered Trampolene's video for the spoken word poem "Come Join Me in Life".

The single "Oh Lover" was released 12 March 2021, along with news of Trampolene signing to Doherty's new record label Strap Originals.

On 12 April 2021, the video for "Gotta Do More Gotta Be More", the third in a sequence filmed and directed by Roger Sargent, was released.

The video and single "Shoot the Lights" was released on 24 June 2021.

Trampolene played shows in August 2021 at The Deaf Institute in Manchester, The Globe Cardiff and Moth Club in London.

Trampolene's studio album Love No Less Than a Queen was released on 3 September 2021 and entered the UK Official Independent Albums Chart at number 5, number 1 in the Independent Breakers Chart, number 12 in the Official Vinyl Chart and number 20 in the Official Album Sales Chart in the UK Official Chart.

The band played a series of instore gigs and record signings the week following the release of Love No Less Than a Queen, at Rough Trade Bristol, Banquet in Kingston, Jacaranda in Liverpool and Vinyl Whistle in Leeds.

In December 2021, Trampolene supported the Libertines at the Manchester Academy and the Forum Kentish Town.

=== 2022 ===
Jay Bone left the band and Kyle "Mr" Williams, Trampolene's original drummer, re-joined.

The first show of 2022, and Mr Williams' return as Trampolene drummer was supporting the Libertines at the Great Hall, Cardiff University on 19 February.

On 25 February, Trampolene headlined the new Swansea Arena.

Trampolene returned to Paris to play Supersonic in April 2022 and in May they supported Peter Doherty at London's KOKO, Birmingham Town Hall and Cambridge Junction.

In July 2022, Trampolene played Tim Peaks Diner stage at Kendal Calling festival.

The first single, "Thinking Again" from their third studio album Rules of Love & War was released for streaming and download on 13 October 2022 and was also included on the soundtrack of the video game NBA 2K23.

In October, Trampolene were main support for the Libertines for five shows on their European tour, playing in Brussels, Paris, Cologne, Hamburg and Drammen.

On 4 November, they were main support for Jamie Webster at the Great Hall, Cardiff.

Trampolene made their second appearance on Sky Sports Soccer AM on 26 November 2022.

=== 2023: Release of Rules of Love & War ===
The band's single "Money" was released 19 January 2023.

The band toured the UK as part of Independent Venue Week in January/February 2023.

After releasing the single "Together", the band went on to release their fourth studio album Rules of Love & War. The album had a very successful debut, peaking in many different categories on officialcharts.com as well as outselling U2 in record shops in the week between 24 and 30 March 2023. The band played a series of instore/outstore shows for record shops across the UK in the week following the album's release.

Trampolene performed the song "Lena Lullaby" live on the BBC Radio 4 programme Loose Ends on 24 March 2023.

In April 2023, the band played their biggest UK headline tour to date, including sold out shows at Manchester's Yes, Rough Trade in Bristol and the iconinc 100 Club in London. Also in April they made their debut in Berlin, playing a headline show at Napoleon Komplex.

During the summer, they supported Peter Doherty and played several festivals across the UK including Sound City and Bingley, and London Calling festival in Amsterdam.

In October Trampolene's "Oh the Places You'll Go" tour took them to towns in England they had never (or rarely) played before.

Trampolene's songs "Thinking Again" and "Gotta Do More Gotta Be More" were included in the NBA 2K23 and NBA 2K24 video game soundtracks respectively.

On 17 November the sold out debut album Swansea to Hornsey was reissued due to popular demand as an anniversary edition, along with Jack Jones' debut novel of the same name. Jack and the band completed a series of instore shows and book readings.

This was followed by three special shows in Manchester, Cardiff and London where Trampolene performed the whole of Swansea to Hornsey live for the first time.

=== 2024–present ===
Trampolene played several festivals over the summer of 2024, including Glastonbury, In It Together, Lakefest and London's Summer by the River.

In May 2025 they took time out from working on their next album to play The Great Escape festival in Brighton, for their record label Strap Originals' takeover of the Beach stage, alongside other label acts and headlined by Peter Doherty, whose new touring band includes Trampolene's Jack Jones.

As of summer 2025 Trampolene are managed by music industry veteran Alan McGee and Kevin Fitzgerald.

In July 2025 Trampolene announced a series of shows supporting Public Image Ltd and Ocean Colour Scene.

Trampolene supported Public Image Ltd and Ocean Colour Scene for three shows each during July and August 2025.

In September 2025 they toured supporting Republica adding Lee Thomas to the lineup as touring guitarist, and announced another run supporting Public Image Ltd in January 2026.

Trampolene supported Babyshambles on three of their reunion tour shows in November 2025.

They sold out two nights at London's The Lexington on 2 and 3 February 2026.

In April 2026 they toured France, with sold out shows in Paris, Bordeaux and Toulouse. They have played headline shows throughout 2026 including Wrexham, Liverpool, Manchester and a tour of South Wales in June.

== Musical style ==
Trampolene are an alternative rock or indie rock band, with influences as diverse as the Prodigy, Oasis and Dylan Thomas.

They are described in the media as having "raw, unpolished talent...backed by squealing guitar riffs", "supercharged indie rock" with "tons of attitude and loads of melody".

Gigwise have called them "the perfect package", The Gig Channel say "Trampolene combines poetry and rock'n'roll perfectly" and This Feeling say they "do not fail to deliver with their unique combo of garage rock, kitchen-sink poetry and acoustic heartbreakers." Music website Gigslutz adding "the raw combination of the spoken word united with a weightier expression of rock rhythm symbolised This Feeling’s manifestation of exciting new talent".

== Discography ==
=== Studio albums ===
- Swansea to Hornsey (27 October 2017)
- Pick a Pocket or Two (7 September 2018)
- Love No Less Than a Queen (3 September 2021)
- Rules of Love & War (17 March 2023)
- Swansea to Hornsey Anniversary Edition Reissue (17 November 2023)

=== Live albums ===
- Trampolene — Live from Swansea Arena (released digitally 25 August 2022 and physically 17 March 2023)

=== EPs ===
- Pocket Album One (28 April 2014)
- Pocket Album Two (16 March 2015)
- Pocket Album Three (2 October 2015)
- Pocket Album Four (12 August 2016)
- Pocket Album Five (25 November 2016)
- Beautiful Pain (7 July 2017)

=== Singles ===
- "You Do Nothing for Me" / "Adrenaline" 7" and digital download (12 August 2013)
- "My Bourgeoisie Girl" / "Under the Strobe Light" 7" and digital download with bonus songs "Very Thin" / "Swansea to Hornsey" (25 November 2013)
- "I Don't Know" free download (3 February 2014)
- "Newcastle Brown (Love Song)" free download (3 November 2014)
- "Pound Land" free download (11 December 2015)
- "Tom Hardy" free download (26 February 2016)
- "The Gangway" (1 July 2016)
- "Divided Kingdom" (11 October 2016)
- "Hard Times for Dreamers" (March 2018)
- "The One Who Loves You" (October 2018)
- "Uncle Brian's Abattoir" featuring Peter Doherty (May 2020)
- "Come Join Me in Life" digital (26 February 2021)
- "Oh Lover" (13 March 2021)
- "Gotta Do More Gotta Be More" (12 April 2021)
- "Shoot the Lights" (24 June 2021)
- "Thinking Again" (13 October 2022)
- "Sort Me Out" (25 November 2023)
- "Money" (19 January 2023)
- "Together" (2 March 2023)
