= Peter Doherty and the Puta Madres =

British band

Peter Doherty and The Puta Madres
- Origin: London, England
- Genres: Psychedelic rock, post-punk revival, garage rock
- Years active: 2016–present
- Label: Strap Originals
- Members: Pete Doherty; Jack Jones; Katia De Vidas; Miki Beavis; Miggles; Rafa
- Past members: Drew McConnell
- Website: Official website

Peter Doherty and the Puta Madres are a British band, formed by Pete Doherty (lead vocals, rhythm guitar) and is his third musical project after the Libertines and Babyshambles. On 28 January 2019 they released their debut single, "Who's Been Having You Over", followed by "Paradise is Under Your Nose" on 5 April. The band's first album, the self titled Peter Doherty and The Puta Madres, was released on 26 April 2019.

== History ==
Peter Doherty and the Puta Madres was formed of members of Doherty's touring band from his 2016 "Eudaimonia" tour, including Drew McConnell, bass player in Doherty's previous band, Babyshambles. In November 2016 they flew to Argentina - recruiting Trampolene's Jack Jones as guitarist at the last minute - to rehearse, before playing their first show together under the Puta Madres name and returning to Europe to play the newly reopened Bataclan in Paris, before shows in London and Manchester.

Over the next two years, the band toured Europe and South America and played many festivals.

In 2017 McConnell left to join Liam Gallagher's touring band and was replaced with French musician Michael Bontemps, known as Miggles.

In January 2019 their first single "Who's Been Having You Over" was released and it was announced the Puta Madres' debut album would be out on 26 April.

In February 2019 they played six sold out shows across the UK supported by Marc Eden, culminating in a date at London Forum on 12th May.

Between 31 March and 2 April 2019 the band played two shows and a live television performance in France.

Their second single "Paradise is Under Your Nose" was premiered online on 2 April and released digitally on 5 April. It was co-written by and features vocals by Jack Jones. Jones and Doherty appeared on the BBC Radio 4 show "Loose Ends", broadcast on 13 April. The same day, along with Katia de Vidas, they performed at Rough Trade West in Notting Hill, London and the band released a double A side pink vinyl of the first two singles for Record Store Day.

The debut album "Peter Doherty & The Puta Madres" was released on 26 April 2019 and the band played a sold out instore show and signing session at Rough Trade East, London, and another the following day in Liverpool, before embarking on a UK and European tour and festival appearances worldwide.

== Band members ==
Current members

- Pete Doherty – lead vocals, rhythm guitar, sitar, lyrics (2016–present)
- Katia De Vidas – piano, keyboard (2016–present)
- Miki Beavis – violin (2016–present)
- Rafa – drums (2016–present)
- Jack Jones – lead guitar (2016–present)
- Miggles (aka Michael Bontemps) – bass (2017–present)

Former members

- Drew McConnell – bass (2016–2017)

== Discography ==
=== Studio albums ===
- Peter Doherty and the Puta Madres (April 2019) [UK Album Chart: No.25]

=== Singles ===
- "Who's Been Having You Over" (January 2019)
- "Paradise Is Under Your Nose" (April 2019)
