= Marc Eden =

English musician (born 1969)

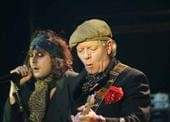
- Eden performing with Ariel Bender

Background information
- Born: October 11, 1969 (age 57); Margate, England
- Genres: rock; hard rock; blues; glam rock; psychedelia
- Instruments: vocals, guitars, bass, piano, drums
- Labels: Telstar (Universal); Org; Pacific Records; Cargo Records; wardlaw music

Marc Eden (born 11 October 1969 in Margate) is an English musician.

== Career ==
Marc Eden started singing rock ‘n’ roll around the local pubs/clubs at age 15. He moved to London in 1991 to become a musician and writer.

In 1999 he signed with Telstar Records. This was with the 4-piece glam/U.K. electro punk band SEVEN, which became DNA doll. DNA doll recorded an EP with Andy Gill from Gang of Four and played Glastonbury on 28 June 2003 before being invited by Slash from Guns N' Roses to write/record in Los Angeles. That resulted in four tracks that have yet to be released, including an early version of Velvet Revolver's "Slither".

in 2011, Eden formed Men & Gods with Seven/DNA collaborator Alrick Guyler and signed to Pacific Records. In addition, he formed The Peckham Cowboys, who signed to the Livewire division of Cargo Records. Their album Flog It was released in 2011, with a second album 10 Tales from the Gin Palace released in 2014.

In 2016, Eden joined Ariel Bender, also known as Luther Grosvenor, the guitarist for Mott the Hoople and Spooky Tooth. Eden toured with the Ariel Bender Band, supporting Rod Stewart in 2007. He appears on the Mott the Hoople Family Anthology album, and Luther’s 2011 album, If You Dare.

In 2019, Eden toured with Peter Doherty of The Libertines in support of Peter's project Puta Madres, culminating in a date at London Forum that year.

In 2023, Eden released his debut solo album as an independent artist with Cargo Records, entitled Marc Eden.
