= Razz (band) =

German rock band

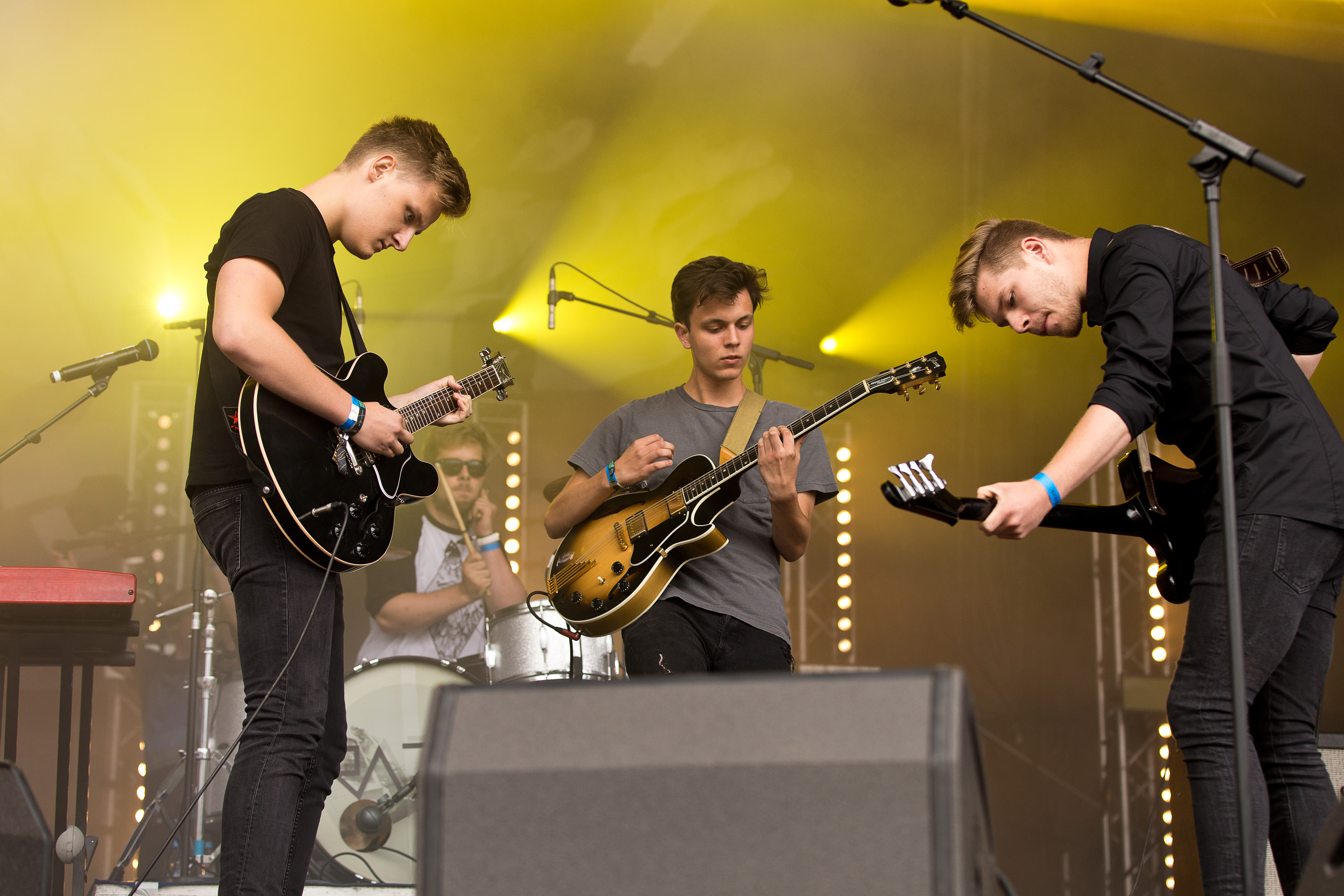
- RAZZ Rocken am Brocken 2016

Background information
- Origin: Twist (Emsland), Germany
- Genre: Indie rock
- Years active: 2011–present
- Members: Niklas Keiser Singer and Guitar; Christian Knippen Guitar; Lukas Bruns Bass; Steffen Pott Drummer
- Website: https://www.razz-music.com/

Razz (proper spelling: RAZZ) is an indie rock band from the municipality of Twist, Lower Saxony, Germany. The band members are Niklas Keiser (singer), Steffen Pott (drums), Christian Knippen (guitar) and Lukas Bruns (bass).

== History ==
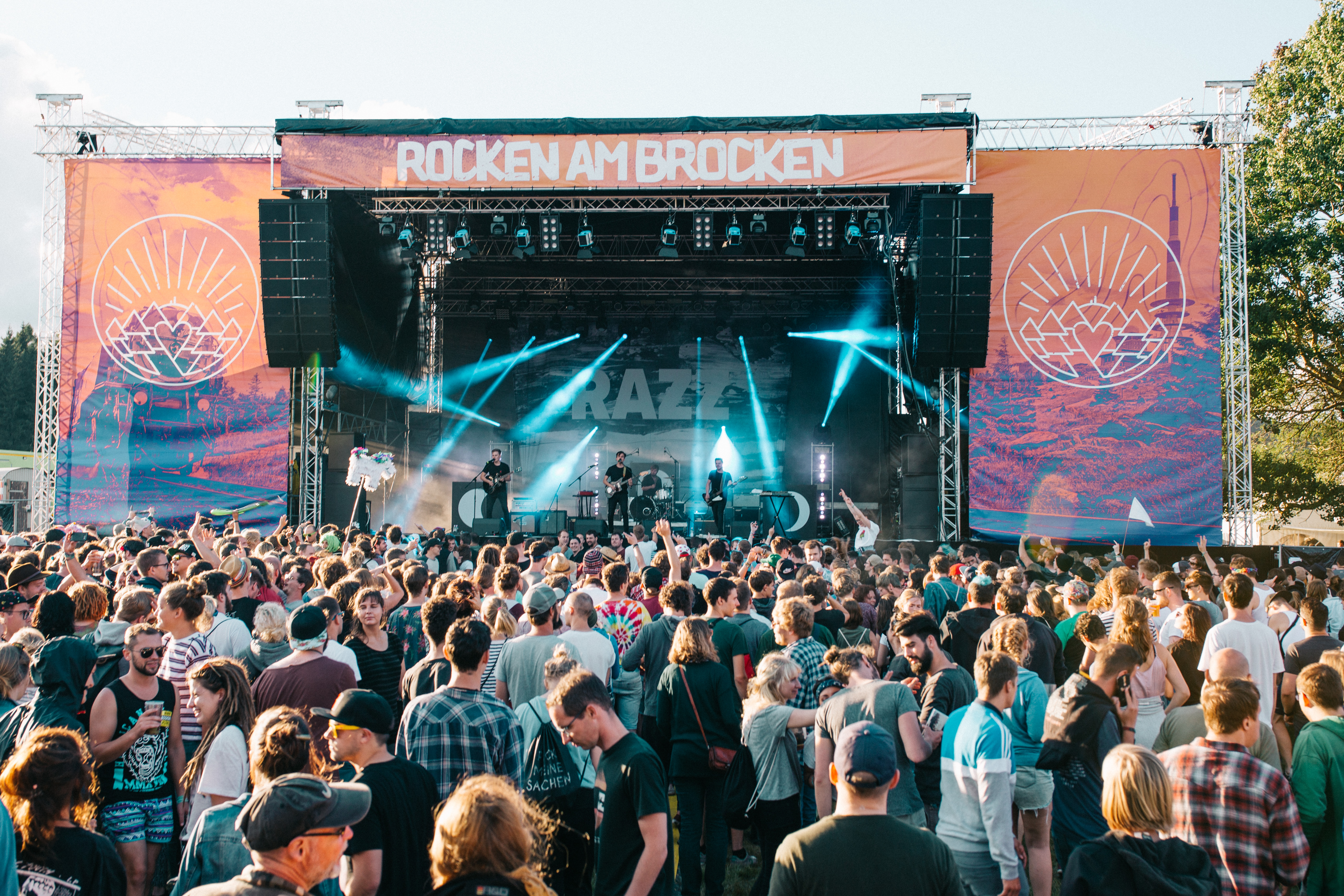
Razz at the Rocken am Brocken Festival 2017

The band was founded in May 2011. They played their first concert with self-written songs at the Abifestival 2012 in Lingen (Ems).

In 2013, they performed as the opening act on the Tour of Alex Clare. They also performed at various festivals in 2013 and 2014, such as the Hurricane Festival, the Open Flair Festival, Lollapalooza in Berlin, the Deichbrand Festival or the Reeperbahn Festival. In 2014, they received the newcomer award by Radio Fritz.

The first single "Black Feathers" was released in July 2015. The second single "Youth And Enjoyment" and their debut album With Your Hands We'll Conquer were released in October 2015. The album was listed in the German album charts for one week and reached number 69 Their first independent concert tour took place in 2015–16 at several places all around Germany.

During the process of their first album release, they appeared on 14 December 2015 live on TV in the show Circus HalliGalli as "the band from the phone box" as well as in an episode of the German TV series Gute Zeiten, schlechte Zeiten. In early 2016, Razz supported the Chemnitz rock band Kraftklub at two of their concerts.

In 2017, they were the opening act at Jimmy Eat World's German concerts and played at the Rock am Ring and Rock im Park festivals for the first time.

The second studio album Nocturnal was released in September 2017, produced by Stephen Street. The album stayed in the German charts for one week, and reached place 55.

After the album's release, they played concerts in Germany, Austria and Switzerland as headliners and as support band for Mando Diao.

In 2019, Razz supported the English indie rock band Bloc Party at two German concerts.

The EP Might Delete Later was released on 18 June 2021; the six tracks included the pre-released singles "1969 - Conrad, Like You" and "Game".

== Style ==
Razz play an experimental mix of alternative indie and rock. They combine garage rock, a little rock 'n' roll and blues rock with modern beats. Razz are often compared to the Kings of Leon.

== Discography ==
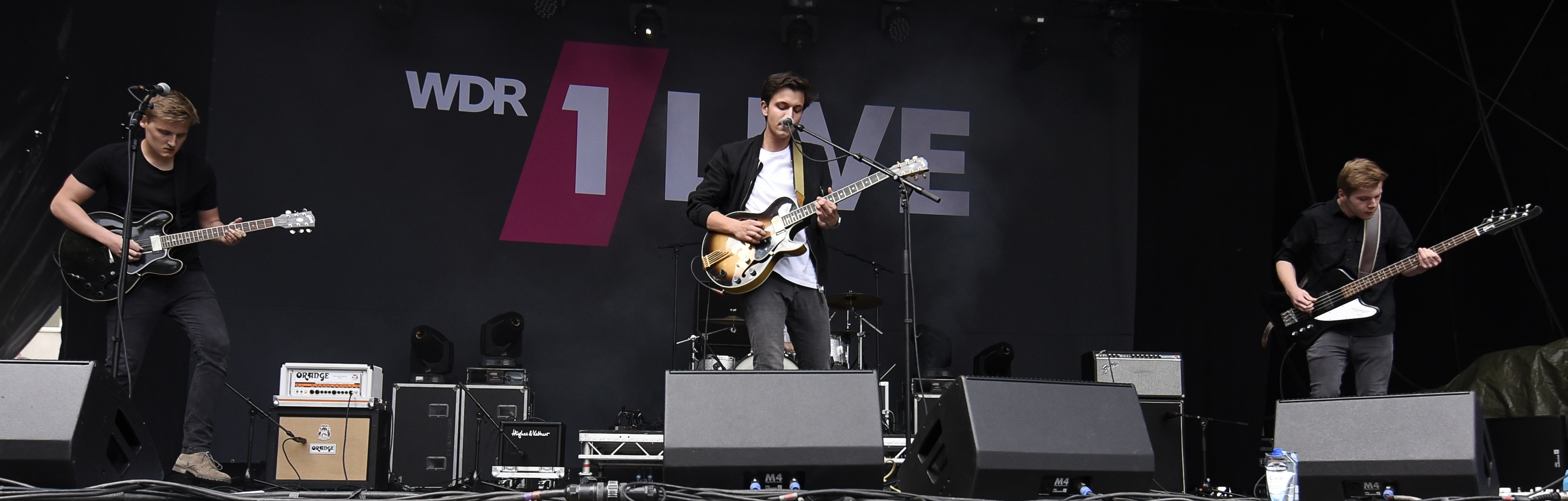
Razz at the Bochum Total Festival 2016

=== Studio albums ===
Year	Title	Published	Label
2015	With Your Hands We'll Conquer	30 October 2015	Long Branch Records / SPV
2017	Nocturnal	8 September 2017	Long Branch Records / SPV
2022	Everything You Will Ever Need	15 July 2022	Razz

=== EPs ===
Year	Title	Published	Label
2018	Nocturnal - Bonus Tracks	13 April 2018	Long Branch Records / SPV
2021	Might Delete Later	18 June 2021	Razz

=== Singles ===
Year	Title	Published	Album/ EP	Label
2015	Black Feathers	3 July 2015	With Your Hands We'll Conquer	Long Branch Records / SPV
2015	Youth And Enjoyment	30 October 2015	With Your Hands We'll Conquer	Long Branch Records / SPV
2017	Paralysed	16 June 2017	Nocturnal	Long Branch Records / SPV
2020	1969 – Conrad	4 December 2020	Might Delete Later	Razz
2021	Like You	26 February 2021	Might Delete Later	Razz
2021	Game	30 April 2021	Might Delete Later	Razz
2021	Everything I'll Ever Need	16 December 2021		Razz
