= Arachidonylcyclopropylamide =

Names
- Preferred IUPAC name (5Z,8Z,11Z,14Z)-N-(Cyclopropyl)icosa-5,8,11,14-tetraenamide
- Other names ACPA

Identifiers
CAS Number	229021-64-1
3D model (JSmol)	Interactive image
ChEMBL	ChEMBL418353
ChemSpider	4470548
IUPHAR/BPS	739
PubChem CID	5311007
CompTox Dashboard (EPA)	DTXSID30400110
- InChI: InChI=1S/C23H37NO/c1-2-3-4-5-6-7-8-9-10-11-12-13-14-15-16-17-18-19-23(25)24-22-20-21-22/h6-7,9-10,12-13,15-16,22H,2-5,8,11,14,17-21H2,1H3,(H,24,25)/b7-6-,10-9-,13-12-,16-15- Key: GLGAUBPACOBAMV-DOFZRALJSA-N; InChI=1/C23H37NO/c1-2-3-4-5-6-7-8-9-10-11-12-13-14-15-16-17-18-19-23(25)24-22-20-21-22/h6-7,9-10,12-13,15-16,22H,2-5,8,11,14,17-21H2,1H3,(H,24,25)/b7-6-,10-9-,13-12-,16-15- Key: GLGAUBPACOBAMV-DOFZRALJBJ
- SMILES: O=C(NC1CC1)CCC\C=C/C\C=C/C\C=C/C\C=C/CCCCC

Properties
Chemical formula	C_{23}H_{37}NO
Molar mass	343.555 g·mol^{−1}
Solubility in other solvents	soluble in ethanol, chloroform, THF and DMSO
- Except where otherwise noted, data are given for materials in their standard state (at 25 °C [77 °F], 100 kPa). (what is ?) Infobox references

Arachidonylcyclopropylamide (ACPA) is a synthetic agonist of the cannabinoid receptor 1 (CB1R). ACPA is considered to be a selective cannabinoid agonist as it binds primarily to the CB1R and has low affinity to the cannabinoid receptor 2 (CB2R) (K_{i} = 2.2 nM for CB1R; K_{i} = 700 nM for CB2R).
