= Arts and College Preparatory Academy =

Charter high school in Ohio, United States

Coordinates: 39.9340°N 82.8743°W

Information
- Established: 2002; 24 years ago
- Staff: 14 (support staff)
- Teaching staff: 27
- Grades: 7-12
- Enrollment: 480
- Website: artcollegeprep.org

The Arts and College Preparatory Academy (ACPA) is a tuition-free, public, charter high school in Columbus, Ohio, United States.

The school serves students in grades 7–12. It was founded in 2002. It is a model charter school combining academics and interdisciplinary arts instruction. The school has a population of 480 students with wait lists in each grade. Fifty-five percent (55%) of ACPA students come from families living below the federal poverty line. The 480 students are served by 27 full-time faculty and 14 supporting staff. ACPA is administrated by a superintendent, principal, and vice principal.
