= Air Canada Pilots Association =

Trade union

- Predecessor: Canadian Air Line Pilots Association
- Merged into: Air Line Pilots Association, International
- Formation: November 1995
- Dissolved: 2023
- Type: Trade union
- Headquarters: Mississauga, Ontario, Canada
- Location: Canada
- Members: 4,300
- Affiliations: Canadian Labour Congress; International Federation of Air Line Pilots' Associations
- Website: acpa.ca

Air Canada Pilots Association was a Canadian labour union that represented pilots at Air Canada and Air Canada Rouge. ACPA was formed when the pilots of Air Canada voted to leave the Canadian Air Line Pilots Association in a vote tabulated 9 November 1995. 94.8% of eligible voters resoundingly rejected CALPA giving 1,146 votes to ACPA and 366 votes to CALPA. Contract negotiations commenced with Air Canada immediately. In May 2023 ACPA was absorbed by ALPA (Air Line Pilots Association).
