= The Church discography =

- Peter Koppes, Steve Kilbey, Tim Powles, Marty Willson-Piper of The Church. Park West, Chicago, United States. 18 August 2006.
- Studio albums: 25
- Extended plays: 4
- Live albums: 1
- Compilation albums: 12
- Singles: 38
- Video albums: 3

The Church, an Australian psychedelic rock band, formed in Sydney in 1980. They have released 28 studio albums, numerous singles and other releases and an additional studio album under the name "The Refo:mation". This discography lists their original Australian releases, along with significant overseas compilations and singles.

Three of the albums listed under the studio albums section are outtake collections:

- Parallel Universe, a 2-CD set with one CD (remixture) consisting of radically remixed versions of tracks from After Everything Now This, while the other (mixture) consists of outtakes from that album
- Beside Yourself consists of outtakes from the sessions for the studio album Forget Yourself.
- Back with Two Beasts consists of outtakes from the Uninvited, Like the Clouds album sessions.

Note in the compilations section: Temperature Drop in Downtown Winterland, a UK-only tour tie-in EP, collects previously released A & B sides; Hindsight features tracks from the band's albums up to 1987, plus hitherto-uncollected B-sides of singles to that date; Tin Mine features one otherwise unavailable studio track, "Leverage".

== Studio albums ==
Year	Album details	Chart peak positions							Certifications (sales thresholds)
Year	Album details	AUS	CAN	NZ	SWE	UK Ind.	US	US Ind.	Certifications (sales thresholds)
1981	Of Skins and Heart: Released: 13 April 1981; Label: EMI Parlophone (PCSO 7582, TC PCSO-7583); Formats: LP, cassette	22	31	7	13	—	—	—	
1982	The Blurred Crusade: Released: 25 March 1982; Label: EMI Parlophone (PCSO 7585, 256-4300504); Formats: LP, cassette	10	—	17	24	—	—	—	
1983	Seance: Released: 13 June 1983; Label: EMI Parlophone (PCSO 7590, TC-PCSO 7590); Formats: LP, cassette	18	—	35	41	18	—	—	
1985	Heyday: Released: November 1985; Label: EMI Parlophone (PCSO.430034); Formats: LP, cassette	19	—	—	—	—	146	—	
1988	Starfish: Released: 16 February 1988; Label: Mushroom (RML53266, CD-53266); Formats: LP, cassette, CD	11	70	11	45	—	41	—	RIAA: Gold
1990	Gold Afternoon Fix: Released: 22 February 1990; Label: Mushroom (TVL93321, RMC 53321, D53321); Formats: LP, cassette, CD	12	79	28	44	—	66	—	
1992	Priest=Aura: Released: 10 March 1992; Label: White (TVD93356 / RMD53356); Formats: Cassette, CD	25	—	—	—	—	176	—	
1994	Sometime Anywhere: Released: 31 May 1994; Label: White (TVD93396); Formats: 2×cassette, 2×CD	27	—	—	—	—	—	—	
1996	Magician Among the Spirits: Released: 12 August 1996; Label: Deep Karma/White (D31562); Formats: CD	74	—	—	—	—	—	—	
1998	Hologram of Baal: Released: 8 September 1998; Label: Festival (D31886); Formats: 2×CD	68	—	—	—	—	—	—	
1999	A Box of Birds: Released: 21 September 1999; Label: Festival (D32123); Formats: CD	—	—	—	—	—	—	—	
2002	After Everything Now This: Released: 2002; Label: Cooking Vinyl (COOKCD209); Formats: CD	133	—	—	—	—	—	—	
2002	Parallel Universe: Released: 4 November 2002; Label: Cooking Vinyl (COOKCD248); Formats: 2×CD	—	—	—	—	—	—	—	
2003	Forget Yourself: Released: 27 October 2003; Label: Cooking Vinyl (COOKCD264); Formats: CD	145	—	—	—	—	—	42	
2004	Jammed: Released: 30 August 2004; Label: None (self-released); Formats: CD	—	—	—	—	—	—	—	
2004	Beside Yourself: Released: 4 October 2004; Label: Cooking Vinyl (COOKCD329A); Formats: CD	—	—	—	—	—	—	—	
2004	El Momento Descuidado (The Unguarded Moment): Released: 29 November 2004; Label: Liberation Blue (BLUE073.2); Formats: CD	—	—	—	—	—	—	—	
2005	Back with Two Beasts: Released: 4 November 2005; Label: None (self-released); Formats: CD	—	—	—	—	—	—	—	
2006	Uninvited, Like the Clouds: Released: 20 March 2006; Label: Liberation Music (LIBCD7191.2); Formats: CD	153	—	—	—	—	—	—	
2007	El Momento Siguiente (The Following Moment): Released: 3 February 2007; Label: Liberation Blue (BLUE143.2); Formats: CD	176	—	—	—	—	—	—	
2008	Shriek: Excerpts from the Soundtrack: Released: 2008; Label: Unorthodox (UNO 001); Formats: CD, digital download	—	—	—	—	—	—	—	
2009	Untitled #23: Released: 6 March 2009; Label: Unorthodox (UNO 004); Formats: CD, digital download, 2×LP	—	—	—	—	—	—	—	
2014	Further/Deeper: Released: 17 October 2014; Label: Unorthodox (UNO 011); Formats: CD, digital download, 2×LP	50	—	—	—	—	—	—	
2017	Man Woman Life Death Infinity: Released: 6 October 2017; Label: Unorthodox (UNO 012); Formats: CD, digital download, limited edition white LP	64	—	—	—	—	—	—	
2023	The Hypnogogue: Released: 24 February 2023; Label: Communicating Vessels	—	—	—	—	—	—	—	
2024	Eros Zeta and the Perfumed Guitars: Released: 29 March 2024; Label: Easy Action	—	—	—	—	—	—	—	
2026	Lacuna: Released: 6 November 2026; Label: Cooking Vinyl	35	—	—	—	—	—	—	
"—" denotes releases that did not chart or were not released in that territory.

== Live albums ==
Year	Album details
2014	A Psychedelic Symphony: Live at Sydney Opera House: Released: 16 May 2014; Label: Unorthodox (UNO 010); Formats: 2×CD, digital download
2019	New York Stories (Live 1988): Released: 12 Aug 2019; Label: Taurus Records; Formats: Digital download

== Compilations ==
Year	Album details	Chart peak positions
Year	Album details	AUS
1982	Temperature Drop in Downtown Winterland: Released: 3 November 1982; Territory: United Kingdom; Label: Carrere Records (CAR 257); Formats: 10"	—
1984	Remote Luxury: Released: October 1984; Territory: United States; Label: Warner Bros. Records (1-25152, 25152-4); Formats: LP, cassette	—
1988	Hindsight 1980-1987: Released: July 1988; Label: EMI Australia (PCSO 430060/1, TCPCSO 430060/1, CD-53266); Formats: 2×LP, 2×Cassette, 2×CD	36
1988	Life Before Starfish: Released: 1988; Territory: United States; Label: Arista Records (APCD-9724); Formats: CD	—
1988	Conception: Released: 1988; Territory: Europe; Label: Carrere Records (CAL 229, CDCAL 229); Formats: LP, CD	—
1991	A Quick Smoke at Spot's (Archives 1986–1990): Released: May 1991; Label: Mushroom Records (D 26058); Formats: LP, cassette, CD	84
1994	Almost Yesterday 1981–1990: Released: 1994; Label: Raven Records (RVCD-43); Formats: CD	124
1999	Under the Milky Way: The Best of the Church: Released: 28 September 1999; Territory: United States; Label: Buddha Records (7446599652-2); Formats: CD	190
1999	The Best of the Church: Released: 16 November 1999; Label: Mushroom Records (MUSH332332); Formats: CD	—
2001	Sing-Songs//Remote Luxury//Persia: Released: 15 October 2001; Label: EMI Australia (7243 5 35583 2 1); Formats: CD	—
2006	Tin Mine: Released: 20 March 2006; Label: Liberation Music (TINMINE001); Formats: CD	—
2007	Deep in the Shallows: The Classic Singles Collection: Released: 14 July 2007; Label: EMI Australia (0946 3 90442 2 1); Formats: 2×CD	—
2010	The Best of the Radio Songs: Released: 22 October 2010; Label: EMI Australia (9181882); Formats: CD	107
2026	Los Mejores Momentos: Released: 30 January 2026; Label: Mushroom (MUSH028LP); Formats: LP	82
"—" denotes releases that did not chart or were not released in that territory.

== Extended plays ==
Year	Details	Chart peak positions
Year	Details	AUS
1981	Too Fast for You: Released: July 1981; Label: EMI Parlophone (A-536, A-525); Formats: 2×7" single	—
1982	Sing-Songs: Released: 8 December 1982; Label: EMI Parlophone (BUG 2); Formats: 12" EP	58
1984	Remote Luxury: Released: February 1984; Label: EMI Parlophone (BUG 5); Formats: 12" EP, cassette	32
1984	Persia: Released: August 1984; Label: EMI Parlophone (BUG.430017, TC-BUG 430017); Formats: 12" EP, cassette	47
"—" denotes releases that did not chart or were not released in that territory.

== Singles ==
Year	Title	Peak chart positions							Album
Year	Title	AUS	CAN	NZ	UK	US	US Main.	US Alt.	Album
1980	"She Never Said"	—	—	—	—	—	x	x	Of Skins and Heart
1981	"The Unguarded Moment"	22	—	19	—	—	—	x	Of Skins and Heart
1981	"Too Fast for You"	43	—	—	—	—	—	x	Too Fast for You EP
1981	"Tear It All Away"	81	—	—	—	—	—	x	Too Fast for You EP
1982	"Almost with You"	21	—	—	—	—	—	x	The Blurred Crusade
1982	"When You Were Mine"	77	—	—	—	—	—	x	The Blurred Crusade
1982	"I Am a Rock" / "A Different Man"; NZ / UK release	—	—	—	—	—	—	x	Sing-Songs EP
1983	"It's No Reason"	56	—	—	—	—	—	x	Seance
1983	"Electric Lash"	60	—	—	—	—	—	x	Seance
1985	"Already Yesterday"	100	—	—	—	—	—	x	Heyday
1986	"Tantalized"	62	—	—	—	—	—	x	Heyday
1986	"Columbus"	—	—	—	—	—	—	x	Heyday
1986	"Disenchanted"; UK-only release	—	—	—	—	—	—	x	Heyday
1988	"Under the Milky Way"	22	69	25	90	24	2	x	Starfish
1988	"Reptile"	94	88	—	—	—	27	x	Starfish
1988	"Antenna"; Spain-only release	—	—	—	—	—	—	x	Starfish
1988	"Destination"	—	—	—	—	—	—	—	Starfish
1990	"Metropolis"	19	—	41	—	—	11	1	Gold Afternoon Fix
1990	"Russian Autumn Heart"; US-only release	—	—	—	—	—	—	—	Gold Afternoon Fix
1990	"You're Still Beautiful"	95	—	—	—	—	—	27	Gold Afternoon Fix
1992	"Ripple"	62	—	—	—	—	—	3	Priest=Aura
1992	"Feel"	176	—	—	—	—	—	—	Priest=Aura
1994	"Two Places at Once"	151	—	—	—	—	—	—	Sometime Anywhere
1996	"Comedown"	156	—	—	—	—	—	—	Magician Among the Spirits
1997	"White Star Line" / "Gypsy Stomp"; Limited edition release: 1000 copies	—	—	—	—	—	—	—	Non-album release
1998	"Louisiana"	76	—	—	—	—	—	—	Hologram of Baal
2001	"Numbers"	144	—	—	—	—	—	—	After Everything Now This
2003	"Song in Space"; Limited edition release: 1500 copies	155	—	—	—	—	—	—	Forget Yourself
2006	"Block"	97	—	—	—	—	—	—	Uninvited, Like the Clouds
2006	"Easy"	—	—	—	—	—	—	—	Uninvited, Like the Clouds
2006	"Under the Milky Way" (vs Craig Obey)	—	—	—	—	—	—	—	Elektrik Force
2009	"The Coffee Song" / "Hounds of Love"	—	—	—	—	—	—	—	Non-album release
2009	"Pangaea"	—	—	—	—	—	—	—	Untitled #23
2009	"Operetta"	—	—	—	—	—	—	—	Untitled #23
2010	"Deadman's Hand"	—	—	—	—	—	—	—	Untitled #23
2017	"Another Century"	—	—	—	—	—	—	—	Man Woman Life Death Infinity
2017	"Undersea"	—	—	—	—	—	—	—	Man Woman Life Death Infinity
2017	"I Don't Know How I Don't Know Why"	—	—	—	—	—	—	—	Man Woman Life Death Infinity
2022	"The Hypnogogue"	—	—	—	—	—	—	—	The Hypnogogue
2022	"C'est La Vie"	—	—	—	—	—	—	—	The Hypnogogue
2023	"No Other You"	—	—	—	—	—	—	—	The Hypnogogue
2023	"Realm of Minor Angels"	—	—	—	—	—	—	—	Eros Zeta and the Perfumed Guitars
2025	"Sacred Echoes (Part Two)"	—	—	—	—	—	—	—	Lacuna (forthcoming release)

== Video albums ==
Year	Details
2001	Enmore Theatre 1992 Concert: Released: 2001; Label: The Church (FAN001N, DVD001N); Formats: VHS, DVD
2013	Future Past Perfect: Live at the Enmore: Released: 1 August 2013; Label: Unorthodox/Moshcam (DVD-FPP-2013); Formats: 3xDVD
2014	A Psychedelic Symphony: Live at Sydney Opera House: Released: 16 May 2014; Label: Unorthodox (UNODVD 010); Formats: DVD

== Studio album as The Refo:mation ==
Year	Album details
1997	Pharmakoi/Distance-Crunching Honchos with Echo Units: Released: 1997; Label: Phantom Records (REFO 001); Formats: CD
