= Untitled 23 =

2009 studio album by the Church

Untitled #23

Studio album by The Church
- Released: 6 March 2009
- Recorded: Spacejunk III Studios, The Orange Room; Sydney, New South Wales 2008–2009
- Genres: Alternative rock, neo-psychedelia, psychedelic rock, dream pop
- Length: 50:28
- Labels: Unorthodox, Second Motion
- Producer: The Church

The Church chronology
Shriek: Excerpts from the Soundtrack (2008)	Untitled #23 (2009)	Further/Deeper (2014)

Professional ratings
Review scores
Source	Rating
AllMusic	link
Pitchfork	(7.0/10)

Untitled #23 is the 23rd album by the Australian alternative rock band The Church, released in March 2009. It was their 23rd Australian album-length collection of original studio recordings, counting the four outtakes albums (A Quick Smoke at Spot's, Parallel Universe, Beside Yourself & Back with Two Beasts), the covers album A Box of Birds and the acoustic albums El Momento Descuidado & El Momento Siguiente.

The album was released on the band's own label, Unorthodox Records, in Australia and on Second Motion Records in North America. Praised for its moody yet strong songwriting, it has yielded some of The Church's best reviews of their career, including a 5 star review from Australia's Rolling Stone.

== Singles ==
In March, 2009, the band released a teaser EP entitled "Pangaea", featuring the title track and three outtakes: "LLC", "Insanity" and "So Love May Find Us", which featured lead vocal contributions from Koppes and Willson-Piper.

Untitled #23 was released almost simultaneously with the "Pangaea" EP on 6 March 2009.

The "Operetta" EP followed on 27 November and included the title track plus three jams/outtakes from the Untitled #23 recording sessions: "Silhouette in Meltdown", "Moon Hangs in Black" and "Particles Matter".

In April 2010 the band embarked on their 30th Anniversary tour, playing an all-acoustic set chronicling one song from each album played in reverse order. At each show, a full color retrospective program was distributed to each audience member, along with the third EP from Untitled #23, "Deadman's Hand", which contained the title track plus four outtakes: "Stardust", "The Kicker", "Dakota" and "The Garden".

== Live performances ==
In June 2009 the band launched the "So Love May Find Us Tour 2009", a month-long tour of the United States and Canada in support of Untitled #23. The tour's name derived from the 17-minute track of the same name from the "Pangaea" EP.

In 2011 the album, along with Priest=Aura and Starfish, was played in its entirety on the band's 30th Anniversary "Future, Past, Perfect" tour.

== Track listing ==
All songs written by Kilbey/Koppes/Powles/Willson-Piper

1. "Cobalt Blue" – 4:16
2. "Deadman's Hand" –4:28
3. "Pangaea" – 4:05
4. "Happenstance" – 4:25
5. "Space Saviour" – 5:34
6. "On Angel Street" – 6:19
7. "Sunken Sun" – 5:48
8. "Anchorage" – 6:28
9. "Lunar" – 3:25
10. "Operetta" – 5:46

=== Vinyl edition ===
The vinyl edition of the album contains three bonus tracks, all from the Pangaea EP: "So Love May Find Us", "LLC" (sung by Peter Koppes), and "Insanity" (sung by Marty Willson-Piper). The limited edition double vinyl LP was released through Second Motion and the band's own Unorthodox Records.

== Personnel ==
- Steve Kilbey – lead vocals, bass guitar, keyboards, guitar
- Peter Koppes – guitars, keyboards, bass guitar, backing vocals
- Tim Powles – drums, backing vocals, guitar
- Marty Willson-Piper – guitars, bass guitar, drums, backing vocals

with:

- Jordan Brebach – orchestral guitar on 7, backing vocals and percussion on "LLC" (vinyl-only bonus track)
- Michael Bridge – violins on "So Love May Find Us" (vinyl-only bonus track)
- Sophie Glasson – cello on 3, 8 and "So Love May Find Us" (vinyl-only bonus track)
- Jane Grigg – backing vocals on "LLC" (vinyl-only bonus track)
- Russell Grigg – backing vocals on "LLC" (vinyl-only bonus track)
- Shelley Harland – chorus vocals on 8
- Patti Hood – harp on 3 and "So Love May Find Us" (vinyl-only bonus track)
- Frank Kearns – 12-string guitar on 2, bass on 6, ambient electric guitar on 10
- David Trump – Electone organ on 3, acoustic guitar on 10
