= El Momento Siguiente =

Studio album by the Church
- Released: 3 February 2007
- Recorded: November–December 2006
- Studio: Rancom Street Studios, Sydney
- Genre: Alternative rock; psychedelic folk; acoustic rock
- Label: Liberation
- Producer: The Church

The Church chronology
Uninvited, Like the Clouds (2006)	El Momento Siguiente (2007)	Shriek: Excerpts from the Soundtrack (2008)

El Momento Siguiente is the 21st album by the Australian psychedelic rock band the Church and their second in the Liberation Acoustic Series, following 2005's El Momento Descuidado. The title translates from Spanish as "The Following Moment".

The album, released in February 2007, consists of newly recorded acoustic versions of previously released songs, plus three new compositions and a cover of the Triffids' "Wide Open Road". It was reissued in 2009 on the band's own Unorthodox Records label.

== Reception ==
Professional ratings
Review scores
Source	Rating
AllMusic	4/5 stars
PopMatters	6/10 stars

AllMusic's Ned Raggett gave El Memento Siguiente four stars out of five: he opined that "arguably much of the interest in [this album] lies in what the band chose this time around; as before, the group wisely looks through most of its career... [it] shows that the band's considerable skills seem only to improve; the rich feeling of so many of the performances belies the deathly dull label of 'going acoustic' as has so often been the case with other acts."

John Bergstrom of PopMatters rated it at six out of ten and explained, that it "is another welcome opportunity to experience some excellent musicians playing generally excellent songs in a new light. Stripped of the sometimes gauzy production of their regular albums, the Church sound as vital as you might have forgotten they've always been."

== Track listing ==
No.	Title	Origin	Length
1.	"Wide Open Road"	Born Sandy Devotional, 1986	3:43
2.	"It's No Reason"	Seance, 1983	5:42
3.	"Reptile"	Starfish, 1988	5:35
4.	"Tantalized"	Heyday, 1985	3:30
5.	"Electric Lash"	Seance, 1983	3:22
6.	"After Everything"	After Everything Now This, 2002	5:33
7.	"Song in the Afternoon"	New song	3:30
8.	"Two Places at Once"	Sometime Anywhere, 1994	8:07
9.	"Appalatia"	Forget Yourself, 2003	3:50
10.	"Bordello"	New song	4:02
11.	"Pure Chance"	Uninvited, Like the Clouds, 2006	5:56
12.	"Grind"	Gold Afternoon Fix, 1990	7:17
13.	"NSEW (North, South, East, And West)"	Starfish, 1988	3:29
14.	"Comeuppance"	New instrumental	3:12

== Personnel ==
The Church

- Steve Kilbey – lead vocals, bass guitar, keyboards, guitar
- Peter Koppes – guitars, keyboards, bass guitar, vocals
- Tim Powles – drums, percussion, backing vocals
- Marty Willson-Piper – guitars, bass guitar, vocals

Additional musicians

- Jorden Brebach – bass guitar (tracks 7 & 10)
- Amanda Brown – violin (racks 2, 6 & 8), melodica (track 9)
- Sophie Glasso – cello (tracks 2, 4, 6 & 8)
- Tiare Helberg – piano (track 12), percussion (track 10)
- Inga Liljeström – vocals (tracks 4 & 11)

Production and artwork

- William Bowden – mastering at King Willy Sound
- Petra Bright, Tiare Helberg, Peter Koppes, Rodney Navarre
- The Church – producer
- Ben Garrard – assistant engineer
- Ted Howard – recording, mixing at Rancom Street Studios, Botany Bay, Sydney
- Steve Kilbey – painting
- Samantha McFadden – design

== Charts ==
Chart (2007)	Peak position
Australian Albums (ARIA)	176
