= El Momento Descuidado =

2004 studio album by the Church

Studio album by the Church
- Released: 29 November 2004
- Genre: Alternative rock, psychedelic folk, acoustic rock
- Length: 55:21
- Label: Liberation, Cooking Vinyl
- Producer: The Church

The Church chronology
Beside Yourself (2004)	El Momento Descuidado (2004)	Back with Two Beasts (2005)

El Momento Descuidado (a Spanish rendering of "The Unguarded Moment") is the eighteenth album by the Australian psychedelic rock band the Church, released in November 2004.

The album followed the outtakes compilation Beside Yourself by only a month. This time, the band decided to revisit past material in an all-acoustic setting, along with five new songs. For the first time in years, they performed "The Unguarded Moment" (albeit in strongly modified form), an early hit from which they had long distanced themselves. As a nod to the song's reappearance, they titled the album El Momento Descuidado—a rough Spanish translation of its name. A short all-acoustic tour followed the release in late 2004.

The album was nominated for a 2005 ARIA Music Award for Best Adult Contemporary album, but it lost to the Go-Betweens' Oceans Apart. James Christopher Monger at AllMusic praised the album's "intimacy and intensity", stating that "for musicians who have made a career out of dreamy, reverb-drenched landscapes ... that they've finally reduced these songs to the point of clarity is both triumphant and long overdue."

Professional ratings
Review scores
Source	Rating
AllMusic	4/5 stars

== Track listing ==
No.	Title	Origin	Length
1.	"The Unguarded Moment"	Of Skins and Heart, 1981	3:36
2.	"0408"	New song	5:20
3.	"Almost with You"	The Blurred Crusade, 1982	4:29
4.	"November"	New song	3:15
5.	"Metropolis"	Gold Afternoon Fix, 1990	3:21
6.	"Chromium"	After Everything Now This, 2002	3:44
7.	"Sealine"	Forget Yourself, 2003	2:39
8.	"A New Season"	Starfish, 1988	3:44
9.	"All I Know"	New song	4:19
10.	"Til the Cows Come Home"	New song	3:15
11.	"Tristesse"	Heyday, 1985	4:06
12.	"Under the Milky Way"	Starfish, 1988	4:52
13.	"Invisible"	After Everything Now This, 2002	5:25
14.	"Between Mirages"	New instrumental	3:18

== Personnel ==
- Steve Kilbey – lead vocals, bass guitar, keyboards, guitar
- Peter Koppes – guitars, keyboards, bass guitar, harmonica, vocals (8)
- Tim Powles – drums, percussion, backing vocals
- Marty Willson-Piper – guitars, bass guitar, vocals (6 & 11)
