= Magician Among the Spirits =

1996 album by The Church

Studio album by The Church
- Released: 12 August 1996
- Recorded: 1996
- Genre: Alternative rock; neo-psychedelia; psychedelic rock; dream pop
- Length: 66:59
- Label: Deep Karma; White
- Producer: The Church; Simon Polinski

The Church chronology
Sometime Anywhere (1994)	Magician Among the Spirits (1996)	Pharmakoi/Distance-Crunching Honchos with Echo Units (1997)

Professional ratings
Review scores
Source	Rating
AllMusic	4/5 stars

Magician Among the Spirits is the tenth album by the Australian alternative rock band The Church, released in August 1996. The album title was inspired by a book written by Harry Houdini and C. M. Eddy, Jr. (uncredited) in 1924, in which the famed magician discussed his investigations of spirit mediums. A photographic negative of Houdini is incorporated as the centrepiece of the album artwork. The album was reissued with a revised track listing as Magician Among the Spirits Plus Some in 1999.

Without a recording deal after Sometime Anywhere, the band's future looked bleak as Kilbey and Willson-Piper began work on new recordings in 1995. Although initially a two-man project, the new material saw input from new drummer Tim Powles and hired violinist Linda Neil. Renewed contact between Kilbey and Peter Koppes led to the latter agreeing to guest on four songs, despite having left the band in 1992. Simon Polinski (Yothu Yindi) was drafted in to co-produce, engineer and mix the sessions. The music saw a return to guitar-based material, infused with krautrock and art rock influences. A 15-minute atmospheric piece called "Magician Among the Spirits" dominated the sessions, featuring Koppes on guitar and split Kilbey/Willson-Piper vocals (as on "Two Places at Once"). Contributions from Utungun Percussion added a new, primal aspect to several songs.

The album was released on the band's own Deep Karma label but due to financial constraints they had to arrange outside distribution for markets in North America and Europe. This limitation almost doomed the album from the beginning, but worse events were to come. Within a short time, the U.S. distributor went bankrupt, leaving the band stripped of its earnings from North American sales. Although exact figures remain unknown due to disputes, up to A$250,000 worth of merchandise (some 25,000 discs) was lost. For a band already on shaky foundations, this was nearly the death knell. Comments by Kilbey in May of that year summed up the situation: "There's no immediate future for The Church ... Our management, the whole thing is broken down ... We don't really have a label. We're owed lots and lots of money and we're broke. We're trying to pursue lawyers to get our money back. Marty and I aren't having any communication. There's no one really managing us so ... that could have been the last record."

== Original 1996 track listing ==
All tracks are written by Steve Kilbey and Marty Willson-Piper, except where noted.

No.	Title	Writer(s)	Length
1.	"Welcome"		5:58
2.	"Comedown"	Kilbey	4:35
3.	"Ritz"	Steve Harley	7:54
4.	"Grandiose" (instrumental)	Kilbey; Willson-Piper; Peter Koppes; Tim Powles; Linda Neil	5:21
5.	"Ladyboy"	Kilbey; Willson-Piper; Powles	5:56
6.	"It Could Be Anyone"		8:45
7.	"The Further Adventures of the Time Being"	Kilbey; Willson-Piper; Powles	6:00
8.	"Romany Caravan" (instrumental)	Kilbey; Willson-Piper; Powles; Neil	4:06
9.	"Magician Among the Spirits"	Kilbey; Willson-Piper; Koppes; Powles	14:08
10.	"Afterimage" (instrumental)		4:16
Total length:			66:59

== Magician Among the Spirits Plus Some ==
Magician Among the Spirits Plus Some

Studio album by The Church
- Released: 16 February 1999
- Genre: Alternative rock; neo-psychedelia; psychedelic rock; dream pop
- Length: 79:48
- Label: Cooking Vinyl; Thirsty Ear
- Producer: The Church; Simon Polinski

The Church chronology
Hologram of Baal (1998)	Magician Among the Spirits Plus Some (1999)	A Box of Birds (1999)

Magician Among the Spirits Plus Some is a 1999 expanded reissue of The Church's 1996 album, Magician Among the Spirits. It replaces the Cockney Rebel cover "Ritz" with four tracks from the "Comedown" single. In the US, the expanded album bears the title Magician Among the Spirits and Some.

=== 1999 version track listing ===
All tracks are written by Steve Kilbey and Marty Willson-Piper, except where noted.

No.	Title	Writer(s)	Length
1.	"Welcome"		5:58
2.	"Comedown"	Kilbey	4:35
3.	"Man"	Kilbey; Willson-Piper; Peter Koppes; Powles	5:24
4.	"Won't Let You Sleep"	Kilbey; Willson-Piper; Koppes; Powles	5:17
5.	"SADS"	Kilbey; Willson-Piper; Powles; Simon Polinski	4:09
6.	"Grandiose" (instrumental)	Kilbey; Willson-Piper; Koppes; Powles; Linda Neil	5:21
7.	"Ladyboy"	Kilbey; Willson-Piper; Powles	5:56
8.	"Why Don't You Love Me"	Kilbey; Willson-Piper; Powles	5:53
9.	"It Could Be Anyone"		8:45
10.	"The Further Adventures of the Time Being"	Kilbey; Willson-Piper; Powles	6:00
11.	"Romany Caravan" (instrumental)	Kilbey; Willson-Piper; Powles; Neil	4:06
12.	"Magician Among the Spirits"	Kilbey; Willson-Piper; Koppes; Powles	14:08
13.	"Afterimage" (instrumental)		4:16
Total length:			79:48

== Personnel ==
- Steve Kilbey – lead vocals, bass guitar, keyboards, guitar
- Marty Willson-Piper – guitars, bass guitar, backing vocals
- Tim Powles – drums, percussion, bass guitar, backing vocals

with

- Peter Koppes – guitars
- Linda Neil – violin

== Charts ==
Chart (1996)	Peak position
Australian Albums (ARIA Charts)	74
