= Jammed (album) =

Studio album by The Church
- Released: 30 August 2004
- Recorded: October 2003
- Genre: Alternative rock, psychedelic rock, post-rock, space rock
- Length: 58:44
- Label: None (self-released)
- Producer: The Church

The Church chronology
Forget Yourself (2003)	Jammed (2004)	Beside Yourself (2004)

Jammed is the sixteenth album by the Australian alternative rock band The Church, released in August 2004. It was their second album of entirely improvised material, following the Bastard Universe bonus disc from Hologram of Baal (September 1998) and consists of only two extremely long tracks. It was only available from the band's website or at their gigs.

== Track listing ==
All tracks by Kilbey/Koppes/Powles/Willson-Piper

1. "The Sexual Act" - 38:44 (instrumental)
2. "Interlock" - 20:00 (instrumental)

== Personnel ==
- Steve Kilbey – bass guitar
- Peter Koppes – guitar
- Tim Powles – drums, percussion
- Marty Willson-Piper – guitar
