= Beast with two backs =

Euphemistic metaphor for two persons engaged in sexual intercourse

Making the beast with two backs is a euphemistic metaphor for two people engaged in sexual intercourse. In English, the expression dates back to at least William Shakespeare's Othello (Act 1, Scene 1, ll. 126–127, c. 1601–1603):

I am one, sir, that comes to tell you your daughter and the Moor are now making the beast with two backs.

It refers to the situation in which a couple—in the missionary position, on their sides, kneeling, or standing—cling to each other as if a single creature, with their backs to the outside. The earliest known occurrence of the phrase is in Rabelais's Gargantua and Pantagruel (c. 1532) as the phrase la bête à deux dos. Thomas Urquhart translated Gargantua and Pantagruel into English, which was published posthumously around 1693.

In the vigour of his age he married Gargamelle, daughter to the King of the Parpaillons, a jolly pug, and well-mouthed wench. These two did oftentimes do the two-backed beast together, joyfully rubbing and frotting their bacon 'gainst one another.

== See also ==
- The Beast with Two Backs, a studio album by the goth rock band Inkubus Sukkubus.
- A Beast With Two Backs, a British television play first broadcast in 1968.
- Back with Two Beasts, an album by the Australian band The Church.
- Futurama: The Beast with a Billion Backs
