= Back with Two Beasts =

Studio album by the Church
- Released: 4 November 2005
- Genres: Alternative rock, neo-psychedelia, psychedelic rock, dream pop
- Length: 65:30
- Labels: None (original); Unorthodox (reissue)
- Producer: The Church

The Church chronology
El Momento Descuidado (2004)	Back with Two Beasts (2005)	Uninvited, Like the Clouds (2006)

Back with Two Beasts is the nineteenth album (and fourth collection of outtakes) by the Australian psychedelic rock band the Church, released in November 2005. The material was recorded during the Uninvited, Like the Clouds sessions but released first, as a teaser for that album, and was originally only available from the band's website or at their gigs. It was re-released by Unorthodox Records in 2009. The title is a play on the euphemism for sexual intercourse, "the beast with two backs", to which both of the track titles on the band's previous self-released album, Jammed, also referred.

== Track listing ==
All songs written by Kilbey/Koppes/Powles/Willson-Piper

1. "Snowfaller" – 5:41
2. "Pantechnicon" – 6:22
3. "Unreliable External" – 5:02
4. "Pearls" – 6:36
5. "Saturation" – 5:42
6. "Heading South" – 4:37
7. "Ionian Blues" – 3:40
8. "Anthem X" – 5:48
9. "Night Sequence" – 20:01
10. "I Don't Know" – 2:01

== Personnel ==
- Steve Kilbey – lead vocals, bass guitar, keyboards, guitar
- Peter Koppes – guitars, keyboards, bass guitar, backing vocals
- Tim Powles – drums, percussion, backing vocals
- Marty Willson-Piper – guitars, bass guitar, backing vocals
