= Forget Yourself =

Studio album by The Church
- Released: 27 October 2003
- Recorded: Spacejunk Studios, Australia
- Genres: Alternative rock, neo-psychedelia, psychedelic rock, dream pop
- Length: 67:45; 96:51 (U.S.)
- Labels: Cooking Vinyl, spinART
- Producers: Tim Powles, The Church and Nic Hard

The Church chronology
Parallel Universe (2002)	Forget Yourself (2003)	Jammed (2004)

Forget Yourself is the fifteenth album by the Australian alternative rock band The Church, released in October 2003. It was recorded at drummer Tim Powles' Spacejunk studios in Australia and features many straight-to-tape recordings with few overdubs.

Around the time of Parallel Universe's (late 2002) release, the Church returned to the studio to record another album, eventually entitled Forget Yourself. Rather than fleshing the songs out over a long, gradual process, the band decided to keep the music as close to the original jam-based material as possible. Stylistically, this made for a much rawer sound, primarily recorded live and with minimal overdubs. As had become routine since Sometime Anywhere (May 1994), songs saw numerous instrument changes between members, with Powles playing guitar on "Sealine" and Willson-Piper switching to drums on "Maya."

John D. Luersson at AllMusic described the album as "a timeless, magical disc that is easily as strong as anything from their 1980s peak", adding that "the real brilliance peeks through on lush numbers like 'Telepath,' 'Maya,' and 'June,' all boasting the ethereal moments that made early discs like Remote Luxury and Heyday fan favorites." The album peaked in the top 50 on Billboard component chart, Top Independent Albums.

Professional ratings
Review scores
Source	Rating
AllMusic	4/5 stars

== Track listing ==
All songs written by Kilbey/Koppes/Powles/Willson-Piper

1. "Sealine" – 5:06
2. "Song in Space" – 5:24
3. "The Theatre and Its Double" – 4:34
4. "Telepath" – 4:56
5. "See Your Lights" – 4:14
  - Vocals: Marty Willson-Piper
6. "Lay Low" – 4:13
7. "Maya" – 3:45
8. "Appalatia" – 4:09
  - Vocals: Peter Koppes
9. "June" – 4:05
10. "Don't You Fall" – 3:10
11. "I Kept Everything" – 4:01
12. "Nothing Seeker" – 4:22
13. "Reversal" – 4:41
14. "Summer" – 7:02

=== U.S. Bonus disc ===
All tracks from Beside Yourself

1. "Serpent Easy" – 14:44
2. "Cantilever" – 10:00
3. "Moodertronic" – 4:22

== Personnel ==
- Steve Kilbey – lead vocals, bass guitar, keyboards, guitar
- Peter Koppes – guitars, keyboards, bass guitar, backing vocals
- Tim Powles – drums, percussion, backing vocals, guitar
- Marty Willson-Piper – guitars, bass guitar, backing vocals, drums

== Charts ==
Chart (2003)	Peak position
Australian Albums (ARIA)	145
