= Man Woman Life Death Infinity =

2017 studio album by The Church

Studio album by the Church
- Released: 6 October 2017
- Genres: Alternative rock, neo-psychedelia, psychedelic rock
- Label: Unorthodox

The Church chronology
Further/Deeper (2014)	Man Woman Life Death Infinity (2017)	The Hypnogogue (2023)

Man Woman Life Death Infinity is the 25th album by the Australian alternative rock band the Church, released in October 2017.

The album was the second by the band to feature the lineup of Steve Kilbey, Peter Koppes, Tim Powles, and Ian Haug. Haug joined the band in 2013 following the departure of longtime guitarist Marty Willson-Piper, and, according to Powles, was "surprised to discover how much improvisation was involved in the writing process" of the band; Powles went on to note that Man Woman Life Death Infinity was a unique record for the band because prior to recording, they set aside time to structure the songs instead of relying largely upon improvisation during the recording process.

The album spawned two singles prior to its release. The first single, "Another Century", was released in June 2017. The album's second single, "Undersea", was released in September 2017.

== Critical reception ==
Professional ratings
Review scores
Source	Rating
AllMusic	4/5 stars
Cryptic Rock	4/5 stars
The Fire Note	3.5/5 stars
Glide	7/10
PopMatters	9/10

Matt Collar at AllMusic gave the album four stars, stating that it "sounds utterly fresh, even as it's in keeping with their early albums. Rather than backing away from the gothy, new wave psychedelia of their youth, just as they revisited The Blurred Crusade, here they've embraced that aesthetic and imbued it with the emotional maturity and poetic gravitas that comes with their decades-long space rock journey."

== Track listing ==
All tracks are written by Steve Kilbey, Peter Koppes, Tim Powles, Ian Haug.

No.	Title	Length
1.	"Another Century"	4:42
2.	"Submarine"	4:53
3.	"For King Knife"	4:28
4.	"Undersea"	3:20
5.	"Before the Deluge"	5:11
6.	"I Don't Know How I Don't Know Why"	3:46
7.	"A Face in a Film"	4:11
8.	"In Your Fog"	3:58
9.	"Something Out There Is Wrong"	4:48
10.	"Dark Waltz"	4:33

== Personnel ==
Credits are adapted from the CD liner notes of Man Woman Life Death Infinity on Unorthodox.

The Church

- Steve Kilbey – bass, Fender 6 guitar, keyboards, lead vocals
- Peter Koppes – acoustic and electric guitars, keyboards
- Tim Powles – drums, percussion, backing vocals, keyboards
- Ian Haug – acoustic and electric guitars, keyboards

Additional musicians

- Amanda Kramer – additional keyboards, backing vocals
