= The Sleep-ins =

Australian musical group

- Origin: Sydney, New South Wales, Australia
- Genre: Indie Rock
- Years active: 2003–present
- Label: 128 Records
- Members: Chad Corley; Stefan Pope; Josh Schuberth; Robert Peckyno
- Past members: Josh Lanham; Ben Price; Richard Ploog; Chris Colla; Mike Johnson; A.J. Donahue; Jeremy Rasik; Heath Metzger; James Butler
- Website: sleep-ins.one28.us

The Sleep-ins are an indie rock band formed in Sydney, Australia. They are signed to the US label 128 Records. The band gained notoriety with their 2010 album Songs About Girls & Outer Space, which charted on the CMJ New Music Report. "Silver State", the opening song from that album, appeared in the 2013 film As Cool As I Am.

== Overview ==
The band the Sleep-ins was formed by Sydney music store employees Chad Corley (guitar, vocals), Stefan Pope (bass, vocals), and Ben Price (guitar) in October 2003. The band's first drummer, Josh Lanham, was replaced in January 2004 by Josh Schuberth. Shortly thereafter, Schuberth was asked to tour with Genevieve Maynard of Stella One Eleven, leaving the band in temporary need of a replacement drummer, a role that was filled by former Church drummer Richard Ploog for several months. Schuberth returned later that year, and the band also replaced Ben Price with guitarist Chris Colla, who at the time was sharing a flat with Corley, Pope, and Regular John frontman Ryan Adamson.

The line-up of Corley, Pope, Schuberth, and Colla would remain intact for almost a year, independently releasing a single, "Silver State" backed with "Angelina (early bird mix)" in late 2004. However, Colla left the band in August 2005, forcing the Sleep-ins to take a break from performing while they sought another guitarist. Corley's friend Mike Johnson visited from the US in early 2006, and the band resumed performing with Johnson on guitar. By June of that year, however, both Johnson and Pope would face the imminent termination of their visas. As a result, Johnson returned to America and Pope returned to England. Faced with family issues and the departure of two of his bandmates, Corley decided to return to the US as well, effectively disbanding the Sleep-ins.

In 2010, Corley and Johnson reformed the Sleep-ins in Asheville, North Carolina, to tour in support of the album Songs About Girls & Outer Space, which was released on Corley's Ingot Rock label on 19 October 2010. The album consisted of recordings the band had made in Australia from 2004 to 2006, including the two songs – "Silver State" and "Angelina"—from the single the band had released in 2004. Corley and Johnson were joined by drummer A.J. Donahue and bassist Jeremy Rasik for a multi-state US tour. Mock Orange drummer Heath Metzger and bassist James Butler were the rhythm section for the band's final show of the tour in Nashville, Tennessee. Metzger had co-written some of the songs on the album, which was received positively by critics and charted on the CMJ New Music Report. The first track off the album, "Silver State", was featured on Magnet, and was included on the soundtrack for the 2013 film As Cool As I Am.

== Members ==
- Chad Corley – lead vocals, guitar, keyboards (2003–present)
- Stefan Pope – bass, keyboards, vocals (2003–present)
- Josh Schuberth – drums (2004–present)
- Robert Peckyno - piano, synths, vocals (2023-present)

=== Former members ===
- Josh Lanham – drums (2003)
- Ben Price – guitar (2003–2004)
- Richard Ploog – drums (2004)
- Chris Colla – guitar (2004–2005)
- Mike Johnson – guitar (2006–2022)
- A.J. Donahue – drums (2010)
- Jeremy Rasik – bass (2010)
- Heath Metzger – drums (2011)
- James Butler – bass (2011)

== Discography ==
=== Albums ===
- Songs About Girls & Outer Space (2010 – Ingot Rock)

=== Singles ===
- Silver State/Angelina (early bird mix) (2004 – Independent)

=== Soundtracks ===
- As Cool As I Am (2013 – IFC Films) – "Silver State"
