= Craig Obey =

Australian house producer

- Born: Australia
- Origin: Australia
- Occupations: Music producer; DJ
- Years active: 2000–present
- Labels: Hussle Recordings

Craig Obey is an Australian music producer who released one studio album in 2006. As a DJ, Obey has produced a number of mix compilations including A Night in the Life with Funk Corporation.

In 2000, Obey built the Grooveyard recording studio in Sydney and set up A Higher Sound Recordings, a label set up with Andrew Penhallow and film & media company, The Swish Group. The label signed Disco Montego and Waldo G.

== Discography ==
=== Albums ===
List of albums, with selected details
Title	Details
Elektrik Force	Released: 2006; Format: CD; Label: Hussle Recordings

=== Charting singles ===
List of singles, with selected chart positions
Title	Year	Peak chart positions
Title	Year	AUS
"Hip-Ma-Tize-Me" (featuring Chance)	2004	72
"Under the Milky Way" (vs. The Church)	2006	91
