= Lacuna (The Church album) =

Studio album by the Church
- Released: 6 November 2026
- Recorded: May 2024
- Length: 79:38
- Label: Cooking Vinyl

The Church chronology
Eros Zeta and the Perfumed Guitars (2024)	Lacuna (2026)

Singles from Lacuna
- 1. "Sacred Echoes (Part Two)" Released: November 2025; 2. "Western" b/w "Martian Skyline" Released: September 2026; 3. "Sky and Hill" / "Forever" Released: October 2026

Professional ratings
Review scores
Source	Rating
AllMusic	4/5 stars
Mojo	4/5 stars
Spill Magazine	4.5/5 stars

Lacuna is the 28th studio album by the Australian band the Church. It was released on 6 November 2026 through the label Cooking Vinyl.

== Singles and release ==
Lacuna was preceded by three singles. The first, "Sacred Echoes (Part Two)", was released in November 2025, before the album's official announcement. The song is an abridged version of "Sacred Echoes", the album's closing track. The second single, "Western", was released in September 2026, backed with "Martian Skyline". The following month, "Sky and Hill" and "Forever" were released together as a double single.

The album was previously announced to be released on 30 October 2026 through the record label Cooking Vinyl, but it was delayed to 6 November, one week later. It debuted on the ARIA Charts at no. 35.

== Track listing ==
Lacuna track listing
No.	Title	Length
1.	"Lumbini Grove"	6:52
2.	"Western"	3:02
3.	"Ferarri"	3:35
4.	"Sky River"	4:04
5.	"Winter"	3:51
6.	"Have You Been Here Before?"	4:56
7.	"The Lemurian"	5:48
8.	"Everytime"	5:03
9.	"Sky and Hill"	3:09
10.	"Paladin"	3:20
11.	"Martian Skyline"	5:15
12.	"I Want It"	4:33
13.	"The Place of Eternal Spring"	5:01
14.	"Rapture"	4:08
15.	"Forever"	5:29
16.	"Lumbini Theme (Slight Return)"	2:01
17.	"Sacred Echoes"	9:31
Total length:		79:38

== Personnel ==
The Church

- Steve Kilbey
- Tim Powles
- Ian Haug
- Jeffrey Cain
- Ashley Naylor
- Nicholas Meredith

== Charts ==
Chart performance for Violins
Chart (2026)	Peak position
Australian Albums (ARIA)	35
UK Independent Albums (Official Charts)	48
