= Further/Deeper =

2014 studio album by The Church

Studio album by the Church
- Released: 17 October 2014
- Recorded: 2013–2014 Rancom St Studio and Spacejunk III, NSW, Sydney, Australia; Airlock Studios, Brisbane, Queensland, Australia
- Genres: Alternative rock, neo-psychedelia, psychedelic rock, dream pop
- Length: 66:34 (US) 78:06 (Overseas)
- Label: Unorthodox
- Producers: The Church and Tim Powles

The Church chronology
Untitled #23 (2009)	Further/Deeper (2014)	Man Woman Life Death Infinity (2017)

Professional ratings
Review scores
Source	Rating
The Courier-Mail	4.5/5 stars
Sunday Herald Sun	2.5/5 stars
Sydney Morning Herald	4/5 stars

Further/Deeper is the 24th album by the Australian alternative rock band the Church, released in October 2014.

It was the first Church album in five years, during which time founding guitarist Marty Willson-Piper moved to Sweden and was replaced by former Powderfinger guitarist Ian Haug. Kilbey said Haug was asked to join the band on the album only after he had tried for six months to contact Willson-Piper. "Marty wasn't kicked out or asked to leave. He went to Sweden and when I started writing to him to say let's make an album, he didn't even write back. I tried to contact him by every known means and he didn't reply, so we say he is 'unavailable'." He said drummer Tim Powles had suggested Haug—a fan of The Church since his teenage years—as a new guitarist.

Haug joined the band in Sydney to record and in five days co-wrote more than 20 songs. "Ian's enthusiasm re-energised us," Kilbey said. "I'm not blaming Marty for this, but a certain cynicism and scepticism was shattered when Ian joined the band. Ian's all over this record; he's the prime mover behind a lot of the songs. He was always there with his guitar strapped on, suggesting 'What about this?', overdub after overdub. It's very inspiring to be part of that." He told Rolling Stone: "We knew he was a great player but we didn't know if we could work with him. As soon as he turned up, then Peter arrived 10 minutes later, the three of us cooked up 'Miami'. We wrote it quickly and without any pain or bloodshed, so I have a real fond spot for this (song). In concert we've been doing it as the last song and it's just been slaying people. It's just what the doctor ordered for The Church. A new epic."

Kilbey described Further/Deeper as "a very energetic, up-tempo record that is very complex musically". He told the Sydney Morning Herald: "We've really explored all the parameters of what The Church could be while still remaining The Church and kind of pushing the boundaries of where our music could go and what we could do with the lyrics, the vocals and instrumentation."

In late 2014 The Church played numerous Australian gigs at which they played the full album. A similar tour of the US followed in February 2015, with selected past songs added at various gigs. The band returned to the US in the summer of 2015 for a co-headline tour with the Psychedelic Furs.

The album was released in the US with 12 tracks and overseas with 15 tracks.

== Track listing ==
(all songs by Steve Kilbey, Peter Koppes, Tim Powles, Ian Haug)

1. "Vanishing Man" – 4:46
2. "Delirious" – 4:44
3. "Pride Before a Fall" – 4:19
4. "Toy Head" – 6:32
5. "Laurel Canyon" – 4:23
6. "Love Philtre" – 6:08
7. "Globe Spinning" – 5:56
8. "Old Coast Road" – 4:20
9. "Lightning White" – 6:09
10. "Let Us Go" – 4:24
11. "Volkano" – 6:07
12. "Miami" – 8:38
13. "Marine Drive (Overseas bonus track)" – 3:37
14. "The Girl Is Buoyant (Overseas bonus track)" – 3:51
15. "Xmas (Overseas bonus track)" – 5:34

== Personnel ==
- Steve Kilbey – lead vocals, bass guitar, keyboards, guitar
- Peter Koppes – guitars, organ, piano, percussion, backing vocals
- Tim Powles – drums, percussion, backing vocals
- Ian Haug – guitars, backing vocals

=== Additional musicians ===
- Caitlin West – vocals ("Love Philtre", "Toy Head", "Pride Before a Fall")
- Shelley Harland – vocals ("Vanishing Man")
- Frank Kearns – Fender six-string bass ("Love Philtre")
- William Howard – outer space piano ambience ("Globe Spinning")
