= Uninvited, Like the Clouds =

Studio album by the Church
- Released: 20 March 2006
- Recorded: 2005
- Genres: Alternative rock, neo-psychedelia, psychedelic rock, dream pop
- Length: 60:03
- Labels: Liberation, Cooking Vinyl
- Producer: The Church

The Church chronology
Back with Two Beasts (2005)	Uninvited, Like the Clouds (2006)	El Momento Siguiente (2007)

Uninvited, Like the Clouds is the 20th album by the Australian alternative rock band the Church. It was released in Australia on 20 March 2006 and internationally on 17 April.

James Christopher Monger at AllMusic gave it four stars, calling it "a bloated, beautiful, unsettling storm of a record" with "everything an adoring fan could want, and all the ammunition a detractor could carry." Bernard Zuel of The Sydney Morning Herald found it "is a summation of 26 years, drawing from all of the elements with sure rather than desperate hands" where saying that it is "the kind of collection that will warm the hearts of those for whom the 1980s and early 1990s remain the golden years of the Church, should not be read as an indication that the band has retro-fitted its career".

Professional ratings
Review scores
Source	Rating
AllMusic	4/5 stars
The Sydney Morning Herald	(positive)

== Track listing ==
All tracks are written by Steve Kilbey, Peter Koppes, Tim Powles, Marty Willson-Piper, unless otherwise indicated.

No.	Title	Length
1.	"Block"	6:20
2.	"Unified Field"	4:00
3.	"Space Needle"	4:06
4.	"Overview" (Kilbey, Koppes, Powles, Willson-Piper, David Lane)	5:33
5.	"Easy"	4:10
6.	"She'll Come Back for You Tomorrow"	4:32
7.	"Pure Chance"	6:20
8.	"Never Before"	6:13
9.	"Real Toggle Action"	4:17
10.	"Untoward"	4:55
11.	"Day 5"	5:15
12.	"Song to Go..."	4:10

Some versions of the album do not contain track 12, "Song to Go...".

== Personnel ==
- Steve Kilbey – lead vocals, bass guitar, keyboards, guitar
- Peter Koppes – guitars, keyboards, bass guitar, backing vocals, lead vocal on "Never Before"
- Tim Powles – drums, percussion, backing vocals
- Marty Willson-Piper – guitars, bass guitar, backing vocals, lead vocal on "She'll Come Back For You Tomorrow"

Additional musicians

- Jorden Brebach – guitar ("Space Needle"), backing vocals
- Sophie Glasson – cello ("Song to Go ...")
- David Lane – piano ("Overview")

Production details

- Producer – The Church
- Additional production – Tim Powles, Jorden Brebach
- Engineer – Jorden Brebach, David Trump, Ted Howard
- Additional engineering – Tim Powles, Jorden Brebach
- Assistant track engineer – Giles Muldoon
- Mixer – David Trump
- Mastering – Don Bartley
- Studios – Spacejunk 1, Rancom Street and Dodgy Sound (recording); The Vault (mixing); Studios 301 (mastering)

Artworks

- Painting – Steve Kilbey
- Design, layout – Karl Logge

== Charts ==
Chart (2006)	Peak position
Australian Albums (ARIA)	153
