= Sometime Anywhere =

Studio album by The Church
- Released: 31 May 1994
- Recorded: 1994
- Studios: Karmic Hit, Sydney, Australia (except "The Maven", Fryshuset, Stockholm, Sweden)
- Genres: Alternative rock, neo-psychedelia, psychedelic rock, dream pop
- Length: 76:50
- Labels: White (Australia); Arista (International)
- Producers: The Church and Dare Mason

The Church chronology
Priest=Aura (1992)	Sometime Anywhere (1994)	Magician Among the Spirits (1996)

Singles from Sometime Anywhere
- 1. "Two Places at Once" Released: 1994

Sometime Anywhere is the ninth album by the Australian alternative rock band the Church, released in May 1994.

After the commercially unsuccessful 1992 album Priest=Aura, founding guitarist Peter Koppes had departed, leaving the band with just two original members, Steve Kilbey and Marty Willson-Piper, plus Priest's drummer Jay Dee Daugherty. With the group's future uncertain, the members took time off to focus on other projects, while Koppes began to establish a solo career with his new group, The Well, which included former band mate Richard Ploog. Kilbey began a Jack Frost collaboration with Grant McLennan (of The Go-Betweens) and Willson-Piper returned to the studio with UK group All About Eve, to record their album Ultraviolet.

Arista Records decided to stand by their contract with the band and back another album, despite the loss of Koppes, and so Kilbey and Willson-Piper began writing new material. When it became clear that drummer Daugherty would not be returning to the fold either, the remaining two took the opportunity to approach their music from new perspectives, abandoning their long-established roles and stylistic elements in favour of experimentation, spontaneity and electronica. Song construction became freer, with each musician playing multiple tracks on various instruments, to be cut down and refined into finished pieces later. The two likened their approach to a sculptor's creative process, the pieces gradually taking shape as the work went on.

Early in 1994, they brought in Willson-Piper's childhood friend Andy 'Dare' Mason to produce, record and mix the album. It was recorded at Sydney's Karmic Hit Studios and mixed at Karmic Hit and Studios 301, except "The Maven", "Leave Your Clothes On" and "Freeze to Burn", which were recorded and mixed at Fryshuset, Stockholm, Sweden by Martin Rössel. New Zealand drummer Tim Powles was hired for the Sydney sessions, having already played with Kilbey on the Jack Frost project. Considered temporary at the time, Powles would soon become a permanent member of the band and is still with the Church over 30 years later.

Sometime Anywhere was generally well-received and peaked in the Australian Top 30. A 7-track bonus disc, entitled Somewhere Else, was included with the initial pressings. It was described as a "rich, dark, epic release which picked up where Priest=Aura left off, with lush, lengthy tracks". However, sales were lower than their previous studio albums and the first single, "Two Places at Once", did not chart. Promotion was minimal as Arista saw insufficient commercial promise in the release. With another commercially unsuccessful album on their hands, Arista did not renew The Church's contract and pulled financial support for a tour. Ambitious plans to stage full electric shows were scaled back, leaving Kilbey and Willson-Piper with only a short run of acoustic gigs as a duo.

In 2005 the album was remastered and reissued in Australia by EMI, with a second disc which included all of the Somewhere Else tracks except "Drought" (which was moved to Priest=Aura), plus the radio and video edits of "Two Places at Once".

Kilbey named his blog after the Somewhere Else track "The Time Being".

Professional ratings
Review scores
Source	Rating
AllMusic	4/5 stars
Q	3/5 stars
Rolling Stone	4/5 stars

== Track listing ==
All lead vocals by Steve Kilbey, except where indicated

1. "Day of the Dead" (Kilbey, Willson-Piper) – 6:45
2. "Lost My Touch" (Kilbey, Willson-Piper, Goudenov) – 6:31
3. "Loveblind" (Kilbey, Willson-Piper, Goudenov) – 6:24
4. "My Little Problem" (Kilbey, Willson-Piper) – 7:18
5. "The Maven" (Kilbey, Willson-Piper) – 6:48
6. "Angelica" (Willson-Piper, Kilbey, Mason) – 5:07 (sung by Steve Kilbey & Marty Willson-Piper)
7. "Lullaby" (Kilbey, Willson-Piper) – 2:59
8. "Eastern" (Instrumental - Kilbey, Willson-Piper) – 3:47
9. "Two Places at Once" (Kilbey, Willson-Piper) – 7:53 (sung by Steve Kilbey & Marty Willson-Piper)
10. "Business Woman" (Kilbey, Willson-Piper) – 4:30
11. "Authority" (Kilbey, Willson-Piper) – 5:08
12. "Fly Home" (Willson-Piper, Kilbey) – 8:43 (sung by Marty Willson-Piper)
13. "The Dead Man's Dream" (Kilbey, Willson-Piper) – 4:57

Somewhere Else (bonus disc)

1. "Drought" (Kilbey, Koppes, Ploog, Willson-Piper) – 3:18 (recorded in 1987, not on remaster)
2. "The Time Being" (Kilbey, Willson-Piper, Goudenov) – 4:34
3. "Leave Your Clothes On" (Kilbey, Willson-Piper) – 4:48
4. "Cut in Two" (Kilbey, Willson-Piper) – 4:55 (sung by Steve Kilbey, with Marty Willson-Piper interjections)
5. "The Myths You Made" (Willson-Piper, Kilbey) – 4:33 (sung by Marty Willson-Piper)
6. "Freeze to Burn" (Kilbey, Willson-Piper, Rössel) – 3:54
7. "Macabre Tavern" (Kilbey, Willson-Piper) – 3:52
8. "Two Places at Once" (Radio Edit) (Kilbey, Willson-Piper) – 4:30 (remaster only)
9. "Two Places at Once" (Video Edit) (Kilbey, Willson-Piper) – 4:50 (remaster only)

== Personnel ==
- Steve Kilbey – lead vocals, bass guitar, keyboards, guitar
- Marty Willson-Piper – guitars, vocals, bass guitar, keyboards

with

- Tim Powles – drums & percussion
- Boris Goudenov – drum loops
- Darren Ryan – drums & percussion on S.A. 4, additional loops
- Martin Rössel – drums, percussion & organ on S.A. 5; S.E. 3 & 6
- Linda Neil – violin
- Sandy Chick – female voice
- Carol Broca-Wander – French female voice
- Peter Koppes – guitar on S.E. 1
- Richard Ploog – drums on S.E. 1
