= Under the Milky Way =

1988 single by the Church

- Australian region version

Single by the Church

from the album Starfish
- B-side: "Musk"; "Warm Spell"
- Released: 15 February 1988
- Recorded: 1987
- Studio: The Complex (Los Angeles)
- Genre: New wave; neo-psychedelia; psychedelia
- Length: 4:05 (single version); 4:57 (album version)
- Label: Mushroom; Arista
- Songwriters: Steve Kilbey; Karin Jansson
- Producers: Greg Ladanyi; Waddy Wachtel; The Church

The Church singles chronology
"Disenchanted" (1986)	"Under the Milky Way" (1988)	"Reptile" (1988)

Music video
- "Under the Milky Way" on YouTube

"Under the Milky Way" is a song by Australian alternative rock band the Church, released as a single on 15 February 1988, and appears on their fifth studio album Starfish. The song was written by bass guitarist and lead vocalist Steve Kilbey and his then-girlfriend Karin Jansson of Curious (Yellow). It peaked at No. 22 on the Australian Kent Music Report Singles Chart, No. 24 on the United States Billboard Hot 100 and No. 25 on the New Zealand Singles Chart; it also appeared in the Dutch Single Top 100. At the ARIA Music Awards of 1989, the song won Single of the Year. It was issued simultaneously in both 7" vinyl and 12" vinyl formats by Arista Records (internationally) and Mushroom Records (Australian region).

In 2006, the song was remixed and released as Craig Obey vs the Church. It peaked at number 91 on the ARIA charts.

In January 2018, as part of Triple M's "Ozzest 100", the 'most Australian' songs of all time, "Under the Milky Way" was ranked number 33. In 2025, the song placed 29 in the Triple J Hottest 100 of Australian Songs.

== Background ==
In 1987, the Church travelled to Los Angeles to record their fifth studio album, Starfish, and worked with producers Waddy Wachtel and Greg Ladanyi.

The Church's line-up for the album was Steve Kilbey on bass guitar and lead vocals, Peter Koppes on guitars, Marty Willson-Piper on guitars, and Richard Ploog on drums and percussion. However, while recording "Under the Milky Way", the band were unable to get a drum track which sounded right with Ploog, so they played to a click track and later session musician Russ Kunkel was brought in to add drums and percussion.

== Composition ==
"Under the Milky Way" was written by Kilbey and Karin Jansson of Curious (Yellow). Kilbey and Jansson had become friends in 1983 and lived together in Australia from 1986. Kilbey said, "I smoked a joint and started playing the piano and she came in the room and we just made it up." According to a press release issued with Starfish, the title is from an Amsterdam music and cultural venue, Melkweg (Dutch for "Milky Way"), which Kilbey used to frequent.

I just stumbled upon it and for some reason it has struck this wonderful sense of universality with people that most of my songs don't.

— Steve Kilbey

"Under the Milky Way" features a 12-string acoustic guitar melody, along with a solo composed with an EBow on a Fender Jazzmaster and recorded on a Synclavier, leading to a sound reminiscent of bagpipes. In October 1990, Jansson told John Tingwell of Drum Media about songwriting with Kilbey, "it's a very spontaneous thing. It's not as if someone has put us together to write a hit song. It's more like sometimes when we write together, a song comes knocking on the door". While in September 2008, Kilbey discussed the track with Iain Shedden of The Australian.

Willson-Piper said, "'Milky Way' is perfect really, in the way that it crosses over from our past records. It's still this very beautiful, textured song, which is what we write, but it doesn't challenge people to find out its deepest hidden meaning the way our other songs have in the past."

== Release history ==
"Under the Milky Way" was released on 15 February 1988 in both 7" vinyl and 12" vinyl formats by Arista Records (internationally) and Mushroom Records (Australian region). The Church's fifth studio album, Starfish, was issued simultaneously with the single. In April the single was released in several formats worldwide including 7", double 7", 12", CD single, and compact cassette, using at least five different cover art designs. The 12" B-sides were "Musk" and "Warm Spell", whereas the 7" B-side was "Musk". Different Spanish versions added either "Anna Miranda" or "Perfect Child". The music video for the song featured on the Church's video compilation Goldfish (Jokes, Magic & Souvenirs).

On the Australian Kent Music Report Singles Chart "Under the Milky Way" peaked at No. 22. However, it was not the band's highest-charting single: "Almost with You" (1982) and "Metropolis" (1990) charted at No. 21 and No. 19, respectively, on the Australian charts. In the United States it reached No. 24 on the Billboard Hot 100 and No. 2 on the Mainstream Rock chart. Other charting peaks include No. 25 on the New Zealand Singles Chart, No. 69 on the Canadian RPM 100, No. 70 on the Dutch Single Top 100, and No. 90 in the United Kingdom.

An acoustic version was initially released as a single in multiple formats including 7" vinyl, CD single, and others. It also appears on the "Sum of the Parts" promotional release and the 2 CD re-issue of the Starfish album.

== Reception ==
Upon its release, Billboard called "Under the Milky Way" an "engaging, ethereal pop single". Cashbox predicted that the song would find success in the US album oriented rock radio format. Music Week thought that the song was an "excellent, evocative number displaying their fine shimmering guitars and a haunting melody line."

At the ARIA Music Awards of 1989 "Under the Milky Way" won 'Single of the Year', though Kilbey refused to attend the award ceremony. He said, "You will note that I didn't collect the award. I don't give a fuck about winning that award. I've been a big critic of the Australian music industry. I think the whole thing is utterly embarrassing and repulsive."

In 2006, Kilbey said of the recording, "It's actually flat lifeless 'n' and sterile. Great song, sure, but the performance, the sounds are ordinary. We coulda got that in Australia in a week or two for a 20th of the money we spent. Hey, it's sold almost a million in the US alone, but we'll never see any money 'cause it cost so much to make". Kilbey's assessment ignored its second life as a much-licensed track. In December 2011, he told News Limited reporter Cameron Adams:

"There is almost nothing, except for maybe a cigarette ad, I'd say no to 'Under the Milky Way' being used for [...] It was used for a car advertisement in America, very lucratively for me. You'd think people would think it's been overused, but the more it's used the more people seem to want to use it. I'm signing off all the time for TV shows or chocolate bars using it. Sure, have it, it's just a song, do whatever you like with it. You can hear it wasn't written for profit. It's an accidental song I accidentally wrote and accidentally became a single and accidentally became a hit. It's been a nice earner [...] I've written 2000 songs. Thank God one of them came through! [...] The others aren't pulling their weight. They sit and grumble about 'Under the Milky Way' and I say, 'Well, boys, go out and earn the same dough as that one'. I never see 'Under the Milky Way' – it's so busy out there working..."

In 2001, the song was featured on the soundtrack for the film Donnie Darko. In 2006, it was performed with the Melbourne Symphony Orchestra at the opening ceremony of the 2006 Commonwealth Games in Melbourne. Kilbey said after the performance that it was as if the song had been made for the occasion, though in his blog he was critical of the Commonwealth Games as an event. In September 2008, readers of The Weekend Australian Magazine voted it as the best Australian song of the last 20 years. Sheet music for "Under the Milky Way" was published by Hal Leonard.

In October 2010, the Church's Starfish was listed in the top 40 in the book, 100 Best Australian Albums. The authors, John O'Donnell, Toby Creswell and Craig Mathieson, described "Under the Milky Way" as "[The Church's] signature track ... [which] caught them at their peak of guitar-fuelled creativity ... [it is] the elegiac centrepiece of the record ... sounded like an induction, with its soft, monkish keyboard washes and ringing guitar chords, but it never reaches the point of transition where one world gives way to the next ... possibly concerned with drugs, but it transcends any single setting or worldview".

== Track listings ==
12" Australian region version
No.	Title	Writer(s)	Length
1.	"Under the Milky Way"	Steve Kilbey, Karin Jansson	4:57
2.	"Warm Spell"	Kilbey, Marty Willson-Piper, Peter Koppes	4:35
3.	"Musk"	Willson-Piper, Richard Ploog, Kilbey, Koppes	3:55

7" international version
No.	Title	Writer(s)	Length
1.	"Under the Milky Way"	Steve Kilbey, Karin Jansson	4:05
2.	"Musk"	Willson-Piper, Richard Ploog, Kilbey, Koppes	3:55

2× 7" Spain release
No.	Title	Writer(s)	Length
1.	"Under the Milky Way"	Steve Kilbey, Karin Jansson	4:57
2.	"Anna Miranda"	Marty Willson-Piper, Richard Ploog, Kilbey, Peter Koppes, Jansson	2:57
3.	"Antenna"	Koppes, Kilbey, Willson-Piper, Ploog	3:51
4.	"Destination"	Willson-Piper, Ploog, Kilbey, Koppes	5:51

12" Spain release
No.	Title	Writer(s)	Length
1.	"Under the Milky Way"	Steve Kilbey, Karin Jansson	4:57
2.	"Perfect Child"	Kilbey, Richard Ploog, Marty Willson-Piper, Peter Koppes	2:53
3.	"Musk"	Willson-Piper, Ploog, Kilbey, Koppes	3:55
4.	"Warm Spell"	Kilbey, Willson-Piper, Koppes	4:35

== Charts ==
Chart (1988)	Peak position
Australia (Kent Music Report)	22
Canada Top Singles (RPM)	69
Netherlands (Single Top 100)	70
New Zealand (Recorded Music NZ)	25
UK Singles (Official Charts)	90
US Billboard Hot 100	24
US Album Rock Tracks (Billboard)	2

Chart (2006)	Peak position
Australia (ARIA) Craig Obey vs. the Church	91

== Certifications ==
Certifications and sales for "Under the Milky Way"
Region	Certification	Certified units/sales
New Zealand (RMNZ)	Platinum	30,000^{‡}
^{‡} Sales+streaming figures based on certification alone.

== Sia version ==
"Under the Milky Way"

Single by Sia
- Released: 26 January 2010
- Recorded: 2009
- Length: 3:34
- Label: Rhino (Warner Music Group)
- Songwriters: Steve Kilbey; Karin Jansson

Sia singles chronology
"You've Changed" (2009)	"Under the Milky Way" (2010)	"Clap Your Hands" (2010)

Sia recorded "Under the Milky Way" as a non-album single. It was released on 26 January 2010.

== Other versions ==
In 2016, Metric released a cover of "Under the Milky Way" for the AmfAR AIDS charity's benefit album The Time Is Now!.

Strawpeople recorded a cover for the album Broadcast (1994). It was released as a single and peaked at number 113 on the Australian singles chart in November 1995.
