= Starfish (album) =

Studio album by The Church
- Released: 16 February 1988
- Recorded: 1987
- Studio: The Complex (Los Angeles)
- Genre: Alternative rock; psychedelic rock; dream pop
- Length: 46:07
- Label: Mushroom/Arista
- Producer: Greg Ladanyi; Waddy Wachtel; The Church

The Church chronology
Heyday (1985)	Starfish (1988)	Gold Afternoon Fix (1990)

Singles from Starfish
- 1. "Under the Milky Way" Released: February 1988; 2. "Reptile" Released: April 1988; 3. "Destination" Released: July 1988; 4. "Antenna" Released: October 1988

Starfish is the fifth album by the Australian rock band The Church, released in February 1988 by Mushroom Records in Australia and by Arista Records internationally. The band's international breakthrough album, Starfish went gold in America and has remained their most commercially successful release. The album sold 600,000 copies in the United States alone. The first single, "Under the Milky Way", charted on the US Billboard Hot 100, peaking at No. 24, and at No. 2 on the Mainstream Rock Tracks chart, leading to significant exposure of the then relatively underground Australian act. In Australia "Under the Milky Way" climbed to No. 22, and Starfish reached No. 11 on the albums chart.

== Background ==
The album was recorded and produced in Los Angeles by L.A. session musicians Waddy Wachtel and Greg Ladanyi. The recording is more sparse and open than its predecessor, Heyday, which featured orchestral arrangements with brass and strings. Many of its songs have seen heavy rotation in live set lists, and the album remains a favourite among many fans.

The song "Under the Milky Way" was co-written by lead vocalist/bassist Steve Kilbey with his then-girlfriend Karin Jansson of Pink Champagne. When drummer Richard Ploog was unable to find the right feel for the song, the band played to a click track and session musician Russ Kunkel was brought in to add the drums and percussion later.

The album's title was taken from Kilbey's nickname for friend and musical partner Donnette Thayer, who signed herself that way on postcards she sent to Kilbey. Kilbey contributed a long untitled poem to the album's liner notes. Music videos were filmed for "Under the Milky Way" and "Reptile".

=== 1988 tour ===
Touring for Starfish in 1988 marked the first time that the bulk of the shows were in North America. European dates were limited to two weeks in March and April, and another week at the end of June, while the only Australian shows were in Melbourne and Sydney at the end of April. The North American leg of the tour was extensive, however, covering virtually all of May and June, another month of dates from mid-August to mid-September and still more shows in October. On the August and September dates, The Church were paired with Peter Murphy, former lead singer of the cult post-punk/Goth band Bauhaus, now pursuing a mildly successful solo career. Murphy apparently expressed displeasure at being relegated to the status of opening act, but there was nothing he could do about it – "Under the Milky Way" was climbing the Billboard singles chart, while Murphy would not achieve a similar breakthrough for another two years. For a number of other dates on the tour, the band was paired with another of their heroes: Tom Verlaine of Television. Verlaine supported The Church. For their encore every night ("You Took"), they brought Verlaine on stage with them for a three-way guitar duel. Some fans consider the Verlaine/Church shows to be some of the best live performances they've ever witnessed. Drummer Richard Ploog became gradually disengaged from the band during this tour, even though he stayed with The Church for another two years. The exact nature of his malady is unknown but most agree that LSD exacerbated his condition. There were degrees of internal strife within the band and a high pressure of expectation from Arista. Because of this, Kilbey smoked more pot on this tour than at any other point in his life – such large quantities that he routinely coughed up blood. By the tour's end, The Church had performed 94 shows across the United States, Canada, Europe, the United Kingdom and Australia.

== Legacy ==
The fifth season of the US TV show Miami Vice featured two songs from the album: "Under the Milky Way" was used in an episode called "Asian Cut" (aired 13 January 1989), and "Blood Money" was showcased throughout "Heart of Night" (18 November 1988).

"Under the Milky Way" was also featured in the 2001 film Donnie Darko.

The song "Reptile" was used in Toy Machine's skateboarding video Suffer the Joy. A sheet music/guitar tablature book was released for the entire album by Cherry Lane.

In October 2010, it was listed in the top 40 in the book, 100 Best Australian Albums.

In 2011 the album, along with Priest=Aura and Untitled #23, was played in its entirety on the band's 30th anniversary "Future, Past, Perfect" tour.

== Critical reception ==
Professional ratings
Review scores
Source	Rating
AllMusic	4.5/5 stars
Kerrang!	4 1/2/5
Los Angeles Times	3/4 stars
Rolling Stone	4/5 stars
The Rolling Stone Album Guide	3.5/5 stars
Sounds	4/5 stars
The Village Voice	B

In a retrospective review for AllMusic, critic Ned Raggett wrote that "if sometimes too clean around the corners in comparison to the song-for-song masterpiece Heyday, Starfish set up the band's well-deserved breakthrough in the States," and added that the performances throughout "are at the least fine and at the most fantastic."

== Track listing ==
All Tracks: Lyrics – Steve Kilbey, Music – Steve Kilbey, Peter Koppes, Richard Ploog and Marty Willson-Piper, except where noted

No.	Title	Writer(s)	Length
1.	"Destination"		5:51
2.	"Under the Milky Way"	Kilbey, Karin Jansson	4:57
3.	"Blood Money"		4:23
4.	"Lost"		4:47
5.	"North, South, East and West"		4:59
6.	"Spark"	Willson-Piper	3:45
7.	"Antenna"		3:51
8.	"Reptile"		4:56
9.	"A New Season"	Koppes	2:58
10.	"Hotel Womb"	Kilbey	5:40
Total length:			46:07

=== Bonus 12" EP ===
Initial vinyl copies of the album came with a free bonus 12" EP which contained:

No.	Title	Writer(s)	Length
1.	"Anna Miranda"	Kilbey, Jansson, Koppes, Ploog, Willson-Piper	3:04
2.	"Musk"		3:54
3.	"Perfect Child"		2:55
4.	"Frozen and Distant"		3:58
5.	"Texas Moon"		5:46

=== 2005 EMI Australia 2CD remaster ===
This edition included a second disc which contained:

No.	Title	Writer(s)	Length
1.	"Texas Moon"		5:46
2.	"Perfect Child"		2:55
3.	"We Both Know Why You're Here"		2:21
4.	"Frozen and Distant"		3:58
5.	"Anna Miranda"	Kilbey, Jansson, Koppes, Ploog, Willson-Piper	3:04
6.	"Nose Dive"	Kilbey, Jansson, Koppes, Ploog, Willson-Piper	3:26
7.	"Afterlife"		4:14
8.	"Under the Milky Way" (acoustic)	Kilbey, Jansson	4:08
9.	"Antenna" (acoustic)		3:46
10.	"Spark" (acoustic)	Willson-Piper	3:28
11.	"Warm Spell"	Kilbey, Koppes, Willson-Piper	4:38
12.	"Musk"		3:54

- This 2CD version was re-released in 2010 in the U.S. by Second Motion Records as part of their 30th Anniversary Series.
- All of these tracks, except "Warm Spell", "Musk" and the three acoustic versions, had appeared on the 1991 rarities compilation A Quick Smoke at Spot's: Archives 1986–1990.

== Personnel ==
=== The Church ===
- Marty Willson-Piper – Guitars, Lead Vocal on "Spark"
- Richard Ploog – Drums, Percussion
- Peter Koppes – Guitars, Lead Vocal on "A New Season"
- Steve Kilbey – Bass Guitar, Lead Vocals

=== Additional Personnel ===
- Greg Kuehn – Keyboards
- Russ Kunkel – Drums and Percussion (2)
- David Lindley – Mandolin (7)
- Awesome Welles – Synclavier
- Waddy Wachtel – Backing Vocals

== Production ==
- Produced by Greg Ladanyi, Waddy Wachtel and The Church
- Engineered by Shep Lonsdale; assisted by Duane Seykora
- Mixed by Greg Ladanyi, Waddy Wachtel and Shep Lonsdale

== Charts ==
Chart (1988)	Peak position
Australian Albums (Australian Music Report)	11
US Billboard 200	41

== Certifications ==
RIAA:Gold
