= Electric Lash =

Single by the Church

from the album Seance
- B-side: "Autumn Soon"
- Released: 8 August 1983
- Studio: Studio 301
- Genre: Jangle pop, neo-psychedelia
- Length: 4:25
- Label: Parlophone
- Songwriter: Steve Kilbey
- Producers: The Church, Nick Launay

The Church singles chronology
"Almost with You" (1982)	"Electric Lash" (1983)	"It's No Reason" (1983)

"Electric Lash" is a song by Australian alternative rock band The Church. It was released as a single from the album Seance. It was a hit single in 1983. In Steve Kilbey's 2014 memoir "Something Quite Peculiar" Kilbey wrote that then 3XY journalist Jennifer Keyte was "the voice of the girl on the radio" in the song's lyrics. Keyte wrote that "it was one of those lovely early romances you have such fond memories of."

Guitarist Marty Willson-Piper said the song would have been "a big hit" with accessible lyrics, "but it just sounded meaningless and surreal. We were in this studio where they had man-made carpet on the floor which used to build up static electricity, and you'd get a little shock off everything, even the potted plants, so it became 'electric lashes from trees in the studio'."
