= Hologram of Baal =

- Australian cover

Studio album by The Church
- Released: 8 September 1998
- Recorded: 1998
- Genre: Alternative rock, neo-psychedelia, psychedelic rock, dream pop, post-rock, space rock
- Length: 50:40 / 79:18 (bonus disc)
- Label: Festival, Cooking Vinyl, Thirsty Ear
- Producer: The Church

The Church chronology
Pharmakoi/Distance-Crunching Honchos with Echo Units (1997)	Hologram of Baal (1998)	A Box of Birds (1999)

Variant Cover
- American cover

Hologram of Baal is the eleventh album by the Australian alternative rock band The Church, released in September 1998.

Founding guitarist Peter Koppes rejoined the band for this album after a six year gap. It was also the first album which the band had produced on their own and was recorded and mixed by their drummer Tim Powles. Album titles originally proposed by singer Steve Kilbey included Bastard Universe and Hologram of Allah, but these were rejected as too inflammatory. In the end, the latter was amended with the name of a deity from the Canaanite pantheon and the former was used as the title of the bonus disc. The song "This Is It" is about the death of INXS front man and fellow Australian, Michael Hutchence.

The bonus disc, Bastard Universe, included with the first pressings, contained a seemingly continuous 79 minute instrumental improvisation, divided into six "stages". The U.S. and U.K. pressings list only four "stages", although all six tracks are present on the CDs.

The original Australian cover design, featuring a green, full-frame, pseudo-holographic image of a primitive mask, was heavily modified for the U.S. and U.K. releases. These feature a plain reddish-brown image of the mask, originally used inside the Australian booklet, placed to the right (U.S.) or left (U.K.) of a vertical black bar containing the band's name in large dark blue type.

During the subsequent U.S. tour in 1999, Kilbey was arrested in New York City for attempting to purchase heroin. He was ultimately sentenced to community service by sweeping subway cars. With Kilbey absent for a scheduled gig at New York's Bowery Ballroom, guitarist Marty Willson-Piper served as lead vocalist. There is a bootleg recording of the show known as Steveless in New York City.

== Track listing ==
All songs written by Kilbey/Koppes/Powles/Willson-Piper

1. "Anaesthesia" - 5:18
2. "Ricochet" - 3:34
3. "Louisiana" - 6:04
4. "The Great Machine" - 5:48
5. "No Certainty Attached" - 4:00
6. "Tranquility" - 7:38
7. "Buffalo" - 4:14
8. "This Is It" - 4:23
9. "Another Earth" - 3:32
10. "Glow-Worm" - 6:07

Bastard Universe (bonus disc)

1. "Stage 1" - 15:52
2. "Stage 2" - 11:31
3. "Stage 3" - 13:04
4. "Stage 4" - 12:23
5. "Stage 5" - 10:49
6. "Stage 6" - 15:40

Professional ratings
Review scores
Source	Rating
Allmusic	4/5 stars

== Personnel ==
- Steve Kilbey – lead vocals, bass guitar, keyboards, guitar
- Peter Koppes – guitars, keyboards, bass guitar, backing vocals
- Tim Powles – drums, percussion, bass guitar, backing vocals
- Marty Willson-Piper – guitars, bass guitar, backing vocals

with

- William Bowden – radiotronics on tracks 1, 2, 3, 4, 8 & 9
- Linda Neil – violin on tracks 3 and 10
