= Heyday (The Church album) =

Studio album by The Church
- Released: November 1985 (Australia); January 28, 1986 (US)
- Recorded: Winter/Spring 1985
- Studio: Studios 301 (Sydney, Australia)
- Genre: Alternative rock, neo-psychedelia, psychedelic rock, dream pop
- Length: 42:58
- Label: EMI Parlophone (Australia/UK); Warner Bros. (US/Canada); Arista (US/Canada reissue)
- Producer: Peter Walsh

The Church chronology
Persia (1984)	Heyday (1985)	Starfish (1988)

Singles from Heyday
- 1. "Already Yesterday" Released: 1985; 2. "Tantalized" Released: 1986; 3. "Columbus" Released: 1986; 4. "Disenchanted" Released: 1986 (UK-only release)

Professional ratings
Review scores
Source	Rating
Allmusic	4.5/5 stars
Kerrang!	2/5 stars
The Rolling Stone Album Guide	3/5 stars

Heyday is the fourth album by the Australian alternative rock band The Church, released in November 1985. This was their first chart entry in the United States, cresting at #148. The album marked the first occasion when group compositions dominated one of the band's releases. Steve Kilbey has said: "The demo situation was getting to us - me writing the songs on my eight-track and bringing them along to the band. It sounded too stiff. We'd reached this new energy level on stage which by far superseded anything we'd ever recorded, so we knew the only way to get sounding like that (on record) was for the whole band to write together."

Robert Dean Lurie notes that "As the band began cutting the album at Studios 301, it became apparent that there had been a dramatic change in Steve's voice. Perhaps it was the extended break from performing, or abstaining from drugs, or the hours of yoga; in any case, Steve's singing was now much more relaxed and warm, and he possessed a wider, more dynamic range. For years, critics had pointed to Steve's sometimes dour voice as the Church's weak point. Suddenly, during these new recording sessions, his distinctive vocals became one of the band's greatest strengths – its signature, in fact. In addition to singing all the leads, Steve also tracked multiple harmony parts for each song, sometimes singing an entire octave higher than his normal register."

Although most of the keyboards utilised on previous recordings had been stripped back, the album saw a greater amount of embellishment with the addition of strings and brass. While at the time Heyday featured more focus on the guitar interplay than anything since The Blurred Crusade, solos had been cut to a bare minimum. Rolling Stone said the album "suggest[s] a more electrified version of Love's '68 [sic] orchestral rock classic Forever Changes."

Despite some critics and followers taking issue with the brash horns on some songs, the album regularly lists among the fan base's (and even band members') favourites. Tracks such as "Myrrh" and "Tantalized" have been featured in live shows even up to present day. It is notable for being, to date, the last album by the group to feature a printed lyric sheet - Kilbey has declined to include lyrics with any subsequent albums.

Despite the increased amount of studio collaboration on Heyday between the members, while the band was on tour in April 1986 to support the album, Willson-Piper suddenly quit mid-tour after rising in-band tensions. On 10 July, The Church performed as a three-piece in Hamburg, Germany; Willson-Piper returned within a week after Kilbey agreed that future releases would contain more group efforts.

In 2002 the album was remastered and reissued by EMI Australia, with a bonus disc including promo videos for "Already Yesterday", "Tantalized" and "Columbus".

In 2010, Second Motion Records released a single-disc remaster as part of their 30th Anniversary Series.

The music video for "Already Yesterday" was filmed in Avalon, Sydney and Hyde Park, Sydney. (https://martywillson-piper.com/heyday/)

== Track listing ==
All songs written by Kilbey/Koppes/Ploog/Willson-Piper, except where indicated

1. "Myrrh" - 4:19
2. "Tristesse" - 3:29
3. "Already Yesterday" - 4:14
4. "Columbus" - 3:50
5. "Happy Hunting Ground" - 5:31
6. "As You Will" (Koppes) - 4:44
7. "Tantalized" - 4:59
8. "Disenchanted" (Kilbey) - 3:55
9. "Night of Light" - 4:47
10. "Youth Worshipper" (Kilbey/Karin Jansson) - 3:43
11. "Roman" - 3:51
12. "The View" (Willson-Piper) - 3:44
13. "Trance Ending" - 4:48

"As You Will", "The View" and "Trance Ending" appear on the CD and cassette versions only.

== Personnel ==
Credited to:

- Steve Kilbey - bass, lead vocals (1–5, 7–11, 13)
- Peter Koppes - guitars, backing and lead (6) vocals
- Marty Willson-Piper - guitars, backing and lead (12) vocals
- Richard Ploog - drums, backing vocals, percussion

Produced and engineered by Peter Walsh
Additional Engineering by Guy 'De Vox' Gray
Strings and Horns arranged by Steve Kilbey ("Night Of Light", "Youth Worshipper") and Peter Walsh ("Night Of Light", "Happy Hunting Ground")
Orchestrated by Tony Ansell
1st Violin: Philip Hartl
Keyboards: Rick Chadwick (courtesy CBS Records)
Choir ("Already Yesterday"): Mark Williams, Mark Punch (courtesy CBS Records), Shauna Jensen, Maggie McKinney
Sound Effects: Leon
Cover photography: Caught 'n Framed (Wendy McDougall)
