= A Box of Birds =

Studio album by The Church
- Released: 21 September 1999
- Recorded: 1999
- Genre: Alternative rock, neo-psychedelia, psychedelic rock, dream pop
- Label: Festival, Cooking Vinyl, Thirsty Ear
- Producer: Dave Trump, Tim Powles

The Church chronology
| Hologram of Baal (1998) | A Box of Birds (1999) | After Everything Now This (2002) |

A Box of Birds is the twelfth album by the Australian psychedelic rock band The Church, released in September 1999. It consists of cover versions of tracks by artists who were influential on the group's music.

The album was released after the band's decision to abandon an already-complete live album and was recorded and mixed in 10 days. Guitarist Marty Willson-Piper said the band had played several covers in its gigs over the years, including "The Porpoise Song", "It's All Too Much" and "Cortez the Killer" – "and we thought, why not put them on a record. So we came along with our own ideas. Tim wanted to do an Iggy Pop number, Peter wanted "Cortez", Steve wanted Kevin Ayers and I wanted to do Alex Harvey. We had to pick 10 after an initial list of about 40."

Professional ratings
Review scores
| Source | Rating |
|---|---|
| AllMusic | 3/5 stars |

== Track listing ==
| No. | Title | Writer(s) | Original Artist | Length |
|---|---|---|---|---|
| 1. | "The Faith Healer" | Alex Harvey, Hugh McKenna | The Sensational Alex Harvey Band | 7:35 |
| 2. | "It's All Too Much" | George Harrison | The Beatles | 6:10 |
| 3. | "Hiroshima Mon Amour" | John Foxx, Billy Currie, Warren Cann | Ultravox! | 4:27 |
| 4. | "The Porpoise Song" | Gerry Goffin, Carole King | The Monkees | 4:28 |
| 5. | "Decadence" | Kevin Ayers | Kevin Ayers | 9:14 |
| 6. | "The Endless Sea" | Jim Osterberg Jr. | Iggy Pop | 4:33 |
| 7. | "Friction" | Tom Verlaine | Television | 5:11 |
| 8. | "All the Young Dudes" | David Bowie | Mott the Hoople | 4:10 |
| 9. | "Silver Machine" | Dave Brock, Robert Calvert | Hawkwind | 4:57 |
| 10. | "Cortez the Killer" | Neil Young | Neil Young with Crazy Horse | 11:08 |

== Personnel ==
- Steve Kilbey – lead vocals, bass guitar, keyboards, guitar
- Peter Koppes – guitars, keyboards, bass guitar, backing vocals
- Tim Powles – drums, percussion, backing vocals
- Marty Willson-Piper – guitars, bass guitar, backing vocals
