= Second Motion Records =

Second Motion Records is an American independent record label, part of Second Motion Entertainment based in Carrboro, North Carolina. The label was founded by Stephen Judge in Chapel Hill, North Carolina.

In 2010 Second Motion Entertainment (the label's parent company) purchased the assets of Blurt Magazine and is the publisher of the magazine and on-line media outlet. Blurt has often been called the "Mojo Magazine of the United States". In Feb 2012 Second Motion announced that both Blurt magazine and the label would be relocating their offices to Raleigh, North Carolina, and that they had more "big news" forthcoming in April 2012.

== History ==
The label was founded in Chapel Hill, North Carolina by Stephen Judge, who is the former manager of the rock band Athenaeum (who released two albums on Atlantic Records in the mid- to late 1990s), as well as the former general manager and A&R director of Redeye Distribution and Yep Roc Records. Judge has also worked with such artists as: Liam Finn, Bell X1, John Doe, Paul Weller, Public Enemy, Daniel Lanois, Martin Sexton, Sloan, Concrete Blonde, The Supersuckers and others.

Second Motion started releasing albums in the fall of 2008. Their first release was Irish singer (and Mercury Award nominee) Gemma Hayes. The "Hollow of Morning" which reached #12 first week in the Irish Charts. At same time the label also released three records from Verve Pipe singer, Brian Vander Ark. His debut "Resurrection" (originally released on Brash Records, and also the previously unreleased "Angel, Put Your Face On" as well as the new 2008 album simply entitled "Brian Vander Ark".

In 2009 Second Motion moved their operations from Chapel Hill, North Carolina, to East Lansing, Michigan, for two years before moving back to Chapel Hill at the end of 2010. The label reissued the first two albums from Swervedriver "Raise" and "Mezcal Head" to high critical acclaim. The two Swervedriver releases have been digitally remastered with 4 extra bonus tracks on each and a special digipak artwork and liner notes form band members and are widely considered two of the top alternative albums of the 1990s. Then the label also released a new studio album from Australian band, The Church which concluded with a North American tour from June to July 2009 with support from label mate and Swervedriver front-man Adam Franklin and his band Bolts of Melody.

In addition to Swervedriver and The Church the label also released albums by Church frontman Steve Kilbey, Church guitarist Marty Willson-Piper. Swervedriver frontman Adam Franklin, Oslo, Norway's The DiSCiPLiNES which features Posies frontman Ken Stringfellow on lead vocals and the 8th studio album from power-pop songwriter Tommy Keene.

2010 saw releases from Steve Kilbey & Martin Kennedy (from the Church and All-India Radio respectively), a reissue campaign of Church frontman Steve Kilbey including a limited edition box set and 30th Anniversary catalog reissues from The Church. A new album from Dutch favorites Bettie Serveert, new studio album from Adam Franklin & Bolts of Melody, Canadian singer-songwriter Emm Gryner and a retrospective from Raleigh, NC band Finger and Tommy Keene who recently toured playing his classic album "Places That Are Gone" a huge college radio hit in the 80's. At the end of 2010 Second Motion started to celebrate The Church's 30th Anniversary by reissues/remasters of the band's major label catalog.. with reissues (and bonus tracks) of the albums "Of Skins & Heart", "The Blurred Crusade", "Seance" and "Heyday" the label also released the first 30th Anniversary Singles collection, a 2×CD collection of singles from the band's entire career 1980–2010, with extensive booklet of photos and liner notes from Rolling Stone magazine editor, David Fricke.

In 2011 Second Motion released the classic albums from The Church "Starfish" and "Priest=Aura" and in Feb did an 11 city tour of the United States where the band played both of those albums, as well as their latest release "Untitled #23" in its entirety. The tour was called "Future, Past Perfect". Upon the band's 30th Anniversary they were inducted into the ARIA Australian Rock & Roll Hall of Fame. Then in April the band capped off the successful campaign with a sold-out show at the Sydney Opera House with a 70 piece orchestra backing them up. The entire show was recorded and a DVD release is planned for sometime in 2012.

At the end of 2011, Second Motion released another studio album from Tommy Keene which made many critics choices as a top 30-50 album of the year, and they also released an album from the Finnish rock band The Latebirds which features guest appearances from artists such as Levon Helm, Kris Kristofferson, Neils Cline of Wilco and others.

In 2012 the label was quiet at the first half of the year as they were working on another entity to join the fold in April 2012, the label does have plans to do more releases in the fall of 2012, including a potential new studio album from Dutch rockers Bettie Serveert. The Church are also working on a new solo record that is anticipated to be released sometime in 2013.

In addition to the record label, Second Motion has also acted as an Artist Management company and Label Administration arm. Working with artists such as producer Daniel Lanois, Arena Rock Records, former Greensboro, NC rock outfit Athenaeum and their singer Mark Kano and managed the careers of Canadian pop singer Emm Gryner, Dublin, Ireland's The Walls, Swervedriver's Adam Franklin and UK punk band New Model Army. By the end of 2011 Management duties were pretty non-existent as the company focused more on the other two entities it owns, Blurt Magazine and a new unannounced acquisition that is slated for April 2012.

== Artists ==
- Bettie Serveert
- Gemma Hayes
- Brian Vander Ark
- Steve Kilbey (of The Church)
- Marty Willson-Piper (of The Church)
- Steve Kilbey & Martin Kennedy (of the Church and All India Radio respectively)
- Finger
- The Odds
- Swervedriver
- Adam Franklin
- Emm Gryner
- The Disciplines (features Ken Stringfellow on vocals)
- The Church
- Tommy Keene

associated with:

- Arena Rock Records
- Yep Roc Records
- Hi-Speed Soul Records
- Daniel Lanois
- The Walls (Ireland)
- Athenaeum
- Redeye Distribution
- Blurt Magazine
- Emm Gryner
- The Walls
- New Model Army
