= Almost with You =

1982 single by the Church

Single by The Church

from the album The Blurred Crusade
- B-side: "Life Speeds Up"
- Released: 20 April 1982
- Length: 4:11
- Label: Parlophone
- Songwriter: Steve Kilbey
- Producer: Bob Clearmountain

The Church singles chronology
"Tear It All Away" (1981)	"Almost with You" (1982)	"When You Were Mine" (1982)

"Almost with You" is a song by Australian band the Church, released as a single from their 1982 album The Blurred Crusade.
