= The Church (band) =

Australian rock band

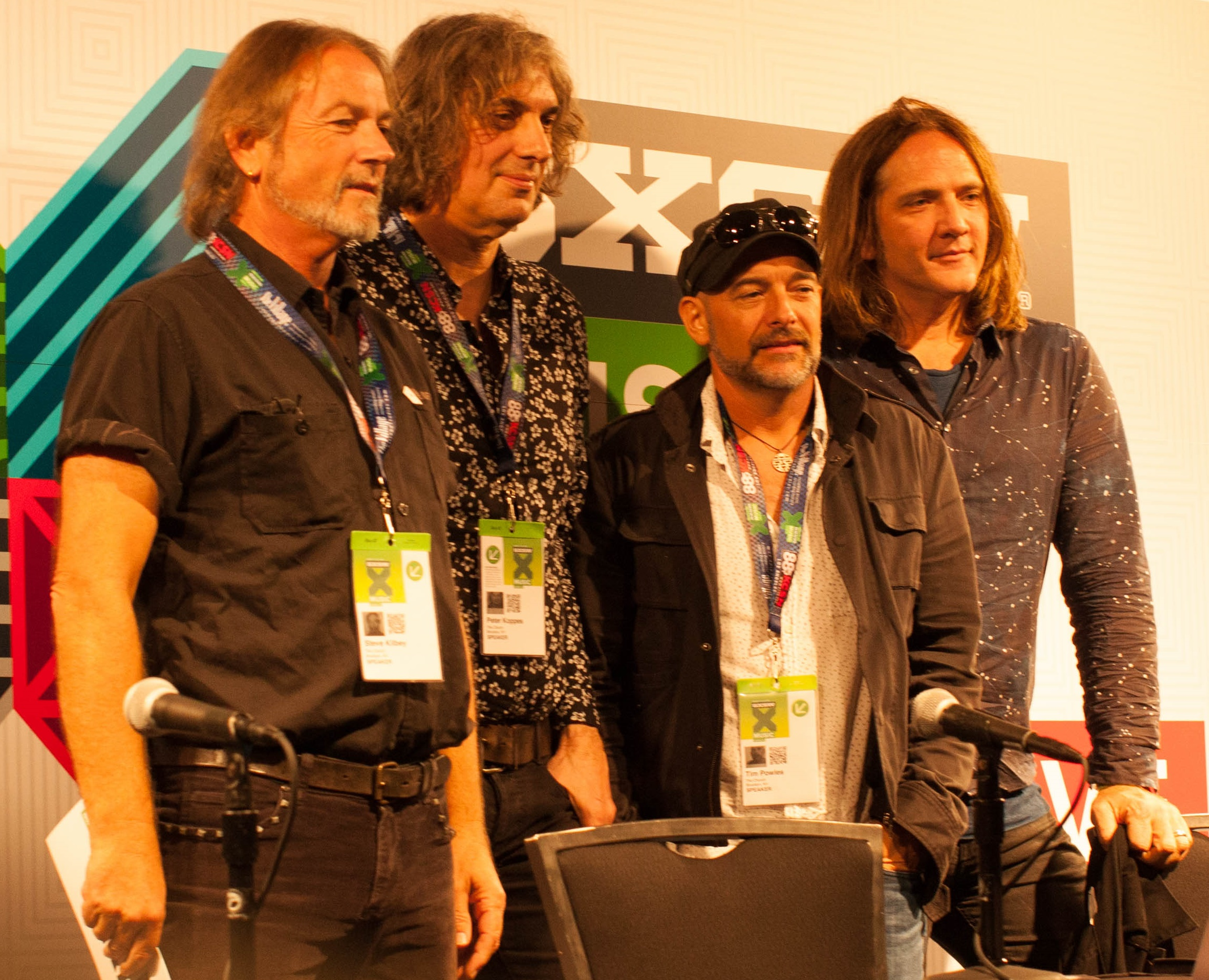
- The Church in 2015

Background information
- Origin: Sydney, Australia
- Genres: Alternative rock; new wave; neo-psychedelia; post-punk; dream pop
- Years active: 1980–present
- Labels: EMI; Capitol; Carrere; Warner Bros.; Mushroom; Arista; Festival; Cooking Vinyl; Thirsty Ear; Liberation; Unorthodox; Second Motion
- Spinoffs: The Refo:mation
- Members: Steve Kilbey; Tim Powles; Ian Haug; Jeffrey Cain; Ashley Naylor
- Past members: Peter Koppes; Marty Willson-Piper; Richard Ploog; Jay Dee Daugherty; Nick Ward
- Website: thechurchband.net

The Church are an Australian rock band formed in Sydney in 1980. Initially associated with new wave, neo-psychedelia, and indie rock, their music later came to feature slower tempos and surreal soundscapes reminiscent of alternative rock, dream pop, and post-rock. Glenn A. Baker has written that "From the release of the 'She Never Said' single in November 1980, this unique Sydney-originated entity has purveyed a distinctive, ethereal, psychedelic-tinged sound which has alternatively found favour and disfavour in Australia." The Los Angeles Times has described the band's music as "dense, shimmering, exquisite guitar pop".

The founding members were Steve Kilbey on lead vocals and bass guitar, Peter Koppes and Marty Willson-Piper on guitars, and Nick Ward on drums. Ward played only on their debut album, and the band's drummer for the rest of the 1980s was Richard Ploog. Jay Dee Daugherty (ex-Patti Smith Group) played drums from 1990 to 1993, followed by "timEbandit" Tim Powles (ex-the Venetians), who remains with them to the present day. Koppes left the band from 1992 to 1997 and again in 2020, with Willson-Piper departing in 2013. Ian Haug, formerly of Powderfinger, replaced Willson-Piper, with former touring multi-instrumentalist Jeffrey Cain and Even guitarist Ashley Naylor joining after Koppes' later departure. Kilbey, Koppes, and Powles also recorded together as the Refo:mation in 1997.

The Church's debut album, Of Skins and Heart (1981), delivered their first radio hit, "The Unguarded Moment", and they were signed to major labels in Australia, Europe, and the United States. However, the U.S. label, dissatisfied with their second album, dropped the band without releasing it. This put a dent in their success in the U.S., but they returned to the charts in 1988 with the album Starfish and the U.S. Top 40 hit "Under the Milky Way". Subsequent mainstream success has proved elusive, but the band has sustained a large international cult following and earned consistent critical recognition for its later work, including being inducted into the ARIA Hall of Fame in Sydney in 2010.

The Church continue to tour and record, releasing their twenty‑sixth studio album, The Hypnogogue, in 2023, and their twenty‑seventh, Eros Zeta and the Perfumed Guitars, in 2024.

== History ==
=== 1980–1981: Early days, Of Skins and Heart ===
Singer, songwriter, and bass guitarist Steve Kilbey first played with guitarist Peter Koppes in a band called Baby Grande in Canberra, Australia in the mid-1970s. After each had left to travel and play in other bands, including Tactics (Kilbey) and Limazine (Koppes), they met again in Sydney in March 1980 and formed the initial three-piece version of The Church, with Limazine drummer Nick Ward. The name was a shortened version of the original name proposed by Kilbey: "The Church of Man". A month later, Marty Willson-Piper, originally from Liverpool, United Kingdom, witnessed one of their gigs and met Kilbey afterwards. That same night he was invited to join the band on guitar, establishing the classic two-guitar formation.

A four-song demo was recorded in Kilbey's bedroom studio and sent to Chris Gilbey of ATV Northern Songs. The song "Chrome Injury" attracted the attention of managing director Gilbey, who signed the band to his recently formed record production company, in association with EMI and their recently resurrected Parlophone label.

The band's debut album, Of Skins and Heart, was recorded late in 1980, produced by Gilbey, and mixed by Bob Clearmountain. The first single, "She Never Said", was released in November, but did not chart. At the start of 1981, Ward was replaced on drums by Richard Ploog. Ploog was recruited by their manager, Michael Chugg, after hearing of his reputation in Adelaide. Ploog's arrival established The Church's first stable line-up. The second single, "The Unguarded Moment", co-written by Kilbey and Michelle Parker, was issued alongside the album in March 1981. "The Unguarded Moment" became an Australian top forty hit, reaching No. 22 on the Australian Kent Music Report Singles Chart, while Of Skins and Heart went gold, achieving the same position on the related Albums Chart. To promote the releases, the band undertook their first national tour.

The first recordings with Ploog were released as a five-track double 7-inch EP, Too Fast for You, in July. Their image and sound now evoked comparisons with 1960s psychedelic groups, with tight jeans, paisley shirts, and Byrds-style jangly guitars.

After the commercial success of Of Skins and Heart, it was re-released in 1982 as The Church, with a modified track listing. The Church peaked at no. 7 in the New Zealand Albums Chart and no. 13 in Sweden. Capitol Records also released an edited single version of "The Unguarded Moment", without the band's approval.

=== 1982–1985: The Blurred Crusade, Seance, Remote Luxury, and Persia ===
The band's second album, The Blurred Crusade, was issued in March 1982 and was both produced and mixed by Bob Clearmountain. "With its mystical lyrics the second album ... brought the group's own style more into focus". The album peaked at no. 10 and its first single, "Almost with You" resulted in a second Top 30 hit, peaking at no. 21.

Capitol declined to release The Blurred Crusade in North America and demanded that they write more radio-friendly material, as exemplified by their stable-mates Little River Band, which horrified the band. After another recording session, five new songs were offered to Capitol but the label was still unimpressed and dropped the band. The five songs were later released in Australia as the EP Sing-Songs, which reached the Top 100 Albums Chart in December. Meanwhile, their manager, Michael Chugg, arranged a U.K. tour supporting the hugely successful pop group Duran Duran, but after eight gigs The Church pulled out, feeling that audiences were unsympathetic. Chugg later recalled, "They were hard work. All four of them were strong-willed and had their own ideas of how things should be."

In May 1983, the band released their third album, Seance, co-produced by The Church and engineer John Bee (Hoodoo Gurus, Icehouse, The Divinyls), which peaked at No. 18. It used more keyboards and synthesizers and has been described as "That stark release [which] explored the band's darker side, and [whose] tracks ... were awash with strings and other effects". For Seance, the band employed mixing engineer Nick Launay, who had worked with Midnight Oil. He favoured a gated reverb drum sound, popular in the 1980s, which produced a staccato-like snare sound. Unsatisfied with this, the band asked Launay to redo the mix, but the effect was only lightened. The first single, "Electric Lash", featured this effect especially prominently.

Forgoing a full album, the band released two EPs in 1984, Remote Luxury in March and Persia in August, but only in Australia and New Zealand. Both EPs reached the Top 50 on the Australian Albums Chart. Again, almost all tracks were written by Kilbey, but compared to Seance, the atmosphere was lighter and less gloomy. The band's trademark guitar sound was complemented by the keyboards of guest musicians Davey Ray Moor (from the Crystal Set, which included Kilbey's brother Russell) and Craig Hooper (from the Reels), who joined as an auxiliary member. Hooper soon left to form the Mullanes. The band then signed to Warner Bros. Records in the United States. Internationally, the two EPs were repackaged as a single album titled Remote Luxury. Its U.S. release was their first record there since the debut album.

=== 1985–1988: Heyday, Starfish ===
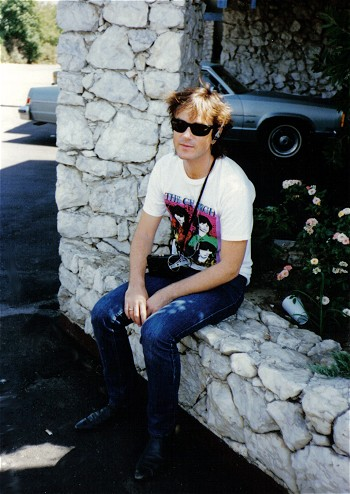
Steve Kilbey, California, 1986

The Church reconvened at Studios 301 in mid-1985 to work on their next album, Heyday, with British producer/engineer Peter Walsh (Simple Minds, Scott Walker, Peter Gabriel). Their first single in almost two years, "Already Yesterday", appeared in October and just made the Top 100. Heyday followed in November and brought new stylistic elements with the addition of real strings and horns, creating a warm, organic sound. The songs "were among the richest moments in The Church canon".

The album peaked in Australia at no. 19 and placed on the U.S. Billboard 200. A promotional tour started in April 1986, with concerts both at home and abroad. Unexpectedly, Willson-Piper suddenly quit mid-tour after rising in-band tensions and on 10 July, the Church performed as a three-piece in Hamburg, Germany. Willson-Piper returned within a week after Kilbey agreed that future releases would contain more group efforts.

Despite the charged atmosphere and warm press, low sales for the album's singles in Australia prompted EMI to drop them. Since the band had greater sales overseas than in Australia, they decided to record in a studio abroad and opted for a four-album deal with U.S. label Arista Records in 1987. For Australian releases they signed with Mushroom Records.

Recording sessions in Los Angeles, with producers Waddy Wachtel (Bob Dylan, Rolling Stones, Robbie Williams) and Greg Ladanyi (Warren Zevon, Jackson Browne, Fleetwood Mac), were a new challenge according to Kilbey: "It was Australian hippies versus West Coast guys who know the way they like to do things. We were a bit more undisciplined than they would have liked". Under pressure from the producers, Kilbey took vocal lessons, an experience he later regarded as valuable.

Four weeks of rehearsals resulted in Starfish, released in April 1988. The album found its way into the mainstream, marking a new worldwide commercial peak for the band. It reached no. 11 in Australia and the top 50 in the U.S. It was awarded a gold record in December 1992 by the RIAA. Also released in February, the single "Under the Milky Way" reached no. 24 on the U.S. Hot 100 and no. 22 in Australia, as well as entering the Canadian Top 100. It peaked at no. 2 on the Billboard Mainstream Rock Tracks. The song was written by Kilbey and then-girlfriend Karin Jansson (ex-Pink Champagne). "Under the Milky Way" won an ARIA Award in 1989 for Single of the Year. In 2008, readers of The Australian voted it the best Australian song of the last 20 years. In response, Kilbey said, "it's not really about anything at all. I just wanted to create an atmosphere and I didn't even put a lot of thought into that. History has given it something that it never really had". A second single from Starfish, "Reptile", charted on the Australian top 100 in August.

EMI responded with a double compilation album, Hindsight 1980-1987, which contained selections from the band's prior albums, together with hitherto-uncollected singles and B-sides. It peaked in the ARIA Top 40 Albums Chart in July.

=== 1989–1992: Gold Afternoon Fix, Priest=Aura ===
The Church promoted Starfish with a nine-month tour before they returned to the studio for a follow-up. With a U.S. Top 50 album under their belt, there was pressure from Arista to create another. The band started negotiations with former Led Zeppelin bass guitarist and keyboardist John Paul Jones, who had a reputation as a sophisticated producer, but the record company and management vetoed their suggestion. In an attempt to duplicate the success of Starfish, The Church returned to Los Angeles, with Waddy Wachtel producing.

Drummer Richard Ploog began to retreat further into his own drug habit as pressure from within the studio environment increased. The number of attempted studio takes spiralled, and Ploog's relationship with Kilbey deteriorated, accentuated by Wachtel's demands for a consistently reliable tempo. Eventually, Ploog's isolation led to exclusion, and his drum tracks were replaced by rigid, programmed drums on all but three tracks. He left the band after the sessions.

The resulting album, Gold Afternoon Fix, reached no. 12 on the ARIA Albums Chart. Gold Afternoon Fix was heavily backed by a promotional campaign from Arista, and the band went on tour, hiring Patti Smith's drummer Jay Dee Daugherty. The album spawned a hit single, "Metropolis" (no. 19 in Australia and no. 11 on U.S. Mainstream Rock), but the follow-up, "You're Still Beautiful", did not chart. Ultimately, the album's sales were lower than Starfish's, and press was mixed. The band, particularly Kilbey, would later dismiss the album as "lousy", "hashed together", and "hideous", although many of the songs have since become fixtures in the band's setlists.

The Church subsequently returned to Sydney's Studios 301 to commence work on their next album. With lowered commercial expectations and less pressure from Arista, the atmosphere was more relaxed. Bringing in British producer Gavin MacKillop (Barenaked Ladies, Toad the Wet Sprocket, Straitjacket Fits) to supervise the sessions, the band began to improvise the framework for the next set of songs.

Priest=Aura, titled from Kilbey's misreading of a Spanish fan's English vocabulary notes ('priest' = 'cura'), was their longest album yet, at 65 minutes. With song concepts derived from cryptic, one-word working titles (an idea originally proposed by Willson-Piper), the lyrics leaned towards the abstract and esoteric. Upon its release on 10 March 1992, Priest=Aura was given a mixed reception. It peaked in the ARIA Top 30. The band only went on a limited tour, confined to Australia, as Kilbey prepared for the birth of his twin daughters with Karin Jansson.

Adding to the decline in the Church's outlook was the announcement of Koppes' departure. His decision reflected two main factors: that the band had earned nothing for the two-week tour of Australia, and that he felt shut out of the creative process—a longstanding complaint that stretched back at least as far as Seance, if not further. In his 2014 autobiography, Something Quite Peculiar, Kilbey called Priest=Aura their "undisputed masterpiece", despite its muted reception at the time of release.

=== 1993–1996: Sometime Anywhere, Magician Among the Spirits ===
Despite the loss of Koppes, Arista decided to stand by the band's contract and back another Church album, and so Kilbey and Willson-Piper began to write new material. When it became clear that Daugherty would not be returning to the fold either, the remaining two took the opportunity to approach their music from new perspectives, abandoning their long-established roles and stylistic elements in favour of experimentation, spontaneity, and electronica.

Early in 1994, the two brought in Willson-Piper's childhood friend Andy 'Dare' Mason to produce, record, and mix. New Zealand drummer Tim Powles (ex-The Venetians) was hired for the sessions, having already played with Kilbey on his Jack Frost project. Considered temporary at the time, Powles would soon become a permanent member of the band.

The resulting album, Sometime Anywhere, was released in May 1994. It was described as a "rich, dark, epic release [which] picked up where Priest left off with lush, lengthy tracks". Although it reached the top 30 in Australia, sales, however, were paltry, and the first single, "Two Places at Once", did not chart. Promotion was minimal as Arista saw insufficient commercial promise in the release. With another commercially unsuccessful album on their hands, Arista did not renew The Church's contract and pulled financial support for a tour, leaving Kilbey and Willson-Piper to resort to only a short run of acoustic gigs as a duo.

Without a recording deal, the band's future looked bleak as Kilbey and Willson-Piper began work on new recordings in 1995. Although initially a two-man project, the new material saw input from new drummer Powles and hired violinist Linda Neil. Renewed contact between Kilbey and Peter Koppes led to the latter agreeing to guest on four songs. Simon Polinski (Yothu Yindi) was drafted in to co-produce, engineer, and mix the sessions. The music saw a return to guitar-based material, infused with krautrock and art rock influences. A 15-minute atmospheric piece called "Magician Among the Spirits" dominated the sessions, named after a book by Harry Houdini. Additional contributions by Utungun Percussion added a new, primal aspect to several songs.

The album, also called Magician Among the Spirits, was led by the single "Comedown". It was released on the band's own Deep Karma label, but due to financial constraints, they had to arrange outside distribution for the North American and European markets. Within a short time, the U.S. distributor went bankrupt, leaving the band stripped of its earnings from North American sales.

=== 1997–1999: The Refo:mation, Hologram of Baal, A Box of Birds ===
Following the commercial failure of Magician Among the Spirits, the members of the Church turned their attention to other projects. In Willson-Piper's absence, Kilbey, Powles, and Koppes spent some studio time together and quickly wrote and recorded an album entitled Pharmakoi/Distance-Crunching Honchos with Echo Units as the Refo:mation.

The members eventually regrouped, resulting in their first completely self-produced work, entitled Hologram of Baal, after the Canaanite god. Released under a new contract with the British independent label Cooking Vinyl, the album was distributed in the U.S. by Thirsty Ear. A limited edition featured a bonus disc with a nearly 80-minute continuous improvised instrumental, which received the original title of the album, Bastard Universe. A collection of cover songs was recorded in Sweden, shedding light on the band's influences. A Box of Birds arrived in August 1999, less than a year after Hologram of Baal.

=== 2000–2007: After Everything Now This, Forget Yourself, Uninvited, Like the Clouds ===
In 2001, "Under the Milky Way" was featured in the film Donnie Darko. Partially recorded in Sweden, NYC, and Australia, After Everything Now This was released in January 2002. Not long after, the double-disc remix/outtakes set Parallel Universe hit stores in late 2002. The first disc, subtitled "remixture", featured a reshuffled, remixed, electronic version of the After Everything Now This album, and the second disc, subtitled "mixture", compiled leftovers from the After Everything Now This sessions. Around the time that Parallel Universe was released, the Church had returned to the studio to record yet another album, eventually titled Forget Yourself, engineered and co-produced by Nic Hard and released in Australia in October 2003 and in the U.S. in February 2004.

Their prolific output continued into 2004, with the release of three ancillary albums. First, in August, came the entirely improvised album Jammed, containing just two long tracks and available exclusively from the band's website. Next, in October, came their third outtakes album, Beside Yourself, covering the Forget Yourself sessions. Finally, only six weeks later, came El Momento Descuidado, in which the band presented old and new material in an acoustic setting, for the Liberation Blue label. The title was a rough tongue-in-cheek translation of "The Unguarded Moment", a version of which was included. The album was eventually nominated in 2005 for "Best Adult Contemporary Album" at the Australian ARIA Music Awards, although it did not win.

Koppes, Kilbey, Powles, Willson-Piper on-stage. Park West, Chicago, 18 August 2006

In 2005, the Church began work on new material once again. The first release from these sessions was the outtakes album Back with Two Beasts, released via their website as a teaser for the main album which would follow a few months later. Uninvited, Like the Clouds, their 20th studio album, was released in April 2006. Just before its release, in March, they performed "Under the Milky Way" with the Melbourne Symphony Orchestra as part of the 2006 Commonwealth Games opening ceremony.

In February 2007 came El Momento Siguiente, a second album of acoustic re-interpretations of earlier songs plus several new compositions and a cover version of the Triffids song "Wide Open Road".

=== 2008–2011: Shriek, Untitled #23, ARIA Hall of Fame induction ===
In 2006, the Church had embarked on their third improvised music project: to provide the soundtrack for a short film based on the American science fiction writer Jeff VanderMeer's novel Shriek: An Afterword. The music was released in 2008 as the album Shriek: Excerpts from the Soundtrack, and was the first release on their new label, Unorthodox Records, a partnership with MGM Distribution.

Unorthodox Records released the album Untitled #23 in Australia in March, and the U.S. label Second Motion Records issued it to the rest of the world shortly thereafter. Kilbey also alluded to the mystical significance of the number 23 in an interview with the music publication Music Feeds.

On 27 October 2010, the Church were inducted into the Australian Recording Industry Association Hall of Fame by media commentator George Negus, while young pop singer Washington performed "The Unguarded Moment". After their acceptance speech, the band performed "Under the Milky Way" and "Tantalized".

The Church travelled to the U.S. once again in February 2011 in full electric mode for the Future Past Perfect tour, performing three albums in their entirety: Untitled #23, Priest=Aura, and Starfish. This tour was the first on which the band was joined onstage by the Australian multi-instrumentalist Craig Wilson, from the band ASTREETLIGHTSONG. A previous show on 17 December 2010 at the Enmore Theatre, Sydney, was filmed and made available to stream online.

On 10 April 2010, the band celebrated their 30th anniversary with a special show entitled "A Psychedelic Symphony" at the Sydney Opera House, which had been a year in preparation. They were accompanied by conductor George Ellis and his symphony orchestra. A DVD and double CD were released by Unorthodox in June 2014, the band's first official live album.

=== 2012-2019: Royalty dispute, member departures, new releases ===
In March 2013, there were signs of internal problems in the band when Kilbey issued a series of statements that indicated that he was considering leaving the Church due to a dispute over royalty payments. Then, later in the year, Kilbey announced on the band's Facebook page that Willson-Piper would not be returning and had been replaced by former Powderfinger guitarist Ian Haug. Kilbey explained that Willson-Piper was "not available" for the recording of a new album and subsequent touring, and he praised Haug as "a brilliant guitarist". Kilbey also provided a pre-emptive response to disgruntled fans: "... if you can't dig it I'm sorry. this is my fucking band after all and it has existed at times without Peter and in the beginning without Marty."

In early October 2014, Kilbey explained that Willson-Piper was not asked to leave the band but that he had simply not replied to the various attempts made to contact him. Realizing that Willson-Piper would not respond, and in agreement with Powles at the time, Kilbey said "we have to find someone with stature. ... He has to have his own trip, he can't be some weedy little guy coming in to play guitar. It has to be somebody with experience and gravitas." As part of the same interview, Haug explained that he had received a phone call from Kilbey while he was returning home from a funeral. Without first greeting Haug, Kilbey simply asked, "If I asked you to join the Church, what would you say?", and ended the call after Haug's affirmative, but bewildered, response. Haug said that joining the Church was the "last thing" that would have entered his mind but that "it just really seemed to work".

Entitled Further/Deeper, the Church's 24th studio album was released on 17 October 2014 and was recorded over a period of eight days in late 2013. 2017 brought the release of the band's subsequent album, Man Woman Life Death Infinity, on 6 October. It was preceded by two singles, "Another Century" and "Undersea".

=== 2020-present: Expanded lineup, resurgence, and further critical acclaim ===
On 1 February 2020, Kilbey announced on Facebook that founding member Peter Koppes had departed the group to "explore his own musical path". He noted that, after more than forty years, it was natural for the band's lineup to evolve, and he praised Koppes for making "the hugest contribution to the Church's sound". The announcement left Kilbey as the sole remaining original member. At the same time, Kilbey confirmed that touring multi‑instrumentalist Jeffrey Cain had been promoted to full membership and that Even guitarist Ashley Naylor had joined the lineup, alongside long‑time drummer Tim Powles and guitarist Ian Haug.

The onset of the COVID‑19 pandemic disrupted touring schedules, and the band was forced to cancel appearances, including a planned performance at the 2022 Corona Capital festival in Mexico City, after Kilbey and Naylor tested positive for COVID‑19. During this period, the group concentrated on writing and recording new material. The Church returned in February 2023 with their twenty‑sixth studio record, The Hypnogogue. A concept album set in 2054, it tells the story of a fading rock star who uses a dream‑extracting machine to create music.

On 29 March 2024, the band released their twenty‑seventh studio album, Eros Zeta and the Perfumed Guitars. Conceived as a "companion piece" to The Hypnogogue, it continues the science‑fiction narrative of doomed pop star Eros Zeta. Several tracks, including "Realm of Minor Angels" and "Pleasure", were previewed during the band's 2023 North American tour, where the album was sold in advance. The release coincided with Kilbey's publication of a companion novel, Eros Zeta and the Hypnogogue, which expanded the storyline.

On 5 November 2025, the band released the single "Sacred Echoes (Part Two)". Kilbey commented that it "is unlike any previous Church song ever with its almost orchestral climaxes and its sombre mood".

== Band members ==
=== Current members ===
- Steve Kilbey – bass, lead vocals, keyboards, guitars (1980–present)
- Tim Powles – drums, percussion, backing vocals, guitars, keyboards (1994–present)
- Ian Haug – guitars, backing vocals (2013–present)
- Jeffrey Cain – guitars, bass, keyboards, backing vocals (2020–present; touring 2017–2019)
- Ashley Naylor – guitars, backing vocals (2020–present)

=== Current touring musicians ===
- Nicholas Meredith – drums, percussion (2022–present)

=== Former members ===
- Peter Koppes – guitars, keyboards, vocals (1980–1992, 1997–2019)
- Nick Ward – drums, percussion, backing vocals (1980–1981)
- Marty Willson-Piper – guitars, vocals, bass (1980–2013)
- Richard Ploog – drums, percussion (1981–1990)
- Jay Dee Daugherty – drums, percussion (1990–1993)

=== Former touring musicians ===
- Craig Wilson – guitars, bass, keyboards, backing vocals (2009–2017, 2021)

== Discography ==
- Of Skins and Heart (1981) (released internationally as The Church in 1982)
- The Blurred Crusade (1982)
- Seance (1983)
- Heyday (1985)
- Starfish (1988)
- Gold Afternoon Fix (1990)
- Priest=Aura (1992)
- Sometime Anywhere (1994)
- Magician Among the Spirits (1996)
- Hologram of Baal (1998)
- A Box of Birds (1999)
- After Everything Now This (2002)
- Parallel Universe (2002)
- Forget Yourself (2003)
- Jammed (2004)
- Beside Yourself (2004)
- El Momento Descuidado (2004)
- Back with Two Beasts (2005)
- Uninvited, Like the Clouds (2006)
- El Momento Siguiente (2007)
- Shriek (Excerpts from the Soundtrack) (2008)
- Untitled #23 (2009)
- Further/Deeper (2014)
- Man Woman Life Death Infinity (2017)
- The Hypnogogue (2023)
- Eros Zeta and the Perfumed Guitars (2024)
- Lacuna (2026)

== Awards and nominations ==
=== ARIA Music Awards ===
The ARIA Music Awards is an annual ceremony presented by Australian Recording Industry Association (ARIA), which recognise excellence, innovation, and achievement across all genres of the music of Australia. They commenced in 1987.

Year	Nominee / work	Award	Result	Ref.
1989	"Under the Milky Way"	Single of the Year	Won	
1989	"Under the Milky Way"	Song of the Year	Nominated	
2005	El Momento Descuidado	Best Adult Contemporary Album	Nominated	
2010	The Church	ARIA Hall of Fame	inducted	

=== Helpmann Awards ===
The Helpmann Awards is a ceremony celebrating live entertainment and performing arts in Australia, presented by the industry group Live Performance Australia since 2001. Note: 2020 and 2021 were cancelled due to the COVID-19 pandemic.

Year	Nominee / work	Award	Result	Ref.
2011	"A Psychedelic Symphony" – 30th Anniversary Concert	Best Australian Contemporary Concert	Nominated	
