= Richard Ploog =

- Born: Richard John Ploog; 29 October 1962 (age 63); Adelaide, South Australia, Australia
- Genre: Rock
- Occupations: Musician, songwriter
- Instruments: Drums, percussion, backing vocals
- Years active: 1980–present
- Labels: Carrere, Capitol

Richard John Ploog (born 29 October 1962) is an Australian drummer, songwriter, producer and singer who was a member of the rock band The Church between 1981 and 1990. Ploog also drummed for Beasts of Bourbon in 1983, Damien Lovelock in 1988 and with fellow The Church member Peter Koppes in 1991 for an album and tour. He is the father of Irie Ploog, Ruben Ploog, Ollie Ploog, Alice Ploog and Gene Ploog

== Biography ==
Richard John Ploog was born on 29 October 1962 and is from Adelaide, South Australia. As a drummer, he joined various bands, including, The Name Droppers, The Brats and Exhibit A. In early 1981, at the age of 18, he replaced The Church's founding drummer, Nick Ward. In April the band released their debut album, Of Skins and Heart and the associated single, "The Unguarded Moment", which had been recorded late the previous year with Ward. Ploog's first recording with The Church was the five-track double single, "Too Fast for You" released in July. When Of Skins and Heart was released internationally (Carrere for Europe, Capitol for North America) it was re-titled as The Church with "Tear It All Away" replacing the original track "Fighter Pilot...Korean War". On early record covers of The Church, Ploog was incorrectly credited with all the drumming—Ward is not listed.

Aside from drumming, Ploog also contributed songwriting to The Church's releases. He also became involved in various side projects. Firstly, with Beasts of Bourbon as a drummer in 1983 and then performing with its members, Tex Perkins on vocals and Kim Salmon on guitar and harmonica, as Salamander Jim in February 1984. He worked on The Celibate Rifles' vocalist Damien Lovelock's debut solo album, Wig Wig Wig Wig World in 1988.

Ploog left The Church after recording their seventh album, Gold Afternoon Fix which was released in February 1990. According to Steve Kilbey, he left the band "because of musical personal differences." He was replaced by Jay Dee Daugherty (ex-Patti Smith Group). Ploog joined The Church member Peter Koppes' group The Well to tour and record From the Well (1990) and Iridescence (1991).

Ploog has also drummed for The Wigmen, The Deadly Hume, Funkicide, and The Sleep-ins.

Ploog returned to live drumming in 2013 with a series of gigs accompanying Steve Kilbey and Mark Gable.

He is also a member of Groom Epoch. The band has released three albums, Scalar Trails (2014), Solar Warden (2018) and Initiation (2019).
