= Peter Koppes =

Australian guitarist

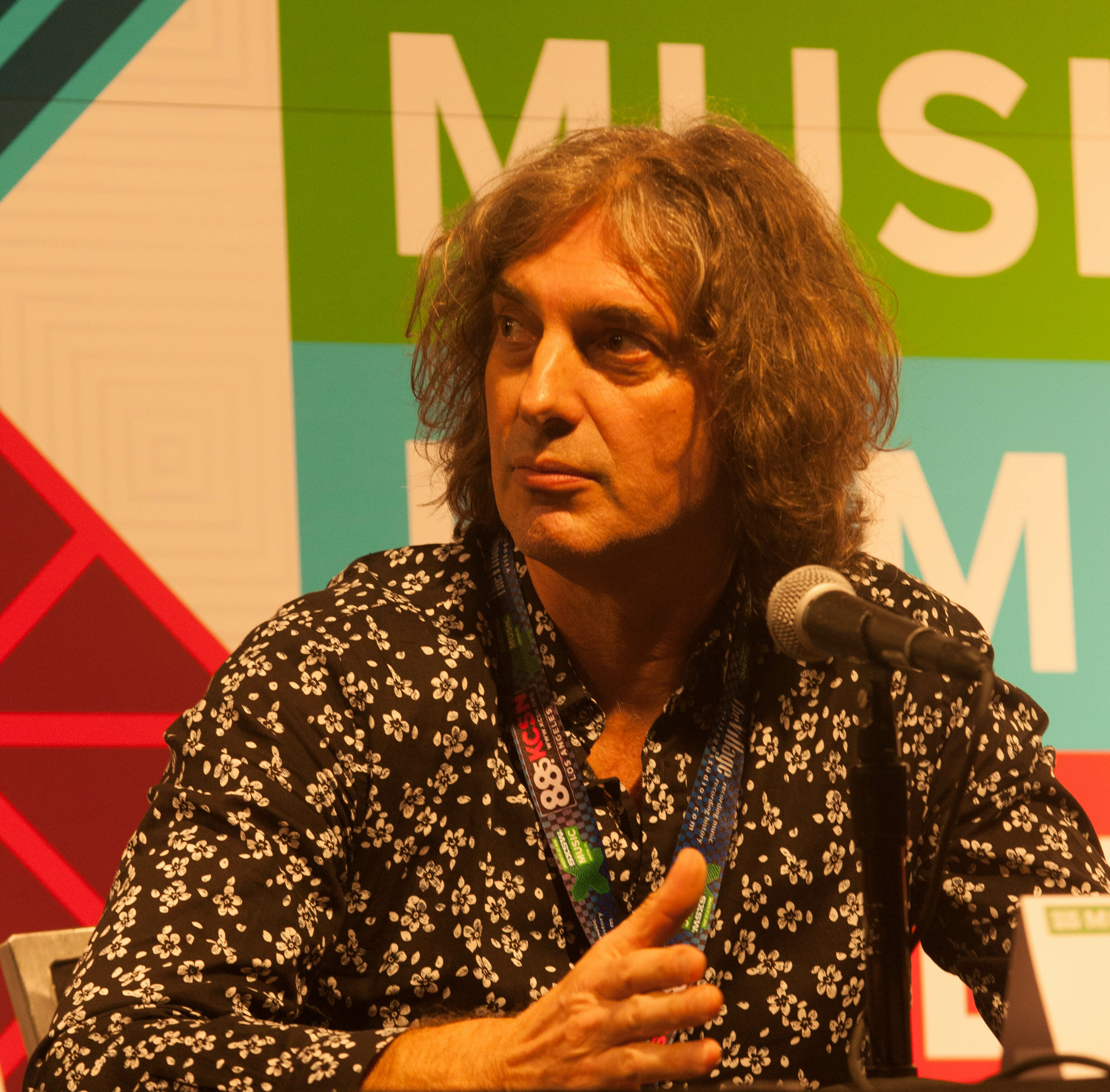
- Koppes in 2015

Background information
- Born: 21 November 1955 (age 71); Canberra, Australian Capital Territory, Australia
- Genre: Alternative rock
- Occupation: Musician
- Instruments: Guitar, vocals
- Years active: 1967–present
- Website: peterkoppes.com

Peter Koppes (born 21 November 1955) is an Australian guitarist, best known as a founding and almost-continuous member of the independent rock band The Church. He is a multi-instrumentalist, also playing mandolin, drums, piano, and harmonica. He has also released various solo albums and various recordings with his group The Well (1989–1995). Koppes lives on the Australian Central Coast in NSW but sometimes spends time on the Sunshine Coast in Queensland where he sometimes produces albums and has previously conducted seasonal 'song writing' and 'performance for demo recording' short courses at Nambour TAFE, as well as offering private tuition in guitar, bass, drums and song writing. His daughters are Tatiana 'O' Koppes and Neige Koppes who had their own band, Rain Party (formerly they played with The Kicks a.k.a. Bright Red) but now have independent solo careers.

Koppes has said that he comes from a mixed European ancestry: "My father's ancestry is Dutch, and there's southern French and Portuguese possibly. And my mother's ancestry is northern German but she says there's a Danish ancestor. The problem is she's got brown eyes and my grandmother had brown eyes and that's just not a Teutonic thing . Once she said we might have Gypsy blood...I've come to think I've got that spirit."

== Early years ==
Koppes spent his teenage years in Canberra in the 1970s. In the early 1970s Canberra was in the midst of an upswing in the wake of Gough Whitlam's election. "I found Canberra an interesting place," Koppes remembers. "As I grew up I met some of the most interesting people. Canberra's got some pretty interesting attributes – it's got the highest rate of occultism, and the highest rate of adultery. It's a quiet place, but with a seedy underbelly. I definitely enjoyed the perspective I got while I was there – it gave me a blank canvass from which to work."

Whilst growing up in Canberra in a musical family the sounds of the Hammond organ originally captivated him, and so began his journey as a musician. "I started playing drums with an interest in The Shadows, and then Jimi Hendrix's Mitch Mitchell really inspired me with his jazz style. I think Santana had the same effect and the guitar playing seeped into me as well, although, musically I think of Pink Floyd as my template for a band".

Peter was 12 when he became the drummer at school in a rock band called Bacchus Marsh. He then learned guitar from the members of this early group. Later, with another band called Timelord he played guitar, rehearsing in a local church hall. Steve Kilbey, who would later become his colleague in The Church, had a glam rock band called Beyond Beavers that would play there too. An invitation came in 1974 to replace one of the two drummers with Steve's band after they witnessed a drum solo he played on his drummer's kit.

Peter joined, but the singer left and they became Precious Little, with Steve on vocals.

Soon after, he reverted to guitarist as they transmuted into Baby Grande, with the addition of guitarist Dave Scotland and friend Joe Lee on bass. This two and a half year collaboration eventuated in some recordings, but he left to go to college studying electronics and engineering.

After 12 months he decided to sell up and go to England/Europe for a year with a guitar, whence he began writing folk songs. Significant time was spent in Stockholm, Berlin, and London as well as on a tug boat on the waterways of Holland. An Eastern musical influence that appeared on his 1992 album Water-Rites may have been as a result of 2 weeks spent in Morocco.

== Career ==
=== The Church ===
On his return in March 1980, Koppes went to Sydney and formed a three-piece band, Limazine, in Sydney with Nick Ward (AKA Nigel Murray) on drums, and began performing. It was not long before Koppes again teamed up to play music with Steve Kilbey who had recently moved there too. Following an invitation to play a support from a manager/promoter friend, they formed The Church. Supposedly, the name was chosen as it was unclaimed, but later allusions to spiritual interests by Kilbey hint that it was less coincidental, and it has been stated in Robert Dean Lurie's book on Steve Kilbey that the name comes from a line in the David Bowie song "Moonage Daydream": 'The Church of Man, love, Is such a holy place to be'. At this time, Marty Willson-Piper (originally from Liverpool, United Kingdom) arrived in Australia. He attended a show with a friend of Koppes and was asked to join the band because he could play guitar, looked like he belonged in the band, and the music needed another player to develop it further. Initially, only Koppes was a fully proficient musician, Kilbey was an erratic bass guitarist and Willson-Piper was searching for his guitar style. Included in the original Church lineup was ex-Limazine drummer Nick Ward, who had been a school colleague of Steve's. Together they arranged and completed Kilbey's song ideas, and made a demo tape utilising studio time at a friend's 4 Track studio to record backing tracks that would later be overdubbed at home using Steve and Nick's recorders.

Willson-Piper contributed to the demo, and with Koppes spent a week arranging his parts for some live shows. At the same time Koppes had garnered interest from publisher Chris Gilbey, of The Beatles' publishing company Northern Songs who then witnessed the first and only rehearsal with Willson-Piper before the gigs, however he missed the first show and the second was cancelled due to the band not wanting to risk being unable to pay for the PA and lights. Koppes then announced to Chris that the band couldn't continue and was disbanding. Gilbey said he would sign the band anyway, paying them a stipend, putting them in a rehearsal studio, recording an album. Gilbey found them an agent, leading to a record release with EMI.

The Church achieved early chart success in Australia with songs such as 'The Unguarded Moment' and 'Almost With You' that were also released internationally. The band also gained recognition for its distinctive jangling harmony guitar style which was originally instigated by Koppes and sometimes mistakenly attributed solely to 12 string electric guitar.

Soon after recording the second album The Blurred Crusade however, Koppes became disenchanted with several non-musical aspects of the band and intended to depart. He was convinced to return to participate in an Australian tour to promote the album which was then followed by a US visit with Kilbey to meet Capitol Records who were interested in signing the band.

Thereafter Koppes continued with The Church to tour internationally, recording several more albums, though he recommenced writing and recording his own songs. His song 'As You Will' was included as a B/side and extra CD track for the band's Heyday album and some of the demos were released in 1987 as an EP called 'When Reason Forbids - A Requiem' and the album 'Manchild And Myth' on an independent Australian label, Session Records. Later Rykodisc would combine them for release in the USA where the record attracted favourable notice in Billboard magazine's 'Recommended' section.

In 1988, The Church had strong chart success in the US and Australia with 'Under The Milky Way' and its corresponding album Starfish which included a song written earlier by Koppes called 'A New Season". Pressures and extended absences may have brought about the split in Koppes's marriage, a topic which features in some songs on his second album 'From The Well' recorded and released soon after. At the time, Steve also invited Koppes to write and record some songs for his double solo album Remindlessness and he contributed "Danielle" and "Soul Sample".

The Church then recorded Gold Afternoon Fix, which featured Koppes's song "Transient". This soon became a fan favourite and a much loved inclusion in their live set. This was followed by the album 'Priest=Aura'. Koppes had at that stage been a continuous (as well as founding) member of The Church, except for the four-year period 1992–1996. Due to mounting frustrations with artistic constraints on his input, Peter again felt disconnected from the band. Koppes' decision to leave The Church reflected two main factors; the band earned zero dollars for the two-week tour of Australia after all expenses had been paid, and secondly, he continued to feel shut out of the creative process - a long-standing complaint that stretched back at least as far as the Seance days, if not further. After recording the Priest=Aura album with the band, Koppes departed, leaving Steve Kilbey and Marty Willson-Piper the only remaining members. Temporary drummer Jay Dee Daugherty (Patti Smith Group) played with the lineup for a while. Kilbey and Willson-Piper recorded Sometime Anywhere as The Church even though they were at that time effectively a duo.

Koppes pursued his interest in his solo band The Well with ex-Flowers/Icehouse keyboardist Anthony Smith, and bassist Jim Leone of the Celibate Rifles. This band also included recently removed drummer of The Church, Richard Ploog, who had earlier invited Koppes to record and perform with Celibate Rifles' Damien Lovelock's solo project The Wigmen. They also performed some of Koppes's songs from his first album when they played live.

=== Solo albums, The Well, collaborations with Margot Smith ===
As well as his contributions to The Church, Koppes has also released several solo albums, and albums with his group The Well (1989–1995), which largely occupied his time on hiatus from The Church. The Well featured former Church drummer Richard Ploog on drums, Anthony Smith (inaugural keyboardist for Flowers/Icehouse) and Jim Leone of The Celibate Rifles on bass. The Well played live and recorded songs that were released as an EP called Iridescence and later the fan favourite solo album Water Rites.

There was still contact with Steve Kilbey, who asked Koppes to play guitar on some songs for albums he was producing, Australian artists Margot Smith's Adored and Lifetime, Stephen Cummings' Everything Breaks Your Heart, and Canadian Mae Moore's Full Circle.

Koppes collaborated on songwriting with singer Margot Smith, and played in her live band. (Steve Kilbey and Tim Powles also co-wrote, played and/or produced some of Smith's material on her first two albums Sleeping with the Lions (1993) and Taste (1998). Smith died in 2011; her third album Inhumaninane was released posthumously.

=== The Church: Back in the Fold ===
Koppes returned to The Church as a guest player on the album Magician Among the Spirits in 1996. In 1997 Koppes participated in what would become a new incarnation of the Church - under the title of The Refo:mation, Koppes, Kilbey and new drummer Powles (who had debuted on Sometime Anywhere) recorded the album Pharmakoi/Distance-Crunching Honchos with Echo Units.

This reunification of sorts led to a suggestion that The Church reform for a tour to raise interest and funds for recording another album. This it did, producing Hologram of Baal released in 1998, marking Koppes' formal return to the Church fold.

During this same period Koppes's Immersion Music record label was set up in partnership with mentor Sebastian Chase of MGM Distribution, to represent his previous solo catalogue and new solo release 'Love Era/Irony'. Included, was an album by Margot Smith called 'Taste' which featured Peter, Steve Kilbey and Tim Powles.

The Church, reinvigorated, has since released more albums including the A Box of Birds covers album, and After Everything Now This. On the Parallel Universe album, Peter sang the psychedelic 'Reward', on Forget Yourself, 'Appalatia', on Uninvited, Like the Clouds he sings 'Never Before', and on Untitled #23 vinyl edition, 'LLC ' (an anagram for Little Love Central).

In 2002, Koppes released his 5th solo album 'Simple Intent'. He was involved in various stints including co-writing and recording the song "Moon Over Water" with Sydneysider New Folk artist David Lane in 2003, and as session guitarist on various tracks of Australian Hip Hop artist Figg Kidd's 2003 major label album, 'What Is Figg Kidd?'.

Since relocation to the Sunshine Coast in Queensland Australia in 2004, Koppes has developed a songwriting relationship with fellow local/international singer/songwriter Michelle Bradford-Jones. They produced soundtrack material and anthem song 'Journey of Friends ' for a fundraising cancer benefit documentary commemorating the Smiling For Smiddy Foundation.

=== 2019 and after: Work since leaving the Church ===
Not announced officially until mid 2020 was Koppes' departure again from The Church in mid-2019, following cancellation of the rest of the year's touring due to Tim Powles' severe foot injury sustained on the last date of that USA tour.

Since then he has produced and played on songs by emerging young local female singer songwriter Mayah, whose 2019 debut single 'Endless Mistakes' achieved almost 500,000 streams within a year, and a second single 'Butterflies (The Rush Inside)', released in early 2020, achieved 40,000 streams in six months. Live streams of three performances were made together during the CoronaVirus-19 pandemic.

In July 2020, an EP released by Emma Tomlinson, also a Sunshine Coast singer-songwriter, featured Koppes on finger-style nylon guitar and Ebow electric guitar, for the highlight track 'Silver Lightning'. They have also appeared live together on occasions, such as Emma's sold-out show for Noosa Alive Festival in 2019.

In September 2020 following two singles and an EP, Koppes' recording ensemble Syncretism, with guitarist Dave Scotland released the 'Lone Drifters?' album. Scotland had been a fellow member of Baby Grande, the Canberra glam rock band founded in the 1970s with Steve Kilbey later of The Church. The album is a co-production of Scotland's songs and Koppes' lyrics.

In August 2022 an album of 56 short piano instrumentals with orchestral effects was released exemplifying revolutionary music theory relating to Modes and Scales associated with Augmented Chords and Diminished Chords as well as the previously unidentified seven note scale/mode for the Dominant7#9 chord also known as unofficially as the Hendrix Chord.

== Discography ==
- 1987 When Reason Forbids: A Requiem (vinyl EP, Session Records & Rykodisc). Tracks: 'When Reason Forbids'; 'At the Castle' (instrumental);'Air' (instrumental). Note: All three tracks are included on the Rykodisc release (only) of the album Manchild and Myth.
- 1988 Manchild and Myth (Vinyl album, Session Records (Australia) & Rykodisc (USA) vinyl and CD). Tracks: 'Take a Vow'; 'These Three things'; 'The Wise and the Wicked'; 'What's the Matter'; 'Quest'; 'Comes As No Surprise'; 'Opus' (instrumental); 'Sahara' (instrumental); 'The Colosseum'; 'A Drink from the Cup';'Into the Bright Light'; 'Let You Walk Away'; Our Love'; 'When Reason Forbids'; 'At the Castle'; 'Air'. The last three tracks only appear on the expanded Rykodisc release of this album.
- 1989 From the Well (Vinyl LP and CD; TVT Records(Australia); CD - EMI Records)Tracks: In the Wake; Her Mark; Only Wait; Horses in the Sand; Lost Peace, The; Pyramid Building (She's Leaving); I Wonder; Lullaby; Desert Flower Bride; Nursery Fugue; Testing 3. 2. 1.; Aural Garden; Anthem. Note "Her Mark" was later included on the 1991 vinyl EP, Iridescence.
- 1991 Iridescence (Vinyl EP credited to Peter Koppes and The Well. (Phantom Records) Tracks: 'Peak to Peak'; 'Her Mark'; 'The Destroyer'. Note: 'Her Mark' appeared previously on the 1989 album From the Well. All three tracks are collected on the 2007 2-CD compilation Misty Heights and Cloudy Memories: 1987-2002
- 1995 Water Rites (CD; credited to Peter Koppes and The Well)(World Water Records and Immersion)
- 1998 Love Era/Irony (CD; Immersion Records/Phantom Records (Australia)). Tracks: 'Celebration'; 'Thankyou'; 'Two in a Million'; 'Come a Day'; 'Sound'; 'Apex Farmer'; 'Oblivion and Beyond'; 'Message'; 'Make a Move'; 'Luminous'; Esoterica'.
- 2002 Simple Intent (CD; MGM Records); release on Immersion Records 2006. Tracks: 'Naked Soul'; 'Blame';'Dedication'; 'Drink?'; 'Leaving'; 'Met Her Today'; 'Natural'; 'Sleeping in My Heart'; 'Voyager'; 'Walk With you'; 'Winter'.
- 2007 Misty Heights and Cloudy Memories 1987-2002 (2 CD compilation, Immersion Records)(includes 2 previously unreleased tracks)
  - DISC 1: 1. Met Her Today 2. Naked Soul 3. Blame 4. Leaving 5. Thank You 6. Celebration 7. Sound 8. Two in a Million 9. Oblivion & Beyond 10. Make a Move 11. Grasshrooms 12. Caravan 13. Arabia 14. Sublimation 15. House Afire 16. Spirit March 17. On Wings of Love
  - DISC 2: 1. Peak to Peak 2. Her Mark 3. Destroyer 4. I Wonder 5. Lost Peace 6. Horses in the Sand 7. Desert Flower Bride 8. Testing 3.2.1. 9. Take a Vow 10. These Three Things 11. Comes as No Surprise 12. Drink from the Cup 13. Our Love 14. When Reason Forbids 15. Waiting 16. Soliloquy
- 2020 Lone Drifters? (credited to Syncretism - digital download album with booklet)(Immersion Records)
- 2022 Music Evolution Therapy (Immersion Records/MGM Distribution 2022) 56 short instrumental piano tracks for music theory reference
