= Tim Powles =

New Zealand record producer (born 1959)

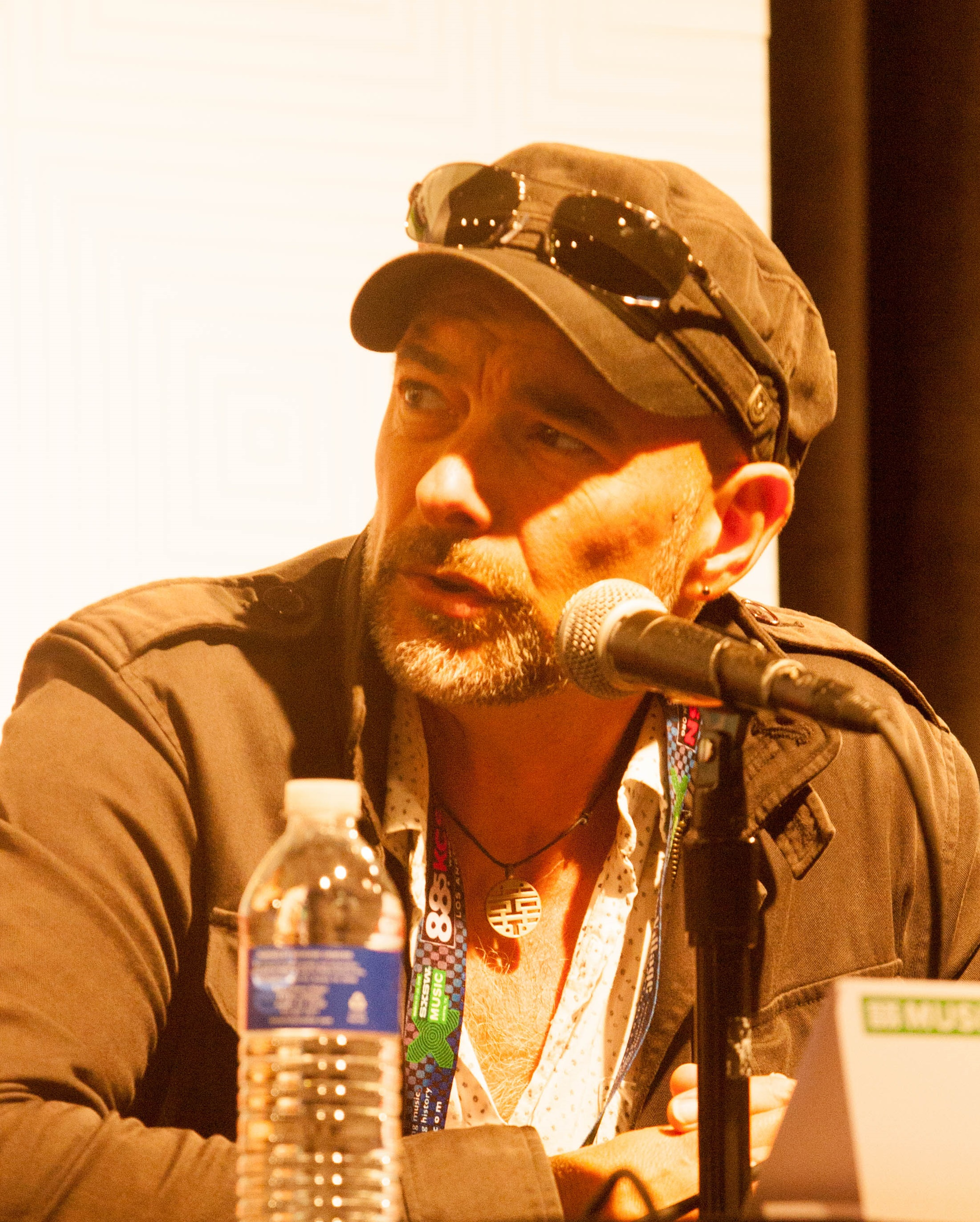
- Powles in 2015

Background information
- Born: Timothy Guy Gerard Powles; 21 December 1959 (age 66); Wellington, New Zealand
- Genres: Alternative, electronica, rock
- Occupations: Record producer, musician, composer
- Instruments: Drums, keyboards, bass, synthesisers, programmers
- Years active: 1973–present

Timothy Guy Gerard Powles (born 21 December 1959) is a New Zealand music producer and artist. Also known as timEbandit Powles, he primarily plays the drums and percussion.

== Early career ==
Powles started his music career at Nelson College, which he attended from 1973 to 1977. He subsequently moved to Wellington and then Auckland to join the band Flight X-7. In the 1970s, he won a scholarship to join the New Zealand Youth Orchestra in a training camp in Cambridge. He took interest in both classical and rock orchestrations and ambience.

Powles eventually moved to Australia in 1981 where he first became known in 1980s' band The Venetians. He learned music production while working with Vic Coppersmith-Heaven and Mark Goldenberg, and locals Mark Opitz and Mark Moffatt, often in the Festival Records Studios.

== The Church ==
Powles started working with the Church in 1994, with the album Sometime Anywhere (though he was misidentified as "Tim Powell" on the liner notes of that album). He became a permanent member of the band in the year following. He sings the lead vocal on the track "Take Your Place" on their album Pharmakoi/Distance Crunching Honchos with Echo Units (1996, as The Refo:mation, Phantom Records) and has worked on all of their many releases since, as a musician and composer, and taking production responsibilities on all levels. Powles, as a member of the Church, was inducted into the ARIA Hall of Fame on 27 October 2010, coinciding with the band's 30-year anniversary celebrations and touring.

While he was with The Church, Powles co-directed and co-produced A Psychedelic Symphony - The Church and the George Ellis Orchestra at the Sydney Opera House, a sold-out show in April 2011. He produced the band's 25th album Further/Deeper in 2014, and the band toured that album extensively through Europe and the United States in 2015 and 2016.

== Production work ==
Powles resides in Sydney, Australia, and has his own recording studio; the current version is called Spacejunk III. Amongst others, Poweles has produced albums, EPs, and singles of varying genres and styles for Skulker (debut), Switchkicker (debut), The Camels (debut), Regular John (debut and the follow-up Strange Flowers), Jack River (Holly Rankin project), Hammock Departure Songs (double album, mixed in Nashville), The Khanz (numerous singles and two EPs), Iota and the Beauty Queens, Laura Imbruglia (debut), Winters Wish, Montpelier, and The Faults.

Powles released a solo album, Tyg's in Space, on Spacejunk through Phantom Records in 1999. He features with a cameo vocal on Nashville post-rock ambient band Hammock's EP Asleep In The Downlights, a band whose most recent albums he has co-produced and/or mixed.
