= Triple J's Hot 100 of 1990 =

Australian record chart of songs in 1990

1990 Triple J Hottest 100

Countdown details
- Date of countdown: 20 May 1990

Countdown highlights
- Winning song: Joy Division "Love Will Tear Us Apart"
- Most entries: The Cure (7 tracks)

Chronology
← Previous; 1989	Next → 1991

The 1990 Triple J Hottest 100, also known as the 1990 Triple J Hot 100, was announced on 20 May 1990. It was the second annual poll of the most popular songs of all time, according to listeners of the Australian radio station Triple J. From 1989 to 1991, listeners could vote for songs released in any year.

This was the final countdown to be referred to as a "Hot 100" as Triple J was later forced to change the poll's name to 'Hottest 100' to avoid legal action with 4ZZZ.

== Full list ==
Note: Australian artists

#	Song	Artist	Country of origin	Year of release	Previous year position
1	Love Will Tear Us Apart	Joy Division	United Kingdom	1980	1
2	Throw Your Arms Around Me	Hunters & Collectors	Australia	1984	2
3	How Soon Is Now?	The Smiths	United Kingdom	1984	7
4	Uncertain Smile	The The	United Kingdom	1983	3
5	Blue Monday	New Order	United Kingdom	1983	5
6	Fools Gold	The Stone Roses	United Kingdom	1989	
7	This Charming Man	The Smiths	United Kingdom	1983	13
8	Rock Lobster	The B-52's	United States	1978	14
9	It's the End of the World as We Know It (And I Feel Fine)	R.E.M.	United States	1987	22
10	That's Entertainment	The Jam	United Kingdom	1980	4
11	A Forest	The Cure	United Kingdom	1980	10
12	Holiday in Cambodia	Dead Kennedys	United States	1980	6
13	Troy	Sinéad O'Connor	Ireland	1987	41
14	Under the Milky Way	The Church	Australia	1988	
15	Shivers	The Boys Next Door	Australia	1978	12
16	Birthday	The Sugarcubes	Iceland	1987	9
17	Wuthering Heights	Kate Bush	United Kingdom	1978	43
18	Debaser	Pixies	United States	1988	
19	Primary	The Cure	United Kingdom	1981	19
20	Anarchy in the U.K.	Sex Pistols	United Kingdom	1976	17
21	Bizarre Love Triangle	New Order	United Kingdom	1986	67
22	She Sells Sanctuary	The Cult	United Kingdom	1985	35
23	Boys Don't Cry	The Cure	United Kingdom	1979	29
24	Ride on Time	Black Box	Italy	1989	
25	Just Like Heaven	The Cure	United Kingdom	1987	
26	Betty's Worry or the Slab	Hunters & Collectors	Australia	1984	83
27	Cattle and Cane	The Go-Betweens	Australia	1983	11
28	London Calling	The Clash	United Kingdom	1979	18
29	Fight the Power	Public Enemy	United States	1989	
30	Another Girl, Another Planet	The Only Ones	United Kingdom	1978	26
31	Song to the Siren	This Mortal Coil	United Kingdom	1983	15
32	Talking to a Stranger	Hunters & Collectors	Australia	1982	8
33	Fuck tha Police	N.W.A	United States	1988	
34	Monkey Gone to Heaven	Pixies	United States	1989	
35	Wish You Were Here	Pink Floyd	United Kingdom	1975	33
36	Buffalo Stance	Neneh Cherry	Sweden	1988	61
37	Sign o' the Times	Prince	United States	1987	37
38	Tainted Love	Soft Cell	United Kingdom	1981	
39	Kiss	Prince & the Revolution	United States	1986	24
40	Back to Life (However Do You Want Me)	Soul II Soul	United Kingdom	1989	
41	Blister in the Sun	Violent Femmes	United States	1983	46
42	Respect	Aretha Franklin	United States	1967	21
43	Lullaby	The Cure	United Kingdom	1989	
44	There Is a Light That Never Goes Out	The Smiths	United Kingdom	1985	64
45	Info Freako	Jesus Jones	United Kingdom	1989	
46	The One I Love	R.E.M.	United States	1987	45
47	Everybody Moves	Died Pretty	Australia	1989	
48	Dancing Queen	ABBA	Sweden	1976	
49	Wide Open Road	The Triffids	Australia	1986	68
50	"Heroes"	David Bowie	United Kingdom	1977	39
51	She Bangs the Drums	The Stone Roses	United Kingdom	1989	
52	The End	The Doors	United States	1967	50
53	Bigmouth Strikes Again	The Smiths	United Kingdom	1986	27
54	Aloha Steve and Danno	Radio Birdman	Australia	1978	23
55	Here Comes Your Man	Pixies	United States	1989	
56	Can't Be Sure	The Sundays	United Kingdom	1989	
57	The Unguarded Moment	The Church	Australia	1981	42
58	Waiting for the Great Leap Forwards	Billy Bragg	United Kingdom	1988	20
59	Greetings to the New Brunette	Billy Bragg	United Kingdom	1986	38
60	Deanna	Nick Cave & the Bad Seeds	Australia	1988	70
61	Stairway to Heaven	Led Zeppelin	United Kingdom	1971	30
62	L.A. Woman	The Doors	United States	1971	40
63	Alison	Elvis Costello	United Kingdom	1977	16
64	Love Song	Simple Minds	United Kingdom	1981	36
65	Temptation	New Order	United Kingdom	1982	
66	Imagine	John Lennon	United Kingdom	1971	31
67	The Love Cats	The Cure	United Kingdom	1983	
68	True Faith	New Order	United Kingdom	1987	
69	Nothing Compares 2 U	Sinéad O'Connor	Ireland	1990	
70	Wise Up! Sucker	Pop Will Eat Itself	United Kingdom	1989	
71	Say Goodbye	Hunters & Collectors	Australia	1986	97
72	In Between Days	The Cure	United Kingdom	1985	
73	I Want You	Elvis Costello & the Attractions	United Kingdom	1986	58
74	Freak Scene	Dinosaur Jr.	United States	1988	
75	Forbidden Colours	David Sylvian and Ryuichi Sakamoto	United Kingdom/Japan	1983	60
76	God Is a Bullet	Concrete Blonde	United States	1989	
77	Sympathy for the Devil	The Rolling Stones	United Kingdom	1968	63
78	Fall on Me	R.E.M.	United States	1986	
79	Once in a Lifetime	Talking Heads	United States	1981	
80	Into the Groove	Madonna	United States	1985	
81	Street Tuff	Rebel MC and Double Trouble	United Kingdom	1989	
82	Levi Stubbs' Tears	Billy Bragg	United Kingdom	1986	
83	All Along the Watchtower	The Jimi Hendrix Experience	United States	1968	49
84	Atmosphere	Joy Division	United Kingdom	1980	
85	Bye Bye Pride	The Go-Betweens	Australia	1987	89
86	Eternally Yours	Laughing Clowns	Australia	1984	
87	Add It Up	Violent Femmes	United States	1983	
88	Love Shack	The B-52's	United States	1989	
89	Teen Age Riot	Sonic Youth	United States	1988	
90	Sexual Healing	Marvin Gaye	United States	1982	62
91	Say No Go	De La Soul	United States	1989	
92	Reptile	The Church	Australia	1988	
93	Trust	Tall Tales and True	Australia	1989	
94	This Is the Day	The The	United Kingdom	1983	
95	Comfortably Numb	Pink Floyd	United Kingdom	1979	
96	Happy Birthday	Concrete Blonde	United States	1989	
97	Roam	The B-52's	United States	1989	
98	Walk on the Wild Side	Lou Reed	United States	1972	77
99	Orange Crush	R.E.M.	United States	1988	
100	Just Can't Get Enough	Depeche Mode	United Kingdom	1981	

== Statistics ==
=== Artists with multiple entries ===
#	Artist	Tracks
7	The Cure	11, 19, 23, 25, 43, 67, 72
6	Peter Hook (Note: Twice with Joy Division (1, 84), four times with New Order (5, 21, 65, 68))	1, 5, 21, 65, 68, 84
6	Stephen Morris	1, 5, 21, 65, 68, 84
6	Bernard Sumner	1, 5, 21, 65, 68, 84
4	Hunters & Collectors	2, 26, 32, 71
4	The Smiths	3, 7, 44, 53
4	New Order	5, 21, 65, 68
4	R.E.M.	9, 46, 78, 99
3	The B-52's	8, 88, 97
3	The Church	14, 57, 92
3	Pixies	18, 34, 55
3	Billy Bragg	58, 59, 82
2	Joy Division	1, 84
2	The The	4, 95
2	The Stone Roses	6, 51
2	Sinéad O'Connor	13, 69
2	The Go-Betweens	27, 85
2	Nick Cave (Note: Once with The Boys Next Door (15), and once with Nick Cave and the Bad Seeds (60))	15, 60
2	Pink Floyd	35, 95
2	Prince	37, 39
2	Violent Femmes	41, 87
2	The Doors	52, 62
2	Elvis Costello	63, 73
2	Concrete Blonde	76, 96

=== Countries represented ===
Country	#
United States	48
United Kingdom	31
Australia	16
Ireland	2
Sweden	2
Japan	1
Iceland	1
Italy	1

=== Songs by Decade ===
Decade	#
1960s	4
1970s	16
1980s	79
1990s	1

=== Records ===
- The Cure's seven entries is a new record for most appearances in a single countdown.
- Billy Bragg is the first artist in Hottest 100 history to have back to back entries in a countdown. His songs "Waiting for the Great Leap Forwards" & "Greetings to the New Brunette" came in at #58 and #59 respectively.
- Five songs maintained their positions from the previous year's countdown.
- Black Box is the first Italian artist to ever make it into the Hottest 100.

== See also ==
- 1990 in music
