= Hot 100 (disambiguation) =

The Billboard Hot 100 is a U.S. weekly music chart.

Hot 100 may also refer to:

== Record charts ==
- The Argentina Hot 100
- The Brasil Hot 100
- The Canadian Hot 100
- Eurochart Hot 100 Singles
- The Japan Hot 100
- The Korea K-Pop Hot 100
- The Philippines Hot 100
- The Vietnam Hot 100

== Radio ==
=== Radio stations ===
- Hot 100 FM, Darwin, Australia
- WALY (FM), Altoona, Pennsylvania, formerly branded as Hot 100

=== Radio programs ===
- 4ZZZ Hot 100, an annual Australian music listener poll
- Hot 100 (Japan FM League)

== Other uses ==
- Phillips' Hot 100, a hundred-proof (50% ABV), cinnamon-flavored schnapps produced by the Phillips Distilling Company
- Maxim Hot 100, Maxim magazine's annual list that features the 100 hottest women of the year

== See also ==
- The Triple J Hottest 100, an annual Australian music listener poll
