= Sonic Porno =

Australian alternative rock band

- Origin: Queensland, Australia
- Genre: Alternative Rock
- Years active: 2005–present
- Label: Alien Punk Records
- Members: Tone Constandi; Heyden Wilson; Mark Wilkinson
- Past members: Joel Sonic; Dave Traves; James West; Rob Squelch
- Website: Official website

Sonic Porno are an alternative rock band from Queensland, Australia. Formed in Brisbane, Queensland in 2005 by vocalist and guitarist Tone Sonic as a two-piece grunge band, the band have evolved into an energetic and hard-working act. The band are currently signed to Alien Punk Records.

== History ==
=== Formation and early work ===
The band formed in Brisbane as a two-piece grunge act, and released their first E.P. titled Grunge Is Not Dead in late 2006, while building their fanbase up through constant touring and appearances. The band also featured on Fuze TV, Alive in Brisbane and Tattu TV during this time as well as on the Global Warming tour. Sonic Porno were also the house band at "Bar Burlesque" in 2006 and performed at the Alive in Oz festival. Grunge Is Not Dead also peaked at No. 2 in the 4ZzZ album charts in January, 2007.

=== Life After Death (2007–2008) ===
The band toured continuously throughout 2007 while preparing to record their second EP, Life After Death. The album was released in October, 2007 to rave reviews. The band also supported The Disables and Mouthguard amongst other bands, and in 2008 supported Magic Dirt on their Australian tour. Sonic Porno co-headlined the 'Cruelty Free Festival' in Sydney, Australia in November, 2008 as well as embarking on their own 'Grungefest East Coast Festival Tour'. Sonic Porno were also the house band at the Clarence Corner Hotel in Brisbane throughout 2007 and also headlined the Bands by the Bay Festival in 2007. Life After Death peaked at No. 13 in the 4ZZZ album charts in October, 2007.

=== Live & Violent and Revolution (2009) ===
Sonic Porno released their first live album titled Live & Violent towards the end of 2008. The album was recorded live during a performance in Brisbane and successfully captured the emotion and energy of a Sonic Porno show. The band's fourth release, the EP Revolution was released in June, 2009. The EP marked a change in direction for the band, both in line-up and musical style. For the recording of this album, a new drummer, Heyden Wilson, joined the band, as did a second guitarist Dave Traves. The album toned down the raw grunge sound as heard on previous recordings, and instead focused on a more advanced, polished sound, while still retaining grunge influences. The added dynamics of a new guitarist enhanced the sound of the album and gave it more of a stoner rock feel. The EP peaked at No. 8 in the 4ZzZ album charts. In support of the release of the album, Sonic Porno embarked on a nationwide Australian tour, including multiple dates in Sydney, as well as stops in other Australian cities. Traves started a new endeavour; Traves Effects- and began releasing handmade guitar effects pedals throughout Australia.

The Revolution album which, it was felt by Tone Sonic in an interview on 4ZZZ in 2010, was never allotted the blanket promotion that it deserved, and with the new line-up producing, it was remixed and remastered in late 2010 and released officially through online retailers in January 2011.

== Members ==
- Tone Sonic—vocals
- Heyden Wilson—drums
- Dave Traves-guitar

== Discography ==
=== Singles ===
- "Just Like You"
- "Your Eyes"
- "Eleven"
- "Jager and Sex"
- "Charlie Sheen"

=== Albums ===
- Grunge Is Not Dead – Alien Punk (SPCD01) (13 June 2006)
- Life After Death – Alien Punk (SPCD02) (9 October 2007)
- Live & Violent – Alien Punk (2008)
- Revolution – Alien Punk (June, 2009 and January 2011 remastered/remixed)
- Flange Magnet – Alien Punk (September, 2011)

=== Official videos ===
- Jager & Sex – https://www.youtube.com/user/sonicporno?feature=mhee#p/a/f/0/D-GjN7Zkujw
- Think of You – https://www.youtube.com/user/sonicporno?feature=mhee#p/u/4/nFMxm-8k2pY
- Your Eyes - Live on Briz 31 TV – https://www.youtube.com/user/sonicporno?feature=mhee#p/u/3/GDF4JIyzRCM
