= Triple J's Hot 100 of 1989 =

Australian radio station music survey

1989 Triple J Hottest 100

Countdown details
- Date of countdown: 5 March 1989

Countdown highlights
- Winning song: Joy Division "Love Will Tear Us Apart"
- Most entries: Hunters & Collectors; The Smiths; The Cure; Elvis Costello (4 tracks)

Chronology
← Previous —	Next → 1990

The 1989 Triple J Hottest 100, also known as the 1989 Hot 100, was held on 5 March 1989. It was the first yearly poll of the most popular songs of all time, according to listeners of the Australian radio station Triple J. From 1989 to 1991, listeners could vote for songs released in any year.

== Full list ==
Note: Australian artists

#	Song	Artist	Country of origin	Year of release
1	Love Will Tear Us Apart	Joy Division	United Kingdom	1980
2	Throw Your Arms Around Me	Hunters & Collectors	Australia	1984
3	Uncertain Smile	The The	United Kingdom	1983
4	That's Entertainment	The Jam	United Kingdom	1980
5	Blue Monday	New Order	United Kingdom	1983
6	Holiday in Cambodia	Dead Kennedys	United States	1980
7	How Soon Is Now?	The Smiths	United Kingdom	1984
8	Talking to a Stranger	Hunters & Collectors	Australia	1982
9	Birthday	The Sugarcubes	Iceland	1987
10	A Forest	The Cure	United Kingdom	1980
11	Cattle and Cane	The Go-Betweens	Australia	1983
12	Shivers	The Boys Next Door	Australia	1979
13	This Charming Man	The Smiths	United Kingdom	1983
14	Rock Lobster	The B-52's	United States	1978
15	Song to the Siren	This Mortal Coil	United Kingdom	1983
16	Alison	Elvis Costello	United Kingdom	1977
17	Anarchy in the U.K.	Sex Pistols	United Kingdom	1976
18	London Calling	The Clash	United Kingdom	1979
19	Primary	The Cure	United Kingdom	1981
20	Waiting for the Great Leap Forwards	Billy Bragg	United Kingdom	1988
21	Respect	Aretha Franklin	United States	1967
22	It's the End of the World as We Know It (And I Feel Fine)	R.E.M.	United States	1987
23	Aloha Steve and Danno	Radio Birdman	Australia	1978
24	Kiss	Art of Noise featuring Tom Jones	United Kingdom	1988
25	Average Inadequacy	Machinations	Australia	1981
26	Another Girl, Another Planet	The Only Ones	United Kingdom	1978
27	Bigmouth Strikes Again	The Smiths	United Kingdom	1986
28	Know Your Product	The Saints	Australia	1978
29	Boys Don't Cry	The Cure	United Kingdom	1979
30	Stairway to Heaven	Led Zeppelin	United Kingdom	1971
31	Imagine	John Lennon	United Kingdom	1971
32	Psycho Killer	Talking Heads	United States	1977
33	Wish You Were Here	Pink Floyd	United Kingdom	1975
34	Kiss	Prince & the Revolution	United States	1986
35	She Sells Sanctuary	The Cult	United Kingdom	1985
36	Love Song	Simple Minds	United Kingdom	1981
37	Sign o' the Times	Prince	United States	1987
38	Greetings to the New Brunette	Billy Bragg	United Kingdom	1986
39	"Heroes"	David Bowie	United Kingdom	1977
40	L.A. Woman	The Doors	United States	1971
41	Troy	Sinéad O'Connor	Ireland	1987
42	The Unguarded Moment	The Church	Australia	1981
43	Wuthering Heights	Kate Bush	United Kingdom	1978
44	Smash It Up	The Damned	United Kingdom	1979
45	The One I Love	R.E.M.	United States	1987
46	Blister in the Sun	Violent Femmes	United States	1983
47	Lust for Life	Iggy Pop	United States	1977
48	Orinoco Flow	Enya	Ireland	1988
49	All Along the Watchtower	The Jimi Hendrix Experience	United States	1968
50	The End	The Doors	United States	1967
51	(I'm) Stranded	The Saints	Australia	1976
52	Teardrops	Womack & Womack	United States	1988
53	God Save the Queen	Sex Pistols	United Kingdom	1977
54	The Cutter	Echo & the Bunnymen	United Kingdom	1983
55	Marquee Moon	Television	United States	1977
56	Alone with You	Sunnyboys	Australia	1981
57	Wedding Cake Island	Midnight Oil	Australia	1980
58	I Want You	Elvis Costello & the Attractions	United Kingdom	1986
59	Moments in Love	Art of Noise	United Kingdom	1983
60	Forbidden Colours	David Sylvian and Ryuichi Sakamoto	United Kingdom/Japan	1983
61	Buffalo Stance	Neneh Cherry	Sweden	1988
62	Sexual Healing	Marvin Gaye	United States	1982
63	Sympathy for the Devil	The Rolling Stones	United Kingdom	1968
64	There Is a Light That Never Goes Out	The Smiths	United Kingdom	1986
65	Pretty Vacant	Sex Pistols	United Kingdom	1977
66	Close to Me	The Cure	United Kingdom	1985
67	Bizarre Love Triangle	New Order	United Kingdom	1986
68	Wide Open Road	The Triffids	Australia	1986
69	A Day in the Life	The Beatles	United Kingdom	1967
70	Deanna	Nick Cave & the Bad Seeds	Australia	1988
71	Pump It Up	Elvis Costello & the Attractions	United Kingdom	1978
72	Bachelor Kisses	The Go-Betweens	Australia	1984
73	Watching the Detectives	Elvis Costello	United Kingdom	1977
74	Duel	Propaganda	Germany	1985
75	Going Underground	The Jam	United Kingdom	1980
76	Layla	Derek & the Dominos	United States	1970
77	Walk on the Wild Side	Lou Reed	United States	1972
78	Ghost Ships	The Saints	Australia	1984
79	My Island Home	Warumpi Band	Australia	1987
80	Blue Bell Knoll	Cocteau Twins	United Kingdom	1988
81	Making Plans for Nigel	XTC	United Kingdom	1979
82	Golden Brown	The Stranglers	United Kingdom	1981
83	Betty's Worry or the Slab	Hunters & Collectors	Australia	1984
84	Burning Down the House	Talking Heads	United States	1983
85	The Message	Grandmaster Flash & the Furious Five	United States	1982
86	Riders on the Storm	The Doors	United States	1971
87	Down in the Tube Station at Midnight	The Jam	United Kingdom	1978
88	Power and the Passion	Midnight Oil	Australia	1982
89	Bye Bye Pride	The Go-Betweens	Australia	1987
90	Eagle Rock	Daddy Cool	Australia	1971
91	Suspicious Minds	Elvis Presley	United States	1969
92	I Say a Little Prayer	Aretha Franklin	United States	1968
93	Slave Girl	Lime Spiders	Australia	1984
94	Heart of Glass	Blondie	United States	1978
95	Khe Sanh	Cold Chisel	Australia	1978
96	O Superman	Laurie Anderson	United States	1981
97	Say Goodbye	Hunters & Collectors	Australia	1986
98	Man Overboard	Do-Re-Mi	Australia	1985
99	The Cicada That Ate Five Dock	Outline	Australia	1980
100	The Mercy Seat	Nick Cave & the Bad Seeds	Australia	1988

== Statistics ==
=== Artists with multiple entries ===
#	Artist	Tracks
4	Hunters & Collectors	2, 8, 83, 97
4	The Smiths	7, 13, 27, 64
4	The Cure	10, 19, 29, 66
4	Elvis Costello	16, 58, 71, 73
3	Peter Hook (Note: Once with Joy Division (1), twice with New Order (5, 67))	1, 5, 67
3	Stephen Morris	1, 5, 67
3	Bernard Sumner	1, 5, 67
3	The Jam	4, 75, 87
3	The Go-Betweens	11, 72, 89
3	Nick Cave (Note: Once with The Boys Next Door (12), twice with Nick Cave and the Bad Seeds (70, 100))	12, 70, 100
3	Sex Pistols	17, 53, 63
3	The Saints	28, 51, 78
3	The Doors	40, 50, 86
2	New Order	5, 67
2	Billy Bragg	20, 38
2	Aretha Franklin	21, 92
2	R.E.M.	22, 45
2	Art of Noise	24, 59
2	John Lennon (Note: Once solo (31), and once with The Beatles (69))	31, 69
2	Talking Heads	32, 84
2	Prince	34, 37
2	Midnight Oil	57, 88
2	Nick Cave and the Bad Seeds	70, 100

=== Countries represented ===
Country	Count
United Kingdom	44
Australia	26
United States	25
Ireland	2
Germany	1
Iceland	1
Japan	1
Sweden	1

=== Songs by decade ===
Decade	Number of songs
1960s	7
1970s	32
1980s	61

== See also ==
- 1989 in music
