= Triple J Hottest 100 =

Australian annual music countdown

Triple J's Hottest 100
- Current: Triple J's Hottest 100 of 2025
- "The world's greatest music democracy"
- Awarded for: The year's top 100 songs as voted by listeners
- Date: Fourth Saturday in January
- Country: Australia
- Presented by: Triple J
- First award: 5 March 1989; 37 years ago
- Currently held by: Olivia Dean – "Man I Need" (2025)

Highlights
- Most wins: Bernard Fanning (4 wins) (Note: Three times with Powderfinger in 1999, 2000 and 2011 (Australian Albums); once as a solo artist in 2005)
- Website: Official website

Triple J's Hottest 100 is an annual music poll presented by the Australian youth radio station Triple J since 1989. Listeners are invited to vote for their favourite songs of the year in an online ballot conducted before the new year.

In its early years, the Hottest 100 was broadcast in March, then on various days in January and February. From 1998, it was consistently held on Australia Day (26 January), before moving to the fourth weekend of January starting in 2017. Generally the Hottest 200 (songs 200–101) is also held on this weekend.

The poll has grown from 500,000 votes in 2004 to a peak of over 3.2 million in 2019, and it has been referred to as "the world's greatest music democracy". British singer Olivia Dean's song "Man I Need" is the latest song to top the Hottest 100. Several special countdowns have also been held, like the Hottest 100 of the 2010s, and the Hottest 100 of Australian Songs to celebrate Triple J's 50th anniversary in 2025.

Since 2015, the countdown has raised more than $3.3 million for various Australian charities through donations and merchandise sales. ABC Music issued compilation CDs following each year's countdown until 2022. In 2023, the network launched Triple J Hottest, an internet radio station featuring a playlist of tracks from all previous Hottest 100 countdowns.

== History ==
=== 1988–1991: The Hot 100 ===
In 1988, Triple J producer Lawrie Zion had the idea to run a poll to determine his listeners' 100 favourite songs of all time. The idea was taken from Brisbane community radio station 4ZZZ, which developed the original Hot 100 in 1976. 4ZZZ themselves borrowed the idea from an Adelaide radio station and British magazine NME.

For the Hot 100, before Triple J had become a national broadcaster, Sydney listeners were required to write their 10 favourite tracks on the back of an envelope. Some entries were sent into the station written on a variety of items, including paintings, sculptures, and hand-rolled cannabis cigarettes. The results of the first poll were counted down on Sunday, 5 March 1989.

The station repeated the event the following year when it started broadcasting to other capital cities besides Sydney. In 1991, Triple J was forced to change the poll's name to Hottest 100 to avoid legal action with 4ZZZ.

In the poll's first two years (1989 and 1990), the winner was "Love Will Tear Us Apart" by Joy Division, while 1991's favourite song was "Smells Like Teen Spirit" by Nirvana, which had been released that year.

=== 1992–1995: The Hottest 100 ===
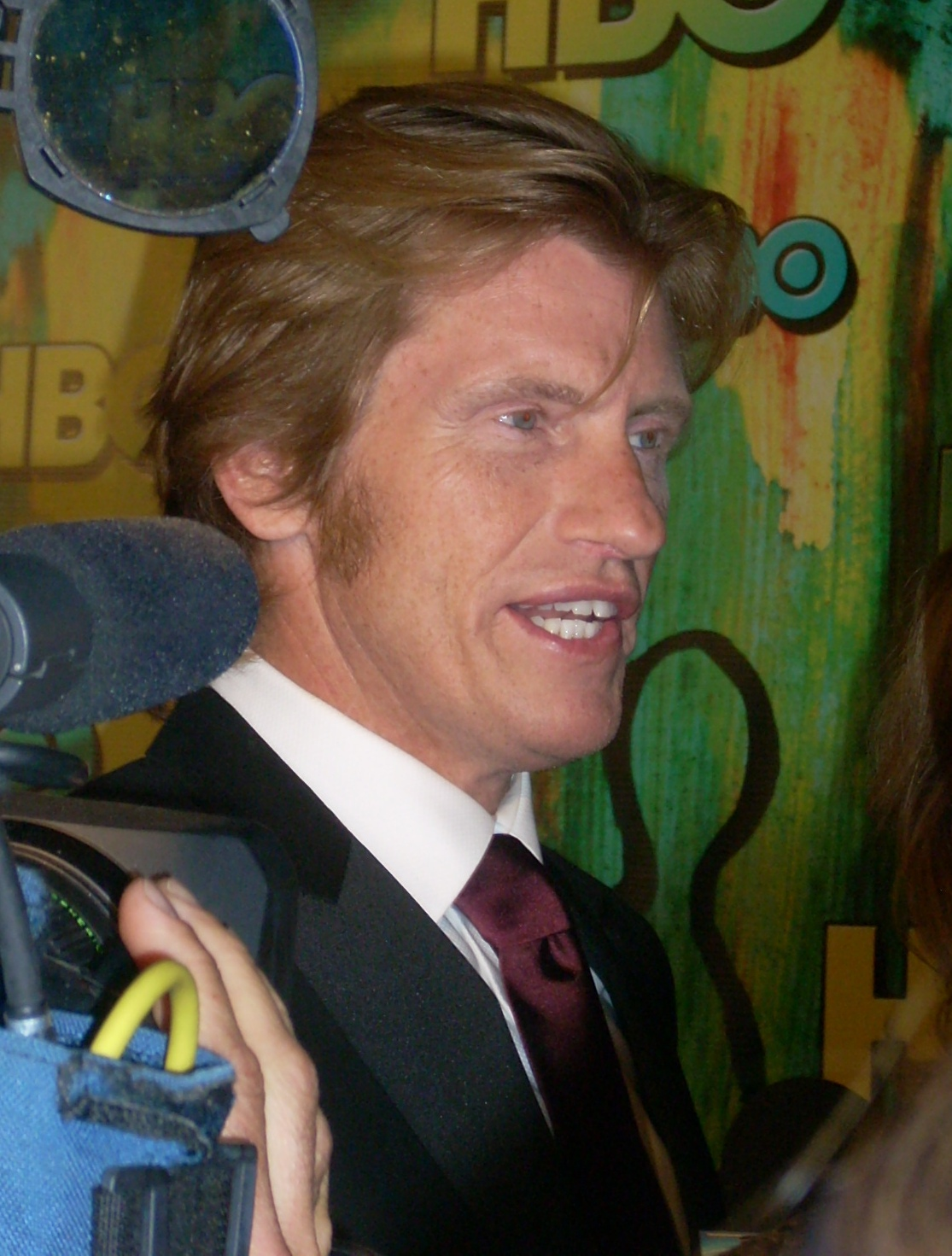
American comedian Denis Leary topped the first annual Hottest 100 in 1993

Realising that the poll's results were unlikely to significantly change from year to year, Triple J rested the Hottest 100 in 1992 and relaunched it as an annual poll the following year. The new system required listeners to vote for their favourite songs of that year. Denis Leary's comedy anthem "Asshole" was voted number one in 1993.

The inaugural Hottest 100 compilation CD, Triple J Hottest 100 (The Hottest Of The Hottest), was released by ABC Music in 1994.

=== 1996–2016: Rise in Australian music ===
In 1996, Spiderbait became the first Australian act to reach number one. Since 1999, Australian acts have made up the majority of the polls.

The first Hottest 100 DVD, Triple J Hottest 100: The Hottest Videos For 2002, was released in 2002. Queens of the Stone Age's "No One Knows" was voted into the top position in that year, while Grinspoon, Motor Ace, Darren Hanlon, Machine Translations and Ms Dynamite were other Hottest 100 artists featured on the release.

In 2003, Powderfinger became the first act to be featured three times within the top 10 of the countdown, with "(Baby I've Got You) On My Mind", "Sunsets" and "Love Your Way" being voted in at No. 4, No. 7, and No. 10, respectively.

After its beginnings as a write-in poll, the Hottest 100 progressed to phone-in voting, which then progressed to SMS and online voting. In 2003, only web votes through the Triple J website were accepted, with registration required and a limit of 10 votes applied. In 2004, the guidelines were expanded so that voters were entitled to 10 internet votes and 10 SMS votes.

In 2014, Chet Faker repeated Powderfinger's achievement from 2003 by placing three times in the top 10 positions. Faker reached the number one spot with "Talk Is Cheap" and the seventh and eighth positions respectively, with "Gold" and "1998". All three songs came from Faker's 2014 album Built on Glass. Chet Faker placed a total of four times in the entire poll, with a Like a Version cover of Sonia Dada's "You Don't Treat Me No Good" in the 22nd position. The 2014 Hottest 100 poll received a record of 2,099,707 million votes, cast by 258,762 voters from 188 countries.

==== 2015: Taylor Swift controversy ====
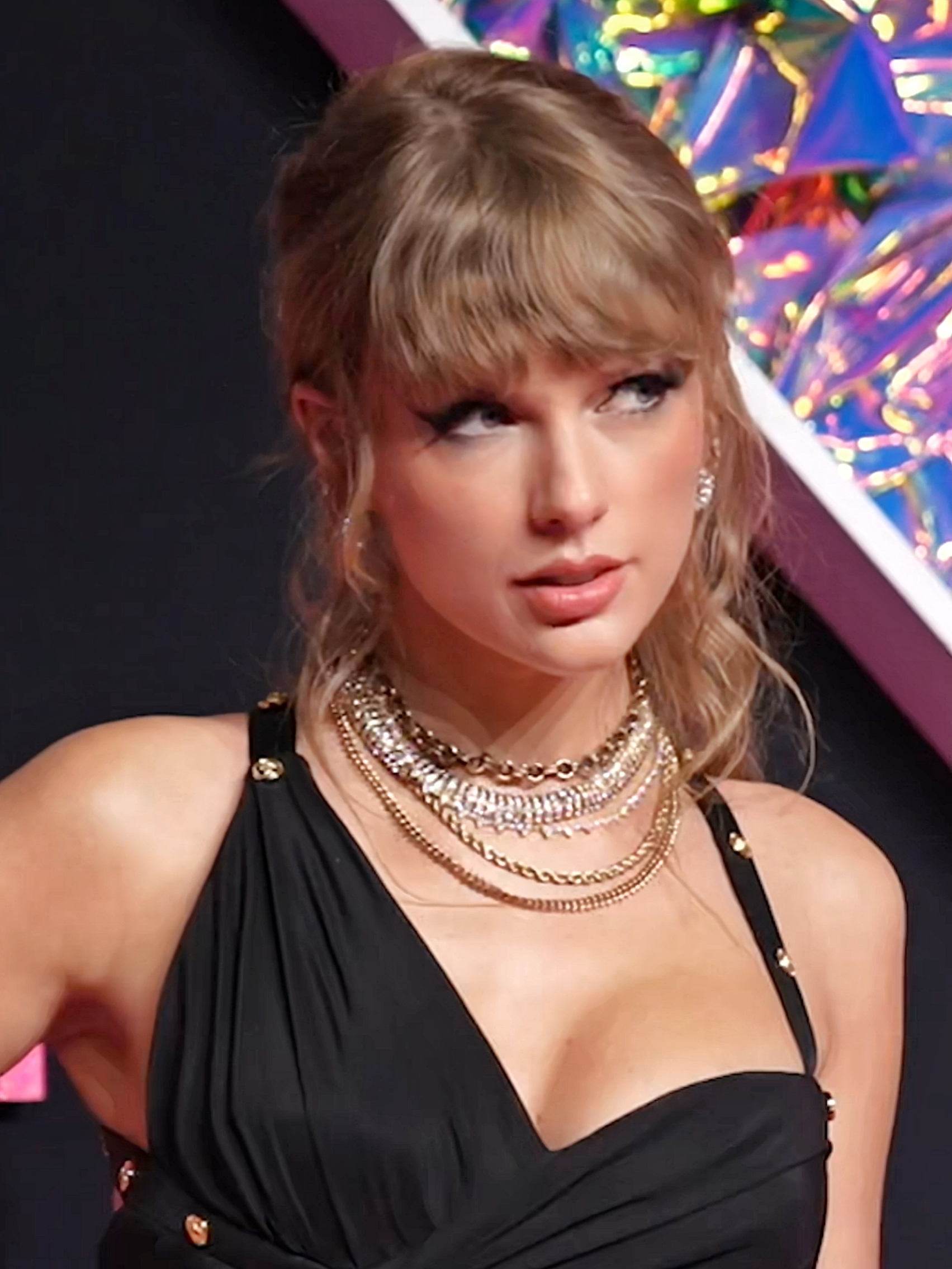
Taylor Swift's hit 2015 single "Shake It Off" was notably banned from that year's Hottest 100.

Following a 13 January 2015 article on BuzzFeed, the "#Tay4Hottest100" hashtag campaign began during the voting period for the Hottest 100 poll for 2014 to promote Taylor Swift's hit single "Shake It Off". According to those critical of the campaign, the Hottest 100 is reserved for non-mainstream artists who were "discovered or fostered by Triple J" and provides valuable exposure for artists in the outer circles of the music industry.

The campaign led to discussion about the broader cultural implications of the controversy generated by Swift. The Guardian's Elle Hunt wrote: "... the virulent response to #Tay4Hottest100 has revealed the persistence of a dichotomy I'd thought we'd thrown out long ago: that of high art versus low." Writing for The Conversation on 23 January 2015, Charles Darwin University academic Gemma Blackwood concluded:

The cultural and economic meanings attached to the celebrity-sign of "Taylor Swift" seems antithetical to Triple J's self-representation as a place for exciting new music, with a supposed focus on emerging Australian talent. This perhaps explains why Swift is excluded from the playlist when other "mainstream" American artists and chart toppers ... are still played on the station heavily: the alignment and transfer of values of what is considered "cool" and "hip" between the station and its chosen artists ... It raises the question: what responsibility does a national youth broadcaster have in the shaping and the adapting of young musical interests?

Station manager Chris Scaddan told the media that the Swift campaign was within the rules of the poll, later instructing Triple J employees not to comment to "media, friends, family" about the campaign, as "it will all become clear when we get to the countdown next Monday." The station said: "we don't comment on voting campaigns whilst Hottest 100 voting is open. It draws attention to them and may influence the results of the poll." Marketing website Mumbrella suggested on 20 January that a Facebook post by KFC incorporating the "#Tay4Hottest100" hashtag was against the Hottest 100 rules and could see Swift disqualified. The Guardian submitted a freedom of information request to the ABC in regard to the station's response to the campaign.

After journalist Peter Vincent reported that the Swift campaign had "swallowed" the Hottest 100 for 2014, citing research from the University of Queensland that showed that over 7,341 Hottest 100 posts in a 30-day period leading up to the poll results related to Swift, "Shake It Off" was eventually disqualified by the radio station in an announcement on 26 January 2015. The official announcement read: "it became pretty clear, pretty quick that a lot of people just wanted to prod some 'hipsters' for the lulz", acknowledging that the station "had a heap of fun" with the campaign, while also acknowledging Swift is "smart", "cool" and "successful". The song would have placed in 12th position if it had been allowed to compete.

On the inside cover of the Triple J Hottest 100 Volume 22 CD, bold capital initials spell out "TAYLOR SWIFT BAN".

=== 2017–present: Announcement of date change ===
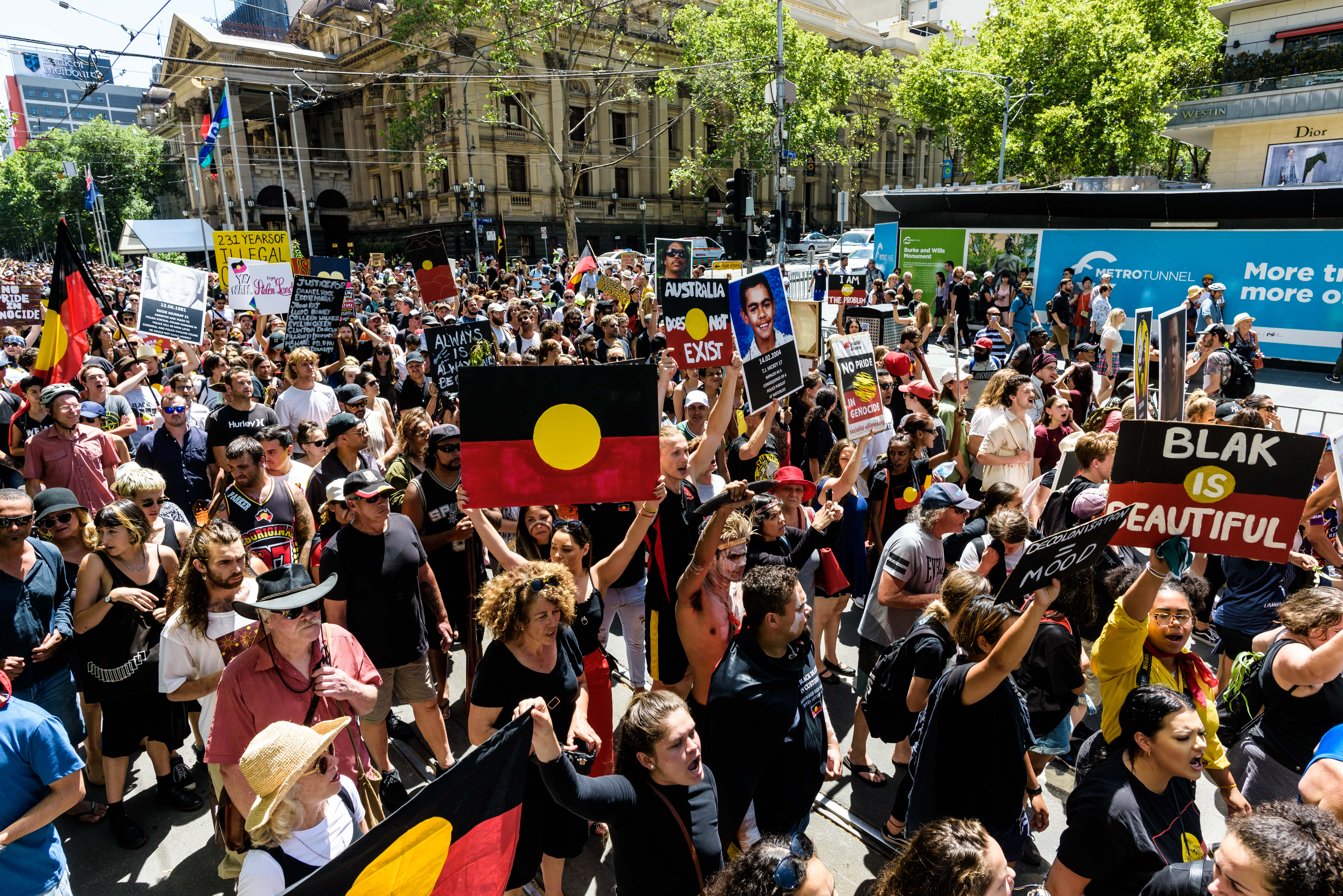
The Hottest 100 was moved from Australia Day from 2017, in response to growing controversy surrounding its marking of colonisation.

In mid-2016, support grew for a campaign calling on Triple J to change the date of the Hottest 100 due to ongoing debate about the meaning of the date of Australia Day to Indigenous Australians. Calls were led by Indigenous activists, with Australian hip-hop duo A.B. Original and their protest single "January 26" playing a particularly instrumental role in drawing support to the cause. Triple J responded to the campaign in September 2016, announcing a review over whether the date of the Hottest 100 should be changed.

The review of the date continued into 2017, including consultation with Reconciliation Australia, the National Congress of Australia's First Peoples, and the National Australia Day Council, while the 2016 Hottest 100 was held on Australia Day without change. In August 2017, Triple J launched a survey asking for public opinion on whether the date should be changed. 60% of participants voted in support of moving the date; 39% responded to not change it.

In 2017, Triple J announced that they would no longer hold the Hottest 100 on 26 January. Instead, the Hottest 100 would be held on the fourth weekend of January each year, beginning with the 2017 countdown on 27 January 2018.

Some organisations offered alternatives to Triple J's Hottest 100 in response to the date change. These include nationwide rock radio station Triple M broadcasting an Ozzest 100 countdown of only Australian songs on 26 January, and Senator Cory Bernardi's Australian Conservatives publishing an AC100 playlist of Australian music on Spotify.

== Top tens and summaries ==
Note: All-time countdowns

List of Triple J's Hottest 100 countdowns by year, with top tens and highlights
Year	Top ten	Highlights
All time (1989)	1. Joy Division – "Love Will Tear Us Apart" (1980); 2. Hunters & Collectors – "Throw Your Arms Around Me" (1984); 3. The The – "Uncertain Smile" (1983); 4. The Jam – "That's Entertainment" (1980); 5. New Order – "Blue Monday" (1983); 6. Dead Kennedys – "Holiday in Cambodia" (1980); 7. The Smiths – "How Soon Is Now?" (1985); 8. Hunters & Collectors – "Talking to a Stranger" (1982); 9. The Sugarcubes – "Birthday" (1987); 10. The Cure – "A Forest" (1980)	The first of the original series of Hottest 100s, in which songs could be selected from any year.; The list included two versions of the song "Kiss". The original by Prince at No. 34 and Art of Noise and Tom Jones's cover at No. 24.; Elvis Costello, The Cure, Hunters & Collectors and The Smiths scored four tracks each in the countdown.
All time (1990)	1. Joy Division – "Love Will Tear Us Apart" (1980); 2. Hunters & Collectors – "Throw Your Arms Around Me" (1984); 3. The Smiths – "How Soon Is Now?" (1985); 4. The The – "Uncertain Smile" (1983); 5. New Order – "Blue Monday" (1983); 6. The Stone Roses – "Fools Gold" (1989); 7. The Smiths – "This Charming Man" (1983); 8. The B-52's – "Rock Lobster" (1979); 9. R.E.M. – "It's the End of the World as We Know It (And I Feel Fine)" (1987); 10. The Jam – "That's Entertainment" (1980)	The second of the original series of Hottest 100s which allowed choices from any year.; The Cure scored seven songs in the countdown.
All time (1991)	1. Nirvana – "Smells Like Teen Spirit" (1991); 2. Joy Division – "Love Will Tear Us Apart" (1980); 3. Nirvana – "Lithium" (1991); 4. Hunters & Collectors – "Throw Your Arms Around Me" (1984); 5. Andy Prieboy – "Tomorrow Wendy" (1990); 6. The Smiths – "How Soon Is Now?" (1985); 7. The Stone Roses – "Fools Gold" (1989); 8. The Cure – "A Forest" (1980); 9. Violent Femmes – "Blister in the Sun" (1983); 10. New Order – "Blue Monday" (1983)	The third of the original series of Hottest 100s which allowed choices from any year.; The Cure scored nine tracks in the countdown. Although not a part of the official countdowns, this record remains unbroken as of 2024. The closest artists to approach the record are Charli XCX and Billie Eilish who both had eight tracks in the 2024 countdown.
1992	No Hottest 100 Held	
1993	1. Denis Leary – "Asshole"; 2. Radiohead – "Creep"; 3. The Cranberries – "Linger"; 4. Blind Melon – "No Rain"; 5. The Breeders – "Cannonball"; 6. Rage Against the Machine – "Killing in the Name"; 7. U2 – "Lemon"; 8. Pearl Jam – "Go"; 9. The Cruel Sea – "The Honeymoon Is Over"; 10. Atomic Swing – "Stone Me Into the Groove"	Return after list hiatus in 1992.; The new format only allowed songs released as singles within the previous calendar year.; The Cruel Sea and Michael Stipe (twice with R.E.M.) scored three tracks in the countdown.
1994	1. The Cranberries – "Zombie"; 2. Nine Inch Nails – "Closer"; 3. The Offspring – "Self Esteem"; 4. The Offspring – "Come Out and Play"; 5. Silverchair – "Tomorrow"; 6. Veruca Salt – "Seether"; 7. Nirvana – "About a Girl"; 8. Max Sharam – "Coma"; 9. Tom Jones – "If I Only Knew"; 10. Severed Heads – "Dead Eyes Opened"	Soundgarden scored four tracks in the countdown. Setting the record for most appearances in a single countdown.; "Zombie" becomes the first No. 1 song with a female vocalist.; The Offspring scored back to back tracks at positions No. 3 and 4; the first time in an official countdown that a band scored two songs in the top 5.
1995	1. Oasis – "Wonderwall"; 2. The Smashing Pumpkins – "Bullet with Butterfly Wings"; 3. Coolio featuring L.V. – "Gangsta's Paradise"; 4. The Presidents of the United States of America – "Kitty"; 5. Björk – "It's Oh So Quiet"; 6. Everclear – "Heroin Girl"; 7. Custard – "Apartment"; 8. Nick Cave and the Bad Seeds and Kylie Minogue – "Where the Wild Roses Grow"; 9. TISM – "(He'll Never Be An) Ol' Man River"; 10. TISM – "Greg! The Stop Sign!!"	Alanis Morissette, Green Day, Live, Red Hot Chili Peppers, TISM and You Am I scored three tracks each in the countdown.; Alanis Morissette scored three songs without a single song of hers being played on Triple J that year.; Grinspoon are the first Triple J Unearthed artist to appear in the Hottest 100.; At No. 5, Björk's cover of "It's Oh So Quiet" becomes the highest ranked cover version in a Hottest 100 countdown.
1996	1. Spiderbait – "Buy Me a Pony"; 2. Tool – "Stinkfist"; 3. Ben Folds Five – "Underground"; 4. Butthole Surfers – "Pepper"; 5. Bush – "Glycerine"; 6. Powderfinger – "Pick You Up"; 7. The Prodigy – "Breathe"; 8. Allen Ginsberg – "Ballad of the Skeletons"; 9. Weezer – "El Scorcho"; 10. Babybird – "You're Gorgeous"	The first time an Australian track had been voted No. 1.; Bush, Pearl Jam, Powderfinger and The Smashing Pumpkins scored three tracks each in the countdown.
1997	1. The Whitlams – "No Aphrodisiac"; 2. Blur – "Song 2"; 3. Chumbawamba – "Tubthumping"; 4. The Verve – "Bitter Sweet Symphony"; 5. Pauline Pantsdown – "Back Door Man"; 6. Blink-182 – "Dammit"; 7. Radiohead – "Paranoid Android"; 8. Marilyn Manson – "The Beautiful People"; 9. Radiohead – "Karma Police"; 10. Jebediah – "Leaving Home"	Former Prime Minister Gough Whitlam announced the winning song, sung by "his eponym", The Whitlams.; Pauline Pantsdown's track "Back Door Man", which was banned by a court injunction from Pauline Hanson only 11 days after being first broadcast by the station, was voted No. 5.; Arkarna, Bloodhound Gang, Everclear, Faith No More, Grinspoon, Jebediah, The Living End, Radiohead, Silverchair, The Verve, The Whitlams and Ween scored two tracks each in the countdown.; 1997 had the highest number of different artists represented of any Hottest 100.
All Time (1998)	1. Nirvana – "Smells Like Teen Spirit" (1991); 2. Hunters & Collectors – "Throw Your Arms Around Me" (1984); 3. Pearl Jam – "Alive" (1991); 4. Jeff Buckley – "Last Goodbye" (1994); 5. Radiohead – "Creep" (1992); 6. Led Zeppelin – "Stairway to Heaven" (1971); 7. Metallica – "One" (1988); 8. Queen – "Bohemian Rhapsody" (1975); 9. Metallica – "Enter Sandman" (1991); 10. Pearl Jam – "Black" (1991)	Compiled and played in August 1998.; Hosted by Robbie Buck, who played the wrong song by Led Zeppelin for No. 6, which was supposed to be "Stairway to Heaven".; Grinspoon's "Just Ace", and the Ben Folds Five's "Brick" are the only songs to chart in an All Time countdown before an official yearly countdown.; The Cure scored five tracks in the countdown.
1998	1. The Offspring – "Pretty Fly (For a White Guy)"; 2. Ben Lee – "Cigarettes Will Kill You"; 3. Custard – "Girls Like That (Don't Go For Guys Like Us)"; 4. Hole – "Celebrity Skin"; 5. KoЯn – "Got the Life"; 6. Regurgitator – "! (The Song Formerly Known As)"; 7. Jebediah – "Harpoon"; 8. Powderfinger – "The Day You Come"; 9. You Am I – "Heavy Heart"; 10. The Living End – "Save the Day"	Regurgitator scored four tracks in the countdown; equaling the record for most appearances in a single countdown set by Soundgarden in 1994; Regurgitator frontman Quan Yeomans was involved with six tracks (including three in succession from No. 26 to No. 28): four with Regurgitator and twice with Happyland.; The list included two versions of the song Harpoon: the original by Jebediah at No. 7 and Something for Kate's cover at No. 85.
1999	1. Powderfinger – "These Days"; 2. Killing Heidi – "Weir"; 3. The Tenants – "You Shit Me to Tears"; 4. Fatboy Slim – "Praise You"; 5. Placebo – "Every You Every Me"; 6. Bloodhound Gang – "The Bad Touch"; 7. Rage Against the Machine – "Guerrilla Radio"; 8. Limp Bizkit – "Nookie"; 9. Pearl Jam – "Last Kiss"; 10. Red Hot Chili Peppers – "Scar Tissue"	Powderfinger and Silverchair scored four tracks each in the countdown, equaling the record for most appearances in a single countdown set by Soundgarden in 1994 and Regurgitator in 1998.; The 1999 countdown held the record for the most Australian artists in a countdown, with 52. This record was equaled in the 2007 countdown, and later broken in the 2014 countdown.; Killing Heidi set the record for the highest ranking song by an Unearthed artist.
2000	1. Powderfinger – "My Happiness"; 2. U2 – "Beautiful Day"; 3. Powderfinger – "My Kind of Scene"; 4. Wheatus – "Teenage Dirtbag"; 5. Coldplay – "Yellow"; 6. The Avalanches – "Frontier Psychiatrist"; 7. Red Hot Chili Peppers – "Californication"; 8. Foo Fighters – "Generator"; 9. Paul Kelly – "Every Fucking City"; 10. The Dandy Warhols – "Bohemian Like You"	Rage Against the Machine scored three tracks in the countdown.; Powderfinger became the first artist to have two Hottest 100 No. 1 tracks, in 1999 and 2000.; Powderfinger became the second band to achieve two songs in the top five, the first Australian band to do so.
2001	1. Alex Lloyd – "Amazing"; 2. Something for Kate – "Monsters"; 3. System of a Down – "Chop Suey!"; 4. Basement Jaxx – "Where's Your Head At"; 5. John Butler Trio – "Betterman"; 6. Alien Ant Farm – "Smooth Criminal"; 7. Weezer – "Island in the Sun"; 8. The Avalanches – "Since I Left You"; 9. Gorillaz featuring Del tha Funkee Homosapien – "Clint Eastwood"; 10. Cake – "Short Skirt/Long Jacket"	Eskimo Joe, Muse, Something for Kate and The Strokes scored three tracks each in the countdown.
2002	1. Queens of the Stone Age – "No One Knows"; 2. Grinspoon – "Chemical Heart"; 3. The Waifs – "London Still"; 4. 1200 Techniques – "Karma"; 5. The Vines – "Get Free"; 6. Machine Gun Fellatio – "Pussy Town"; 7. Eminem – "Lose Yourself"; 8. Machine Gun Fellatio – "Rollercoaster"; 9. Red Hot Chili Peppers – "By the Way"; 10. Silverchair – "The Greatest View"	Queens of the Stone Age and Silverchair scored five tracks each in the countdown. Setting the record for most appearances in a single countdown.; Dave Grohl was involved with ten tracks (including three in succession from No. 11 to No. 13): five with Queens of the Stone Age, four with the Foo Fighters, and one with Nirvana.; Grinspoon equal Killing Heidi's record of the Highest placing of a Triple J Unearthed artist at No. 2.; Mark Lanegan became the oldest person to win the Hottest 100. He was 42 when it was announced that "No One Knows" won the countdown.; 2002 had the lowest number of different artists represented of any Hottest 100.
2003	1. Jet – "Are You Gonna Be My Girl"; 2. OutKast – "Hey Ya!"; 3. The White Stripes – "Seven Nation Army"; 4. Powderfinger – "(Baby I've Got You) On My Mind"; 5. Coldplay – "Clocks (Röyksopp Trembling Heart Mix)"; 6. The Cat Empire – "Hello"; 7. Powderfinger – "Sunsets"; 8. John Butler Trio – "Zebra"; 9. Hilltop Hoods – "The Nosebleed Section"; 10. Powderfinger – "Love Your Way"	Powderfinger and The White Stripes scored five tracks each in the countdown, equaling the record for most appearances in a single countdown set by Queens of the Stone Age and Silverchair in the previous year; Powderfinger became the first band to achieve three tracks in the top ten.
2004	1. Franz Ferdinand – "Take Me Out"; 2. Missy Higgins – "Scar"; 3. Eskimo Joe – "From the Sea"; 4. The Killers – "Somebody Told Me"; 5. Spiderbait – "Black Betty"; 6. Missy Higgins – "Ten Days"; 7. John Butler Trio – "Something's Gotta Give"; 8. Little Birdy – "Beautiful to Me"; 9. Powderfinger – "Bless My Soul"; 10. The White Stripes – "Jolene (Live Under Blackpool Lights)"	John Butler Trio and the Scissor Sisters scored four tracks each in the countdown.; The list included two versions of the song "Take Me Out": the original by Franz Ferdinand at No. 1 and Scissor Sisters' cover at No. 44.; At No. 5, Spiderbait's cover of "Black Betty" ties with Björk's cover of "It's Oh So Quiet" as the highest ranked cover version in a Hottest 100 countdown.; Missy Higgins's "Scar" is the equal highest ranking song by an Unearthed artist. It is tied with Killing Heidi in 1999 and Grinspoon in 2002.
2005	1. Bernard Fanning – "Wish You Well"; 2. Ben Lee – "Catch My Disease"; 3. Gorillaz featuring De La Soul – "Feel Good Inc."; 4. Foo Fighters – "Best of You"; 5. Gorillaz featuring Shaun Ryder – "Dare"; 6. Wolfmother – "Mind's Eye"; 7. The White Stripes – "My Doorbell"; 8. End of Fashion – "O Yeah"; 9. Wolfmother – "Joker & the Thief"; 10. Franz Ferdinand – "Do You Want To"	Wolfmother scored six tracks in the countdown, at that point setting the record for most appearances in a single countdown (equaled by Spacey Jane in 2022).; Gorillaz became the third band to place twice in the Top 5.; Bernard Fanning achieves a Hottest 100 No. 1 for the third time (the only artist to do so to date), including twice with Powderfinger in 1999 and 2000.; Ben Lee achieves No. 2 for the second time.
2006	1. Augie March – "One Crowded Hour"; 2. Eskimo Joe – "Black Fingernails, Red Wine"; 3. Hilltop Hoods – "The Hard Road"; 4. The Killers – "When You Were Young"; 5. Scissor Sisters – "I Don't Feel Like Dancin'"; 6. Gnarls Barkley – "Crazy"; 7. Snow Patrol – "Chasing Cars"; 8. Gotye – "Hearts a Mess"; 9. Muse – "Starlight"; 10. The Grates – "19-20-20"	Hilltop Hoods scored five tracks in the countdown.; The Living End featured in the Hottest 100 for the tenth consecutive year.
2007	1. Muse – "Knights of Cydonia"; 2. Silverchair – "Straight Lines"; 3. Kings of Leon – "On Call"; 4. John Butler Trio – "Better Than"; 5. Faker – "This Heart Attack"; 6. Foo Fighters – "The Pretender"; 7. Daft Punk – "Harder, Better, Faster, Stronger (Alive 2007)"; 8. Cold War Kids – "Hang Me Up to Dry"; 9. Soko – "I'll Kill Her"; 10. The Panics – "Don't Fight It"	Bloc Party, Harry James Angus, John Butler Trio, Josh Pyke, Kings of Leon and Silverchair scored three tracks each in the countdown.; 2007 was the closest Hottest 100 ever, with Muse winning by only 14 votes.
2008	1. Kings of Leon – "Sex on Fire"; 2. MGMT – "Electric Feel"; 3. Kings of Leon – "Use Somebody"; 4. Empire of the Sun – "Walking on a Dream"; 5. MGMT – "Kids"; 6. The Presets – "Talk Like That"; 7. Pez featuring 360 and Hailey Cramer – "The Festival Song"; 8. The Presets – "This Boy's in Love"; 9. The Ting Tings – "That's Not My Name"; 10. Drapht – "Jimmy Recard"	Kings of Leon, Nick Littlemore and Vampire Weekend scored four tracks each in the countdown; Both Kings of Leon and MGMT placed twice in the Top 5, the fourth and fifth artists to do so. This is also the first time where two separate artists appeared twice in the Top 5.; The 2008 countdown marked the first time since 1995 that no Australian artist has featured in the Top 3 songs.
All Time (2009)	1. Nirvana – "Smells Like Teen Spirit" (1991); 2. Rage Against the Machine – "Killing in the Name" (1992); 3. Jeff Buckley – "Hallelujah" (1994); 4. Joy Division – "Love Will Tear Us Apart" (1980); 5. Radiohead – "Paranoid Android" (1997); 6. Queen – "Bohemian Rhapsody" (1975); 7. Jeff Buckley – "Last Goodbye" (1994); 8. Red Hot Chili Peppers – "Under the Bridge" (1991); 9. Foo Fighters – "Everlong" (1997); 10. Led Zeppelin – "Stairway to Heaven" (1971)	Voting was held in June 2009, results were broadcast from 7 to 12 July 2009.; Nirvana's "Smells Like Teen Spirit" was voted No. 1 for the third time in a row in the Hottest 100 of All Time (previous years 1991 and 1998).; Jeff Buckley and Radiohead scored four tracks each in the countdown.; Dave Grohl was involved with five tracks appearing three times with Nirvana, once with the Foo Fighters and once with Queens of the Stone Age.; Only two songs in the countdown featured a female lead vocalist: Elizabeth Fraser and Shara Nelson, both guest vocalists on songs by Massive Attack.; Radiohead swapped the No. 5 and No. 13 positions that they had held in the 1998 all time countdown with "Creep" and "Paranoid Android".
2009	1. Mumford & Sons – "Little Lion Man"; 2. Art vs. Science – "Parlez Vous Francais?"; 3. Hilltop Hoods – "Chase That Feeling"; 4. Phoenix – "Lisztomania"; 5. Bluejuice – "Broken Leg"; 6. La Roux – "Bulletproof"; 7. Lisa Mitchell – "Coin Laundry"; 8. Lily Allen – "Not Fair"; 9. Muse – "Uprising"; 10. Florence and the Machine – "Dog Days Are Over"	Florence and the Machine and Muse scored four tracks each in the countdown.; This is the first Hottest 100 not to feature an American artist in the Top 10.; Art vs. Science's "Parlez Vous Francais?" is the equal highest ranking song by an Unearthed artist. It tied with Killing Heidi in 1999, Grinspoon in 2002 and Missy Higgins in 2004.; The 2009 winner was leaked on 22 January by ABC Commercial.; Hilltop Hoods achieves No. 3 for the second time.
2010	1. Angus & Julia Stone – "Big Jet Plane"; 2. Little Red – "Rock It"; 3. Ou Est le Swimming Pool – "Dance the Way I Feel"; 4. Birds of Tokyo – "Plans"; 5. Boy & Bear – "Fall at Your Feet"; 6. Adrian Lux – "Teenage Crime"; 7. Cee-Lo Green – "Fuck You"; 8. The Wombats – "Tokyo (Vampires & Wolves)"; 9. Art vs. Science – "Magic Fountain"; 10. Mark Ronson & The Business Intl. featuring Boy George and Andrew Wyatt – "Somebody to Love Me"	Arcade Fire, Birds of Tokyo, Bliss n Eso, Gorillaz, Gypsy & The Cat, Mark Ronson & The Business Intl., Pendulum and Washington scored three tracks each in the countdown.; This is the first countdown since 1994 that features a female vocalist in the No. 1 song, and the first time since 1996 for any female member of the winning artist.; Boy & Bear's cover of Crowded House's "Fall at Your Feet" is the equal highest cover song. It is tied with Björk in 1995 and Spiderbait' in 2004.; Little Red equal the record of Killing Heidi, Grinspoon, Missy Higgins and Art vs. Science as the highest placing song by a Triple J Unearthed artist.
Australian Albums (2011)	1. Powderfinger – Odyssey Number Five (2000); 2. Silverchair – Frogstomp (1995); 3. AC/DC – Back in Black (1980); 4. The Living End – The Living End (1999); 5. INXS – Kick (1987); 6. Powderfinger – Internationalist (1998); 7. The Presets – Apocalypso (2008); 8. Wolfmother – Wolfmother (2005); 9. The Avalanches – Since I Left You (2000); 10. Regurgitator – Unit (1997)	Compiled in June 2011, and counted down between 28 June and 10 July.; The first Hottest 100 countdown that is not based on single tracks.; This is now the third Hottest 100 won by Powderfinger and the fourth won by Bernard Fanning.; Silverchair and Bernard Fanning both appeared five times in the countdown. Fanning appeared once solo and four times with Powderfinger.; Every one of Silverchair's studio albums reached the countdown.
2011	1. Gotye featuring Kimbra – "Somebody That I Used to Know"; 2. The Black Keys – "Lonely Boy"; 3. Matt Corby – "Brother"; 4. Boy & Bear – "Feeding Line"; 5. M83 – "Midnight City"; 6. Lana Del Rey – "Video Games"; 7. San Cisco – "Awkward"; 8. 360 featuring Gossling – "Boys like You"; 9. The Jezabels – "Endless Summer"; 10. Hilltop Hoods featuring Sia – "I Love It"	The Wombats and Kimbra scored four tracks each in the countdown.; This is the first collaboration between artists to win the Hottest 100.
2012	1. Macklemore and Ryan Lewis featuring Wanz – "Thrift Shop"; 2. Of Monsters and Men – "Little Talks"; 3. Alt-J – "Breezeblocks"; 4. Flume – "Holdin On"; 5. Mumford & Sons – "I Will Wait"; 6. Major Lazer featuring Amber Coffman – "Get Free"; 7. Tame Impala – "Elephant"; 8. Frank Ocean – "Lost"; 9. Tame Impala – "Feels Like We Only Go Backwards"; 10. The Rubens – "My Gun"	Flume scored four tracks in the countdown.; "Thrift Shop" is the first hip-hop song to top the chart in Hottest 100 history. It also breaks the record of highest ranking hip-hop song, which was previously set by Coolio, Gorillaz & Hilltop Hoods. All of whom managed to place third in 1995, 2005, 2006 & 2009.; For the first time since 2008 no Australian artist featured in the Top 3.; The four highest charting artists in this year's countdown were all debutantes. This is the first time this has happened since the first countdown in 1993.
20 Years of the Hottest 100 (2013)	1. Oasis – "Wonderwall" (1995); 2. The White Stripes – "Seven Nation Army" (2003); 3. Jeff Buckley – "Last Goodbye" (1994); 4. Hilltop Hoods – "The Nosebleed Section" (2003); 5. The Verve – "Bitter Sweet Symphony" (1997); 6. Foo Fighters – "Everlong" (1997); 7. The Killers – "Mr. Brightside" (2004); 8. Powderfinger – "These Days" (1999); 9. Gotye featuring Kimbra – "Somebody That I Used to Know" (2011); 10. Powderfinger – "My Happiness" (2000)	Voting was held in May 2013, results were broadcast on the 8 and 9 June 2013.; Daft Punk, Damon Albarn, Dave Grohl, The Killers and Silverchair scored three tracks each in the countdown.; Four tracks in the countdown had not been charted in an annual Hottest 100.
2013	1. Vance Joy – "Riptide"; 2. Lorde – "Royals"; 3. Daft Punk featuring Pharrell – "Get Lucky"; 4. Arctic Monkeys – "Do I Wanna Know?"; 5. Flume & Chet Faker – "Drop the Game"; 6. Arctic Monkeys – "Why'd You Only Call Me When You're High?"; 7. Lana Del Rey – "Young and Beautiful"; 8. Matt Corby – "Resolution"; 9. The Preatures – "Is This How You Feel?"; 10. London Grammar – "Strong"	Daft Punk and Ezra Koenig scored four tracks each in the countdown.; Two versions of "Get Lucky" appeared in the countdown, the original by Daft Punk at number 3 and San Cisco's cover at number 39; this is the first time it has happened since 2004.; Vance Joy is the first Triple J Unearthed artist to place first in the Hottest 100.
2014	1. Chet Faker – "Talk Is Cheap"; 2. Peking Duk featuring Nicole Millar – "High"; 3. Hilltop Hoods – "Cosby Sweater"; 4. Milky Chance – "Stolen Dance"; 5. Peking Duk featuring Safia – "Take Me Over"; 6. Mark Ronson featuring Bruno Mars – "Uptown Funk"; 7. Chet Faker – "Gold"; 8. Chet Faker – "1998"; 9. Sia – "Chandelier"; 10. Ásgeir – "King and Cross"	Chet Faker scored four tracks in the countdown.; Chet Faker became the second artist to chart three times in the top 10 places after Powderfinger achieved the feat in 2003.; The 2014 countdown featured 55 Australian entries, breaking the previous record of 52, set in 1999 and equaled in 2007.; Peking Duk are the sixth band to appear twice in the Top 5, the first to do so since Kings of Leon and MGMT in 2008.; Zach de la Rocha's appearance with Run the Jewels marks his first return to a Hottest 100 since 2001. His 13-year absence equals the record set by Robert Smith in 2010 and Ben Folds Five in 2012.; Hilltop Hoods finish No. 3 for the third time.
2015	1. The Rubens – "Hoops"; 2. Kendrick Lamar – "King Kunta"; 3. Major Lazer & DJ Snake featuring MØ – "Lean On"; 4. Tame Impala – "The Less I Know the Better"; 5. Tame Impala – "Let It Happen"; 6. Marcus Marr & Chet Faker – "The Trouble with Us"; 7. Jarryd James – "Do You Remember"; 8. Hermitude featuring Mataya & Young Tapz – "The Buzz"; 9. The Weeknd – "Can't Feel My Face"; 10. Disclosure featuring Lorde – "Magnets"	Tame Impala and Courtney Barnett scored four tracks each in the countdown.
2016	1. Flume featuring Kai – "Never Be Like You"; 2. Amy Shark – "Adore"; 3. Tash Sultana – "Jungle"; 4. Hilltop Hoods featuring Montaigne and Tom Thum – "1955"; 5. Childish Gambino – "Redbone"; 6. DMA's – "Believe" (Like a Version); 7. Illy featuring Vera Blue – "Papercuts"; 8. Flume featuring Tove Lo – "Say It"; 9. Peking Duk featuring Elliphant – "Stranger"; 10. The Weeknd featuring Daft Punk – "Starboy"	Violent Soho scored five tracks in the countdown.; 2016's countdown featured 66 Australian entries, breaking the previous record of 59 set in 2014.; This countdown set a new record for the longest Australian winning streak in the Hottest 100 (2013–2016), beating the previous streak between 1999 and 2001.
2017	1. Kendrick Lamar – "Humble."; 2. Gang of Youths – "Let Me Down Easy"; 3. Angus & Julia Stone – "Chateau"; 4. Methyl Ethel – "Ubu"; 5. Gang of Youths – "The Deepest Sighs, the Frankest Shadows"; 6. Lorde – "Green Light"; 7. Pnau – "Go Bang"; 8. Thundamentals featuring Mataya – "Sally"; 9. Vance Joy – "Lay It on Me"; 10. Gang of Youths – "What Can I Do If the Fire Goes Out?"	Kendrick Lamar, Gang of Youths, Lorde and The Jungle Giants scored four tracks each in the countdown.; Gang of Youths became the third artist to chart three times in the top 10, joining Chet Faker (2014) and Powderfinger (2003), and the seventh artist to place twice in the top 5.; Kendrick Lamar is the first African-American person to top the Hottest 100.; Kendrick Lamar becomes the first artist to place first in a countdown after previously coming second.
2018	1. Ocean Alley – "Confidence"; 2. Fisher – "Losing It"; 3. Travis Scott – "Sicko Mode"; 4. Childish Gambino – "This Is America"; 5. Amy Shark – "I Said Hi"; 6. Dean Lewis – "Be Alright"; 7. Mallrat – "Groceries"; 8. Billie Eilish – "When the Party's Over"; 9. Ruby Fields – "Dinosaurs"; 10. Ocean Alley – "Knees"	Ocean Alley scored four tracks in the countdown, and became the second artist to be voted into No. 1 and No. 100 during the same countdown, after Powderfinger in 1999.
2019	1. Billie Eilish – "Bad Guy"; 2. Flume featuring Vera Blue – "Rushing Back"; 3. Mallrat – "Charlie"; 4. Tones and I – "Dance Monkey"; 5. Denzel Curry – "Bulls on Parade" (Like a Version); 6. G Flip – "Drink Too Much"; 7. Lime Cordiale – "Robbery"; 8. The Jungle Giants – "Heavy Hearted"; 9. Thelma Plum – "Better in Blak"; 10. Hilltop Hoods featuring Illy and Ecca Vandal – "Exit Sign"	Billie Eilish scored five tracks in the countdown. The highest total from a female artist.; Billie Eilish becomes the youngest artist and the first female solo artist to top the Hottest 100.; Slipknot mark their first appearance in a Hottest 100 since 2000, their 19-year absence breaking the record for the longest in Hottest 100 history at the time.; Denzel Curry's Like a Version cover of Rage Against the Machine's "Bulls on Parade" is the equal highest cover song. It is tied with Björk, Spiderbait and Boy & Bear who achieved the feat in 1995, 2004 and 2010 respectively.
2010s (2020)	1. Tame Impala – "The Less I Know the Better" (2015); 2. Gotye featuring Kimbra – "Somebody That I Used to Know" (2011); 3. Arctic Monkeys – "Do I Wanna Know?" (2013); 4. Violent Soho – "Covered in Chrome" (2013); 5. Rüfüs Du Sol – "Innerbloom" (2015); 6. Gang of Youths – "Magnolia" (2015); 7. Foster the People – "Pumped Up Kicks" (2010); 8. Flume featuring Kai – "Never Be Like You" (2016); 9. Angus & Julia Stone – "Big Jet Plane" (2010); 10. Matt Corby – "Brother" (2011)	Voting took place between 11 February and 9 March 2020, results were broadcast on 14 March 2020.; Tracks placing between 101 and 200 were aired between 10 and 13 March 2020.; Flume scored five tracks in the countdown and also was featured on two remixes with a total of seven appearances in the countdown.; Rüfüs Du Sol were the first artist to have a song and its remix by What So Not to appear in the same countdown.; Kanye West scored five tracks in the countdown.; Tame Impala's win marks the first time since 1991 that the winning song hadn't previously won any countdown.; Nine tracks in the countdown had not charted in a previous Hottest 100.
2020	1. Glass Animals – "Heat Waves"; 2. Spacey Jane – "Booster Seat"; 3. Flume and Toro y Moi – "The Difference"; 4. Ball Park Music – "Cherub"; 5. Tame Impala – "Lost in Yesterday"; 6. Cardi B and Megan Thee Stallion – "WAP"; 7. G Flip – "Hyperfine"; 8. The Jungle Giants – "Sending Me Ur Loving"; 9. Hilltop Hoods – "I'm Good?"; 10. Billie Eilish – "Therefore I Am"	Lime Cordiale scored five tracks in the countdown.; Flume becomes the first artist to have placed in each of the top 5 spots of the countdown.
2021	1. The Wiggles – "Elephant" (Like a Version); 2. The Kid Laroi and Justin Bieber – "Stay"; 3. Spacey Jane – "Lots of Nothing"; 4. Olivia Rodrigo – "Good 4 U"; 5. Billie Eilish – "Happier Than Ever"; 6. Gang of Youths – "The Angel of 8th Ave."; 7. Doja Cat and SZA – "Kiss Me More"; 8. Lil Nas X and Jack Harlow – "Industry Baby"; 9. Rüfüs Du Sol – "On My Knees"; 10. Lil Nas X – "Montero (Call Me by Your Name)"	Olivia Rodrigo and Doja Cat scored five tracks each in the countdown.; The Wiggles' "Elephant" becomes the first Like a Version cover to place first in the Hottest 100.; Original Wiggles member Jeff Fatt becomes the oldest artist to top the Hottest 100.; The Kid Laroi becomes the highest ranking Indigenous Australian artist in Hottest 100 history.
2022	1. Flume featuring May-a – "Say Nothing"; 2. Eliza Rose and Interplanetary Criminal – "B.O.T.A. (Baddest of Them All)"; 3. Spacey Jane – "Hardlight"; 4. Steve Lacy – "Bad Habit"; 5. Spacey Jane – "It's Been a Long Day"; 6. Spacey Jane – "Sitting Up"; 7. Lizzo – "About Damn Time"; 8. Ball Park Music – "Stars in My Eyes"; 9. Gang of Youths – "In the Wake of Your Leave"; 10. Joji – "Glimpse of Us"	Spacey Jane scored six tracks in the countdown, including three songs in the top 10 – a feat only achieved three other times in the countdown's history (most recently, Gang of Youths in 2017). The band also became the eighth artist to have two songs poll in the top 5.; Flume became the second artist after Powderfinger to top the Hottest 100 a second time, having previously had the No. 1 song in 2016.; Spacey Jane are the first artist to feature in the top 3 of a countdown for the third consecutive year. They also finished third for the second year in a row.
Like a Version (2023)	1. DMA's – "Believe" (2016); 2. Denzel Curry – "Bulls on Parade" (2019); 3. Ocean Alley – "Baby Come Back" (2018); 4. Lime Cordiale – "I Touch Myself" (2019); 5. A.B. Original featuring Paul Kelly and Dan Sultan – "Dumb Things" (2016); 6. Gang of Youths – "Blood" (2017); 7. King Stingray – "Yellow" (2022); 8. Thundamentals – "Brother" (2012); 9. Chet Faker – "(Lover) You Don't Treat Me No Good" (2014); 10. The Wiggles – "Elephant" (2021)	Celebrating 20 years of Triple J's live music segment, Like a Version.; Gang of Youths and Paul Dempsey both scored three tracks in the countdown.
2023	1. Doja Cat – "Paint the Town Red"; 2. G Flip – "The Worst Person Alive"; 3. Dom Dolla – "Saving Up"; 4. MK and Dom Dolla – "Rhyme Dust"; 5. Cassö, Raye and D-Block Europe – "Prada"; 6. Fred Again.. and Obongjayar – "Adore U"; 7. Billie Eilish – "What Was I Made For?"; 8. Troye Sivan – "Rush"; 9. Jack Harlow – "Lovin on Me"; 10. Post Malone – "Chemical"	G Flip scored a record seven tracks in the countdown. Breaking the record set by Wolfmother in 2005 and Spacey Jane in 2022.; Doja Cat becomes the first female African-American artist and rapper to top the Hottest 100.; Kylie Minogue marks her first appearance in the countdown since 1997, breaking the record for the longest gap between entries in Hottest 100 history with her 26-year absence.; Dom Dolla is the ninth artist to have two songs poll in the top 5. He also equals The Offspring's record set in 1994 for the highest consecutive appearances in a Hottest 100.
2024	1. Chappell Roan – "Good Luck, Babe!"; 2. Royel Otis – "Murder on the Dancefloor" (Like a Version); 3. Billie Eilish – "Birds of a Feather"; 4. Lola Young – "Messy"; 5. Gracie Abrams – "That's So True"; 6. Charli XCX featuring Billie Eilish – "Guess"; 7. Dom Dolla – "Girls"; 8. Kendrick Lamar – "Not Like Us"; 9. G Flip – "Cruel Summer" (Like a Version); 10. Fred Again and Baby Keem – "Leavemealone"	Charli XCX and Billie Eilish both had eight appearances in the countdown, setting the current record for the most appearances by an artist in a single countdown.; The 2024 countdown featured 29 Australian entries, the lowest since 1996.
Australian Songs (2025)	1. INXS – "Never Tear Us Apart" (1987); 2. Hilltop Hoods – "The Nosebleed Section" (2003); 3. The Veronicas – "Untouched" (2007); 4. Missy Higgins – "Scar" (2004); 5. Crowded House – "Don't Dream It's Over" (1986); 6. Powderfinger – "My Happiness" (2000); 7. Cold Chisel – "Flame Trees" (1984); 8. Cold Chisel – "Khe Sanh (1978); 9. Paul Kelly – "How to Make Gravy" (1996); 10. Gotye featuring Kimbra – "Somebody That I Used to Know" (2011)	The first Hottest 100 specifically for Australian songs.; Bernard Fanning scored four tracks on the countdown; three with Powderfinger and one as a solo artist.
2025	1. Olivia Dean – "Man I Need"; 2. Keli Holiday – "Dancing2"; 3. Tame Impala – "Dracula"; 4. Playlunch – "Keith"; 5. Raye – "Where Is My Husband!"; 6. Spacey Jane – "Whateverrrr"; 7. Olivia Dean – "Nice to Each Other"; 8. Sombr – "12 to 12"; 9. Disco Lines and Tinashe – "No Broke Boys"; 10. Ball Park Music – "Please Don't Move to Melbourne"	Olivia Dean and Spacey Jane scored five tracks each in the countdown.; Adam Hyde became the second artist after Ben Lee to have a song at No. 2 in a Hottest 100 for a second time, having previously featured at No. 2 song in 2014 with Peking Duk.

== Impact ==
Triple J's Hottest 100 has been branded a "national institution" and "the world's greatest music democracy". According to Cameron Adams from the Herald Sun, the countdown is one of Australia's most powerful brands, and that "commercial radio would kill to have the engagement Triple J and the Hottest 100 have with their audience."

The countdown receives millions of votes every year — in 2019, a record of 3.2 million were cast. In 2022, one in two Australians engaged with the Hottest 100 campaign, and 3.6 million people listened on the day, according to national ratings.

Coming up in Australia, the Hottest 100 is a direct path to getting noticed, and trying to recreate that in the [United] States is overwhelming.

— Mitch Galbraith of Ocean Alley

Musicians who have taken out the number one spot have often seen a popularity boost after the annual countdown. Following Alex Lloyd winning the 2001 countdown with "Amazing", it became the most played song on Australian radio for the next year. The singer said commercial stations only started playing it after his win on Triple J; from royalties then received, he was able to buy a house. Alternative rock band the Rubens won the Hottest 100 of 2015 and immediately had to upgrade the venues for their upcoming tour due to an influx of new fans.

== Voter turnout and fundraising ==
Since the 2015 countdown, Triple J has annually partnered with an Australian organisation to donate all funds raised from Hottest 100 merchandise, usually a T-shirt branded with the countdown's logo. In total, these fundraisers have raised over $3.3 million for a variety of causes that the broadcaster deems most important to listeners each year.

List of votes counted and fundraising history
Year	Votes cast	VR?	Charity partner	Amount raised	Ref.
1990 (All Time)	10,000	Maybe	—N/a	—N/a	
1993	50,000	Maybe	—N/a	—N/a	
1995	100,000	Maybe	—N/a	—N/a	
1996	300,000	Maybe	—N/a	—N/a	
1997	250,000		—N/a	—N/a	
1998	500,000	Maybe	—N/a	—N/a	
1998 (All Time)	100,000		—N/a	—N/a	
1999	650,000	Maybe	—N/a	—N/a	
2000	900,000	Maybe	—N/a	—N/a	
2001	350,000		—N/a	—N/a	
2003	383,000		—N/a	—N/a	
2004	475,000		—N/a	—N/a	
2005	606,060		—N/a	—N/a	
2006	671,024		—N/a	—N/a	
2007	700,000		—N/a	—N/a	
2008	800,000		—N/a	—N/a	
2009	1,100,000	Maybe	—N/a	—N/a	
2009 (All Time)	500,000		—N/a	—N/a	
2010	1,260,000	Maybe	—N/a	—N/a	
2011	1,378,869	Maybe	—N/a	—N/a	
2011 (Australian Albums)	47,000		—N/a	—N/a	
2012	1,516,765	Maybe	—N/a	—N/a	
2013	1,490,000		—N/a	—N/a	
2013 (Past 20 Years)	940,000		—N/a	—N/a	
2014	2,099,707	Maybe	—N/a	—N/a	
2015	2,094,000		Australian Indigenous; Mentoring Experience	$100,000	
2016	2,255,110	Maybe	Australian Indigenous; Mentoring Experience	$250,000	
2017	2,286,133	Maybe	Australian Indigenous; Mentoring Experience	$250,000	
2018	2,758,584	Maybe	Lifeline	$631,000	
2019	3,211,596	Maybe	Greening Australia	$250,000	
2020 (2010s)	1,869,659		—N/a	—N/a	
2020	2,790,224		Lifeline	$653,000	
2021	2,700,000		Lifeline	$1,200,000	
2022	2,436,565		Australian Conservation; Foundation	$550,000	
2023	2,355,870		Headspace	$502,000	
2024	2,489,446		We Are Mobilise	$312,000	
2025 (Australian Songs)	2,655,826		—N/a		
2025	2,100,000		We Are Mobilise	$500,000	

== Notable artists ==
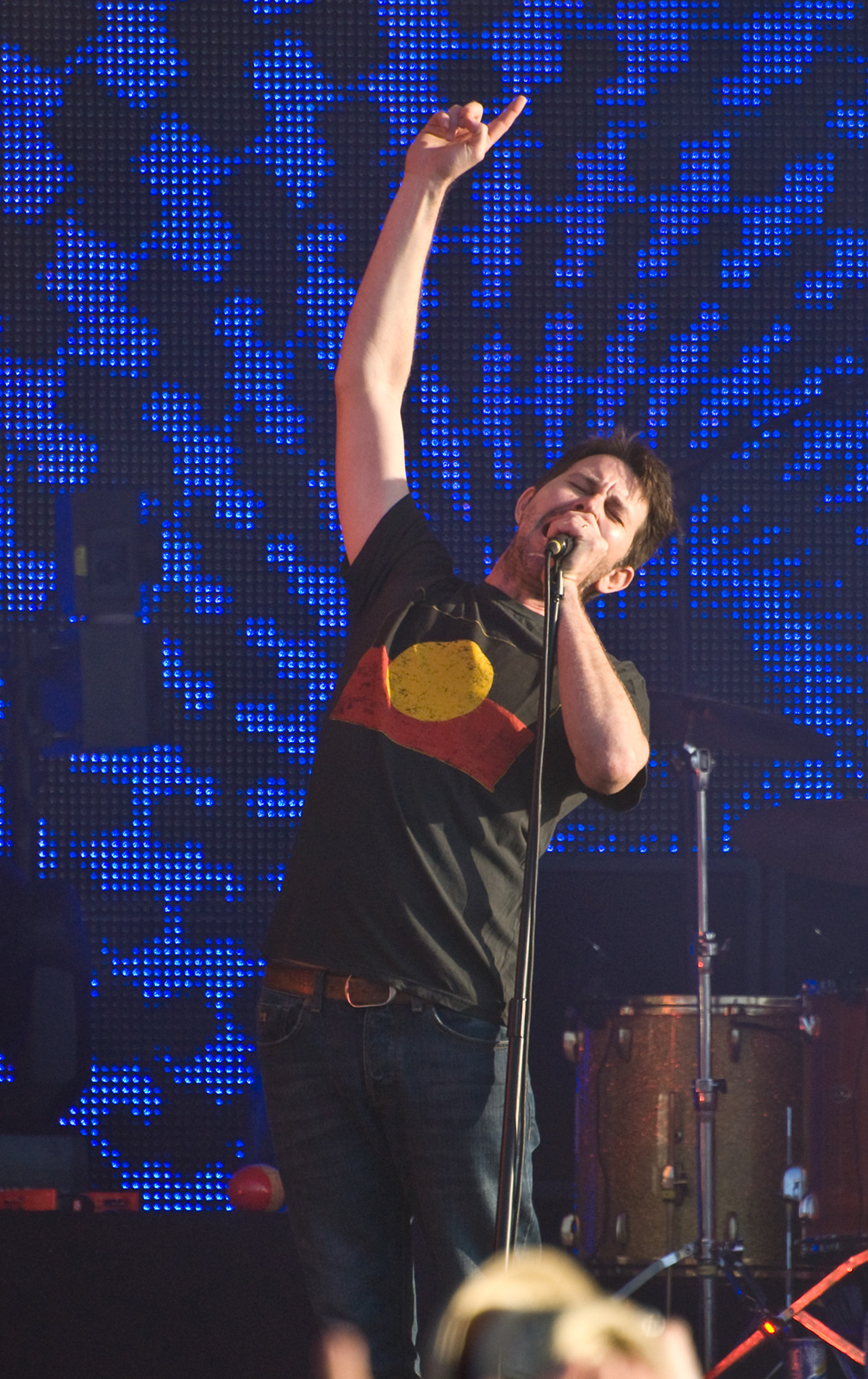
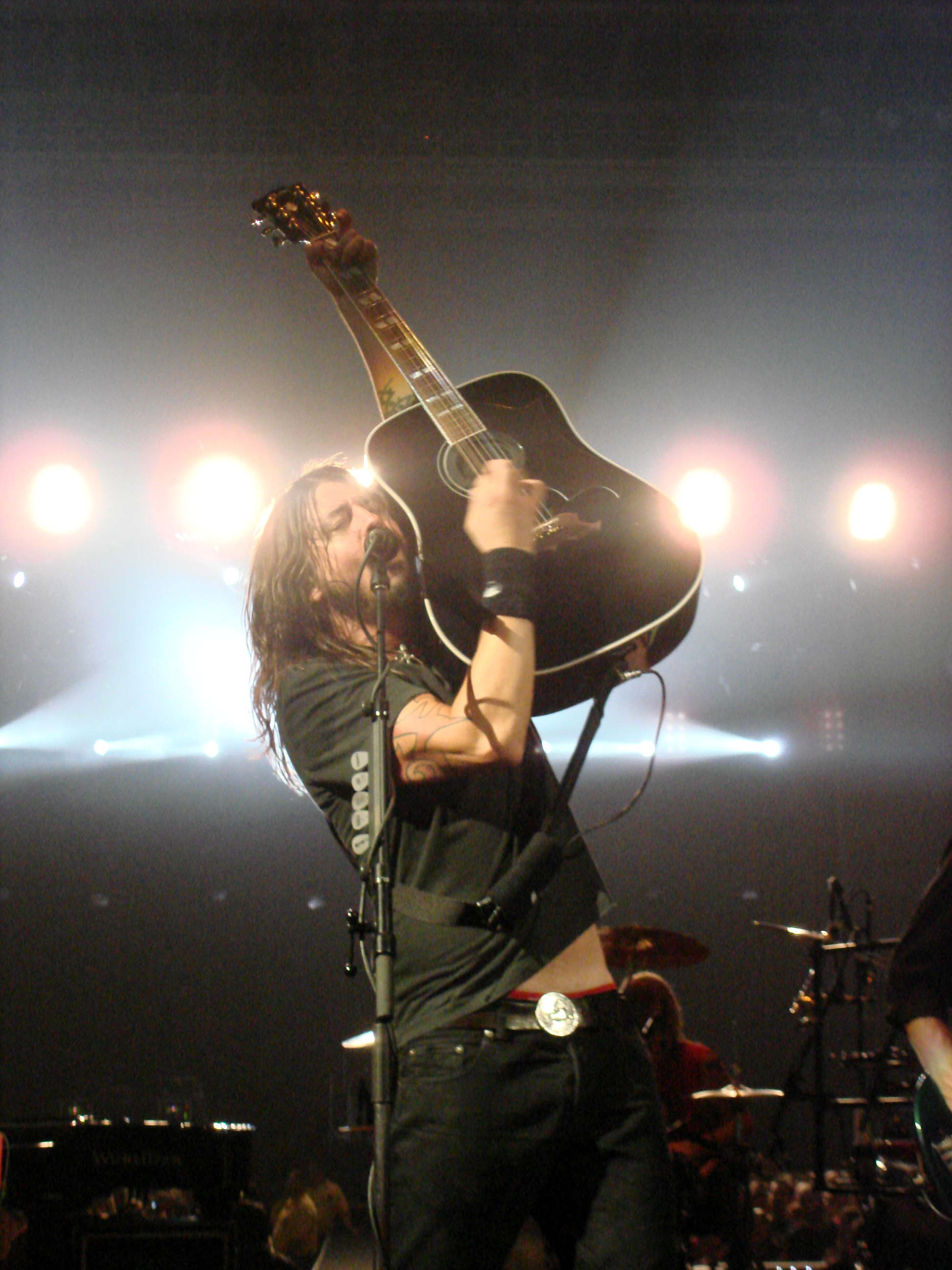
Bernard Fanning (left) and Dave Grohl (right) are among the most frequently featured musicians in the history of the Hottest 100. Fanning has the most overall wins, while Grohl made the most appearances in a single countdown in 2002.

Since its inception, the artist who has been featured the most in the annual countdown is Hilltop Hoods, who has appeared 28 times from 2003 to 2025; the second most appearances is shared by Billie Eilish and G Flip who have both featured 25 times; Tame Impala have the third most appearances with 23; followed by 22 songs by Powderfinger (between 1996 and 2009); the Foo Fighters (between 1995 and 2014); and Flume (between 2012 and 2022).

Powderfinger frontman, Bernard Fanning, is the only artist to have taken the top spot on four occasions—three times in the annual countdown, twice with Powderfinger in 1999 and 2000, and as a solo artist in 2005; additionally, he topped one all-time list in 2011 with Powderfinger on the Australian albums countdown. Flume (2016 and 2022) and Powderfinger are the only artists to have topped an annual countdown more than once.

Dave Grohl, frontman of the Foo Fighters, has appeared in annual countdowns 32 times, including five times with Queens of the Stone Age in 2002, four times with Nirvana, and once with Them Crooked Vultures. Grohl also holds the record for the most appearances in a single countdown, racking up ten entries with the Foo Fighters, Nirvana and Queens of the Stone Age in 2002.

Hilltop Hoods have also featured in annual 15 countdowns, the highest total of any artist. The record for the most consecutive appearances belongs to The Living End, who featured in every annual countdown from 1997 to 2006.

When including all of Triple J's countdowns (adding the five Hottest 100 of All Time countdowns, the 2011 Australian Albums countdown, and the 2013 Twenty Years countdown), The Cure has made more appearances than any other band, with 31 entries in the All Time countdowns and five in the yearly countdowns. Powderfinger and Silverchair have been featured 30 and 28 times, respectively, in total. As for individuals, Dave Grohl has achieved 47 entries (24 with Foo Fighters, 15 with Nirvana, seven with Queens of the Stone Age, and one with Them Crooked Vultures), Bernard Fanning has 33 (30 with Powderfinger, three as a solo artist), and Robert Smith has 32 (31 with The Cure, one from a solo collaboration with Crystal Castles in 2010).

== Hottest station ==
Triple J Hottest
- Worldwide (internet radio)

Ownership
- Owner: Australian Broadcasting Corporation
- Sister stations: Triple J; Double J; Unearthed

History
- First air date: 17 July 2023

Links
- Website: www.abc.net.au/triplej/live/triplejhottest

Triple J Hottest is a standalone internet radio station, streaming on the Triple J app and website. It was launched in 2023, coinciding with the Hottest 100 of Like a Version.

The station exclusively broadcasts songs that have placed in previous Hottest 100 countdowns. It also plays interviews with artists that have featured. It broadcasts 24/7, and is the only Triple J station to have no presenters.

== See also ==
- 4ZZZ Hot 100, the Brisbane countdown that inspired the Hottest 100
- KROQ Top 106.7 Countdowns
- Festive Fifty
- Top 2000
- Top 100 Books of the 21st Century
