= Triple J's Hottest 100 of 1991 =

Australian radio station music survey

1991 Triple J Hottest 100

Countdown details
- Date of countdown: 9 February 1992

Countdown highlights
- Winning song: Nirvana "Smells Like Teen Spirit"
- Most entries: The Cure (9 tracks)

Chronology
← Previous; 1990	Next → 1993

The 1991 Triple J Hottest 100 (sometimes referred to as Hottest 100 of 1992) was the third yearly poll of the most popular songs, according to listeners of the Australian radio station Triple J. The countdown was held on 9 February 1992 and was the final annual countdown in which listeners could vote for songs released in any year.

There was no poll in 1992, and from 1993, the poll was restricted to songs released the same year. Supplementary "Hottest 100 of All Time" polls allowing songs from any year were held in 1998 and 2009.

This was also the first poll to feature a publicly announced list of songs in positions #101 to #200. The list was posted on the Triple J website in their Hottest 100 History section until late 2004 under 1992. Despite this, an audio clip from the 1991 Hottest 100 features the announcer jokingly playing "Black or White" by Michael Jackson at the number one song before saying it was actually #113 (although the actual list shows it reached #112). Triple J would later reveal the #101 to #200 songs from the 2008 list onwards.

== Full list ==
Note: Australian artists

#	Song	Artist	Country of origin	Year of release	Previous Hottest 100 of all time positions
1	Smells Like Teen Spirit	Nirvana	United States	1991	
2	Love Will Tear Us Apart	Joy Division	United Kingdom	1979	1 (1989), 1 (1990)
3	Lithium	Nirvana	United States	1991	
4	Throw Your Arms Around Me	Hunters & Collectors	Australia	1984	2 (1989), 2 (1990)
5	Tomorrow Wendy	Andy Prieboy	United States	1990	
6	How Soon Is Now?	The Smiths	United Kingdom	1984	7 (1989), 3 (1990)
7	Fools Gold	The Stone Roses	United Kingdom	1989	6 (1990)
8	A Forest	The Cure	United Kingdom	1980	10 (1989), 11 (1990)
9	Blister in the Sun	Violent Femmes	United States	1983	46 (1989), 41 (1990)
10	Blue Monday	New Order	United Kingdom	1983	5 (1989), 5 (1990)
11	Just Like Heaven	The Cure	United Kingdom	1987	25 (1990)
12	It's the End of the World as We Know It (And I Feel Fine)	R.E.M.	United States	1987	22 (1989), 9 (1990)
13	Uncertain Smile	The The	United Kingdom	1983	3 (1989), 4 (1990)
14	The Ship Song	Nick Cave & the Bad Seeds	Australia	1990	
15	Been Caught Stealing	Jane's Addiction	United States	1990	
16	She Sells Sanctuary	The Cult	United Kingdom	1985	35 (1989), 22 (1990)
17	Jane Says	Jane's Addiction	United States	1988	
18	Add It Up	Violent Femmes	United States	1983	87 (1990)
19	Wuthering Heights	Kate Bush	United Kingdom	1978	43 (1989), 17 (1990)
20	Lock It	Falling Joys	Australia	1990	
21	Kiss Off	Violent Femmes	United States	1983	
22	Sexuality	Billy Bragg	United Kingdom	1991	
23	That's Entertainment	The Jam	United Kingdom	1980	4 (1989), 10 (1990)
24	Bizarre Love Triangle	New Order	United Kingdom	1986	67 (1989), 21 (1990)
25	Anarchy in the U.K.	Sex Pistols	United Kingdom	1976	17 (1989), 20 (1990)
26	Holiday in Cambodia	Dead Kennedys	United States	1980	6 (1989), 12 (1990)
27	Sweet Child o' Mine	Guns N' Roses	United States	1987	
28	Debaser	Pixies	United States	1989	18 (1990)
29	This Charming Man	The Smiths	United Kingdom	1983	13 (1989), 7 (1990)
30	Stairway to Heaven	Led Zeppelin	United Kingdom	1971	30 (1989), 61 (1990)
31	Under the Milky Way	The Church	Australia	1988	14 (1990)
32	Losing My Religion	R.E.M.	United States	1991	
33	Hieronymus	The Clouds	Australia	1991	
34	D.C.	Died Pretty	Australia	1991	
35	Primary	The Cure	United Kingdom	1981	19 (1989), 19 (1990)
36	There Is a Light That Never Goes Out	The Smiths	United Kingdom	1986	64 (1989), 44 (1990)
37	Close to Me	The Cure	United Kingdom	1985	66 (1989)
38	Shivers	The Boys Next Door	Australia	1978	12 (1989), 15 (1990)
39	Give It Away	Red Hot Chili Peppers	United States	1991	
40	The One I Love	R.E.M.	United States	1987	45 (1989), 46 (1990)
41	That Ain't Bad	Ratcat	Australia	1990	
42	Troy	Sinéad O'Connor	Ireland	1987	41 (1989), 13 (1990)
43	Boys Don't Cry	The Cure	United Kingdom	1980	29 (1989), 23 (1990)
44	Lullaby	The Cure	United Kingdom	1989	43 (1990)
45	Talking to a Stranger	Hunters & Collectors	Australia	1982	8 (1989), 32 (1990)
46	Birdhouse in Your Soul	They Might Be Giants	United States	1990	
47	Aloha Steve and Danno	Radio Birdman	Australia	1978	23 (1989), 54 (1990)
48	In Between Days	The Cure	United Kingdom	1985	72 (1990)
49	Bohemian Rhapsody	Queen	United Kingdom	1975	
50	Song to the Siren	This Mortal Coil	United Kingdom	1983	15 (1989), 31 (1990)
51	Trust	Tall Tales and True	Australia	1989	93 (1990)
52	Wide Open Road	The Triffids	Australia	1986	68 (1989), 49 (1990)
53	Betty's Worry or the Slab	Hunters & Collectors	Australia	1984	83 (1989), 26 (1990)
54	Tainted Love	Soft Cell	United Kingdom	1981	38 (1990)
55	True Faith	New Order	United Kingdom	1987	68 (1990)
56	Kool Thing	Sonic Youth	United States	1990	
57	Waiting for the Great Leap Forwards	Billy Bragg	United Kingdom	1988	20 (1989), 58 (1990)
58	Wish You Were Here	Pink Floyd	United Kingdom	1975	33 (1989), 35 (1990)
59	The End	The Doors	United States	1967	50 (1989), 52 (1990)
60	Enter Sandman	Metallica	United States	1991	
61	All Along the Watchtower	The Jimi Hendrix Experience	United States	1968	49 (1989), 83 (1990)
62	Orange Crush	R.E.M.	United States	1988	99 (1990)
63	The Unforgiven	Metallica	United States	1991	
64	Unfinished Sympathy	Massive Attack	United Kingdom	1991	
65	Fall on Me	R.E.M.	United States	1986	78 (1990)
66	Down in Splendour	Straitjacket Fits	New Zealand	1990	
67	4PM	The Clouds	Australia	1991	
68	Pictures of You	The Cure	United Kingdom	1989	
69	Labour of Love	Frente!	Australia	1991	
70	The Unguarded Moment	The Church	Australia	1981	42 (1989), 57 (1990)
71	Grey Cell Green	Ned's Atomic Dustbin	United Kingdom	1991	
72	Bigmouth Strikes Again	The Smiths	United Kingdom	1986	27 (1989), 57 (1990)
73	Comfortably Numb	Pink Floyd	United Kingdom	1979	95 (1990)
74	The Love Cats	The Cure	United Kingdom	1983	67 (1990)
75	Levi Stubbs' Tears	Billy Bragg	United Kingdom	1986	82 (1990)
76	Come as You Are	Nirvana	United States	1991	
77	Rock Lobster	The B-52's	United States	1978	14 (1989), 8 (1990)
78	L.A. Woman	The Doors	United States	1971	40 (1989), 62 (1990)
79	Freak Scene	Dinosaur Jr.	United States	1988	74 (1990)
80	Surfers of the Mind	Def FX	Australia	1990	
81	She Bangs the Drums	The Stone Roses	United Kingdom	1989	51 (1990)
82	Vapour Trail	Ride	United Kingdom	1991	
83	Treaty	Yothu Yindi	Australia	1991	
84	Another Girl, Another Planet	The Only Ones	United Kingdom	1978	26 (1989), 30 (1990)
85	Anything, Anything (I'll Give You)	Dramarama	United States	1985	
86	The Size of a Cow	The Wonder Stuff	United Kingdom	1991	
87	Sympathy for the Devil	The Rolling Stones	United Kingdom	1968	63 (1989), 77 (1990)
88	The Mercy Seat	Nick Cave & the Bad Seeds	Australia	1988	100 (1989)
89	One	Metallica	United States	1989	
90	Soon	My Bloody Valentine	Ireland	1991	
91	Monkey Gone to Heaven	Pixies	United States	1989	34 (1990)
92	Bring the Noise	Public Enemy	United States	1987	
93	Dear God	XTC	United Kingdom	1986	
94	Wave of Mutilation	Pixies	United States	1989	
95	Info Freako	Jesus Jones	United Kingdom	1989	45 (1990)
96	Cattle and Cane	The Go-Betweens	Australia	1983	11 (1989), 27 (1990)
97	London Calling	The Clash	United Kingdom	1979	18 (1989), 28 (1990)
98	Bad	U2	Ireland	1984	
99	Deanna	Nick Cave & the Bad Seeds	Australia	1988	70 (1989), 60 (1990)
100	Cream	Prince & the New Power Generation	United States	1991	

=== #101-#200 list ===
#	Song	Artist	Country of origin	Year of release	Previous Hottest 100 of all time positions
101	Right Here, Right Now	Jesus Jones	United Kingdom	1990	
102	Rush	Big Audio Dynamite II	United Kingdom	1991	
103	Birthday	The Sugarcubes	Iceland	1987	9 (1989), 16 (1990)
104	Reptile	The Church	Australia	1988	92 (1990)
105	Cloud Factory	The Clouds	Australia	1990	
106	Lovesong	The Cure	United Kingdom	1989	
107	Benchtop	Melanie Oxley and Chris Abrahams	Australia	1990	
108	I'm Too Sexy	Right Said Fred	United Kingdom	1991	
109	Move Any Mountain	The Shamen	United Kingdom	1990	
110	This Is the Day	The The	United Kingdom	1983	94 (1990)
111	Dirty Boots	Sonic Youth	United States	1990	
112	Black or White	Michael Jackson	United States	1991	
113	With or Without You	U2	Ireland	1987	
114	Why Can't I Be You?	The Cure	United Kingdom	1987	
115	Greetings to the New Brunette	Billy Bragg	United Kingdom	1986	38 (1989), 59 (1990)
116	Always on My Mind	Pet Shop Boys	United Kingdom	1988	
117	Here Comes Your Man	Pixies	United States	1989	55 (1990)
118	Lovesick	Gang Starr	United States	1990	
119	Stand	R.E.M.	United States	1988	
120	Three Days	Jane's Addiction	United States	1990	
121	Imagine	John Lennon	United Kingdom	1971	31 (1989), 66 (1990)
122	Riders on the Storm	The Doors	United States	1971	86 (1989)
123	Say Goodbye	Hunters & Collectors	Australia	1986	97 (1989), 71 (1990)
124	You Can't Always Get What You Want	The Rolling Stones	United Kingdom	1969	
125	Planet of Sound	Pixies	United States	1991	
126	A New England	Billy Bragg	United Kingdom	1983	
127	Atmosphere	Joy Division	United Kingdom	1980	84 (1990)
128	Rise	Public Image Ltd	United Kingdom	1986	
129	Should I Stay or Should I Go	The Clash	United Kingdom	1982	
130	Teen Age Riot	Sonic Youth	United States	1988	89 (1990)
131	More	The Sisters of Mercy	United Kingdom	1990	
132	Kiss	Prince & the Revolution	United States	1986	34 (1989), 39 (1990)
133	Suedehead	Morrissey	United Kingdom	1988	
134	Unfamiliar	Ride	United Kingdom	1991	
135	Peace Frog	The Doors	United States	1970	
136	Wise Up! Sucker	Pop Will Eat Itself	United Kingdom	1989	70 (1990)
137	Real Real Real	Jesus Jones	United Kingdom	1990	
138	Gett Off	Prince & the New Power Generation	United States	1991	
139	Fields of Joy	Lenny Kravitz	United States	1991	
140	Like a Daydream	Ride	United Kingdom	1990	
141	Just Can't Get Enough	Depeche Mode	United Kingdom	1981	100 (1990)
142	Mysterious Ways	U2	Ireland	1991	
143	Power and the Passion	Midnight Oil	Australia	1982	88 (1989)
144	Pride (In the Name of Love)	U2	Ireland	1984	
145	Golden Brown	The Stranglers	United Kingdom	1981	82 (1989)
146	Temptation	New Order	United Kingdom	1982	65 (1990)
147	Everybody Moves	Died Pretty	Australia	1989	47 (1990)
148	Love Rears Its Ugly Head	Living Colour	United States	1990	
149	Sign o' the Times	Prince	United States	1987	37 (1989), 37 (1990)
150	Ana Ng	They Might Be Giants	United States	1988	
151	Souleater	The Clouds	Australia	1991	
152	There's No Other Way	Blur	United Kingdom	1991	
153	Caught In My Shadow	The Wonder Stuff	United Kingdom	1991	
154	I Want You	Elvis Costello & the Attractions	United Kingdom	1986	58 (1989), 73 (1990)
155	You Could Be Mine	Guns N' Roses	United States	1991	
156	Psycho Killer	Talking Heads	United Kingdom	1977	32 (1989)
157	Rock the Casbah	The Clash	United Kingdom	1982	
158	Fight the Power	Public Enemy	United States	1989	29 (1990)
159	Enjoy the Silence	Depeche Mode	United Kingdom	1990	
160	Circlesquare	The Wonder Stuff	United Kingdom	1990	
161	Wicked Game	Chris Isaak	United States	1989	
162	"Heroes"	David Bowie	United Kingdom	1977	39 (1989), 50 (1990)
163	People Are Strange	The Doors	United States	1967	
164	Wild Flower	The Cult	United Kingdom	1987	
165	Nothing Compares 2 U	Sinéad O'Connor	Ireland	1990	69 (1990)
166	She Talks to Angels	The Black Crowes	United States	1990	
167	Going Underground	The Jam	United Kingdom	1980	75 (1989)
168	Bela Lugosi's Dead	Bauhaus	United Kingdom	1979	
169	When Doves Cry	Prince & the Revolution	United States	1984	
170	Into the Groove	Madonna	United States	1985	80 (1990)
171	God Is a Bullet	Concrete Blonde	United States	1989	76 (1990)
172	Head On	The Jesus and Mary Chain	United Kingdom	1989	
173	I Wanna Be Adored	The Stone Roses	United Kingdom	1989	
174	Suck My Kiss	Red Hot Chili Peppers	United States	1991	
175	Bye Bye Pride	The Go-Betweens	Australia	1987	89 (1989), 85 (1990)
176	Roadhouse Blues	The Doors	United States	1970	
177	You Are the Everything	R.E.M.	United States	1988	
178	Def. Con. One	Pop Will Eat Itself	United Kingdom	1988	
179	The Fly	U2	Ireland	1991	
180	The Globe	Big Audio Dynamite II	United Kingdom	1991	
181	Bob's Yer Uncle	Happy Mondays	United Kingdom	1990	
182	Eternally Yours	Laughing Clowns	Australia	1984	86 (1990)
183	Don't Want to Know If You Are Lonely	Hüsker Dü	United States	1986	
184	From a Million Miles	Single Gun Theory	Australia	1991	
185	Rush You	Baby Animals	Australia	1991	
186	Being Boring	Pet Shop Boys	United Kingdom	1990	
187	Too Drunk to Fuck	Dead Kennedys	United States	1981	
188	Fairytale of New York	The Pogues	United Kingdom	1987	
189	World Leader Pretend	R.E.M.	United States	1988	
190	Blush	The Hummingbirds	Australia	1989	
191	Unbelievable	EMF	United Kingdom	1990	
192	Human Nature	Gary Clail & On-U Sound System	United Kingdom	1991	
193	The Weeping Song	Nick Cave & the Bad Seeds	Australia	1990	
194	Lifeboat	Tall Tales and True	Australia	1991	
195	Higher Ground	Red Hot Chili Peppers	United States	1989	
196	Tomorrow, Wendy	Concrete Blonde	United States	1990	
197	Alison	Elvis Costello	United Kingdom	1977	16 (1989), 63 (1990)
198	Forbidden Colours	David Sylvian and Ryuichi Sakamoto	United Kingdom/Japan	1983	60 (1989), 75 (1990)
199	Purple Haze	The Jimi Hendrix Experience	United States	1967	
200	Love Removal Machine	The Cult	United Kingdom	1987	

== Statistics ==
=== Artists with multiple entries ===
#	Artist	Tracks
9	The Cure	8, 11, 35, 37, 43, 44, 48, 68, 74
5	R.E.M.	12, 32, 40, 62, 65
4	Peter Hook (Note: Once with Joy Division (2), three times with New Order (10, 24, 55))	2, 10, 24, 55
4	Stephen Morris	2, 10, 24, 55
4	Bernard Sumner	2, 10, 24, 55
4	The Smiths	6, 29, 36, 72
4	Nick Cave (Note: Three times with Nick Cave and the Bad Seeds (14, 88, 99), and once with The Boys Next Door (38),)	14, 38, 88, 99
3	Nirvana	1, 3, 76
3	Hunters and Collectors	4, 45, 53
3	Violent Femmes	9, 18, 21
3	New Order	10, 24, 55
3	Nick Cave and the Bad Seeds	14, 88, 99
3	Billy Bragg	22, 57, 75
3	Pixies	28, 91, 94
3	Metallica	60, 63, 89
2	The Stone Roses	7, 81
2	Jane's Addiction	15, 17
2	The Church	31, 70
2	The Clouds	33, 67
2	Pink Floyd	58, 73
2	The Doors	59, 78

=== Countries represented ===
Country	#
United Kingdom	43
United States	32
Australia	21
Ireland	3
New Zealand	1

=== Songs by Decade ===
Decade	#
1960s	3
1970s	13
1980s	56
1990s	28
