= Triple J's Hottest 100 of All Time, 2009 =

Most popular songs in Australia

2009 All Time Triple J Hottest 100

Countdown details
- Date of countdown: 7–12 July 2009

Countdown highlights
- Winning song: Nirvana "Smells Like Teen Spirit"
- Most entries: Dave Grohl (5 tracks)

Chronology
← Previous; 2008	Next → 2009

The Triple J Hottest 100 of All Time was a music poll conducted in 2009 amongst listeners of Australian youth radio network Triple J. Over half a million votes were compiled, with Nirvana's "Smells Like Teen Spirit" collecting the highest number of votes. Voters could submit a list of up to ten different songs as well as nominating one of these as their "all-time" favourite song.

It was the fifth such poll organised by Triple J, following similar polls in 1989, 1990, 1991, and 1998. Initially, all songs were eligible for annual Triple J Hottest 100s; however, from 1993 onward (after having no list in 1992), only songs released in the previous year were permitted. Thus, the Hottest 100 of All Time is conducted via a separate vote, held irregularly to reflect listeners' favourite songs across all eras.

The 2009 list was designed to reflect the twentieth anniversary of the Hottest 100's inception. The countdown was carried out from Tuesday, 7 July 2009 and finishing Sunday, 12 July 2009. The countdown was also broadcast over two nights on ABC TV's music show Rage. However, certain songs were omitted from the broadcast because they were never made into music videos.

== Full list ==
- Bold: Previous winner of a Hottest 100
- Green background: Australian artists

#	Song	Artist	Country of origin	Year	Annual Hottest 100 position	Previous Hottest 100 of All Time position/s
1	**Smells Like Teen Spirit**	**Nirvana**	**United States**	**1991**		**1 (1991), 1 (1998)**
2	Killing in the Name	Rage Against the Machine	United States	1992	6 (1993)	17 (1998)
3	Hallelujah	Jeff Buckley	United States	1994		
4	**Love Will Tear Us Apart**	**Joy Division**	**United Kingdom**	**1980**		**1 (1989), 1 (1990), 2 (1991), 16 (1998)**
5	Paranoid Android	Radiohead	United Kingdom	1997	7	13 (1998)
6	Bohemian Rhapsody	Queen	United Kingdom	1975		49 (1991), 8 (1998)
7	Last Goodbye	Jeff Buckley	United States	1994	14 (1995)	4 (1998)
8	Under the Bridge	Red Hot Chili Peppers	United States	1991		31 (1998)
9	Everlong	Foo Fighters	United States	1997	61 (2006)	
10	Stairway to Heaven	Led Zeppelin	United Kingdom	1971		30 (1989), 61 (1990), 30 (1991), 6 (1998)
11	Imagine	John Lennon	United Kingdom	1971		31 (1989), 66 (1990)
12	**Wonderwall**	**Oasis**	**United Kingdom**	**1995**	**1**	
13	Creep	Radiohead	United Kingdom	1992	2 (1993)	5 (1998)
14	Bitter Sweet Symphony	The Verve	United Kingdom	1997	4	99 (1998)
15	Karma Police	Radiohead	United Kingdom	1997	9	54 (1998)
16	Wish You Were Here	Pink Floyd	United Kingdom	1975		33 (1989), 35 (1990), 58 (1991), 41 (1998)
17	The Nosebleed Section	Hilltop Hoods	Australia	2003	9	
18	**Knights of Cydonia**	**Muse**	**United Kingdom**	**2006**	**1 (2007)**	
19	One	Metallica	United States	1988		89 (1991), 7 (1998)
20	Seven Nation Army	The White Stripes	United States	2003	3	
21	**These Days**	**Powderfinger**	**Australia**	**1999**	**1**	
22	Teardrop	Massive Attack	United Kingdom	1998	23	
23	Throw Your Arms Around Me	Hunters & Collectors	Australia	1984		2 (1989), 2 (1990), 4 (1991), 2 (1998)
24	A Day in the Life	The Beatles	United Kingdom	1967		69 (1989), 49 (1998)
25	Alive	Pearl Jam	United States	1991		3 (1998)
26	Thriller	Michael Jackson	United States	1982		
27	**My Happiness**	**Powderfinger**	**Australia**	**2000**	**1**	
28	Fake Plastic Trees	Radiohead	United Kingdom	1995		
29	Where Is My Mind?	Pixies	United States	1988		
30	All Along the Watchtower	The Jimi Hendrix Experience	United States	1968		49 (1989), 83 (1990), 61 (1991), 70 (1998)
31	Enter Sandman	Metallica	United States	1991		60 (1991), 9 (1998)
32	Blue Monday	New Order	United Kingdom	1983		5 (1989), 5 (1990), 10 (1991), 30 (1998)
33	Tomorrow	Silverchair	Australia	1994	5	59 (1998)
34	Prisoner of Society	The Living End	Australia	1997	15	18 (1998)
35	1979	The Smashing Pumpkins	United States	1995	13 (1996)	71 (1998)
36	Into My Arms	Nick Cave & the Bad Seeds	Australia	1997	18	84 (1998)
37	Stinkfist	Tool	United States	1996	2	24 (1998)
38	Mr. Brightside	The Killers	United States	2003	13 (2004)	
39	Better Man	Pearl Jam	United States	1994	44 (1995)	22 (1998)
40	Come as You Are	Nirvana	United States	1991		76 (1991), 62 (1998)
41	Billie Jean	Michael Jackson	United States	1982		
42	Banquet	Bloc Party	United Kingdom	2005		
43	God Only Knows	The Beach Boys	United States	1966		
44	Hey Jude	The Beatles	United Kingdom	1968		
45	**No One Knows**	**Queens of the Stone Age**	**United States**	**2002**	**1**	
46	Epic	Faith No More	United States	1989		19 (1998)
47	Betterman	The John Butler Trio	Australia	2001	5	
48	Sabotage	Beastie Boys	United States	1994	16	44 (1998)
49	Sweet Child o' Mine	Guns N' Roses	United States	1987		27 (1991), 77 (1998)
50	Don't Dream It's Over	Crowded House	Australia	1986		76 (1998)
51	Bullet with Butterfly Wings	The Smashing Pumpkins	United States	1995	2	33 (1998)
52	Berlin Chair	You Am I	Australia	1993	23 (1994)	61 (1998)
53	Comfortably Numb	Pink Floyd	United Kingdom	1979		95 (1990), 73 (1991), 90 (1998)
54	Close to Me	The Cure	United Kingdom	1985		66 (1989), 37 (1991), 89 (1998)
55	Like a Rolling Stone	Bob Dylan	United States	1965		
56	Lover, You Should've Come Over	Jeff Buckley	United States	1994		47 (1998)
57	Forty Six & 2	Tool	United States	1997	30	57 (1998)
58	Around the World	Daft Punk	France	1997		
59	**One Crowded Hour**	**Augie March**	**Australia**	**2006**	**1**	
60	Hurt	Johnny Cash	United States	2002		
61	Song 2	Blur	United Kingdom	1997	2	46 (1998)
62	Closer	Nine Inch Nails	United States	1994	2	14 (1998)
63	Thunderstruck	AC/DC	Australia	1990		
64	Blister in the Sun	Violent Femmes	United States	1983		46 (1989), 41 (1990), 9 (1991), 15 (1998)
65	Born Slippy .NUXX	Underworld	United Kingdom	1995	12 (1996)	
66	Tiny Dancer	Elton John	United Kingdom	1971		
67	Brick	Ben Folds Five	United States	1997	12 (1998)	32 (1998)
68	Dammit	Blink-182	United States	1997	6	20 (1998)
69	Grace	Jeff Buckley	United States	1994	89 (1995)	29 (1998)
70	Breathe	The Prodigy	United Kingdom	1996	7	95 (1998)
71	How Soon Is Now?	The Smiths	United Kingdom	1984		7 (1989), 3 (1990), 6 (1991), 28 (1998)
72	New Slang	The Shins	United States	2001		
73	London Calling	The Clash	United Kingdom	1979		18 (1989), 28 (1990), 97 (1991)
74	Lithium	Nirvana	United States	1991		3 (1991), 45 (1998)
75	Good Riddance (Time of Your Life)	Green Day	United States	1997	84 (1998)	
76	Fools Gold	The Stone Roses	United Kingdom	1989		6 (1990), 7 (1991), 39 (1998)
77	Hearts a Mess	Gotye	Australia	2006	8	
78	Today	The Smashing Pumpkins	United States	1993	25 (1994)	40 (1998)
79	Life on Mars?	David Bowie	United Kingdom	1971		
80	Paint It, Black	The Rolling Stones	United Kingdom	1966		
81	Common People	Pulp	United Kingdom	1995	38	
82	Chop Suey!	System of a Down	United States	2001	3	
83	Every You Every Me	Placebo	United Kingdom	1998	5 (1999)	
84	No Woman, No Cry	Bob Marley & The Wailers	Jamaica	1974		
85	Bohemian Like You	The Dandy Warhols	United States	2000	10	
86	Come Together	The Beatles	United Kingdom	1969		
87	Yellow	Coldplay	United Kingdom	2000	5	
88	Gimme Shelter	The Rolling Stones	United Kingdom	1969		
89	Bulls on Parade	Rage Against the Machine	United States	1996	46	
90	**Sex on Fire**	**Kings of Leon**	**United States**	**2008**	**1**	
91	Back in Black	AC/DC	Australia	1980		
92	Skinny Love	Bon Iver	United States	2007	21 (2008)	
93	Unfinished Sympathy	Massive Attack	United Kingdom	1991		64 (1991), 34 (1998)
94	Float On	Modest Mouse	United States	2004	11	
95	Superstition	Stevie Wonder	United States	1972		
96	One More Time	Daft Punk	France	2000	61 (2001)	
97	Beds Are Burning	Midnight Oil	Australia	1987		
98	Kashmir	Led Zeppelin	United Kingdom	1975		63 (1998)
99	Wolf Like Me	TV on the Radio	United States	2006	63	
100	**Take Me Out**	**Franz Ferdinand**	**United Kingdom**	**2004**	**1**	

== Statistics ==
=== Artists with multiple entries ===
#	Artist	Tracks
5	Dave Grohl (Note: Three tracks with Nirvana (1, 40, 74), once with the Foo Fighters (9), once with Queens of the Stone Age (45))	1, 9, 40, 45, 74
4	Jeff Buckley	3, 7, 56, 69
4	Radiohead	5, 13, 15, 28
4	John Lennon (Note: Once solo (11), three tracks with The Beatles (35, 51, 78))	11, 24, 44, 86
3	Nirvana	1, 40, 74
3	The Beatles	24, 44, 86
3	The Smashing Pumpkins	35, 51, 78
2	Rage Against the Machine	2, 89
2	Peter Hook (Note: Once with Joy Division (4), once with New Order (32))	4, 32
2	Stephen Morris	4, 32
2	Bernard Sumner	4, 32
2	Led Zeppelin	10, 98
2	Pink Floyd	16, 53
2	Metallica	19, 31
2	Powderfinger	21, 27
2	Massive Attack	22, 93
2	Pearl Jam	25, 39
2	Michael Jackson	26, 41
2	Tool	37, 57
2	Daft Punk	58, 96
2	AC/DC	63, 91
2	The Rolling Stones	80, 88

=== Countries represented ===
Country	Count
United States	46
United Kingdom	36
Australia	16
France	2
Jamaica	1

=== Songs by decade ===
Decade	Song Count
1960s	8
1970s	11
1980s	16
1990s	43
2000s	22

=== Records ===
- News of Michael Jackson's death surfaced during the final week of voting. Triple J announcers pointed out that both "Thriller" and "Billie Jean" were already polling enough votes to feature in the top 100, but that the final week of voting pushed both songs further up the list.
- This is the first Hottest 100 of All Time where The Cure did not achieve more than one track. This is also the first time where The Cure did not have the most songs in a Hottest 100 Of All Time.
- This is the first Hottest 100 of All Time where R.E.M. did not achieve any tracks. In all other years, they had achieved at least two.
- Only one vote separated "No One Knows" by Queens of the Stone Age from "Hey Jude" by The Beatles.
- Radiohead swapped the number 5 and 13 positions they had held in the 1998 Of All Time countdown with "Creep" and "Paranoid Android".
- Franz Ferdinand are the second band behind Powderfinger to come 1st and 100th in a Hottest 100. "Take Me Out" is also the first song in the Hottest 100 to have reached both ends of the countdown.
- This is the first Hottest 100 of All Time countdown to not feature any songs from the year of the countdown.
- This countdown also is the first to not feature any Australian artists in the Top 10. The highest Australian entry was #17, a record low in any Hottest 100.
- With sixteen entries coming from Australian artists, the 2009 Of All Time list equals the record set in the 1990 Of All Time countdown for the fewest entries from Australian artists in a countdown.
- It was announced at the beginning of the countdown that #101 was "Heart Shaped Box" by Nirvana. This is the first known instance where the same artist held both the 1st and 101st positions in a Hottest 100.
- Only two songs in the entire Hottest 100 featured a female lead vocalist: Shara Nelson and Elizabeth Fraser, both of whom were guest vocalists on songs by Massive Attack ("Unfinished Sympathy" and "Teardrop" respectively). As such, there were no female artists or bands with permanent female vocalists who reached the countdown.
  - Overall, six bands with songs on the countdown included female instrumentalists. These were The Dandy Warhols, New Order, Pixies, Pulp, The Smashing Pumpkins and The White Stripes, accounting for eight songs between them, the only other songs which featured contributions from a female musician were "Wolf Like Me" by TV on the Radio, which featured backing vocals from musician Katrina Ford, and "Gimme Shelter" by The Rolling Stones, which featured backing vocals from singer Merry Clayton.

== CD release ==
Triple J released a compilation disc including 36 of the tracks.

CD 1
1. Nirvana – "Smells Like Teen Spirit" (#1)
2. Radiohead – "Paranoid Android" (#5)
3. Muse – "Knights of Cydonia" (#18)
4. Hilltop Hoods – "The Nosebleed Section" (#17)
5. Daft Punk – "Around the World" (#58)
6. Joy Division – "Love Will Tear Us Apart" (#4)
7. Oasis – "Wonderwall" (#12)
8. Faith No More – "Epic" (#46)
9. The Living End – "Prisoner of Society" (#34)
10. The John Butler Trio – "Betterman" (#47)
11. Pixies – "Where Is My Mind?" (#29)
12. Massive Attack – "Teardrop" (#22)
13. The Stone Roses – "Fools Gold (#76)
14. Violent Femmes – "Blister in the Sun" (#64)
15. The White Stripes – "Seven Nation Army" (#20)
16. Powderfinger – "These Days" (#21)
17. David Bowie – "Life on Mars?" (#79)
18. Augie March – "One Crowded Hour" (#59)
CD 2
1. Rage Against the Machine – "Killing in the Name" (#2)
2. Bloc Party – "Banquet" (#42)
3. New Order – "Blue Monday" (#32)
4. Queens of the Stone Age – "No One Knows" (#45)
5. You Am I – "Berlin Chair" (#52)
6. The Killers – "Mr. Brightside" (#38)
7. The Shins – "New Slang" (#72)
8. The Beach Boys – "God Only Knows" (#43)
9. The Cure – "Close to Me" (#54)
10. Franz Ferdinand– "Take Me Out" (#100)
11. The Prodigy – "Breathe" (#70)
12. Midnight Oil – "Beds Are Burning" (#97)
13. Gotye – "Hearts a Mess" (#77)
14. Nick Cave & The Bad Seeds – "Into My Arms" (#36)
15. Silverchair – "Tomorrow" (#33)
16. Pulp – "Common People" (#81)
17. Hunters & Collectors – "Throw Your Arms Around Me" (#23)
18. Jeff Buckley – "Hallelujah" (#3)

DVD

1. Radiohead – "Paranoid Android" (#5)
2. Rage Against the Machine – "Killing in the Name" (#2)
3. Muse – "Knights of Cydonia" (#18)
4. Jeff Buckley – "Hallelujah" (#3)
5. Joy Division – "Love Will Tear Us Apart" (#4)
6. Oasis – "Wonderwall" (#12)
7. Hilltop Hoods – "The Nosebleed Section" (#17)
8. The White Stripes – "Seven Nation Army" (#20)
9. Massive Attack – "Teardrop" (#22)
10. Powderfinger – "My Happiness" (#27)
11. Hunters & Collectors – "Throw Your Arms Around Me" (#23)
12. New Order – "Blue Monday" (#32)
13. The Killers – "Mr. Brightside" (#38)
14. The Living End – "Prisoner of Society" (#34)
15. Silverchair – "Tomorrow" (#33)
16. Nick Cave & The Bad Seeds – "Into My Arms" (#36)
17. Bloc Party – "Banquet" (#42)
18. Faith No More – "Epic" (#46)
19. You Am I – "Berlin Chair" (#52)
20. The John Butler Trio – "Betterman" (#47)
21. The Cure – "Close to Me" (#54)
22. Augie March – "One Crowded Hour" (#59)
23. Violent Femmes – "Blister in the Sun" (#64)
24. Blink-182 – "Dammit (Growing Up)" (#68)
25. The Prodigy – "Breathe" (#70)
26. The Stone Roses – "Fools Gold (#76)
27. The Shins – "New Slang" (#72)
28. Ben Folds Five – "Brick" (#67)
29. Gotye – "Hearts a Mess" (#77)
30. David Bowie – "Life on Mars?" (#79)
31. Pulp – "Common People" (#81)
32. The Dandy Warhols – "Bohemian Like You" (#85)
33. System of a Down – "Chop Suey!" (#82)
34. Modest Mouse – "Float On" (#94)
35. Coldplay – "Yellow" (#87)
36. TV On The Radio – "Wolf Like Me" (#99)
37. Midnight Oil – "Beds Are Burning" (#97)
38. Franz Ferdinand– "Take Me Out" (#100)
39. Radiohead – "Fake Plastic Trees" (#28)
