= Outline (Australian band) =

Australian rock, jazz band

- Origin: Sydney, Australia
- Genres: Rock, jazz (early), new wave, post-punk
- Years active: 1979–1982
- Label: Powderworks
- Past members: Mark Azzopardi; Harry Ladamatos; Alex Lakajev; Mike Mead; Phil Rigger; John Sammers; Jeff Barrett; Dale Ryan; Danny Damjanovic; Chris Ford; Michael Gray; Garry Macdonald

Outline were an Australian rock band formed in 1979. Founding mainstays were Phil Rigger on lead vocals and trumpet and John Sammers on guitar and vocals. They issued a studio album, Maybe It's a Game (1982), before disbanding at the end of that year. Their most popular track, "The Cicada (That Ate Five Dock)", was listed on national youth radio listeners' poll, Triple J Hottest 100, 1989.

== History ==
Outline were formed in 1979 in Sydney by Mark Azzopardi on drums, Harry Ladamatos on bass guitar, Alex Lakajev on keyboards, Mike Mead on trombone and vocals, Phil Rigger on lead vocals and trumpet (ex-Skintight) and John Sammers on guitar and vocals. Initially the group performed jazz, rock cover versions and Frank Zappa-themed works before adopting contemporary new wave material.

Azzopardi was replaced on drums by Dale Ryan and Ladamatos was replaced on bass by Jeff Barrett in early 1980. The group released their debut single, "Cities", in July, which was co-written by Lakajev, Rigger and Sammers. They undertook an Australian tour. In August they began recording their debut album, Maybe It's a Game, with Todd Hunter and Spencer Lee producing for Powderworks. Jonathan Green of The Canberra Times described their performance in November 1980, despite "$50,000 worth of equipment on stage and the music they are playing at the moment just isn't worth it... just too derivative". Green felt they were poor imitators of Mi-Sex and Midnight Oil and Outline's "songs dissolved into a chaotic jumble."

During 1981 Outline issued three singles, "The Cicada (That Ate Five Dock)" (April), "How Can I Get Out of Here?" (August) and "Maybe It's a Game" (October). The former was written by Sammers. Also in October they supported visiting English rock band Gillan on the Australian leg of Future Shock's promotional tour. Both "The Cicada (That Ate Five Dock)" and "Maybe It's a Game" were broadcast on ABC-TV's pop music show, Countdown.

Mead was replaced by Danny Damjanovic on saxophone (ex-Jimmy and the Boys) in early 1982. Outline members Rigger, Ryan and Sammers were joined, in mid-year, by Chris Ford on bass guitar (ex-Flex) and Michael Gray on keyboards (ex-Jeff St John's Asylum). Maybe It's a Game was released in August 1982 but "[it] was not the commercial breakthrough expected". They issued their final single, "Stay with Me", in October before disbanding at the end of that year. "The Cicada (That Ate Five Dock)" was listed at No. 99 on national youth radio Triple J's listeners' poll of the best songs of all time in 1989. It was included on a compilation album by various artists, Somewhere in Sydney – 30 songs from the Harbour City (2000), curated by Glenn A. Baker.

== Members ==
- Mark Azzopardi – drums
- Harry Ladamatos – bass guitar
- Alex Lakajev – keyboards
- Mike Mead – trombone, vocals
- Phil Rigger – lead vocals, trumpet
- John Sammers – guitar, vocals
- Jeff Barrett – bass guitar
- Dale Ryan – drums
- Danny Damjanovic – saxophone
- Chris Ford – bass guitar
- Garry Macdonald – bass guitar
- Michael Gray – keyboards

== Discography ==
=== Albums ===
- Maybe It's a Game (August 1982) – Powderworks (POW 6000)

=== Extended plays ===
- EE-EE-EE-EE-EP (1981) – Powderworks (POWT2001)

=== Singles ===
- "Cities" (1980) – Powderworks
- "The Cicada (That Ate Five Dock)" (1981) – Powderworks
- "How Can I Get Out?" (1981) – Powderworks
- "Maybe It's a Game" (1981) – Powderworks
- "Stay with Me" (1982) – Powderworks
