= Talking to a Stranger (song) =

1982 single by Hunters & Collectors

Single by Hunters & Collectors

from the album Hunters & Collectors
- A-side: "Talking to a Stranger (Michael's Version)"
- B-side: "Talking to a Stranger (Our Version)"
- Released: 12 July 1982
- Recorded: AAV
- Genre: Post-punk, art rock
- Length: 4:39 (Michael's Version)
- Label: Mushroom
- Songwriters: Mark Seymour, John Archer, Geoff Crosby, Doug Falconer, Robert Miles, Greg Perano, Ray Tosti-Guerra
- Producers: Hunters & Collectors

Hunters & Collectors singles chronology
"World of Stone" (1982)	"Talking to a Stranger" (1982)	"Lumps of Lead" (1982)

"Talking to a Stranger" is the debut single of Australian rock band Hunters & Collectors, released in 1982. The only single from the band's self-titled debut album, it was accompanied by a music video directed by Richard Lowenstein. The song reached number 59 on the Australian chart.

A remix of the song, "Stalking to a Stranger", was released by the Avalanches in 2013.

== Background ==
"Talking to a Stranger" was co-written by band members John Archer on bass guitar, Doug Falconer on drums, Ray Tosti-Guerra on guitar and vocals, Robert Miles on live sound, Mark Seymour on lead vocals and guitar, Greg Perano on percussion, and Geoff Crosby on keyboards. The band debuted the song live at Melbourne's Crystal Ballroom venue on 15 May 1981. Recording took place at Richmond Recorders in October 1981, with Tony Cohen, sound engineer for The Birthday Party. He considered Hunters & Collectors' sound and approach to recording innovative, saying:

I always make an effort to separate instruments, ... but for Hunters & Collectors it was impossible. There were so many members, I couldn't find space to isolate them all. There were brass players, jokers hitting tin cans. Random people just seemed to get up and play things.

The single was released on 12 July 1982, ahead of the band's debut studio album, Hunters & Collectors, which appeared later that month.

== Music video ==
The music video for the song was directed by Richard Lowenstein and shot mainly in St Kilda, Melbourne. Thematically abstract, It has been described as ground-breaking and "completely unique" due to Lowenstein's use of various in-camera effects and cinematic techniques, as well as the video's allusions to Australian and European cinema, including the post-apocalyptic aesthetic of Mad Max 2 (1981).

It was one of the first music videos championed on America's MTV channel, and featured in the debut episode of its program The Cutting Edge, broadcast in March 1983. According to Lowenstein, "The band were seriously arty, none of them wanted to make a commercial video. Ironically it became a commercial video because it got so much attention".

== Reception and legacy ==
According to Rock Express, "Talking to a Stranger" exemplified the band's "abrasive brand of industrial funk". Some European critics incorrectly assumed that its "raw pulsating sound" was derived from Indigenous Australian music.

At the 1982 Countdown Music Awards, the song was nominated for Best Debut Single.

"Talking to a Stranger" was voted 8th in the Triple J Hottest 100, 1989, as well as charting the next two years in the 1990 and 1991 countdowns.

In 1992, Filthy Lucre remixed the song and it peaked at number 141 on the ARIA charts.

In 2021, Double J ranked "Talking to a Stranger" as the 35th best debut single of all time, writing that it "[followed] in the footsteps of Germany's Krautrock pioneers": "With huge horns and metallic percussion, Hunters & Collectors showed few signs of emerging beyond Melbourne's underground. ... It was a seven-and-a-half-minute epic with jagged guitars, a thundering rhythm, a barking vocal, and an opening line nicked from Charles Baudelaire."

The song featured in the 1984 American horror film Disconnected and the 1986 Australian dystopian action film Dead End Drive-In. It was covered by Birds of Tokyo and remixed by fellow Melbourne group the Avalanches under the title "Stalking to a Stranger".

== Track listing ==
7" version
No.	Title	Writer(s)	Length
1.	"Talking to a Stranger (Michael's Version)"	Mark Seymour, John Archer, Geoff Crosby, Doug Falconer, Robert Miles, Greg Perano, Ray Tosti-Guerra	4:39
2.	"Talking to a Stranger (Our Version)"	Mark Seymour, John Archer, Geoff Crosby, Doug Falconer, Robert Miles, Greg Perano, Ray Tosti-Guerra	7:18

== Personnel ==
Hunters & Collectors members

- John Archer – electric bass
- Geoff Crosby – keyboards
- Doug Falconer – drums
- Robert Miles – live sound, art director
- Greg Perano – percussion
- Mark Seymour – guitar, lead vocals
- Ray Tosti-Guerra – guitar, vocals

== Charts ==
Chart (1982)	Peak position
Australia (Kent Music Report)	59
