= 4ZZZ Hot 100 =

Australian annual music countdown

- Logo used in 2025
- Awarded for: The year's top 100 songs as voted by listeners
- Date: 1 January
- Country: Australia
- Presented by: 4ZZZ
- First award: 1 January 1977; 49 years ago
- Currently held by: Mitch, Please – "All the Rage" (2025)

Highlights
- Most wins: The Flangipanis (5 wins)
- Website: 4zzz.org.au/hot100

The Hot 100 is an annual music poll presented by Brisbane community radio station 4ZZZ since 1977. Listeners vote on their favourite songs of the year online, and tune into the countdown on New Year's Day. "All the Rage" by Brisbane band Mitch, Please is the latest song to top the countdown.

== History ==
4ZZZ broadcast the first Hot 100 in 1977. The idea was raised in the station's subscriber magazine Radio Times, which outlined that whoever submitted a list of 100 songs closest to the station's chosen list of its favourite 100 songs would win a prize of five records.

The 4ZZZ Hot 100 partially inspired the Australian national youth broadcaster Triple J to begin its own Hottest 100 countdown from 1989. When former 4ZZZ presenter Andy Nehl moved to Triple J, he pitched the idea of an annual countdown to the station, which had not yet expanded to Brisbane. When Triple J expanded nationally and started running its own Hot 100, 4ZZZ accused Triple J of copying its intellectual property. The national broadcaster eventually renamed its countdown to the Hottest 100.

To celebrate 50 years of 4ZZZ, the 2025 Hot 100 was held on 7 December instead of New Year's Day, as this was the broadcast date of the first Hot 100.

== Voting ==
Each year the 4ZZZ counts down songs from the previous year. The station usually provides a shortlist on 1 December, but listeners can vote for any song released in the eligible timeframe.

== List of winners ==
Adapted from the 4ZZZ Hot 100 Archive.

List of songs voted number one in the 4ZZZ Hot 100
Year	Artist	Song
1976	The Beach Boys	Good Vibrations
1980	Sex Pistols	Anarchy in the UK
1982	The Clash	London Calling
1983	Joy Division	Love Will Tear Us Apart
1984	President's XI	Summer Vacation
1985	Echo & The Bunnymen	The Cutter
1986	The Cult	She Sells Sanctuary
1987	Painters and Dockers	Die Yuppie Die
1988	The Primitives	Crash
1989	Dinosaur Jr.	Freak Scene
1990	Sonic Youth	Kool Thing
1991	Chopper Division	Chill Out America
1992	Ministry	Jesus Built My Hotrod
1993	The Breeders	Cannonball
1994	Beastie Boys	Sabotage
1995	Wishing Chair	Dreaming
1996	Escape From Toytown	Fish n Chip Bitch From Ipswich
1997	Blur	Song 2
1998	Not from There	Sich Offnen
1999	Regurgitator	I Wanna Be a Nudist
2000	The Dandy Warhols	Bohemian Like You
2001	Gazoonga Attack	Cinderella
2002	The White Stripes	Fell in Love with a Girl
2003	Dollar Bar	Cute Gurls Have the Best Diseases
2004	Dick Nasty	I'm More Australian Than A Book of Bush Poetry by Russell Crowe
2005	The Disables	ASIO
2006	Texas Tea	Macy and Me
2007	Texas Tea	Whiskey and Wine
2008	The Emu Smugglers	Born and Bred (On Triple Zed)
2009	I Heart Hiroshima	Shakeytown
2010	Transvaal Diamond Syndicate	HomeAlbums
2011	Gotye featuring Kimbra	Somebody That I Used to Know
2012	Velociraptor	Cynthia
2013	The Flangipanis	I'm Drunk, So What, Fuck You
2014	Violent Soho	Saramona Said
2015	The Flangipanis	Getting Shit For Free
2016	The Flangipanis	Double Standards
2017	The Flangipanis	Sportsball
2018	Waax	Labrador
2019	Goatzilla	Dropbear (The Legend of)
2020	The Flangipanis	Asshole Aunt
2021	Waax	Most Hated Girl
2022	Square Tugs featuring Polly Cooke	I Don't Like It
2023	Square Tugs	One Minute Love Song
2024	Amyl and the Sniffers	U Should Not Be Doing That
2025	Mitch, Please	All The Rage
