= 4ZZZ =

- Brisbane, Queensland; Australia
- Broadcast area: Brisbane RA1 ()
- Frequencies: 102.1 MHz and DAB+

Programming
- Language: English
- Format: Community radio

Ownership
- Owner: Creative Broadcasters Ltd

History
- First air date: 8 December 1975
- Former call signs: 4ZZ-FM (1975–1976)

Technical information
- Licensing authority: ACMA
- ERP: 12,000 watts
- HAAT: 233 m
- Transmitter coordinates: 27°27′47″S 152°56′49″E

Links
- Public licence information: Profile
- Website: www.4zzz.org.au

4ZZZ (pronounced "Four Triple Zed" or simply "Triple Zed") is an independent community radio station operating in Brisbane, Australia at the frequency 102.1 FM. As a community radio station, 4ZZZ is a member of the Community Broadcasting Association of Australia (CBAA). The station broadcasts to much of South East Queensland, parts of northern New South Wales and web streams from its website.

== History ==
In the 1970s, activists in Queensland were pivotal in establishing Australian community radio amidst a conservative political climate. The University of Queensland Student Union was one of 12 groups given licences by Moss Cass in 1975, right before the dismissal of prime minister Gough Whitlam, which nearly caused the entire project to be cancelled due to the political record of station personnel. 4ZZZ, originally given the call sign 4ZZ-FM, launched on 8 December 1975 as Australia's first community station and aimed to provide a radical alternative to mainstream news, promote community engagement and activism, and support Australian music. The station was the first FM station in Brisbane. The call sign was changed to 4ZZZ in 1976 when Australia changed its conventions on FM radio call signs to contain three letters instead of two as on AM.

On 30 November 1978, the transmitter moved from the University of Queensland student union building to Mount Coot-tha when the station was granted a full licence. At this time, the frequency changed from 105.7 MHz to 102.1 MHz. That same year, the station debuted specialty programming for the gay community, among the longest-running in Australia by 2015.

4ZZZ pushed the boundaries by broadcasting illegal obscenities. In 1981 an organisation called "The Society to Outlaw Pornography" reported them to the Australian Broadcasting Authority. 4ZZZ successfully defended themselves, leading to changes which make it legal to swear on Australian TV and radio under certain circumstances.

On 14 December 1988, as part of a conservative backlash to the ousting of Queensland Premier Joh Bjelke-Petersen, 4ZZZ was forced off the air and evicted from its premises at the University of Queensland by the then UQ Union, ALSF and Young Nationals student union executive, led by Victoria Brazil. The incident prompted hundreds of supporters to rally around the station; after a second eviction attempt failed, 4ZZZ voluntarily moved out in 1989. The station moved to new premises on Coronation Drive in Toowong, and in 1994 the station moved to its current location on Barry Parade in Fortitude Valley.

== Hot 100 ==
The 4ZZZ Hot 100 is an annual music poll presented by the station since 1977. It counts down listeners' favourite 100 songs on New Year's Day. The event inspired national youth broadcaster Triple J to begin their own Hottest 100 from 1989.

== Notable former presenters ==
- Tony Biggs

== Awards ==
=== Awards ===
Year	Nominee / work	Award	Result (wins only)	Ref.
2026	4ZZZ	Queensland Music Awards Lifetime Achievement Award	awarded	
