= Reptile (song) =

Single by The Church

from the album Starfish
- Released: 1988
- Genre: College rock; psychedelic pop
- Length: 4:56
- Label: Arista Records
- Songwriter(s): Marty Willson-Piper / Peter Koppes / Richard Ploog / Steve Kilbey
- Producer(s): Greg Ladanyi, Waddy Wachtel, The Church

The Church singles chronology
"Under the Milky Way" (1988)	"Reptile" (1988)	"Antenna" (1988)

Music video
- Reptile on YouTube

"Reptile" is a song by Australian alternative rock band The Church. It was released as a single from their 1988 album Starfish, and the songwriting credits are given to all four members of the band.

Inspired by a real-life encounter with a reptile, "Reptile" is based around a prominent guitar riff. The song saw moderate commercial success as a single and has become one of the band's most famous songs.

== Background and composition ==
Marty Willson-Piper, Peter Koppes, Richard Ploog, and Steve Kilbey were all credited with writing the song. In the sleevenotes for the 2010 CD reissue of Starfish, Willson-Piper described the process; "sometimes a song can be mainly one person's idea augmented by everyone else. Other times a song really is the sum of the parts working magically together. This was the case with ‘Reptile’".

Sung by Kilbey, the song features lyrics inspired by an encounter Kilbey had after going with a woman to her hotel room. Kilbey explained, "I went home with this woman one night I met in Canters Deli. I went in the bathroom ... and there was a sound behind the shower curtain. I look behind the shower curtain and there was a great big ... lizard in there, looking at me. ... And the woman goes, 'Oh, you met Bruford' or whatever his ... name was. ... I guess that had something to do with it".

Musically, the song, as Stewart Mason of AllMusic described, is based on a "nagging stop-start guitar riff that continues, almost unchanged, throughout the entire song, building a palpable tension through the verses that is only partially alleviated by Steve Kilbey's sneering chorus". Using one unchanging riff while the rest of the song moves around it was a device The Church had used in several earlier songs, such as "One Day" from 1983's Seance. Willson-Piper recalled, "I wrote the riff in a rehearsal room somewhere in Sydney; it just fell out of my guitar like a diamond".

Mason continues, "The rattling rhythm section only adds to the effect, with Richard Ploog's kinetic hi-hat work driving the beat". Kilbey said, "I think 'Reptile' did something we never quite managed to do again, and that is the way the parts all play against each other. Like the Church has always been a band where its not everything just doing the same thing at the same time. Everything's working like a machine. I think that was the best ever example of that".

== Release history ==
"Reptile" was released as a single in the US, Canada and Australia.

The US 7" had two tracks on the B-side, "Under the Milky Way (Acoustic Version)", and "Tantalized" in a 3:58 edit from the version on Heyday. A US cassette single, playing all three tacks on both sides, was also released. The same tracks appeared on the Canadian 7" release.

In Australia, the 7" release on Mushroom Records featured "Texas Moon" on the B-side, and was issued in both black vinyl and limited edition green vinyl formats.

Additionally, there was a promotional US 7" released, featuring the album version and a 3:56 edit., and a promotional US 12" featuring a 4:44 "Reptile (Rock Radio Remix)" on both sides.

== Reception ==
"Reptile" peaked at number 27 on the U.S. Hot Mainstream Rock Tracks chart in 1988. The song was well received by critics upon its release. Ned Raggett of AllMusic compared it to "the sheer punch of Heyday's most frenetic moments with a slightly more restrained but still strong, smart performance." The chorus was "rushing", the guitars were "epic" and "melancholic", and the atmosphere was set by "a sudden mid-song slow dive bomb break, guitars howling down into the void."

== Personnel ==
- Steve Kilbey – vocals, bass, keyboards
- Marty Willson-Piper – guitar
- Peter Koppes – guitar
- Richard Ploog – drums, percussion

== Chart performance ==
Chart (1988)	Peak position
Australia (ARIA)	94
U.S. Billboard Hot Mainstream Rock Tracks Chart	27
