= Uncertain Smile =

1982 and 1983 single by The The

Single by the The

from the album Soul Mining
- B-side: "Three Orange Kisses from Kazan"; "Waitin' for the Upturn"
- Released: October 1982; November 1983
- Recorded: 1982, 1983
- Studio: Mediasound Studios (New York) – (1982 version); Advision and Sarm West (London) – (1983 version)
- Genre: Synth-pop
- Length: 4:55 (original 7" version); 9:59 (original 12" version); 6:49 (1983 version)
- Label: Epic; Some Bizzare
- Songwriter: Matt Johnson
- Producers: Mike Thorne (1982 version); Paul Hardiman and Matt Johnson (1983 version)

The The singles chronology
"Cold Spell Ahead" (1981)	"Uncertain Smile" (1982)	"Perfect" (1983)

Music video
- "Uncertain Smile" on YouTube

"Uncertain Smile" is a song by the English rock band the The. It was first released as a single in October 1982 before being re-recorded for the band's debut studio album Soul Mining. That version was re-released as a single in November 1983. The album version of the song is known for its extended piano outro, played by former Squeeze keyboardist Jools Holland.

The song was the band's first charting song, reaching No. 68 on the UK singles chart and No. 43 in Australia. Upon its re-release in 1983, it reached No. 31 in the Netherlands.

== Background ==
In its earliest stages, the song was titled "Cold Spell Ahead" while in its demo phase. Stevo Pearce, the owner of Some Bizzare Records, told bandleader Matt Johnson to keep reworking it so that it could become a single. It impressed London Recordings, and Pearce convinced the label to give Johnson an all-expenses paid trip to New York City in order to record the song in studio. Johnson, who felt that London was not friendly to him, ended up signing with CBS Records instead after Pearce reneged on his handshake agreement with London and initiated a bidding war on the strength of "Uncertain Smile".

The first version of "Uncertain Smile" differed from the "Cold Spell Ahead" demo by adding a Roland TR-808 drum machine beat, a bassline played by Johnson on a Fender Precision, lead and rhythm guitar leads on a 12-string Rickenbacker, and a xylimba which Johnson had purchased from Manny's Music on Midtown Manhattan's West 48th Street. String samples came from record producer Mike Thorne's Synclavier, and session musician Crispin Cioe of the Uptown Horns played saxophone and flute.

The album version of "Uncertain Smile" maintains the xylimba intro but replaces Cioe's saxophone solo with a piano solo played by Jools Holland. Johnson said of Holland's performance:

"It was a sweltering summer's day and he turned up in full leathers on his vintage Norton bike so he wasn't cool, he was sweltering somewhat. But he was very humble, very low key, very nice person. It was recorded on a nice piano and I still own it. It's a Yamaha C3 baby grand and it was in a really good live room. Someone asked me why I chose to put a piano solo on that song and it was simply because we had such a nice sounding piano in such a nice sounding room."

== Critical reception ==
"Uncertain Smile" received very positive reviews from contemporary critics. Smash Hits gave it top honors and declared, "Never mind record of the week, this is the week of the the The record... [Johnson's] sleazy Lou Reed vocals contrast beautifully with a bubbling melange of smoochy synthetics, around which a delicate, folksy flute flutters from time to time." Noise Magazine called it "one of the best dance records to come out of this country for a long time." Sounds described it as a "hypnotic recording that hooks deeper into you with its casual intrusiveness the more you hear it." However, Record Mirror criticised it for being "long and drawn out."

In the Netherlands, where the song was a top 40 hit, "Uncertain Smile" has placed on the country's annual Top 2000 songs of all time countdown regularly. It reached its highest position of No. 396 in 2000 and has made the list every year since 2005.

"Uncertain Smile" ranked in third place during Australia's inaugural Triple J Hottest 100 songs of all time poll in 1989. It ranked fourth in 1990 and 13th in 1991.

== Chart performance ==
=== Original 1982 version ===
Chart (1982)	Peak position
Australia (Kent Music Report)	43
UK Singles (Official Charts)	68

=== Re-recorded 1983 version ===
Chart (1983–84)	Peak position
Netherlands (Dutch Top 40)	31
Netherlands (Single Top 100)	31
UK Singles (Official Charts)	100
