= Pink Champagne =

Swedish feminist punk band

Pink Champagne (first named Kasern 9) was a Swedish feminist punk band in the 1980s. It consisted of four women, Stina Berge (drums), Ann Carlberger (vocals), Karin Jansson (guitar) and Gunilla Welin (bass). Kajsa Grytt was briefly a member. They released two full-length albums, Vackra pojke! (Beautiful Boy!, 1981) and Kärlek eller ingenting (Love or Nothing, 1983), before breaking up in 1984.

Karin Jansson and Ann Carlberger went to Australia in 1987. Jansson dated and became the domestic partner of Steve Kilbey of The Church and co-wrote their hit song "Under the Milky Way". With Kilbey, she became mother to twin daughters Elektra and Miranda (born 1991 in Sydney) who now perform as Say Lou Lou. Jansson and Kilbey also formed the band Curious (Yellow) on Red Eye Records. Jansson now runs a yoga studio in Stockholm, writes poetry and music.

Carlberger is married and has a son and a daughter. She is the manager of the Science Fiction Bookstore in Gamla Stan in Stockholm.

Stina Berge started writing children's books and released a solo album in 2008. Kajsa Grytt became a leading member of Tant Strul.

The albums were released under the MNW label.

== See also ==
- Tant Strul
