= Red Eye Records =

Red Eye Records may refer to:

- Red Eye Records (label), an independent record label started in 1985
- Red Eye Records (store), an independent record store in Sydney, Australia

== See also ==
- Redeye Distribution, an American record label
