= List of songs about Sydney =

This is a list of songs that mention or are about Sydney, the capital city of New South Wales, Australia, as well as the suburbs of Sydney.

== Song listings ==
The list is ordered alphabetically by suburb and within suburb alphabetically by song title. Where known, the songwriters, performing artists and album or CD on which the track has appeared are listed. Some of the tracks listed appear on the Sony Music 2000 double-compilation CD Somewhere in Sydney – 30 songs from the Harbour City, which was compiled and conceived by Glenn A. Baker.

=== Annandale ===
- "Booth Street" Youth Group

=== Balmain ===
- "Any Day Above Ground" James Reyne
- "Darling St." Spit Syndicate
- "The Four Corners of the Earth" Weddings Parties Anything
- "Guess How Much I Love You" The Lucksmiths

=== Bankstown ===
- "Bankstown Airport" Toby Martin

=== Bellevue Hill ===
- "Somewhere in Sydney" (Greg Macainsh) Skyhooks

=== Beverly Hills ===
- "Naomi Campbell" 360

=== Blacktown ===
- "Blacktown" Fitzy & Wippa
- "Blacktown" Miracle
- "Blacktown" The Numbers
- "Blacktown Boogie" (Marc Hunter, Robert M. Taylor, Todd Hunter) Dragon
- "Blacktown to Bondi" Mental as Anything
- "Sunnyholt" Perry Keyes

=== Bondi ===
- "A Brief History" the Waifs
- "Blacktown to Bondi" Mental as Anything
- "Bondi" (Elliott Weston) Elliott Weston
- "Bondi" Cog
- "Bondi '98" Dick Diver
- "Bondi Pier" Grateful Dead
- "Bondi Road" Dragon
- "Chunder in the Old Pacific Sea" Barry Crocker
- "Fall of Rome" (James Reyne) James Reyne
- "I Will Not Go Quietly (Duffy's Song)" the Whitlams
- "Rainbow's Dead End" James Reyne
- "Section 5 (Bus to Bondi)" (Rotsey/Hirst/Garrett/Moginie) Midnight Oil
- "The Waitress" the Waifs
- "Trying To Sneeze" Ben Lee

=== Botany Bay ===
- "Botany Bay"
- "Brylcream, Alcohol & Pills" (Keyes) Perry Keyes
- "Jim Jones at Botany Bay"
- "To the Shores of Botany Bay" (Traditional arrangement The Bushwackers) The Bushwackers
- "The Fields of Athenry" Pete St John

=== Brighton-Le-Sands ===
- "Canada" Lazy Susan

=== Cabramatta ===
- "Cabramatta Sunrise" Dom Turner
- "I Hang Out with the Guys in Jet('s Uncle)" Root!

=== Camperdown ===
- "Australia Street" Sticky Fingers
- "Rose of Camperdown" (Fenton/Rumble) Holly

=== Campsie ===
- "HARDSTYLE" Shady Nasty

=== Centennial Park ===
- "Letter to Alan" (Don Walker) Cold Chisel

=== Chatswood ===
- "Bring on The Change" Midnight Oil
- "I Hang Out with the Guys in Jet('s Uncle)" Root!
- "I Wish Somebody Would Build A Bridge (So I Can Get Over Myself)" Thirsty Merc
- "Koala Sprint" (Garrett, Moginie, Rotsey) Midnight Oil

=== Chippendale ===
- "Strange Days in Chippendale" Richard Clapton

=== Circular Quay ===
- "And the Band Played Waltzing Matilda" (Eric Bogle) Eric Bogle "Now I'm Easy" (Larrikin Records).
- "If We Can't Get It Together" (Tim Rogers) You Am I Hourly Daily
- "Reckless" (James Reyne) Australian Crawl Semantics (EMI); Paul Kelly Hidden Things; James Reyne Electric Digger Dandy; John Farnham I Remember When I Was Young

=== Coogee ===
- "Coogee Boy" (Keyes) Perry Keyes
- "Mr Munroe" (Martin Plaza) Mental As Anything
- "Wedding Cake Island" Midnight Oil

=== Darlinghurst ===
- "Boundary Street" Cold Chisel
- "Darling It Hurts" (Paul Kelly, Steve Connelly) Paul Kelly and the Coloured Girls
- "Darlinghurst Confidential" The Celibate Rifles
- "Darlinghurst Nights" (Robert Forster) The Go-Betweens
- "Darlinghurst Road" (R. Thorpe, Noel Watson) Noel Watson
- "Taylor Square" (Mick Thomas) Weddings Parties Anything
- "Working Girls" Redgum

=== Drummoyne ===
- "The Cicada That Ate Five Dock" (John Sammers) Outline

=== Ermington ===
- "This Is Not My Town" (The Model School)

=== Erskineville ===
- "Bill from Erskineville" John Dengate
- "Erskineville" The Gadflys
- "Erskineville Nights" Youth Group
- "Sicilian Born" Graeme Connors
- "Siege of Union Street" Alistair Hulett
- "Someone's Dad" John Kennedy's 68 Comeback Special

=== Five Dock ===
- "The Cicada That Ate Five Dock" (John Sammers) Outline

=== Glebe ===
- "Harry Was a Bad Bugger" (Don Walker) Tex, Don and Charlie
- "Lauren from Glebe" Muscles
- "Purple Sneakers" You Am I Hi Fi Way
- "Ben Lee" Klinger

=== Hornsby ===
- "Houndog" (Don Walker) Cold Chisel
- "No Place Like Normanhurst" Kiff vs. Spliff

=== Kings Cross ===
- "At the Piccolo Bar" (Don Walker) Don Walker
- "Breakfast at Sweethearts" (Don Walker) Cold Chisel Album Breakfast at Sweethearts
- "Cars for King's Cross" the Moles
- "El Alamein Blues" (Don Walker) Catfish
- "From St Kilda to Kings Cross" (Paul Kelly) Paul Kelly And The Messengers
- "Have You Ever Been to see Kings Cross?" Frankie Davidson with the Sapphires.
- "Hidden Things" Paul Kelly
- "Girls on the Avenue" Richard Clapton
- "Kickin' On" The Fauves
- "Kings Cross" (Lance Ferguson) The Bamboos
- "Kings Cross Ladies" (Dave Tice/John Baxter) Buffalo
- "Knee Length Socks" Urthboy
- "Letter to Alan" (Don Walker) Cold Chisel
- "Manzil Madness" (Anderson/Wells) Rose Tattoo
- "Matilda No More" Kasey Chambers and Slim Dusty
- "Metho Blues" (Don Walker) Cold Chisel
- "Plaza" Cold Chisel
- "Queen of Everyone's Heart" (Keyes) Perry Keyes
- "The Mansions" (Don Walker) Cold Chisel
- "Young Girls" (Don Walker) Don Walker

=== Lambton ===
"Lambton Lights" Bob Corbett

=== Llandilo ===
- "Meth Labs and Daygos" 360

=== Lavender Bay ===
- "Long Jumping Jeweller (of Lavender Bay)"* (Glenn Shorrock) Little River Band

=== Leichhardt ===
- "Norton Street" *(Raoul Graf/Ed Kuepper) Raoul Graf

=== Manly ===
- "Coastal Kids" Bliss n Eso
- "Manly" Camperdown & Out
- "Misfits (Don Walker) Cold Chisel
- "Reckless" (James Reyne) Australian Crawl Semantics (EMI)

=== Maroubra ===
- "Coastal Kids" Bliss n Eso
- "Down on the Street with You" (Keyes) Perry Keyes
- "Stomping at Maroubra" Little Pattie

=== Marrickville ===
- "Miracle in Marrickville" John Kennedy's Love Gone Wrong Single Red Eye Records
- "River of Tears" (Kev Carmody) Kev Carmody, The Drones
- "Warren Rd" Custard
- "You sound like Louis Burdett" – The Whitlams

=== Matraville ===
- "Matraville Trees" Perry Keyes

=== McMahons Point ===
- "Blues Point Road" The Buoys

=== Mount Druitt ===
- "Home and Away" OneFour

=== Narrabeen ===
- "Surfin' U.S.A." The Beach Boys

=== Newtown ===
- "Exile on King St" Spurs For Jesus
- "Ghost of Newtown" John Kennedy
- "God Drinks at The Sando" The Whitlams
- "King St" *John Kennedy's Love Gone Wrong Single Red Eye Records
- "My Drug Buddy" The Lemonheads
- "Newtown Dreaming" *(Willoughby) Mixed Relations
- "Newtown (La La La)" Cuthbert and the Night Walkers
- "Peter Says (The Cat Protection Society Song)" John Kennedy
- "Rock'n'Roll Band and a Schooner of Beer" (H. Ree) McBodybag
- "The Newtown Song" [Annita Cullen, Laurie and the Toyboys]
- "12 Hours" The Whitlams
- "Year of the Rat" The Whitlams
- "Australia Street" Sticky Fingers

=== Normanhurst ===
"No Place Like Normanhurst" Kiff vs. Spliff

=== North Shore ===
- "North Shore Girls Get Off" (Dave Beniuk) David Beniuk
- "Somewhere in Sydney" (Greg Macainsh) Skyhooks

=== Paddington ===
- "Double on the Main Game" (Keyes) Perry Keyes
- "Oxford Street" (Dorian Mode) Dorian Mode
- "The Paddo Sharps" Celibate Rifles
- "Spanish Gardener" Mental As Anything
- "The Streets of Paddington" (Ralph Graham) Eureka! with Dave Swarbrick

=== Palm Beach ===
- "Deep Water" (Richard Clapton) Richard Clapton

=== Parramatta ===
- "Jack's Heroes" (Spider Stacy) The Pogues & The Dubliners
- "Oodnadatta Parramatta" Jim Conway
- "Parramatta Gaol 1843" Redgum
- "Parramatta Hot Rod Man" The Whiteliners, Satellite V, Gaitorbait
- "Sweeney" Slim Dusty
- "The Abattoir Sky" (Keyes) Perry Keyes
- "The Letter Home" (MacManus, Cassidy, Belton) Elvis Costello and The Brodsky Quartet
- "Tomorrow" (Don Walker) Cold Chisel
- "Two Cabs to the Toucan" (Sean Kelly, Andrew Duffield) Models

=== Petersham ===
- "See-Saw" Youth Group

=== Pyrmont ===
- "Who Can Stand in the Way" (Moginie, Garrett) Midnight Oil
- "What Sydney Looks Like in June" Alex the Astronaut

=== Quakers Hill ===
- “So Easy” Triple One, Matt Corby and thatboykwame

=== Randwick ===
- "Randwick Bells" (Paul Kelly) Paul Kelly and the Coloured Girls

=== Redfern ===
- "Ivy Street" (Tim O'Reilly) The Mexican Spitfires Lupe Velez EP Red Eye Records
- "The Day John Sattler Broke His Jaw" Perry Keyes The Last Ghost Train Home Album Laughing Outlaw – the song mentions several other Sydney suburbs
- "The Last Ghost Train Home" (Perry Keyes) Perry Keyes
- "Warakurna" Midnight Oil

=== Rockdale ===
- "Cold Heart (Take Me Down to Rockdale Plaza)" Custard
- "Fire in the Booth” Chillinit

=== Stanmore ===
- "The Battle of Stanmore" Died Pretty

=== St Peters ===
- "Duncan (Slim Dusty song)" Slim Dusty
- "St Peters" Camperdown & Out

=== Strathfield ===
- "Rookwood" (Stephen McCowage) The Mexican Spitfires Lupe Velez EP Red Eye Records

=== Strawberry Hills ===
- "Strawberry Hills Forever" John Kennedy

=== Summer Hill ===
- "Silver Bullets" Hot Rollers Polydor Records
- "Summer Hill Road" (R.Burton/G.Paige) The Executives Single Festival Records

=== Surry Hills ===
- "Green Ginger Wine" The Rumjacks
- "Incident on South Dowling" Paul Kelly

=== Sydney ===
- "A Tale of Two Cities" The Lucksmiths
- "A Reason for it All" Eric Bogle
- "Arrival at Sydney Harbour" Port Blue
- "Australia" (Ray Davies) the Kinks
- "Bradman" Paul Kelly
- "Bruce Went Down to Sydney" Col Elliott
- "The City Is Humming" 78 Saab
- "City of Lights"* (Grant McFarland) Grant McFarland
- "Diamantina Drover" (Hugh McDonald) Redgum
- "Don't Go to Sydney" (John Dowler, Mick Holmes) the Zimmermen
- "Fast Boat to Sydney" Johnny Cash
- "Found" Horrorshow
- "From Little Things Big Things Grow" Paul Kelly
- "From The Bush" Warumpi Band
- "Ghost Town" (Don Walker) Cold Chisel
- "Go Farther in Lightness" Gang of Youths
- "Harbour Town" Icehouse
- "He's on the Beach" Kirsty MacColl
- "Inland Sea" (Carus Thompson) Carus Thompson
- "The Inner West" David McCormack and the Polaroids Candy
- "I Wonder What They're Doing (in Sydney Today)" (Mick Thomas) Michael Thomas
- "I'll Be in Sydney Tonight" JR Williams
- "In the Valley" Midnight Oil
- "Khe Sanh" (Don Walker) Cold Chisel Atlantic records Single (April 1978)
- "Larrikin Town" *(Keith Glass) Keith Glass
- "Lights of Sydney Town" (Alistair Hulett) Roaring Jack
- "Liverpool Street" (Big Five) Big Five
- "Melbourne Vs Sydney" Dan Kelly
- "My City of Sydney" (Tommy Leonetti/Robert Troup) Tommy Leonetti, Mary Schneider, XL Capris, Frenzal Rhomb
- "Never Had So Much Fun" Frenzal Rhomb
- "Okay Sydney, You Beat Me" Nic Dalton And His Gloomchasers
- "Old Sydney Town" Alopi Latukefu & the Palermo Express
- "Power and the Passion" Midnight Oil
- "The Piss, The Perfume" Hayley Mary
- "Prague" Ruck Rover
- "Rain Fell Down" Things of Stone and Wood
- "Rep My City" Miracle
- "Ship My Body Home" Ben Lee
- "Somebody Else's Parking Lot in Sebastopol" The Extra Lens
- "Somewhere in Sydney" (Greg Macainsh) Skyhooks
- "Sundays in Sydney" (Dave Steel) Dave Steel
- "Sydney" The Grinning Bellhops
- "Sydney" Shearin' (Feb.2016)
- "Sydney Born Man" (Peter Martin) SCRA
- "Sydney City Ladies" (Martin Adamson [aka Lee Martin], Gabriel Vendetti, Allan Fraiel, Terry Meaney [aka Terry Halliday]) Geeza, Laser Records Streetlife
- "Sydney From a 747" (Paul Kelly) Paul Kelly & the Messengers, Mushroom Records Comedy
- "Sydney Girls" (Anderson/Wells) Rose Tattoo
- "Sydney Harbour Bridge" (Justin Currie) Justin Currie
- "Sydney Ladies" (Broderick Smith/Kerryn Tolhurst), The Dingoes, The Dingoes (1974, Mushroom Records)
- "Sydney or the Bush" *(Norma O'Hara Murphy) Norma O'Hara Murphy
- "Sydney Song" Eskimo Joe
- "Sydney to Newcastle" The Middle East
- "Sydney Town" (Michael Quinlan) The Mexican Spitfires Lupe Velez EP Red Eye Records
- "Sydney Town (The more they try to keep you down in)"* (Hardy/Gary Sheaarson) – Frank Hardy recorded by Gary Shearson
- "Then 'Til Now" Bliss N Eso
- "Tom Uglys Bridge" D. C. Cross
- "Town Hall Steps" (Timothy (Tim) O'Reilly) The Mexican Spitfires Lupe Velez EP Red Eye Records
- "Typically Sydney" The Deadly Hume
- "Wake Up Sydney" Allniters
- "What Sydney Looks Like in June" Alex the Astronaut
- "When the Blue Finally Came" The Wonder Years
- "Where You Wanna Go" K1
- "Whitlam Square" Died Pretty
- "The Winner Is...SYDNEY" Southend
- "You Gotta Love This City" (Tim Freedman) The Whitlams Love this City

=== Tamarama ===
- "Tamarama Doorslammer" *(C.Sue/A.Wilson) Killers on the Loose

=== Tempe ===
- "You Sound like Louis Burdett" – The Whitlams Eternal Nightcap

=== Warilla ===
- "Song to Warilla" (Martin Adamson [aka Lee Martin]) Geeza, Laser Records as a single from Streetlife

=== Warwick Farm ===
- "Harry was a Bad Bugger" (Don Walker) Tex, Don and Charlie

=== Waterloo ===
- "In the Backyard" (Perry Keyes) Perry Keyes

=== White Bay ===
- "The White Bay Paper Seller" *(Judy Small) Judy Small

=== Woolloomooloo ===
- "Hullabaloo" (S. Kelly, J. MacKay) Absent Friends
- "Lanes of Woolloomooloo" John Dengate
- "Numbers Fall" *(Don Walker) Cold Chisel
- "Ruby" (Don Walker) Catfish
- "Sailors into Woolloomooloo" - Nathan Roche
- "Ticket in Tatts" (Mick Thomas) Weddings Parties Anything
- "Woolloomooloo Lair" *(D.Newton/M.Williamson/R.Corbett) The Bushwackers
- "Woolloomooloo Sunset" (McCormack) David McCormack and the Polaroids
- "My City of Sydney" (Tommy Leonetti/Robert Troup)[5] Tommy Leonetti, Mary Schneider, XL Capris, Frenzal Rhomb

== See also ==
- "I've Been Everywhere" – a popular novelty song which mentions, inter alia, several Sydney suburbs albeit not Sydney itself.
- List of songs about Melbourne
- List of songs about Adelaide
