= The Monitors (Australian band) =

Australian pop band

- Genres: Pop; dance
- Years active: 1980–1982
- Labels: Festival
- Past members: Terry McCarthy; Mark Moffatt; Ricky Fataar

The Monitors were an Australian pop band of the early 1980s. They were primarily a studio group which involved a collaboration between Terry McCarthy on vocals and keyboards, and Mark Moffatt on guitar, bass guitar and keyboards. They used various guest vocalists. Their debut single, "Singin' in the '80s", was released in 1980 and reached No. 16 on the Kent Music Report singles chart.

A second single, "Nobody Told Me" (June 1981), peaked in the top 40. The Monitors issued a sole album, Back from Their Recent Illness (October 1982), for which Ricky Fataar had joined on drums, percussion, guitar and keyboards. The group disbanded in 1982.

== History ==
The Monitors were established in 1980 as a studio project by Terry McCarthy on vocals and keyboards, and Mark Moffatt on guitar, bass guitar and keyboards. McCarthy was an advertising director and Moffatt had worked as a musician in various groups before turning to production work. The best known of these groups, The Carol Lloyd Band featured Moffatt on lead guitar and pedal steel guitar, Lloyd (ex-Railroad Gin) on lead vocals and percussion, Gary Broadhurst on bass guitar, Peter Harvey on keyboards, and Danny Simpson on drums. He left that group in 1976.

The Monitors' debut single, "Singin' in the '80s", was released in 1980. It reached No. 16 on the Kent Music Report singles chart in September. It was co-written by McCarthy and Moffatt, with Kim Durant providing the vocals in the chorus. Its music video used the twin sisters, Gayle and Gillian Blakeney, lip-syncing the vocals. They became hosts on children's TV show, Wombat, and actresses on TV soap opera, Neighbours. The video had the singers in similar make-up as used by United States group, KISS.

The Monitors' sole studio album, Back from Their Recent Illness, was released in October 1982 via Festival Records. South African-born Ricky Fataar joined the group on drums, percussion, guitar and keyboards. The album was co-produced by Fataar and Moffatt. The group disbanded at the end of that year. In 1986 Fataar and Moffatt were members of the New Republic with Stewart D'Arietta; they were also members of Shane Howard and the Big Heart Band in 1990.

Mark Moffatt performed as a guitarist with other artists and bands and also worked as a record producer and audio engineer with the Saints, Richard Clapton, Tim Finn, Renee Geyer, Mondo Rock, Mental As Anything, Jimmy and the Boys, Jenny Morris and Melinda Schneider. Terry McCarthy became an advertising executive. Ricky Fataar became a record producer.

Moffatt died from pancreatic cancer in Nashville, Tennessee, on 6 September 2024, at the age of 74.

== Members ==
- Mark Moffatt – engineer/producer, guitar, guitar synthesiser, pedal steel, bass, sequencer, trigger programming
- Terry McCarthy – lead vocals, background vocals, guitar, synthesiser
- Ricky Fataar – drums, percussion, acoustic guitar, synthesiser, piano, organ, lead and background vocals

== Discography ==
=== Studio albums ===
Title	Album details
Back From Their Recent Illness!	Released: 1982; Label: Festival (L 37890)

=== Singles ===
List of singles, with Australian chart positions
Year	Title	Peak chart positions	Album
Year	Title	AUS	Album
1980	"Singin' in the '80s"	16	non album single
1981	"Nobody Told Me"	32	non album single
1982	"Who Did You Think It Was"	-	Back from Their Recent Illness!
1982	"Having You Around Me"	-	Back from Their Recent Illness!
