= The Mexican Spitfires =

- Origin: Sydney, New South Wales, Australia
- Genres: Indie rock; indie pop
- Years active: 1986–1990
- Label: Red Eye
- Past members: Price Conlan; Stephen McCowage; Tim O'Reilly; Michael Quinlan; DJ Pantless

The Mexican Spitfires were an Australian indie rock–indie pop band formed in 1986. The original lineup consisted of Price Conlan on drums, Stephen McCowage on lead guitar, Tim O'Reilly on bass and vocals, Michael Quinlan on rhythm guitar and vocals. O'Reilly, Quinlan and McCowage had all played in a psychedelic 1960s-styled indie pop band, Prince Vlad & the Gargoyle Impalers. They recorded two extended plays, Lupe Velez (1988) and Elephant (1990); however, they had disbanded late in 1989.

== History ==
The Mexican Spitfires were an inner-city suburban band which developed a collection of songs about Sydney. They dealt with aspects of local daily life,: "Ivy Street" about a dilapidated street familiar to Sydney University students who walk to or from Redfern Station; "Sydney Town" on the moral tightrope found between the city and Kings Cross down Park Street; "Town Hall Steps" about a meeting out front of Sydney Town Hall; "Until" on spending time in Katoomba in the nearby Blue Mountains; and "Rookwood" talks about Rookwood Cemetery. Similar lyrical territory was farmed by contemporaries, Paul Kelly & the Coloured Girls and John Kennedy's Love Gone Wrong.

With three songwriters in O'Reilly, Quinlan and McCowage, the band's set lists contained mostly original material. Harking back to their earlier experiences in Prince Vlad & the Gargoyle Impalers, the band displayed a 1960s pop sensibility with strong harmonies from Quinlan and O'Reilly and also covered tracks by the Beatles' "If I Needed Someone" and the Monkees' "Mary Mary".

In July 1986 the Mexican Spitfires played their first gig to an audience at the Lismore Hotel, Sydney. They were signed to Red Eye Records. The group were finalists at a talent quest, Battle of the Bands, run by University of New South Wales in October; alongside Bodycore, Things for the Weekend, Merrie Melodies, and the Jive Turkeys. George Braddock of Tharunka saw their performance in October 1987, he observed "[they] play original songs with a basis on harmony. Like Paul Kelly an acoustic lays the basis for their arrangement with tasteful electric lead following In and out of powerful pop songs. Sounding somewhere between Lloyd Cole and the Smiths, with a hefty dose of Australian pub sounds, they are an interesting and worthwhile Sydney band."

The band's debut six-track 12-inch extended play, Lupe Velez, was released in 1988. The EP was produced by Jon Schofield (of the Coloured Girls), engineered by Phil Punch, and featured a keyboard appearance by Russell Parkhouse (ex-The Riptides). The EP appeared on the independent charts, moving into the top 5 in Sydney and received significant airplay on 2JJ (now 2JJJ), particularly for the "Sydney Town", "You Can't Run" and "Town Hall Steps". Lupe Velez received favourable reviews in English music magazine, NME, and in the Australian music press. "Town Hall Steps" was described by The Sydney Morning Herald's Michael Kozoil as "[an] upbeat ditty... about a summer rendezvous" at Sydney Town Hall.

According to London-based rock music critic, Andrew Mueller, as quoted in Who's Who of Australian Rock the Mexican Spitfires provided "Impressive songs in the Kelly/Kennedy vein with a slightly English sounding pop touch." The EP was favourably received in Germany and Italy, where "You Can't Run" gained substantial airplay on Radio Marte, Radio Luna and Radio Delfino in Catania. The music video for "Sydney Town" made its debut on SBS's world music show, Rock Around the World, before being shown on ABC's, rage. The band also performed "Ivy Street" on the Network TEN programme, Ridgey Didge.

After their debut, the Mexican Spitfires returned to the Electric Avenue Studio of Phil Punch to record their second six-track 12-inch EP, Elephant, during 1989 and 1990. That EP has not been released in any format, despite interest from indie pop labels such as Catania's No Tyme Records.

Two tracks, "Sydney Town" and "You Can't Run (Forever)", were included on a compilation album by Red Eye Records' various artists, Asides and Besides: The First Five Years (1990). Penelope Layland of The Canberra Times described the album, "a fun collection, snappily packaged in bright red. The liner notes explain where each track originated, and indicate if they went anywhere on the independent charts." "Sydney Town" appears on a Sony Music double CD compilation, Somewhere in Sydney: 30 Songs from the Harbour City, which was released in 2000 to coincide with the Sydney Olympic Games.

During the mid to late 1980s, the Mexican Spitfires played many local pubs: the Hopetoun, the Sandringham Hotel in Newtown (aka the "Sando"), Paddington Green, and Harold Park. In 1988 they toured Melbourne with other Red Eye acts the Crystal Set, Curious (Yellow) and the Bhagavad Guitars. The band also played with other bands such as: the Triffids, Roaring Jack, Penguins on Safari (later the Whitlams), the Wet Taxis, the Last Metro, the Upbeat, Billy Baxter and the Hollowmen and John Kennedy of John Kennedy's Love Gone Wrong.

Following McCowage's departure in 1989, DJ Pantless joined the band on lead guitar. That line-up supported the Proclaimers on the Sydney and Canberra leg of their 1989 tour supplemented by Dominic Killalea of the Upbeat filling in on drums. O'Reilly has since gone on to perform with the Sydney gospel music choir, the Elementals, and recorded Live at the Basement.

Whilst the Mexican Spitfires have not played live as a band since early 1989, their music has been played on radio stations like 88.1 FM WMBR Cambridge, Massachusetts, and fans of their music can be found in Australia, Japan, Germany, Italy and the United States.

Since then films have been made about this even in history.

== Discography ==
- Lupe Velez (12-inch EP, 1988) Red Eye Records (RedEP3)
- Elephant (12-inch EP, 1990, unreleased)

Compilations

- "Sydney Town" and "You Can't Run (Forever)" on Asides & Besides: The First Five Years (Compilation CD, 1990) Red Eye Records
- "Sydney Town" on Somewhere in Sydney: 30 songs from the Harbour City (Compilation CD, 2000)
