= Curious (Yellow) =

Australian musical group

- Origin: Sydney, New South Wales, Australia
- Genres: Pop, alternative rock
- Years active: 1987–1990
- Label: Red Eye Records
- Past members: Karin Jansson; Phil Hall; Les White; Michael (Snapper) Knapp; Mike Caen; Violinda

Curious (Yellow) were an Australian pop and alternative rock band formed in 1987 by Swedish-born Karin Jansson, a singer-songwriter and guitarist, formerly of feminist punk band Pink Champagne. Curious (Yellow) had releases on Red Eye Records – an EP, I Am Curious and an album Charms and Blues. Both were produced by Steve Kilbey of The Church, who was Jansson's domestic partner. The band's name and that of their first release are references to the 1967 Swedish cult film I Am Curious (Yellow).

== History ==
Curious (Yellow) was formed in Sydney in 1987 by Karin Jansson as a pop, alternative rock band. Jansson was a guitarist in Swedish feminist punk band, Pink Champagne from 1979 to 1984. That group had released two full-length albums, Vackra pojke! (Beautiful Boy!, 1981) and Kärlek eller ingenting (Love or Nothing, 1983). She relocated to Australia in 1986 and was the domestic partner of Steve Kilbey – vocalist and bass guitarist of Australian alternative rockers, The Church. Jansson recorded demos of her own songs and others she wanted to perform live.

The first line-up of Curious (Yellow) was Jansson with Mike Knapp on drums, and Phil Hall on guitar – both formerly of the punk band Dropbears – and Les White (a.k.a. Lez White) of New Zealand pop-rock group Th' Dudes on bass guitar. In March 1988, Curious (Yellow) released an extended play I Am Curious on Red Eye Records. Both the band's name and the EP title are a reference to the 1967 Swedish film "I Am Curious (Yellow)".

The EP was produced by Kilbey, who also provided keyboards, programming, guitar and backing vocals. The group performed locally and then toured Australia's east coast with fellow Red Eye artists The Bhagavad Guitars, The Crystal Set, and The Mexican Spitfires. Jansson and Kilbey co-wrote The Church's hit single "Under the Milky Way" (February 1988), and Curious (Yellow) often included their version in live performances. After Hall joined the Lime Spiders in December, the first line-up disbanded.

By 1990, a second line-up had formed with Jansson and White joined by Mike Caen (Dragon) on guitar, Jim Bowman on guitar and Mark Dawson on drums. They released two singles, "Taken By Surprise" (August) and "Love Itself" (November), and an album Charms and Blues in September. It was produced by the band and Kilbey, and issued on Red Eye Records and Polydor. In the Encyclopedia of Australian Rock and Pop, Ian McFarlane described the album as "combined airy ambience with melancholy pop". The CD version of the album included "Down the Wishing Well" as a bonus track.

== Discography ==
=== Albums/EPs ===
I Am Curious

- Released: March 1988
- Format: 12" EP (yellow vinyl)
- Label: Red Eye Records (RedEP1)
- Producer: Steve Kilbey

Charms and Blues

- Released: 1990
- Format: LP, CD
- Label: Red Eye Records (Red13), Polydor (843 962-1)
- Producer: Curious Yellow, Steve Kilbey

== Members ==
- Mike Caen (guitar)
- Phil Hall (guitar)
- Karin Jansson (guitar, vocals)
- Michael (Snapper) Knapp (drums)
- Violinda (violin)
- Les White (bass guitar)
