= Timothy O'Reilly =

Timothy O'Reilly may refer to:

- Tim O'Reilly, Irish-American author and publisher, founder of O'Reilly Media
- Tim O'Reilly (musician), musician of Australian rock band The Mexican Spitfires
- Colonel Timothy O'Reilly, a character in the 1937 film Said O'Reilly to McNab
