= Geeza =

Australian rock band

- Also known as: The Geeza Rock'n'Roll Show
- Origin: Sydney, New South Wales, Australia
- Genres: Rock
- Years active: 1973–1979, 2010–2014
- Labels: Living Sound; Laser; RCA
- Past members: Ray Falzon; Lee Martin; Gabriel Vendetti; Ian Webb; Tony Cini; Allan Fraiel; Terry Halliday; Steve Gronow; Scott Cornell; Barrington Davis; John Adams; Dominic Goffredo; Warwick Hoffman; Xerxes Salazar; Brad Johns; Tony Meaney; Martin Skipper; Martyn Wright; Chris Stopforth; Brooke Webb
- Website: www.terryhalliday.com.au/geeza.html

Geeza was an Australian rock band formed in late 1973 in Sydney by Tony Cini, Gabriel Vendetti, Martin Adamson, Allan Fraiel and Ian Webb. Early in their career they performed as The Geeza Rock'n'Roll Show. The band's longest serving member, Terry Halliday, led the band through several incarnations across the 1970s and 2010s, including the release of the band's only album, Streetlife, in late 1977. The album spawned a top 100 single, "Run 'n' Hide" on the Australian Kent Music Report Singles Chart. The group disbanded in 1980, before being reformed by Halliday from 2010 until his death in 2014.

== History ==
=== Early history ===
Originally named "Solid Ash" in 1973 with the line up including Martin Adamson (bass and vocals) Gabby Vendetti (lead guitar) Ray Falzon (rhythm guitar) Ian Webb (drums). After a few successful gigs it was decided to bring in a dedicated singer. It was after a few interviews (one included AC/DC's Dave Evans) that Tony Cini was chosen and Martin began penning original songs. With the new line up of Tony, Gabby, Martin, Ray & Ian, Martin came up with the name Geeza one night after band practice. He was insistent it be spelled that way, and with no opposition so it stuck. Martin acted as the band's manager and the band played many high-profile gigs playing a mix of blues-rock and originals, until they were discovered by Steve Rondo, a local entrepreneur with a high profile out in the Sydney West area.

Steve Rondo took Geeza out of the school and local dance circuit and into serious events often supporting top name acts such as Chain, Sherbet, Buffalo and early AC/DC to name a few. In September 1974, the band underwent a significant change of style and we saw the departure of the two blues musicians Tony Cini and Ray Falzon, the new line up included Terry Meaney (then only 17) on vocals, Gabby Marshall (Vendetti) on guitar, Marty Lee (Martin Adamson) on bass, Ian Marshall (Webb) on first drums and Alan Fraeil on second drums (ala Garry Glitter style). Steve Rondo had devised The Geeza Rock & Roll Show, a lavish (for those days) stage act that cabaret-style theatrical performances included exploding phone boxes and other extravagant props that were used to win over audiences across Sydney.

The band went on to perform live on the back of a flatbed truck as it drove around Parramatta in late 1975, in a similar manner to AC/DC who did the same early the next year. Geeza signed with Living Sound Music. The band's first single, "Vambo", was a cover version of The Sensational Alex Harvey Band's 1973 track "Vambo Marble Eye". It was released by Living Sound in April 1976 and they had shortened their name to Geeza.

=== Streetlife to break-up ===
"Vambo" had garnered enough attention in Geeza to warrant the recording of their first and – as of January 2012 – only studio album, Streetlife. So late in 1976, the group returned to Atlantic Studios to record, which was released in mid-1977. Streetlife spawned two singles, "Run 'n' Hide" and "Song to Warilla", the former peaking at number 56 on the Australian Kent Music Report Singles Chart. The album was produced by Mario Millo (ex-Sebastian Hardie, Windchase). "Run 'n' Hide" was written by Martin and the album was issued by Laser Records.

Immediately following the release of Streetlife, bassist and songwriter Martin departed the band and was replaced by Steve Gronow. Geeza then went on to support the Ted Mulry Gang on their three-month national tour to support their LP, Disturbing the Peace, from April to June 1978. Following the tour, Fraiel and Gronow left the band and were replaced by John Adams and Scott Cornell, respectively, from Railroad Gin. Halliday left later that year, to be replaced by Barrington Davis (ex-Powerpact, Kahvas Jute). Early in 1979, Vendetti, Cornell and Adams then left, being replaced by Xerxes Salazar, Dominic Goffredo (who had filled in for Cornell previously) and Warwick Hoffman respectively.

The line-up of Davis, Salazar, Goffredo and Hoffman wrote and recorded 8 new tracks, however these tracks were not released as Geeza broke up soon after recording.

=== Reformation ===
In 2010, former lead vocalist Terry Halliday contacted the other members of Geeza's 1977 lineup (Gabriel Vendetti, Lee Martin and Allan Fraiel) in an attempt to reform the band. However, the other members were unavailable and so gave Halliday permission to reform Geeza with an all new lineup. Halliday then contacted guitarist Brad Johns, bass guitarist Martin Skipper, drummer Tony Meaney and saxophonist Martyn Wright, who all joined the band for a number of performances during 2010.

However, this lineup would not last, as Johns and Skipper departed the band before the end of the year and they were replaced in late 2011 by Chris Stopforth and Brooke Webb, respectively. Geeza was disbanded for a second time when Terry Halliday died in 2014, at the age of 55.

== Band members ==
Past members

- Ray Falzon – rhythm guitar (1973–1974)
- Lee Martin – bass guitar (1973–1977)
- Gabriel Vendetti – lead guitar (1973–1979)
- Ian Webb – drums (1973–1975)
- Tony Cini – vocals (1973–1974)
- Allan Fraiel – drums (1974–1978)
- Terry Halliday – vocals, rhythm guitar, synthesiser (1975–1978, 2010–2014)
- Steve Gronow – bass guitar (1977–1978)
- Scott Cornell – bass guitar (1978–1979)
- Barrington Davis – vocals (1978–1980)
- John Adams – drums (1978–1979)
- Dominic Goffredo – bass guitar (1979–1980)
- Warwick Hoffman – drums (1979–1980)
- Xerxes Salazar – lead guitar (1979–1980)
- Brad Johns – lead guitar (2010)
- Tony Meaney – drums (2010–2014)
- Martin Skipper – bass guitar (2010)
- Martyn Wright – saxophone (2010–2014)
- Chris Stopforth – lead guitar (2011–2014)
- Brooke Webb – bass guitar (2011–2014)

== Discography ==
=== Studio albums ===
List of albums, with selected chart positions
Title	Album details	Peak chart positions
Title	Album details	AUS
Streetlife	Released: March 1977; Format: LP; Label: Laser (VXL1-4046)	79

=== Singles ===
List of singles, with selected chart positions
Year	Title	Peak chart positions	Album
Year	Title	AUS	Album
1976	"Vambo"	–	non-album single
1977	"Run 'n' Hide"	56	Streetlife
1977	"Song to Warilla"	–	Streetlife
