= Eros Zeta and the Perfumed Guitars =

Studio album by the Church
- Released: 29 March 2024
- Studios: Brooklet; Damien Gerard; Spacejunk; Communicating Vessels; Best Western Cottontree Inn; EastWest; Studio 606; Real World
- Length: 65:24
- Label: Easy Action
- Producer: The Church

The Church chronology
The Hypnogogue (2023)	Eros Zeta and the Perfumed Guitars (2024)	'Lacuna' (2026)

Eros Zeta and the Perfumed Guitars is the 27th studio album by the Australian band the Church. It was released on 29 March 2024. It is a companion album to 2023's The Hypnogogue and expands on the latter's science fiction concept. The album has the same guitar driven jangle/goth rock sound as its predecessor. Several songs on the latter album appeared on later deluxe digital editions of The Hypnogogue. Before its official release, it was sold at Church concerts during their autumn 2023 North American tour.

Professional ratings
Review scores
Source	Rating
AllMusic	4/5 stars
Backseat Mafia	9.3/10
Louder Than War	5/5 stars
PopMatters	8/10

== Track listing ==
All tracks are written by Steve Kilbey, Timothy Powles, Ian Haug, Jeffrey Cain, and Ashley Naylor.

Eros Zeta and the Perfumed Guitars
No.	Title	Length
1.	"Realm of Minor Angels"	3:31
2.	"Pleasure"	4:28
3.	"Amanita"	3:26
4.	"2054"	5:45
5.	"Manifesto"	4:35
6.	"The Immediate Future"	5:48
7.	"Sublimated in Song"	3:47
8.	"Song 18"	4:15
9.	"The Weather"	4:47
10.	"Korea"	3:48
11.	"Song from the Machine Age"	5:49
12.	"Sleeping for Miles"	3:30
13.	"Last Melody"	2:17
14.	"A Strange Past"	9:34
15.	"Music from the Ghost Hotel"	3:52
Total length:		65:24

Streaming bonus track
No.	Title	Length
16.	"A Strange Past" (Single Edit)	3:48
Total length:		69:12

== Personnel ==
Credits are adapted from the CD liner notes of Eros Zeta and the Perfumed Guitars on Easy Action.

The Church

- Steve Kilbey
- Tim Powles
- Ian Haug
- Jeffrey Cain
- Ashley Naylor

Additional musicians

- Nicholas Meredith – drums (tracks 4, 6, 12)
- Leslie Van Trease – second drum set (14)
- Eric Avery – bass (14)
- Brad Timko, Jebin Bruni – synthesizer (14)
- Amanda Kramer – end piano (14)

Technical and design

- The Church – production
- Kip McClanahan – executive production
- Jordan Power – engineering; additional production (3)
- Andrew Beck, Jeffrey Cain, Timothy Powles, Ted Howard, Brad Timko, Chris Steffan, Oli Jacobs – engineering
- Darrell Thorp – mixing, engineering
- David Ives – mastering
- Christiana Monored – cover collage
- Steve Kilbey, Jeffrey Cain, Richard Bruxner – photography
- Carl Breitkreuz – design
