= After Everything Now This =

Studio album by The Church
- Released: 28 January 2002 (UK)
- Genre: Alternative rock, neo-psychedelia, psychedelic rock, dream pop
- Label: Cooking Vinyl, Thirsty Ear
- Producer: Tim Powles and The Church

The Church chronology
A Box of Birds (1999)	After Everything Now This (2002)	Parallel Universe (2002)

After Everything Now This is the thirteenth album by the Australian alternative rock band The Church, released in January 2002. It was produced by group member Tim Powles and the rest of the band.

Recordings for a follow-up album to Hologram of Baal (September 1998) turned out to be painstakingly slow due to numerous side projects and geographical locations of different members – with Steve Kilbey in Sweden, Marty Willson-Piper in England and the others in Australia. While taking time off to focus on solo efforts and other work – including a brief reunion of All About Eve for Willson-Piper, the bandmates met across several separate sessions. Partially recorded in both Sweden and Australia, After Everything Now This, appeared in January 2002 and saw a focus on the softer elements of the band. With only three obvious "rock" tracks out of ten, gentler soundscapes predominated. The successive world tour had the band in a more subdued setting as well, with most tracks performed primarily acoustically and featuring guest tour and session musician David Lane on piano.

A double album of remixes and outtakes from the After Everything sessions was released in November, entitled Parallel Universe.

Professional ratings
Review scores
Source	Rating
AllMusic	3/5 stars

== Track listing ==
All songs written by Kilbey/Koppes/Powles/Willson-Piper

1. "Numbers" – 4:29
2. "After Everything" – 6:01
3. "The Awful Ache" – 5:17
4. "Song for the Asking" – 5:08
5. "Chromium" – 3:44
6. "Radiance" – 5:59
7. "Reprieve" – 5:40
8. "Night Friends" – 7:20
9. "Seen it Coming" – 4:58
10. "Invisible" – 7:48

== Personnel ==
- Steve Kilbey – lead vocals, bass guitar, keyboards, guitar
- Peter Koppes – guitars, keyboards, bass guitar, backing vocals
- Tim Powles – drums, percussion, backing vocals
- Marty Willson-Piper – guitar, bass guitar, backing vocals, lead vocals on "Chromium"

=== Additional players ===
- Clayton Doley – Wurlitzer piano (1, 6 & 7)
- David Lane – ambient piano, grand piano (2, 4 & 8)
- Jane Seymour – violin, viola (2, 3, 7 & 9)

== Charts ==
Chart (2002)	Peak position
Australian Albums (ARIA)	133
