= Jack Frost (Australian band) =

Australian rock band

- Origin: Sydney, New South Wales, Australia
- Genres: Rock
- Years active: 1990–1991; 1995–1996
- Labels: Red Eye/Polydor; Arista; Karmic Hit; Beggars Banquet
- Past members: Steve Kilbey; Grant McLennan

Jack Frost were a short-term Australian rock band, a side project for Grant McLennan (of the Go-Betweens) and Steve Kilbey (of the Church). They released two albums, Jack Frost (1991) and Snow Job (1996). Australian musicologist, Ian McFarlane, determined their material, "ranged from romantic ballads to tough rock, with the two singers' voices fitting together well."

== History ==
In July 1990 Steve Kilbey (of the Church) contacted Grant McLennan (of the Go-Betweens), "he's interested in the idea of them writing a song together. Grant says 'Come over and bring your 12-string' and offers to bake some cookies." Kilbey on lead vocals, guitar, bass guitar, keyboards and drums and McLennan on lead vocals, guitar, keyboards and bass guitar formed Jack Frost in Sydney in 1990.

The pair wrote enough tracks for a self-titled album, which was released in 1991, via Red Eye Records/Polydor Records. The album was recorded in three weeks, with Pryce Surplice on drums, synthesiser and as co-producer; plus "special guests" including Karin Jansson on backing vocals. Mclennan said, "Whatever you hear is the only version of that song musically. We didn't do three or four versions to choose from. We didn't plan it at all. Everything was written in the studio on that day. Lisa Waller of The Canberra Times reported in November 1990 that, "[the duo] are doing a couple of live acoustic performances in Sydney and Brisbane but will wait to see how the album is received before making more commitments to their new found partnership."

Australian musicologist Ian McFarlane described Jack Frost as "[the songs] ranged from romantic ballads to tough rock, with the two singers' voices fitting together well." Jonathan Romney in Q Magazine called the album "a mix of mannered intensity, detached fol-krock cool and - occasionally downright wiseacre-hood." The album provided two singles, "Every Hour God Sends" (November 1990) and "Thought That I was Over You" (April 1991) before the members resumed their solo careers and main band projects. Waller's colleague compared their styles, "Kilbey writes with a lush opulence. The ambience of the songs is as important as the lyrics. McLcnnan writes with a more subtle sound, where the lyrics are as demanding as the arrangements."

Kilbey and McLennan resumed the Jack Frost project in late 1995. They had recorded new material back in 1993 and were joined in the studio by Kilbey's brother Russell on backing vocal, organ and blues harp, Tim Powles (from the Church) on drums and percussion and Jamie Pattugalan on drums (on the track, "Pony Express"). McFarlane noticed, "The resultant album, Snow Job, came out to little fanfare and duly sank without a trace." It was co-produced by the Kilbey brothers and McLennan. Woroni's Brett Leigh Dicks described how "[it] is a reflection of a unique teaming. But whereas Jack Frost's first endeavour relied heavily on programming, the mechanics of this recording is based upon a very different texture."

By 1996 the pair resumed their separate musical careers.

Grant McLennan died in May 2006 of a heart attack.

== Discography ==
=== Albums ===
Title	Details
Jack Frost	Released: 1991; Label: Red Eye/Polydor; Format: CD, Cassette, LP
Snow Job	Released: 1996; Label: Karmic Hit; Format: CD

=== Singles ===
Title	Year	Album
"Every Hour God Sends "	1990	Jack Frost
"Thought That I Was Over You"	1991	Jack Frost
