= Tant Strul =

Tant Strul was a Swedish punk rock band that are considered as the leading all female punk rock band in Sweden, although they at times had a male member. The last setting before they split up was: vocalist, guitarist and songwriter Kajsa Grytt, keyboardist Malena Jönsson, bassist Liten Falkeholm, drummer Nike Markelius, and cellist Sebastian Öberg (from the Flesh Quartet).

== History ==
The band started in 1981 with band members Kärsti Stiege (the mother of Swedish pop star Lykke Li), Liten Falkeholm, Kajsa Grytt, Malena Jönsson and Micke Westerlund. Kärsti left after the first two singles, and Micke left after the first LP "Tant Strul" (1981) and was replaced by Nike. The band now consisted of four women: Kajsa Grytt, Malena Jönsson, Liten Falkeholm and Nike Markelius. After the second LP "Amason" (1983), Sebastian Öberg joined the group. After the third LP "Jag önskar dig" (1984) the group split up.

Their style of music got softer over the years, and by the time the cellist Öberg joined the group they could hardly be called a punk rock group any more. After the split, Kajsa Grytt and Malena Jönsson formed a duo who released two LP's with laid back songs, based on Malena's piano and Kajsa's voice: "Historier från en väg" (1986) and "Den andra världen" (1988). Then Kajsa Grytt became a solo artist who so far has released four albums: "Kajsa Grytt" (1990), "Revolution" (1994), "Är vi på väg hem" (2003) and "Brott och straff" (2006).

Before joining Tant Strul, Kajsa Grytt was briefly a member of Pink Champagne, and Liten Falkenholm played with Eldkvarn.
