= Dominic Killalea =

Australian musician

Dominic Killalea is an Australian musician who was a Sydney-based indie rock singer-songwriter and guitarist, playing in different bands during the 1980s and 1990s including The Upbeat, The Go, and Zoo Story. He played with The Mexican Spitfires during their 1989 tour of Sydney and Canberra with The Proclaimers. Killalea also played during the early 1990s in the cover band The Dilburys and in the late 1990s in The New Dilburys, with many new members - the other original member being saxophonist Michael Goy, who also played with Zoo Story. In 2006, Killalea recorded a CD with a group called Riandom but it remained unreleased. The CD, Turn it On! was released in April 2018 on streaming services and as a digital download.

Mr Killalea currently lives in New Zealand and is the principal of Wellington High School.
