= John Foy (visual artist) =

Australian visual artist

John Foy (born 1958) is an Australian visual artist.

== Career ==
John Foy worked at Phantom Records, a record store in Sydney, in the late 1970s. He designed their advertisement and helped with screen printing for their Phantom T-shirts business.

After teaching himself how to screen print, Foy began designing posters for local bands such as the Visitors and Lipstick Killers. He designed posters for international artists such as Debbie Harry and Lou Reed during their Australian tours, and his work stood out at the time for featuring artwork when most posters didn't.

In 1986, Foy founded Red Eye Records, and continued to run the label during the 1990s in partnership with major label Polydor. When Foy turned 40, he stepped away from the music business and Polydor took over Red Eye.

In 2018, Foy published a book of his work titled Snaps Crack Pop!. It was later republished in 2022. He continues to be best known for the posters he created in the 1970s and 1980s. His work is held in Powerhouse Museum. A record of his career is held by the Art Gallery of NSW.
