= The Hypnogogue =

Studio album by The Church
- Released: 24 February 2023
- Studios: Damien Gerard (Balmain, Sydney, New South Wales); Spacejunk (Sydney, New South Wales); Communicating Vessels (Birmingham, Alabama); Airlock (Brisbane, Queensland)
- Genre: Psychedelic rock
- Length: 64:40
- Language: English
- Label: Communicating Vessels
- Producer: Steve Kilbey

The Church chronology
| Man Woman Life Death Infinity (2017) | The Hypnogogue (2023) | Eros Zeta and the Perfumed Guitars (2024) |

The Hypnogogue is the 26th studio album by Australian psychedelic rock band The Church, released on 24 February 2023.

== Critical reception ==
Professional ratings
Aggregate scores
| Source | Rating |
|---|---|
| Metacritic | 86/100 |
Review scores
| Source | Rating |
| AllMusic | (Note: As of June 2025, the editors at AllMusic have downgraded their previous album rating of 4.5 to 4 stars out of 5.) |
| American Songwriter | 3.5/5 stars |
| Classic Rock | 8/10 |
| The Irish Times | 3/5 stars |
| Louder Than War | 5/5 stars |
| PopMatters | 9/10 |
| Record Collector | 4/5 stars |
| Uncut | 8/10 |
| Under the Radar | 7.5/10 |

According to the review aggregator Metacritic, The Hypnogogue received "universal acclaim" based on a weighted average score of 86 out of 100 from eight critic scores. AllMusic critic Matt Collar wrote that the band manages to write "more sophisticated and mature versions of their classic material" on this concept album. Hal Horowitz of American Songwriter gave this release 3.5 out of 5 stars and writing that "the quintet creates fluid moods, moving in idiosyncratic directions while maintaining the shadowy gaze that has defined The Church's style". In Glide Magazine, Doug Collette writes that "this latest work would function effectively as an introduction to this rock and roll institution from Down Under" for displaying their "vintage sound including blended acoustic guitars". At PopMatters, John Garratt gave this album a 9 out of 10, calling it "another stunning record" by the band. Dom Gourlay of Under the Radar scored The Hypnogogue a 7.5 out of 10, stating that it "reaffirms why this band have been held in high esteem for so long" and the two ending tracks elevate "The Hypnagogue [sic] to even dizzier heights among the higher echelons of The Church's already impressive canon".

=== Accolades ===
| Publication | Accolade | Rank | Ref. |
|---|---|---|---|
| PopMatters | Best Rock Albums of 2023 | 23 | |
| PopMatters | Best Albums of 2023 | 67 | |
| Spin | Albums of the Year 2024 | — | |

== Track listing ==
All songs written by The Church.

1. "Ascendence" – 5:38
2. "C'est la vie" – 4:55
3. "I Think I Knew" – 3:57
4. "Flickering Lights" – 4:50
5. "The Hypnogogue" – 6:13
6. "Albert Ross" – 3:54
7. "Thorn" – 4:12
8. "Aerodrome" – 4:32
9. "These Coming Days" – 4:37
10. "No Other You" – 4:10
11. "Succulent" – 6:48
12. "Antarctica" – 5:34
13. "Second Bridge" – 5:20

== Personnel ==
Credits are adapted from the CD liner notes of The Hypnogogue on Communicating Vessels.

The Church

- Steve Kilbey
- Timothy Powles
- Ian Haug
- Jeffrey Cain
- Ashley Naylor

Additional musicians

- Roger Mason – strings, additional keyboards
- Georgia St. James – additional backing vocals on "No Other You"

Technical and design

- Steve Kilbey – production, inside cover painting, photography
- Andrew Beck – co-production, tracking, arrangement engineering
- Jeffrey Cain – co-production, additional engineering, photography
- Timothy Powles – co-production, additional engineering
- Ted Howard, Brad Timko – additional engineering
- Kip McClanahan – executive production
- David Ives – mastering at 101 Mastering
- Darrell Thorp – mixing
- Christiana Monored – cover collage
- Richard Bruxner – photography
- Carl Breitkreuz – design

== See also ==
- List of 2023 albums
