= Steve Kilbey =

Australian musician (born 1954)

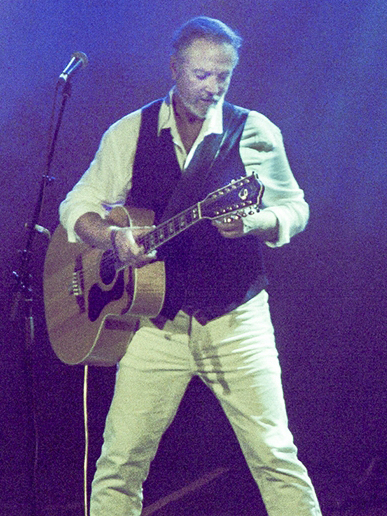
- Kilbey performing solo in Sydney, August 2020

Background information
- Born: Steven John Kilbey; 13 September 1954 (age 72); Welwyn Garden City, Hertfordshire, England
- Origin: Canberra, Australian Capital Territory, Australia
- Genres: Alternative rock, post-punk, new wave, dream pop, glam rock
- Occupations: Singer, songwriter, lyricist, composer, bass guitarist, music producer, poet, painter
- Instruments: Vocals, bass, guitar, keyboards
- Years active: 1971–present
- Labels: Enigma, Rykodisc, Rough Trade, Red Eye Records, Vicious Sloth, Second Motion Records, Karmic Hit, thetimebeing.com
- Website: thetimebeing.com

Steven John Kilbey (born 13 September 1954) is an English-born Australian singer-songwriter best known as the lead singer and bass guitarist for the rock band The Church. He is also a music producer, poet, and painter. As of 2020, Kilbey has released 14 solo albums and has collaborated on recordings with musical artists such as Martin Kennedy, Stephen Cummings and Ricky Maymi as a vocalist, musician, writer and/or producer. Ian McFarlane writes that "Kilbey's solo recordings [are] challenging and evocative. They ran the gamut of sounds and emotions from electronic and avant-garde to acoustic and symphonic, joyous and dreamy to saturnine and sardonic".

As of 2020, Kilbey has over 1,000 original songs registered with Australian copyright agency Australasian Performing Right Association.

== Career ==
=== 1954–1979: Early years ===
Kilbey was born in Welwyn Garden City, England, UK, and moved to Australia with his parents at the age of five. He grew up around Dapto but the family eventually moved to Canberra. He began his professional music career at the age of 17 when he joined a Canberran five piece "cabaret band" called Saga. Around 1974 he joined a rock band featuring future Church bandmate Peter Koppes on drums called Precious Little.

This was followed by Kilbey forming Baby Grande around 1974 whilst still living in the Australian Capital Territory Koppes was also in Baby Grande for a time but left to travel, then played in a band called Limazine which brought him in touch with future Church drummer Nick Ward. Baby Grande recorded some demos for EMI Australia in 1977 but were not signed to a permanent recording contract. Baby Grande's demos surfaced on the internet after about 30 years, and despite initial protests from Kilbey, he has now made four of the five tracks available on his solo compilation album of early work Addendaone (2012).

Kilbey was also a member of the new wave band Tactics for approximately a month in 1977. He played "about four gigs" with Tactics before being asked to leave by the band's singer and songwriter Dave Studdert.

=== 1980–present: The Church ===
Kilbey formed the Church, together with Koppes and Nick Ward in Sydney in the late 1970s. Marty Willson-Piper joined the band in May 1980 days after his arrival in Australia when he went to see the band play a gig. After some success in their native Australia in the early 1980s, Kilbey and The Church went on to international fame when "Under the Milky Way", from the 1988 album Starfish, achieved success (Kilbey had co-written the song with Karin Jansson of Pink Champagne and Curious Yellow). "Under the Milky Way" appeared in the top-selling singles charts of both Australia and the United States (US). In late 2011 Kilbey revealed that, at the time of the interview, the song was still used for television programmes and advertisements. The Church were inducted into the ARIA Hall of Fame in 2012. At the ceremony, Kilbey delivered a lengthy speech as part of the induction that included stories from his musical career and a sung verse from the song "Old Man Emu" by Australian country music artist John Williamson.

In late 2012, as an act of protest against the conduct of the Church's North American label Second Motion Records, Kilbey announced his resignation from the band. The announcement was made on Kilbey's Facebook fan page following the receipt of an insufficient royalty cheque from the record label. However, the Church continued as an active band and, in November 2013, Kilbey published an official announcement on his Facebook fan page stating that Willson-Piper was replaced by former Powderfinger member Ian Haug. Kilbey explained that Haug would join the band for the recording of a new album, for which he had 16 songs written, as well as subsequent touring, and also defended the decision in the statement saying, "If you can't dig it I'm sorry. This is my f—ing band after all and it has existed at times without Peter and in the beginning without Marty and for times in between while he went AWOL."

Prior to the release of the Church's 21st album, Further/Deeper, Kilbey spoke to the media about his prolific body of musical work that is continually growing saying "Just because I've written that many songs [750] doesn't mean anything. But imagine if you were having an operation on your brain and a 60-year-old surgeon walked into the theatre. You would think, I'm in safe hands. He's been doing this all his life and he's very good at it. I think I have become very good at pulling lyrics and melodies out of the air. Melodies weren't always my strong point; on a lot of The Church's early records the melodies weren't as elaborate as what I'm doing now. In the last few years, I think I am tapping into something ... It's like I'm tapping into the collective human subconscious."

=== Solo work ===
==== 1985–1991: Red Eye label ====
Kilbey released his debut solo single, "This Asphalt Eden" in July 1985.

Kilbey's first studio albums Unearthed, Earthed the mini-album The Slow Crack were released in 1986 and 1987. Issued simultaneously with Earthed was a book of the same name containing Kilbey's prose and poetry (published in 1986). The Earthed album was conceived as a possible soundtrack to the reading of the book, which had come first in terms of conception.

Following the worldwide success of The Church's Starfish album and "Under the Milky Way" single, Kilbey returned to his solo career in 1989 with his third album, Remindlessness in December 1989. In December 1991, Kilbey released the EP Narcosis, his last solo release for the Red Eye label.

==== 1992–present: Continued success ====
In 1992, Kilbey and his younger brother, John Kilbey launched the Australian record label Karmic Hit. The label roster included the owners' bands, side projects and solo works as well as those by other artists: the Bhagavad Guitars (John Kilbey's group), Snog, David Lane and Halogen.

In 1997, Kilbey collaborated with brother Russell on the ambient instrumental/electronic album Gilt Trip. (1997) In May 1997, Kilbey released Narcosis Plus.

Between 2009 and 2017, Kilbey released numerous collaborative albums with Martin Kennedy of All India Radio as Kilbey/Kennedy. Kennedy explained the inception of the working relationship in a 2013 interview: "I was working with Steve long before I actually met him. Steve had heard All India Radio, and he asked my brother John if I had any spare instrumental songs lying around that he could contribute lyrics to." Kennedy subsequently sent Kilbey "thrown-away tracks" from All India Radio recording sessions.

In July 2013, Kilbey performed at the Fly By Night venue in the Western Australian port city of Fremantle, with local musicians, Shaun and Adrian Hoffmann (The Hoffmenn), Shaun Corlson, Rachael Aquillina and Anna Sarcich playing as his backing band. Aquillina and Sarcich formed the string section, leading to the naming of the corresponding live recording: With Strings Attached. According to Kilbey's Time Being site, he explored his "back catalogue of solo releases, collaborations and Church classics" during the performance.

=== Other projects ===
Kilbey founded Hex and Jack Frost.

==== 1988–1991: Hex ====
In 1988, Kilbey formed the duo Hex with singer, songwriter and guitarist Donnette Thayer. Hex released two albums, the self-titled Hex in 1989 and Vast Halos 1990.

==== 1990–1996: Jack Frost ====
In 1990, Kilbey formed Jack Frost as a collaboration with Grant McLennan of Brisbane band The Go-Betweens. Jack Frost released a debut self-titled album in December 1991, preceded by the single "Every Hour God Sends". The duo released a second studio album, Snow Job in 1996, prior to McLennan's death.

==== 1994–1995: Fake ====
In 1995, Kilbey formed Fake with Boris Goudenov and Sandy Chick. Fake released a self-titled album on Mushroom records in 1994.

==== 2004–2012: Isidore ====
In 2004, Kilbey formed Isidore with John Kilbey and Jeffrey Cain of Remy Zero. Isidore released a self-titled album in 2004 and a second album Life Somewhere Else in 2012.

==== 2007: Mimesis ====
In 2007, Kilbey formed the ambient, psychedelic crossover band, Mimesis, with Simon Polinski, Colin Berwick and David Abiuso. They released an album, Art Imitating Life in 2007 on the Psy-Harmonics label.

==== 2013: Speed of the Stars ====
The band "Speed of The Stars" is Steve Kilbey of The Church and Frank Kearns of Cactus World News. Together they started work on this project back in the late 90's and released the first album in 2016. A second album has been recorded with Barton Price and Hugo Race.

== Writing ==
Kilbey released Earthed in 1986. In 1998, Kilbey published a book of poetry entitled Nineveh/The Ephemeron; Kilbey later republished a hard copy version that contained both books and a limited number of 50 copies was released.

In 2017, Kilbey published Fruit Machine: Essays on Rock, a limited edition featuring his own cover artwork. The book is not a formal collection of essays but an extended poetic meditation on rock music.

In August 2013, Uncollected, described as, "A deluxe edition of his books – Earthed, The Ephemeron, Nineveh, Fruit Machine and other selected work", was released on his own Time Being label. Kilbey's inaugural autobiography, Something Quite Peculiar, was then published by Hardie Grant on 1 November 2014.

=== Bibliography ===
==== Works by Kilbey ====
- Earthed (1986) – Steve Kilbey. Australian ed privately published (assisted by Phil Tripp); sold via mail order. Packaged in the US as a booklet version with the soundtrack album Earthed.
- Nineveh & The Ephemeron (1998) – Steve Kilbey/Erskine Music and Word. Kilbey's second and third poetry books issued in one volume. Published by Trevor Boyd, sold via mail order. "Nineveh" is 'automatic' recollections of the ancient city which has long fascinated Kilbey. "The Ephemeron" concerns the adventures of Erskine the Magician.
- Earthed, Nineveh, and The Ephemeron (Brisbane: Impressed Publishing, 2004) ISBN 978-0-9751618-9-0. Omnibus edition of Kilbey's first three poetry books; published by Graham Nunn. Cover art by Kilbey.
- Fruit Machine: Collected Essays on Rock (2007) – Steve Kilbey (assisted by Graham Nunn). (Brisbane: Impressed Publishing; no ISBN). Cover art by Kilbey. Not a collection of formal essays but a poetic meditation on rock music.
- Uncollected (2013) – Steve Kilbey/Edited by Steve Kilbey, Graham Nunn and Samantha Mayfair. Published by The Time Being (ISBN 978-0-646-90398-9). Cover art by Kilbey. Omnibus edition of Kilbey's near-complete collected poems including the complete Earthed, Nineveh, The Ephemeron and Fruit Machine, plus Uncollected - a 240-page selection of Kilbey's favourite poems from his Time Being blog 1986-2013.
- Something Quite Peculiar: The Church. The Music. The Mayhem. (2014) – Steve Kilbey. (Melbourne: Hardie Grant Books, ISBN 978-1-74270-831-7). His autobiography.
- Tarot of the Time Being (2015) by Steve Kilbey and K. P. Buk (White River Junction, VT: Batten Down the Hatches, 2015). (Art by Kilbey, text by Buk). Co-edited by Leigh Blackmore with Sigrid Lium and Steven J. Kilbey, for trade edition (ISBN 978-1-4951-3981-9, images in black and white). Co-edited by Blackmore with Mark E. Merrill and Steven J. Kilbey, for Special Limited Edition (ISBN 978-1-4951-5941-1, images in colour, Foreword by Donnette Thayer). Book accompanied by full-colour Tarot pack featuring Kilbey's artwork.
- Eros Zeta and the Hypnogogue. (2023). (no place: White Point Books. ISBN 979-8-218-28439-8). Novel set in the same imaginative universe as the albums by The Church The Hypnogogue (2023) and Eros Zeta and the Perfumed Guitars(2024) Cover image by Christiana Monored.

== Other ==
- Ruth Hessey and Samantha Trenoweth (eds). Screwed: Stories About Love and Sex St Leonards, NSW: Allen & Unwin, 1998. Includes the short story "In the beginning [all over again]" by Kilbey (as by Steven Kilbey). Steve's younger brother Russell Kilbey (of The Crystal Set) has a short story, "Brother Ryan's Heavenly Gate" in the same volume.
- Andrew McMillen. Talking Smack: Honest Conversations About Drugs. (University of Queensland Press, 2014). Includes a conversation about drugs with Steve Kilbey.
- Kate Morgan (ed) A Song from the Road: Touring Tales from Our Best Singer-Songwriters. (Sydney: Pier 9/Murdoch Books, 2013). Includes a poetic essay by Steve Kilbey on rock life, "I Sing the Infernal Eternal Tour."
- Tamara Sheward and Jenny Valentish (eds) Your Mother Would Be Proud: True Tales of Mayhem and Misadventure. Crows Nest, NSW: Allen & Unwin, 2009. Includes the brief autobiographical Steve Kilbey essay "The Enemies of Rock 'N' Roll."

== Art ==
In addition to his other creative outlets, Kilbey is an artist who has shown at least two exhibits in the United States. A collection of his paintings are shown on his website The Time Being and his social media. He has an exhibition in Australia called Amphibia.

== Personal life ==
Kilbey resides in Australia on the east coast with his long-term partner and musical collaborator, Rachel, and his dog Truscott . He has also lived in Stockholm, Sweden and Los Angeles. Kilbey has twin daughters (Elektra and Miranda) with Karin Jansson, his ex-girlfriend. Elektra and Miranda have a popular dream pop duo called Say Lou Lou and record in their homeland of Sweden.

=== Drug use ===
As documented in the authorised biography No Certainty Attached (written with Kilbey's involvement), Kilbey was dependent on the drug heroin during the 1990s, an aspect of the musician's personal life that was mostly hidden until Kilbey was arrested on a drug-related charge in 1999 in New York City. Kilbey eventually ceased using the drug after a period of detoxification in 2000. In a 2012 interview, Kilbey reflected on his personal history: "I also have a lot of regret that I didn't do it better, that I wasn't a better person, that I wasn't nicer to people or make better records and that at times I would slack off and just do any old thing. I wish I hadn't made so many mistakes with the drugs."

Kilbey stated that he wrote most songs of his while under the influence of marijuana, as it helps him cope with his Asperger syndrome or autism. "Pot allows my mind to do the things it wants to do, which is freely associate", he said.

Kilbey then participated in an interview for journalist and writer Andrew McMillen's 2014 book Talking Smack: Honest Conversations About Drugs, as well as a July 2014 feature interview with McMillen for the Australian newspaper. Kilbey explained in an article that he was introduced to the drug by now-deceased Australian musician Grant McLennan, of Brisbane band The Go-Betweens, during the recording period for a new project named Jack Frost. "It came right out of the blue... It [heroin] was the last thing on my mind. I went, 'Oh, here's $100, get me some too.' No one had ever offered it to me up until then. All the other drugs you might get offered but no one ever says, 'Hey, want some heroin?' It's not like that. If you've got a stash, you don't offer it. You don't really go around turning other people on. It's not the sort of thing you advertise."

Kilbey states that he "loved" heroin when he first snorted it and continued to use the drug while living in a Surry Hills, Sydney home that doubled as a recording studio. Kilbey then made the transition to injecting the drug with the assistance of a fellow heroin user who was an unregistered doctor. He explained to McMillen that he also became fascinated with the culture surrounding the use of the drug. Upon reflection, Kilbey described it as a "rubbish world."

Following unsuccessful interventions involving family and friends and a relocation to Sweden where he found heroin easier to obtain, Kilbey eventually used methadone in 2002 to wean himself off opiates. Since 2002, Kilbey has occasionally used heroin but as he explained in the Australian interview, "it [heroin] doesn't do it for me. I have no temptation. I'm just not interested anymore." The interview concludes with Kilbey expressing his belief about the problematic nature of drug prohibition, whereby the musician referred to opiate use during the 19th century. "We let people have booze, cigarettes, wars ... Why not let them have smack? People used to take it and it wasn't seen as a problem. If you lived in 1890 and you were an opium fiend, that was your problem: to take it and to find out how to stop taking it. It was nothing to do with the law ... Now, I'm not going to sit here and go, 'Oh, kids, look what I did to my life because I was a drug addict. Please don't be like me. Please be Mister Straight.' I don't believe in that either. I think we have to grow up and look at why drugs are illegal ... I just don't want people to believe the hype, that if you take drugs, you're necessarily an evil villain. You might be a silly person or a weak person. But you're not a bad person."

=== Spirituality ===
Kilbey has revealed that he and Richard Ploog often visited Sydney's Adyar Bookshop (bookshop of the Theosophical Society) during the 1980s to read books by occultist and mystical authors such as Helena Blavatsky, George Gurdjieff and P.D. Ouspensky. Likewise, spiritual mysticism is evident in the lyrics of songs as early as "An Interlude" with its line "psychic angels spread on the top of her head", and the song "Tear It All Away" whose lyrics are clearly about seeing beyond the mundane . The song "When You Were Mine" on The Blurred Crusade is about past-life experience ("On a day like this, a hundred lifetimes ago..."). "Myrrh" from Heyday includes Christian imagery but seems to be as much about the nature of inner mystical experience: "How can you be so invisible?/Give me the eyes to see/Privilege on privilege/An unwanted discovery" The thread of spiritual exploration runs through many of Kilbey's lyrics to the present day, such as on more recent songs such as "Invisible" from 2002 (first appeared on After Everything Now This), with its refrain: "All I ever wanted to see was just invisible to me."

Kilbey's lyrics often quote historical and mythological events and his interest in Eastern culture and religion frequently informs his music—this also applies to his painting (he often paints Hindu gods and goddesses). He has cited the Bhagavad Gita as a particular influence, describing himself as a devotee of Krishna.

== Discography ==
=== Studio albums ===
Title	Details
Unearthed	Released: 1986; Label: Red Eye Records, (RED LP 1), Polydor (843628–1); Format: LP, Cassette
Earthed	Released: 1987; Label: Red Eye Records (RED LP 2); Format: LP, Cassette, CD
Remindlessness	Released: December 1989; Label: Red Eye Records (RED CD 11), Polydor (843 534–2); Format: LP, Cassette, CD
Gilt Trip (with Russell P. Kilbey)	Released: 1997; Label: Vicious Sloth Collectables (VSC–004); Format: CD
Narcosis +	Released: May 1997; Label: Vicious Sloth Collectables (VSC–005); Format: CD
Acoustic and Intimate	Released: 2000; Label: Karmic Hit (KH007); Format: CD
Dabble	Released: November 2001; Label: Karmic Hit (KH009); Format: CD
Painkiller	Released: November 2008; Label: Karmic Hit (KH041); Format: CD, DD
Art, Man + Technology	Released: January 2009; Label: Steve Kilbey; Format: CD, DD; Note: spoken word album
Unseen Music Unheard Words (with Martin Kennedy)	Released: August 2009; Label: Inevitable Recordings (INV010); Format: CD, DD
Damaged/Controlled (with GB3)	Released: 2010; Label: Rubber Records (RUB260); Format: CD, DD
White Magic (with Martin Kennedy)	Released: February 2011; Label: Inevitable Recordings (INV013); Format: CD, DD
Garage Sutra	Released: July 2012; Label: The Time Being Records; Format: CD, DD
The Idyllist	Released: January 2013; Label: Steve Kilbey; Format: CD, DD
You Are Everything (with Martin Kennedy)	Released: May 2013; Label: Inevitable Recordings (INV016); Format: CD, DD
Songs from the Real World (Commissioned Songs) (with Martin Kennedy)	Released: 2013; Label: Inevitable Recordings (INV018); Format: CD, DD
Songs from the Real World Vol. 2 (Commissioned Songs) (with Martin Kennedy)	Released: August 2014; Label: Inevitable Recordings (INV019); Format: CD, DD
Inside We Are the Same) (with Martin Kennedy)	Released: March 2015; Label: Inevitable Recordings (INV020); Format: CD, LP
Songs from the Real World Vol. 3 (Commissioned Songs) (with Martin Kennedy)	Released: 2015; Label: Inevitable Recordings (INV024); Format: CD, DD
The Word Is (with HuDost)	Released: 2015; Label: Open Sesame Music; Format: CD, DD
Glow and Fade (with Martin Kennedy)	Released: 2017; Label: Golden Robot Records (GOLDRR014); Format: CD, DD, LP, streaming
Sydney Rococo	Released: November 2018; Label: Golden Robot Records (GOLDRR024); Format: CD, DD, LP, streaming
You Are Everything: The Early Drafts (with Martin Kennedy)	Released: February 2019; Label: Steve Kilbey; Format: DD
Chryse Planitia (with Gareth Koch)	Released: December 2019; Label: Steve Kilbey, Foghorn; Format: DD
The Dangerous Age (with Kate Ceberano and Sean Sennett)	Released: 31 January 2020; Label: Universal Music Australia (0851550); Format: CD, DD, streaming
Songs from Another Life: Music of Antiquity (with Gareth Koch)	Released: May 2020; Label: Steve Kilbey; Format: DD
Eleven Women	Released: September 2020; Label: Foghorn (FOG501); Format: CD, DD
Jupiter 13 (with Martin Kennedy)	Released: March 2021; Label: Foghorn Records (FOG535); Format: CD, DD
The Hall Of Counterfeits (with The Winged Heels)	Released: June 2021; Label: Foghorn Records (FOG546); Format: CD, DD
Of Skins and Heart (Acoustic Sessions Vol. 1)	Released: March 2022; Label: Public Opinion Music (PUBLIC 0041); Format: CD, LP, DD, streaming

=== Soundtracks ===
Title	Details
The Rare Earth (with Martin Kennedy and All India Radio)	Released: 2014; Label: Inevitable Recordings (INV020); Format: CD, DD

=== Live albums ===
Title	Details
Live At The Toff in Town (with Martin Kennedy)	Released: 2010; Label: Steve Kilbey and Martin Kennedy; Format: DD
With Strings Attached (with Hoffmenn)	Released: 2013; Label: Steve Kilbey; Format: DD; Note: Recorded at Fly By Night Musicians Club, Fremantle on 6 July 2013
Live At The Toff 2013 (with Martin Kennedy)	Released: July 2015; Label: Steve Kilbey and Martin Kennedy; Format: DD; Note: Recorded at the Toff in Town, May 2013
Live At The Vanguard (with Martin Kennedy)	Released: August 2015; Label: Steve Kilbey and Martin Kennedy; Format: DD; Note: Recorded at the Vanguard, Sydney, June 2013

=== Compilations ===
Title	Details
Freaky Conclusions	Released: 2003; Label: Karmic Hit (KH015); Format: CD; Note: Home recordings from 1980 to 1984.
Artifacts	Released: 2006; Label: Steve Kilbey; Format: DD; Note: Collection of Steve Kilbey demos, dating from the late 1970s to mid 1980s.
David Neil – The Wilderness Years (with Ricky Maymi)	Released: July 2011; Label: Steve Kilbey and Ricky Maymi; Format: CD, LP; Note: recordings from 1970s, remastered in 2000s.
Addendaone	Released: September 2012; Label: Steve Kilbey; Format: CD, DD; Collaborations, rarities, hard to finds demos from 1960–1995.
Addendatwo	Released: September 2012; Label: Steve Kilbey; Format: CD, DD; Note: Collaborations, rarities, hard to finds demos from 1995–2010.
Miscellanaea – Whispers in the Static	Released: February 2014; Label: Steve Kilbey; Format: CD, DD; Note: Miscellanea recordings between 2011 and 2013.
Intriguing Objects (with Martin Kennedy)	Released: 6 August 2021; Label: Format: CD, DD; Note: Outtakes, remixes and curios 2009–2020.

=== Box Sets ===
Title	Details
Monsters 'N' Mirages	Released: 2010; Label: Second Motion Records (CD–SMR–018); Format: 8xCD; Note: Unearthed, Earthed, The Slow Crack, Remindlessness, Narcosis + More, Dabble, Freaky Conclusions, and Artifacts
Present – Every Song from The Real World: The Complete Collection (with Martin Kennedy)	Released: 2016; Label: Inevitable Recordings (INV027); Format: DD, 3xCD; Note: Collection of Steve Kilbey demos, dating from the late 1970s to mid 1980s.

=== Extended plays ===
Title	Details
The Slow Crack	Released: 1987; Label: Red Eye Records (RED 15); Format: LP, Cassette, CD
Transaction	Released: 1989; Label: Red Eye Records (RED 19); Format: 12" LP
No Such Thing	Released: 1990; Label: Red Eye Records (RED 20); Format: 12" LP, CD
Narcosis	Released: 1991; Label: Red Eye Records/Polydor (511 647–2); Format: CD

=== Singles ===
Title	Year	Album
"This Asphalt Eden"	1985	non album single
"Fireman"	1987	The Slow Crack
"Transaction"/ "No Such Thing"	1990	No Such Thing
"Revealed" (with Blank & Jones)	2005	
"Hear in Noiseville" (with Pocket	2009	
"A Song for Jade"	2012	
"Vivid"	2012	
"Lorelei" (with Martin Kennedy)	2013	
"Omega" (with HuDost)	2018	
"Something That Means Something" (with HuDost)	2018	
"Broken Toys" (with Gareth Goch)	2019	Chryse Planitia
"Lost at Sea" (with Gareth Goch)	2019	Chryse Planitia
"Monument City Lights, 1973" (with Kate Ceberano & Sean Sennett)	2019	The Dangerous Age
"My Restless Heart" (with Kate Ceberano & Sean Sennett)	2019	The Dangerous Age
"All Tied Up" (with Kate Ceberano & Sean Sennett)	2019	The Dangerous Age

== Awards and nominations ==
=== Australian Songwriter's Hall of Fame ===
The Australian Songwriters Hall of Fame was established in 2004 to honour the lifetime achievements of some of Australia's greatest songwriters.

Year	Nominee / work	Award	Result
2011	Himself	Australian Songwriter's Hall of Fame	Inducted
