= All India Radio (band) =

Australian electronic band

- Origin: Tasmania, Australia
- Years active: 1997–present

All India Radio is an Australian electronic band. Their style includes genres such as lo-fi, downtempo and instrumental. The founding (and constant) member of the band is Martin Kennedy. Their debut album, The Inevitable, was released in 1999.

All India Radio have had their music featured in film and TV including CSI: Miami, One Tree Hill, Sicko, Till Human Voices Wake Us, Big Brother Australia, Bondi Rescue and Recruits. Kennedy, with All India Radio and Steve Kilbey, provided the original soundtrack music for the Australian film The Rare Earth.

All India Radio's self-titled third album was nominated for an Australian Recording Industry Award (ARIA) Award in 2003. The band has worked with Steve Kilbey, Graham Lee, Ed Kuepper, and David Bridie, among others.

Wired Magazine described the group's sound as "mash[ing] the ambient-hop signatures of DJ Shadow, Tortoise and Thievery Corporation with the instantly recognizable guitar sound tracking of Ennio Morricone and Angelo Badalamenti."

All India Radio's 19th studio album The Generator of All Infinity was released in September 2022.

== Discography ==
=== Albums ===
List of albums
Title	Album details	Peak chart positions
Title	Album details	AUS
The Inevitable	Released: 1999; Label: Inevitable Recordings (INV001); Formats: CD	—
002	Released: 2001; Label: Inevitable Recordings (INV002); Formats: CD	—
All India Radio	Released: 2003; Label: Inevitable Recordings (INV003); Formats: CD+DVD, digital	—
Permanent Evolutions	Released: November 2005; Label: Inevitable Recordings (INV004); Formats: CD, digital; Note: A collection of remixes, film music and unreleased songs from the years 1999–2005.	—
Echo Other	Released: 2006; Label: Inevitable Recordings (INV005); Formats: CD, digital	—
These Winter Dreams	Released: February 2008; Label: Inevitable Recordings (INV007); Formats: CD, digital; Note: First purely "ambient" album	—
Film Musik	Released: May 2008; Label: All India Radio; Formats: digital; Note: A collection of music used in film and TV productions	—
Fall	Released: June 2008; Label: Inevitable, Minty Fresh (MF 95); Formats: CD, digital	—
Fallout	Released: December 2008; Label: Inevitable; Formats: CD, digital	—
A Low High	Released: May 2009; Label: Inevitable Recordings (INV009); Formats: CD, digital	—
Once a Day: Remixes & Unreleased Tracks Vol. 1	Released: December 2009; Label: All India Radio; Formats: digital	—
Piano & Ambience	Released: 2010; Label: All India Radio; Formats: digital; Note: Recorded in 2004	—
The Silent Surf	Released: November 2010; Label: Inevitable Recordings (INV012); Formats: CD, LP, digital	—
The Inevitable Remixes 1	Released: March 2011; Label: All India Radio; Formats: digital	—
Free Me: Remixes & Unreleased Tracks Vol. 2	Released: March 2011; Label: All India Radio; Formats: digital; Note: Alternate mixes and radio edits	—
Red Shadow Landing	Released: October 2012; Label: Inevitable Recordings (INV015); Formats: CD, LP, digital	—
The Silent	Released: May 2013; Label: Martin Kennedy; Formats: digital	—
Lo Fi Frequencies 1996-2001	Released: August 2013; Label: All India Radio; Formats: digital; Note: demos, remixes and unreleased songs	—
The Rare Earth (with Martin Kennedy and Steve Kilbey)	Released: 2014; Label: Inevitable Recordings (INV020); Formats: CD, LP, digital	—
Red Shadow Landing Demos	Released: 2014; Label: All India Radio; Formats: digital; Note: Demo versions of tracks from Red Shadow Landing	—
Fall Remixes	Released: February 2014; Label: All India Radio; Formats: digital; Note: Remixes from 2007's Fall	—
Ghost Songs: Remixes & Unreleased Tracks, Vol. 3	Released: March 2014; Label: All India Radio; Formats: digital	—
Live at Triple R	Released: August 2014; Label: All India Radio; Formats: digital; Note: Recorded in 2011	—
The Slow Light	Released: April 2015; Label: All India Radio; Formats: CD, digital; Note: 10th studio album	—
Desert Tapes	Released: August 2015; Label: Spectra; Formats: digital; Note: Lo-fi recordings from 1984 to 1994	—
The Haunted World	Released: September 2016; Label: Martin Kennedy; Formats: digital; Note: Second "ambient" album	—
Embryo Músico, Vol. 1	Released: July 2017; Label: Martin Lawrence Kennedy; Formats: digital	—
Solo Electronique 1984	Released: September 2017; Label: Martin L. Kennedy; Formats: digital; Lo-fi experiments from 1984. Companion album to Desert Tapes	—
Space	Released: April 2018; Label: All India Radio; Formats: digital	—
Subspace	Released: July 2018; Label: Martin L. Kennedy; Formats: digital	—
Space Sources	Released: November 2018; Label: Martin L. Kennedy; Formats: digital; Note: 2-track album	—
Undulated	Released: January 2019; Label: Martin L. Kennedy; Formats: digital	—
The Aether	Released: October 2019; Label: Martin L. Kennedy; Formats: digital	—
Eternal	Released: October 2019; Label: Martin L. Kennedy; Formats: digital	—
Internal	Released: November 2019; Label: Martin L. Kennedy; Formats: digital	—
Realm (with Josh Roydhouse)	Released: March 2020; Label: Martin L. Kennedy; Formats: digital	—
Slo	Released: April 2020; Label: Spectra; Formats: CD, digital	—
Reconstructions (with David Bridie)	Released: October 2020; Label: Spectra; Formats: digital	—
Afterworld	Released: April 2021; Label: Spectra; Formats: CD, digital	—
The Underworld	Released: June 2021; Label: Spectra; Formats: digital; Note: A collection of outtakes, remixes and demos from Afterworld	—
Lost Realm (with Josh Roydhouse)	Released: November 2021; Label: Spectra; Formats: digital; Note: A collection of unreleased tracks from Realm	—
Utopia 2021	Released: March 2022; Label: Spectra; Formats: digital; Note: A collection of early mixes, unreleased tracks and demo versions	—
The Generator of All Infinity	Released: September 2022; Label: Spectra; Formats: CD, LP, digital; Note: 19th studio album	—
The Unified Field	Released: 31 October 2025; Label: Spectra; Formats: CD, LP, digital	89

== Awards and nominations ==
=== ARIA Music Awards ===
The ARIA Music Awards is an annual awards ceremony that recognises excellence, innovation, and achievement across all genres of Australian music. They commenced in 1987.

Year	Nominee / work	Award	Result	Ref.
2003	All India Radio	Best World Music Album	Nominated	
