= Say Lou Lou =

Pop music duo

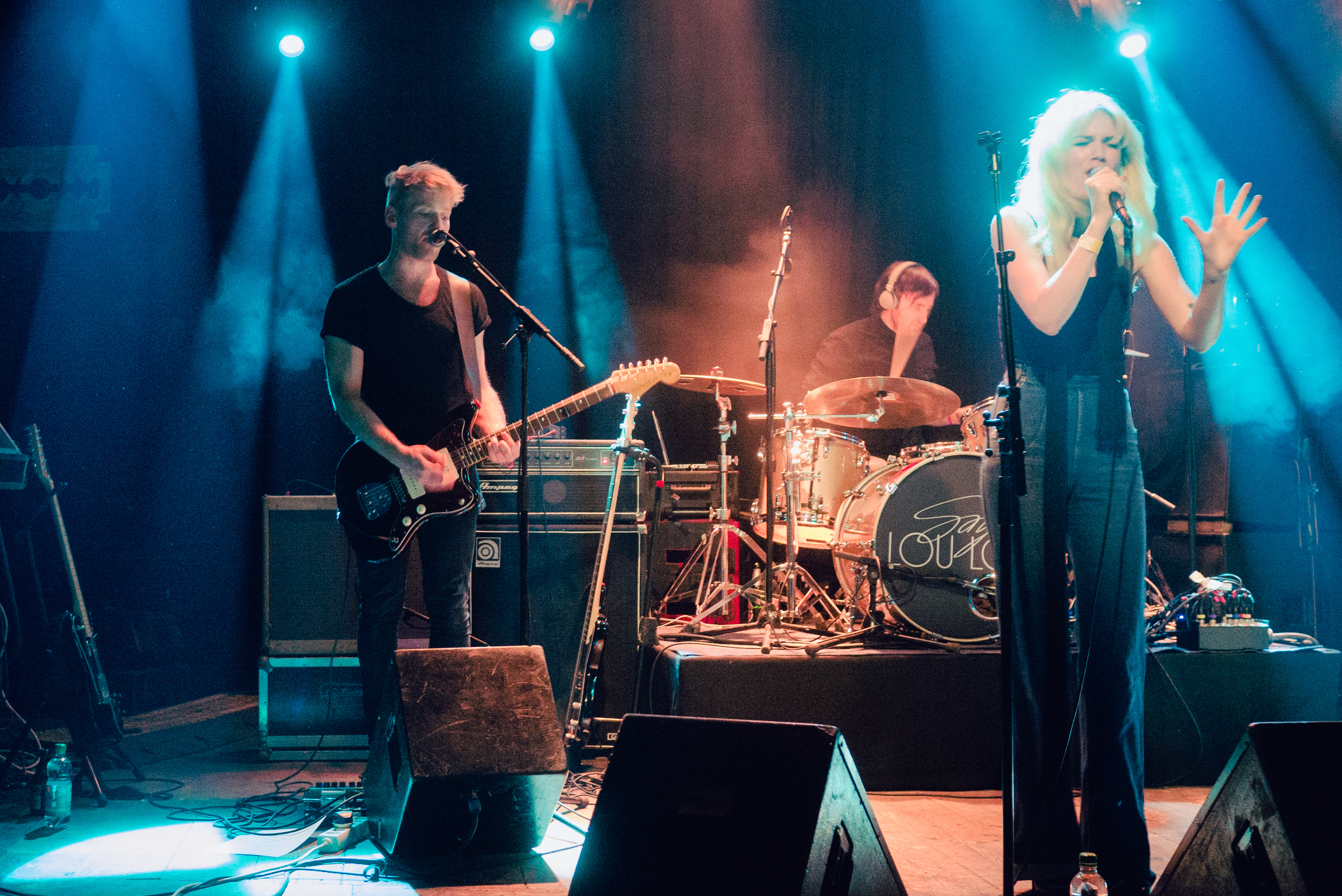
- Say Lou Lou performing in 2014

Background information
- Also known as: The Twillies; Saint Lou Lou
- Genres: Dream pop; synth-pop
- Years active: 2012–present
- Labels: à Deux; Kitsuné; Downtown; Columbia; Cosmos
- Members: Elektra Kilbey-Jansson; Miranda Kilbey-Jansson

Say Lou Lou (formerly Saint Lou Lou) are a twin sister musical duo hailing from Australia and Sweden. Anna Miranda and Elektra June Kilbey-Jansson (born 7 June 1991) are the daughters of Steve Kilbey, the lead singer of Australian alternative band The Church, and Karin Jansson, ex-girlfriend and recording partner of Kilbey (and before then a member of Swedish new wave band Pink Champagne). They grew up in both Australia and Sweden.

The duo released their first single in 2012 before forming their own record label, à Deux, in 2013. In December 2013, it was announced that Say Lou Lou had made the BBC Sound of 2014 longlist.

Over the course of 2012 to 2014, Say Lou Lou released five singles, and their debut studio album, Lucid Dreaming, was released on 23 February 2015 in Scandinavia and 6 April 2015 elsewhere. On 26 October 2018, the duo released their second studio album, Immortelle.

== Discography ==
=== Studio albums ===
Title	Details	Peak chart positions
Title	Details	SWE
Lucid Dreaming	Released: 23 February 2015; Label: à Deux, Cosmos; Formats: LP, digital download	49
Immortelle	Released: 26 October 2018; Label: à Deux, Cosmos; Formats: CD, LP, digital download	—
Dust	Released: 22 November 2024; Label: Cosmos; Formats: CD, LP, digital download	—

=== Extended plays ===
Title	Details	Peak chart positions
Title	Details	SWE
Dust, Pt. 1	Released: 12 April 2024; Label: Cosmos; Formats: LP, digital download	—
Dust, Pt. 2	Released: 22 November 2024; Label: Cosmos; Formats: LP, digital download	—

=== Singles ===
Title	Year	Album
"Maybe You"	2012	Non-album single
"Julian"	2013	Lucid Dreaming
"Better in the Dark"	2013	Non-album single
"Everything We Touch"	2014	Lucid Dreaming
"Games for Girls" (with Lindstrøm)	2014	Lucid Dreaming
"Nothing but a Heartbeat"	2015	Lucid Dreaming
"Blue on Blue"	2015	Non-album single
"Hard for a Man"	2015	Lucid Dreaming
"Stayin' Alive"	2016	Non-album single
"Ana"	2018	Immortelle
"Golden Child"	2018	Immortelle
"The Look of Love"	2019	Non-album single
"Waiting for a Boy"	2023	Dust
"You're the One"	2023	Non-album single
"Wong Kar-wai"	2024	Dust
"Above Love"	2024	Dust
"Wish I Could Hold You"	2024	Dust

=== Music videos ===
Title	Year	Director(s)
"Maybe You"	2012	Philippe Tempelman
"Julian"	2013	Philippe Tempelman
"Better in the Dark"	2013	Laura Gorun and Dimitri Basil
"Everything We Touch"	2014	Jesse John Jenkins
"Games for Girls"	2014	Dimitri Basil
"Nothing but a Heartbeat"	2015	Joanna Nordahl, Paulina Golebiowska
"Blue on Blue"	2015	Philippe Tempelman
"Golden Child"	2018	Laura Gorun and Dimitri Basil
"The Immortelle Manifesto"	2018	Philippe Tempelman
"The Look of Love"	2019	Zoe Chait
