= The Crystal Set =

Australian indie rock group

- Origin: Sydney, New South Wales, Australia
- Genre: Indie rock
- Years active: 1983–1992, 2025–present
- Label: Red Eye/Polydor
- Past members: Russell Kilbey; Phil Maher; Davey Ray Moor; Charles Ratcliffe; Tim Seckhold; Craig Hooper; Luke Blackburn; Darren "Fud" Ryan; Paul Agar; Mark Evans

The Crystal Set were an Australian indie rock group formed in March 1983. By 1987 the line-up was Russell Kilbey (bass and lead vocals), Phillip Maher (guitar and vocals), Davey Ray Moor (keyboards and vocals) and Tim Seckhold (drums). In April 1988, Moor was replaced by Craig Hooper, who was in turn replaced by Luke Blackburn in May 1989. The group issued two studio albums, From Now On (May 1987) and Almost Pure (April 1991), before disbanding later that year. Russell Kilbey is the younger brother of the Church's mainstay, Steve Kilbey.

== History ==
The Crystal Set were formed in March 1983 in Sydney by Russell Kilbey on bass guitar and lead vocals, Phillip Maher on lead guitar and vocals, Davey Ray Moor on keyboards and backing vocals, and Charles Ratcliffe on drums. The four members had all attended Copland College in Canberra; Kilbey and Ratcliffe had also been in a local garage band, the Puppets. After "four months of rehearsing, The Crystal Set began to play all over Sydney, concentrating its performances in the 'inner-city circuit' and gradually branching out to country areas such as Bathurst and Newcastle." Australian musicologist, Ian McFarlane, felt that they "emerged with a refined, atmospheric brand of psychedelia and rock that drew influences from UK artists as diverse as The Cure and Brian Eno."

The Crystal Set released their first single, "A Drop in the Ocean", independently on their own Set label in December 1984. It was "designed, packaged and distributed by the band members themselves." Moor declared, "We want to gain some independence just like Midnight Oil, before we look for an agent." By May 1985 they signed to Red Eye Records, which issued their second single, "Benefit of the Doubt". Ratcliffe had left and they used studio drummers, Mark Evans on the B-side, "Don't Be Surprised", and John Lloyd on the A-side.The single was produced by Guy Gray. The first single was re-issued by Red Eye Records in November. By that time they "had built up a strong cult following around Sydney."

Tim Seckhold took up the drums in time for The Crystal Set's next two singles, "Wholly Holy" (April 1987) and "Who Needs Who Now?" (December), and their debut album, From Now On (May). It was produced by Steve Kilbey. The singles were moderate indie hits via airplay on youth radio station, JJJ. The Canberra Times' reviewer critiqued "Who Needs Who Now" and observed that the group "are numbing live, but in the small doses provided by singles they are acceptable. This track is quite likeable and extremely polished for an independent record... Nice production and street credibility, the North Shore girls should love it."

Moor left in April 1988 and Craig Hooper (ex-the Reels) on keyboards and guitar joined Kilbey, Maher and Seckhold to release a six-track extended play, Cluster, in July, which was produced by Hooper. One side featured songs recorded with Moor while the other side featured compositions with Hooper. The group disbanded at the end of that year.

When The Crystal Set reconvened in May 1989, Kilbey assumed guitar duties and vocals; together with Maher and Seckold they were joined by Luke Blackburn on bass guitar and backing vocals. When Red Eye Records signed a distribution deal with Polydor Australia in 1990, the group's second album, Almost Pure (April 1991), signalled their transition from an independent act to one associated with a major label. It found moderate national success with the singles, "She Spits out Stars" (December 1990) and "Thrive" (June 1991). Their Red Eye/Polydor label mates were The Cruel Sea, The Clouds, Steve Kilbey, Jack Frost (Steve Kilbey and Grant McLennan of The Go-Betweens), The Bhagavad Guitars, Curious (Yellow) and The Beasts of Bourbon.

In 1991, Kilbey and Maher relocated to Melbourne and recruited Darren "Fud" Ryan on drums and Paul Agar on bass and backing vocals as new members. To promote Almost Pure the band toured supporting United Kingdom band, The Wonder Stuff, as well as headlining their own shows in Melbourne, Sydney and Brisbane. However, The Crystal Set disbanded at the end of 1991.

The band reformed in 2025 for a run of live shows, with Kilbey, Maher and Hooper joined by bassist Robbie Warren (Died Pretty) and drummer Rudi Weber. In February 2026, the band released "Critical Mass!", its first single in 34 years.

Russell Kilbey collaborated with David Thrussell from techno-industrial outfit Snog in Sex Industrie. The duo released a cover version of the AC/DC song, "Jailbreak". The Crystal Set compilation album, Umbrella, originally issued in 1989, was re-released on CD in 2025 with an extra track, "Drop in the Ocean". Russell and Steve Kilbey worked as a duo, Gilt Trip, which issued two albums Gilt Trip (1997) and Egyptian Register (2005). Russell had also collaborated with another brother, John Kilbey (ex-The Bhagavad Guitars), as Warp Factor 9, which released an album, 5 Days in a Photon Belt (1993).

== Members ==
- Russell Kilbey
- Phil Maher
- Davey Ray Moor
- Charles Ratcliffe
- Tim Seckhold
- Craig Hooper
- Luke Blackburn
- Darren "Fud" Ryan
- Paul Agar
- Mark Evans
- Robbie Warren
- Rudi Weber

== Discography ==
=== Albums ===
- From Now On (Red Eye Records, 1987)
- Cluster (mini-album, Red Eye Records, 1988)
- Umbrella (compilation, Red Eye Records/Polydor Records, 1990)
- Almost Pure (Red Eye Records/Polydor Records, 1991)

=== Singles ===
- "A Drop in the Ocean" (Set, December 1984)
