= Red Eye Records (store) =

Red Eye Records is an independent record store and mail order business, located in Sydney, Australia. Established in 1981, it is the largest indie store in the country.

Red Eye stocks a diverse range of local and import releases, both new and second hand. All genres are catered for; the store specialises in sourcing hard to find Australian items, and stocking releases by local independent artists.

The store is currently located at 143 York Street, in the Sydney CBD (The original Red Eye Records store was on the corner of King Street and George Street). It often hosts free, all ages live performances and appearances by local and international artists. Artists who have performed in-store over the years include Amy Shark, Beck, Supergrass, Jay Reatard, Eddy Current Suppression Ring, The Church, Ween, Ash, The Gossip, Jonathan Richman, Severed Heads and Lisa Marie Presley, as well as many local bands.

Red Eye Records won the ARIA Award for Outstanding Independent Retailer in 2012, 2013 & 2015.

The Red Eye Records label was spawned from the store in the 1980s, though it existed as a separate entity.

== See also ==
Red Eye Records (label)
