= Kajsa Grytt =

Swedish musician (born 1961)

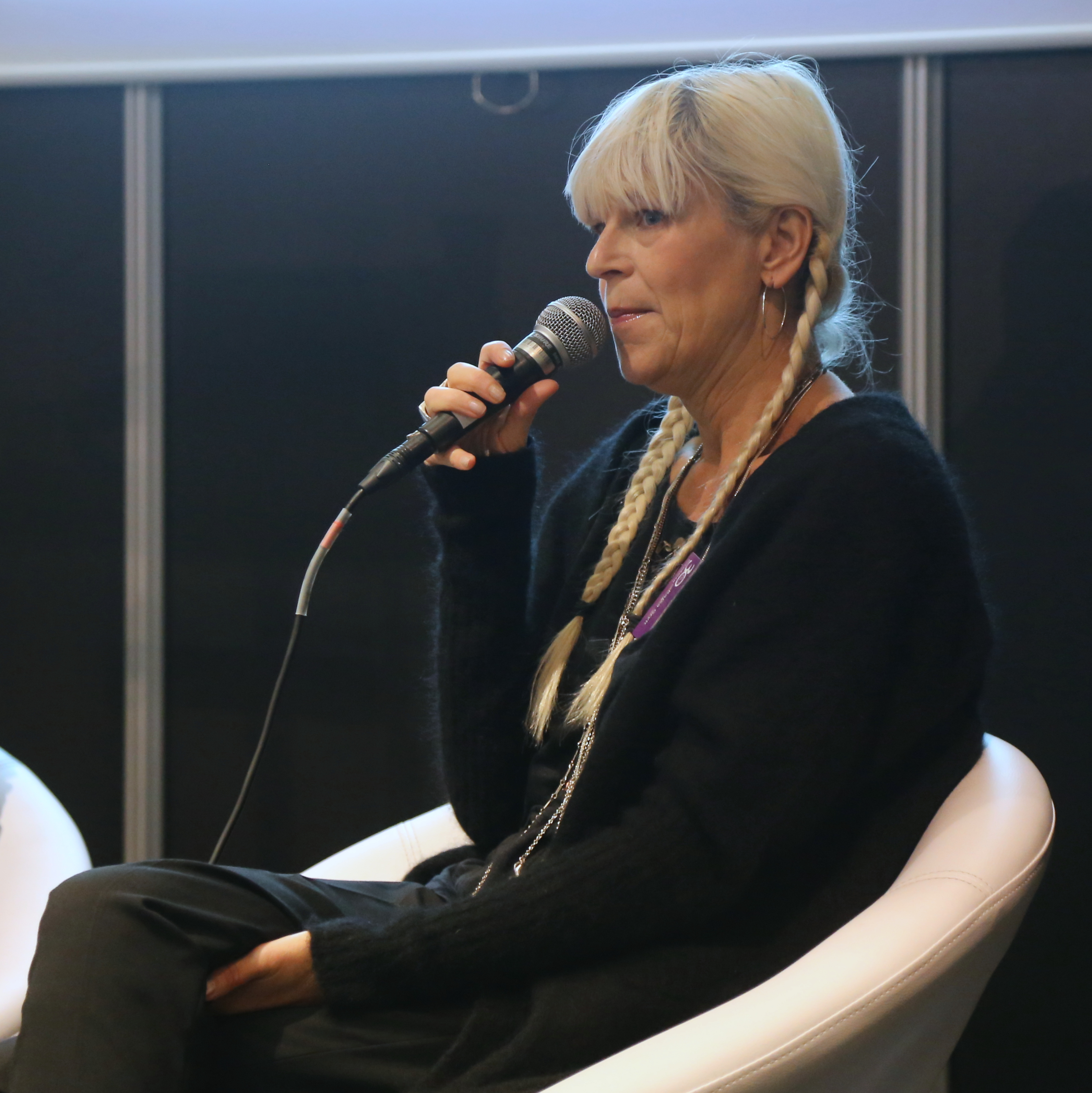
- Grytt in 2014

Background information
- Born: Karin Johanna Grytt; 20 June 1961 (age 65)
- Origin: Stockholm, Sweden
- Occupation: Singer
- Years active: 1979–present
- Website: Official website

Karin Johanna "Kajsa" Grytt (born 20 June 1961) is a Swedish punk-rocker, guitarist, singer and songwriter. She was between 1979 and 1985 guitarist in the band Tant Strul and 1985 to 1988 and around 1996 a member of the duo Kajsa och Malena. Grytt wrote most of the lyrics to the band's songs.

Grytt is nowadays a solo singer and made her musical comeback in 2003. She played along with David Giese during a few years, and then along with Jari Haapalainen, who also produced her two latest solo albums. She has so far made five solo albums and on her album Brott & straff several of the songs were written by female prisoners. On the same album Grytt did a duet with Joakim Thåström.

In 2011, Kajsa Grytt released the album En kvinna under påverkan and the biography book Boken om mig själv (The book about myself). In April 2011 Sveriges Television broadcast an interview with Grytt where she talked about the book and the new album and how she looks on her life these days.

In 2014, Grytt released her first novel called Nio dagar, nio nätter. And in late 2014, she participated in season five of the TV4 show Så mycket bättre.

== Discography ==
=== Singles ===
Title	Year	Peak chart positions	Album
Title	Year	SWE	Album
"Allt faller"	2009	—	Non-album singles
