= Carol Lloyd (Australian singer) =

Australian musician (1948–2017)

Background information
- Born: Carol Ann Cramb; 17 October 1948; Auchenflower, Queensland, Australia
- Died: 13 February 2017 (aged 68) Auchenflower, Queensland, Australia
- Genres: Rock; soul; R&B; pop; country
- Occupations: Singer; songwriter; composer; advertising executive
- Instruments: Voice; percussion
- Years active: 1971–2017
- Formerly of: Railroad Gin; Carol Lloyd Band; Women in Voice

Carol Ann Lloyd (1948–2017), born as Carol Ann Cramb, was an Australian singer, songwriter, composer, and advertising executive. She was described as "Australia's original rock chick" for her role in the Brisbane-based bands Railroad Gin (1973–75) and Carol Lloyd Band, as well as her solo career. She was recognised for her long, curly red hair, which was insured with Lloyd's of London for $100,000. Carol Ann Lloyd died on 13 February 2017 due to complications from her interstitial pulmonary fibrosis and chronic obstructive pulmonary disease, diagnosed four years earlier.

== Early years ==
Lloyd was born as Carol Ann Cramb on 17 October 1948 at the Fermoy Private Hospital, Auchenflower, Queensland to D and E Cramb of nearby Taringa. She had two older brothers. Lloyd attended Rocklea State School.

== Musical career ==
=== 1970s ===
Lloyd became the lead singer of Brisbane R&B group, Railroad Gin, in September 1971. Australian musicologist, Ian McFarlane, observed "[Lloyd] was the band's focal point with her commanding stage presence, husky blues voice and wild mane of red hair."

In 1973 Railroad Gin performed a Rock Mass with the Queensland Youth Orchestra at St John's Cathedral in Brisbane. The band were signed to PolyGram and had three singles that reached the top of the local charts, "A Matter of Time" (June 1974), "Do Ya Love Me?" (October) and "You Told the World" (March 1975).

In August 1975 Lloyd left Railroad Gin due to throat problems and to pursue her solo career. By the end of the year she had formed Tonnage, which was soon renamed as The Carol Lloyd Band. The line-up was Lloyd on lead vocals and percussion, Gary Broadhurst on bass guitar, Peter Harvey on keyboards, Mark Moffatt on lead guitar and pedal steel guitar, and Danny Simpson on drums. They signed a worldwide recording contract with EMI Records - a first for an Australian artist. They had a hit in Queensland with "Storm in My Soul" and released an album, Mother Was Asleep at the Time, on 18 October 1976.

Tony Catterall of The Canberra Times was impressed by Lloyd "[who] is a blues singer and, being part of the seventies, she's singing in the most acceptable blues style of today; the southern US sound pioneered by the Allman Brothers Band." The album was produced by Clive Shakespeare (ex-Sherbet), Catterall observed "on many of the 10 tracks – [Shakespeare is] refusing to let her be out front where a blues shouter belongs or by use of double tracking or echo chamber. The resultant sound isn't exactly displeasing, but it isn't true, either... her power and that of her band, has been too often diluted on 'Mother' by Shakespeare's wrong-headed approach."

=== 1980s ===
Carol Lloyd issued a solo album, Take It or Leave It, in 1980 on RCA, which provided the title track as its lead single in January of the following year. Lloyd was co-writer of the theme song for World Expo 88, "Together, We'll Show the World".

=== 2010s ===
Lloyd performed a series of shows at the Brisbane Powerhouse: "It Takes Two, Baby" with Sue Ray in January 2014, "It Takes Two Baby" with Pearly Black in July 2014, and "It's Time: the No.1 hits of Railroad Gin and The Carol Lloyd Band" in December 2014, at which the All The Good Things live album was recorded.

A benefit show was held for Lloyd at QPAC on 20 October 2016 to assist with medical expenses and artists including Katie Noonan, Alison St Ledger, Yani, Ellen Reed, Troy Cassar-Daley, Peter Harvey, Annie Petersen and Leah Cotterell donated their performances. The show was named Goodbye Ruby Tuesday after the Rolling Stones song frequently covered by Lloyd, and she made an appearance on stage in a decorated wheelchair to join Ellen Reed in performing it.

== Personal life ==
Carol Cramb had married Donald Lloyd and took his last name, but they separated by 1972, "I'd been married, my marriage had broken up, and I'd found my way back to where I was in my teens when I thought I was the only gay woman in the world." Prior to joining Railroad Gin she had worked in advertising, which had taken her to London.

Lloyd was diagnosed with a terminal illness, interstitial pulmonary fibrosis in January 2013. In December 2014 she described her symptoms "I have difficulty breathing if I get too excited. The disease was halfway up my lungs when I was diagnosed 18 months ago, probably more now. It creeps up your lungs and creates this crackling." Lloyd and her domestic partner, Annie, held a commitment ceremony on 10 August 2013 at The Edge, Queensland State Library, Brisbane during an event, "The Party of a Lifetime".

Carol Ann Lloyd died on 13 February 2017 at the Wesley Hospital, Auchenflower – due to complications from her fibrosis and chronic obstructive pulmonary disease.

== Discography ==
=== Studio albums ===
List of albums, with selected details and chart positions
Title	Album details	Peak chart positions
Title	Album details	AUS
Mother Was Asleep at the Time (as Carol Lloyd Band)	Released: October 1976; Format: LP, cassette; Label: EMI (EMA-321)	42

=== Singles ===
List of singles, with selected chart positions
Title	Year	Peak chart positions	Album
Title	Year	AUS	Album
"Storm in My Soul" (as Carol Lloyd Band)	1976	66	Mother Was Asleep at the Time
"All the Good Things"	1976	56	Mother Was Asleep at the Time
"Take It or Leave It" (as Carol Lloyd Band)	1980	—	Non-album single
"Love Me Tender" (with Sue Ray)	2013	—	It Takes Two, Baby (musical)

== Awards ==
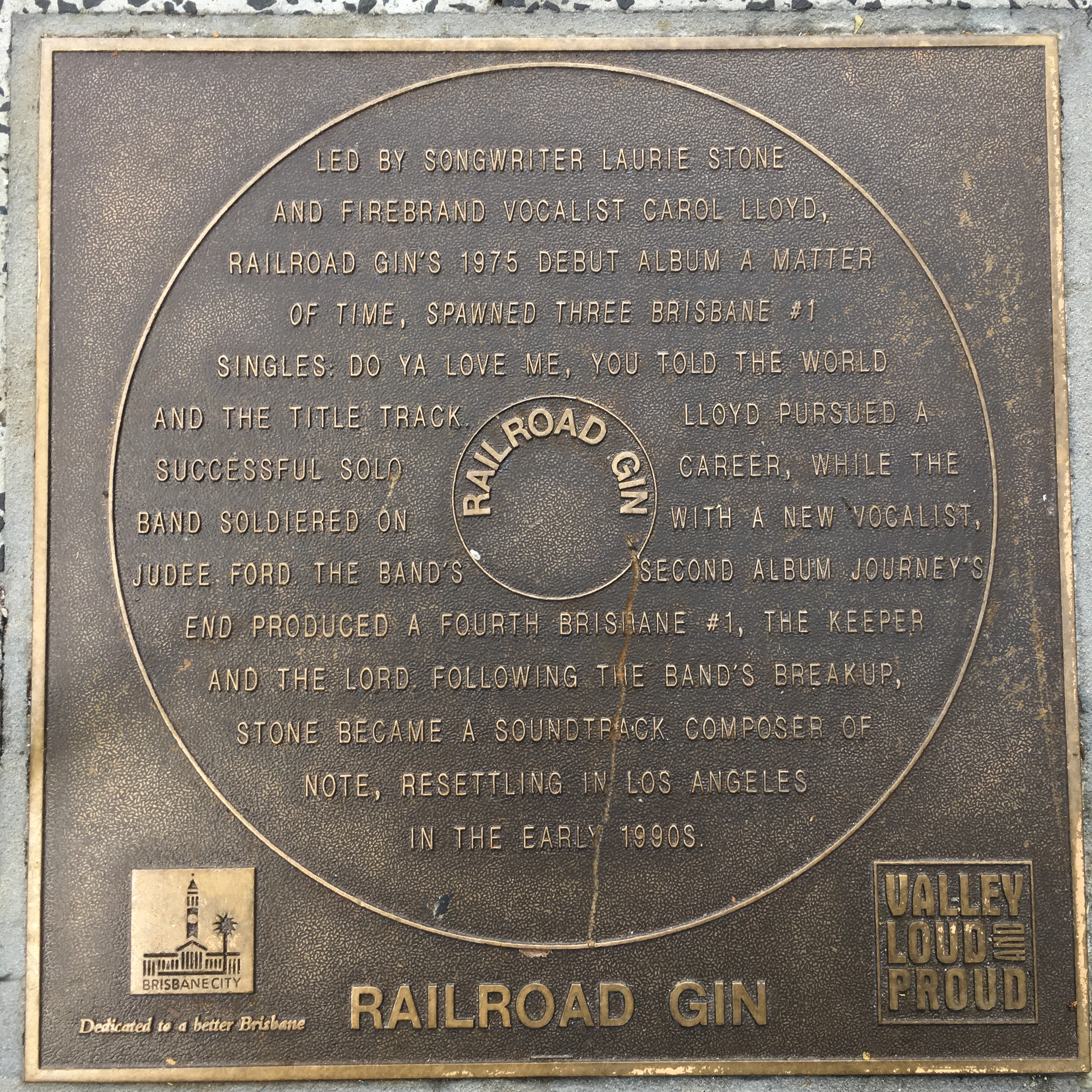
Plaque recognising band Railroad Gin, songwriter Laurie Stone and vocalists Carol Lloyd and Judee Ford, located on Brisbane's Walk of Fame in the Brunswick St Mall, Fortitude Valley.

=== Q Song Awards ===
The Queensland Music Awards (previously known as Q Song Awards) are annual awards celebrating Queensland, Australia's brightest emerging artists and established legends. They commenced in 2006.

Year	Nominee / work	Award	Result (wins only)
2010	Carol Lloyd	Grant McLennan Lifetime Achievement Award	awarded

In 2016 it was announced that the Queensland Music Festival and Queensland Government were creating an award in Carol's name to honour her lifetime achievements and support of up-and-coming female artists. The Carol Lloyd Award is worth $15,000 and was to be presented for the first time in 2017. The inaugural award was presented on 30 May 2017 to Georgia Potter (singer-songwriter with alternative rock/pop trio Moreton), who described herself as "a genuine Carol Lloyd fan", having attended Women In Voice concerts. In 2018 the winner of the Carol Lloyd Award was Leanne Tennant and in 2019 it was received by Sahara Beck.
