= Streetlife (Geeza album) =

Studio album by Geeza
- Released: March 1977
- Recorded: 1976–77; Atlantic Studios, Sydney
- Genre: Rock
- Length: 37:12
- Label: Living Sound, Laser, RCA
- Producer: Mario Millo

Singles from Streetlife
- 1. "Run 'n' Hide" Released: 1977; 2. "Song to Warilla" Released: 1977

Streetlife is the debut album by Australian rock group, Geeza. It was released in mid-1977 by Laser Records / RCA Records and was produced by Mario Millo. The first single, 'Run 'n' Hide', peaked at number 56 on the Australian Kent Music Report Singles Chart, while the second single, 'Song to Warilla', failed to chart.

== Background ==
Geeza was formed in Sydney's western suburbs in late 1973. Their cabaret-style theatrical performances included exploding phone boxes and other extravagant props that were used to win over audiences across Sydney. By September 1975, the band consisted of Gabriel Vendetti on guitar; Lee Martin (a.k.a. Martin Adamson) on bass guitar and backing vocals; Allan Fraiel on drums and backing vocals; and Terry Halliday (a.k.a. Terry Meaney) on lead vocals. The group started playing some songs in drag, which then led to the writing of the track "Dragon Queen" by Adamson, Venditti, Fraiel and Meaney.

Late in 1976, Geeza began recording their debut album, Streetlife, at Atlantic Studios, which was released in mid-1977. Streetlife spawned two singles, "Run 'n' Hide" and "Song to Warilla", the former peaked at number 56 on the Australian Kent Music Report Singles Chart. The album was produced by Mario Millo (ex-Sebastian Hardie, Windchase) at. "Run 'n' Hide" was written by Martin and the album was issued by Laser Records and RCA Records.

Immediately following the release of Streetlife, Martin departed the band and was replaced by Steve Gronow. Geeza then went on to support the Ted Mulry Gang on their three-month national tour, from April to June 1978. The group worked on a follow up album in 1979 but disbanded before it was finished.

== Track listing ==
Side one
No.	Title	Writer(s)	Length
1.	"Sydney City Ladies"	Martin Adamson, Gabriel Venditti, Allan Fraiel, Terry Meaney	4:51
2.	"You Can't Do That"	Adamson, Venditti, Fraiel, Meaney	4:02
3.	"Song to Warilla"	Adamson	4:48
4.	"StreetFighter"	Adamson, Venditti	4:38

Side two
No.	Title	Writer(s)	Length
5.	"Dragon Queen"	Adamson, Vendetti, Fraiel, Meaney	3:38
6.	"Run 'n' Hide"	Adamson	4:06
7.	"Too Much Goin' On Here"		3:42
8.	"The Jean Genie"	David Bowie	7:35

== Charts ==
Chart (1977)	Peak position
Australian (Kent Music Report)	79

== Personnel ==
Credits according to album notes.

Musicians

- Allan Fraiel – drums, backing vocals
- Terry Halliday – vocals
- Lee Martin – bass guitar, backing vocals
- Gabriel Venditti – guitar

Production

- Brian Bansgrove – cover lighting
- Alex Duyser – recording engineer
- Martin Fabinyi – art direction, art design
- Peter Hood – recording engineer
- Mario Millo – producer at Atlantic Studios, Sydney
- Philip Morris – photography
