= Railroad Gin =

Australian soul and R&B group

- Origin: Brisbane, Queensland, Australia
- Genres: Soul; R&B
- Years active: 1968–1977
- Label: Polydor
- Past members: Phil Shields; Glen Rickwood; Dimitri Jansons; Danny Murphy; Geoffrey Fitzgibbon; John Hunter; Selwyn Wright; Trevor Fielding; Bob Brown; Peter Evans; Gary Evans; Carol Lloyd; Laurie Stone; Judee Ford; Jim Dickson

Railroad Gin were an Australian soul and R&B group from Brisbane, formed in 1968. In 1970 they were joined by Laurie Stone on keyboards, vocals, saxophone and trombone. Carol Lloyd joined in 1970, becoming lead vocalist in September 1971.They released two albums on Polydor, A Matter of Time (1974) and Journey's End (1976), before disbanding in 1977. Australian musicologist, Ian McFarlane, observed, "[they] made an impact with its sweaty, full-tilt gigs and a commercial blend of soul, brassy R&B; and percussion-driven hard rock." Founding member Shields died in May 2006. Lloyd died in February 2017 of interstitial pulmonary fibrosis and chronic obstructive pulmonary disease, aged 68.

== History ==
=== 1968–1971: early years ===
Railroad Gin were formed in Brisbane in 1968 as a soul and R&B band. The initial line up was Phil Shields and Glen Rickwood on guitars, Dimitri Jansons on bass, Geoff Fitzgibbon on vocals and flute and Danny Murphy on drums. Fitzgibbon was their original vocalist.

Railroad Gin started out as a self styled soul and blues covers band noted for their energetic, entertaining performances. Early material contained a range of RnB material (Otis Redding, Wilson Pickett, Butterfield Blues Band, John Mayall's Bluesbreakers, and later: Jethro Tull, Joe Cocker, Rare Earth, The Band, Savoy Brown). The band encouraged interaction with their audiences and sought to entertain, eschewing the trend at the time for tedious, extended soloing. A feature of their act was their finale for every gig - an explosive rendition of Try a Little Tenderness in the spirit of Otis Redding.

Co-founders were cousins Phil Shields and Glen Rickwood. The school age Shields and Rickwood got together musically in 1964 but it wasn't until 1968, post school, that they resolved to form their own soul and blues band. Bass player and high school friend of Rickwood, Dimitri Jansons was immediately added - his inclusion a given. Next came Danny Murphy on drums followed by vocalist Geoffrey Fitzgibbon, the first and only singer tried. Fitzgibbon suggested the name Railroad Gin. A period of woodshedding followed.

Railroad Gin's first public performance was in early 1969 at The Open Door, Turbot Street, Brisbane, a warehouse space reinvented as a "drop in" centre where the principal entertainment was live music and new bands were welcomed. A number of Friday night and Saturday morning gigs followed, improving the band, and giving them confidence to approach the new owners of Quentins (Harry Guerin and Dick Greenup). Quentins (Wickham Street opp Centenary Park), formerly the Red Orb, was the mecca of RnB in Brisbane and had spawned such bands as Thursday's Children, the Coloured Balls and Light. Harry and Dick offered the Gin a spot at an upcoming all nighter at which their set was well received. They went on to become regulars and Orb favourites, as well as carving a niche on the wider Brisbane scene.

Drummers came and went. Danny Murphy was replaced by John Hunter, who was replaced by Selwyn Wright (ex Parade), who was replaced by Trevor Fielding (ex Einstein's Theory). Laurie Stone (ex The Touch) who worked with Rickwood joined in 1970 adding keyboards, sax, trombone and vocals, heralding a period of expansion. Shields took up trumpet, Fitzgibbon flute, Peter Evans joined adding vocals, harmonica, flute and sax, Bob Brown joined as percussionist. Carol Lloyd who worked with Fitzgibbon was invited to add vocals, former drummer Selwyn Wright would sit in on bongos and congas and Paul Murphy (ex Thursday's Children, Light) would guest on vocals and harmonica. Numbers on stage could swell to a dozen and gigs took on the nature of musical "events".

Continuing in this fashion Railroad Gin grew in reputation around Brisbane and its regions, playing most major venues, but in 1971 departures would necessitate a rethink. Rickwood left in mid 1971 followed shortly afterwards by Fitzgibbon. Carol Lloyd stepped up to become the primary vocalist, and the band moved on to a new era and a revised musical direction, with Carol front and centre.

=== 1972–1977: later years ===
By 1973 the line-up consisted of Gary Evans, Peter Evans, Jansons, Lloyd, Shields, Stone and Bob Brown. They were signed to Polydor Records and recorded their debut album, A Matter of Time (1974). Australian musicologist, Ian McFarlane, described how it, "featured a mixture of Shocking Blue, Jethro Tull and Steely Dan elements with its hard guitar/flute-driven sound." Its title track was issued as a single in June 1974, and reached No.1 on the local Brisbane charts. It was co-written by Lloyd and Stone. For the album, seven of nine tracks were written or co-written by Stone. Gary Evans (no relation to Peter) replaced Trevor Fielding on drums.

Two highlights from this period were their concerts in the Brisbane Botanic Gardens which drew record crowds and a Rock Mass performed at Brisbane's St John's Cathedral with the Queensland Youth Orchestra.

In May 1974 they supported Suzi Quatro's performance at Brisbane's Festival Hall. In August of the following year Lloyd left to pursue her solo career and was replaced on lead vocals by Judee Ford (ex-Tramway). The group undertook a tour of eastern capital cities and Adelaide. In December 1975 Jansons left and was replaced on bass guitar by Jim Dickson. The group's second album, Journey's End, appeared in October 1976, which McFarlane felt, "followed the formula set by the debut, but with a lighter, more polished Adult Oriented Rock (AOR) sound (somewhere between Chicago, Styx and Fleetwood Mac)."

Late in 1976 Roger Murray was on bass guitar and Col Wilson was on drums. Stone left the band early in the next year and they disbanded shortly after. McFarlane observed, "[they] made an impact with its sweaty, full-tilt gigs and a commercial blend of soul, brassy R&B; and percussion-driven hard rock." Stone formed a duo, Moscos and Stone, with Peter Moscos, which released a self-titled album in 1979. Stone later turned to soundtrack music for TV and films, including The Flying Doctors (from 1986). In the 1990s he relocated to Los Angeles. Founding member Phil Shields died in May 2006. Carol Lloyd died in February 2017 of interstitial pulmonary fibrosis and chronic obstructive pulmonary disease, aged 68.

== Discography ==
=== Studio albums ===
List of albums, with selected details and chart positions
Title	Album details	Peak chart positions
Title	Album details	AUS
A Matter of Time	Released: February 1975; Format: LP, cassette; Label: Polydor (2907 014)	35
Journey's End	Released: October 1976; Format: LP, cassette; Label: Polydor (2907 025)	—

=== Singles ===
List of singles, with selected chart positions
Title	Year	Peak chart positions	Album
Title	Year	AUS	Album
"Matter of Time"	1974	47	A Matter of Time
"Do Ya' Love Me" / "The Academy Rock"	1974	59	Non-album singles
"You Told the World"	1975	53	Non-album singles
"The Keeper and the Lord"	1975	—	Non-album singles
"Journeys End"	1976	53	Journey's End
