= The Bhagavad Guitars =

- Also known as: Inner Circle
- Origin: Sydney, New South Wales, Australia
- Genres: Indie rock; pop
- Years active: 1987–1998; 2008–2012
- Labels: Red Eye/Polydor; Karmic Hit/Shock
- Past members: Jeremy Butterworth; Kynan Hughes; John Kilbey (a.k.a. John Underwood); Matt Kerr; Adrian Workman; Tony Locke

The Bhagavad Guitars were an indie-rock band which formed in 1985 as Inner Circle in Canberra by Jeremy Butterworth on guitar and vocals, Kynan Hughes on bass guitar and Matt Kerr on drums and John Kilbey (under the pseudonym, John Underwood, for their first three releases to distance himself from brother Steve Kilbey and his band, the Church) on guitar and vocals. Hughes was replaced successively by Adrian Workman and then by Tony Locke. They recorded three 12 inch extended plays for Red Eye before recording a studio album, Introversion, in 1991 which was shelved due to record company disputes until July 1996. Meanwhile, they issued their first album, Hypnotised, in May 1992 via Karmic Hit/Shock, and disbanded in 1998. The group reformed in 2008 to record a new album, Unfamiliar Places, released in May 2011.

== History ==
The Bhagavad Guitars were formed in 1985 as Inner Circle in Canberra by Jeremy Butterworth on guitar, vocals and flute, John Underwood (a.k.a. John Kilbey) on guitar and vocals, Kynan Hughes on bass guitar and Matt Kerr on drums. As teenagers they had played together in a band while students at Dickson College. In 1987 they relocated to Sydney and renamed themselves, the new name, "was derived from a pun on the title of the Hindu book Bhagavad Gita." Butterworth later reflected, "We started off seriously interested in Eastern thinking, different philosophies, meditation... etc but now we're more cynical."

In July 1988 they released their debut five-track extended play, Foreverglades, which was produced by the Church's Steve Kilbey (Underwood's older brother) for Red Eye Records. Its "featured track, 'Just to Be Sure' became a radio hit in Sydney." They followed in October with a six-track EP, Headland, where Hughes had been replaced on bass guitar by Adrian Workman.

Red Eye compiled the two EPs, leaving off "Shrine" from Headland, into a full-length album, also titled, Foreverglades, in July 1990. They followed with a third EP, Party, with six tracks, in October of that year. Australian musicologist, Ian McFarlane, observed, "The band's brand of spacious, chiming guitar-based pop called to mind the likes of The Crystal Set, The Church and UK band Simple Minds."

The group's album, Introversion, was recorded in 1991 but did not appear until July 1996 on Karmic Hit/Shock Records. It included, "a bonus 14-minute CD EP Extraversion." The album was engineered and co-produced with legendary Australian, Tony Cohen (Nick Cave and The Bad Seeds). In 1992 Kilbey formed a record label, Karmic Hit, which issued the group's single, "Hypnotise Me" in February. They followed with their first studio album, Hypnotised, in May 1992 with Tony Locke on bass guitar and lead vocals for two tracks, "Romeo Error" and "Accident".

After the Bhagavad Guitars separated, Kilbey released three solo albums, Nothing More Than Something to Wear (February 2003) as John Kilbey, Catching Some Z's (2004) as J.L.K. and Good Fortunes (March 1999) by the Penny Drops. Kilbey was part of a band, Warp Factor 9, which released an album, 5 Days in a Photon Belt, in 1993.

The Bhagavad Guitars reformed in 2008 and released another album, Unfamiliar Places, in May 2011.

== Discography ==
=== Albums ===
- Foreverglades (compilation album, July 1990) – Red Eye/Polydor (RED LP 10, RED CD 10)
- Hypnotised (May 1992) – Karmic Hit
- Introversion (July 1996) – Karmic Hit/Shock Records (KH004/005)
- Unfamiliar Places (May 2011) – Karmic Hit

=== Extended plays ===
- Foreverglades (1988) – Red Eye/Polydor
- Headland (1988) – Red Eye
- Party (1990) – Red Eye

=== Singles ===
- "Hypnotise Me" (February 1992) – Karmic Hit
