= Red Eye Records (label) =

Independent record label started in 1985

Red Eye Records

Red Eye Records was an independent record label started in 1985 in the rear of the pre-existing record store of the same name in Sydney, Australia. It had two sub-labels Black Eye Records and Third Eye. The label functioned independently for 5 years before entering into a joint venture with Polydor / PolyGram records. The partnership functioned successfully for six years achieving accredited Gold & Platinum sales for some artists that wouldn't otherwise have been possible without the joint venture arrangement. The partnership was amicably dissolved at the end of 1996 with label founder John Foy retaining ownership of the Red Eye Label company structure, as he does to the present. Some of the more successful Red Eye Artists continue to this day, either within their groups or as solo Artists. In 2018 Foy released his Snaps Crack Pop! book, a music career memoir of sorts also containing images from his parallel graphic career as Skull Printworks. The current owners of the Red Eye Label repertoire, Universal Music, have recently embarked on a program of issuing Red Eye's finest moments on vinyl, most for the first time in that again popular format.

== Artists ==
- James Baker Experience
- Beasts of Bourbon
- The Bhagavad Guitars
- The Clouds
- The Cruel Sea
- The Crystal Set
- Curious (Yellow)
- Deniz Tek
- Drop City
- Jack Frost
- Spencer P. Jones
- John Kennedy's Love Gone Wrong

== See also ==
- Red Eye Records (store)
