= Dirty Pretty Things discography =

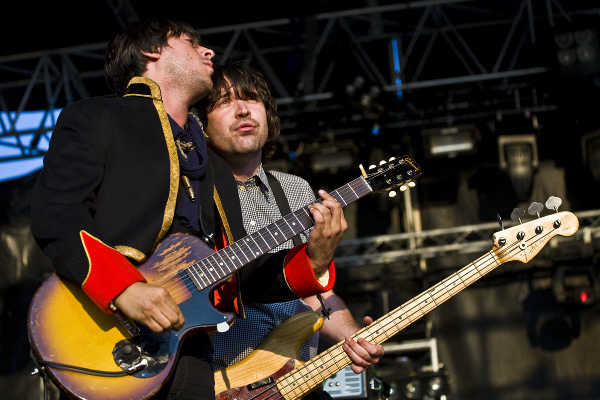
- Studio albums: 2
- Singles: 5
- Video albums: 1
- Music videos: 6

This is a comprehensive discography of Dirty Pretty Things, an English band fronted by Carl Barât, a member of The Libertines. The band released 2 studio albums and 4 singles but split up in 2008.

== Studio albums ==
Title	Album details	Peak chart positions										Certifications (sales thresholds)
Title	Album details	UK	AUT	BEL (FL)	EU	FRA	GER	IRE	JPN	SCO	US	Certifications (sales thresholds)
Waterloo to Anywhere	Release date: 8 May 2006; Label: Mercury/Vertigo Records; Format: CD, vinyl, digital download	3	—	78	10	53	43	22	—	3	200	BPI: Gold
Romance at Short Notice	Release date: 30 June 2008; Label: Mercury Records; Format: CD, vinyl, digital download	35	52	—	—	130	—	—	71	36	—	
"—" denotes releases that did not chart

== Singles ==
Title	Year	Peak chart positions					Certifications	Album
Title	Year	UK	EUR	IRE	POL	SCO	Certifications	Album
"Bang Bang You’re Dead"	2006	5	8	44	41	5	BPI: Silver	Waterloo to Anywhere
"Deadwood"	2006	20	—	—	—	11		Waterloo to Anywhere
"Wondering"	2006	34	—	—	—	21		Waterloo to Anywhere
"Tired of England"	2008	54	—	—	—	9		Romance at Short Notice
"Plastic Hearts"	2008	—	—	—	—	—		Romance at Short Notice
"—" denotes releases that did not chart

== Other charting songs ==
Title	Year	Peak chart positions	Album
Title	Year	UK DL	Album
"Gin & Milk"	2006	74	Waterloo to Anywhere

== DVDs ==
Title	Album details	Peak chart positions
Title	Album details	UK DVD
Puffing on a Coffin Nail - Live at the Forum	Released: 2006; Label: Vertigo Records; Format: DVD	8

== Music videos ==
Song	Year
"Bang Bang You’re Dead"	2006
"Deadwood"	2006
"Wondering"	2006
"Blood Thirsty Bastards"	2006
"Last of the Small Town Playboys"	2006
"Tired of England"	2008
