= The Chavs =

UK musical group

- Origin: London, England
- Genres: Post-punk revival, garage punk, garage rock, indie rock, hard rock
- Years active: 2004–2023 · 2025
- Label: Unsigned
- Spinoffs: Sex Pistols, Generation X
- Spinoff of: The Libertines, Dirty Pretty Things, The Charlatans, Primal Scream, Razorlight, Klaxons, Hatcham Social
- Members: Billy Idol; Paul Cook; Steve Jones; Tony James
- Past members: Carl Barât; Tim Burgess; Andy Burrows; Jamie Reynolds; Steffan Halperin; Didz Hammond; Anthony Rossomando; Gary Powell; Finnigan Kidd; Martin Duffy

The Chavs is an English rock supergroup band originally formed in London in 2004, by former Libertines and Dirty Pretty Things guitarist Carl Barât. Alongside Barât in the band are Tim Burgess of The Charlatans and drummer Andy Burrows from Razorlight. They made their live debut at Chatham's Tap'n'Tin, in December 2004, where the set included the Libertines songs "Death On the Stairs", "France" and "Road To Ruin", the Charlatans' "A Man Needs To Be Told" and "North Country Boy", Burgess' solo song "I Believe In The Spirit" and festive songs including a cover of "Fairytale of New York" by The Pogues.

The Tap'n'Tin is the same venue the Libertines played on the night after Pete Doherty was released from prison for burgling Barât's flat in 2003.

== Performances ==
The band also played the launch of Alan McGee's Death Disco TV, which was shown on Rockworld TV in July 2007. For the gig Burgess, Barât and Duffy were joined by Jamie Reynolds and Steffan Halperin from the Klaxons and Didz Hammond, Gary Powell and Anthony Rossomando from Dirty Pretty Things. The set drew from all three bands' material with "Golden Skans", "North Country Boy" (which merged into a cover of The Rolling Stones classic "You Can't Always Get What You Want") and "Bang Bang You're Dead" all featuring, as well as their own song "Kickin' Against The Pricks", which name-checks the Tap'n'Tin.

The band appeared in almost full format at the 2007 Glastonbury Festival in Lost Vagueness; with Carl, Jamie and Tim. The band was missing Martin Duffy and Andy Burrows but were assisted by Anthony Rossomando, Didz Hammond and Gary Powell in their place. The band appeared on an open mic stage and turned up wearing fancy dress; only revealing themselves after one song.

== Recordings ==
Tim Burgess has stated that the band had planned to record an "avant-garde" debut album in August 2008. Their official Myspace page claimed that they have one already written and rehearsed a single they hope to release in the future called 'I Always Crack a Smile', but this now seems unlikely due a lack of activity from the band.

== Personnel ==
Current lineup

- Billy Idol – lead vocals (2024–present)
- Paul Cook – drums (2024–present)
- Steve Jones – lead guitar, backing vocals (2024–present)
- Tony James – bass, backing vocals (2024–present)

Former members

- Carl Barât
- Tim Burgess
- Andy Burrows
- Anthony Rossomando
- Gary Powell
- Martin Duffy
- Didz Hammond
