= The Damn Personals =

The Damn Personals were a Boston-based rock band that existed from mid-1998 until late 2005. The concept was the brainchild of singer/guitarist Ken Cook and guitarist Anthony Rossomando. After several false starts, they finalized their line-up in the summer of 1998, with the addition of Jim Zavadoski on bass and drummer Mike Gill, who had both played in previous bands with Cook and Rossomando respectively.

The band quickly made a name for themselves within the east coast indie and garage-rock scenes of the time, becoming known as much for their earnest, catchy songs and unique arrangements as they were for their rambunctious live shows.

In the fall of 1998, Mike Gill's friend and house mate Chase Lisbon (now of Supercult) allied his screen printing business with locally based indie record label Big Wheel Recreation. While silk screening T-shirts, Chase played Big Wheel Recreation's owner, Rama Mayo, The Damn Personals' recently completed 4 song demo. Rama became a quick fan, and asked Gill to arrange a meeting with his band to discuss a record contract.

The resulting 2 album deal would yield The Damn Personals' 1999 debut, "Driver, Driver" (with producer Darron Burke) and 2002's follow-up album, "Standing Still In The USA" (with producer Michael Deming).

From 1999 until 2005, the band toured the US a dozen or so times, often performing with notable acts such as Piebald, The Explosion, The Mooney Suzuki, Radio 4, Ted Leo and The Pharmacists, The Strokes, The Walkmen, Jimmy Eat World and The Hives. They toured Europe and the UK once, when they were invited to be the support act for fellow Boston band, Cave In, on a spring 2003 tour.

In mid-2003, Jim Zavadoski left the band and was replaced by ex-Nigel 6 member, Mike Faulkner. Later that year, the band became label-less with the dissolution of Big Wheel Recreation. 2004 would see Ken Cook's relocation to New York City, and increasingly frequent requests from England's The Libertines for Anthony to fill in for their notoriously awol member, Pete Doherty.

Regardless of the disarray, the band recorded an album titled "The World Will End" with producer Andrew Schneider. This would become their final record.

The Damn Personals decided to call it quits in late 2005, playing their final show on New Year's Eve, ushering in 2006 and a new era.

Anthony formed Dirty Pretty Things with Libertines members Carl Barat and Gary Powell. Jim Zavadoski joined Boston's The Snowleopards. Ken Cook took up keyboard duties for Brooklyn's Weird Owl, a band fronted by former Damn Personals tour manager, Trevor Tyrrell. Michael Gill formed The Murder Mile with his old friend, former Spring Heeled Jack and Lost City Angels frontman, Ron Ragona. Michael Faulkner joined the Murder Mile in the summer of 2008.

In late 2007, The Damn Personals final album, "The World Will End," was released exclusively online for internet download.

In September 2011, it was announced that the Damn Personals will reunite for a 10/20/11 show at Webster Hall in NYC, within a Fenway Recordings CMJ showcase headlined by their friends, We Are Scientists.

Drummer Mike Gill died unexpectedly on May 6, 2022.

== Members ==
- Ken Cook (vocals, guitar)
- Mike Gill (drums)
- Anthony Rossomando (guitar)
- Mike Faulkner (bass guitar, 2003–2005)
- Jim Zavadoski (bass guitar, 1998–2003)

== Releases ==
The band released two full-length records for Big Wheel Recreation.

Driver/Driver (1999) Produced by Darron Burke at Makeshift Studio.

Standing Still In the USA (2002)

In 2005, The Damn Personals recorded and completed a full-length record titled The World Will End which is available for download at: .
