= Wondering (Dirty Pretty Things song) =

Single by Dirty Pretty Things

from the album Waterloo to Anywhere
- Released: 25 September 2006
- Recorded: 2005
- Genre: Garage Rock
- Length: 2:54
- Label: Mercury Records
- Songwriter(s): Carl Barât, Didz Hammond, Gary Powell, Anthony Rossomando
- Producer(s): Dave Sardy

Dirty Pretty Things singles chronology
"Deadwood" (2006)	"Wondering" (2006)	"Tired of England" (2008)

"Wondering" is a song by the band Dirty Pretty Things. It was released as a single on 25 September 2006 and was the third to be released from the band's debut album Waterloo to Anywhere. Early versions were generally titled "If You Were Wondering", the single-word title being settled upon for the final release of the album.

== Single track listings ==
=== CD ===
1. "Wondering"
2. "No Signal. No Battery" (Demo)
3. "The Gentry Cove" (Live)
4. "Wondering" (Video)

=== 7" (1) ===
1. "Wondering"
2. "Chinese Dogs" (Demo)

=== 7" (2) ===
1. "Wondering"
2. "Last Of The Small Town Playboys" (Live At 02 Wireless Festival)

== Chart performance ==
Chart (2006)	Peak position
UK Singles Chart	34
