= Tired of England =

Single by Dirty Pretty Things

from the album Romance at Short Notice
- Released: 23 June 2008
- Genre: Indie rock
- Label: Vertigo
- Songwriter(s): Carl Barât, Didz Hammond, Gary Powell, Anthony Rossomando

Dirty Pretty Things singles chronology
"Wondering" (2006)	"Tired of England" (2008)

Tired of England is the first single from Romance at Short Notice, the second album by Dirty Pretty Things, which was released on 23 June 2008.

The chorus is reminiscent of Panic by The Smiths.

The video for the song is a reference to the 1973 cult British movie The Wicker Man.

It was leaked at high quality onto networking peers on 10 May 2008.

The single was first played by Zane Lowe on his Radio 1 show on 13 May 2008.

== Single track listings ==
=== 7" (Gatefold Sleeve) ===
1. "Tired of England"
2. "The Weekenders"

=== 7" (Coloured Vinyl) ===
1. "Tired of England"
2. "Run Fat Boy Run"

=== CD ===
1. "Tired of England"
2. "Holly Golightly"
