= Deadwood (Dirty Pretty Things song) =

2006 single by Dirty Pretty Things

Single by Dirty Pretty Things

from the album Waterloo to Anywhere
- Released: 10 July 2006
- Length: 2:31
- Label: Mercury
- Songwriters: Carl Barât, Didz Hammond, Gary Powell, Anthony Rossomando
- Producer: Dave Sardy

Dirty Pretty Things singles chronology
"Bang Bang You're Dead" (2006)	"Deadwood" (2006)	"Wondering" (2006)

"Deadwood" is a song by English band Dirty Pretty Things. It was released as a single on 10 July 2006 and was the second to be released from the band's 2006 debut album, Waterloo to Anywhere. The band recruited fans via their web site to appear for the filming of the video, which occurred on a farm in the Essex countryside on Tuesday 16 May. In 2006, the song was used as the theme tune to Russell Brand's Got Issues, and later The Russell Brand Show.

== Video ==
The full, uncensored video directed by Barney Clay is available on the band's website. The video was censored for television due to nudity and other mature thematic elements.

== Track listings ==
7-inch

1. "Deadwood"
2. "Panic Attack" (Acoustic Paddingtons Cover)

CD

1. "Deadwood"
2. "Puffin On A Coffin Nail" (Demo)
3. "One To My Left"

DVD

1. "Deadwood" (music video directed by Barney Clay)
2. "Deadwood Diaries" (documentary directed by Goatie Lewis)
3. "You Fucking Love It" (live video directed by Goatie Lewis and filmed at The Basement Club, Buffalo Bar, Highbury, London, 23.3.06)

== Charts ==
Chart (2007)	Peak position
UK Singles (OCC)	20
