= Chavs =

Chavs may refer to:

- Chav, a British pejorative denoting class stereotype
- Chavs: The Demonization of the Working Class, a 2011 book by British writer Owen Jones
- The Chavs, British musical group
