= Bang Bang You're Dead (song) =

2006 single by Dirty Pretty Things

Single by Dirty Pretty Things

from the album Waterloo to Anywhere
- B-side: "Gin & Milk" (acoustic); "If You Were Wondering"
- Released: 24 April 2006
- Length: 3:35
- Label: Vertigo
- Songwriters: Carl Barât; Didz Hammond; Gary Powell; Anthony Rossomando
- Producer: Dave Sardy

Dirty Pretty Things singles chronology
"Bang Bang You're Dead" (2006)	"Deadwood" (2006)

"Bang Bang You're Dead" is a song by English band Dirty Pretty Things. It was released as the first single from the band's debut album, Waterloo to Anywhere (2006), on 24 April 2006. The song charted at number five on the UK Singles Chart and topped the NME chart in 2006. The same year, it was used as the theme tune to the BBC series Sorted.

Early rumours about the song claimed it was about Pete Doherty, citing the lyric "I gave you the Midas touch/You turned round and scratched out my heart". Carl Barât later affirmed this in an interview for Vulture.

== Track listings ==
UK maxi-CD single

1. "Bang Bang You're Dead"
2. "Gin & Milk" (acoustic version)
3. "If You Were Wondering" (Tavern version)

UK limited-edition 7-inch single

A. "Bang Bang You're Dead"
B. "If You Were Wondering" (acoustic version)

UK DVD single

1. "Bang Bang You're Dead" (video)
2. "Bang Bang Diaries" (documentary)
3. "Bang Bang You're Dead Demo" (Paris clip)
4. "Bang Bang You're Dead" (gallery)

== Charts ==
=== Weekly charts ===
Chart (2006)	Peak position
Ireland (IRMA)	44
Scottish Singles Sales (Official Charts)	5
UK Singles (Official Charts)	5

=== Year-end charts ===
Chart (2006)	Position
UK Singles (OCC)	97

== Certifications ==
Region	Certification	Certified units/sales
United Kingdom (BPI)	Silver	200,000^{‡}
^{‡} Sales+streaming figures based on certification alone.
