= Carl Barât (album) =

Studio album by Carl Barât
- Released: October 4, 2010
- Studios: Miloco The Square (Hoxton, UK); Cafe Music (London, UK)
- Genre: Rock
- Length: 35:53
- Labels: Arcady; PIAS
- Producer: Leo Abrahams

Carl Barât chronology
| Carl Barât (2010) | Let It Reign (2015) |

Singles from Carl Barât
- 1. "Run With The Boys" Released: 14 September 2010; 2. "So Long, My Lover" Released: 1 October 2010

Carl Barât is the eponymous debut solo studio album by English musician Carl Barât. It was released on 4 October 2010 through his own self-funded record label Arcady Records with distribution via PIAS Recordings. Recording sessions took place at Miloco Studios and Cafe Music in London. Production was handled by Leo Abrahams. The album peaked at number 52 on the UK Albums Chart. Its lead single, "Run With The Boys", made it to number 49 on the Official Independent Singles Chart in the UK.

Its release was timed to coincide with Barât's memoirs entitled Threepenny Memoirs.

== Critical reception ==
Professional ratings
Aggregate scores
| Source | Rating |
|---|---|
| AnyDecentMusic? | 5.8/10 |
| Metacritic | 58/100 |
Review scores
| Source | Rating |
| AllMusic | 2.5/5 stars |
| Gigwise | 3.5/5 stars |
| God Is in the TV | 4/5 stars |
| musicOMH | 2/5 stars |
| NME | 3/5 stars |
| NZ Herald | 3.5/5 |
| PopMatters | 6/10 |
| The Guardian | 2/5 stars |
| The Independent | 4/5 stars |

Carl Barât was met with mixed or average reviews from music critics. At Metacritic, which assigns a normalized rating out of 100 to reviews from mainstream publications, the album received an average score of 58, based on seven reviews. The aggregator AnyDecentMusic? has the critical consensus of the album at a 5.8 out of 10, based on seventeen reviews.

Andy Gill of The Independent praised the album, calling it "an unexpected delight". Gavin Haynes of NME stated: "more worryingly, there's a nagging sense that he's decided to dress it up in grandiose, emotive sentiments simply to camouflage a lack of real emotional investment". Crispin Kott of PopMatters wrote: "by comparison to his other post-Libertines musical efforts, it's the first real sign there's something more to Barât than what we've been led to believe". Gareth Ware of musicOMH concluded: "with its insipid, limp first half this is most certainly not the record to do it. The listening experience is made all the more irritating and frustrating given the sudden improvement in the final third of the record, but no part of it will ever be described as life changing or world-shattering". Will Dean of The Guardian resumed: "this self-titled snoozer misses any of the zip that made the Libs and, to an extent, erstwhile offshoot Dirty Pretty Things arresting".

== Track listing ==
| No. | Title | Writer(s) | Length |
|---|---|---|---|
| 1. | "The Magus" | Carl Barât; Andrew Wyatt | 3:16 |
| 2. | "Je Regrette Je Regrette" | Barât; Wyatt; Leo Abrahams | 3:05 |
| 3. | "She's Something" | Barât; Findlay Brown | 2:29 |
| 4. | "Carve My Name" | Barât; Davey Ray Moor; Abrahams | 4:33 |
| 5. | "Run with the Boys" | Barât; Moor | 3:24 |
| 6. | "The Fall" | Barât; Neil Hannon | 3:31 |
| 7. | "So Long My Lover" | Barât | 3:38 |
| 8. | "What Have I Done" | Barât; Wyatt | 3:42 |
| 9. | "Shadows Fall" | Barât; Moor | 4:16 |
| 10. | "Ode to a Girl" | Barât; Wyatt | 3:59 |
| Total length: | | | 35:53 |

== Personnel ==
- Carl Barât – vocals, electric guitar (track 2), guitar (tracks: 5, 7), guitar solo (track 8)
- Edie Langley – backing vocals (tracks: 1–3, 8–10)
- The Langley Sisters – backing vocals (track 7)
- Leo Abrahams – guitar (tracks: 1–8, 10), guitorgan (track 7), piano (tracks: 1, 2, 4–9), organ (tracks: 3, 5, 9), keyboards (tracks: 2, 10), minipiano (track 6), bass (tracks: 3–7), percussion (tracks: 2, 4, 5, 7, 8), omnichord (track 5), strings arranger (tracks: 4, 7, 8, 10), programming (tracks: 1, 10), Kaoss Pad (track 2), loops (track 4), producer, additional recording
- Findlay Brown – acoustic guitar (track 3)
- Ben Nichols – bass (tracks: 1, 2, 7–9)
- Andrew Wyatt – keyboards & programming (tracks: 1, 2, 10), strings arranger (track 10), mixing (tracks: 1–5, 7, 8)
- Seb Rochford – drums (tracks: 1, 2, 7–9)
- Phil Wilkinson – drums (tracks: 3–6, 10)
- David Coulter – percussion (track 1), banjo (track 6), talkbox (track 9)
- Amy Langley – cello (tracks: 4, 6, 9, 10), strings arranger (tracks: 8, 10)
- Gita Langley – violin (tracks: 4, 6, 9, 10), strings arranger (track 9)
- Rosie Langley – violin (tracks: 4, 6, 9, 10), strings arranger (track 9)
- Eleanor Stanford – violin (tracks: 4, 6, 9, 10)
- Sarah Sexton – violin (tracks: 4, 6, 9, 10)
- Úna Palliser – violin & viola (tracks: 7, 10)
- Louise Hogan – viola (tracks: 4, 6, 9, 10)
- Ben Castle – saxophone (track 5), horn (track 9)
- Chris Storr – trumpet (track 5), flugelhorn (track 9)
- Pete Whyman – flute & bass clarinet (track 6)
- Kate St John – oboe (track 6)
- Oli Wright – engineering
- Andy Tommasi – mixing (tracks: 6, 9, 10)
- Bryan Wilson – engineering assistant (tracks: 1, 5–10)
- Joseph Rodgers – engineering assistant (tracks: 2–4)
- Noel Summerville – mastering
- Toby Peacock – art direction
- Roger Sargent – design, photography

== Charts ==
| Chart (2010) | Peak position |
|---|---|
| Belgian Albums (Ultratop Wallonia) | 74 |
| French Albums (SNEP) | 67 |
| Scottish Albums (Official Charts) | 51 |
| UK Albums (Official Charts) | 52 |
| UK Album Downloads (Official Charts) | 52 |
| UK Independent Albums (Official Charts) | 4 |
