= Persia (EP) =

EP by The Church
- Released: August 1984
- Recorded: June–August 1984
- Studios: Studios 301, Sydney
- Genres: Alternative rock; neo-psychedelia; psychedelic rock; dream pop
- Length: 18:12
- Label: EMI Parlophone
- Producers: The Church, John Bee

The Church chronology
Remote Luxury (1984)	Persia (1984)	Heyday (1985)

Persia is the fourth extended play by the Australian psychedelic rock band the Church, which was released in August 1984. It was the follow-up to their earlier 1984 EP Remote Luxury, and continued in a similar stylistic vein.

The material from both five-track EPs was collected for international release on a compilation album, also called Remote Luxury, later in 1984. In 2001, EMI Australia released another compilation album, Sing-Songs//Remote Luxury//Persia (see also, Sing-Songs), which had remastered versions of all tracks from each of the three EPs, in their original running order.

== Background ==
The Church released two extended plays in 1984, Remote Luxury in March and Persia in August, but only in Australia and New Zealand. Both EPs reached the Top 50 on the Kent Music Report Albums Chart. Most of the tracks on Persia were written by lead vocalist Steve Kilbey. Compared to their third studio album, Seance, the atmosphere was lighter and less gloomy. The band's trademark guitar sound was complemented by the keyboards of Craig Hooper (from the Reels), who joined as an auxiliary touring member.

== Reception ==
Professional ratings
Review scores
Source	Rating
AllMusic	3/5 stars

Evan Cater of AllMusic observed that "it manages to draw from the best qualities of neo-psycheldelia and pop-rock without succumbing to the genres' respective pitfalls. It is atmospheric without being spacey or formless, catchy without being superficial, and mellow without being lethargic". Australian musicologist Ian McFarlane deemed it "excellent", noting that it "yielded such radiant Church moments as 'Constant in Opal' and 'Shadow Cabinet'".

== Track listing ==
1. "Constant in Opal" (Steve Kilbey) – 3:28
2. "Volumes" (Marty Willson-Piper) – 4:02
3. "No Explanation" (Kilbey) – 3:52
4. "Violet Town" (Kilbey) – 3:28
5. "Shadow Cabinet" (Kilbey, Peter Koppes, Richard Ploog, Willson-Piper) – 4:18

== Personnel ==
The Church

- Steve Kilbey: lead vocals, bass guitar, keyboards
- Peter Koppes: guitars, backing vocals
- Marty Willson-Piper: guitars, backing vocals, lead vocal on "Volumes"
- Richard Ploog: drums, percussion

Additional musicians

- Craig Hooper: keyboards
- Leon Zervos: sound effects

Production work

- Engineer: John Bee
- Mastering: Don Bartley at EMI Studios 301, Sydney
- Mixer: The Church, John Bee at EMI Studios 301, Sydney
- Producer: The Church, John Bee, recorded at EMI Studios 301, Sydney in June–August 1984
