= The Russell Brand Show (TV series) =

UK television series (2006–2006)

- Presented by: Russell Brand
- Theme music composer: Dirty Pretty Things
- Opening theme: "Deadwood"
- Country of origin: United Kingdom
- No. of episodes: 5 (list of episodes)

Production
- Running time: 60 minutes

Original release
- Network: Channel 4
- Release: 24 November – 22 December 2006

The Russell Brand Show is a chat show presented by Russell Brand. It aired on the British terrestrial TV channel Channel 4 and was broadcast on Friday nights. The programme featured Brand's take on current topics of conversation, a sketch on current topics, guest interviews and live music.

== Episodes ==
No.	Guests	Musical guest (song performed)	Original release date
1	Matt Lucas and David Walliams	Amy Winehouse ("You Know I'm No Good")	24 November 2006
2	Courtney Love and Katarina Waters	Morrissey ("I Just Want to See the Boy Happy")	1 December 2006
3	Peter Andre, Katie Price, and Emma Bunton	Primal Scream ("Country Girl")	8 December 2006
4	Sharon Osbourne and Matt Willis	Kasabian ("Me Plus One")	15 December 2006
5	Jade Goody, Reece Shearsmith, and Steve Pemberton	Dirty Pretty Things ("Bang Bang You're Dead") and ("Fairytale of New York")	22 December 2006

== Awards ==
At the 2006 Broadcasting Press Guild Awards, Brand won the award for best TV performer in a non-acting role.
