= The Russell Brand Show =

The Russell Brand Show is the name of several works:

- The Russell Brand Show (radio show), a radio show and podcast
- The Russell Brand Show (TV series), a television show
