= Nova Scotia (album) =

Studio album by Cousteau
- Released: April 18, 2005
- Recorded: London, England
- Genre: Indie
- Length: 41:36
- Label: Endeavour (UK); 602498711996; One Little Indian (U.S.); OLI728
- Producer: Ger McDonnell

Cousteau chronology
Sirena (2002)	Nova Scotia (2005)

Singles from Nova Scotia
- 1. "Sadness" Released: 2005

Professional ratings
Review scores
Source	Rating
Allmusic	3.5/5 stars
Musicomh	(favourable)

Nova Scotia is the third album by Cousteau, released in 2005 on the Endeavour record label. It was subsequently released in the U.S. under the band name 'Moreau' for legal reasons on the One Little Indian label with two additional tracks (*). The US release also featured new artwork.

Davey Ray Moor had previously left the band leaving the main song writing duties to be taken over by lead singer Liam McKahey. "We thought it was the end and we were all feeling really emotional," says McKahey of Moor's departure. "But after a few pints, we'd decided to carry on and do it (the songwriting) ourselves. It was sink or swim, and we decided to swim."

== Track listing ==
=== European release ===
1. "Sadness" – 3:06
2. "Sometime" – 4:38
3. "She's Not Coming Back" – 4:56
4. "There She Goes" – 3:09
5. "To Sail Away" – 4:26
6. "Echoes" – 4:11
7. "Black Heart of Mine" – 6:35
8. "Highly" – 3:46
9. "Pia" – 2:32
10. "Happening" – 4:17

=== US release ===
1. "Sadness" – 3:06
2. "Sometime" – 4:38
3. "She's Not Coming Back" – 4:56
4. "Nova Scotia" - 3:30 *
5. "To Sail Away" – 4:26
6. "There She Goes" – 3:09
7. "Black Heart of Mine" – 6:35
8. "A World Away" - 3:44 *
9. "Highly" – 3:46
10. "Happening" – 4:17
11. "Pia" – 2:32
- Both "Nova Scotia" and "A World Away" were also included on the Sadness single release.

== Personnel ==
- Liam McKahey - Vocals
- Joe Peet - Basses, Violin, Backing Vocals, Lead Vocal on "Sometime"
- Robin Brown - Guitars, Acoustic Guitar, Backing Vocals
- Tom Clues - Acoustic Guitar on "Sadness" and "Echoes"
- Dan Moore - Piano, Melodica, Solina Strings, Mini Moog and Backing Vocals
- Craig Veer - Drums and Percussion
- John Eato - Saxophones on "Sadness"
- Kirsa Wilkenschildt - Vibraphone on "Black Heart of Mine"
- Blair Jollands - Backing Vocals on "Black Heart of Mine"
