= Remote Luxury =

Remote Luxury may refer to:

- Remote Luxury (album), a 1984 album by The Church
- Remote Luxury (EP), a 1984 EP by The Church
