= Cousteau (band) =

English band

- Cousteau

Background information
- Origin: London, England
- Genres: Indie pop, chamber pop
- Years active: 1999–2005, 2016–2019, 2019-
- Labels: Global Warming, Palm Pictures, One Little Indian
- Members: Liam McKahey, Davey Ray Moor
- Past members: Dan Church, Robin Brown, Craig Vear, Joe Peet

Cousteau are a London-based band who enjoyed considerable international success, particularly in Italy and the U.S. from 1999 to 2005. The band's sound has been compared to Burt Bacharach, Scott Walker and David Bowie with an updated contemporary edge.

Their best known song remains the single "The Last Good Day of the Year", from their eponymous debut album. It has featured in advertisements (such as those for Nissan in the United States and Borsci in Italy), films (such as Happily Ever After, with Charlotte Gainsbourg, winner of the Special Selection category at the Toronto Film Festival 2005, and South Kensington with Rupert Everett) and documentaries and television programmes around the world. It also enjoyed radio play on both BBC Radio 1 and BBC Radio 2 in the UK, later becoming a staple of the NPR and AAA networks in the US.

== History ==
The initial release of the debut eponymous album was 'home-made' and included many demos turned down by various major labels. 3,000 copies of the album were pressed by indie label Global Warming. The album sold out after receiving rave reviews, including a 5-star review in Uncut magazine, and recommended album Time Out London. When the band signed to Chris Blackwell's Palm Pictures label a decision was made to re-record the majority of the album (two tracks, including 'Last Good Day of the Year', were not changed). On re-release in 2000, the album was Album Of The Week in The Guardian in the UK, and went on to sell more than 300,000 copies internationally. The album remains at #23 in Uncut's Highest Rating Albums of All Time.

Cousteau receiving gold disc award Cobden Club, 13 March 2002.

The band achieved gold-record status in Europe after years of consistent touring and promotion, including tours supporting The Dandy Warhols, David Gray, and Goldfrapp. Notably the band sold out iconic The Troubadour in Los Angeles, headlining on three separate occasions during the period 2001-2003. Fans of the band include Heath Ledger, Radiohead and David Byrne; Byrne attending two New York shows in 2002 and 2003.

In 2002 the second album, Sirena, was released; the version released in the US included a DVD with videos and unreleased live songs. This album sold over 90,000 copies, and contains the singles 'Talking to Myself' and '(Damn These) Hungry Times'. Sirena was met with critical acclaim from the likes of Rolling Stone, USA Today and Billboard, and most notably a 2-page colour feature in The New York Times. In 2005 Sirena was awarded Classic Album status in The Sydney Morning Herald.

The band's line-up changed when songwriter/producer Davey Ray Moor left to pursue production jobs in Italy, such as the No. 4 album Dove Sei Tu for Cristina Dona, a solo album Telepathy released in Europe in the USA (included in Republica's Critics Top 100, 2004), and television & documentary soundtracks. Songwriting duties were taken on by main singer Liam McKahey, and after a change in record companies, the group returned in 2005 with the album Nova Scotia, produced by U2's engineer Ger McDonnel.

Lead singer Liam McKahey released a solo album in 2009 as 'Liam McKahey and the Bodies' entitled Lonely Road, and in 2014 released a second album entitled Black Vinyl Heart. McKahey also featured as the lead vocalist on Alessandro Magnanini's 2009 album Someway Still I Do for the tracks 'Livin' My Life', 'But Not For You' and the titular 'Someway Still I Do', and as the lead vocalist on Stephen Emmer's 2014 album International Blue for the tracks 'Blown Away', 'Song For A Deserted Wife' and 'Mama's Mad'.

The HBO network in the US has licensed Cousteau's earlier work, with their song 'Mesmer' appearing in a feature about Heidi Fleiss, and 'The Last Good Day of The Year' in the HBO film Tell Me You Love Me.

CousteauX

In 2016 it was announced that Liam McKahey and Davey Ray Moor were back in the recording studio and returning as CousteauX. To avoid legal complications with the litigious Cousteau Society, and to honour the new era, the band placed an X at the end of their name; Cousteaux being another popular French family name. The new CousteauX began with a sold-out debut at The Blue Note in Milan in May 2016. A new album (CousteauX) was released in September 2017 on Silent X Records to consistent international critical acclaim, including Album of The Year in Music Republic Magazine. The duo, augmented by Italian Musicians Lorenzo Corti, Marco Ferrara and Massimo Lorenzon performed gigs in the UK, Portugal and Italy including a sold-out night at the legendary 100 Club in London.

The latest album, Stray Gods, was released in August 2020, and the video 'When The Bloom Has Left The Rose' won dozens of international awards including Best Music Video at the 2020 London Independent Film Festival. 2022 saw Last Good Day of The Year sync'd with the hit US series Atlanta.

== Members ==
=== Current ===
- Liam McKahey – vocals, percussion, songwriter
- Davey Ray Moor – songwriter, producer, flugelhorn, piano, backing vocals

=== Former ===
- Robin Brown – guitars, backing vocals
- Joe Peet – bass, violin, backing vocals
- Dan Church – drums on the Global Warming Cousteau album
- Craig Vear – drums and percussion

=== Temporary ===
- Dan Moore (ex- Elevator Suite) - keyboards, melodica, backing vocals (replacement for Davey Ray Moore on 2002 US and Europe tours)
- Paul Wigens (ex- Grand Drive) - drums (replacement for Craig Vear on 2005 UK and Italy tours)
- Chloe March - keyboards (replacement for Davey Ray Moor on 2005 UK and Italy tours)

== Discography ==
=== Albums ===
- Cousteau – 1999, Global Warming Ltd (GLOB CD 5)
- Cousteau (reissue) – 2000, Palm Pictures Ltd (PALMCD 2058-2)
- Sirena – 2002, Palm Pictures Ltd (PALMCD 2083-2)
- Nova Scotia – 2005, Endeavur
- CousteauX – 2017, Silent X Records
- Stray Gods – 2021, Silent X Records

=== Singles (CD) ===
- "The Last Good Day Of The Year" 1999, Global Warming Ltd (WARM CD 6)
  The Last Good Day Of The Year (radio mix) / Captain Swing / Love In The Meantime / The Last Good Day Of The Year (album mix)
- "She Don't Hear Your Prayer" 2000, Palm Pictures Ltd (PPCD 7032-2)
  She Don't Hear Your Prayer / Lovers In A Loveless Place (Babyman Remix) / Late September Rain
- "The Last Good Day Of The Year" 2000, Palm Pictures Ltd (PPCD 7043-2)
  The Last Good Day Of The Year / Captain Swing / Rachael Lately
- "The Last Good Day Of The Year" (US promotional enhanced CD) 2001, Palm Pictures Ltd (PRCD v20581)
  The Last Good Day Of The Year / Mesmer / You My Lunar Queen / The Last Good Day Of The Year (video)
- "Into The Blue EP" (US promotional EP) 2001, Palm Pictures Ltd (PRCD v20583)
  She Don't Hear Your Prayer (live) / (Shades Of) Ruinous Blue (live) / Jump In The River (live) / Rachael Lately
- "Into The Blue EP" (Italian promotional EP) 2001, Nun Entertainment/Tutto magazine
  Heavy Weather (album version) / The Last Good Day of the Year (remix by Feel Good Production) / The Last Good Day of the Year (live) / She Don't Hear Your Prayer (live) / (Shades Of) Ruinous Blue (live) / Jump In The River (live)
- "Wish You Were Her" 2001, Palm Pictures Ltd (PPCD 7049-2)
  Wish You Were Her / To Know Her / The Cuttlefish Walks The Cuttlefish Waltz
- "Talking To Myself" 2002, Palm Pictures Ltd (PPCD 7074-2)
  Talking To Myself / Short Sighted, Beautiful And Shy / Last Secret Of The Sea
- "(Damn These) Hungry Times" 2002, Palm Pictures Ltd (PPCD 7089)
  (Damn These) Hungry Times (Bedroom Rockers Remix Radio Edit) / (Damn These) Hungry Times (album version) / Nothing So Bad
- "Heavy Weather" (Promo) 2002, Naïve / Palm Pictures Ltd (AVI 9012)
  Heavy Weather
- "Sadness" 2005, Endeavor (602498714133)
  Sadness / Nova Scotia / World Away
- "CouseauX" (CD-R & 10" vinyl EP) 2016, Edel / Silent X Records (0211206EIT / SNTX001)
  Sally Say You Will / Love Is Not On Trial / Eve Of War / When Saturday Comes / Spoiler
- "The Innermost Light" (Promo CD-R) 2017, Silent X Records (none)
  The Innermost Light (Radio Mix)

== Other contributions ==
- WYEP Live and Direct: Volume 4 – On Air Performances (2002) – "Last Good Day of the Year"
- KINK LIVE (2002) – "Last Good Day of the Year"
- Live @ The World Cafe Tenth Anniversary Edition (2001) – "Last Good Day of the Year"
- From the Mountain Music Lounge Volume 9 (2003) – "Last Good Day of the Year"
- City Folk Live IV (2001) – "Last Good Day of the Year"
- DETLIVE Vol 3 (2002) – "Your Day Will Come"
- Sounds Eclectic Too (2002) – "You My Lunar Queen"
- Sing a Song for You: Tribute to Tim Buckley (2002) – "Blue Melody"
