= Let It Reign =

Studio album by Carl Barât and the Jackals
- Released: 16 February 2015
- Studio: Los Angeles; London
- Genre: Rock
- Length: 35:31
- Label: Cooking Vinyl
- Producer: Davey Ray Moor; Joby J. Ford

Carl Barât chronology
Carl Barât (2010)	Let It Reign (2015)

Let It Reign is the debut studio album by English rock band Carl Barât and the Jackals. It was released on 16 February 2015 through Cooking Vinyl. Recorded in Los Angeles and London, it was produced by Joby J. Ford and Davey Ray Moor. The album debuted at number 47 on the UK Albums Chart.

== Critical reception ==
Professional ratings
Aggregate scores
Source	Rating
AnyDecentMusic?	6.5/10
Metacritic	67/100
Review scores
Source	Rating
AllMusic	3.5/5 stars
Consequence of Sound	C
DIY	1/5 stars
Drowned in Sound	5/10
Exclaim!	7/10
NME	4/5 stars
PopMatters	7/10
The Guardian	4/5 stars
The Observer	2/5 stars
Under the Radar	5.5/10 stars

Let It Reign was met with generally favourable reviews from music critics. At Metacritic, which assigns a normalized rating out of 100 to reviews from mainstream publications, the album received an average score of 67, based on sixteen reviews. The aggregator AnyDecentMusic? has the critical consensus of the album at a 6.5 out of 10, based on thirteen reviews.

Mark Beaumont of NME praised the album, calling it "the most electric and exuberant record he's made since Up the Bracket". Caroline Sullivan of The Guardian stated: "this feels like a placeholder for the forthcoming Libertines album, but, as placeholders go, it's a stormer". AllMusic's Heather Phares determined: "Let It Reign's appealing mix of nostalgia and vitality proves that Barât can not just survive, but thrive outside of the confines of his other, storied band". Lisa Sookraj of Exclaim! noted: "it's the slower, more "mature" tracks that disappoint here.... Still there's plenty to like on Let It Reign for Libertines fans missing that garage rock sound". Jeff Strowe of PopMatters wrote: "it's an affair that is much more snarling and punkish than solemn and introspective and one that appears to have been a good representation of what he had in mind".

In mixed reviews, Lily Moayeri of Under the Radar declared: "a return to the garage rock that has propelled most of his musical endeavors, the primary thrust of Let It Reign is guttural. There are, however, tempo and minor style changes along the way that stop the album from being one long string of yells". Dusty Henry of Consequence stated: "save for the singles, it all feels inconsequential. It plays more like a young band who grew up worshipping Up the Bracket, rather than identifying with the songwriter who helped forge the sound". Andrzej Lukowski of Drowned in Sound concluded: "as a warm up exercise for Barât's musical muscles and an honouring of a debt to The Jackals, Let It Reign is absolutely fine. But Libertines album number three will need to deliver a lot more than this". Phil Mongredien of The Observer resumed: "for the most part, these songs just sound as if they're being bashed out at a slower tempo".

Dan Owens of DIY gave the album one-out-of-five stars, admitting "Let It Reign's abrasiveness does little to deflect from its disappointing lack of ambition".

== Track listing ==
No.	Title	Writer(s)	Producer(s)	Length
1.	"Glory Days"	Carl Barât; Benjamin Biolay	Joby J Ford	3:42
2.	"Victory Gin"	Barât; Daniel Mills	Joby J Ford	3:54
3.	"Summer in the Trenches"	Barât; Mills	Joby J Ford	3:03
4.	"A Storm Is Coming"	Barât; Andrew Burrows	Joby J Ford	3:59
5.	"Beginning to See"	Barât; David Raymond Moore	Joby J Ford	3:47
6.	"March of the Idle"	Barât; Ed Harcourt	Joby J Ford	3:40
7.	"We Want More"	Barât; Anthony Rossomando	Davey Ray Moor	3:33
8.	"War of the Roses"	Barât; Mills	Joby J Ford	4:54
9.	"The Gears"	Barât; Billy Tessio; Drew McConnell; Jay Bone	Davey Ray Moor	1:32
10.	"Let It Rain"	Barât; Harcourt	Joby J Ford	3:27
Total length:				35:31

== Personnel ==
- Carl Barât – vocals, guitar (tracks: 1–6, 8, 10)
- Ray Suen – bass (tracks: 1–6, 8, 10), strings (tracks: 5, 10)
- Jarrod Alexander – drums (tracks: 1–6, 8, 10)
- Alfredo Ortiz – percussion (tracks: 1, 3, 4)
- Sara Bauza – trumpet (tracks: 2, 8)
- Joby J. Ford – additional background vocals (tracks: 3, 5), producer & engineering (tracks: 1–6, 8, 10), vocal editing (track 6)
- Billy Tessio – guitar (tracks: 7, 9)
- Drew McConnell – bass (tracks: 7, 9)
- Jay Bone – drums (tracks: 7, 9)
- Andrew Wyatt – piano (track 10)
- Beau Burchell – mixing
- Jonathan Gilmore – engineering (tracks: 7, 9)

== Charts ==
Chart (2015)	Peak position
Belgian Albums (Ultratop Wallonia)	152
French Albums (SNEP)	151
Scottish Albums (OCC)	49
UK Albums (OCC)	47
UK Album Downloads (OCC)	83
UK Independent Albums (OCC)	11
