= The Bottletop Band =

Indie rock supergroup

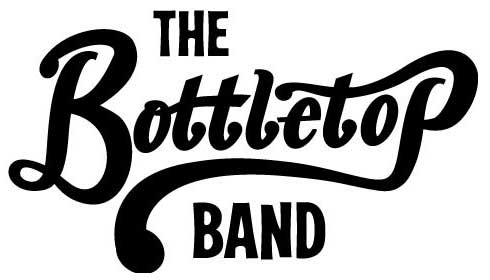

Background information
- Origin: England, Brazil
- Genres: Indie rock, Brazilian rock
- Years active: 2008–present
- Members: Eliza Doolittle; Gruff Rhys; Matt Helders; Andy Nicholson; Tim Burgess; Drew McConnell; VV Brown; Jon McClure; Carl Barât; Matt Park; Domenico; Kassin; Frank Benbini; Sam Duckworth; Fin Greenall; Sam Sparro
- Website: bottletopband.com

The Bottletop Band is a supergroup consisting of leading musicians of both Brazilian and English music. Mario Caldato Jr. is the prime organiser of the band, overseeing the whole Bottletop band record and he was behind the mixing and production of the majority of tracks. Notable musicians include Carl Barât, Eliza Doolittle, Gruff Rhys, Matt Helders, Andy Nicholson and Tim Burgess. Despite primarily being a jam band, the band was eventually organised to record an album, Dream Service, from which all proceeds have been given the Bottletop charity which supports initiatives in Brazil, Malawi and Rwanda and the UK, addressing key issues such as sexual and reproductive health, substance abuse and gender equality. The band's debut single, "The Fall of Rome", was made available in December 2010 for free download on the project's official website. The charity set up recording sessions at Dean Street Studios in Soho and in Rio de Janeiro with a wide variety of musicians to record a selection of ideas together under the stewardship of producer Jagz Kooner.

== Dream Service ==
The Bottletop Band's first single from Dream Service, "The Fall of Rome" includes Tim Burgess (The Charlatans) on vocals, Matt Helders (Arctic Monkeys) on drums, Andy Nicholson (Reverend and the Makers) on bass, with Drew McConnell (Babyshambles), Carl Barât (The Libertines) and Matt Park (The Noisettes) on guitar. A remix of the track by Evil 9 was made shortly made after the single's release.

It was to be the English musicians that recorded first before the Brazilian musicians. These 'loops and live jams' were then sent across to Rio de Janeiro for the local artists to add their ideas. The tracks were sent back and forth between the two countries, in a flurry of studio sessions with a host of singers, bands and session musicians until eventually resting with producer Mario Caldato Jr., in Los Angeles, having overseen the entire project, as he eventually pieced together the final material and mixed the tracks to create Dream Service, which consisted of ten songs altogether.

== Cause ==
The project raises funds and awareness through musical collaborations and is the latest musical initiative pioneered by the Bottletop charity – it follows in the wake of the Sound Affects album series. The first release, Africa consisted of rare afrobeat remixed by Paul Oakenfold and Quantic amongst others. The follow-up album, Brazil includes remixes composed by Fatboy Slim and Jazzanova, and garnered praise from the likes of The Independent, Bob Geldof and Michael Eavis.
