= Seance (album) =

Studio album by The Church
- Released: June 13, 1983
- Recorded: Spring 1983
- Studio: Studios 301 (Sydney)
- Genre: Alternative rock; neo-psychedelia; new wave; dream pop
- Length: 56:34
- Label: EMI Parlophone (Australia); Carrere (Europe); Arista (US/Canada reissue)
- Producer: The Church and John Bee

The Church chronology
Sing-Songs (1982)	Seance (1983)	Remote Luxury (1984)

Professional ratings
Review scores
Source	Rating
Allmusic	link
The Rolling Stone Album Guide	3/5 stars

Seance is the third album by the Australian psychedelic rock band The Church, released in 1983. More atmospheric and brooding than its predecessor The Blurred Crusade's jangling psychedelia and upbeat rock, it shows a greater use of keyboards, with the guitars taking largely textural roles on many songs. While numerous tracks have become fan favorites over the years, the album saw considerably less success in Australia than previous releases and had limited exposure internationally. Apart from the psychedelic noise experiment "Travel By Thought", which prefigures the band's extended improvised tracks of the 1990s and beyond, all songs were written solely by Steve Kilbey.

The album's most notorious aspect, both amongst the fan base and the band members themselves, is the heavy use of gated reverb on the drum sound, particularly on the single "Electric Lash" where the snare fills have been likened to a "machine gun". This was the work of mixing engineer Nick Launay who refused to remove the effect despite the disapproval of the band. Despite this frequent criticism, the tracks "One Day," "It's No Reason" and "Now I Wonder Why" are often considered stand-outs in the band's repertoire. The album yielded two minor hits - "It's No Reason" and "Electric Lash" - and stayed in the British independent charts for several months.

In 2002 the album was remastered and reissued by EMI Australia, with a second disc containing two bonus tracks and promo videos for "It's No Reason", "Electric Lash" and "Fly".

In 2010, Second Motion Records released a single disc remaster, including the two bonus tracks, as part of their 30th Anniversary Series.

== Track listing ==
All songs written by Steve Kilbey, except where noted.

1. "Fly" - 2:09
2. "One Day" - 4:37
3. "Electric" - 6:02
4. "It's No Reason" - 5:50
5. "Travel by Thought" (Kilbey/Koppes/Ploog/Willson-Piper) - 4:34
6. "Disappear?" - 5:47
7. "Electric Lash" - 4:24
8. "Now I Wonder Why" - 5:39
9. "Dropping Names" - 2:58
10. "It Doesn't Change" - 5:56
11. "Someone Special" - 4:10 (bonus track, originally the B-side of "It's No Reason")
12. "Autumn Soon" - 4:28 (bonus track, originally the B-side of "Electric Lash")

== Personnel ==
Credited to:

- Steve Kilbey: lead vocals, bass guitar, keyboards, string arrangements
- Peter Koppes: guitars, vocals, Hammond organ
- Marty Willson-Piper: guitars, vocals
- Richard Ploog: drums, bongos, tambourine

with

- Mikela Uniacke (a.k.a. Michelle Parker): backing vocals on "It's No Reason"
- Russell Kilbey: harmonica on "Now I Wonder Why"
