= Cristina Donà =

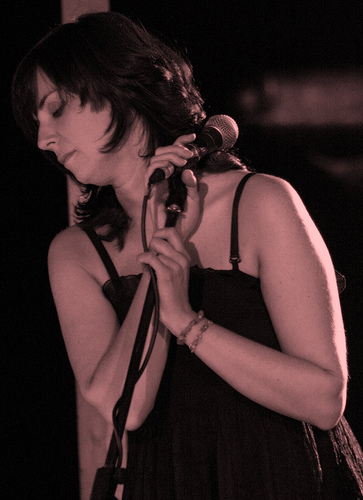
- Cristina Donà in 2006

Background information
- Born: Cristina Trombini; September 23, 1967; Rho, Italy
- Genres: Folk, rock, pop
- Occupation: Singer-songwriter
- Years active: 1991—present
- Labels: Mescal (1997—2006); EMI (2006—present)
- Website: www.cristinadona.it

Cristina Trombini (Italian pronunciation: [kriˈstiːna tromˈbiːni]; born September 23, 1967), known professionally as Cristina Donà (Italian: [kriˈstiːna doˈna]), is an Italian singer and songwriter.

== Life and career ==
She developed a passion for music since she was a teenager, her favorite singers being, among others, Bruce Springsteen, Sinéad O'Connor, Joni Mitchell, Michelle Shocked, Tom Waits, Lucio Battisti, and The Beatles. She studied at Accademia di Belle Arti di Brera in Milan, where, during a student protest in 1990, she met Manuel Agnelli, leader of the Italian indie rock band Afterhours. Later she started her own singing career opening Afterhours’ concerts in their During Christine's Sleep tour.

Besides live performances in clubs in Milan and surroundings, Donà, encouraged by Manuel Agnelli, began working on her own songs, and released her first album, Tregua, in 1997. The album was an immediate success. Robert Wyatt included it among his favorites of the year in Mojo. The music critic Charlie Gillett broadcast some songs on BBC Radio.

In the meanwhile, Donà performed live on an Italian tour, and opened concerts for Ben Harper and David Byrne.

In 1999, she duetted with the songwriter Eric Wood in his album Illustrated night, and started working on the second album, Nido. Robert Wyatt contributed to this album with the arrangements in the song Goccia and with the participation in a videoclip, shot on the East Coast of England, and released on the Goccia EP. In 2001 Donà was invited (the first and only Italian artist then) to the Meltdown Festival, where she performed the same night as Anja Garbarek and Mark Eitzel. Davey Ray Moor, attending the concert that night, was very much impressed by Donà’s performance, and this was the starting point of a long-lasting collaboration between the two artists. While working with him on the third album, in January 2002 Donà was invited to participate in the Eurosonic Festival in Groningen (The Netherlands).

The third album, Dove sei tu, was released in 2003, and Davey Ray Moor performed as a special guest in some concerts during the promotional tour. Donà recorded a cover of Kate Bush’s Wuthering Heights, which was included in the single Invisibile. She also worked, together with Davey Ray Moor, on the translation of the lyrics of Dove sei tu. The self-titled album was released in 2004 and distributed in 33 countries by Rykodisc International.

The English press welcomed the album with very good reviews. Mojo gives it four stars, Down Beat compared Donà to artists such as Marianne Faithfull and Ute Lemper, Sunday Times included a song in the monthly CD attached to the magazine.

At the end of 2004, she started an extensive tour of Europe, performing in Germany, France, UK, Belgium, The Netherlands, Sweden, and with a special performance at the Polar Spectacle Festival in Norway. The American musician Ken Stringfellow played with her in most of the European concerts.

In 2005, she played in Italy with Annie Whitehead’s Soupsongs, and was in the UK for an acoustic tour, during which she was invited to Robert Elms’ BBC London Live.

In 2006, she signed to the major label EMI that is re-distributing all her catalogue.

In 2014, she came back from her last album Torno A Casa A Piedi (2011) with a new work called Così Vicini.

== Discography ==
=== Albums ===
- 1997 – Tregua
- 1999 – Nido
- 2003 – Dove sei tu
- 2004 – Cristina Donà (in English)
- 2007 – La quinta stagione
- 2008 – Piccola faccia
- 2011 – Torno a casa a piedi
- 2014 – Così vicini

=== Singles ===
- 2003 – Nel mio giardino
- 2003 – Triathlon
- 2003 – Invisibile
- 2004 – Invisible girl
- 2007 – Universo
- 2008 – Sign your name
- 2008 – I duellanti
- 2010 – Miracoli
- 2011 – Un esercito di alberi
- 2014 – Così vicini
