= Waterloo to Anywhere =

Studio album by Dirty Pretty Things
- Released: 8 May 2006
- Genres: Garage rock revival post-punk revival
- Length: 36:34
- Labels: Mercury, Vertigo
- Producers: Dave Sardy, Tony Doogan

Dirty Pretty Things chronology
Waterloo to Anywhere (2006)	Romance at Short Notice (2008)

Professional ratings
Review scores
Source	Rating
Allmusic	4/5 stars
Blender	3/5 stars
The Guardian	3/5 stars
NME	(8/10)
Pitchfork Media	(7.0/10)
Q	3/5 stars
Rolling Stone	3.5/5 stars
Slant Magazine	4.5/5 stars

Waterloo to Anywhere is the debut album by English indie rock band Dirty Pretty Things, fronted by then former Libertine Carl Barât. The album was produced by Dave Sardy and Tony Doogan, and released on 8 May 2006 in the United Kingdom, where it debuted at #3 in the UK Albums Chart.

The album was leaked onto the internet in early April 2006. The cover and all artwork for the album was made by artist Hannah Bays.

== Track listing ==
1. "Deadwood" – 2:28
2. "Doctors and Dealers" – 3:18
  - The American edition of the album features this song at track 6.
3. "Bang Bang You're Dead" – 3:33
4. "Blood Thirsty Bastards" – 3:11
5. "The Gentry Cove" – 2:32
6. "Gin & Milk" – 3:06
  - The American edition of the album features this song at track 2.
7. "The Enemy" – 3:36
8. "If You Love a Woman" – 3:13
9. "You Fucking Love It" – 1:54
10. "Wondering" – 2:54
11. "Last of the Small Town Playboys" – 3:31
12. "B.U.R.M.A." (UK edition only) – 3:18
  - Not included on the British LP or the American release.

=== Japanese-edition bonus tracks ===
- "Gin & Milk" (acoustic version)
- "Wondering" (tavern version)

=== Limited-edition bonus 7-inch ===
A limited-edition version of the LP included an additional 7-inch with the following tracks.

1. "Bang Bang You’re Dead" (acoustic)
2. "B.U.R.M.A" – 3:18

=== Limited-edition bonus DVD ===
A limited-edition version of the CD included a DVD directed by Goatie Lewis with five live tracks from their concert at Macadam Building, King's College London, on 8 March 2006.

1. "The Enemy"
2. "Blood Thirsty Bastards"
3. "Gentry Cove"
4. "Bang Bang You're Dead"
5. "Last of the Small Town Playboys"

== Singles ==
The lead single from the album, "Bang Bang You're Dead", was released on April 24 and peaked at #5 in the UK Singles Chart. Second single "Deadwood" peaked at #20 upon its release on July 11. The third single from the album, "Wondering" was released on October 15 and peaked at #34 in the charts.

== Release details ==
Country	Date	Label	Format	Catalog
Japan	2006-05-03	Universal International, Vertigo Records	CD	UICR-1047 / 4 988005 426963
United Kingdom	2006-05-08	Mercury, Vertigo Records	LP	6 02498 56418 9
United Kingdom	2006-05-08	Mercury, Vertigo Records	CD	6 02498 53266 9
United Kingdom	2006-05-08	Mercury, Vertigo Records	CD / DVD	6 02498 56134 8
United States	2006-08-08	Mercury, Vertigo, Interscope Records	CD	B0007235-02 / 6 02498 57279 5
