= The Blurred Crusade =

1982 studio album by the Church

Studio album by The Church
- Released: 25 March 1982
- Recorded: 1981
- Studio: Studios 301 (Sydney)
- Genre: Alternative rock, psychedelic rock, new wave, dream pop
- Length: 44:22
- Label: EMI Parlophone (Australia); Carrere (Europe); Arista (US/Canada reissue)
- Producer: Bob Clearmountain

The Church chronology
Of Skins and Heart (1981)	The Blurred Crusade (1982)	Sing-Songs (1982)

Singles from The Blurred Crusade
- 1. "Almost with You" Released: March 1982; 2. "When You Were Mine" Released: May 1982

Professional ratings
Review scores
Source	Rating
AllMusic	4.5/5 stars
The Rolling Stone Album Guide	3/5 stars

The Blurred Crusade is the second album by the Australian alternative rock band the Church, released in March 1982 by EMI Parlophone. Moving away from the new wave leanings of their debut, it was stylistically more complex and "a smoother, fuller release". "With its mystical lyrics the second album ... brought the group's own style more into focus". The album peaked at No. 10 on the Australian Kent Music Report Albums Chart and "Almost With You" reached No. 21 on the related Singles Chart.

== Background ==
While still dominated primarily by Steve Kilbey's songwriting, The Blurred Crusade shows a stronger influence from 1960s psychedelia and the beginnings of guitarists Peter Koppes' and Marty Willson-Piper's trademark interplay. Lush keyboards, which often imitate strings or vocals, provide an ethereal background, aided by Bob Clearmountain's rich, atmospheric production. The album's opening track and first single, "Almost with You", is considered one of the band's most characteristic songs and the two whole-band compositions, "An Interlude" and "You Took", have been frequently included in set lists throughout their career. Both the band and a large section of the fan-base cite the album as one of their finest.

Following its release, the band undertook their second Australian tour, while Carrere Records released the album in Europe, generating enough sales for them to tour there in October. However, their U.S. label, Capitol Records, declined to release The Blurred Crusade and demanded that they write more radio-friendly material, as exemplified by their stable mates, Little River Band. This horrified the group. After another recording session, five new songs were offered to Capitol, but the label was still unimpressed and dropped the band. The five songs were later released in Australia as the EP Sing-Songs, which reached the Top 100 Albums Chart in December. Meanwhile, their manager, Michael Chugg, arranged a UK tour supporting the hugely successful pop group Duran Duran, but after five gigs the Church pulled out, feeling that the audiences were unsympathetic. Chugg later recalled, "They were hard work. All four of them were strong-willed and had their own ideas of how things should be."

== Reception ==
In October 2010, The Blurred Crusade was listed in the book 100 Best Australian Albums, along with their 1988 album, Starfish, in the Top 40.

Roadrunner called it "a brilliant evocation of neo-psychedelia with Steve Kilbey's haunting love and reincarnation songs superbly captured by Bob Clearmountain. A mature and original work." AllMusic said the album blends "both the various strains of '60s inspiration and postpunk drive detected from the start with an even more elegant melancholy. Musically, both Willson-Piper and Koppes are just fantastic, their combination of guitar playing running the range from sparkling post-Byrds chime to sharp power.

== Track listing ==
1. "Almost with You" (Kilbey) – 4:14
2. "When You Were Mine" (Kilbey) – 5:46
3. "Field of Mars" (Kilbey, Willson-Piper) – 4:54
4. "An Interlude" (Kilbey, Koppes, Ploog, Willson-Piper) – 4:33
5. "Secret Corners" (Kilbey) – 1:49
6. "Just for You" (Kilbey) – 5:20
7. "A Fire Burns" (Kilbey) – 4:51
8. "To Be in Your Eyes" (Kilbey) – 3:50
9. "You Took" (Kilbey, Koppes, Ploog, Willson-Piper) – 8:03
10. "Don't Look Back" (Kilbey) – 2:02

=== Bonus tracks ===
The 2002 EMI Australia and 2010 Second Motion 30th Anniversary Series remasters of the album add two bonus tracks: "Life Speeds Up" (the B-side of "Almost with You") and the instrumental "The Golden Dawn" (the B-side of "When You Were Mine"). The 2002 remaster has the bonus tracks on a second disc, along with The Blurred Crusade promo film, which includes "You Took" and "Almost with You".

== Personnel ==
- Steve Kilbey – lead vocals, bass guitar, keyboards, slide guitar
- Peter Koppes – lead guitar, backing vocals, percussion, tubular bells, piano on "You Took"
- Marty Willson-Piper – electric & acoustic 12 & 6 string guitars, lead vocal on "Field of Mars"
- Richard Ploog – drums, percussion
