= Singsongs =

Sing-Songs

EP by The Church
- Released: 8 December 1982
- Recorded: 1982
- Studio: Studios 301 (Sydney)
- Genres: Alternative rock, neo-psychedelia, psychedelic rock, dream pop
- Label: EMI Parlophone
- Producers: The Church; Bob Clearmountain (co-producer on "I Am a Rock")

The Church chronology
The Blurred Crusade (1982)	Sing-Songs (1982)	Seance (1983)

Singles from Sing-Songs
- 1. "I Am a Rock / A Different Man" Released: 1982

Sing-Songs is the second EP by the Australian psychedelic rock band The Church, released in December 1982.

Unlike its polished predecessors, the material was quickly written and recorded as a demo for the band's U.S. label Capitol Records, who had rejected their previous album, The Blurred Crusade, as too uncommercial. Capitol remained unimpressed and dropped the band, but the recordings were released in Australia by EMI/Parlophone.

Sing-songs was long considered the most difficult item in The Church's catalogue to obtain as it was only released as a fairly limited vinyl pressing.

In 2001, EMI Australia released the compilation album Sing-Songs//Remote Luxury//Persia, which contained remastered versions of all the tracks from the EP in their original running order.

== Track listing ==
1. "A Different Man" (Kilbey)
2. "Ancient History" (Kilbey)
3. "The Night is Very Soft" (Kilbey/R. Kilbey)
4. "In This Room" (Kilbey)
5. "I Am a Rock" (Simon)

== Personnel ==
- Steve Kilbey - bass, lead vocals, keyboards, bells
- Peter Koppes - lead and slide guitars, backing vocals
- Marty Willson-Piper - 12- and 6- string rhythm guitars, backing vocals
- Richard Ploog - drums
