= Remote Luxury (album) =

1984 compilation album by the Church

Compilation album by the Church
- Released: 1984
- Recorded: December 1983, Winter 1984
- Studio: Studios 301 (Sydney)
- Genre: Alternative rock, neo-psychedelia, psychedelic rock, dream pop
- Length: 40:28
- Label: Warner Bros. (US/Canada); Carrere (Europe/Brazil); Arista (US/Canada reissue)
- Producer: The Church and John Bee

The Church chronology
| Seance (1983) | Remote Luxury (1984) | Heyday (1985) |

Professional ratings
Review scores
| Source | Rating |
|---|---|
| AllMusic | 4/5 stars |
| The Rolling Stone Album Guide | 4/5 stars |

Remote Luxury is the first compilation album by the Australian psychedelic rock band the Church, released in 1984. The band had recently signed to Warner Bros. in the United States and their new label decided to re-release the band's most recent Australian material, the Persia and Remote Luxury EPs, as an album with a new running order. They also released "Constant In Opal" as a single in the US. The version of "No Explanation" included here has a 20-second instrumental jam at the beginning.

The album was re-released on CD by Arista Records in 1990, but has since been deleted, and it was re-released in 1988 on LP by carrere records, under the label RGE in Brazil.

In 2001, EMI Australia released the compilation album Sing-Songs//Remote Luxury//Persia, which contained remastered versions of all the tracks from the EPs in their original running order.

== Track listing ==
1. "Constant in Opal" (Kilbey)
2. "Violet Town" (Kilbey)
3. "No Explanation" (Kilbey)
4. "10,000 Miles" (Kilbey/Willson-Piper)
5. "Maybe These Boys..." (Kilbey)
6. "Into My Hands" (Kilbey)
7. "A Month of Sundays" (Kilbey)
8. "Volumes" (Willson-Piper)
9. "Shadow Cabinet" (Kilbey/Koppes/Ploog/Willson-Piper)
10. "Remote Luxury" (Kilbey)

== Personnel ==
- Steve Kilbey - bass, lead vocals (1–3, 5–7, 9), keyboards
- Peter Koppes - guitars, backing vocals
- Marty Willson-Piper - guitars, backing and lead (4, 8) vocals
- Richard Ploog - drums, percussion

Additional keyboards by Craig Hooper and David Moor
