= Davey Ray Moor =

- Born: David Raymond Moore; Beirut, Lebanon
- Origin: Sydney, Australia
- Genres: Rock; indie rock
- Occupations: Musician; composer; producer; teacher
- Instruments: Vocals; keyboards
- Years active: 1983–present

Davey Ray Moor (born David Raymond Moore, Beirut) is an England-based songwriter, singer, multi-instrumentalist, composer and producer.

== Biography ==
Davey Ray Moor was born as David Raymond Moore in Beirut, his father was an accountant for the United Nations. As a child he had asthma and was confined indoors where he taught himself to play the piano by playing along to Elton John and David Bowie. He was raised in Sydney then Canberra. In Canberra he had attended Copland College alongside Russell Kilbey (The Crystal Set) and drummer Charles Ratcliffe.

In 1983 Moor, on keyboards and vocals, with Kilbey, Phil Maher and Ratcliffe formed a psychedelic rock group, the Crystal Set, in Sydney. Moor also supplied keyboards for the psychedelic band, the Church, on two of their extended plays, Remote Luxury (March 1984) and Persia (August). The Crystal Set issued their debut album, From Now On, in May 1987 – which included the track, "Flat Earth", written by Moor. The album went to the top of the Australian Independent Chart, and was well received by the critics.

Moor relocated to the United Kingdom where he began working at The Beatmasters' studio as a media and film composer. He later established a recording studio near Glastonbury where, for the next decade, he composed soundtracks for television, film, advertising and documentaries. In 1998, with partners Robin Brown (later of Cousteau and Zennor Alexander, Moor contributed the soundtrack to the BAFTA-winning 1998 Best Documentary for a Channel 4 "Dispatches" film.

Clients across this period include Pepsi, Budweiser, Bacardi, Nintendo, Nissan, Remington, the BBC, Channel 4, ITV, MTV, VH-1 and Sky. All the while Moor continued to develop his idea for original songs, eventually writing all the songs that were to become the launchpad for Cousteau.

Toward the end of the nineties, Moor recruited Cousteau and the band recorded a collection of his songs. An invitation to play on Later With Jools Holland on the BBC launched the band into the mainstream. In 2000, Chris Blackwell's Palm Pictures released the recordings as a self-titled album. With baritone Liam McKahey singing all but two of the songs (Moor leads the vocals on the others), Cousteau's lounge-set sound was presented with the perfect raft upon which Moor's romantic sound could float. The band received both enthusiastic reviews (Single of the Week, The Times, Album of The Week, The Guardian, 5-stars, Uncut) and sales throughout the United Kingdom and Europe and met with substantial success in the United States.

Capturing the allure of its predecessor, a second album Sirena replicated its critical and substantial commercial success yet Moor departed the band prior to their third American tour. Instead he chose to work as a producer on Italian singer Cristina Donà's album, which achieved critical acclaim and went to No. 4 on the Italian Charts.

In 2004, with the assistance of vocalists Sergio Cocchi, Darion Marshall, Christina Dona and Debbie Sanders, Moor released his first true solo endeavour "Telepathy" on NuN/Edel in Europe. 4 and 5 star reviews across publications such as Rolling Stone Magazine and All Music followed, and Telepathy was included in Musica's Critics Top 100 in 2004 – one of two albums that Moor wrote and produced – the other being Cristina Donà's debut album in English. In 2005 Telepathy was released by Lakeshore Records throughout the US. Critical reaction was again enthusiastic, some describing the album as the best work of his career.

Later Moor teamed up with Libertine Carl Barât co-wrote "Run With the Boys", "Carve My Name", "Shadows Fall", "Death Fires" and "This Is The Song" on Barât's eponymous solo album, which was released in 2010. He co-wrote one song ("Beginning to See") with Barât, and also produced two songs ("We Want More" and "The Gears") on Carl Barât and The Jackals' Let It Reign album. Moor and Barât continued their partnership, composing the soundtrack to the film For This Is My Body (French: C'est mon corps) directed by Paule Muret, which debuted at the Geneva International Film Festival in 2015. It was in this era that the songs "The Innermost Light" and "Love Is Not on Trial" were written, later performed by the reformed CousteauX and Marc Almond.

That same year, Moor and Liam McKahey re-united to record their comeback album CousteauX. In September 2017 the album was released in the UK and the US to resounding acclaim. Mojo magazine gave the album 4 stars, describing it as 'feel-the-quality nourish songs of emotional masochism'. All Music said "CousteauX is not only one of the year's most promising debuts, but a timeless offering that a decade on will sound as vital and provocative as it does now." Music Republic awarded it 5 stars and claimed it was "One of the very best albums in a decade- the album throbs and pulses with passion... It’s faultless." KCRW in LA featured the opening track Memory Is A Weapon in its Today's Top Tune feature, and Huffington Post singled out Seasons of You for a feature. The album launched with sell out shows in Italy, England and Portugal. CousteauX remain an international cult band with a following distributed across 47 countries.

Until February 2022 Davey led the world's first Distance-Learning Songwriting master's degree at Bath Spa University, as well as re-designing their popular Commercial Music BA (Hons) degree. Alumni include Ren (#1 UK Album October 2023), Mike Dawes (acoustic guitar wizard), Ben Jackson-Cooke (songwriter/producer Rag & Bone Man) and blues/Americana icons Ida Mae.
