= Carl Barât =

English musician (born 1978)

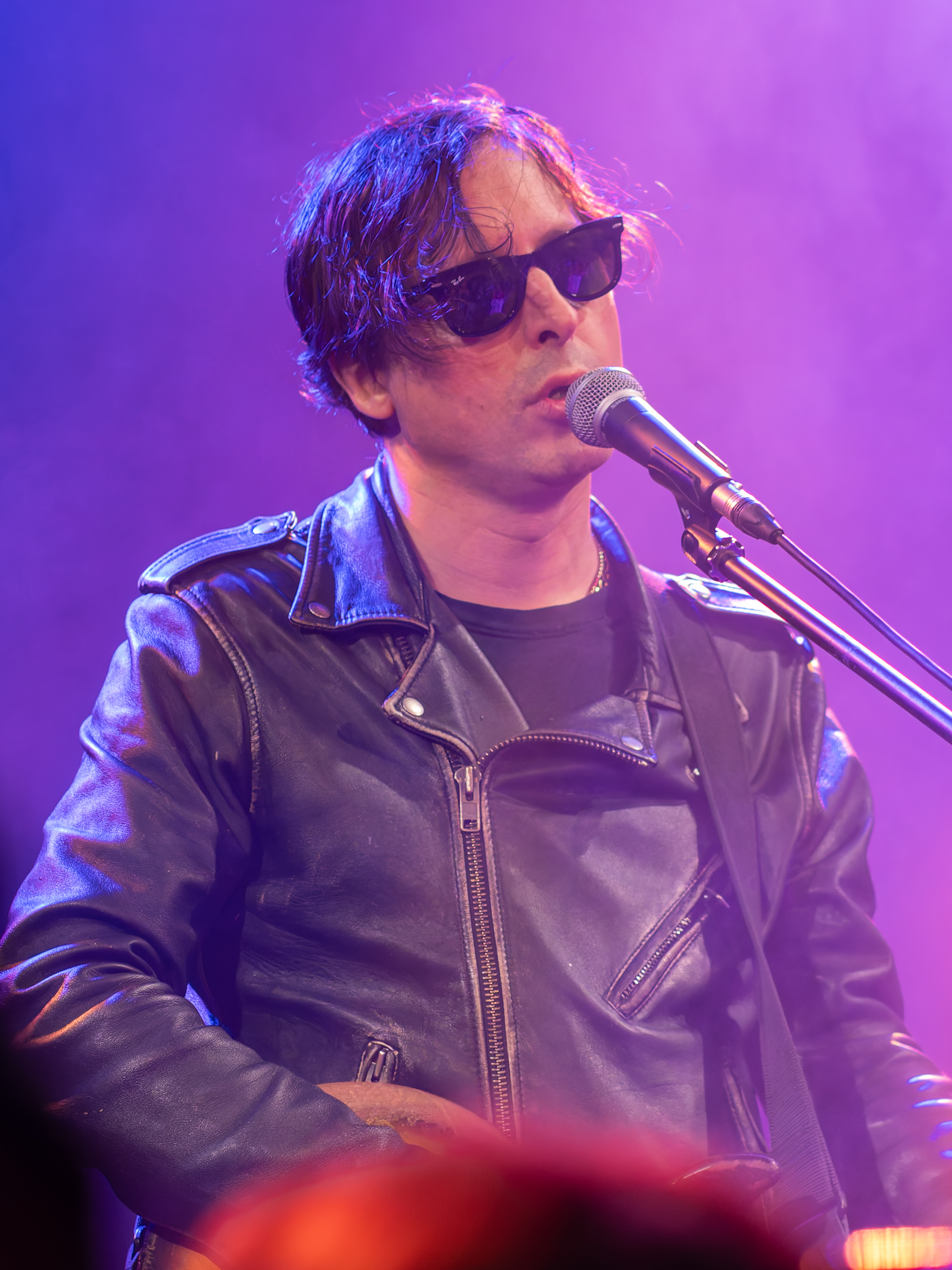
- Barat performing with the Libertines, 2024

Background information
- Born: Carl Ashley Raphael Barât; 6 June 1978 (age 48); Basingstoke, Hampshire, England
- Genres: Indie rock; punk rock
- Instruments: Vocals; guitar; piano; saxophone
- Years active: 1997–present
- Member of: The Libertines
- Formerly of: The Chavs; The Jackals; Dirty Pretty Things
- Spouse: Edie Langley (m. 2026)

Carl Ashley Raphael Barât (/bəˈrɑːt/; born 6 June 1978) is an English musician who is best known for being a co-frontman (along with Pete Doherty) of the indie-rock band the Libertines. He also was the frontman and guitarist of Dirty Pretty Things. In 2010, Barât released a debut solo studio album. Beginning in 2014, he led The Jackals.

== Early life ==
Carl Barât was born in Basingstoke, north Hampshire, England, on 6 June 1978, and spent most of his childhood in nearby Whitchurch, Hampshire. In a September 2004 interview with Blender, Barât mentioned he is of French, Russian and Polish descent.

As a youth, Barât divided his time between his divorced parents. His father, a former artist, worked in an armaments factory, and his mother, Chrissie, was part of the commune-dwelling counterculture and a member of peace groups such as the Campaign for Nuclear Disarmament. Barât spent part of his childhood living with his mother on a commune in Somerset. His sister, the actress and singer Lucie Barât, played Helen of Troy's handmaiden in the 2004 film Troy, founded the publishing house Little Episodes, and is the lead singer of the Au Revoirs. He also has three half-siblings, one step brother and one step sister.

In 1996, Barât was studying for a drama degree at Brunel University at its campus in St. Margarets, Twickenham. There he became well-acquainted with Pete Doherty's sister, Amy-Jo, through whom he met Doherty. Barât and Doherty soon developed an intense friendship based on a shared interest in music, and invented a mythology in which they were on a ship called 'The Albion' that was sailing to 'Arcadia'. They both dropped out of university to form The Libertines, which bassist John Hassall and drummer Gary Powell subsequently joined. Barât and Doherty each contributed songwriting, guitar, and vocals to The Libertines.

== Career ==
=== The Libertines ===
The Libertines' first album, Up the Bracket, was released in 2002 to critical acclaim. The band appeared on the cover of NME before the album was released and rapidly rose to fame in the UK. Referring to their relationship in a January 2010 interview, Barât said, "... it's a deep love. Deep love does funny things to people".

In 2003, Doherty's addiction to heroin and crack cocaine led Barât to ask him not to participate in the band's next tour. When Doherty discovered that the Libertines had left without him to perform in Japan he broke into Barât's Mayfair flat and stole various items, including an antique guitar and an NME Award. He was convicted and sentenced to six months in prison (this sentence was later shortened to two months). Barât warmly welcomed Doherty back to the Libertines on the day of his release, and they later performed an impromptu "Freedom Gig" at the Tap 'n' Tin club in Chatham, Kent on 8 October 2003. A photograph of the gig, taken by Roger Sargent, adorns the Libertines' self-titled second album, The Libertines, and the cover of Sargent's and Anthony Thornton's book, The Libertines Bound Together.

Doherty's drug addiction continued while the band worked on their second album (the aforementioned The Libertines) in 2004, which strained his relationship with Barât. Bodyguards were needed in the recording sessions, allegedly to prevent Barât and Doherty from physically assaulting each other (though this is claimed to be an exaggeration of the press in Bound Together) and to keep Doherty's hangers-on away from him. Before the release of the album in 2004, relations between Barât and Doherty reached a breaking point and Doherty was once again prevented from performing with the band before addressing his addictions. Doherty did not take the ultimatum well, especially as the Libertines continued touring without him to fulfill contractual obligations.

What was intended as a short leave of absence turned into something more permanent, as Doherty formed a new band, Babyshambles, and the Libertines officially disbanded after their final gig in December 2004.

On 15 May 2009, Barât, Doherty and Powell of the Libertines played on stage together for the first time since the split in 2004. The Libertines (minus Denmark-residing bassist John Hassall) came together for a tribute gig for their late promoter, Johnny Sedassy. The six song set, which included "What a Waster", "Up the Bracket" and "Death on the Stairs", was played after Babyshambles appeared on stage. Barât said the show was a 'one off', although he said more shows could not be ruled out. Barât also expressed his desire to get on stage with Doherty again, although perhaps not until 2010. Powell also confirmed that he would be interested in a full reunion, although he wished to "readdress old ghosts first".

The Libertines announced in 2010 that they would be headline artists at the 2010 Reading and Leeds Festivals. Their set, featuring the characteristic chemistry between Barât and Doherty, was one of the highlights of the weekend.

In April 2014, the Libertines announced they would again reform for a show at London's Hyde Park. In November 2014 the band signed a record deal with Virgin EMI Records, and released their third album, Anthems for Doomed Youth, on 11 September 2015, leading to Headline slots at Reading and Leeds, T in the Park as well as a surprise slot at Glastonbury. They toured across 2016 and 2017, finishing with a tour across the seaside.

=== Dirty Pretty Things ===
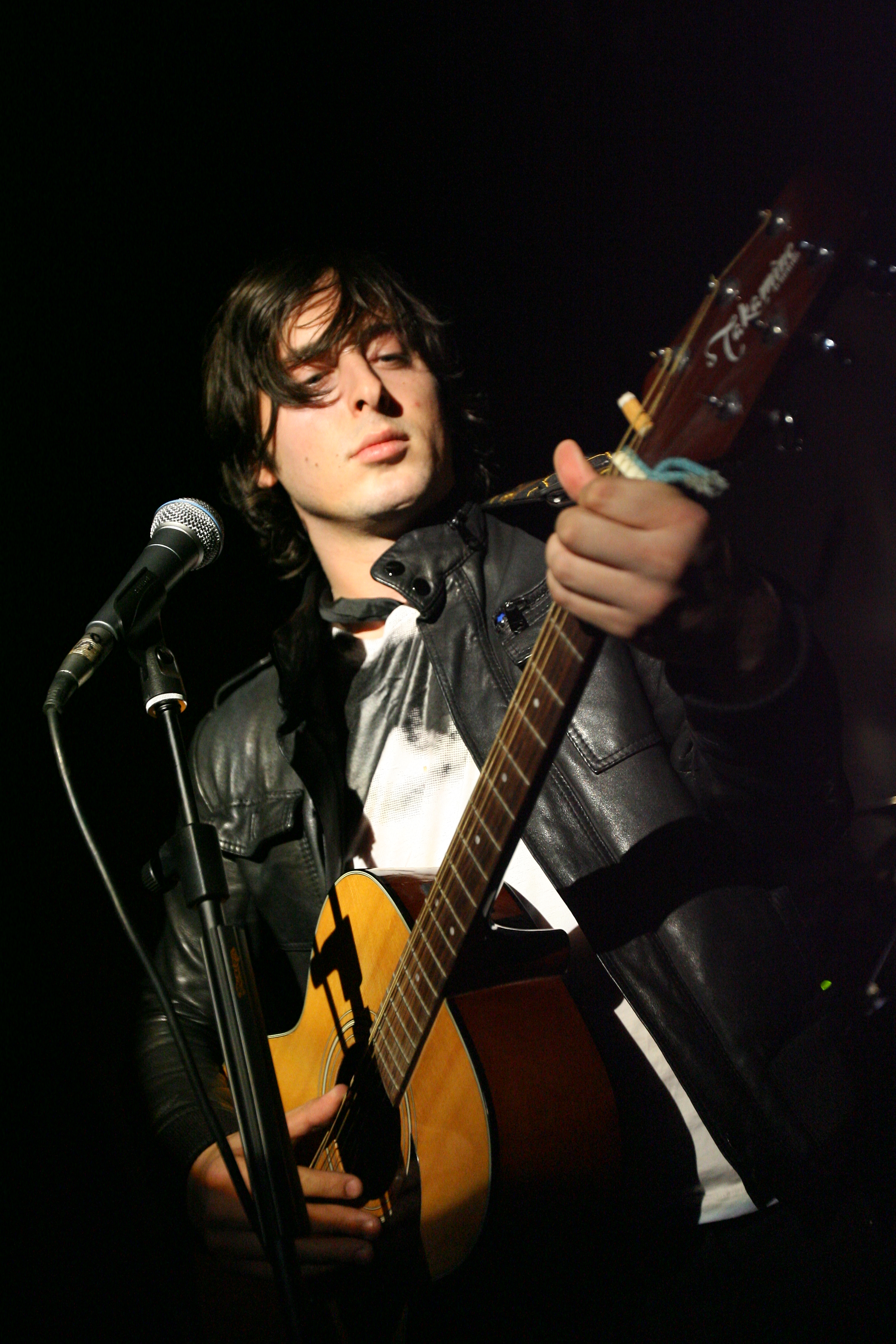
Barât in 2005

On 15 September 2005, it was announced that Barât was forming a band. It was later announced that the band's name was "Dirty Pretty Things".

The group played their first shows in Italy and Paris, France, in October 2005, before recording their debut album in November 2005 in Los Angeles, California. This was produced by Dave Sardy, who has also worked with Supergrass, the Dandy Warhols, Jet, Marilyn Manson, the Rolling Stones, and Oasis. The album – entitled Waterloo to Anywhere – was released on 8 May 2006 in the UK and 8 August 2006 in the US.

Their first studio recorded demo, "Bang Bang You're Dead", was released on their website in the form of a flash video. This song was released as their debut single on 24 April 2006 and reached number 5 in the UK single chart. This coincided with the latter part of their first tour of the United Kingdom, which spanned from 26 February to 24 May 2006. Their debut album, Waterloo to Anywhere, was released on 8 May 2006, and reached number 3 in the UK album chart. They have since released "Deadwood" and "Wondering".

The band were forced to postpone their Real Fits fundraiser gig, which had been set to take place at the London Hackney Round Chapel on 20 June 2008 as Barât was rushed to hospital on 17 June with acute pancreatitis. He was released from hospital on 22 June.

The band released their new single, "Tired of England", on 23 June 2008, and their album, Romance at Short Notice, a week later on 30 June.

Their album failed to chart highly despite heavy touring schedules. Powell wrote in the band's message board that it had been a difficult year. On 1 October 2008, Dirty Pretty Things split up, though they finished their final tour which began in Glasgow on 4 October and ended in London on 20 December.

=== Solo work and contributions ===
In 2005, Barât modelled for clothing brand J. Lindeberg, along with Juliette Lewis.

In 2008, Tim Burgess stated that he and Barât had a supergroup the Chavs and planned to record their debut album in August that year. A release never happened.

Barât toured as a solo artist with Glasvegas, performing with them at Edinburgh's Hogmanay celebrations on 31 December 2008, and at the Popscene in San Francisco on 8 January 2009. On 14 January 2009, Barât supported Glasvegas with a solo show during their gig at the Los Angeles Troubadour .

Barât played his first headline solo shows on 6 and 7 March 2009 at the Wakefield Escobar. He also played at the KU Bar in Stockton-on-Tees on 8 March. On 9 June 2009, Barât debuted two new songs, "So Long" and "Monday Morning" at a solo show at Dunfermline's Carnegie Hall. On 2 September, Barât confirmed his intentions to release a solo album. Barât also produced the debut EP "Scapegoat" of London-based singer-songwriter Kieran Leonard which was released in October 2009.

He released his self-titled, first solo album on 4 October 2010. In an interview with C.B.Liddell of Metropolis magazine he described the album as "the first album I've done that is kind of introspective rather than escapist." In the same interview, he also talked about "stepping away from big loud guitars" as the album is stylistically more diverse and less rock-oriented than previous work. The release of Barât's first solo album also coincided with the release of Threepenny Memoir: The Lives of a Libertine, an autobiography documenting his years in The Libertines and Dirty Pretty Things.

In January 2013 Barât announced that guitarist Johnny Marr (formerly of the Smiths) and drummer Andy Burrows (formerly of Razorlight and We Are Scientists) would feature on his second solo album, due for release in 2013. Barât revealed demo versions of tracks 'War of the Roses' and 'Victory Gin' from his second solo effort online. Also in 2013, Barât wrote the track "The dark, it comes" for French singer Vanessa Paradis' album Love Songs, on which they duet.

He is part of the supergroup The Bottletop Band with Matt Helders (Arctic Monkeys), Andy Nicholson (Arctic Monkeys), Drew McConnell (Babyshambles) and Gruff Rhys (Super Furry Animals). The band's single, "The Fall of Rome", was released in December 2010.

In 2014, Barât contributed the song "Love Is Not on Trial", co-written with Davey Ray Moor, for Marc Almond's album The Dancing Marquis. He also contributed vocals and guitar to the track.

=== Carl Barât and the Jackals ===
In August 2013, Barât announced that his second solo album was complete and he had finished recording it with Joby Ford of the Bronx. He expressed that it was a return to guitar orientated rock stating "It would seem that my relationship with my guitar is all patched up." Later he said that he wouldn't release the new material until he'd formed a new band.

In early 2014, Barât announced that he would search for a new band online via Facebook. From over 1000 applications for the positions of rhythm guitarist, drummer and bass guitar, Billy Tessio, Jay Bone and Adam Claxton were chosen, respectively. The band was named the Jackals, and their first live concert was on 15 May 2014 in London's XOYO. On 16 February 2015, Barât's previously recorded material was released through Cooking Vinyl with small changes, as the debut album of Carl Barât and The Jackals under the title Let It Reign. It has a score of 67 on review aggregator Metacritic, indicating "generally favorable reviews".

=== Acting and TV ===
In 2005, Barât and his friend, Adam Green of the Moldy Peaches appeared in a documentary following the pair on a night out in London.

On 7 July 2006, Barât announced that he would become the fifth mentor in the Road to V competition, which involved a UK search for the best unsigned music talent in the UK, with the winner opening V Festival in either Chelmsford or Staffordshire.

In 2008, he acted in the British film Telstar, in the role of rock 'n' roll singer Gene Vincent. The film premiered at the London Film Festival on 25 October 2008 and was released on 19 June 2009. He also featured in an advertisement for BBC Two's The Culture Show, being asked about British culture. A longer version of his interview can be found on the Culture Show website.

In May 2009 Barât featured as himself in a pilot episode for Svengali, alongside former manager Alan McGee and Welsh actor Jonathan Owen, and went on to appear as himself in the film version of Svengali (2013), directed by John Hardwick. On 25 August 2009, a short video entitled "Two British Dudes" featuring Barât and fellow musician Har Mar Superstar was released on crappyholidays.net.

In January 2010, he appeared in the stage play Fool For Love alongside actress Sadie Frost. The play ran until March 2010 at Riverside Studios in Hammersmith, London. Barât also narrated a new artist documentary, Mark Donne's The Rime of the Modern Mariner. The film had its world premiere at St Anne's Church in Limehouse, East London, during the ninth East End Film Festival. Barât's former Dirty Pretty Things bandmate Anthony Rossomando composed the score for the film.

Barât made his opera debut in 2012, as Nero in Pop'pea at the Théâtre du Châtelet in Paris; the show was a rock adaptation of Il Nerone. In the same year he played the role of Gavin Metcalf in Dan Turner's film The Man Inside, and had a cameo appearance on the BBC Three TV series Dead Boss.

== Personal life ==
In 2005, Barât underwent surgery to remove a tumour behind his ear that, after several weeks of recovery, left him partially deaf.

Barât's partner, Edie Langley, gave birth to their first child, a boy named Eli, on 9 December 2010, and to their second child, a boy named Ramone, on 26 August 2014. Barât and Langley were married March 2026 in Las Vegas, Nevada. They reside in Margate, Kent.

In 2012, Barât was awarded an honorary doctorate by the University of Winchester for his contribution to the arts.

== Discography ==
=== Albums ===
==== Solo ====
- Carl Barât (4 October 2010) UK No. 52

==== Carl Barât and The Jackals ====
- Let It Reign (16 February 2015) UK No. 47

=== Singles ===
==== As featured artist ====
Title	Year	Peak chart positions					Certifications	Album
Title	Year	UK	BEL (FL)	IRE	NZ	SWI	Certifications	Album
"Bridge over Troubled Water" (as part of Artists for Grenfell)	2017	1	26	25	– (Note: "Bridge over Troubled Water" did not enter the NZ Top 40 Singles Chart, but peaked at number four on the NZ Heatseekers Singles Chart.)	28		Non-album single
