= Romance at Short Notice =

Studio album by Dirty Pretty Things
- Released: 30 June 2008
- Genre: Indie rock
- Length: 45:53
- Label: Vertigo / Mercury
- Producer: Dirty Pretty Things; Ben Wood; Graeme Stewart; Nik Leman

Dirty Pretty Things chronology
Waterloo to Anywhere (2006)	Romance at Short Notice (2008)

Professional ratings
Review scores
Source	Rating
AllMusic	3/5 stars
Digital Spy	3/5 stars
Drowned in Sound	5/10 stars
The Guardian	3/5 stars
The Independent	2/5 stars
NME	6/10 stars
Rock Sound	7/10 stars
The Times	2/5 stars
Uncut	3/5 stars

Romance at Short Notice is the second and last album by Dirty Pretty Things, released in the UK on 30 June 2008. The first single, "Tired of England", was released on 23 June 2008. The title of the album is a reference to the final line of the Saki short story "The Open Window".

The second track from the album, "Hippy's Son", was made available free to download on the band's official website for a short time. On 22 June 2008 the band made the entire album available free for streaming at NME.com.

The album entered the UK chart at a 35 and spent 1 week inside the top 40. The poor performance is considered to be one of the causes of the band's split-up.

== Track listing ==
1. "Buzzards & Crows"
2. "Hippy's Son"
3. "Plastic Hearts"
4. "Tired of England"
5. "Come Closer"
6. "Faultlines"
7. "Kicks or Consumption"
8. "Best Face"
9. "Truth Begins"
10. "Chinese Dogs"
11. "The North"
12. "Blood on My Shoes"

== Chart performance ==
Chart (2008)	Peak position
UK Albums Chart	35
