= Didz Hammond =

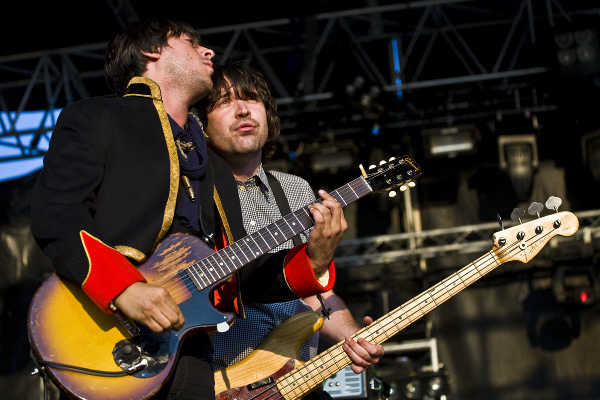
- Hammond (right) and Carl Barât with Dirty Pretty Things in 2007

Background information
- Born: David Jonathan Hammond; 19 July 1981 (age 45); Reading, Berkshire, England
- Genres: Post-punk revival, alternative rock
- Occupation: Musician
- Instrument: Bass
- Years active: 1998–present

David Jonathan Hammond (born 19 July 1981), better known as Didz Hammond, is an English bassist. He was the bassist and backing vocalist in The Cooper Temple Clause (while also occasionally playing other instruments), and in Carl Barât's Dirty Pretty Things. The band's second album, Romance at Short Notice, saw Hammond taking on more vocal duties within the band, for example contributing all the vocals on the ballad "The North". He is also the bass player in Brett Anderson's live electric band. Before music, Didz made his trade as a stand-up comedian in Reading.

In 2002, Hammond was named "34th coolest person in the world" by NME. He usually plays a yellow and black Fender Precision Bass and a red Burns Bison bass, but also has two semi-acoustic Epiphone basses, one in yellow and black sunburst, and a pink banjo, the other in red and black. He is also fond of acoustic basses, of which he has two - one with a natural finish, the other with a black gloss. Both are Epiphones.

Hammond currently live in North London with his wife, Gemma, and son Jack (born 2015). He has an elder son and two daughters by his former partner Anna; Nico (born 2004), Sonny (born 2007) and Sandie Blue, born 19 December 2008. He co-manages the UK band Suede with Ian Grenfell, on behalf of the Quietus Management.
