= Dirty Pretty Things (band) =

British rock band

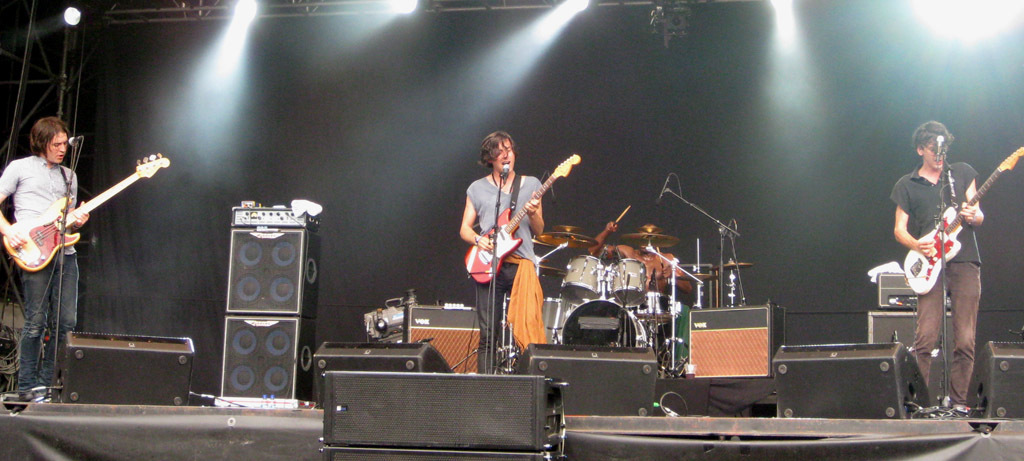
- Dirty Pretty Things performing at the Øya Festival in 2008. From left: Didz Hammond, Carl Barât, Gary Powell (on drums), Anthony Rossomando

Background information
- Origin: London, England
- Genres: Indie rock, garage rock revival
- Years active: 2005–2008, 2022, 2026
- Label: Vertigo
- Past members: Carl Barât; Didz Hammond; Gary Powell; Anthony Rossomando

Dirty Pretty Things were an English rock band fronted by Carl Barât, a member of The Libertines. The formation of the band was announced in September 2005, after a dispute between Barât and Pete Doherty led to the breakup of The Libertines in 2004. Barât had worked with Vertigo Records and had previously revealed that his new project was with the label. Didz Hammond announced he was leaving the Cooper Temple Clause to join the band alongside Libertines drummer Gary Powell and guitarist Anthony Rossomando, who had filled in for Doherty following his departure from The Libertines. They played their first shows in October 2005 in Rome, Italy and Paris, France. They announced their split on 1 October 2008 and played their final shows during November that year.

After adopting the name Dirty Pretty Things, problems arose - a four-piece band from Salisbury had been playing as "Dirty Pretty Things" since early January 2005, claiming to have already trademarked the name in the UK. The two groups came to an agreement over the name, and the other band was renamed Mitchell Devastation. An Australian band had been playing under "Dirty Pretty Things" since 2003, although they also opted to change it. The name was shared by Barât's club nights in venues throughout London; they assumed the name "Bright Young Things" to avoid confusion.

== History ==
=== Formation and Waterloo to Anywhere: 2005–2006 ===
Dirty Pretty Things began recording their first album in Los Angeles, California with high-profile producer Dave Sardy, and in Glasgow, Scotland with producer Tony Doogan. "You Fucking Love It", a track from the band's debut album, was made available on a free CD with 1 April 2006 issue of NME entitled "NME and MTV2 present Best Newbands Showcase 2006".

The band's debut album, Waterloo to Anywhere, was released on 8 May 2006, reaching number three on the music charts and receiving critical approval. The first single (and first official band release) from the album, "Bang Bang, You're Dead", was released on 24 April 2006 and reached number five in the singles chart in its first week of sales. The second single, "Deadwood", was released on 10 July 2006 and reached number 20 in the singles chart. The album's third single, "Wondering", was released on 25 September 2006 and reached number 34.

The band toured extensively in the UK during the first half of 2006. They played their first American show at the SXSW festival in Texas. During the summer of 2006, the group played at several UK festivals, including the Gonville & Caius College May Ball 2006, Isle of Wight Festival, Wireless Festival, T in the Park, Kendal Calling and the Irish festival Oxegen. The band played with the Red Hot Chili Peppers at their concerts in Ipswich and Coventry in July 2006. The band were supported on their debut tour of the UK by Dublin band Humanzi.

On 13 May 2006 Barât and Hammond appeared on the football show Soccer AM. The pair appeared to be high or drunk following a night out after a gig in Wolverhampton, causing fellow guest Noel Gallagher to compare Barât's slightly incoherent rambling to that of his brother, Liam.

Following a festival appearance in Taipei, Barât broke his collarbone after falling from a motorbike during a drinking session, leading to speculation that Dirty Pretty Things would have to cancel upcoming performing dates in North America.

On 16 October 2006, the band released a DVD, Puffing on a Coffin Nail, which featured more than two-and-a-half hours of concert footage and documentaries. On 25 October 2006, Barât appeared as a special guest at Paul Weller's set during the Electric Proms, duetting on "Peacock Suit" and "In the City".

=== Romance at Short Notice: 2007–2008 ===
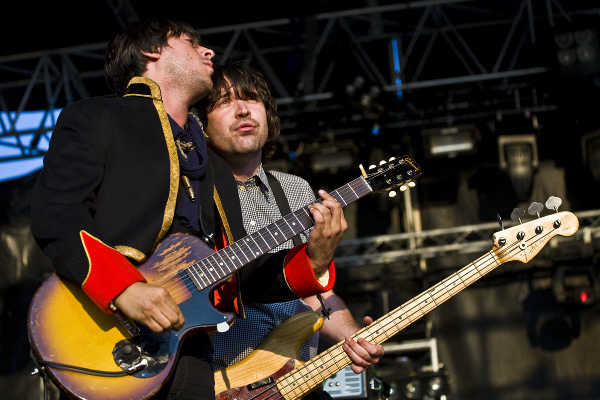
Dirty Pretty Things performing in 2007

The band supported Muse at their 16 June 2007 Wembley Stadium show and supported the Red Hot Chili Peppers on 24 June at Goffertpark Nijmegen in The Netherlands. They also played at Glastonbury 2007 and performed several new songs. On 22 July the band supported Pet Shop Boys at the Eden Project in Cornwall, playing a slew of new songs including "Come Closer". "Radio Song" (co-written by Barât and Chris McCormack) was released as part of the original soundtrack for Run, Fat Boy, Run, on 7 September 2007 for download, and on 10 September 2007 on CD. In October the band appeared on the Love Music Hate Racism CD, which was given away with copies of the NME and also available as a download from the LMHR website . "9 Lives" was Dirty Pretty Things' contribution to the free album and was in a finished studio form (although it was recorded in guitarist Anthony Rossomando's flat in London).

The band planned to record their second album in the summer of 2007, to have it ready for a tentative September 2007 release. However, the band were having problems with production and the release date had to be pushed back. On 2 May 2008 the band had completed 12 tracks for the album and later revealed the title to be Romance at Short Notice. The name is a reference to the final line in Saki's short story "The Open Window." Previously, the title This Is Where The Truth Begins had been circulated as the title of the album.

On 12 May 2008, the song "Hippy's Son" was made available for free download from the band's official website and on 22 June the band made all of the album available for free streaming on NME.com. Romance at Short Notice was released on 30 June 2008, with the single "Tired of England" released a week earlier on 23 June. Both, album and single, failed to reach high chart positions. The album entered the UK albums chart at number 35 and left it after only two weeks. On 7 July the band placed 4 songs available for download on Napster - "Buzzards and Crows", "Plastic Hearts", "Hippy's Son" and a cover of Bob Dylan's "Subterranean Homesick Blues". On 11 July the band appeared on XFM's Live From Leicester Square programme. They played "Plastic Hearts", "Bang Bang You're Dead" and a cover of Glasvegas' "It's My Own Cheating Heart That Makes Me Cry".

In May 2008, Dirty Pretty Things had their Coventry Kasbah gig filmed and later broadcast on Channelbee.

=== Separation ===
On 1 October 2008 it was announced that the band would split after a month-long UK tour, beginning in Preston on 3 October. In a statement, the band said it was time for them "to try new things" but added that these would not involve The Libertines.

The last Dirty Pretty Things gig, 'The Last Hurrah' was announced for 20 December 2008, at the Astoria 2 in London. Support was from The Paddingtons. The band promised 'a night to remember' and signed memorabilia to thank the loyal fans of the band.

== Discography ==
=== Studio albums ===
- Waterloo to Anywhere (2006)
- Romance at Short Notice (2008)
