= Gary Powell (musician) =

British drummer (born 1969)

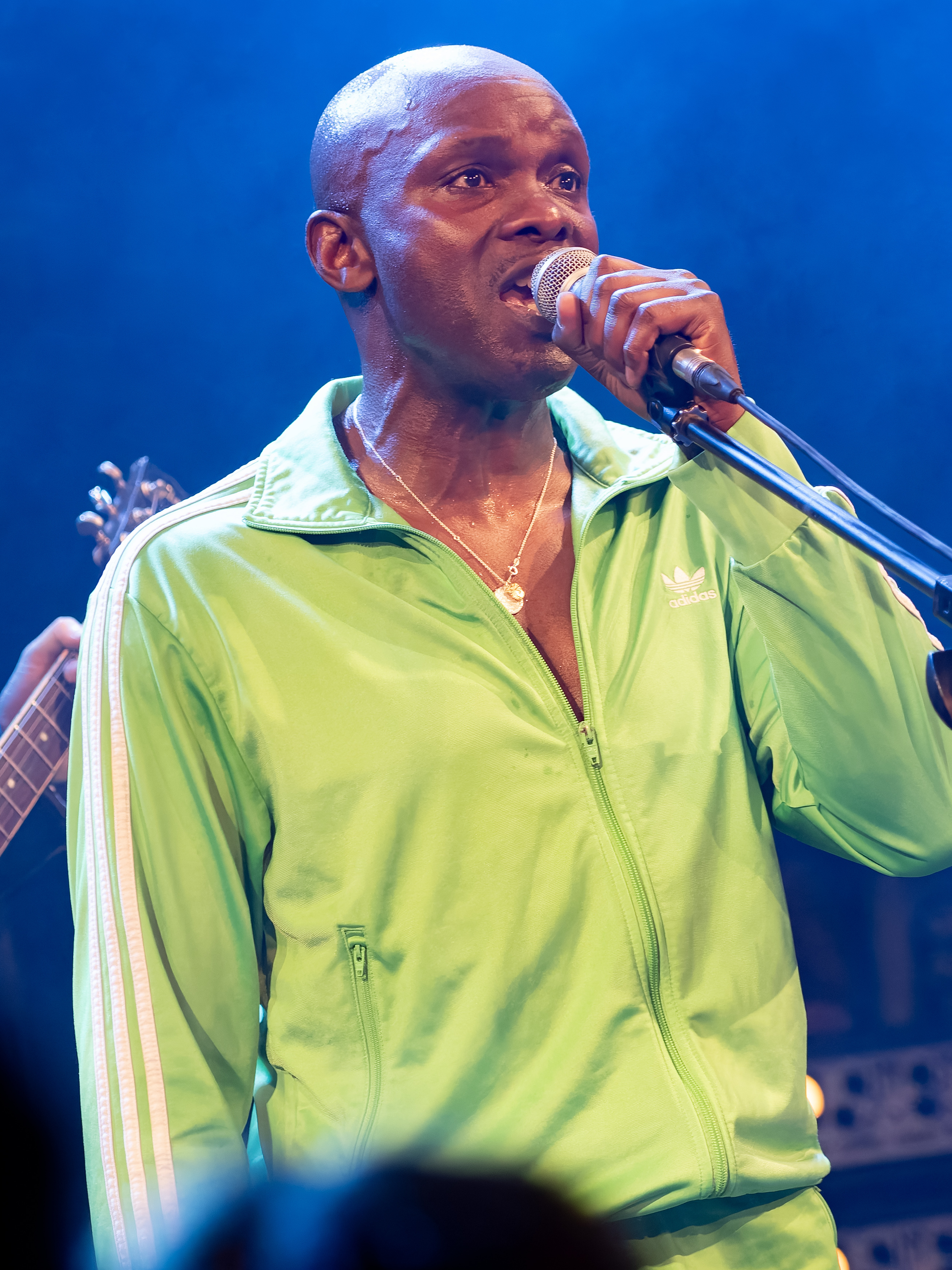
- Powell in 2024

Background information
- Born: Gary Armstrong Powell; 11 November 1969 (age 56); Los Angeles, California, U.S.
- Origin: Birmingham, England
- Genres: Rock
- Occupation: Drummer
- Years active: 2001–present
- Member of: The Libertines; Dirty Pretty Things
- Formerly of: New York Dolls; The Specials

Gary Armstrong Powell (born 11 November 1969) is a British musician. He is best known as the drummer for rock bands The Libertines, Dirty Pretty Things and New York Dolls as well as for ska band The Specials.

== Career ==
Powell joined The Libertines in 2001 after being introduced to frontmen Carl Barât and Pete Doherty by their then-manager Banny Poostchi. He also played with the New York Dolls for their 2004 reunion shows. From 2016 to 2019, he was the touring drummer for ska band The Specials, replacing the late John Bradbury. Powell is also known for being the drummer for American hip-hop soul artists Mary J. Blige and Lauryn Hill, as well as Guyanese-British reggae musician Eddy Grant.

Powell also has a successful DJ career, deejaying for Club NME at London's Koko and Carl Barât's club night as well as many other venues in London. He runs his own record label, 25 Hour Convenience Store.

== Personal life ==
Powell has two sons, Wolfe and Asa, with long-term partner Jude.
