= Anthony Rossomando =

American guitarist (born 1976)

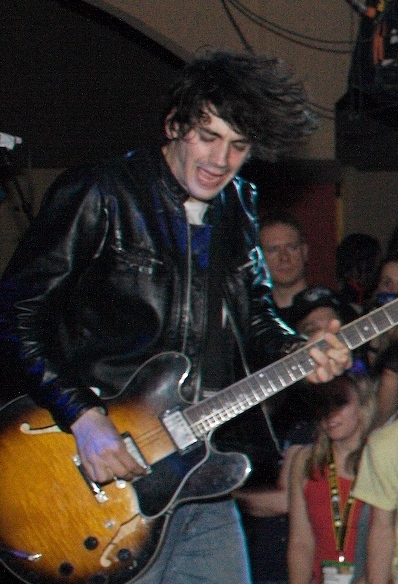
- Rossomando in 2006

Background information
- Born: February 21, 1976 (age 50); United States
- Genres: Punk rock Post-punk
- Instrument: Guitar
- Years active: 2001–present

Anthony Rossomando (born February 21, 1976) is an American musician. Rossomando, along with Carl Barât, was a founding member of Dirty Pretty Things. He previously stood in for Pete Doherty in The Libertines as a touring member. He has also been a live member of British New Rave band Klaxons. Rossomando has won Oscar, Grammy, and Golden Globe awards.

== Life and career ==
Rossomando grew up in Hamden, Connecticut.

After dropping out of university in his first year he relocated to Boston where The Damn Personals was founded. The band played often at numerous Boston, Providence, and New York indie venues. They also toured Europe and UK once with Cave In.

In 2003, introduced by Isaac Green of Columbia records, Rossomando met Carl Barât in New York City and agreed to fill in for Doherty in an upcoming US tour for The Libertines; this was followed by a trip to London to play Top of the Pops and Reading and Leeds festival. Eight months later he rejoined The Libertines to help support the entire worldwide touring campaign for their self-titled second album. It was during this time when Rossomando and Barât began to formulate their ideas that would later embody Dirty Pretty Things.

In May 2006, Dirty Pretty Things released Waterloo To Anywhere which reached no. 3 in the UK charts, while the first single "Bang Bang You're Dead" peaked at no. 4. The band toured extensively in the UK, US, Europe and Japan.

Rossomando also played trumpet on the song "Set You Free" by Chisel, Piebald's "We Are the Only Friends We Have", and "The New Fellas" by The Cribs.

The Rime of the Modern Mariner, Anthony's first film score, premiered at the East London Film Festival in May 2011 with live orchestral arrangement which also went to several festivals including Latitude, SXSW, and Toronto. The film and score received high praise from many publications including the Times and the Guardian.

In November 2007, he played the role of Pete Neon in the first episode of the third series of The Mighty Boosh.

In 2018, Rossomando co-wrote the song "Shallow" with Lady Gaga, Mark Ronson, and Andrew Wyatt. It was produced by Gaga with Benjamin Rice. "Shallow" is a song from the 2018 film A Star Is Born, performed by Lady Gaga and Bradley Cooper. It was the first single from the film's soundtrack and was released on September 27, 2018, by Interscope Records. "Shallow" was nominated for and won Best Original Song – Feature Film at the 2018 Hollywood Music in Media Awards. It also received a nomination in the category of Best Original Song at the 23rd Satellite Awards, and from the Los Angeles Online Film Critics Society. It won the award for Best Original Song at the 76th Golden Globe Awards and the Academy Award for Best Original Song at the 91st Academy Awards in 2019.

Rossomando also penned the X Ambassadors song Great Unknown for Disney's version of Jack London's book The Call of the Wild which starred Harrison Ford.

== Discography ==
=== Soundtrack appearances ===
- The Rime of the Modern Mariner (2010)

=== As producer ===
- Accidental Happiness - EP (2014) – Ida Maria
- Big Things (2010) – Fiction
- Parakeets (2010) – Fiction
