= Idlewild discography =

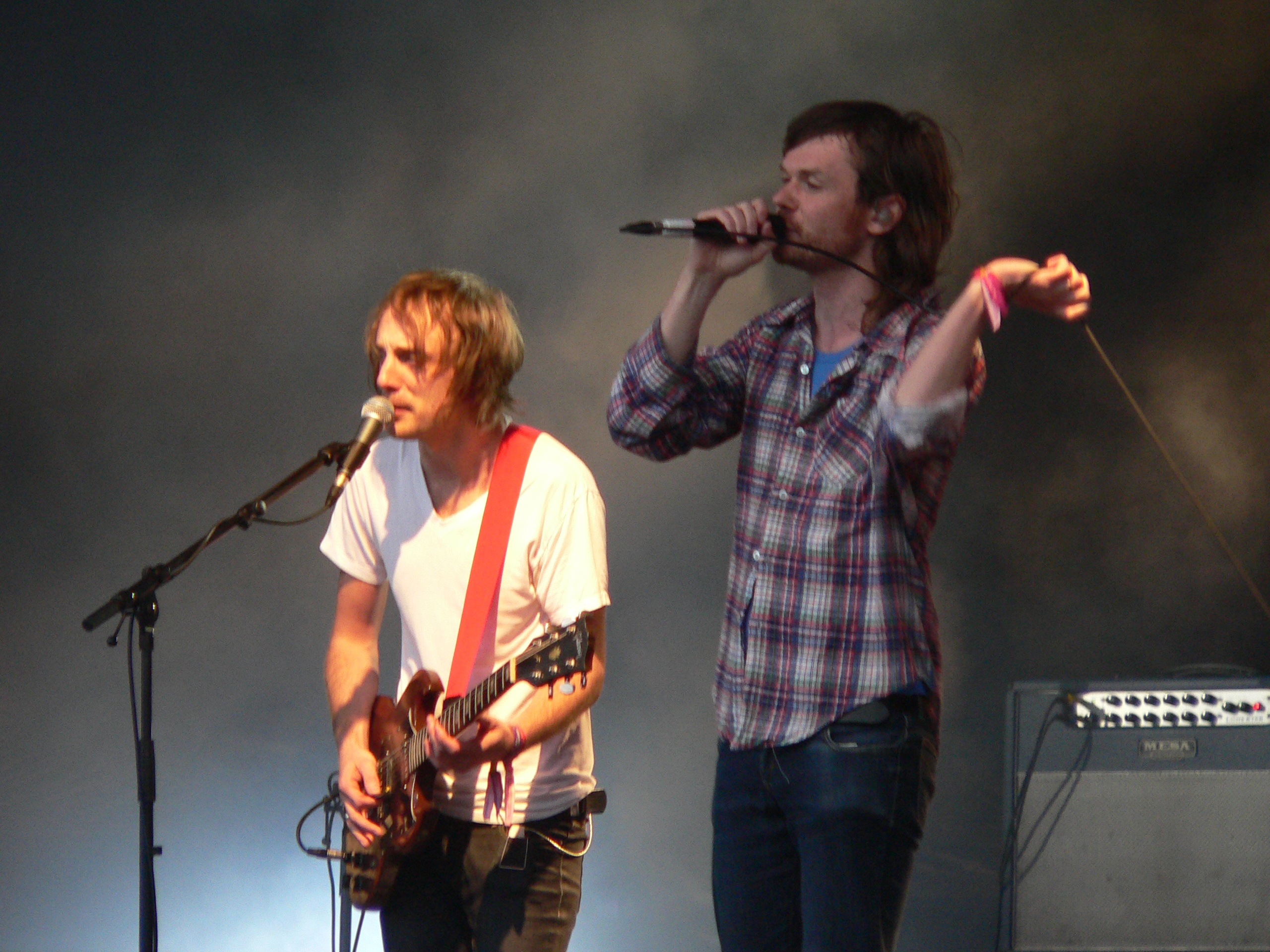
- Idlewild at The Outsider in 2008
- Studio albums: 10
- EPs: 3
- Live albums: 2
- Compilation albums: 3
- Singles: 26

The discography of Idlewild, a Scottish rock band, consists of ten studio albums, three EPs, three compilations, one live album, and twenty-eight singles.

== Studio albums ==
Year	Details	Peak chart positions				Certifications (sales thresholds)
Year	Details	UK	FRA	IRE	SCO	Certifications (sales thresholds)
1998	Captain^{1}: Released: January 1998; Label: Deceptive Records	—^{2}	—	—	—	
1998	Hope Is Important: Released: 19 October 1998; Label: Food Records	53	—	—	44	BPI: Silver
2000	100 Broken Windows: Released: 9 May 2000; Label: Food Records	15	—	—	6	BPI: Gold
2002	The Remote Part: Released: 15 July 2002; Label: Parlophone	3	135	39	2	BPI: Gold
2005	Warnings/Promises: Released: 7 March 2005; Label: Parlophone	9	—	50	5	BPI: Silver
2007	Make Another World: Released: 5 March 2007; Label: Sequel Records	24	—	100	8	
2009	Post Electric Blues^{3}: Released: 5 October 2009; Label: Cooking Vinyl	90	—	—	37	
2015	Everything Ever Written^{4}: Released: 9 February 2015; Label: Empty Words	20	—	—	4	
2019	Interview Music: Released: 5 April 2019; Label: Empty Words	22	—	—	1	
2025	Idlewild: Released: 3 October 2025; Label: V2	16	—	—	3	

- ^{1} Often considered to be a mini-album.
- ^{2} Charted at number 2 on the UK Indie Chart.
- ^{3} Initially self-released to fans on 11 June through idlewildmusic.com.
- ^{4} Pre-orders through Pledge Music announced on 3 November 2014.

== EPs ==
Year	Details
2005	Love Steals Us From Loneliness: Released: 22 February 2005; Label: Parlophone
2005	I Understand It: Released: 29 April 2005; Label: Parlophone
2020	Interview Music – Acoustic EP: Released: 15 January 2020; Label: Empty Words

== Compilation albums ==
Year	Details	Peak chart positions	
Year	Details	UK	SCO
2007	Scottish Fiction - Best of 1997-2007: Released: 1 October 2007; Label: Parlophone/EMI	79	21
2007	A Distant History - Rarities 1997-2007^{1}: Released: 29 October 2007; Label: Parlophone/EMI	—	—
2010	The Collection: Released: 23 April 2010; Label: EMI	—	—

- ^{1} Download-only.

== Live albums ==
Year	Details
2015	Live at Duart Castle: Released: 16 Feb 2015; Given away free to people who pre-ordered Everything Ever Written
2016	Live: Released: 16 May 2016; Label: Empty Words

== Singles ==
Year	Title	Peak chart positions			Album
Year	Title	UK	IRE	SCO	Album
1997	"Queen of the Troubled Teens"^{[A]}	—	—	—	—
1997	"Chandelier"^{[A]}	—	—	—	—
1998	"Satan Polaroid"	160	—	—	Captain
1998	A Film for the Future"	53	—	39	Hope Is Important
1998	"Everyone Says You're So Fragile"	47	—	42	Hope Is Important
1998	"I'm a Message"	41	—	31	Hope Is Important
1999	"When I Argue I See Shapes"	19	—	15	Hope Is Important
1999	"Little Discourage"	24	—	12	100 Broken Windows
2000	"Actually It's Darkness"	23	—	14	100 Broken Windows
2000	"These Wooden Ideas"	32	—	18	100 Broken Windows
2000	"Roseability"	38	—	25	100 Broken Windows
2002	"You Held the World in Your Arms"	9	—	4	The Remote Part
2002	"American English"	15	—	8	The Remote Part
2002	"Live in a Hiding Place"	26	—	17	The Remote Part
2003	"A Modern Way of Letting Go"	28	—	21	The Remote Part
2005	"Love Steals Us from Loneliness"	16	37	6	Warnings/Promises
2005	"I Understand It"	32	—	—	Warnings/Promises
2005	"El Capitan"	39	—	—	Warnings/Promises
2006	"If It Takes You Home"	—	—	—	Make Another World
2007	"No Emotion"	36	—	7	Make Another World
2007	"A Ghost in the Arcade"	—	—	—	Make Another World
2009	"Readers & Writers"	—	—	—	Post Electric Blues
2009	"City Hall"	—	—	—	Post Electric Blues
2014	"Collect Yourself"	—	—	—	Everything Ever Written
2015	"Come on Ghost"	—	—	—	Everything Ever Written
2019	"Dream Variations"	—	—	—	Interview Music
2019	"Same Things Twice"	—	—	—	Interview Music
2019	"There's a Place for Everything" (acoustic)	—	—	—	Interview Music

Notes

- A ^Chart ineligible.

== Other appearances ==
- 1998 – Gran Turismo – "A Film for the Future"
- 2003 – FIFA 2003 – "You Held the World in Your Arms"
- 2005 – Midnight Club 3: DUB Edition – "A Modern Way of Letting Go"
- 2006 – Saints Row – "Too Long Awake"
- 2007 – Ballads of the Book – "The Weight of Years"
