= Idlewild (Idlewild album) =

Studio album by Idlewild
- Released: 3 October 2025
- Recorded: January–March 2025
- Studio: Post Electric (Edinburgh)
- Length: 37:17
- Label: V2
- Producer: Rod Jones; Idlewild

Idlewild chronology
Interview Music (2019)	Idlewild (2025)

Idlewild is the tenth studio album by Scottish rock band Idlewild, released on 3 October 2025 on V2 Records. Produced by guitarist Rod Jones and the band itself, the album was preceded by the singles, "Stay Out of Place", "It's Not the First Time" and "Like I Had Before", and was recorded in Edinburgh at Jones's studio, Post Electric, between January and March 2025.

Released to critical acclaim, the album became the band's highest charting album in over twenty years, reaching number sixteen on the UK Albums Chart, number three on the Scottish Albums Chart, number three on the UK Independent Albums Chart and number four on the UK Vinyl Albums Chart.

== Writing and composition ==
The album was written across 2024 in two separate locations: guitarist Rod Jones's Edinburgh-based studio, Post Electric, and the Isle of Iona where vocalist Roddy Woomble lives, with the band writing together at the island's library. The band made a conscious decision to make each song on the ten-track album as strong as one other, with Woomble noting: "I was always very inspired by The Smiths’ idea that there were no such things as album tracks – only singles, even the b-sides could be singles. That’s the philosophy Idlewild adopted for 100 Broken Windows and The Remote Part and now also with Idlewild."

== Artwork ==
The album's artwork features photographs taken by lead vocalist Roddy Woomble, whose work had previously appeared on the band's album cover for Hope Is Important (1998) and its associated singles.

Woomble made a conscious decision for the album's artwork to reflect the band's earlier work, stating: "I took my camera out to the same places in Scotland I’ve used for Idlewild covers before and took photographs. The album cover shot was taken at the exact same location as the cover photo for Hope Is Important only pointing in a different direction, twenty-eight years later. That cover was of two teenagers (my friends) looking at a washed up, decayed boat – the idea of the future looking at the past. The new cover is another teenager (my son) looking into a different horizon – it’s more colourful and hopeful, and there is a tree in front, which is always good. But taken from the same spot, which for me is quite poignant."

== Reception ==
Professional ratings
Aggregate scores
Source	Rating
Metacritic	75/100
Review scores
Source	Rating
Clash	8/10
Classic Rock	3.5/5 stars
God Is in the TV	8/10
The Line of Best Fit	9/10
Louder Than War	3.5/5 stars
musicOMH	3.5/5 stars
Record Collector	4/5 stars
The Skinny	4/5 stars
Uncut	7/10
Under the Radar	8/10

Rating the album nine, Craig Howieson of the Line of Best Fit remarked, "These ten tracks are an arrestingly assured summary of who they are now, while fully embracing their former selves."

In a four-star review for the Skinny, Billie Estrine observed, "It's a treat when a band that's spent the better part of three decades crafting their sound and poetic sensibilities has all those endless hours of commitment come out crystal clear on their tenth record." Robin Murray of Clash gave the album a rating of eight, describing it "undoubtedly the strongest album of their second arc" and "a release that in any just world would gain plaudits and laurels at every turn." musicOMH's Steven Johnson assigned the album a 3.5-star rating, referring to it as "an album where time invested is rewarded" and "a cohesive collection where all constituent parts interlock in satisfying style." Sam Lambeth of Louder Than War noted the album as "a fresh and purposeful reminder of Idlewild's unique blend of joyous, uplifting melodies and clever, caustic musicianship," rating it 3.5 stars.

== Track listing ==
All tracks are written by Idlewild.

Idlewild track listing
No.	Title	Length
1.	"Stay Out of Place"	3:05
2.	"Like I Had Before"	3:41
3.	"It's Not the First Time"	3:54
4.	"(I Can't Help) Back Then You Found Me"	4:27
5.	"The Mirror Still"	3:37
6.	"Make It Happen"	3:19
7.	"I Wish I Wrote It Down"	3:02
8.	"Permanent Colours"	2:49
9.	"Writers of the Present Time"	3:28
10.	"End with Sunrise"	3:55
Total length:		37:17

== Personnel ==
Credits adapted from the album's liner notes.

=== Idlewild ===
- Rod Jones – guitar, vocals, production, engineering, mixing
- Colin Newton – drums, percussion, production
- Andrew Mitchell – bass, acoustic guitar, percussion, vocals, production
- Luciano Rossi –keyboards, synthesizers, vocals, production
- Roddy Woomble – lead vocals, production, photography

=== Additional contributors ===
- Ed Woods – mastering
- Alexander Brown – design, layout

== Charts ==
Chart performance for Idlewild
Chart (2025)	Peak position
Scottish Albums (OCC)	3
UK Albums (OCC)	16
UK Independent Albums (OCC)	3
