= Live at Kings Place =

Live album by Roddy Woomble
- Released: August 2014
- Recorded: Kings Place, London, 7 May 2014
- Genre: Folk
- Label: Society of Sound, Bowers & Wikins

Live at Kings Place is a live download only album by folk musician and Idlewild vocalist Roddy Woomble, released in August 2014 as the 75th offering from the Society of Sound, a music subscription service provided by Bowers & Wilkins.

== Track listing ==
No.	Title	Length
1.	"A New Day Has Begun"	5:27
2.	"Every Line of a Long Moment"	4:16
3.	"Work Like You Can"	4:54
4.	"Between the Old Moon"	4:43
5.	"The Last One of My Kind"	4:31
6.	"Green Rocky Road"	2:44
7.	"Leaving Without Gold"	4:09
8.	"My Secret Is My Silence"	5:01
9.	"The Universe Is On My Side"	4:58
10.	"Fiddle Tunes"	5:25
11.	"Trouble Your Door"	3:51
12.	"Quiet Crown"	4:15
13.	"You Held the World in Your Arms"	3:43
14.	"Goodnight"	3:25
15.	"Speed of the Sound of Loneliness"	4:05
16.	"I Came in from the Mountain"	3:58
17.	"Waverly Steps"	4:20
18.	"Old Town"	6:53
19.	"Roll Along"	4:29

== Personnel ==
=== Musicians ===
- Roddy Woomble - lead vocals
- Hannah Fisher - fiddle & vocals
- Sorren Maclean - acoustic guitar & vocals
- Luciano Rossi - piano
- Craig Ainslie - electric bass
