= Warnings/Promises =

Studio album by Idlewild
- Released: 7 March 2005
- Recorded: December 2003, May – October 2004
- Studio: Tambourine, Malmö; Sunset Sound Recorders, Los Angeles
- Genre: College rock, folk rock
- Length: 47:07
- Label: Parlophone
- Producer: Tony Hoffer, Dave Eringa

Idlewild chronology
The Remote Part (2002)	Warnings/Promises (2005)	Make Another World (2007)

Singles from Warnings/Promises
- 1. "Love Steals Us from Loneliness" Released: 21 February 2005; 2. "I Understand It" Released: 2 May 2005; 3. "El Capitan" Released: 11 July 2005

Warnings/Promises is the fourth studio album by Scottish rock band Idlewild, released on 7 March 2005 by Parlophone. Following the release of their third studio album The Remote Part (2002), Gavin Fox replaced bassist Bob Fairfoull, and touring guitarist Allan Stewart became a permanent member. They spent the majority of 2003 writing material, before traveling to Malmö, Sweden to record at Tambourine Studios with producer Dave Eringa. After finishing five tracks, they went to Los Angeles to work at Sunset Sound Recorders with producer Tony Hoffer. Due to the laidback nature of the sessions, the band had to re-record everything; recording concluded in October 2004. Described as a college rock and folk rock album, Warnings/Promises emphasized more acoustic instrumentation than its predecessor.

Warnings/Promises received generally favourable reviews from critics, some seeing it as a progression from The Remote Part, while others felt it was weaker than that album. The album charted at number five in Scotland, and number nine in the United Kingdom; it would later be certified silver in the latter territory. All three of its singles charted within the top 40 of the UK Singles Chart, with "Love Steals Us from Loneliness" reaching the highest at number 16. Bookended by two tours of the UK, "Love Steals Us from Loneliness" was released as the lead single from Warnings/Promises on 21 February 2005. The album's second single "I Understand It" was released on 2 May 2002. While appearing at various festivals, the band supported U2 and R.E.M. at several shows. In the midst of this, "El Capitan" was released as the third and final single from the album on 11 July 2005.

== Background and writing ==
Idlewild released their third studio album The Remote Part in July 2002. It peaked at number two in the UK, while all of its four singles appeared within the top 30 of the UK Singles Chart, with "You Held the World in Your Arms" reaching the highest at number nine. They toured the United Kingdom five times (one tour supporting Coldplay), mainland Europe twice (one of which supporting Coldplay again), Australia, and the United States twice (one of which supporting Pearl Jam). Despite the album receiving favourable press in the US, the band's American label Capitol Records declined to promote it in that territory. While this was occurring, the post-punk revival became mainstream, with fellow Scottish band Franz Ferdinand overtaking Idlewild's popularity. Bassist Bob Fairfoull left the band in October 2002, and was temporarily replaced by bass technician Alex Grant. The following month, Gavin Fox of Turn became the band's full-time bassist, and Allan Stewart, who had been part of the band's crew, became their second guitarist.

By December 2002, the band were in the process of writing material for their next album. It became their longest writing process up to this point due to including every member in it. The constant touring started becoming a strain on the members' health as they would have little time to rest in between tours. Idlewild spent the second half of 2003 writing material in the Scottish Highlands. They rented a house and set up all of their equipment there. It marked the first time that every member of the band contributed to the writing process, as previous releases were done for the most part between vocalist Roddy Woomble and guitarist Rod Jones. In retrospect, Jones felt they had "maybe too many song ideas" with "quite a lot of compromising going on". He added that they "weren't skilled enough with our communication skills at that point" to let Fox and Stewart offer more to the writing.

== Production ==
Idlewild recorded with producer Dave Eringa and engineer Guy Massey at Tambourine Studios in Malmö, Sweden, where they had done five tracks. As their line-up had changed, and their songwriting had shifted, the band opted to record in a different location. Alongside this, they wanted a different producer than one they worked with on previous releases, when Tony Hoffer's name was suggested. They liked his work on Beck's albums; Hoffer proposed recording in California. Due to the favourable exchange rate, the band figured out that it would have cost the same to record there as it would have been in the UK. They travelled to Los Angeles, California to work with Hoffer and engineer Todd Burke in May 2004. The band spent some time at a rehearsal space in the city where they showed Hoffer the songs they had and deconstructed them. They rented a house in West Hollywood, California, and recorded at Sunset Sound Recorders. They spent their downtime traversing Big Sur and the Topanga Canyon. Hoffer drafted in additional musicians, such as Inara George and Greg Leisz, to enhance the recordings; George sung additional vocals on "Love Steals Us from Loneliness", "I Want a Warning", "Too Long Awake", and "Goodnight", while Leisz played pedal steel guitar on "Goodnight" and "Disconnected".

Idlewild played two one-off shows in July 2004 at a café in the city where they debuted songs from the forthcoming album. According to drummer Colin Newton, the band had been working at a leisurely pace over the course of three months, and "a lot of the time we were too intent on having a good time rather than working hard". The band ended up making music akin to stadium rock from the 1980s, with a large amount of overdubs and effects units in place, close to the work of AC/DC. Despite the album having been reportedly finished by August 2004, a direct result of the band's laidback approached saw them re-record each track, and finishing it in October 2004. They restarted with acoustic guitars; Woomble said Allan's playing style aided in changing the structure of the tracks. Hoffer is credited with producing nearly all of the album, except for "I Understand It", which was produced by Eringa. Michael Brauer mixed the recordings at Quad Studios in New York City, before the album was mastered by Chris Athens in November 2004. On the DVD that accompanies Scottish Fiction - Best of 1997-2007, there is a section titled The Making of Warnings/Promises, which includes interviews with the band members and their thoughts on the album.

== Composition and lyrics ==
Musically, the sound of Warnings/Promises has been described as college rock and folk rock that strayed from the band's punk rock roots. Woomble said the band attempted to mesh their American influences, such as Superchunk and Hüsker Dü, with acts that they later discovered, such as the Byrds and Buffalo Springfield, adding in elements of country and folk music. Woomble said in contrast to Jones influencing the sound The Remote Part, Warnings/Promises had "more of my influence on it, bringing it into roots and folksy territories." Warnings/Promises expanded on the reflective nature of The Remote Part, showcasing more of an emphasis on acoustic instrumentation, such as acoustic guitars, piano, and string arrangements. Jones stated that the album is "more stripped back and direct" than previous releases, and that it has a sense of "frailty" to it. Discussing the title, Woomble said it relates to "contradictions that make up people. [...] I think we live our lives being promised about things, and being warned about things". He added that the songs dealt with said contradictions and "working your way through them, seeing both sides, understanding, and accepting them".

The opening track of Warnings/Promises, "Love Steals Us from Loneliness", is a power pop song that continues the sound of The Remote Part with its wall of guitars in vein of that album's opener "You Held the World in Your Arms". The power ballad "Welcome Home", which was reminiscent of "Boulevard of Broken Dreams" (2004) by Green Day, is followed by "I Want a Warning", which saw a return to the sound of the band's earlier releases. "I Understand It" includes vocal harmonies in the style of Crosby, Stills & Nash and elements of electronic music; the Teenage Fanclub-indebted "As If I Hadn't Slept" follows. "Too Long Awake" also returns to the band's roots, and originally started out as an acoustic song before being reworked in the studio. The ballad "Not Just Sometimes But Always" is another track that recalls the work of Teenage Fanclub, as well as ballads from the Britpop era. "The Space Between All Things" showcases Jones' guitar-playing ability, touching on progressive rock partway through. "El Capitan" features violins, acoustic guitarwork and piano, earning it a comparison to the work of Ben Folds Five. It uses the rock formation of the same name as a metaphor for different parts of people's lives. The R.E.M.-esque "Disconnected" is a mid-tempo ballad that has been compared to the work of Starsailor. The initial acoustic iteration of "Too Long Awake" serves as the album's hidden track, tacked onto the end of the closing song "Goodnight".

== Release ==
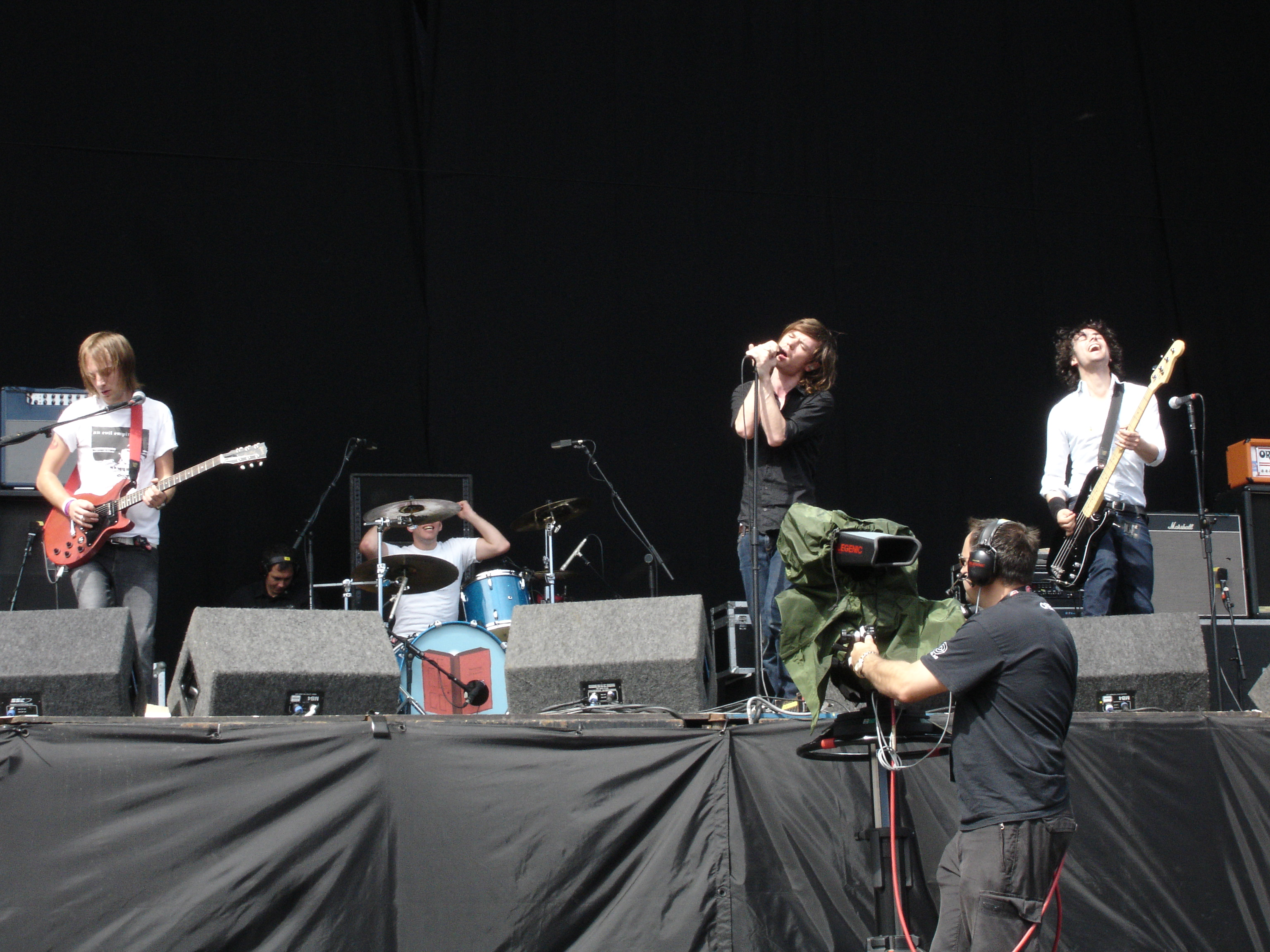
Idlewild performing at V Festival.

On 30 November 2004, Warnings/Promises was announce for release in early 2005. In January 2005, the band played a short tour of the UK, consisting of four acoustic shows. "Love Steals Us from Loneliness" was released as a single on 21 February 2005. Two versions were released on CD: the first with "Gone Too Long", "Don't Let Me Change", and the music video for "Love Steals Us from Loneliness" (directed by Jamie Thraves), while the second included "Hold On to Your Breath". The video is a homage to films by Jean-Luc Godard. Newton said the band struggled to persuade Parlophone to release the song as the first single; he felt it "perfectly bridges where we were with the last album and where we are now". Warnings/Promises was released by Parlophone on 7 March 2005; the album booklet includes a quote from Richard Brautigan. To promote the album, the band did a series of in-store acoustic performances. In April and May 2005, the band embarked on a full-band electric UK tour.

"I Understand It" was released as a single on 2 May 2005. Two versions were released on CD: the first with a cover of "Pleasure and Pain" (1992) by Ben Harper, an acoustic version of "Love Steals Us from Loneliness", and the music video for "I Understand It" (directed by Thraves), while the second featured "The Work We Never Do". Between June and August 2005, the band played a series of festivals, including Isle of Wight, Summer Sundae, and V, interspersed with supporting U2 and R.E.M. for a few shows each. During this, "El Capitan" was released as a single on 11 July 2005. Two versions were released on 7" vinyl: the first with an acoustic version of "The Bronze Medal", while the second included a cover of "Winter Is Blue" (1967) by Vashti Bunyan, and an acoustic version of "El Capitan". The music video for "El Capitan" was directed by Sam Arthur. "As If I Hadn't Slept" was scheduled for release as a single, though was cancelled when the band left Parlophone.

Warnings/Promises was played in full in December 2008 at King Tut's Wah Wah Hut in Glasgow as part of a series of shows where the band performed all of their albums. "Love Steals Us from Loneliness", "El Capitan", "I Understand It", and "As If I Hadn't Slept" were included on the band's first compilation album, Scottish Fiction: Best of 1997–2007 (2007), alongside the music videos for all of the album's singles. "Love Steals Us from Loneliness", "El Capitan", "Too Long Awake", and "Not Just Sometimes But Always" were included on the band's third compilation album, The Collection (2010).

== Reception ==
Professional ratings
Aggregate scores
Source	Rating
Metacritic	66/100
Review scores
Source	Rating
AllMusic	4.5/5 stars
Drowned in Sound	7/10
The Guardian	3/5 stars
NME	9/10
Pitchfork	6.2/10
Q	3/5 stars
Robert Christgau	(dud)
Rolling Stone	3/5 stars
Stylus	C
Yahoo! Launch	7/10 stars

Warnings/Promises was met with generally favourable reviews from music critics. At Metacritic, which assigns a normalized rating out of 100 to reviews from mainstream publications, the album received an average score of 66, based on 20 reviews.

AllMusic reviewer John D. Luerssen said the album "feels even more adventurous" than their past albums "this time out". He added that the way the band have been operating "may have kept them out of the limelight until now, but it's only a matter of time" until they return to prominence. In a review for NME, Mark Beaumont wrote that "where The Remote Part was their 'Green'-esque lunge into the spotlight, Warnings/Promises is their full-blown 'Out of Time' spectacular. But with less twangle, more teeth." The staff at E! Online expanded on this R.E.M. comparison, stating that it "doesn't quite have any melodies that rival 'Losing My Religion' or even 'All the Way to Reno,' for that matter". Drowned in Sound's Gareth Dobson saw it as "the work of a band pushing itself to the limits of its generous, but ultimately not boundless musical ability". He added that the band's decision to make an album of "such landmark size and scope has finally stripped the Icarus Woomble of his wings". In a review for Rolling Stone, Rob Sheffield wrote that the album was "even better" than the preceding one, "a set of hopeless love songs for sad-eyed city girls".

Yahoo! Launch's Anna Britten said the band's choice to let all of the members write material is a "ghastly idea, yielding gutless musical porridge that thrills no-one". She clarified that the album "isn’t quite that bad, but it’ll disappoint any red-blooded rock lover expecting a cavalry charge." Betty Clarke of The Guardian wrote that the album is a "slightly awkward composite of the band's old strengths and a flurry of new ideas", while Woomble's lyrics have "sunk deeper into disillusion". Pitchfork contributor Jason Crock said the album follows the "same direction" as the previous one: "the work of a polished radio-ready rock band, and if I had to sum it up in a word, it'd be 'comfortable'". Stylus writer Nick Southall saw it as a "back-to-basics" effort where the band's "unbound fury became passion and then became earnestness". In spite of this, none of the tracks featured "melodies which lodge themselves"; he highlighted a B-side "A Distant History" from one of their earlier singles as being "better than anything here." Robert Christgau considered the album a "dud".

Warnings/Promises charted at number five in Scotland, and number nine in the UK. It also reached number 50 in Ireland. "Love Steals Us from Loneliness" charted at number six in Scotland, number 16 in the UK, and number 37 in Ireland. "I Understand It" charted at number 32 in the UK. "El Capitan" charted at number 39 in the UK. Warnings/Promises was certified silver by the British Phonographic Industry (BPI). The Village Voice included the album on their Pazz & Jop Albums of 2005 list at number 245.

== Track listing ==
All songs written by Idlewild.

1. "Love Steals Us from Loneliness" – 3:12
2. "Welcome Home" – 3:15
3. "I Want a Warning" – 3:35
4. "I Understand It" – 3:20
5. "As If I Hadn't Slept" – 3:36
6. "Too Long Awake" – 3:07
7. "Not Just Sometimes But Always" – 3:33
8. "The Space Between All Things" – 4:12
9. "El Capitan" – 3:57
10. "Blame It on Obvious Ways" – 3:24
11. "Disconnected" – 3:51
12. "Goodnight" – 8:06 (includes hidden track "Too Long Awake (reprise)")

== Personnel ==
Personnel per booklet.

Idlewild

- Gavin Fox – bass
- Rod Jones – guitar
- Colin Newton – drums
- Allan Stewart – guitar
- Roddy Woomble – vocals

Additional musicians

- Inara George – additional vocals (tracks 1, 3, 6 and 12)
- Greg Leisz – pedal steel guitar (tracks 5 and 11)
- Paul Maroon – piano (track 5)

Production and design

- Tony Hoffer – producer
- Todd Burke – engineer
- Dave Eringa – producer (track 4)
- Guy Massey – engineer (track 4)
- Michael Brauer – mixing
- Chris Athens – mastering
- The Head of State – artwork
- Roddy Woomble – photography
- Jennifer Juniper Strattford – photography

== Charts and certifications ==
=== Weekly charts ===
Chart performance for Warnings/Promises
Charts (2005–2024)	Peak position
Hungarian Physical Albums (MAHASZ)	25
Irish Albums (IRMA)	50
Scottish Albums (OCC)	5
UK Albums (OCC)	9

=== Certifications ===
Certifications for Warnings/Promises
Region	Certification	Certified units/sales
United Kingdom (BPI)	Silver	60,000^{^}
^{^} Shipments figures based on certification alone.
