= A Film for the Future =

A Film for the Future may refer to:

- "A Film for the Future", a song by Idlewild on the 1998 album Hope Is Important
- A Film for the Future, a visual album by Coldplay released in 2025 as the companion for the 2024 album Moon Music
