= Interview Music =

Studio album by Idlewild
- Released: 5 April 2019
- Genre: Indie rock; alternative rock
- Length: 52:31
- Label: Empty Words
- Producer: Dave Eringa

Idlewild chronology
| Everything Ever Written (2015) | Interview Music (2019) | Idlewild (2025) |

Interview Music ratings
Aggregate scores
| Source | Rating |
|---|---|
| AnyDecentMusic? | 6.4/10 |
| Metacritic | 69/100 |
Review scores
| Source | Rating |
| Clash | 8/10 |
| Gigwise | 6/10 stars |
| NME | 4/5 stars |
| PopMatters | 8/10 |
| The Skinny | 4/5 stars |
| Sputnikmusic | 2/5 |
| Under the Radar | 4.5/10 stars |
| XSNoize | 8/10 |

Interview Music is the ninth studio album by Scottish indie rock band Idlewild, released on 5 April 2019 on Empty Words Records. It was produced by Dave Eringa, who had worked on the band's previous albums 100 Broken Windows and The Remote Part. It reached No. 22 on the UK Albums Chart and No. 1 on the Scottish Albums Chart.

== Track listing ==
All tracks are written by Idlewild.

Interview Music track listing
| No. | Title | Length |
|---|---|---|
| 1. | "Dream Variations" | 5:03 |
| 2. | "There's a Place for Everything" | 3:37 |
| 3. | "Interview Music" | 4:59 |
| 4. | "All These Words" | 4:32 |
| 5. | "You Wear It Secondhand" | 4:26 |
| 6. | "Same Things Twice" | 3:46 |
| 7. | "I Almost Didn't Notice" | 5:01 |
| 8. | "Miracles" | 2:12 |
| 9. | "Mount Analogue" | 4:52 |
| 10. | "Forever New" | 3:25 |
| 11. | "Bad Logic" | 2:26 |
| 12. | "Familiar to Ignore" | 4:52 |
| 13. | "Lake Martinez" | 3:20 |
| Total length: | | 52:31 |

== Personnel ==
=== Idlewild ===
- Roddy Woomble – lead vocals, acoustic guitar
- Rod Jones – electric guitar, acoustic guitar
- Colin Newton – drums, percussion
- Andrew Mitchell – bass guitar, backing vocals
- Luciano Rossi – piano, keyboards, backing vocals

=== Recording personnel ===
- Dave Eringa – producer, mixing
