= Everything Ever Written =

Studio album by Idlewild
- Released: 16 February 2015
- Recorded: 2013–2015
- Studio: Chamber Studios, The Depot, Jane Street Studios, Edinburgh; An Tobar, Isle of Mull
- Genre: Indie rock
- Length: 54:05
- Label: Empty Words
- Producer: Rod Jones

Idlewild chronology
Post Electric Blues (2009)	Everything Ever Written (2015)	Interview Music (2019)

Singles from Everything Ever Written
- 1. "Collect Yourself" Released: 17 November 2014; 2. "Come on Ghost" Released: 8 January 2015

Everything Ever Written is the eighth studio album by Scottish indie rock band Idlewild, released on 16 February 2015 on Empty Words Records. Produced by guitarist Rod Jones, the album was recorded after a lengthy hiatus, during which the future of the band was uncertain. The album is the first to feature keyboardist Luciano Rossi and guitarist and bassist Andrew Mitchell.

== Background ==
In 2009, Idlewild released its crowd-funded sixth studio album, Post Electric Blues. By the end of the following year, the band embarked upon an "indefinite hiatus" after touring commitments ceased. Vocalist Roddy Woomble noted, "My interest was kind of decreasing with what, latterly, we did with Idlewild, because it was very traddy rock-band, you know, rhythm player, lead player, bass, drums – I think we made some great records like that and had some great concerts, but I wasn't interested in doing that." In late 2010, the band issued a tenth anniversary of its second studio album, 100 Broken Windows (2000), and spent their final performances performing the album in its entirety. Woomble stated: "The gigs were bittersweet because we knew we were at the end."

During the band's hiatus, Roddy Woomble recorded and released two solo albums, The Impossible Song & Other Songs (2011) and Listen to Keep (2013), guitarist Rod Jones formed the indie rock band The Birthday Suit, releasing three studio albums, while drummer Colin Newton moved to Canada.

=== Reunion ===
In 2013, Woomble and Jones began writing with one another again: "For two or three years we didn’t really have much contact with each other, creatively speaking, but very naturally, at the start of 2013 it started to happen. [...] There was always an understanding between Rod and myself and Colin that we’d work on another record at some point, whether it would be two years, three years, ten years. We’d come too far to just close the door." Long-time guitarist Allan Stewart and bass guitarist Gareth Russell remained absent from the sessions, with Woomble noting, "Gareth and Allan have not been involved much so far due to both their other touring commitments, but they will be in time, as will others." Ultimately, both did not participate in the writing and recording of Everything Ever Written and amicably parted from the band. Allan Stewart eventually rejoined Idlewild in 2019.

== Recording ==
=== Production ===
Recording began in late 2013, with guitarist Rod Jones occupying the role of producer. Regarding his production influences, Jones stated: "I'm a big fan of Wilco and Jeff Tweedy, I'm a big fan of how their records are so much lower than other peoples, not in terms of volume but in terms of tone. I like to think of them as thick, like a nice thick broth. It's a strange analogy, but that's the one we use."

== Track listing ==
All tracks are written by Idlewild.

Everything Ever Written track listing
No.	Title	Length
1.	"Collect Yourself"	4:39
2.	"Come on Ghost"	4:17
3.	"So Many Things to Decide"	4:12
4.	"Nothing I Can Do About It"	4:47
5.	"Every Little Means Trust"	3:40
6.	"(Use It) If You Can Use It"	7:11
7.	"Like a Clown"	4:57
8.	"On Another Planet"	3:20
9.	"All Things Different"	4:27
10.	"Radium Girl"	3:19
11.	"Left Like Roses"	5:02
12.	"Utopia"	4:14
Total length:		54:05

== Personnel ==
=== Idlewild ===
- Roddy Woomble – lead vocals, acoustic guitar (3)
- Rod Jones – electric guitar, acoustic guitar (7), backing vocals, trumpet (9), string arrangements
- Colin Newton – drums, percussion, filing cabinet (7)
- Andrew Mitchell – bass guitar (1, 3, 4, 10, 11), acoustic guitar (2, 5), electric guitar (6), backing vocals
- Luciano Rossi – piano (2, 4, 5, 6, 9, 10, 11, 12), Hammond organ (1, 3, 5, 10), keyboards (4, 7), organ (7, 8), Farfisa organ (6), prepared piano (2), harmonium (9, 12), Mellotron (10), Rhodes (10, 11), backing vocals

=== Additional musicians ===
- David Jack – bass guitar (2, 5, 6, 8)
- Gordon MacLean – double bass (7, 9, 12)
- Hannah Fisher – violin (3), backing vocals (1, 3, 4, 5)
- Sam Irvine – saxophone (2, 6)
- Henry Bird – trumpet and trombone (2, 6)
- Catrin Pryce-Jones – violin (2, 4, 5)
- Ailsa Taylor – violin (2, 4, 5)
- Cavan Campbell – viola (2, 4, 5)
- Maya Burman-Roy – cello (2, 4, 5)
- Graeme Young – marching snare (4)
- Reuben Taylor – organ portamento strip (11)

=== Recording personnel ===
- Rod Jones – producer
- Kris Pohl – engineer
- Graeme Young – additional engineering
- Craig Ross – additional engineering
- Gordon MacLean – additional engineering
- Owen Mulholland – additional engineering
- John Agnello – mixing
- Dave Eringa – mixing (8)
- Steve Fallone – mastering

=== Artwork ===
- Andrew Wightman – front cover illustration
- Oscan Sansom – band photography
