= A Distant History: Rarities 1997–2007 =

A Distant History – Rarities 1997–2007

Compilation album by Idlewild
- Released: 29 October 2007
- Recorded: 1997–2007
- Genre: Rock
- Label: Parlophone/EMI

Idlewild chronology
| Scottish Fiction: Best of 1997–2007 (2007) | A Distant History – Rarities 1997–2007 (2007) | Post Electric Blues (2009) |

Professional ratings
Review scores
| Source | Rating |
|---|---|
| NME | 5/10 (10/27/2007, p. 39) |

A Distant History: Rarities 1997–2007 is a download-only compilation album by the Scottish rock band Idlewild, released on 29 October 2007, on Parlophone. The album is a companion piece to Scottish Fiction: Best of 1997–2007 and is composed of rarities and B-sides from throughout the band's career.

According to the band's mailing list, the track listing was chosen by the band themselves.

== Track listing ==
Source: Amazon

| No. | Title | Length |
|---|---|---|
| 1. | "Queen of the Troubled Teens" | 2:17 |
| 2. | "Self Healer" | 2:00 |
| 3. | "Chandelier" | 2:21 |
| 4. | "I Want To Be A Writer" | 1:48 |
| 5. | "Satan Polaroid" | 3:18 |
| 6. | "This Is Worse" | 3:39 |
| 7. | "You Don't Have The Heart" (Live at the Glasgow Garage) | 2:07 |
| 8. | "There's Glory in Your Story" | 1:58 |
| 9. | "A Distant History" | 4:36 |
| 10. | "I Was Made To Think It" | 4:01 |
| 11. | "Poor Thing" | 4:18 |
| 12. | "The Nothing I Know" | 4:26 |
| 13. | "Everything Flows" (Teenage Fanclub cover) | 3:34 |
| 14. | "I Found That Essence Rare" (Gang of Four cover) | 3:04 |
| 15. | "Hold on To Your Breath" | 3:55 |
| 16. | "Gone Too Long" | 2:59 |
| 17. | "Don't Let Me Change" | 4:44 |
| 18. | "El Capitan" (Acoustic) | 4:07 |
| 19. | "Winter Is Blue" (Vashti Bunyan cover) | 2:15 |
| 20. | "Hidden Ways" | 2:41 |
