= Learning Greek =

Studio album by Humour
- Released: 8 August 2025
- Length: 30:52
- Label: So Young
- Producer: Rod Jones

Humour chronology
A Small Crowd Gathered to Watch Me (2023)	Learning Greek (2025)

Singles from Learning Greek
- 1. "Plagiarist" Released: 29 April 2025

Learning Greek is the debut studio album by Scottish avant-punk band Humour. It was released on 8 August 2025 via So Young in LP, CD and digital formats.

== Background ==
Preceded by the band's 2023 EP, A Small Crowd Gathered to Watch Me, and produced by Rod Jones in his studio in Edinburgh, the album centers on the theme of death reflection. "Plagiarist" was released as a single on 29 April 2025. Andreas Christoloudis of the band stated, "Plagiarist is about being a lyricist and having run out of ideas and inspiration."

== Reception ==
Professional ratings
Review scores
Source	Rating
Clash	8/10
DIY	4/5 stars
Kerrang	3/5

James Hingle of Kerrang! described the album as "never boring" and "chaotic, clever, and just unhinged enough to charm the eyeliner off your face." It was noted as retaining "the very essence of Humour, with their vividly unique view of the human condition" by Clash's Julia Mason, who rated the album eight out of ten.

In a four-star review for DIY, Brad Sked referred to it as "a solid first LP that aims for dive bars and festival fields alike," noting it "sees the Glasgow outfit departing somewhat from their early art punk, hinting at more crossover appeal." Writing for Louder Than War, Adam Brady remarked, "The emotional content and impactful lyrical content is matched by the music. It's powerful, heartrending, personal and exploratory."

== Track listing ==
All tracks are written by Humour.

Learning Greek track listing
No.	Title	Length
1.	"Neighbours"	2:45
2.	"Memorial"	2:22
3.	"Plagiarist"	3:12
4.	"Learning Greek"	0:59
5.	"Dirty Bread"	3:19
6.	"Die Rich"	2:54
7.	"I Knew We'd Talk About It One Day"	3:27
8.	"Aphid"	3:10
9.	"I Only Have Eyes for You" (featuring Theo Bleak)	2:21
10.	"In the Paddies"	4:02
11.	"It Happened in the Sun"	2:21
Total length:		30:52

== Personnel ==
Credits adapted from the album's liner notes and Tidal.

=== Humour ===
- Andreas Christodoulidis – lead vocals, artwork
- Lewis Doig – bass guitar
- Jack Lyall – electric guitar, background vocals
- Ross Patrizio – electric guitar, background vocals
- Ruairidh Smith – drums

=== Additional contributors ===
- Rod Jones – production, mixing
- John Webber – mastering
- Theo Bleak – guest vocals on "I Only Have Eyes"
