= Captain (album) =

EP by Idlewild
- Released: January 1998
- Recorded: October 1997
- Genre: Post-hardcore, indie rock
- Length: 19:47; 24:54 (Japan)
- Label: Deceptive Records
- Producer: Paul Tipler

Idlewild chronology
| Captain (1998) | Hope Is Important (1998) |

Singles from Captain
- 1. "Satan Polaroid" Released: February 1998

Professional ratings
Review scores
| Source | Rating |
|---|---|
| The Encyclopedia of Popular Music | 3/5 stars |
| NME | 8/10 |

Captain is the first release by the Scottish rock band Idlewild, issued by Deceptive Records in 1998. Although the number of tracks would normally classify it as an EP, Captain is commonly known as a mini-album. The guitarist Rod Jones notes that the album "was a sort of introduction to Idlewild".

The album was produced by Paul Tipler in the first week of October 1997 at River Studios, London.

In an interview in 2007, Roddy Woomble spoke about the album, saying that he "was singing in an American accent, y’know! Of course it’s how we found our feet – I was deeply into Tom Barman, and even though he’s Belgian he sang in an American accent, and I thought if he could do it so could I. But after the first album, I found another voice, my own voice."

The album was played in full alongside Make Another World, on 21 December 2008.

== Track listing ==
All tracks written and composed by Idlewild.

1. "Self Healer" - 1:58
2. "Annihilate Now!" - 3:32
3. "Captain" - 3:35
4. "Last Night I Missed All the Fireworks" - 1:24
5. "Satan Polaroid" - 3:17
6. "You Just Have to Be Who You Are" - 5:57
7. "Queen Of The Troubled Teens" - 2:15 (Japan bonus track)
8. "Faster" - 1:51 (Japan bonus track)
9. "Self Healer (1st Version)" - 2:24 (Japan bonus track)
10. "House Alone" - 1:34 (Japan bonus track)

== Personnel ==
- Bob Fairfoull - bass guitar
- Rod Jones - guitar
- Colin Newton - drums
- Roddy Woomble - vocals
- Paul "The Captain" Tipler - producer
- Ian Ritterskamp - photography
