= Make Another World =

Studio album by Idlewild
- Released: 5 March 2007
- Recorded: Sub Station, Rosyth
- Genre: Rock
- Length: 34:38
- Label: Sequel
- Producer: Dave Eringa

Idlewild chronology
Warnings/Promises (2005)	Make Another World (2007)	Post Electric Blues (2009)

Singles from Make Another World
- 1. "If It Takes You Home" Released: 2006; 2. "No Emotion" Released: 26 February 2007; 3. "A Ghost in the Arcade" Released: 18 June 2007

Professional ratings
Aggregate scores
Source	Rating
Metacritic	65/100
Review scores
Source	Rating
AbsolutePunk.net	(81%) link
Allmusic	link
Entertainment Weekly	(A−) link
NME	(6/10) link
Kerrang!	4/5 stars
Popmatters	(7/10) link
Pitchfork Media	(6.2/10) link
Q	(Mar 2007, p.112)
The Skinny	link

Make Another World is the fifth full-length studio album by the Scottish rock band Idlewild, released on 5 March 2007 through Sequel Records. The album is the first with bass guitarist Gareth Russell, following Gavin Fox's departure at the end of 2005, and is their first since leaving Parlophone. Vocalist Roddy Woomble said that the band "made a conscious decision to make a strong, loud, rock record."

According to the guitarist Rod Jones, the album references each of the band's previous albums, and is a "summing up of the past twelve years". The album was noted for its return to Idlewild's heavier roots, while continuing to maintain a strong sense of melody as displayed on more recent albums. Q described the album as "the sound of a band re-energised."

The album reached No. 24 on the UK Album Chart and, according to Woomble, has sold "40,000 copies, even though the record label effectively closed down just after it was released." "No Emotion" was released to American radio on 6 March 2007.

The album was performed in full on 21 December 2008, alongside their first album, Captain, at King Tut's Wah Wah Hut in Glasgow. In an interview following the gig, the guitarist Rod Jones said that the album - alongside Warnings/Promises - is his favourite release, saying that he "feels that we have become better at our craft as time goes on and I feel more confident in our song-writing as time goes by."

== Background and recording ==
Make Another World was recorded at Sub Station in Rosyth, with producer and engineer Dave Eringa. He later mixed the recordings at Strongroom in London, before the album was mastered by Howie Weinberg at Masterdisck in New York.

Guitarist Allan Stewart noted that "the new songs are getting a great reception when we play them live. I think people were expecting more acoustic stuff, so the fact that it’s more upbeat surprises some people. I think people like the loud songs live, but there is still a mix on it. It is balanced – it’s pretty heavy in places!” and said that the band “wrote this record when we didn’t have a label, so there were no A&R people on the phone. We were on our own, we wrote the record and then when Sanctuary came to us it was all but done. It was nice in that way that we had so much freedom."

== Artwork ==
According to the vocalist Roddy Woomble, the band "enlisted our tour manager (and t-shirt designer) Dominic to do the album art. Dom’s covered in tattoos and loves all the iconic, sailor Jerry, tattoo artwork, so it went along those lines, with photos of a naked girl in a Mexican wrestlers mask inside the booklet. You’d have to ask him about the symbolism, but I for one, thought it was striking and stark, like a lot of the songs."

== Track listing ==
All songs written by Idlewild.

1. "In Competition for the Worst Time" – 2:43
2. "Everything (As It Moves)" – 3:22
3. "No Emotion" – 3:04
4. "Make Another World" – 4:06
5. "If It Takes You Home" – 2:07
6. "Future Works" – 4:16
7. "You and I Are Both Away" – 3:50
8. "A Ghost in the Arcade" – 2:48
9. "Once in Your Life" – 4:29
10. "Finished It Remains" – 3:53

B-Sides

- "Hidden Ways"
- "Lookin' for a Love" (Neil Young)

== Personnel ==
Personnel per booklet.

Idlewild

- Rod Jones – guitar, keyboards, vocals
- Colin Newton – drums, percussion
- Gareth Russell – bass guitar
- Allan Stewart – guitars, vocals
- Roddy Woomble – lead vocals

Additional musicians

- Inara George – vocals
- Mick Cooke – trumpet, French horn
- Tom Smith – trombone

Production and design

- Dave Eringa – producer, engineer, mixing
- Howie Weinberg – mastering
- An Evil Empire – design, photography
