= Hope Is Important =

Studio album by Idlewild
- Released: 26 October 1998
- Recorded: 8 February 1998 – 22 June 1998
- Studio: Chapel, Lincolnshire, England; Westland, Dublin, Ireland
- Genre: Grunge; punk rock
- Length: 35:48
- Label: Food
- Producer: Paul Tipler

Idlewild chronology
| Captain (1998) | Hope Is Important (1998) | 100 Broken Windows (2000) |

Singles from Hope Is Important
- 1. "A Film for the Future" Released: 27 April 1998; 2. "Everyone Says You're So Fragile" Released: 6 July 1998; 3. "I'm a Message" Released: 12 October 1998; 4. "When I Argue I See Shapes" Released: 5 February 1999

Hope Is Important is the debut studio album by the Scottish rock band Idlewild, released 26 October 1998 by Food Records. After finalising their line-up and releasing two singles in 1997, the band released their mini album Captain in early 1998. Afterwards, the band signed with Food and recorded their debut album between February and June 1998 at Chapel Studios in Lincolnshire and Westland Studios in Dublin with producer Paul Tipler. Described as a grunge and punk rock album, Hope Is Important was compared to Bleach (1989) by Nirvana.

"A Film for the Future" and "Everyone Says You're So Fragile" were released as the album's first two singles on 27 April 1998 and 6 July 1998, respectively. They were followed with some festival performances and a tour with labelmates Blur. The album's third single, "I'm a Message", was released on 12 October 1998. Early in 1999, the band went on tour in the UK. On February 5, 1999, the band released the album's fourth single, "When I Argue I See Shapes."

Hope Is Important received generally favourable reviews from music critics, some of whom praised the songwriting and Idlewild's energy. The album charted at number 44 in Scotland, and number 53 in the UK; it was also certified silver in the UK. All of the songs appeared on the Scottish and UK Singles Charts, with "When I Argue I See Shapes" charting the highest at number 15 in Scotland, and number 19 in the UK. Hope Is Important appeared on a best-of-the-year album list by NME, as well as a best Scottish albums list by The Herald.

== Background and production ==
Roddy Woomble lived in Greenville, South Carolina, USA, between the ages of 13 and 15, where his music taste assimilated various punk and alternative rock albums. Upon moving to Scotland, he wanted to start a band that emulated the sound of those releases. In late 1995, Idlewild formed in Edinburgh, with its initial line-up consisting of Woomble on vocals, Rod Jones on guitar, Phil Scanlon on bass, and Colin Newton on drums. After a year of touring, the band released their debut single, "Queen of the Troubled Teens", in March 1997 through local label Human Condition. The band parted ways with Scanlon and replaced him with Bob Fairfoull. As "Queen of the Troubled Teens" received attention from media outlets, the band signed with Fierce Panda Records. With this label, the band released their next single "Chandelier" in December 1997. The band released the mini album Captain in January 1998; it was intended as a single for Deceptive Records before becoming a mini album.

Around this time, the members had abandoned plans for university or employment to focus on the band full-time, and Bruce Craigie became their manager. Publicity from their live performances, which included tours with Midget and the Warm Jets, resulted in the band signing with Food Records. Hope Is Important was recorded in several separate sessions throughout 1998: 8–12 February and 5–17 April at Chapel Studios in Lincolnshire, and 9–22 June at Westland Studios in Dublin. Tipler produced the sessions, and mixed the recordings in July 1998 at Matrix Wessex in London. They were assisted at Chapel by James Anderson, at Westland by Dave Slevin, and at Wessex by Andrew Nicolls. Woomble that the album was recorded "in stages" as the band's label wanted them to tour as much as they could: "So rather than laterally we would record an album in one go, or two gos, we kind of did bits and pieces all through that year until the album was done."

== Composition and lyrics ==
Musically, the sound of Hope Is Important has been described as grunge and punk rock, with influence from indie rock, drawing comparison to Bleach (1989) by Nirvana. Woomble said the album's title could be interpreted as "either the most positive thing you could ever say or the vaguest statement you could ever make". Half of the tracks were written in 1997, with the remainder being done in the opening months of 1998. Author Andy Greenwald said the album switched between "minute-long punk screamfests" and "string-laden melodic odes". In 2008, Woomble viewed it as an "incomplete album" due to its sound of an artist that is "split between their past and future and with barely any studio experience to document it properly".

The album opens with the hardcore punk song "You've Lost Your Way", an earlier version of which was sung by Jones. Woomble said it was a fair representation of the band's live performances from the time period due to its abrasive and upbeat sound. "A Film for the Future" was cited by Woomble as an example of Jones and Fairfoull "working together to make a better rock song", and how it detailed the little interest he had in his film studies at university. "Paint Nothing" evokes the sound of Talking Heads, and mixed jangle pop with distortion. The song talks about the times the band used to visit the club The Egg during the Britpop era, a period that Woomble disliked. The band, sans Woomble, wrote "When I Argue I See Shapes"; they attempted to pay tribute to Pavement. Woomble came up with its lyrics, which were influenced by arguments he was having with his girlfriend, at their rehearsal space in Tollcross, Edinburgh.

Woomble had been in pub bands prior to Idlewild, many of whom styled themselves after the Velvet Underground. "4 People Do Good" was written as a reaction to those acts, as all he "really wanted to do was rock out". "I'm Happy to Be Here Tonight" is an acoustic song that was compared to R.E.M. Its title paraphrases Andy Warhol's catchphrase, which he would say after arriving at a party. Woomble said the band were concerned "Everyone Says You're So Fragile" would get them shoehorned into the UK pop-punk scene, with the likes of Midget, Snug, and Symposium, despite the song being considered a throwaway. The song was influenced by underground American indie rock bands they were listening to, such as Archers of Loaf, Magnapop, and Superchunk. Woomble said "I'm a Message" was simply a "great little pop song".

The lo-fi track "You Don't Have the Heart" was one of the last tracks written for the album. The band tried to emulate the Jesus Lizard with the song's chorus sections. Justine Frischmann of Elastica was scheduled to sing during the verses, but had to cancel due to issues with her tonsils. As a result, the band brought in Salli Carson, who did administrative work at Deceptive Records. "Close the Door", another lo-fi song, features the lyric "barbecue lungs", which was a reference to the amount of cigarettes the band were smoking. Ken Rice, a school teacher from Dublin, plays violin on "Safe and Sound". Its title was taken from a bridge that had been graffitied on the M6 motorway. The album closes with another hardcore punk track, "Low Light". When played live, it would often stretch to over ten minutes in length. Tipler, who had seen the band live several times, decided to tackle the song from a live perspective. He had the band play live-in-the-studio after drinking several beverages.

== Release ==
"A Film for the Future" was released as a single on 27 April 1998 with "Mince Showercap (Part 1)" and "What Am I Going to Do?", which was followed by the band performing at the Glastonbury Festival. "Everyone Says You're So Fragile" was released as a single on 6 July 1998 with "Mince Showercap (Part 2)" and "Theory of Achievement". Additional performances at other festivals, and a stint with labelmates Blur followed. "I'm a Message" was released as a single on 12 October 1998; two versions were released on CD: the first included "Mince Showercap (Part 3)" and "This Is Worse", while the second also had radio session versions of "Satan Polaroid" and "You've Lost Your Way". Music videos for "A Film for the Future", "Everyone Says You're So Fragile", and "I'm a Message" were directed by Berg.

Hope Is Important was released on 26 October 1998 through Food Records. To promote the release, the band supported Ash on their European tour. In January and February 1999, the band toured the UK as part of the NME Premier Tour with Unkle, Delakota, and the Llama Farmers. A re-recorded version of "When I Argue I See Shapes" was released as a single on 1 February 1999. Two versions were released on CD: the first with a cover of "Palace Flophouse" (1999) by Peeps into Fairyland and a re-recorded version of "Chandelier", while the second featured the album version of "When I Argue I See Shapes", alongside "(1903-70)" and a live version of "Last Night I Missed All the Fireworks". The music video for "When I Argue I See Shapes" was directed by filmmaker duo James and Alex. In March 1999, the band performed at the Bowlie Weekender. Hope Is Important was released in the United States on 12 October 1999 through Odeon and Capitol Records.

Hope Is Important was played in full in December 2008 at King Tut's Wah Wah Hut in Glasgow as part of a series of shows where the band performed all of their albums. It was released as a two-CD package with their second studio album 100 Broken Windows in 2002. "When I Argue I See Shapes" and "I'm a Message" were included on the band's first greatest hits compilation album, Scottish Fiction: Best of 1997–2007 (2007), alongside the music videos for all of the album's singles. "When I Argue I See Shapes", "I'm Happy to Be Here Tonight", and "Everyone Says You're So Fragile" were included on the band's third compilation album, The Collection (2010).

== Reception ==
=== Critical response ===
Professional ratings
Review scores
| Source | Rating |
|---|---|
| AllMusic | 2.5/5 stars |
| Entertainment Weekly | A |
| NME | 8/10 |
| Pitchfork | 6/10 |
| The Rolling Stone Album Guide | 3.5/5 stars |
| Tiny Mix Tapes | 4/5 stars |
| The Village Voice | A− |

Hope Is Important was met with generally favourable reviews from music critics. Entertainment Weekly writer Mike Flaherty said the band of "pop craftsmen [were] more mature than four years together would indicate, gilding sophisticated pop tunesmanship with a ragged indie edge". NME's Jim Wirth wrote that the album had a "proper pop sensibility" that was "alive with imaginative twists and the sort of impenetrable lyrics that made early Manics singles so special". In a review for The Village Voice, Robert Christgau wrote that the band were "sometimes lyrical, sometimes heavy, mostly headlong, less confused than the people they write to and about". The staff at Tiny Mix Tapes said the album is "one of those records that just grabs you", with the band able to "truly transcend their inspirations and create music which sounds truly original". Ink 19 writer David Lee Beowülf saw it as "schizophrenic", but also "pretty darn hard and punk", which Christina Apeles of Consumable Online agreed with.

AllMusic reviewer MacKenzie Wilson said the album "exudes the fiery nature of four young guys yearning to make their own way in modern rock despite the popularity of the three-chord riff". She said the lyrics were not as poetic as they would be on the band's second studio album 100 Broken Windows (2000), "[b]ut it's there, and it's enjoyably humorous". In The Rolling Stone Album Guide, Chris Ryan said the album is "very much a love letter to their favorite bands". Pitchfork joint writers Beatty and Garrett noted the short timeframe of recording, leading to the album coming across as "immediate and desperate", with some of the songs that would have been discarded otherwise "deposited onto the album as filler".

=== Commercial performance and accolades ===
Hope Is Important peaked at number 44 in Scotland, and number 53 in the UK. "A Film for the Future" charted at number 39 in Scotland, and number 53 in the UK. "Everyone Says You're So Fragile" charted at number 42 in Scotland, and number 47 in the UK. "I'm a Message" charted at number 31 in Scotland, and number 41 in the UK. "When I Argue I See Shapes" charted at number 15 in Scotland, and number 19 in the UK. Hope Is Important was certified silver by the British Phonographic Industry.

Hope Is Important was included in a list of writers' favourite Scottish albums by The Herald, where journalist Martin Williams described it as "a startling explosion of singalong hooks, soft-loud dynamics and crashing guitars". NME ranked it at number 33 on their list of the top 50 albums of the year. Mastersystem have cited it and 100 Broken Windows as influences on their debut album Dance Music (2018).

== Track listing ==
Track listing per sleeve.

| No. | Title | Length |
|---|---|---|
| 1. | "You've Lost Your Way" | 1:30 |
| 2. | "A Film for the Future" | 3:28 |
| 3. | "Paint Nothing" | 3:12 |
| 4. | "When I Argue I See Shapes" | 4:26 |
| 5. | "4 People Do Good" | 2:00 |
| 6. | "I'm Happy to Be Here Tonight" | 3:11 |
| 7. | "Everyone Says You're So Fragile" | 2:18 |
| 8. | "I'm a Message" | 2:28 |
| 9. | "You Don't Have the Heart" | 2:08 |
| 10. | "Close the Door" | 2:20 |
| 11. | "Safe and Sound" | 3:15 |
| 12. | "Low Light" | 5:32 |

== Personnel ==
Personnel per booklet.

Idlewild

- Bob Fairfoull – bass
- Rod Jones – guitar
- Colin Newton – drums
- Roddy Woomble – vocals

Additional musicians

- Ken Rice – violin (track 11)
- Salli Carson – vocals (track 9)

Production and design

- Paul Tipler – producer, mixing
- James Anderson – studio assistant
- Dave Slevin – studio assistant
- Andrew Nicolls – studio assistant
- Roddy Woomble – photography
- Ian Ritterskamp – band photography
- Anonymous – design

== Charts and certifications ==
=== Weekly charts ===
Chart performance for Hope Is Important
| Chart (1998) | Peak position |
|---|---|
| Scottish Albums (OCC) | 44 |
| UK Albums (OCC) | 53 |

=== Certifications ===
Certifications for Hope Is Important
| Region | Certification | Certified units/sales |
|---|---|---|
| United Kingdom (BPI) | Silver | 60,000^{^} |
^{^} Shipments figures based on certification alone.
