= Idlewild (band) =

Scottish rock band

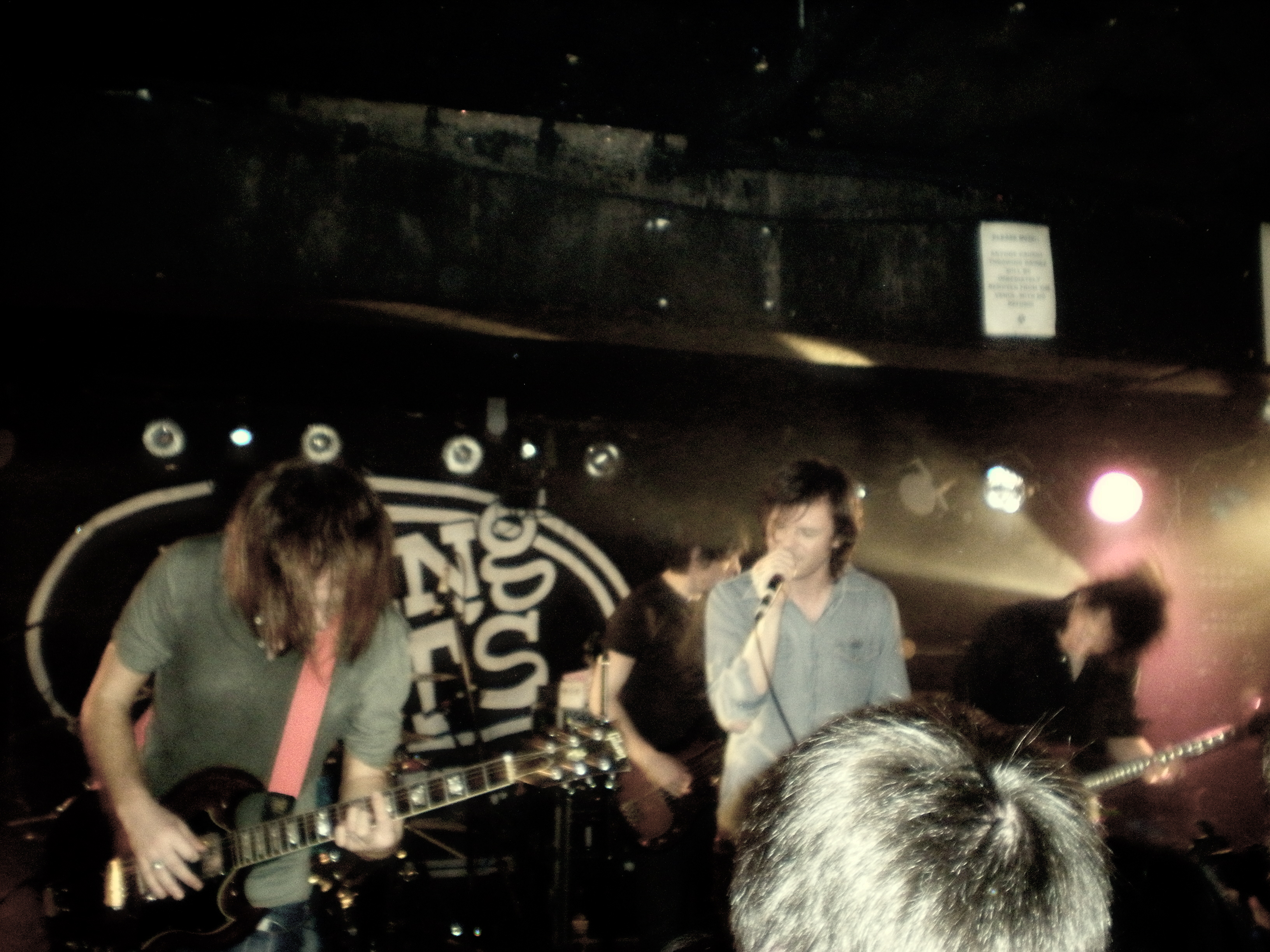
- Idlewild performing at King Tut's Wah Wah Hut, December 2008

Background information
- Origin: Edinburgh, Scotland
- Genres: Indie rock; alternative rock; post-Britpop; punk rock
- Years active: 1995–2010; 2013–present
- Labels: V2; Cooking Vinyl; Sanctuary; Pye; Parlophone; Capitol
- Members: Roddy Woomble; Rod Jones; Colin Newton; Luciano Rossi; Andrew Mitchell; Allan Stewart
- Past members: Gareth Russell; Gavin Fox; Phil Scanlon; Bob Fairfoull

Idlewild are a Scottish indie rock band formed in Edinburgh in 1995. The band's line-up consists of Roddy Woomble (lead vocals), Rod Jones (guitar, backing vocals), Colin Newton (drums), Andrew Mitchell (bass) and Luciano Rossi (keyboards). During live performances, the band are joined by former core member Allan Stewart (guitar). To date, Idlewild have released ten studio albums.

Initially, Idlewild's sound was faster and more dissonant than many of their 1990s indie rock contemporaries. However, it developed over time from an edgy and angular sound (as heard in their early material—once described by the NME as "the sound of a flight of stairs falling down a flight of stairs") to a sweeping, melodic rock sound as displayed on The Remote Part and Warnings/Promises.

In 2010, the band entered an indefinite hiatus, but reunited in late 2013 to record their seventh album, Everything Ever Written, released in 2015. This was followed by Interview Music in 2019. The band released their tenth and latest studio album, Idlewild, on October 3, 2025 to critical acclaim. It became the band's highest charting album in over twenty years, reaching number sixteen on the UK Albums Chart.

== History ==
=== Beginnings (1995–1996) ===
Idlewild, named after the quiet meeting place from the 1908 novel Anne of Green Gables, formed in December 1995 in Edinburgh, Scotland when a 19-year-old Roddy Woomble met drummer Colin Newton at a party. The two discovered that they had much in common, including similar musical interests and record collections. By the end of the night, they had discussed forming a band together. On the same night, the two were introduced to guitarist Rod Jones and the three kept in contact afterwards, meeting up to listen to music. Soon, the trio began writing songs together, and, in need of a bassist, they brought Phil Scanlon into the fold, due to the fact that he owned a bass.

Idlewild played their first show on 16 January 1996, at the Subway Club in Edinburgh to a crowd of thirty friends, which led to many more shows around Edinburgh throughout the course of the year. In May 1996 the band, now with over twenty songs written, entered Split Level Studios to record. The tape of these recordings earned the band many bookings at various venues around Scotland, including Glasgow. Local publications that heard the tape reviewed it favourably.

Phil Scanlon decided to leave the band in February 1997 to concentrate on his studies. Since leaving Idlewild, he has become a highly successful chemical engineer and currently resides outside San Francisco. Woomble asked Bob Fairfoull to replace the departing bassist. Fairfoull had been present at every Idlewild show since the middle of 1996, and had impressed the others with his spoken-word, solo acoustic shows as well as his performances with Edinburgh band, Pussy Hoover. Fairfoull's debut with the band took place on 28 February at Glasgow bar, Nice N' Sleazy's.

=== Captain and Hope is Important (1997–1998) ===
The band's debut single "Queen of the Troubled Teens" was released on 17 March 1997, and built upon the chaotic reputation of their shows. Along with "Self Healer", "Satan Polaroid" and "A Film for the Future", the song was included in a live session on Jeff Cooper's show "XS" (now Radio2XS) on Sheffield's Hallam FM. It was also supported by BBC Radio Scotland DJ Peter Easton, and influential Radio 1 DJ Steve Lamacq. Lamacq was particularly impressed with the track "Self Healer" and asked, on the air, that if anyone knew anything about the band, they should contact him. In the summer of 1997, Idlewild played their first London shows which were attended by the likes of Lamacq, and representatives from Deceptive Records. Reviews at this time, in the pages of NME and Melody Maker compared their live gigs to "a flight of stairs falling down a flight of stairs". The band were soon asked to record a single for Fierce Panda Records and to record an EP/mini-album with Deceptive. In October 1997, the band spent six days with producer Paul Tipler in South London. The result was Captain, which the band describes as "an innocent, frank nugget of noise pop magic". After the release of the "Chandelier" single, the band signed a deal with Food Records/EMI in December. Following the record deal, the members quit their respective jobs or university courses.

1998 marked the year where the public became actively aware of Idlewild, who kicked off the year with their first UK tour, supporting the band Midget. The release of Captain, on 18 January, received positive reviews in the NME, Melody Maker and Kerrang!. In February the band re-entered the studio, again with Tipler, to record their first full-length album for Food. Two singles were released before the album's release, A Film for the Future (compared to Nirvana's "Smells Like Teen Spirit" by one journalist) and "Everyone Says You're So Fragile". Both singles helped to expand the band's growing fanbase alongside notable appearances at summer festivals. October marked the arrival of their debut album Hope Is Important which the band now describes as "a confused, skewered, noisy, sad pop record". Further singles from the album included, "I'm a Message" and fan favourite, "When I Argue I See Shapes". Tours supporting Ash, Placebo and Manic Street Preachers followed the release.

=== 100 Broken Windows (1999–2001) ===
Idlewild eventually returned to Edinburgh in 1999 to begin writing new songs, and contacted engineer Bob Weston, from Chicago, who recorded six songs with them in London. These songs held a more aggressive, emptier sound than those previously, and the band were pleased with the results; however, they remained unsure of their direction. During the summer, Idlewild were invited to play at the opening of the Scottish Parliament in Edinburgh, a momentous day for Scottish history. Scotland is where the band would remain for a while, letting the surrounding environment influence their songwriting and letting the songs represent the band as they were. Hitting a stride, the band returned to the studio with producer Dave Eringa and recorded "Little Discourage" and "Roseability" in their first session. Very happy with the results, the band continued to record what would become their second full-length album, 100 Broken Windows. Little Discourage was released in September and brought Idlewild a larger fan-base and much more radio play. Hope Is Important was released in America, and to support it, the band performed a small number of tour dates on the East Coast. The remainder of the year was spent mixing the new album in Glasgow.

In March the following year, the band released "Actually it's Darkness" and embarked on their biggest UK tour to date. Jeremy Mills joined the band on tour, playing guitar and keyboards. Their sound had now evolved from simplistic punk rock to a more mature sound resembling R.E.M., Echo & the Bunnymen and The Smiths. 100 Broken Windows reached silver status in the UK and the band went on tour in Europe and North America. Further singles released from the album included "These Wooden Ideas" and "Roseability".

As 2001 began, the band re-entered the studio, this time with producer Stephen Street, to record songs written in the last half of 2000. While happy with the results the band put their next album aside to tour America. American music magazine Spin named 100 Broken Windows the "number one album you didn't hear in 2000" and the album received other rave reviews in the American press on its release in April. Whilst touring the album in America, Allan Stewart replaced Jeremy Mills as touring guitarist. Readers of The Skinny magazine in Scotland would retrospectively vote 100 Broken Windows "The Scottish Album of the Decade" in December 2009.

=== The Remote Part (2002–2003) ===
Idlewild eventually moved up to the highlands of Scotland and began the writing and demoing process of what would become The Remote Part. Both Allan and Jeremy joined the band in a cottage in Inchnadamph, Sutherland. Woomble began a friendship with Scottish Makar (poet laureate) Edwin Morgan who would eventually end up on the song "Scottish Fiction," the album's closing track. The remainder of the year was spent recording and mixing the album in various locations with producer Dave Eringa. This period marked the band's longest absence from performing.

The first single from the album, "You Held the World in Your Arms", became "A-listed" on Radio One and entered the UK Singles Chart at number nine, marking the band's biggest hit to date. A UK tour followed with Ikara Colt supporting and a second single, "American English", was released. On release, The Remote Part entered the album charts at number three, and was considered a record of considerable depth, as well as one of the most melodic records of the year. The album went gold in the UK and a third single, "Live in a Hiding Place", was released as the band embarked upon a four-month European tour in September, which included supporting dates with Coldplay.

On 30 September 2002, Idlewild took to the stage in Cologne with their guitar tech Alex Grant playing bass instead of Bob Fairfoull, with Woomble commenting during the show that Fairfoull had left the band. On 3 October, Idlewild officially announced the departure of Fairfoull due to “personal problems”. Fairfoull had become increasingly distant from the band over the past year, often being absent during the recording of The Remote Part, and his drinking habits were having a negative impact on his playing. Things came to a head with Fairfoull in an argument after a show in Amsterdam, with Woomble later commenting that dismissing Fairfoull “was the best thing that could have happened to the band,” and that “it meant we all finally agreed on how we were going to move forward.” The band and Fairfoull remained friends, with Fairfoull going on to play bass with Edinburgh-based band Degrassi and Paper Beats Rock.

In the immediate aftermath of Fairfoull's departure, Idlewild fulfilled their tour dates for the rest of the year with Grant on bass. On 20 November, Idlewild unveiled Gavin Fox of the Irish band Turn as their new bassist, with touring guitarist Allan Stewart also becoming a permanent member of the band. Fairfoull approved of being replaced as Idlewild bassist by his good friend Fox, though he also added, "It felt a bit like if you left your wife, and a week later she started shagging your brother. But I realised there’s no point being bitter, they’ve got to continue as a band."

2002 was Idlewild's most successful year, with The Remote Part entering many "Best of the Year" lists. With Fox and Stewart officially in the band, Idlewild spent January of the following year writing songs and practising in an old lighthouse outside Edinburgh. A final single from The Remote Part, "A Modern Way of Letting Go", introduced the new line-up to the UK via several television appearances and another short tour of Britain and Ireland.

The Remote Part received its US release in March 2003 and the band embarked upon a cross-continent, nine-week headline tour playing their biggest US shows in New York City and Los Angeles. The band then returned to America in May at the request of Pearl Jam, who asked the band to open one leg of their Riot Act world tour. These were the biggest venues Idlewild had played in, and they found friends in Pearl Jam, even playing with them onstage on the final night in Chicago. Subsequently, in June 2007 Pearl Jam requested Idlewild to support them for a one-off date at Wembley Arena.

=== Warnings/Promises (2004–2005) ===
As 2004 began, Idlewild spent the first four months of the year writing and demoing new songs up in the Scottish Highlands, and in Woomble's flat in London. The band chose to work with American producer Tony Hoffer and flew out to Los Angeles and spent the next three months recording and mixing the new songs. This marked the first time Idlewild had recorded an album all in one go.

The band finished up the record in October 2004 in New York with mixer Michael Brauer. Roddy rented a room on the Lower East Side and stayed there for the remainder of the year, listening to the album they had just made. 2004 became the first in the band's existence devoted almost entirely to writing and recording an album. At the end of this year they titled it Warnings/Promises.

2005 began with a series of acoustic shows around the UK. The first single from Warnings/Promises, entitled "Love Steals Us from Loneliness", appeared in February and became Idlewild's fourth Top 20 single. The album followed two weeks later and debuted within the UK Top Ten. Warnings/Promises received mainly positive reviews; however, some critics and fans disliked the band's direction with this album.

In the UK, the band embarked upon an extensive UK tour, changing the setlist every night and revisiting songs from each of their albums. In the summer, Idlewild played a number of festivals and opened shows for U2, R.E.M. and the Pixies. Idlewild Release I Understand It on Date: April 29, 2005.

In November, the band announced that they had parted ways with their record company Parlophone after fulfilling their contractual obligation over eight years, leaving them without a record deal. However, despite rumours that they were breaking up, the band claimed that they were looking forward to the future.

The year ended with a Christmas show at Barrowlands, a famed Glasgow venue and the band's "spiritual home". After this gig, Gavin Fox left the band, with Woomble citing Fox's reluctance to be in a touring rock band and eagerness to stay home in Ireland where he would write songs and sing for his own band, Curse of Cain. Fox was replaced by former Astrid bassist Gareth Russell.

=== Make Another World (2006–2007) ===
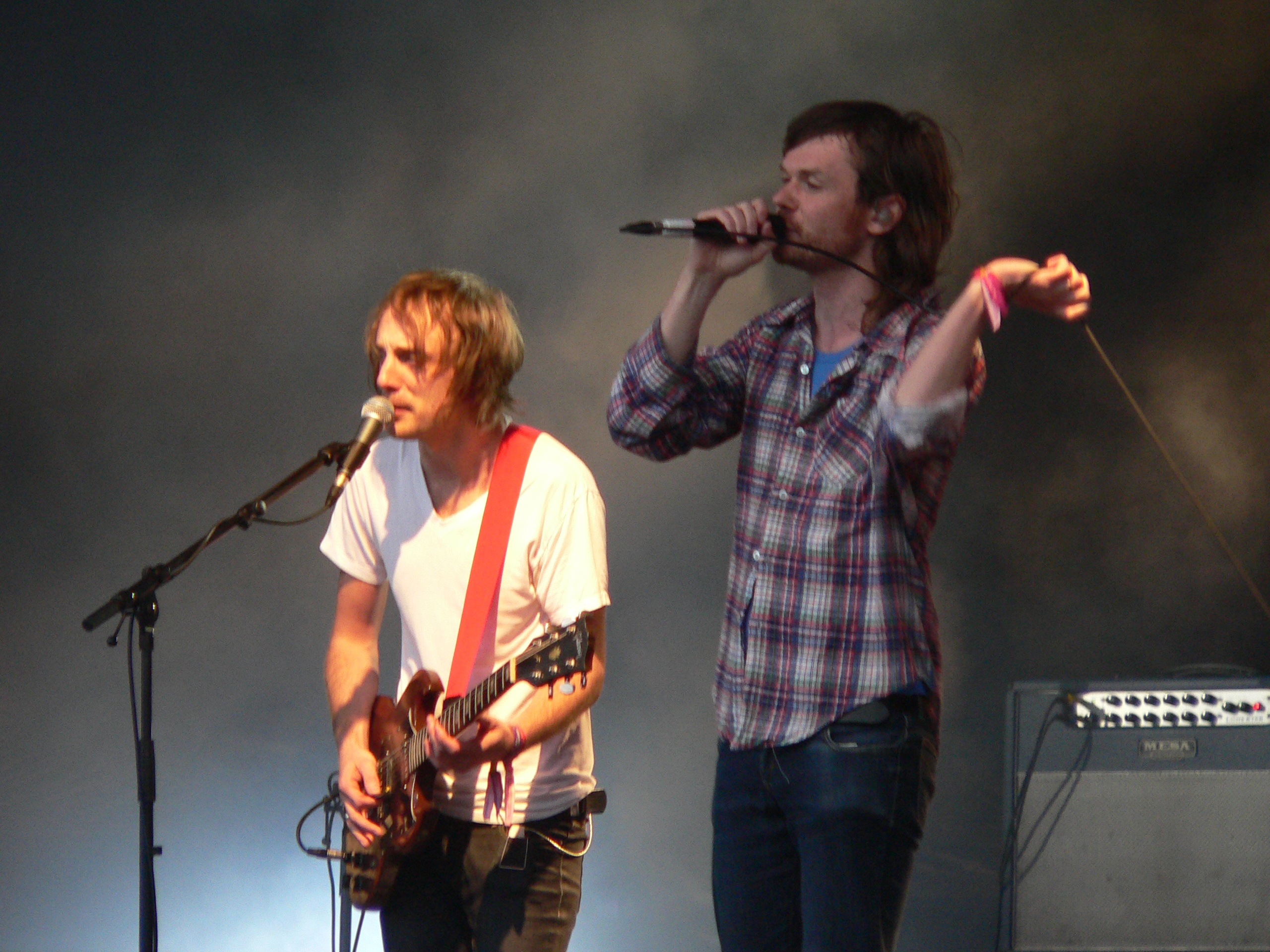
Idlewild performing at The Outsider festival in Aviemore, 23 June 2007

In July 2006, Woomble released an album of folk music under his own name titled My Secret is My Silence. Woomble's solo material was written alongside Jones, friend Michael Angus and folksinger Karine Polwart, and produced by folk musician John McCusker. Roddy toured the album in July and August. Jones meanwhile worked on an album with Inara George called George Is Jones.

The band spent many months writing new material, which was recorded with 100 Broken Windows and The Remote Part producer Eringa in their rehearsal room. The album Make Another World was released on 5 March 2007 by 1960s label Sequel, which was reactivated by music group Sanctuary. "If It Takes You Home" was the first single released from it and was available as a download and 7" single. "No Emotion" was the second single released; it went to No. 36 in the UK Top 40 chart. "A Ghost in the Arcade" was the next single, released on 18 June, though only as an internet-downloadable track and not available on physical CD.

The 19 March 2007 Aberdeen concert on the Make Another World UK Tour was filmed for a live DVD release. This was released in October 2007 as part of a special edition of a greatest hits album, Scottish Fiction - Best of 1997-2007, on former label Parlophone. A second, download-only, compilation album was also the same month. A Distant History - Rarities 1997-2007 included the band's early singles as well as many B-sides.

=== Post Electric Blues and hiatus (2008–2010) ===
The band continued to play more gigs while working on their next album. Meanwhile, Woomble started writing a column for Scottish newspaper The Sunday Herald and released an album with Kris Drever and John McCusker, entitled Before the Ruin, in September 2008.

In December 2008 the band played five shows at King Tut's Wah Wah Hut, playing each of their studio albums in full. Woomble noted that the band were "going to try to play every track [they had] ever written – including B-sides – which has to be more than 100 songs." In February 2009, they announced that they would be staging a similar residency at Dingwalls in Camden, London.

A new song, "City Hall", appeared in a setlist, and the band entered the studio in January 2009. On his online diary, Woomble noted that he had: "been trying to work on lyrics for the new Idlewild record. At the moment it has the possibility of being about anything, so I've been trying to narrow that down a bit. I've been re-reading Jack Kerouac's novels and following this US election, and keeping up with all the new US groups, so maybe it'll take on a Stars and stripes theme. It'll probably end up being about mountains and Islands though."

On 21 November the band sent an email to fans on the mailing list offering them a chance to pre-order the new album (along with "exclusive packaging & including at least one bonus track") to be "shipped within weeks of completion". All fans who bought the album this way would also have their name appear in the CD booklet and on a roll call on the band's official website. On 9 May 2009, Roddy confirmed in his online diary that the new album would be entitled Post Electric Blues. The album was performed in full on 19 May.

Initial emails indicated a release date to fans who had pre-ordered the album of mid-April, but the album was eventually mailed out on 10 June 2009. Fans who pre-ordered the album were also allowed to download their choice of live tracks that the band had recorded at the King Tut's series of shows. The album was officially released in October, preceded by the single "Readers & Writers". In April 2010, Woomble announced that the band would enter a hiatus following the band's tour in support of Post Electric Blues. However this comment only referred to the writing and recording of new material as Woomble later suggested. Idlewild announced their first American tour since 2005 and a short UK tour in support of the EMI re-release of 100 Broken Windows. During the UK shows (as well as a New York and Los Angeles show) the album was to be played in its entirety. However, due to an injury to Jones, the American dates were cancelled. The 100 Broken Windows reissue was released on 8 November 2010 and featured a second disc of B-sides and unreleased material.

=== Renewed activity (2013–present) ===
An end to the band's hiatus was made public in September 2013, by which point Russell and Stewart had left to be replaced by multi-instrumentalist Luciano Rossi. The band started recording a new album in January 2014. Seventh studio album, Everything Ever Written, was released in February 2015. In addition to Woomble, Jones and Newton, the album also included contributions from new members Rossi and bassist Andrew Mitchell of The Hazey Janes.

Idlewild marked the 15th anniversary of The Remote Part by playing the album in full at two Christmas 2017 shows at the ABC in Glasgow, which sold out within a day, and Koko in London. The second Glasgow show was notable for surprise guest appearances by former Idlewild members Stewart and Fairfoull. The band then spent 2018 working on a new album, and playing another The Remote Part anniversary show in Edinburgh with Fairfoull once again appearing as a special guest. The resultant album, Interview Music, was released on 5 April 2019, and Allan Stewart rejoined on second guitar for the live shows.

In March 2020, Idlewild announced a November tour of UK and Ireland to mark the band's 25th anniversary but due to the COVID-19 pandemic the dates were rescheduled for November 2021. In February 2021 a retrospective book written by Woomble, In the Beginning There Were Answers: 25 Years of Idlewild, was published.

On October 3, 2025, the band released its tenth studio album, Idlewild, on V2 Records. Produced by Jones and the band itself, the album was released to positive reviews and became the band's highest charting album in over twenty years, reaching number sixteen on the UK Albums Chart and number three on the Scottish Albums Chart.

== Solo work ==
Jones released his debut solo album, A Sentimental Education, in 2009. In 2010, Jones founded The Fruit Tree Foundation, alongside Emma Pollock of The Delgados, in order to raise awareness of mental health problems. Jones released his second solo album, A Generation Innocence, in August 2012; however, while writing for the second album, Jones encountered a hurdle at the halfway mark, as he discovered that he was not satisfied with any of the material that he had written thus far. In 2011, Jones explained, "I was a bit fed up with the whole folk music thing – I mean every man and his dog was doing the faux folk thing"—Jones then proceeded to learn the drums and eventually formed the band, The Birthday Suit, to record the material that he had created in the period following the drumming diversion.

In late 2011, Jones formed The Birthday Suit and described the band as "essentially a solo project ... It's an ever-changing bistro of musicians." The band released its debut album, The Eleventh Hour, in October 2011. The Birthday Suit's second studio album, A Conversation Well Rehearsed was released on 3 December 2012. The album was listed in 19th place in the Clean Slate Music website's "Top 21 Albums of 2012" list, although the website wrote that the second album "doesn't carry the punch" of the band's debut album.

In 2006, Woomble worked with several musicians including Kate Rusby, his wife Ailidh Lennon, songwriter Karine Polwart (to whom he presented the Horizon Award at the BBC Folk Awards 2005, and with whom he performed at Celtic Connections) and Jones on his debut solo album My Secret is My Silence, produced by McCusker. The album was released in July 2006, and Woomble toured the United Kingdom in support of the album's release. My Secret is my Silence reached number one in the UK Folk Charts, and a year later, on 10 July 2007, My Secret is my Silence was released in the United States on 7–10 Music. Woomble's follow-up album, Before the Ruin, written and recorded with Drever and McCusker, was released on 15 September 2008 through Navigator Records. In March 2011, Woomble released his second solo album, The Impossible Song & Other Songs. In 2023 Roddy Woomble launched a new project called Almost Nothing.

== Members ==
Current members

- Roddy Woomble – lead vocals (1995–2010, 2013–present)
- Rod Jones – guitar, backing vocals (1995–2010, 2013–present), keyboards (1995–2010)
- Colin Newton – drums (1995–2010, 2013–present)
- Andrew Mitchell – bass, backing vocals (2014–present), guitar (2014–2019, 2022)
- Luciano "Lucci" Rossi – keyboards, backing vocals (2014–present)

Current touring musicians

- Allan Stewart – guitar (core member 2003–2010; touring musician 2001–2002, 2019–present)

Former members

- Phil Scanlon – bass (1995–1997)
- Bob Fairfoull – bass (1997–2002)
- Gavin Fox – bass (2003–2005; touring member 2022)
- Gareth Russell – bass (2006–2010)

Former touring musicians

- Jeremy Mills – guitar (1999–2001)
- Alex Grant – bass (2002)
- Hannah Fisher – fiddle, backing vocals (2013–2024)
- Murray Macleod – guitar (October 2025; substitute for Allan Stewart, July–August 2026; one-off shows)

== Discography ==
Studio albums

- Captain (1998)
- Hope Is Important (1998)
- 100 Broken Windows (2000)
- The Remote Part (2002)
- Warnings/Promises (2005)
- Make Another World (2007)
- Post Electric Blues (2009)
- Everything Ever Written (2015)
- Interview Music (2019)
- Idlewild (2025)

== See also ==
- Scottish music (2000–2010)
- Edinburgh culture
- Scottish literature
- Music of Scotland
