= Post Electric Blues =

Studio album by Idlewild
- Released: 11 June 2009
- Recorded: February–March 2009
- Studio: Bryn Derwyn, Bethesda, Wales; Chem 19, Glasgow, Scotland
- Genre: Indie rock
- Length: 40:45
- Label: Self-released, Cooking Vinyl
- Producer: Dave Eringa

Idlewild chronology
Make Another World (2007)	Post Electric Blues (2009)	Everything Ever Written (2015)

Professional ratings
Aggregate scores
Source	Rating
Metacritic	72/100
Review scores
Source	Rating
AllMusic	3.5/5 stars
Drowned in Sound	(7/10)
God is in the TV	4.5/5 stars
The Music Magazine	(favourable)
PopMatters	7/10 stars
The Skinny	4/5 stars

Post Electric Blues is the seventh studio album by Scottish indie rock band Idlewild, self-released to around 3000 fans in June 2009. The album was subsequently released on 5 October 2009 on Cooking Vinyl. Prior to recording, guitarist Rod Jones revealed that the album has "quite an upbeat musical feel," and that it sounds "like a band having a good time."

Upon the album's traditional release, Jones stated: "I think the way we approached making this record, and doing things ourselves and involving our fans just gave us the freedom and time to do what we wanted to do without any pressure. I think it has been a turning point for us."

The album peaked at No. 90 in the UK Album Charts in its first week of physical release. It might have charted higher but the band sold a number of pre-order copies via their website, which is not a registered chart company.

The album's first single, "Readers & Writers" was released digitally on 28 September.

The album was performed in full on 19 May 2009 at Dingwalls, in London.

== Background and recording ==
Following the release of Make Another World, Idlewild's label, Sanctuary Records, went into administration, leaving the band without a recording contract. Idlewild subsequently decided to release their next studio album directly to their fanbase. In November 2008, the band launched a new website, www.idlewildmusic.com, with the following message:

After 11 years of recording and releasing records within the constraints of the record industry we now feel that the time is right and the technology exists for us to deal more quickly and directly with the fans. It also allows us total control of our music and will ultimately mean that should you choose to get involved you will hear our music as soon as it is available. Although the album will have a more traditional release some time later in 2009 we hope you will support us in our efforts to try something new and choose to pre-order the album now.

Those that pre-ordered the album received fifteen exclusive live tracks from the band's recent King Tut's residency, blog entries from band members and exclusive video footage from the recording process.

In early January 2009, the band entered pre-production with frequent producer Dave Eringa at their rehearsal space in Rosyth, Fife. In February and March 2009, the band recorded at Bryn Derwyn in Bethesda, Wales, and then moved to Chem19 in Glasgow, Scotland. Eringa served as the producer and engineer during the sessions. He later mixed the recordings at Beethoven Street Studios in London in March 2009, with mix engineer Tom Loffman; the album was then mastered by Ed Woods. At this time, Jones began recording his debut solo album, A Sentimental Education using Eringa's equipment.

== Composition and lyrics ==
According to vocalist Roddy Woomble, the first track written for Post Electric Blues was album opener "Younger Than America". Influenced by Westerns and Neil Young & Crazy Horse, Woomble states that:

"after [we had] written the song, I thought the record might turn into an American sounding piece of classic rock, but it didn't turn out that way really, especially after writing "Readers and Writers". The record went in whatever direction it chose to."

Regarding the album's lyrical content, Woomble states that he wanted "to have a more off-the-cuff feel to the record".

== Release ==
The album was subsequently posted to fans in June 2009, and released on 5 October 2009 on Cooking Vinyl records.

== Artwork ==
The album's artwork features band photographs taken by photographer David Gillanders. The photographs were taken in January 2009 at the band's rehearsal studio in Rosyth. Regarding the album's artwork, vocalist Roddy Woomble states that:

In the past we've favored black and white, and sepia styles, but I've been looking a lot of old Jazz LP covers from the early 70s and I love the look of them. So it's going to be colorful. The Glaswegian photographer David Gillanders came to the practice space last week and spent the afternoon taking pictures while we played. [...] David's photographs are always great. He's done some really important documentary work in far off places, including Malawi, Madagascar and Ukraine. His photo study of Knife crime in Glasgow is particularly harrowing.

== Leak ==
A note was included with the pre-order album package thanking fans for their patience and asking them not to upload the album on to the internet. However, this note was ignored and it has been freely available on the internet since mid-June 2009.

== Track listing ==
All songs written by Idlewild.

1. "Younger Than America" – 3:57
2. "Readers & Writers" – 2:50
3. "City Hall" – 3:21
4. "(The Night Will) Bring You Back to Life" – 3:24
5. "Dreams of Nothing" – 3:08
6. "Take Me Back to the Islands" – 4:58
7. "Post-Electric" – 5:08
8. "All Over the Town" – 2:07
9. "To Be Forgotten" – 3:23
10. "Circles in Stars" – 3:47
11. "Take Me Back in Time" – 4:38

=== B-sides ===
- "No Wiser" – 3:26 (pre-order bonus track)
- "Take Away the Night Time" (standard release bonus track)
- "Take Me Back in Time" (demo) (standard release bonus track)
- "(The Night Will) Bring You Back to Life" (demo) ("Readers & Writers" b-side)
- "Again (Let the Buildings Burn Bright)" (City Hall single)

== Personnel ==
Personnel per booklet.

Idlewild

- Rod Jones – guitar, keyboards, vocals
- Colin Newton – drums, percussion
- Gareth Russell – bass guitar
- Allan Stewart – guitars, vocals
- Roddy Woomble – lead vocals

Additional musicians

- John Blackshaw – trumpet (track 3)
- Dave Eringa – Hammond organ (tracks 1, 2 and 6)
- John McCusker – violin (tracks 1 and 6)
- Heidi Talbot – vocals (tracks 1 and 6)

Production and design

- Dave Eringa – producer, engineer, mixing
- Tom Loffman – mix engineer
- Ed Woods – mastering
- David Gillanders – photography
- Monkeywithapen – design
