= 100 Broken Windows =

Studio album by Idlewild
- Released: 10 April 2000
- Recorded: May – November 1999
- Studio: AIR, London; Jacob's, Surrey; Rockfield, Wales; Electrical Audio, Chicago
- Genre: Indie punk
- Length: 38:46
- Label: Food
- Producer: Dave Eringa

Idlewild chronology
Hope Is Important (1998)	100 Broken Windows (2000)	The Remote Part (2002)

Singles from 100 Broken Windows
- 1. "Little Discourage" Released: 20 September 1999; 2. "Actually It's Darkness" Released: 27 March 2000; 3. "These Wooden Ideas" Released: 12 June 2000; 4. "Roseability" Released: 16 October 2000

100 Broken Windows is the second studio album by Scottish rock band Idlewild, released on 9 May 2000. While touring in support of their debut studio album Hope Is Important (1998), the band wrote and recorded its follow-up in stages. Sessions were done between May and November 1999 at a variety of studios: AIR in London, Jacob's in Surrey, Rockfield in Wales, and Electrical Audio, Chicago. Initial recording with Bob Weston resulted in unremarkable material, by which point they switched to working with producer Dave Eringa. Described as an indie punk album, 100 Broken Windows has been compared to R.E.M. and Hüsker Dü.

A tour of the United Kingdom preceded the release of the album's lead single "Little Discourage" on 20 September 1999. Idlewild closed the year with a tour of the United States; in March and April 2000, they went on a stint of the UK. "Actually It's Darkness" was released as a single on 27 March 2000 during the latter trek. They toured Europe with Muse prior to the release of the "These Wooden Ideas" single on 12 June 2000. Various festival appearances followed, till later in the year when the band went on a tour of the UK. "Roseability" was released as a single on 16 October 2000, which was promoted with a few supporting shows for Placebo.

100 Broken Windows received generally favourable reviews from music critics, some of whom praised the songwriting and progress from their previous album. The album charted at number six in Scotland, and number 15 in the UK. It would later be certified gold in the UK. All of the songs appeared on the Scottish and UK Singles Charts, with "Little Discourage" charting the highest in Scotland at number 12, and "Actually It's Darkness" charting the highest in the UK at number 23. 100 Broken Windows appeared on an overlooked albums from the year list by Spin, and was ranked number one on a Scottish albums of the decade list by The Skinny.

== Background and production ==
Idlewild released their debut studio album Hope Is Important in October 1998. It peaked at number 53 in the UK, while all of its four singles appeared on the UK Singles Chart, with "When I Argue I See Shapes" reaching the highest at number 24. The band wrote and recorded their next album in sections during their 120-date promotional tour for Hope Is Important. While writing the album, lead singer Roddy Woomble revisited Scottish folk music that he had grown up listening to prior to discarding it for nosier forms of music, as well as American rock. Between May and November 1999, recording sessions were held at AIR Studios in London, Jacob's Studio in Surrey, Rockfield Studios in Wales, and Electrical Audio in Chicago, Illinois.

Woomble had been enamored with bands such as June of 44 and Slint; Idlewild contacted Bob Weston and sent him some demos. Weston, who liked the demos, went to London to work with the band. Woomble said they had worked on a few tracks, "but they were just so weird, and we weren't ready for that". The band wanted direction, which they felt they were unable to due to Weston taking more of an engineer role instead of a producer. As their label Food Records disliked those songs, the band set about working with Dave Eringa, who had finished working with the Manic Street Preachers at Rockfield, and travelled to Jacob's to meet Idlewild.

Woomble said they didn't want to be viewed as "just as a rowdy night out for teenagers"; with the creation of "Little Discourage" and "Roseability", the band had a newfound confidence. They visited Weston in Chicago to finish working on some tracks. Eringa revisited the material the band had done during their first session with Weston, and had them re-sing some vocal sections. Weston recorded "Listen to What You've Got", "Rusty", and "The Bronze Medal", while Eringa produced the remaining tracks, and did additional recording for "The Bronze Medal". They were assisted by John Bailey, Matt Ollivier, Lee Butler, and Willie Deans. All recordings were by mixed by Eringa at CaVa Studios in Glasgow in December 1999, except for "Rusty", which was mixed by Weston in Chicago.

== Composition and lyrics ==
Musically, the sound of 100 Broken Windows has been described as indie punk, and was compared to 1980s alternative acts, such as R.E.M. and Hüsker Dü. Woomble said the Smiths served as a big influence on the album. The album saw Woomble sing in his own accent, in contrast to the previous releases where he leaned towards a more American vocal. Rich Hughes of The Line of Best Fit said the band got the "mix perfect between their REM-influenced literary rock and their punk past". Ink 19 writer Marcel Feldmar said it "conjures up some of the best moments of Swervedriver, and at other moments you just get lost in the power and passion, pulling in a ferocity like the New Model Army up in arms again". Discussing the title, guitarist Rod Jones said Woomble had written it in a book sometime prior, and that it dealt the album's topical theme of dissatisfaction. Woomble said the lyrics reference subject matter such as postmodernism, the Scottish mountains, crofting, and Gertrude Stein. He said the band were improving as songwriters, "but not so much for the album to lose its raw edges". Jeff Jackson of Sonic said the lyrics bounce between "straightforward declarations and enigmatic wordplay, the songs unfurl their meanings in short bursts and volleys".

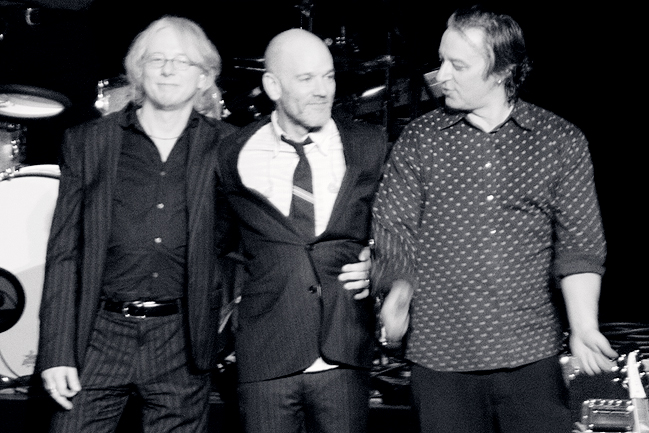
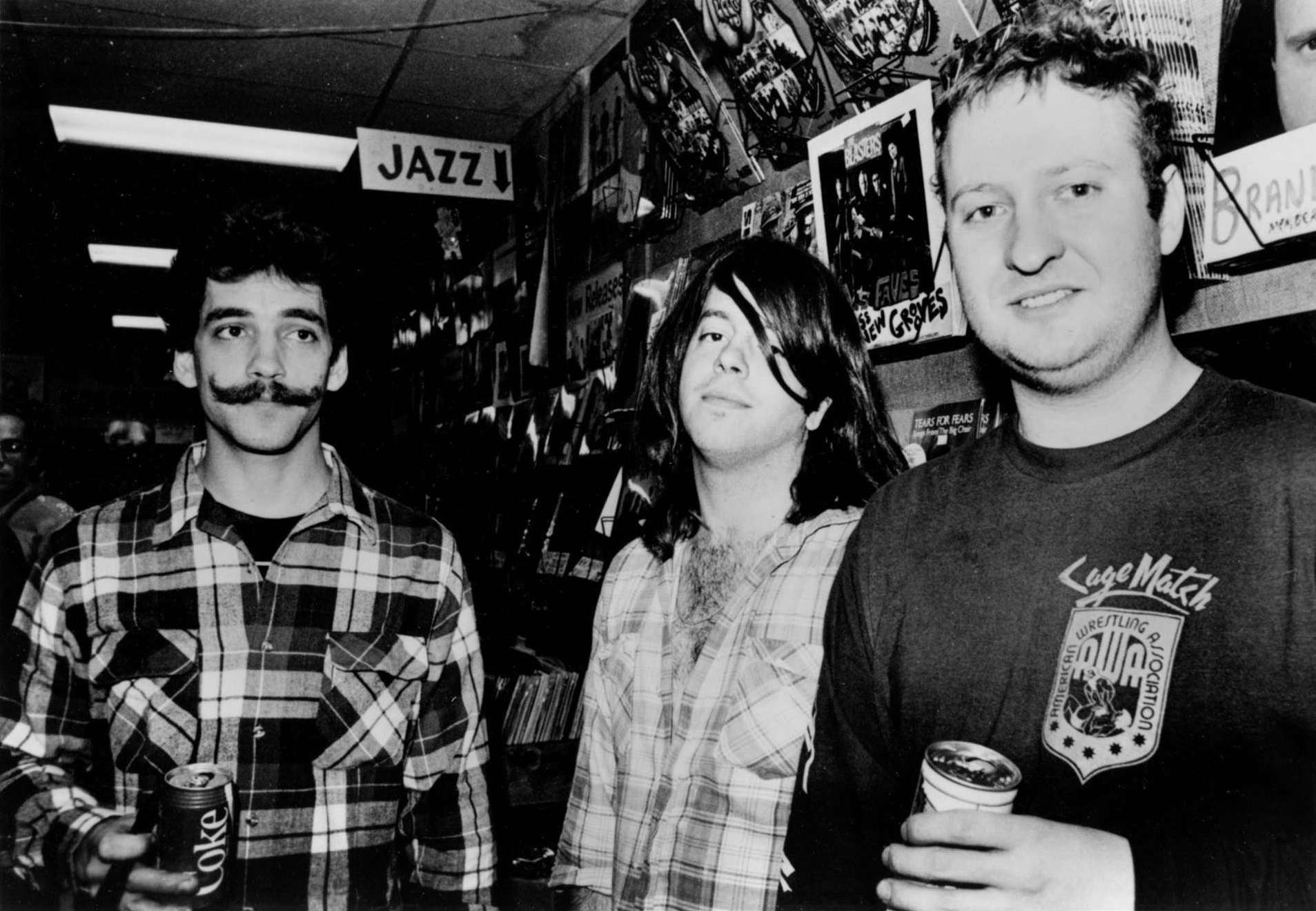
Critics drew comparison between 100 Broken Windows and the work of R.E.M. (top) and Hüsker Dü (bottom).

100 Broken Windows opens with "Little Discourage", a track that beings with a Nirvana-esque guitar part. Its call-and-response chorus section contains touches of new wave keyboards. It was one of the first songs written for the album, and initially sounded closer to "You're the Voice" (1986) by John Farnham. They subsequently changed the song; its lyrics were intentionally vague, spurred on by the opening line, which Woomble had written on its own at the top of his notebook. "These Wooden Ideas" is critical of the music industry, and was compared to Murmur (1983)-era R.E.M. The band borrowed a keyboard and guitar from Teenage Fanclub for the song as they were recording in another room at Rockfield. "Roseability" is an alternative rock track; Woomble said he was inspired by a poem by Gertrude Stein. When working on a song, Woomble wanted to play along to it to come up with potential lyrics, to which Eringa said he'd "give him an idea track".

The song "Idea Track" was subsequently named after this, and deals with optimism. Jones said it was the band's first attempting at writing a track while at a studio. The chorus sections came about as Woomble was unable to settle on a melody that he enjoyed, so Eringa combined all six existing vocal takes into one. The bridge section features a violin performance from Jones, as they had found the instrument while at Jacob's. "Let Me Sleep (Next to the Mirror)" is a mid-tempo song that recalls the early work of the Smashing Pumpkins. "Listen to What You've Got" evoked the work of the Pixies, which Woomble attributed to the American underground rock they liked. As the song was done in Chicago with Weston, Jones was able to use Steve Albini's Travis Bean and IVP guitars to give it "that buzzsaw guitar sound".

"Actually It's Darkness" opens with a post-punk keyboard part, before switching into Oi!-era guitar riff, with a piano-centred bridge section. One of its lines, "shed a shade of shyness" was taken from a live review about Woomble, which he felt "link[ed] together public and personal opinion". "Rusty" featured guitar riffs in the style of Fugazi, which were inspired by Shellac's 1000 Hurts (2000), and also played on the Travis Bean and IVP guitars. During one weekend, Eringa was working as a sound engineer for a Manic Street Preachers show; Idlewild got drunk in the studio, attempting to cover "Save Tonight" (1997) by Eagle-Eye Cherry, and wrote "Mistake Pageant" in the process. The album ends with the ballad "The Bronze Medal", which recalled "All Apologies" (1993) by Nirvana.

== Release ==
In July and August 1999, Idlewild played a handful of shows in mainland Europe and the UK, including an appearance at the Reading and Leeds Festivals. In September 1999, the band embarked on a tour of the UK. Coinciding with this, "Little Discourage" was released as a single on 20 September 1999. Two versions were released on CD: the first with "A Tone" and "Broken Windows", while the second included "1990 Nightime", and a live version of "You Don't Have the Heart". The music video for "Little Discourage" was directed by James and Alex. After this, they went on a headlining tour of the United States throughout the following month. On 13 January 2000, 100 Broken Windows was announced for released in three months' time. In March and April 2000, the band toured across the UK; Jeremy Mills of Peeps into Fairyland served as the band's touring guitarist for the trek.

"Actually It's Darkness" was released as a single on 27 March 2000. Two versions were released on CD: the first with "Meet Me at the Harbour" and "West Haven", while the second featured "Forgot to Follow", and a cover of "It'll Take a Long Time" (1972) by Sandy Denny. The music video for "Actually It's Darkness" was directed by James and Alex. 100 Broken Windows was released on 10 April 2000 by Food Records. The album's booklet includes a black-and-white map of Outer Hebrides. In another part of the booklet, "Subject: History" is mentioned, which Woomble had a double meaning: when people inquired as to the subject matter of their songs; when they worked with Weston, the tapes had a section on the label listed as "Subject", intended for the name of the band, though Weston wrote topics like geography and history.

100 Broken Windows was promoted with an instore performance at the HMV shop in Edinburgh, a one-off gig that was broadcast on Japanese TV, as well as appearances on Later... with Jools Holland and Top of the Pops. They then embarked on a tour of Europe with Muse in May 2000, leading up to the single release of "These Wooden Ideas" on 12 June 2000. Two versions were released on CD: the first with "There's Glory in Your Story" and a cover of "When the Ship Comes In" (1964) by Bob Dylan, while the second included an acoustic version of "Actually It's Darkness", and a cover of "Rescue" (1980) by Echo & the Bunnymen. The music video for "These Wooden Ideas" was directed by James and Alex. The band played a handful of instore performances at Virgin Megastores, prior to appearances at the Glastonbury, T in the Park, Witnness, T on the Fringe and Reading and Leeds Festivals.

In between of these shows, Jones accompanied Graham Coxon on his solo tour of the UK in July 2000. In October 2000, the band went on another tour of the UK, which coincided with the release of single "Roseability" on 16 October 2000. Two versions were released on CD: the first with "Thousand", a remix of "Rusty", and the music video for "Roseability" (directed by Grant Gee), while the second featured a live version of "I've Only Just Begun", and a radio session version of "Self Healer". The concept for the "Roseability" video stemmed from the label asking if they could create a "straightforward video" as the previous ones were not shown till after midnight. As James and Alex were busy, the band settled on Gee, who had previously worked with other acts on Parlophone, such as Coldplay and Radiohead; they invited their fans to appear in the video. Following this, the band supported Placebo for a handful of shows. 100 Broken Windows was released in the US on 13 March 2001 through Capitol and Odeon Records. "Little Discourage" was released to US modern rock radio stations on 11 June 2001.

100 Broken Windows was played in full in December 2008 at King Tut's Wah Wah Hut in Glasgow as part of a series of shows where the band performed all of their albums. It was released as a two-CD package with Hope Is Important in 2002, and then with their third studio album The Remote Part in 2011. A 10th anniversary two-CD version of 100 Broken Windows was released in 2010, with B-sides, demos, and radio session versions. The band performed the album in its entirety again, in 2010 in Edinburgh. "Roseability", "These Wooden Ideas", "Let Me Sleep (Next to the Mirror)", and "Little Discourage" were included on the band's first compilation album, Scottish Fiction: Best of 1997–2007 (2007), alongside the music videos for all of the album's singles. "Roseability", "Actually It's Darkness", "Idea Track", "Little Discourage", and the remix of "Rusty" were included on the band's third compilation album, The Collection (2010).

== Reception ==
Original release
Review scores
Source	Rating
AllMusic	3.5/5 stars
Blender	2/5 stars
Entertainment Weekly	A
The Guardian	2/5 stars
La Opinión	4/5 stars
NME	8/10
Pitchfork	8.3/10
Select	4/5 stars
Spin	9/10
Stylus	A−

=== Original reviews ===
100 Broken Windows was met with generally favorable reviews from music critics. Entertainment Weekly writer Brian M. Raftery said Woomble's voice was "backed by rousing punk guitars and a ceaseless energy. The results are flashes of beauty and menace, often [...] in one song." Octavio Hernandez of La Opinión said it was an "energetic recording", with Woomble's " brilliant voice and a rhythmic skeleton of great flavor". Spin's Jon Dolan wrote that the album was an "astounding follow-up" to Hope Is Important. The staff at NME said melody is "now paramount over velocity, the rough edges of reckless spontaneity smoothed by the high-gloss patina of responsible coherence". They noted that the album "gracefully enacts the sort of awkward, jarring progression another band would take several albums to complete."

Keith Gwillim of Stylus write that the band made music that is "all bluster and belligerence on the surface, but goes much deeper", showcasing that they were capable of "stealing from the past and making it your own". Pitchfork joint reviewers Beatty & Garrett expected a repeat of Hope Is Important and were "completely [...] surprise[d]" as it had "[n]o more screeching. No more punk-guitar chaos. No more uncomfortable strain." They added that the "chord progressions are crisp and the hooks immediate." In The Rolling Stone Album Guide, Chris Ryan wrote that the band "grows up and gets smart", greatly "step[ping] up in song-writing quality, as melody takes precedence over noise". AllMusic reviewer MacKenzie Wilson noted that the band "scale back a bit" on the album, while showing they had "grown up". Chris Lorraine for Blender said that while it was a "melodic, chorus-catchy disc", the band's "need to kick into a loud anthemic chorus on each song feels a bit by-the-book".

=== Retrospective reviews ===
Retrospective reviews
Review scores
Source	Rating
Encyclopedia of Popular Music	5/5 stars
The List	5/5 stars
The Press	4/5 stars
Record Collector	3/5 stars
The Skinny	4/5 stars

The List writer Camilla Pia said the album was "slightly out of step with the modern world and yet meant so much to those who ‘got it'". Record Collector reviewer Jamie Atkins wrote that the album went on to be the band's "finest moment", with several of the tracks displaying a "new maturity to their songwriting without sacrificing the abrasiveness that made their earlier records so exciting". BBC Music's Mike Diver saw the album as a "game-changer" that "stamped Idlewild's identity as a highly literate, immensely able outfit whose melodies had evolved into true earworms". Dan Bean of The Press wrote that the album has "dated little" since its release, with "Little Discourage" "setting the pace and style of the album". The Skinny's PJ Meiklem noted that a few of tracks had "all the melodic clues" that would be expanded upon with their next album The Remote Part. He added that ten years removed from its release, 100 Broken Windows was "still a powerful record".

=== Commercial performance and accolades ===
100 Broken Windows peaked at number six in Scotland, and number 15 in the UK. "Little Discourage" charted at number 12 in Scotland, and number 24 in the UK. "Actually It's Darkness" charted at number 14 in Scotland, and number 23 in the UK. "These Wooden Ideas" charted at number 18 in Scotland, and number 32 in the UK. "Roseability" charted at number 25 in Scotland, and number 38 in the UK. 100 Broken Windows was certified gold by the British Phonographic Industry (BPI). By July 2003, it has sold 35,000 copies in the US.

Spin ranked it at number one on their list of overlooked albums from the year. The Skinny ranked the album as number one on their Scottish Albums of the Decade list. Kerrang! included it on their list of Seven Amazing British Rock Albums From A Golden Era between 1999 and 2002. Fatherson have cited it as an influence on their third album Sum of All Your Parts (2018), while Mastersystem have cited it and Hope Is Important as influences on their debut album Dance Music (2018).

== Track listing ==
All songs by Idlewild.

1. "Little Discourage" – 3:08
2. "I Don't Have the Map" – 2:14
3. "These Wooden Ideas" – 3:52
4. "Roseability" – 3:38
5. "Idea Track" – 3:13
6. "Let Me Sleep (Next to the Mirror)" – 3:20
7. "Listen to What You've Got" – 2:32
8. "Actually It's Darkness" – 2:39
9. "Rusty" – 4:17
10. "Mistake Pageant" – 2:49
11. "Quiet Crown" – 3:21
12. "The Bronze Medal" – 3:35

== Personnel ==
Personnel per booklet.

Idlewild

- Bob Fairfoull – bass
- Rod Jones – guitar
- Colin Newton – drums
- Roddy Woomble – vocals

Production and design

- Bob Weston – recording (tracks 7, 9 and 12), mixing (track 9)
- Dave Eringa – producer, mixing (all except track 9), additional recording (track 12)
- John Bailey – studio assistant
- Matt Ollivier – studio assistant
- Lee Butler – studio assistant
- Willie Deans – studio assistant
- Ian Ritterskamp – cover photograph
- Chika – band photography
- Anonymous – design

== Charts and certifications ==
=== Weekly charts ===
Chart performance for 100 Broken Windows
Chart (2000)	Peak position
Scottish Albums (OCC)	6
UK Albums (OCC)	15

=== Certifications ===
Certifications for 100 Broken Windows
Region	Certification	Certified units/sales
United Kingdom (BPI)	Gold	100,000^{^}
^{^} Shipments figures based on certification alone.
