= The Remote Part =

Studio album by Idlewild
- Released: 15 July 2002
- Recorded: January–February 2001; September–December 2001
- Studios: Linford Manor, Milton Keynes; Rockfield, Wales; Sawmills, Cornwall; RAK, London
- Genres: Alternative rock; indie rock
- Length: 38:14
- Label: Parlophone
- Producers: Dave Eringa; Stephen Street; Guy Massey

Idlewild chronology
100 Broken Windows (2000)	The Remote Part (2002)	Warnings/Promises (2005)

Singles from The Remote Part
- 1. "You Held the World in Your Arms" Released: 15 April 2002; 2. "American English" Released: 1 July 2002; 3. "Live in a Hiding Place" Released: 21 October 2002; 4. "A Modern Way of Letting Go" Released: 10 February 2003

The Remote Part is the third studio album by Scottish rock band Idlewild, released on 15 July 2002 by Parlophone. As they were becoming increasingly aware of their label's interest in them and their demos, the band's musical direction was being steered by guitarist Rod Jones. For the first half of 2001, the band recorded songs with producers Stephen Street and Lenny Kaye. Due to the uneven nature of the songs done between tours, they spent some time reworking 20 tracks in the Scottish Highlands. They recorded at Rockfield Studios in Wales, RAK Studios in London, and Sawmills Studios in Cornwall with producer Dave Eringa. Described as an alternative rock and indie rock record, it lacked the punk rock elements of their previous work.

Bookending two UK tours, "You Held the World in Your Arms" was released as the album's lead single on 15 April 2002. The second and third singles "American English" and "Live in a Hiding Place" were released on 1 July and 21 October 2002, respectively. During a stint of Europe, bassist Bob Fairfoull left the band, and was temporarily replaced by technician Alex Grant. They then supported Coldplay on their tours of the UK and Europe. In November 2002, Gavin Fox of Turn and touring guitarist Allan Stewart joined as official members. Two further tours of the UK followed in late 2002 and early 2003; they then went on a headlining US tour, before supporting Pearl Jam in that territory for two months.

The Remote Part received universal acclaim from music critics, some of whom praised the band's energy and songwriting. The album peaked at number two in Scotland, and number three in the UK, as well as charting in France and Ireland. It would later be certified gold in the UK. All of the songs appeared within the top 30 of the Scottish and UK Singles Charts, with "You Held the World in Your Arms" charting the highest at number four in the former, and number nine in the latter.

== Background and writing ==
Idlewild released their second studio album 100 Broken Windows in April 2000, which was produced by Dave Eringa. It peaked at number 15 in the UK, while all of its four singles appeared on the UK Singles Chart, with "Actually It's Darkness" reaching the highest at number 23. With the making of the album, the band became aware of how invested their record label was with the band, and their feedback in regards to demos. Frontman Roddy Woomble acknowledged that the band had been working towards anthemic tracks, and was confident they would pull them off.

They promoted 100 Broken Windows with a UK tour, a supporting slot for Muse on their headlining European tour, and appearances at the Glastonbury, T in the Park and Witnness festivals. Woomble noted that the band felt like "a collective of songwriters" during the writing process for the next album. He credits guitarist Rod Jones with influencing their musical direction, stating that Jones "really started to take steps forward in terms of his guitar playing, and also his harmonies". In August 2000, the band debuted three songs during a hometown show, all three of which leaned towards a 1980s sound; further material was aired during a UK tour.

== Production ==
In January and February 2001, Idlewild had recorded seven songs with producer Stephen Street at Linford Manor in Milton Keynes, prior to a tour of the United States in March and April 2001. They then supported Placebo on their US tour in April and May 2001. Idlewild were unhappy with the material with they did with Street and decided to start again; Woomble said Parlophone were not satisfied with the power metal/ambient direction of the new songs noting "one of them was a 23 minute recording of a man crying, we thought it was great but the label didnae". They spent a day with producer Lenny Kaye, who Woomble found to be very enthusiastic about the material they had, in Brooklyn, New York City rearranging the songs. They then recorded at Magic Studios in New York City with Kaye over the course of a week in June 2001; by this point, they had nine tracks in total. Woomble said Kaye was helped in his development as a songwriter, as Kaye aiding him in focusing on his lyrics, which no prior producer assisted in.

By the end of June 2001, they had returned to the UK, and were mixing the material they did with Street at Townhouse in London. They were scheduled to tour the US again in July and August 2001; however, due to Jones requiring hospitalisation for three weeks for a "bruised prostate", it was cancelled. In August 2001, they spent two and a half weeks writing and re-doing 20 songs at a cottage in Inchnadamph, located in the Scottish Highlands. Following appearances at the V and Gig on the Green festivals that same month, the band continued working. Ten of the songs they had at this stage "weren't fitting together", according to Woomble, due to being recorded in between separate tours. EMI, who owned Palophone, approved of the demos they had done and allowed them to restart the album with Eringa as the producer. Following this, they practiced in Edinburgh, before traveling down to Wales in September 2001.

The band and Eringa recorded at Rockfield Studios in Monmouthshire, Wales; sessions progressed slowly, and by the end of the month, Parlophone were still not content with the results. In October and November 2001, they recorded at Sawmills Studios in Cornwall; Woomble said these sessions "need[ed] to matter [...] People expect something from us, and yet we never seem to be able to convince them". Following this, they went to London, where they recorded at RAK Studios in December 2001. After a brief break at home for Christmas, they returned to RAK in January 2002; it was during this period that Parlophone finally gave the band their approval. Eringa, with engineer Guy Massey, produced nearly all of the final recordings on the album; him and Massey produced "Live in a Hiding Place" together, while Street produced "Tell Me Ten Words" while Cenzo Townshend as engineer. Sixteen tracks were recorded in total across all of the studios. Eringa mixed all of the recordings in January 2002 with assistant Dan Grech-Marguerat, prior to the album being mastered by Howie Weinberg at Masterdisk in New York City the following month.

== Composition and lyrics ==
Musically, the sound of The Remote Part has been described as alternative rock and indie rock, with influence from Nirvana, Joni Mitchell, and Red House Painters. Its big sound was compared to that of Out of Time (1991) by R.E.M. It lacked any of the punk rock traits of the band's previous releases, utilizing more layers of vocals and guitars, alongside the addition of keyboards and strings. Discussing the album's title, Woomble said it came up during a conversation with poet laureate Edwin Morgan; it was originally named Scottish Fiction and then Living in Fiction, before being christened The Remote Part. Jones said they had planned to make a double album, where all of the electric songs would be on the first half and all the acoustic ones would be on the second part, though he was unsure as to when this idea was dropped. He considered the time they spent in Inchnadamph to be important to the development of their style, embracing the pop sensibility of their sound, which he said was always present albeit in a reduced manner.

The album's opening track, "You Held the World in Your Arms", features a string arrangement by Sally Herbert, and a synthesizer. It was the first song the band had written when they were in the Scottish Highlands. The song initially lacked the instrumental section that opened it, instead beginning with the slow verse. After some feedback from the label, Eringa attached the chorus as the opening part. The power pop track "A Modern Way of Letting Go" was compared to the work of the Foo Fighters and echoed the band's roots. It was Woomble's attempt at "deconstruct[ing] the idea of a rock song in a rock song". The U2-esque ballad "American English" uses acoustic guitarwork and piano. When first working on the song with Kaye, it lasted for longer and featured a spoken-word portion. It is about American poet Walt Whitman, the role an author can play in their song, and how meanings can be distorted.

"I Never Wanted", co-written between the band, previous guitarist Jeremy Mills, and touring guitarist Allan Stewart, is a mid-tempo ballad that is reminiscent of The Soft Bulletin (1999)-era Flaming Lips. The Ash-indebted "(I Am) What I Am Not" was influenced by the writing of Fernando Pessoa in his book The Book of Disquiet (1982). "Live in a Hiding Place" is an acoustic track with piano during the chorus sections. "Out of Routine" was originally titled "Ceilidh Hard", which was named after "Party Hard" (2001) by Andrew W.K. "Century After Century" is a mid-tempo song; "Tell Me Ten Words" evokes the sound of R.E.M., and opens with a country-like guitar intro. "Stay the Same" is a hard rock song. The album's closing track "In Remote Part/Scottish Fiction" ends with a spoken-word narrative from Morgan about the band's Scottish identity. When first contacting Morgan, Woomble had sent him a letter where he told him of his admiration for Morgan's work. Woomble had been a fan of Morgan's since his teenage years, and detailed identity and belonging in his letter. Morgan replied with his own letter, which concluded with a poem that ended up becoming "Scottish Fiction".

== Release ==
On 27 February 2002, The Remote Part was announced for release in five months' time. They went on a short tour of the United Kingdom a week later. They embarked on a longer UK tour April and May 2002. They appeared at T in the Park and Glastonbury Festival. The Remote Part was released on 15 July 2002 through Parlophone. The concept for the artwork was done by Woomble; it consists of an image from the film My Way Home (1978), which was provided by the British Film Institute. The liner notes include the phrase "support your local poet", to which Woomble explained it was satire as they had been "tagged as this 'lyrical/poetic' band". It was promoted with in-store performances and signings at Virgin Megastores.

Following this, the band appeared at V festival in August 2002. In September and October 2002, the band went on a tour of Europe. On 1 October 2002, it was announced that bassist Bob Fairfoull had left the band, and was temporarily replaced by bass technician Alex Grant. Fairfoull, who later joined Degrassi, reportedly quit the band following a fight with Woomble; he did not like the direction the band's music was going in. For the rest of the month, the band supported Coldplay on their UK arena tour and then in Europe. On 20 November 2002, it was announced that Gavin Fox of Turn would permanently fill Fairfoull's role. Alongside this, Stewart, who had been part of the band's crew, became their full-time guitarist.

In spite of Fox's addition, Grant still continued on bass through to the band's December 2002 UK tour, which was supported by the Walkmen and labelmates the Star Spangles. In January and February 2003, the band went on another tour of the UK, leading up to a performance at the 2003 NME Awards. Following this, they embarked on a tour of Australia. The Remote Part was released in the US by Capitol Records on 25 March 2003; fans were given a promotional EP that featured "You Held the World in Your Arms", "The Nothing I Know", "Everything Flows" and a live version of "In Remote Part/Scottish Fiction". The band went on a headlining tour of that territory in the same month, appeared at Coachella, and had a supporting slot for Pearl Jam on their US arena tour in May and June 2003. During this trek, the band performed on Last Call with Carson Daly and Jimmy Kimmel Live!. Soon afterwards, the band performed at the Glastonbury, Move, Frequency and T in the Park festivals.

=== Singles ===
"You Held the World in Your Arms" was released as a single on 15 April 2002. Two versions were released on CD: the first with "All This Information", "No Generation", and the music video for "You Held the World in Your Arms", while the second included "A Distant History" and "I Was Made to Think It". The "You Held the World in Your Arms" music video was posted on Dotmusic four days later; it was directed by Sam Arthur. "American English" was released as a single on 1 July 2002. Two versions were released on CD: the first with "Poor Thing", "These Are Just Years", and the music video for "American English" (directed by Alex Smith), while the second featured "The Nothing I Know" and "We Always Have to Impress".

"Live in a Hiding Place" was released as a single on 21 October 2002. Two versions were released on CD: the first with "Great Times Wasted", "Everything Flows", and the music video for "Live in a Hiding Place" (directed by Wim Wenders), while the second included "I Found That Essence Rare", and a live version of "I'm Happy to Be Here Tonight". "A Modern Way of Letting Go" was released as a single on 10 February 2003. The CD version included versions of "A Modern Way of Letting Go" and "In Remote Part/Scottish Fiction", while the DVD edition featured audio of a radio session version of "(I Am) What I Am Not", the music video for "A Modern Way of Letting Go" (directed by Smith), and footage of the band in New York City. "A Modern Way of Letting Go" was released to modern rock radio stations in the US in June 2003.

=== Full-album performances and related releases ===
The Remote Part was played in full in December 2008 at King Tut's Wah Wah Hut in Glasgow as part of a series of shows where the band performed all of their albums. They performed it again across a few shows in 2017 and 2018, one of which featured Fairfoull. It was released as a two-CD package with their 100 Broken Windows in 2011. "You Held the World in Your Arms", "American English", "A Modern Way of Letting Go", "In Remote Part/Scottish Fiction", and "Live in a Hiding Place" were included on the band's first compilation album, Scottish Fiction: Best of 1997–2007 (2007), alongside the music videos for all of the album's singles. "A Modern Way of Letting Go", "American English", and a live version of "American English" were included on the band's third compilation album, The Collection (2010).

== Reception ==
Professional ratings
Aggregate scores
Source	Rating
Metacritic	83/100
Review scores
Source	Rating
AllMusic	4/5 stars
Blender	4/5 stars
Entertainment Weekly	A−
The Guardian	3/5 stars
NME	9/10
Pitchfork	6.5/10
Q	4/5 stars
Rolling Stone	4/5 stars
Spin	B−
USA Today	3.5/4 stars

The Remote Part was met with universal acclaim from music critics. At Metacritic, which assigns a normalized rating out of 100 to reviews from mainstream publications, the album received an average score of 83, based on 20 reviews.

John Donohue of Blender said that the band could not use "goonish rockers" as a pretence anymore as their "romantic natures have taken over, to great effect". He added that the band "show their true smarts by continuing to attack every track with youthful energy and passion". Chris Long for BBC Manchester Music noted that there was "moments when you think the band's fallen into only being able to write fast rock or slow ballad, and there's nothing in-between, [...] but it never lasts long enough to offend". AllMusic reviewer MacKenzie Wilson wrote that the band had found what they were looking for: "a beautiful calmness and a comfortable spot to reflect upon – and The Remote Part flawlessly does the job". She added that it was "obvious" based on their earlier material that the band were "headed to this point in their career". Entertainment Weekly's Brian M. Raftery found the album to be a "perfectly fine collection of emotive, big-ambition British rock songs".

In a review for NME, Mark Beaumont saw the album as a "bold, bright, broken and bitter beast" that showcases a band that "burst out of their student-sheep’s clothing and rip the throat out of Coldplay". Rolling Stone reviewer Gaylord Fields said the band "ratchet up the latent R.E.M.-isms, elevating themselves heads above their musical kin". Pitchfork contributor Rob Mitchum saw the album's potential for "alt-rock hits [...] where each and every song could be a single". The Guardian music correspondent Dave Simpson noted that the album was "musically anthemic but lyrically introspective". Spin's Andrew Beaujon wrote that the band were "compelling when they put Woomble's sad-sack lyrics front and center," though on a few songs, their "turgid squall swamps his words".

The Remote Part charted at number two in Scotland, and number three in the UK. It also reached number 39 in Ireland, and number 135 in France. "You Held the World in Your Arms" charted at number four in Scotland, and number nine in the UK. "American English" charted at number eight in Scotland, and number 15 on the UK. "Live in a Hiding Place" charted at number 17 in Scotland, and number 26 in the UK. "A Modern Way of Letting Go" charted at number 21 in Scotland, and number 28 in the UK. The Remote Part was certified gold by the British Phonographic Industry (BPI). Playlouder ranked the album at number 10 on their list of the top 50 albums of 2002.

== Track listing ==
All songs by Idlewild, except where noted.

The Remote Part track listing
No.	Title	Writer(s)	Producer	Length
1.	"You Held the World in Your Arms"		Dave Eringa	3:21
2.	"A Modern Way of Letting Go"		Eringa	2:23
3.	"American English"		Eringa	4:34
4.	"I Never Wanted"	Idlewild; Jeremy Mills; Allan Stewart	Eringa	3:55
5.	"(I Am) What I Am Not"		Eringa	2:43
6.	"Live in a Hiding Place"		Eringa; Guy Massey	3:16
7.	"Out of Routine"		Eringa	3:09
8.	"Century After Century"		Eringa	4:01
9.	"Tell Me Ten Words"		Stephen Street	3:46
10.	"Stay the Same"		Eringa	3:11
11.	"In Remote Part/Scottish Fiction"	Idlewild; Edwin Morgan	Eringa	3:55
Total length:				40:32

== Personnel ==
Personnel per booklet.

Idlewild

- Bob Fairfoull – bass
- Rod Jones – guitar
- Colin Newton – drums
- Roddy Woomble – vocals

Additional musicians

- Jeremy Mills – piano (track 11)
- Allan Stewart – extra guitar (track 11)
- Sally Herbert – string arrangement (track 1)
- Edwin Morgan – voice (track 11)

Production and design

- Dave Eringa – producer, mixing
- Guy Massey – engineer, producer (track 6)
- Stephen Street – producer (track 9)
- Cenzo Townshend – engineer (track 9)
- Mark Thomas – engineer - Sawmills
- Dan Grech-Marguerat – assistant
- Howie Weinberg – mastering
- Roddy Woomble – artwork concept
- Traffic – art direction, design
- Danny Clinch – band photography
- British Film Institute – original cover image

== Charts and certifications ==
=== Weekly charts ===
Chart performance for The Remote Part
Charts (2002)	Peak position
Europe (European Top 100 Albums)	12
French Albums (SNEP)	135
Greek Albums (IFPI)	50
Irish Albums (IRMA)	39
Scottish Albums (Official Charts)	2
UK Albums (Official Charts)	3

=== Certifications ===
Certifications for The Remote Part
Region	Certification	Certified units/sales
United Kingdom (BPI)	Gold	100,000^{^}
^{^} Shipments figures based on certification alone.
