= Rod Jones (musician) =

British musician (born 1976)

- Jones performing on 24 July 2006.

Background information
- Born: Rodric Iwan Pryce Jones; 3 December 1976 (age 49); Durban, KwaZulu-Natal, South Africa
- Origin: Leeds, West Yorkshire, England
- Genre: Indie rock
- Occupations: Musician, guitarist, backing vocalist
- Instruments: guitar, vocals
- Years active: 1995–present
- Website: rodjonesmusic.com

Rodric Iwan Pryce Jones (born 3 December 1976) is a South African-born British guitarist, singer, songwriter and music producer. He is best known as a founding member of Scottish indie rock band Idlewild, with whom he has co-written and recorded ten studio albums. Jones has released two solo albums and fronted the rock band The Birthday Suit. He is also a co-creator of the ongoing musical project The Fruit Tree Foundation.

== Early life ==
Jones was born in Durban, South Africa and grew up in London and Leeds, England. His parents are classical musicians, English soprano Alison Jack and Welsh conductor John Pryce-Jones. Jones began playing music at four years of age and initially resisted the musical influence of his parents.

Jones' first job was working as a kitchen porter at a Harry Ramsden's restaurant. The first piece of recorded music he purchased was the "Do they know it's Christmas?" single, by the Band Aid project.

== Musical career ==
=== Idlewild ===
Idlewild formed in Edinburgh, with the original line-up consisting of Jones, Roddy Woomble, Phil Scanlon and Colin Newton. Jones first met Newton and Woomble at an Edinburgh university, and the band proceeded to release seven albums and three compilations—two albums debuted in the UK "Top 10" chart, while twelve of Idlewild's singles ranked in the UK "Top 40" chart. Together with the band, Jones toured extensively, both in the UK and internationally, in headline and supporting roles; Idlewild toured with popular bands such as R.E.M., U2, The Rolling Stones, Pearl Jam and Coldplay. Following Idlewild's commitments for the band's seventh album, Post Electric Blues (released in October 2009), an "indefinite hiatus" was announced.

=== Solo ===
Jones released his debut solo album, A Sentimental Education, in 2009. In a 2010 interview with The List website, Jones briefly explained the history of his inaugural solo effort: "This album only started out as a hobby initially,’ he says. 'I recorded the songs on my own and worked on them for about a year, until it got to the point that I thought what I was doing was actually OK." Music journalist, Chris Buckle, writing for the UK "independent cultural" media outlet, The Skinny, awarded the album two "stars" out of a possible total of five, stating that "his [Jones] voice is passable but leaves little impression, which wouldn't be a problem if the songs imposed themselves more strongly."

Jones released his second solo album, A Generation Innocence, in August 2012; however, while writing for the second album, Jones encountered a hurdle at the halfway mark, as he discovered that he was not satisfied with any of the material that he had written thus far. In 2011, Jones explained, "I was a bit fed up with the whole folk music thing – I mean every man and his dog was doing the faux folk thing"—Jones then proceeded to learn the drums and eventually formed the band, The Birthday Suit, to record the material that he had created in the period following the drumming diversion.

=== The Fruit Tree Foundation ===
In 2010, Jones founded The Fruit Tree Foundation "mental health arts group", alongside former Delgados guitarist and vocalist, Emma Pollock, and musician, Jill O'Sullivan, in order to raise awareness of mental health issues. In an article promoting Jones' participation in the Scottish Mental Health Arts and Film Festival (SMHAFF), the musician revealed that he had previously suffered depression and explained the importance of music as a support mechanism: "It is such a universal art form. A positive force. It can really change your mood, both watching and playing ... There's such a loneliness and stigma associated with mental illness but music can really bring people together." Jones was a member of a music initiative, entitled "Music Like A Vitamin", that has appeared twice at the SMHAFF. As of October 2012, Jones was running community-based music therapy workshops in Edinburgh, Scotland.

=== The Birthday Suit ===
In late 2011, Jones formed The Birthday Suit and described the band as "essentially a solo project ... It's an ever-changing bistro of musicians." The band released its debut album, The Eleventh Hour, in October 2011. Writing for the PopMatters website, David Bloom, critiqued the album in the following manner (Bloom rated the album "6" out of a possible 10):

... The Eleventh Hour plows along with a familiar intensity and melodic flavor, which should please most Idlewild fans, but also makes it suffer by comparison. Jones' known strengths as a writer and guitarist work against him as a lead vocalist, as his limitations are put into sharpest relief against those songs that most resemble his work with Idlewild; it's hard to not hear Woomble's iconic delivery doing them greater justice.

The Birthday Suit's second studio album, A Conversation Well Rehearsed was released on 3 December 2012. The album was listed in 19th place in the Clean Slate Music website's "Top 21 Albums of 2012" list, although the website write that the second album "doesn't carry the punch" of the band's debut album.

=== Collaborations ===
In 2000, Jones played second guitar for Graham Coxon on a UK solo tour that occurred in 2000.

Jones collaborated with Woomble on his solo album, My Secret is My Silence, released in 2006.

In 2006, Jones recorded a self-titled album with singer, Inara George, called George is Jones. The album was due for release in the autumn of 2006; however, the project has not been revived after a period of hiatus and has yet to be released. Jones notes that a release of the album is "doubtful", a situation that is due to "too many problems surrounding it."

== Personal life ==
Jones has been married twice. The song "Me and Mrs Jones" by Billy Paul was played at his first wedding. He married his second wife, Fiona, in September 2025, after a five-month engagement.

== Discography ==
=== Solo ===
- A Sentimental Education (2010)
- A Generation Innocence (2012)

=== Idlewild ===
- Captain (1998)
- Hope Is Important (1998)
- 100 Broken Windows (2000)
- The Remote Part (2002)
- Warnings/Promises (2005)
- Make Another World (2007)
- Post Electric Blues (2009)
- Everything Ever Written (2015)
- Interview Music (2019)
- Idlewild (2025)

=== The Birthday Suit ===
- The Eleventh Hour (2011)
- A Conversation Well Rehearsed (2012)
- A Hollow Hole Of Riches (2014)

=== The Fruit Tree Foundation ===
- First Edition (2011)

=== George is Jones ===
- George is Jones (unreleased) (2006)

=== Roddy Woomble ===
- My Secret is My Silence (2006)

=== Under One Sky ===
- Under One Sky (2009)
