= Desalvo (band) =

British metalcore band

Desalvo is a Scottish metalcore band from Glasgow, formed in 1998.

== History ==
Desalvo were formed by former PH Family and Idlewild bassist Alex Grant, former Stretchheads drummer Richie Dempsey, and Allan Stewart who then went on to also join Idlewild. Their original vocalist Fraser Lumsden, also of PH Family, left the band in 1999 and was replaced by former Stretchheads vocalist P6 (Phil Eaglesham).

The band released their debut full-length album, Mood Poisoner, on Mogwai's Rock Action Records in 2008.

Desalvo split in 2011. In 2022, the band announced gig dates, their first in 11 years. More writing and future shows are being planned.

== Musical style ==
Desalvo was originally strongly influenced by US post-hardcore bands such as Helmet, but later developed a more metallic and progressive sound akin to Converge. The band have also been compared to The Jesus Lizard. They have been described as "one of Scotland's most prominent sociopathic hardcore acts".

Kerrang! described their debut set Mood Poisoner as "one of the heaviest albums of the year", and said P6's singing "best resembles a dalek attempting to make chicken noises".

== Discography ==
- Mood Poisoner (2008, Rock Action Records)
