= Bob Fairfoull =

British musician (born 1976)

Robert James "Bob" Fairfoull (born 6 August 1976) is a Scottish musician. He was the bass guitarist for the Scottish rock band Idlewild. He attended Portobello High School in Edinburgh between 1992–96 and was in the same class as Paul Thomson, the drummer from the band Franz Ferdinand.

Roddy Woomble - a friend of Fairfoull and Idlewild's lead singer - asked Fairfoull to join in February 1997 following the departure of Phil Scanlon. His appearance and attitude are classically punk rock and his typical on-stage antics consist of head-banging and jumping around.

Fairfoull became increasingly distant from the band in 2002, often going drinking on his own after shows and sitting separately on their tour bus. On 29 September 2002 he left the band following a show in Amsterdam in "a rain of misdirected punches".

After leaving Idlewild, Fairfoull joined the band Degrassi, having been friends with its members for the past six years and feeling that their music possessed the rock edge that Idlewild had lost. He has had various other projects on the go, along with Degrassi, and has played in Edinburgh with the band Paper Beats Rock, who have supported Blood Red Shoes.

In 2009, when asked if the members of Idlewild remain friends with Fairfoull, Rod Jones stated that "there are no bad feelings between any of us and we have all seen Bob a few times over the last few years and remain on good terms." For his part, Fairfoull did not begrudge the band for carrying on without him and approved of being replaced by his good friend Gavin Fox, though he did remark, "It felt a bit like if you left your wife, and a week later she started shagging your brother." Fifteen years after leaving the band, Fairfoull joined Idlewild onstage as a surprise guest to play several songs at shows marking the 15th anniversary of the album The Remote Part in Glasgow and Edinburgh. in november 2021 Fairfoull re joined idlewild for their 25th anniversary shows. These shows were later than expected due to the Covid pandemic.

According to Fairfoulls Facebook page as of 2026, he spends his life with his partner and step children in London.
