= Roddy Woomble =

Scottish singer (born 1976)

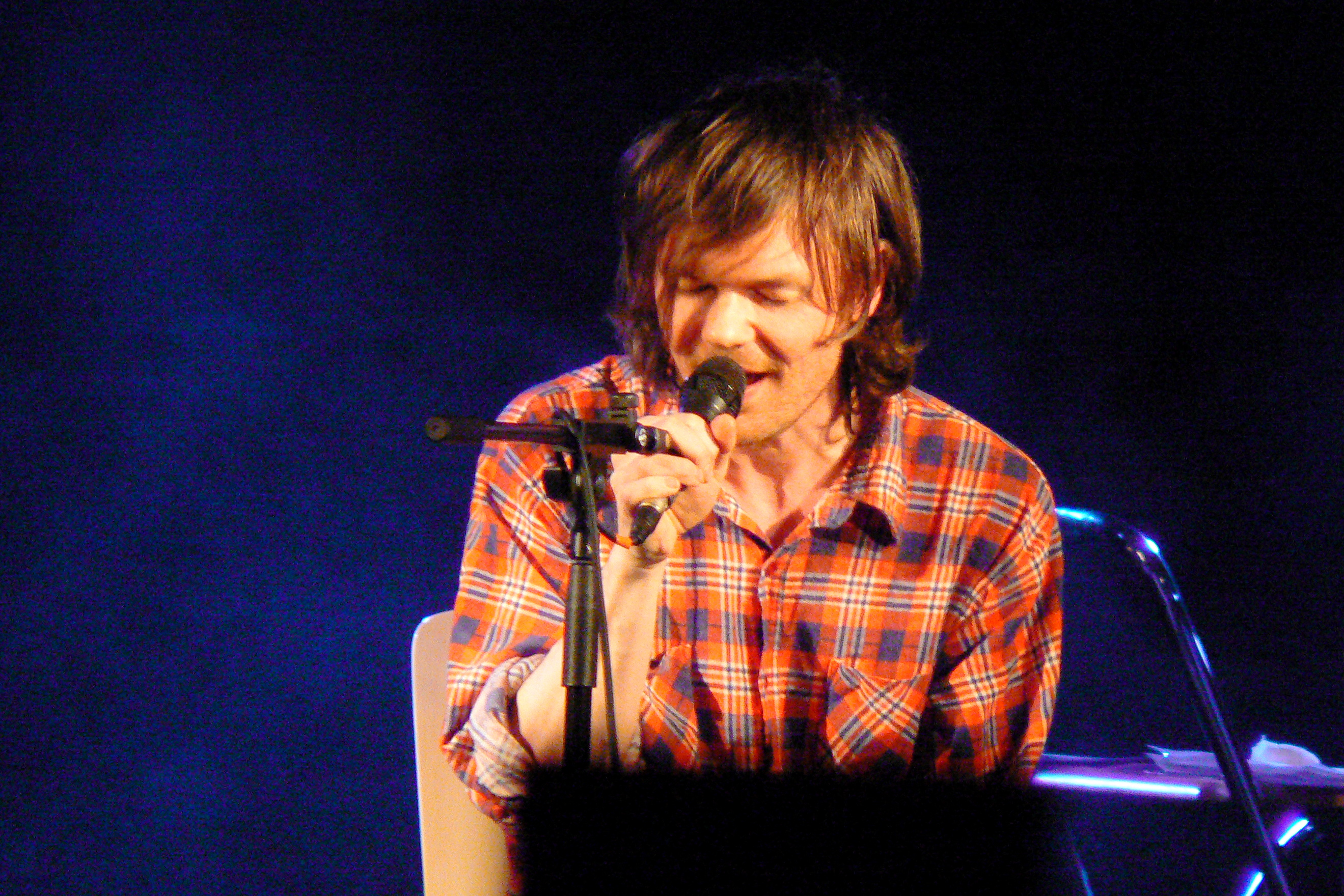
- Woomble performing in 2009

Background information
- Born: Roddy Woomble; 13 August 1976 (age 50)
- Origin: Irvine, North Ayrshire, Scotland
- Genres: Indie rock, folk
- Occupations: Singer, songwriter
- Years active: 1995–present
- Labels: Parlophone, Pure
- Member of: Idlewild
- Website: roddywoomble.net

Roddy Woomble (born 13 August 1976) is a Scottish singer and songwriter. He is the lead vocalist of the indie rock band Idlewild, with whom he has recorded ten studio albums. Celebrated for his poetic lyrics and warm, baritone voice, Woomble has released seven solo studio albums: My Secret Is My Silence (2006), The Impossible Song & Other Songs (2011), Listen to Keep (2013), The Deluder (2017), Lo! Soul (2021), Almost Nothing (2023) and Sometime During the Night We Fell Off the Map (2024).

In 2007, Woomble curated a collaborative studio album between Scottish writers and musicians, entitled Ballads of the Book, and recorded a collaborative album with folk musicians Kris Drever and John McCusker in 2008, called Before the Ruin. In 2020, Woomble released the Everyday Sun EP which featured largely spoken word pieces over minimal, ambient backing. He followed this sound and direction into 2021's Lo Soul which he recorded at home during the COVID-19 pandemic, and 2023's electronica-influenced Almost Nothing.

== Musical career ==
=== Idlewild ===
Idlewild was formed in 1995 in Edinburgh by Woomble, Rod Jones, Colin Newton and Phil Scanlon. The band achieved critical and commercial success over ten albums and have toured worldwide. Their sound has moved from the punk rock of their earlier records, to the refined and thoughtful melodic rock of their latter albums. Their latest album was 2025's self-titled Idlewild. In 2020 they celebrated twenty five years as a band with a special UK tour and accompanying book titled 'In The Beginning There Were Answers; 25 years of Idlewild' which was written by Woomble.

=== Solo ===
Woomble performing in 2007

In 2006, Woomble worked with several musicians including Kate Rusby, Idlewild guitarist Rod Jones and Dave Gow and Ailidh Lennon from Sons and Daughters on his debut solo album My Secret Is My Silence, produced by John McCusker. The album was released in July 2006, and Woomble toured the UK in support of the album's release. My Secret Is My Silence reached number one in the UK Folk Charts. A year later, on 10 July 2007, My Secret Is My Silence was released in the US on 7–10 Music.

Woomble's follow-up album, Before the Ruin, written and recorded with Kris Drever and John McCusker, was released on 15 September 2008 through Navigator Records.

In 2009 Woomble re-located to the Isle of Mull in the Scottish Hebrides and began work on a new album entitled The Impossible Song & Other Songs. It was released in 2011 and was recorded entirely at the An Tobar arts centre in Tobermory on the Isle of Mull and features a cast of musicians from the Scottish folk scene. The album was accompanied by extensive touring around the UK.

The country influenced Listen to Keep followed in 2013, before Woomble concentrated again on Idlewild, returning attention back to his solo career with 2017's The Deluder, a darker and more introspective album. After the release of 2019's Interview Music album with Idlewild, Woomble changed direction again with the Everyday Sun EP (2020) and Lo! Soul (2021) which both share a minimal, electronic sound.

In 2023 Woomble launched a new, largely electronic project called Almost Nothing. He supported the Walkmen on their UK and Ireland tour.

His most recent album Sometime During the Night We Fell off the Map was released in October 2024. The album was recorded on the Isle of Mull in a church in Bunessan and was produced by his frequent collaborator Sorren Maclean.

== Writings ==
Woomble has published two books - a collection of his lyrics and poems entitled Instrumentals (2016) and a retrospective book about Idlewild In the Beginning There Were Answers (2020). He has also written columns and articles for a selection of publications including The Sunday Herald, The List, The Idler and The Great Outdoors.

== Personal life ==
Woomble moved frequently during his childhood, living in Scotland, France, England and the United States. After Idlewild's initial success he lived in London then New York City, before returning to Glasgow in 2005. In 2008 Woomble and his wife Ailidh Lennon moved to the Isle of Mull; their son Uist was born the same year. The family later relocated to Iona although the couple separated. In 2023 he had a daughter with his partner, designer Roisin Reilly.

== Discography ==
Studio albums

- My Secret Is My Silence (2006)
- Before the Ruin (2008) (with Kris Drever and John McCusker)
- The Impossible Song & Other Songs (2011)
- Listen to Keep (2013)
- The Deluder (2017)
- Lo! Soul (2021)
- Almost Nothing (2023) (as Almost Nothing)
- Sometime During the Night We Fell Off the Map (2024)

EPs

- Everyday Sun (2020)

Live albums

- Live at Kings Place (2014) (as Roddy Woomble & Band)

== See also ==
- Scottish folk music
- Edinburgh culture
