= Dan Whitehouse =

English singer-songwriter (born 1979)

- Born: 9 March 1979 (age 47)
- Origin: Wolverhampton, England
- Genres: Singer-songwriter, Folk music
- Years active: 1997–present
- Labels: Tiger Dan Records; Sotones; The Heantun Recording Co. Reveal Records; WTK
- Website: dan-whitehouse.com

Dan Whitehouse (born 9 March 1979) is an English songwriter and musician. He is known for his distinctive voice and understated songwriting. His 2012 album Reaching for a State of Mind was made with percussionist Chip Bailey, a collaborator of Duke Special, and won critical acclaim as having lyrical vulnerability and imaginative musical settings.

Music Republic Magazine described Whitehouse as "A triple threat, a fine songwriter, a unique vocal talent and a talented multi-instrumentalist/performer".

== Career ==
The son of a Wolverhampton community radio pioneer, Whitehouse was inspired by his father's record collection, gaining a "deep respect for song-writing technique".

After stints performing with Naomi (1998–2000) and fronting rock band Sonara, who performed at Reading Festival, Whitehouse went solo in 2007. He has since supported such acts as Maria McKee, Julian Cope, Peter Green, Josh Ritter, Caitlin Rose, 10cc, World Party, Joseph Arthur, Willy Mason and Simone Felice, as well as Eddi Reader, The Little Unsaid, Kris Drever and Joan As Policewoman.

Whitehouse released his debut record, the seven-track The Balloon EP, in 2009. This was followed by The Bubble EP later that year. Lead track, You Can't Give Me Anymore, was described as being reminiscent "of waves crashing on a beach." The track also featured Dan's first collaboration with pedal steel guitar player B. J. Cole.

His final release of 2009 was The Box EP. Collectively, the three 2009 EPs form a trilogy exploring themes of "life, love, loss and happiness."

Whitehouse's self-titled debut album was released in 2012, and was partially recorded in the songwriter's flat over a period of time with acoustic instrumentation. The album also included Theremin, an electric screwdriver, and, on the song "My Stupid Face", ambient sounds recorded at Birmingham shopping centre the Bullring. ."

In 2013, Whitehouse released his more ambitious second full album, Reaching for a State of Mind. Recorded in a professional studio with producer Michael Clarke and a full band, notable guests included Ezio guitarist Booga, Helen Lancaster from folk act The Old Dance School, Fairport Convention's PJ Wright, and Duke Special's percussionist Chip Bailey. The album's 11 tracks were culled from an initial long-list of 35 home-recorded demos".

Despite the inclusion of two notable folk musicians, the album is described as sitting "within a fairly wide spectrum of pop-rock-folk-Americana-roots influences."
Artree described the album as "more intricately crafted and refined" than previous work, and a "musical evolution."

The album was launched at The Crescent Theatre, Birmingham, in September 2013, with a special guest appearance from Duke Special. The show was a sell-out. After an opening solo set, Duke later joined Whitehouse on stage for a version of Neil Young's Helpless.

Four previously unreleased tracks recording during the Reaching for a State Of Mind sessions were later released as Reaching for a Further State of Mind EP.

In 2014, Whitehouse toured North America for the first time with accordion-playing German-American singer-songwriter Anja McCloskey, and released a joint-EP, Still, which was recorded in Birmingham. The two met while at university together in London, and Anja has described their collaboration as "alternative folk."

During August 2014, Whitehouse performed at Moseley Folk Festival between The Felice Brothers and Richard Thompson where he performed material from his third album Raw State. The album features both new tracks and reimagined versions of previously released songs, and was produced by Danny George Wilson and Chris Clarke of Danny and the Champions of the World. The album continues Dan's collaboration with B. J. Cole.

Whitehouse signed to Reveal Records for his fourth album, 2016's Introducing. He also released a series of EPs, the fourth of which, EP 4: Sings Boo, saw Dan tackle songs either written wholly by, or co-written by Boo Hewerdine.

During 2016/2017, Whitehouse began working with Birmingham-based singer-songwriter and pianist Danielle Cawdell on her debut recording. The album, Silence Set Me Free was released in February 2018 with Whitehouse acting as producer and co-writer, as well as playing on the tracks.

=== Dreamland Tomorrow ===
After four years, Whitehouse's third album for Reveal was released in May 2020. Entitled Dreamland Tomorrow the 22 track collection was produced by Boo Hewerdine and Reveal record label boss Tom Rose, and featured contributions from John Elliott (The Little Unsaid), Eric Lane (Joan As Police Woman) minimalist composer Richard J. Birkin, Emily Barker, and BBC Jazz Award winning Saxophonist Xhosa Cole.

The album was pulled together from a collection of around 70 demos. Disc 1 is described as "experimental" while disc 2 is "rawer, more live setting".

FolkRadio stated that Dreamland Tomorrow unveiled "a strikingly new maturity and willingness to push the envelope," which saw Whitehouse "adopting an experimental approach and more expansive sound palette." NorthernSky observed the experimental material was "reminiscent of Scott Walker's more adventurous exploits" while England On Sunday asked "is Dan Whitehouse the David Bowie of folk?"

The release was complemented by the 6-track Dreamland Live EP, featuring live versions of selected album tracks, alongside several remixes, including Tomorrow by Gustaf Ljunggren.

Dan extended the textural approach featured on the first part of the album for his soundtrack to Charlie Chaplin's The Vagabond - a commission for Birmingham Comedy Festival 2020.

=== The Glass Age ===
Dan's sixth album, entitled The Glass Age was released in July 2022. The album reflects on how the human experience and ways of connecting have changed during the age of computers and mobile phones and was described by The Sunday Times as brimming with “subtle and delicate melodies.”

A companion album, Reflections On The Glass Age, saw Dan revisiting the songs from The Glass Age. Described as "an acoustic sequel" the 2023 release presents "the same songs stripped back."

== Sound ==
Dan Whitehouse's music has been described as "romanticist folk" and "alternative folk rock on a grand imposing scale". South Wales Evening Post described Whitehouse as a "reflective songwriter ... a sensitive singer, with blues and folk leanings.". He has also been compared to Nick Drake and Richard Hawley, "an artist to whom he should both be justly compared and share the same sort of critical acclaim." Reviewing Reaching For A State Of Mind, Folking praised the album's "searing honesty"

Reviewing 2020's Dreamland Tomorrow, FRUK described Whitehouse as "a master craftsman and wordsmith."

Whitehouse cites artists such as The Beatles, Neil Young, Bob Dylan, Elton John, Bob Dylan, Otis Redding, eels and John Grant as among his influences.

== Projects ==
Dan has been involved in numerous projects, including producing a new soundtrack to a silent Charlie Chaplin film, The Vagabond, for Birmingham Comedy Festival in 2020, and a collaborative project with US Hammered Dulcimer player Max ZT.

=== Voices From The Cones ===
The Voices From The Cones project (circa 2019-2022) saw Dan collaborate with Midlands author, poet and storyteller John Edgar to bring to life the stories of those who worked in the Black Country's glass industry. The project was instigated by Ruskin Mill Trust.

A series of live theatre-based performances, which included between song narration created by John, was followed by an album of the same name featuring guests John Elliott, Chris Cleverley, Kim Lowings, Gustaf Ljunggren, Nicole Justice and Lukas Drinkwater. The double-album was described as a "splendid example of storytelling."

Described as being "reminiscent of Ewan MacColl’s radio ballads," the recording of the song cycle reached No.38 in the UK Official Album Downloads Chart and No.15 in the UK Official Folk Albums Chart.

=== Ten Steps with Max ZT ===
Introduced via the international Global Music Match project (which was organisted by English Folk Expo) in May 2021, Dan and Brooklyn-based Grammy-nominated Max ZT (from House of Waters) toured for the first time later the same year, before going on to release the collaborative album, Ten Steps, in 2023.

The album was described as "mesmerising and hypnotic ... a beautifully crafted piece of work" by Music Republic while FolkRadio UK (now KLOF) described the album as "deeply intuitive, poetic and rewarding" - listing it as one of the Folk and Alternative Albums of the Year.

== Discography ==
=== EPs ===
Year	Title	Format	Label	
2009	The Balloon EP	CD/Digital	Tiger Dan Records	
2009	The Bubble EP	CD/Digital	Tiger Dan Records	
2009	The Box EP	CD/Digital	Tiger Dan Records	
2014	Still (with Anja McCloskey)	CD/Digital	Sotones Records	
2014	Reaching Further for a State of Mind	Digital	Tiger Dan Records	
2016	EP1	Digital/CD	Reveal Records	
2016	EP2	Digital/CD	Reveal Records	
2016	EP3	Digital/CD	Reveal Records	
2016	Sings Boo EP (EP4)	Digital/CD	Reveal Records	
2020	Dreamland Live	Digital/CD	Reveal Records	-

=== Albums ===
Year	Title	Format	Label
2012	Dan Whitehouse	CD/Digital	Tiger Dan Records
2013	Reaching for a State of Mind	CD/Digital	Tiger Dan Records
2014	Raw State	CD/Digital	The Heantun Recording Co.
2016	Introducing (Compilation)	CD/Digital	Reveal Records
2016	That's Where I Belong	CD/Digital	Reveal Records
2020	Dreamland Tomorrow	CD/Digital	Reveal Records
2022	The Glass Age	CD/Vinyl/Digital	WTK
2022	Voices From The Cones	CD/Digital	WTK
2023	Reflections On The Glass Age	CD/Digital	WTK
2023	Ten Steps (with Max ZT)	Vinyl/Digital	WTK
2026	Only Love	CD/Digital	WTK011

==== Additional appearances ====
- 2018: Silence Set Me Free – Danielle Cawdell (10-track album released via The Heantun Recording Co; co-writer, producer and musician).
- 2023: Drawing Lines – Katie Whitehouse (WTK) - album producer, vocals/guitar.
- 2025: '[W E E K]' - datshredboi (5-track electronic EP; vocals)
