= Birmingham Comedy Festival =

Annual arts festival in Britain

- Genre: Comedy
- Frequency: Annually
- Locations: Birmingham, West Midlands, England
- Inaugurated: 2001
- Attendance: c. 10,000+
- Website: www.bhamcomfest.co.uk

Birmingham Comedy Festival is an annual arts festival in the city of Birmingham. The festival traditionally takes place throughout the city for 10 days during October. While primarily focused on stand-up comedy, it also includes films, theatre, cabaret, visual arts, spoken word, music, dance.

== History ==
Birmingham Comedy Festival has been drawing attention to the city's vibrant (and often unsung) comedy scene since 2001 when the debut festival hit the road running thanks to appearances from Peter Kay, Sean Lock and Jon Ronson, as well as Sandi Toksvig and a play directed by Kathy Burke. Since then, the festival has grown into one of the largest independent arts festivals in the region.

BBC Birmingham reported that 86,000 people attended the festival in 2009 - the same year Michael McIntyre headlined with a run of shows at the city's National Indoor Arena.

Over the years the festival has attracted some of the biggest names in comedy, including Lenny Henry, Michael McIntyre, Lee Evans, Peter Kay, Jimmy Carr, and Sarah Millican.

Acts from the city and surrounding area are a key focus for the festival, with appearances from such local comics as Joe Lycett, Lenny Henry, Janice Connolly aka Mrs Barbara Nice, Jo Enright, James Cook, Josh Pugh, Jasper Carrott, Eric Rushton, Lindsey Santoro, Hasan Al-Habib and others.

Key venues include The Glee Club, Birmingham Town Hall, Symphony Hall, Birmingham, mac (Birmingham), Old Rep, Old Joint Stock Theatre, Cherry Reds, The Victoria pub, The Electric, Birmingham and comedy clubs around the city.

Regular events include the Birmingham Comedy Festival Breaking Talent Award and the Birmingham Comedy Festival Free Half-Dayers, introduced in 2015 and running across two venues in John Bright Street.

In 2019, the festival won What's On Readers' Awards, for Best Midlands Arts/ Cultural Festival 2019 (covering West Midlands county, Warwickshire, Shropshire, Staffordshire, and Worcestershire) and Best Birmingham Arts Festival 2019. The festival retained both awards in 2020.

Responding to the pandemic, the festival shifted its emphasis to online activities for 2020 with a programme that consisted of "a series of unique interventions and excursions". These included various streamed shows, a radio series, and podcasts. Participants included musician Dan Whitehouse, who created a new soundtrack to Charlie Chaplin's The Vagabond (1916 film), The Nightingales, Laura Lexx, and acclaimed Birmingham street artist Foka Wolf.

== Breaking Talent Award ==
The Birmingham Comedy Festival Breaking Talent Award was introduced in 2014 and is open to new, emerging and early career acts from the West Midlands. Inclusion is by invitation-only and the competition takes place on the first Friday of the festival at The Glee Club. The annual competition aims to recognise and support 'breaking talent' from the region, offering the winner a vital step-up on the comedy career ladder.

Josh Pugh, who won the title in 2015, went on to be crowned English Comedian Of The Year in 2016.

The award was temporarily 'paused' in 2020 (and 2021) due to the COVID-19 pandemic but returned in 2022.

Winners are as follows:

2014: Andrew McBurney

2015: Josh Pugh

2016: Harvey Hawkins

2017: Kai Samra

2018: Laura Monmoth

2019: Celya AB

2020 and 2021: No award due to COVID-19.

2022: Hannah Weetman

2023: Hasan Al-Habib

2024: Tom Towelling

2025: Ryan S Lewis

2026: Eden Voss

The following acts have also been Commended: Good Kids (2018), Mary Flanigan (2019) and Dom Bant (2024).

== Awards and nominations ==
The festival has won five What's On Readers' Awards (voted for by the readers of What's On Magazine, print and online, across the West Midlands, Warwickshire, Worcestershire, Shropshire and Staffordshire).

- 2020: What's On Readers' Awards: Best Midlands Arts/ Cultural Festival + Best Birmingham Arts Festival - Winner (two categories)
- 2019: What's On Readers' Awards: Best Midlands Arts/ Cultural Festival - Winner
- 2019: What's On Readers' Awards: Best Birmingham Arts Festival - Winner
- 2018: What's On Readers' Awards: Best Midlands Arts/ Cultural Festival + Best Birmingham Arts Festival - Shortlisted (two categories)
- 2017: What's On Readers' Awards: Best Midlands Arts Festival - Winner
- 2017: What's On Readers' Awards: Best Festival In Birmingham - Runner Up
- 2016: What's On Readers' Awards: Best Arts Festival - Runner Up

== Key Projects ==
Alongside the main festival, the organisation is also involved in various projects. These include presenting comedy performances at Moseley Folk and Arts Festival since 2019, screening collaborations with the Birmingham branch of the Laurel and Hardy fan club (The Laughing Gravy Tent), and several stage productions.

=== The Goon Show ===
In 2014, the festival company performed a script-in-hand stage adaptation of The Goon Show featuring two scripts by Spike Milligan - The Phantom Head Shaver (of Brighton) and The Canal.

The company revived The Goons in 2017 for a Midlands tour which included two sell-out performances at Midlands Arts Centre, Birmingham. The tour focused on two other Milligan episodes, The House of Teeth and Jet Propelled Guided NAAFI.

The centenary of West Mids-born Goon Show co-writer Larry Stephens was celebrated in 2023 with a performance of two of his co-writes: The Seagoon Memoirs and The Moriarty Murder Mystery (written with Maurice Wiltshire). Among the cast was Talksport presenter Ian Danter. The festival revived their live show in 2026 at a special event in York to mark The Goon Show's 75th anniversary.

=== The Lost Hancocks: Vacant Lot ===
The same year as the second Goon Show run, the company premiered two lost 1950s radio scripts written for Tony Hancock by comedy writer Larry Stephens as The Lost Hancocks: Vacant Lot. The "genteel comedy" was described as "wonderful" by the Express and Star. Further performances have followed, including a sell-out appearance at The British Library in 2018. Among the cast were actress Janice Connolly and impressionist James Hurn.

The festival launched its first podcast during 2020 with The Great Larry Stephens Mystery: Or How A Forgotten Black Country Writer Changed British Comedy Forever!, a mini-audio documentary exploring the life of Larry Stephens and featuring audio recorded live during a Vacant Lot performance.
