= The Impossible Song & Other Songs =

Studio album by Roddy Woomble
- Released: 21 March 2011
- Recorded: An Tobar, Isle of Mull, 2010
- Genre: Folk
- Label: Greenvoe Records
- Producer: Roddy Woomble

Roddy Woomble chronology
Before the Ruin (2008)	The Impossible Song & Other Songs (2011)	Listen to Keep (2012)

The Impossible Song & Other Songs is the third solo album by folk musician and Idlewild vocalist Roddy Woomble, released on 21 March 2011 on Greenvoe Records.

The album's artwork is by author and illustrator Mairi Hedderwick, noted for her series of children's books featuring Katie Morag.

The album entered the UK album chart at #73.

== Background and recording ==
In the spring of 2008, Woomble moved to the Isle of Mull with his wife, Ailidh Lennon. Woomble notes: "We moved to Mull for the space, for the environment, but it's actually been the people that have been so important. My wife has family there. At first I knew no one at all, but the songs I've written have definitely been shaped by the people I've met. Sometimes I think it's odd how these songs came together quite quickly, then I think, well maybe it's not been quick at all, maybe it's taken me 34 years to get here and I just didn't realise it."

The album was recorded over four months at Mull's local arts centre, An Tobar, with Woomble enlisting thirteen musicians to assist in recording. Former Idlewild bassist Gavin Fox appears throughout the album, alongside Phil Cunningham, Lau's Aidan O'Rourke and Michael Marra.

== Track listing ==
All songs written by Woomble/Maclean, unless otherwise noted.

1. "A New Day Has Begun" (Woomble/Maclean/Jones)
2. "Make Something Out of What it's Worth"
3. "Work Like You Can"
4. "Tangled Wire"
5. "Roll Along" (Woomble/Maclean/Jones)
6. "Hour After Hour" (Woomble/Maclean/Jones)
7. "Leaving Without Gold"
8. "New Frontier" (Woomble/Maclean/Jones)
9. "Old Town"
10. "Living as You Always Have"
11. "Gather the Day"
12. "Between the Old Moon"

== Personnel ==
=== Musicians ===
- Roddy Woomble - lead vocals
- Sorren Maclean - acoustic and electric guitars, banjo, organ, backing vocals, vibraphone
- Gavin Fox - bass guitar, accordion
- Gregor Donaldson - drums, percussion, backing vocals
- Jill O'Sullivan - backing vocals
- Gordon Maclean - double bass, accordion ("Work Like You Can")
- Mhairi Hall - piano ("Make Something Out of What it's Worth")
- Kevin Brolly - clarinet ("Make Something Out of What it's Worth")
- Aidan O'Rourke - fiddle ("Work Like You Can", "Hour After Hour")
- Seonaid Aitken - piano ("Tangled Wire"), violin ("Leaving Without Gold"), backing vocals
- Chick Lyall - piano ("Roll Along", "New Frontier", "Between the Old Moon")
- Rob Hall - sopranino, soprano and tenor saxophones ("Roll Along", "Between the Old Moon")
- Michael Marra - organ ("Old Town")
- Phil Cunningham - accordion ("Living as You Always Have")

=== Production personnel ===
- Roddy Woomble - producer
- Gordon Maclean - recording
- Tony Doogan - mixing, additional recording
- Frank Arkwright - mastering

=== Artwork ===
- Mairi Hedderwick - artwork
- Rose Skelton - photo of Roddy
- Darren Evans - layout
