= The Dambuilders =

American indie rock band

- The Dambuilders, 1994. L-R: Eric Masunaga, Dave Derby, Kevin March and Joan Wasser.

Background information
- Origin: Honolulu, Hawaii, United States
- Genre: Indie rock
- Years active: 1989–1997; 2025-present
- Labels: ¡Cuacha!, Elektra
- Past members: Dave Derby; Tryan George; Eric Masunaga; Kevin March; Joan Wasser; Debbie Fox; Stuart Wright

The Dambuilders are an indie rock band that began in Honolulu, Hawaii, USA, in 1989 and later relocated to Boston. They released seven LPs (six studio albums & one compilation) and a number of EPs before breaking up in 1998. The band's current lineup features Dave Derby on bass and vocals, Eric Masunaga on guitar, Kevin March on drums, Sean Eden (Luna) on guitar, and Claudia Chopek (Dexys) on violin.

== History ==
The Dambuilders was a band in the early 1990s Boston rock scene. The founding members—Dave Derby, Tryan George and Eric Masunaga, all from Hawaii—had played in a number of bands (such as the Exactones) before moving to Boston in 1990. The band began as the Dambuilders in Hawaii in a three-piece and four-piece configuration. Early violin was provided by Debbie Fox. With Fox's involvement, nearly all of the band's songs had electric violin tracks. Around 1992, the "classic line-up" consisted of Derby (bass guitar and lead vocals), Masunaga (guitar), Kevin March (drums) and Joan Wasser (violin). Many of the band's early recordings were engineered by Masunaga.

Their final studio album, Against the Stars, was released in 1997 by Elektra Records.

The band toured with Lush, Weezer, Jeff Buckley, Better Than Ezra and others in North America, Europe and Australia.

== Musical style and legacy ==
While the Dambuilders are generally considered an "indie" band, they received some commercial airplay with the single "Shrine" from their 1994 East West Records release Encendedor. The song tells of a cross-cultural romantic courtship between the singer and a girl who "doesn't speak much English" but is familiar with the American music scene. In the song, the singer is willing to conform to traditional religious practices outside his own cultural sphere ("...if I stay with her I'll lose track of all time, so I light a candle to the shrine..."), but seemingly manages to stay true to his roots by redefining the acts as an aspect of his own non-religious, culturally inclusive belief system ("...and call it Rock n' Roll"). "Shrine" was ranked No. 17 in MTV's 100 Greatest Songs of the '90s: Lollapalooza list.

== Other projects ==
Derby later assembled Gramercy Arms, a "revolving collective of musicians and artists". Both Wasser and March have contributed, with Wasser appearing on both of their albums, including a vocal duet with Lloyd Cole on the band's "Beautiful Disguise" single and video. The band has also featured Cole, Sean Eden (Luna), Rainy Orteca (Dead Air, Joan as Police Woman, Lloyd Cole), Hilken Mancini (The Count Me Outs, Fuzzy, Colburn-Mancini) and Sandy Smallens (Too Much Joy), as well as guest performances by Doug Gillard (Guided By Voices), Matthew Caws (Nada Surf), Renee LoBue (Elk City) and Chris Brokaw (Come, Codeine). They are scheduled to release their fourth album in early 2024. Derby's other output includes two releases under the "Brilliantine" name, as well as two solo albums: Even Further Behind (2003) and Dave Derby and the Norfolk Downs (2007).

Wasser began performing under the name Joan as Police Woman, releasing her first self-titled solo EP in June 2005. She released a full-length album, entitled Real Life, in June 2006, followed by To Survive (2008), Cover (2009), The Deep Field (2011), The Classic (2014), Let It Be You (2016), with Benjamin Lazar Davis, Damned Devotion (2018), Joanthology (2019), Cover Two (2020) and The Solution Is Restless (2021), with Tony Allen and Dave Okumu.

March was also a member of Guided by Voices for several years and continues to do session work and tour with various artists. In 2005, he formed Hot One with his old friend Nathan Larson of Shudder to Think, releasing one self-titled album in 2006.

Masunaga now runs Modulus Studios, a mastering and DVD authoring studio, in Boston.

== Future Plans: Reunions, Documentary & Upcoming Shows ==
In addition to the Dambuilders reunion at Drom Fest, original members of the "Young Person's Guide" era Dambuilders performed with Dave Derby and friends at NYC Berlin in November of 2025 to perform their 1989 debut album in its entirety for the first time ever. Consisting of original members, Tryan George, Daniel Glass, and Deb Fox, the band was joined by longtime musical collaborators Sandy Smallens, Carl Baggaley, Mike Potenza, and Alex Emanuel.

The performance was recorded as part of an upcoming documentary on the band's early years, tentatively titled "I Used to Be Different," directed by Bruno Corbo and Zeke Bowman.

The new lineup released two songs on Magic Door Records in April 2026: "Shrine" 2026, a re-recording of their 1994 classic "Shrine," as well as a new song, "https://thedambuilders.bandcamp.com/track/i-hope-were-not-too-late." Working with director Bruno Corbo, the band released a video for "Shrine 2026" that interweaves footage from the original video directed by Tryan George, with new scenes featuring Joan Wasser, Daniel Glass, Alex Emanuel, and Colin Burns, who has created artwork and design for the band over the years.

The band played its first live shows in 30 years in both New York City and Providence, Rhode Island, to support the release. The band is planning more recordings and live shows to come.

== Discography ==
=== Studio albums ===
- 1989: A Young Person's Guide (¡Cuacha!)
- 1991: Geek Lust (¡Cuacha!)
- 1993: Islington Porn Tapes (¡Cuacha!)
- 1994: Encendedor (Elektra)
- 1995: Ruby Red (Elektra)
- 1997: Against the Stars (Elektra)

=== Compilations ===
- 1996: God Dambuilders Bless America (Elektra)

=== Singles ===
| Release date | Title | Chart Positions |
| Release date | Title | US Modern Rock |
| 1991 | "Pop Song = Food" | |
| 1992 | "Smell" | |
| 1993 | "New Jersey" | |
| 1994 | "Shrine" | 13 |
| 1995 | "Teenage Loser Anthem" | |

=== Extended plays ===
- 1993: Tough Guy Problem (spinART)

=== Digital Singles ===
- 2026: Shrine 2026/I Hope We're Not Too Late (Magic Door)

=== Videos ===
- Burn This Bridge
- Teenage Loser Anthem
- Smell
- Shrine
- Shrine 2026
