= To Survive =

Studio album by Joan as Police Woman
- Released: June 9, 2008
- Length: 45:23
- Labels: Reveal Records (UK), Cheap Lullaby (United States), PIAS (EU)
- Producer: Joan Wasser

Joan as Police Woman chronology
Real Life (2006)	To Survive (2008)	Cover (2009)

Professional ratings
Review scores
Source	Rating
AllMusic	4/5 stars
Drowned in Sound	8/10
musicOMH	4/5 stars
Pitchfork	5.7/10
Q	p 112, June 2008

To Survive is the second studio album by Joan as Police Woman. It was released on June 9, 2008, on CD, LP and digital download.

The album was released by Reveal Records in the United Kingdom, by Cheap Lullaby in the United States, and by PIAS in Europe and the rest of the world.

In 2009, it was awarded a silver certification from the Independent Music Companies Association, which indicated sales of at least 30,000 copies throughout Europe.

== Reception ==
The album received generally favorable reviews, earning a metascore of 76 on Metacritic. It was an Editor's Pick in the July 2008 issue of Paste, and ranked at #43 in Q's 50 Best Albums of the Year.

In its positive review, Spin wrote: "Stepping away from the ivories, Wasser wanders into a patch of violin tangles and glitchy twitters ('Holiday'), gets soulful support from horns ('Magpies'), and builds a song out of a Robert Frippish guitar lick, sustained synth chords, stark percussion, and a backup choir consisting only of herself ('Start of My Heart')."

"She addresses the dark stuff in relationships," enthused actress Juliette Lewis. "'To Be Lonely' is a very honest examination of the self, and 'Honor Wishes' will make sense to all of us who have loved a little too hard."

== Track listing ==
1. "Honor Wishes" (featuring David Sylvian)
2. "Holiday"
3. "To Be Loved"
4. "To Be Lonely"
5. "Magpies"
6. "Start of My Heart"
7. "Hard White Wall"
8. "Furious"
9. "To Survive"
10. "To America" (featuring Rufus Wainwright)

The Japanese version of To Survive includes three bonus tracks:

1. "No Question" (featuring David Sylvian)
2. "Take Me"
3. "Radish (To Be Free)"

== Personnel ==
Adapted from CD liner notes

- Joan Wasser - Piano (1–5, 8–10), vocals (all), acoustic guitar (7, 10), electric guitar (2, 5, 7, 10), strings (2), harmony vocals (1–3, 6, 8), synthesizer (6–8), wurlitzer (3, 6, 8), organ (7, 8), farfisa (8), tambourine (8), claps
- Rainy Orteca - Bass, harmony vocals, acoustic guitar
- Parker Kindred - Drums, rolls, tambourines, finger cymbals, harmony vocals, shaker, percussion, rhythm ace, claps
- Ben Perowsky - Drums, rhythm ace, harmony vocals
- Adam Sachs - Tambourine, sandpaper, drums, percussion
- Ed Pastorini - Keyboard, electric guitar, organ
- Timo Ellis - Electric guitar
- Nathan Larson - Electric guitar, harmony vocals
- Doug Wieselman - Horn arrangement, baritone sax, bass clarinet
- Peck Allmond - Mellophone, trumpet
- Erik Lawrence - Alto flute, alto sax
- Maxim Moston - String arrangement, violin
- Danielle Farina - Viola
- Theo Zimmerman - Cello
- David Sylvian - Voice (1, 11)
- Rufus Wainwright - Voice (10)
