= Let It Be You (album) =

Studio album by Joan As Police Woman and Benjamin Lazar Davis
- Released: October 21, 2016
- Genres: Rock; pop; R&B
- Length: 36:56
- Label: Reveal
- Producers: Joan Wasser; Benjamin Lazar Davis

Joan As Police Woman chronology
| The Classic (2014) | Let It Be You (2016) | Damned Devotion (2018) |

Professional ratings
Aggregate scores
| Source | Rating |
|---|---|
| Metacritic | 65/100 |
Review scores
| Source | Rating |
| AllMusic | 3.5/5 stars |
| Clash | 6/10 |
| DIY | 2/5 stars |
| Drowned in Sound | 7/10 |
| The Guardian | 3/5 stars |
| MusicOMH | 3.5/5 stars |
| Pitchfork | 6,9/10 |

Let It Be You is a collaborative studio album by Joan As Police Woman and Benjamin Lazar Davis, released on October 21, 2016 by Reveal Records. The release was preceded by the single "Broke Me in Two". Music videos were released for "Broke Me in Two" and "Overloaded", both featuring comedian Fred Armisen. The duo followed the release by a UK tour.

== Critical reception ==
Let It Be You received mixed reviews, with DIY noting it as a "curiously unbalanced album", while AllMusic described it as "a collection of appealingly loose, lush songs full of creativity". At Metacritic, which assigns a weighted average rating out of 100 to reviews from mainstream publications, this release received an average score of 65 based on 12 reviews.

== Track listing ==
All tracks are written by Joan Wasser and Benjamin Lazar Davis, except where noted.

Let It Be You track listing
| No. | Title | Writer(s) | Length |
|---|---|---|---|
| 1. | "Broke Me in Two" | | 2:55 |
| 2. | "Overloaded" | | 3:25 |
| 3. | "Magic Lamp" | Joan Wasser, Benjamin Lazar Davis & Tim Davis | 3:24 |
| 4. | "Let It Be You" | | 2:57 |
| 5. | "Hurts So Bad" | | 3:45 |
| 6. | "Satellite" | | 3:44 |
| 7. | "Easy Money" | | 3:22 |
| 8. | "Violent Dove" | | 3:43 |
| 9. | "Motorway" | | 3:34 |
| 10. | "Station" | | 6:11 |
| Total length: | | | 36:56 |

== Personnel ==
Musicians

- Ian Chang – drums
- Ryan Dugre – guitar
- Benjamin Lazar Davis – vocals, bass, keys, programming
- Joan Wasser – vocals, strings, guitar, keys

Production

- Joan Wasser & Benjamin Lazar Davis – producers
- Luke Moellman – mixing, additional production
- Chris Gehringer – mastering
- Adam Sachs – engineer

== Charts ==
Chart performance for Let It Be You
| Chart (2018) | Peak position |
|---|---|
| Belgian Albums (Ultratop Flanders) | 119 |
