= Ruby red (disambiguation) =

Ruby red is a color

The term may also refer to

- RAL 3003 Ruby red, a RAL color
- Ruby Red (The Love Language album), 2013
- Ruby Red (Dambuilders album), 1995
- "Ruby Red" (song), by Slade, 1992
- Ruby Red, the first book of the Ruby Red Trilogy by Kerstin Gier
- Ruby Red (film), a 2013 film based on the first book of the Ruby Red Trilogy
- Ruby Red grapefruit
- North Devon cattle
