= Damned Devotion =

Studio album by Joan As Police Woman
- Released: February 9, 2018
- Length: 43:06
- Label: PIAS
- Producer: Joan Wasser; Thomas Bartlett

Joan As Police Woman chronology
Let It Be You (2016)	Damned Devotion (2018)	Cover Two (2020)

Professional ratings
Aggregate scores
Source	Rating
Metacritic	81/100
Review scores
Source	Rating
AllMusic	4/5 stars
Drowned in Sound	7/10
The Line of Best Fit	8/10
MusicOMH	3/5 stars
The Observer	4/5 stars

Damned Devotion is the fifth studio album by American musician Joan As Police Woman, released on February 9, 2018 by PIAS Recordings.

== Release ==
On November 2, 2017, Wasser announced the release of her new album, along with the single "Warning Bell".

== Critical reception ==
Damned Devotion was met with "universal acclaim" reviews from critics. At Metacritic, which assigns a weighted average rating out of 100 to reviews from mainstream publications, this release received an average score of 81 based on 11 reviews. Aggregator Album of the Year gave the release a 76 out of 100 based on a critical consensus of 12 reviews.

== Track listing ==
All tracks are written by Joan Wasser, except "Steed", "The Silence" and "Talk About It Later", which are co-credited to Parker Kindred.

Side A
No.	Title	Length
1.	"Wonderful"	3:33
2.	"Warning Bell"	3:16
3.	"Tell Me"	3:37
4.	"Steed (For Jean Genet)"	4:07
5.	"Damned Devotion"	3:12
6.	"The Silence"	4:42

Side B
No.	Title	Length
7.	"Valid Jagger"	3:27
8.	"Rely On"	2:42
9.	"What Was It Like"	4:11
10.	"Talk About It Later"	2:35
11.	"Silly Me"	3:38
12.	"I Don't Mind"	4:06
Total length:		43:06

== Personnel ==
Credits are adapted from the Damned Devotion liner notes.

Musicians

- Joan Wasser – lead vocals, guitar, drums, producer
- Oren Bloedow – guitar
- Parker Kindred – drums
- Benjamin Lazar Davis – bass, guitar
- Jared Samuel – keyboards

Production

- Thomas Bartlett – engineer, producer
- Dan Millice – mastering
- Luke Moellman – mixing
- Adam Sachs – engineer

== Charts ==
Chart (2018)	Peak position
Austrian Albums (Ö3 Austria)	72
Belgian Albums (Ultratop Flanders)	36
Dutch Albums (Album Top 100)	84
German Albums (Offizielle Top 100)	78
Swiss Albums (Schweizer Hitparade)	47
UK Albums (OCC)	57
