= Arc Light (album) =

Studio album by Lau
- Released: March 30, 2009
- Recorded: Castle Sound, Pencaitland, Scotland, December 2008, Heriot Toun Studio
- Genre: Folk
- Label: Navigator Records
- Producer: Calum Malcolm

Lau chronology
Live (2008)	Arc Light (2009)

Professional ratings
Review scores
Source	Rating
Allmusic	4/5 stars
BBC	positive
The Guardian	4/5 stars
The Line of Best Fit	(85%)

Arc Light is the second studio album by contemporary folk three-piece Lau, released on March 30, 2009 on Navigator Records.

The album's bonus track is a cover of The Beatles' song, "Dear Prudence". The track originally appeared on a compilation issued free with Mojo magazine.

== Reception ==
Like its predecessor, Lightweights and Gentlemen, Arc Light garnered strong critical acclaim upon release. Chris Nickson of Allmusic described the album as "stirring and utterly wonderful," while Michael Quinn, of BBC Music remarked that "what astonishes most about Lau is the orchestral quality of the sound." Music webzine The Line of Best Fit stated that: "Arc Light is testament to their constant need to push themselves as musicians, and as innovators of the folk movement."

== Track listing ==
All tracks arranged by Kris Drever, Martin Green and Aidan O'Rourke

1. "The Burrian" (Drever/Green/O'Rourke)
2. "Winter Moon" (Drever/Green/O'Rourke)
3. "Horizontigo"
  - "Horizontigo" (Drever)
  - "Alright in the Heid" (Green)
4. "Salty Boys"
  - "Operation Knoydart (O'Rourke)
  - "Salty Boys" (Drever)
5. "Banks of Marble" (Les Rice/Drever/Green/O'Rourke)
6. "Stephen's"
  - "Stephen's Leaving" (Green)
  - "Plot No.12" (O'Rourke)
7. "The Master" (Drever/Green/O'Rourke)
8. "Frank and Flo's"
  - "Frank and Flo's" (Green)
  - "An Tobar" (O'Rourke)
9. "Temple of Fiddes" (Drever/O'Rourke)

=== Bonus track ===
- "Dear Prudence" (John Lennon/Paul McCartney)

== Personnel ==
The following people contributed to Arc Light

=== Band ===
- Kris Drever – guitar, vocals
- Martin Green – accordion
- Aidan O'Rourke – fiddle

=== Additional musicians ===
- Stuart Nisbet – pedal steel guitar
- Corrina Hewat – backing vocals
- Karine Polwart – backing vocals
- Inge Thomson – backing vocals

=== Recording personnel ===
- Calum Malcolm – producer, mixing, mastering
- Lau (band) – mixing
- Stuart Hamilton – engineering

=== Artwork ===
- David Angel – photography
