= Real Life (Joan as Police Woman album) =

Studio album by Joan as Police Woman
- Released: June 12, 2006
- Genre: Jazz, pop rock
- Length: 38:14; Bonus disc: 15:25
- Label: Reveal Records (United Kingdom)
- Producer: Joan Wasser

Joan as Police Woman chronology
Real Life (2006)	To Survive (2008)

Professional ratings
Review scores
Source	Rating
AllMusic	4.5/5 stars
Entertainment Weekly	B+
The Guardian	4/5 stars
musicOMH	4/5 stars
Pitchfork Media	8.1/10
Rolling Stone	2.5/5 stars
Spin	7/10
Stylus Magazine	B+
Tiny Mix Tapes	3/5 stars

Real Life is the debut studio album by Joan As Police Woman (Joan Wasser), released by Reveal Records in the United Kingdom on June 12, 2006, and a year later in the United States on June 12, 2007.

In addition to the standard jewel-case release, it was released in a limited-edition digipak with Wasser art card and as a 2-disc expanded edition.

"I Defy" was co-written by the Antony and the Johnsons' singer Antony Hegarty, who also contributed vocals to the track. In September 2006, she performed a live-session at the BBC.

The album has received much critical acclaim, being variously described as "splendidly slinky", "a magical journey", and "a fine showcase". In her review in The Guardian, Caroline Sullivan described the album as "pensive and gentle; sometimes stately of tempo, sometimes slightly breathless, but always erring on the side of lovely understatement."

In early 2008, Real Life won in the 7th Annual Independent Music Awards for Best Pop/Rock Album.

It was awarded a silver certification from the Independent Music Companies Association which indicated sales of at least 30,000 copies throughout Europe.

== Track listing ==
All compositions by Joan Wasser except as indicated.

1. "Real Life" – 4:38
2. "Eternal Flame" – 3:39
3. "Feed the Light" – 3:41
4. "The Ride" – 3:09
5. "I Defy" (Anohni Hegarty, Wasser) – 3:32
6. "Flushed Chest" – 3:55
7. "Christobel" – 3:06
8. "Save Me" – 3:44
9. "Anyone" – 4:50
10. "We Don't Own It" – 3:55

The 2-CD edition had the additional tracks:

1. "Show Me the Life" – 2:32
2. "Broken Eyes" – 2:48
3. "Sweet Thing" (David Bowie) – 3:13
4. "Happiness Is a Violator (For Condoleezza Rice)" – 1:53
5. "Endless Supply of Poison" – 0:52
6. "We Don't Own It" – 4:04

== Musicians ==
Joan As Police Woman:

- Joan Wasser – vocals, piano, guitar, violin, viola, bass guitar, strings, wurlitzer, keyboards
- Rainy Orteca – bass guitar, vocals
- Ben Perowsky – drums, percussion, vocals, tambourine

with:

- Jeff Hill – cello, bass guitar
- Joseph Arthur – vocals, keyboards, piano, drums
- Antony Hegarty – vocals
- Doug Wieselman – bass clarinet, tenor saxophone, clarinet
- Steven Bernstein – trumpet
- Briggan Krauss – baritone saxophone
- Charles Burnham – vocals
