= Encendedor =

Studio album by the Dambuilders
- Released: 1994
- Genre: Rock
- Length: 39:14
- Label: East West
- Producer: Eric Masunaga; the Dambuilders

The Dambuilders chronology
Islington Porn Tapes (1993)	Encendedor (1994)	Ruby Red (1995)

Encendedor is an album by the American band the Dambuilders, released in 1994. Its title comes from the Spanish word for cigarette lighter. The band supported the album with a North American tour and an appearance on Late Night with Conan O'Brien. "Smell" was released as a single, with the narrative of the accompanying music video based on the Chappaquiddick incident. Another single, "Shrine", was a modest Modern Rock chart success. The album was nominated for a Boston Music Award for "Debut Album of the Year".

== Production ==
The album was produced by the Dambuilders' guitarist, Eric Masunaga, with assistance from the rest of the band. All four members contributed to the songwriting, although most of the tracks are rerecorded versions of older songs. Joan Wasser's violin served as the rhythm guitar on some tracks; on others it was processed or run through effects. Several songs incorporate screaming vocals. Some songs touch on the band's roots in Hawaii: "Slo-Mo Kikaida" refers to the 1970s adaptation of Kikaider; "Kill Haole Day" is about the practice of hazing Caucasian students at the end of the Hawaiian school year. "Shrine" is about a man who pines for a woman who loves L7. "Idaho" and "Delaware" were among the 20 songs the band had written about states in the US.

== Critical reception ==
Professional ratings
Review scores
Source	Rating
Robert Christgau	(3-star Honorable Mention)

The Washington Post noted that the Dambuilders "don't have a groove to hold their fragmentary compositions together; the album provides gusts of appealing songcraft, but is frequently becalmed between them." The Record said that on half the album "the jagged-edge arrangements and surprising violin flourishes come off as unsuccessful attempts to divert attention from David Derby's dry vocals and the Dambuilders' lacklustre songwriting." Rolling Stone stated that "the quartet creates a clash of melodic bass, edgy violin, dashing guitar and shifting drums that suggests a more rustic version of the Pixies."

The Wisconsin State Journal called the album "a pulsating, often dazzling concoction, its songs both urgent and accessible." Robert Christgau praised "Idaho" and "Copsucker" and said that the album's music was punk rock, while its song structures represented art rock sensibilities. Spin said that "Wasser's wailing, symphonic swaths are all over... She's painterly and prickly". The Daily Press included Encendedor on its list of the best albums of 1994, calling the Dambuilders "the new rock band of the year." The Boston Herald considered Encendedor to be the second best "local" rock album of the year.

== Track listing ==
Encendedor track listing
No.	Title	Length
1.	"Copsucker"	2:41
2.	"Smell"	3:52
3.	"Kill Haole Day"	3:38
4.	"Slo-Mo Kikaida"	4:53
5.	"Idaho"	2:57
6.	"Colin's Heroes"	4:12
7.	"Collective"	4:43
8.	"Shrine"	2:56
9.	"Delaware"	4:46
10.	"Fur"	4:36
Total length:		39:14
