= The Deep Field =

Studio album by Joan as Police Woman
- Released: January 24, 2011
- Recorded: 2010
- Length: 55:35
- Label: Reveal
- Producer: Joan Wasser

Joan as Police Woman chronology
Cover (2009)	The Deep Field (2011)	The Classic (2014)

Singles from The Deep Field
- 1. "The Magic" Released: January 18, 2011; 2. "Nervous" Released: April 10, 2011; 3. "Chemmie" Released: Promo Only

Professional ratings
Review scores
Source	Rating
AllMusic	3.5/5 stars
Consequence of Sound	C−
Drowned in Sound	8/10

The Deep Field is the third studio album by Joan as Police Woman, released in 2011.

== Critical reception ==
The album has received positive reviews from critics. At Metacritic, which assigns a normalised rating out of 100 to reviews from mainstream critics, the album received an average score of 70, based on 14 reviews, which indicates "generally favorable reviews".

In a positive review, Q magazine stated, "There is slick virtuosity to all the playing here but it is her warm, witty presence that shines through." James Skinner, in his 8/10 review for BBC Music says "...there is something fantastically indulgent and heartening going on here: the sense that Wasser is embracing her peculiarities and making giddy, ebullient light of them. Long may she continue to do so." Andy Gill, from The Independent called it "everything the Adele album lacks: real emotional insight, couched in genuinely soulful arrangements bristling with imagination." However, Michael Cragg's review for The Guardian was mixed, saying, "Wasser's featherlight voice suits the slower songs, it has a tendency to sound slightly one-dimensional on the over-fussy bigger numbers, and there are moments when it drifts too close to polite MOR." In a negative review, David Raposa for Pitchfork Media criticized the overall sound of the album stating, "While she aims for such critically acclaimed heights, her shots often land in a middle-of-the-road, adult-contemporary wasteland."

== Track listing ==
No.	Title	Length
1.	"Nervous"	6:02
2.	"The Magic"	4:10
3.	"The Action Man"	5:08
4.	"Flash"	7:52
5.	"Run For Love"	5:38
6.	"Human Condition"	5:33
7.	"Kiss the Specifics"	4:30
8.	"Chemmie"	4:47
9.	"Forever and a Year"	5:56
10.	"I Was Everyone"	6:02
Total length:		55:35

UK iTunes & North American bonus track
No.	Title	Length
11.	"Say Yes"	3:47

Vinyl edition bonus tracks
No.	Title	Length
11.	"It's Possible"
12.	"Human Condition" (solo)
