= Lightweights and Gentlemen =

Studio album by Lau
- Released: March 19, 2007
- Recorded: Castle Sound, Pencaitland, Scotland, December 2006
- Genre: Folk
- Label: Reveal Records
- Producer: Calum Malcolm

Lau chronology
Lightweights and Gentlemen (2007)	Live (2008)

Professional ratings
Review scores
Source	Rating
Allmusic	link

Lightweights and Gentlemen is the debut studio album by folk band Lau, released on March 19, 2007.

== Track listing ==
All tracks arranged by Kris Drever, Martin Green and Aidan O'Rourke

1. "Hinba" - 5:07
  - "Hinba" (O'Rourke)
  - "Funny Weather" (Green)
2. "Butcher Boy" - 4:07 (trad. additional words/music by Drever)
3. "The Jigs" - 4:50
  - "Mattie and Karine's" (O'Rourke)
  - "The Lau Jig" (Drever, Green, O'Rourke)
  - "The Creche Jig" (Joe Scurfield)
4. "Results" - 4:39
  - "Come on wee man!" (Green)
  - "Waiting for the Results" (Drever)
5. "Unquiet Grave" - 5:13 (music - Drever, words - trad.)
6. "Souter Creek" - 6:19
  - "The Dog and the Rabbit" (Drever)
  - "A Dog Called Bran" (O'Rourke)
  - "Souter Creek" (O'Rourke)
7. "Kris's" - 6:28
  - "Alyth's" (O'Rourke)
  - "Muckle Moose on the Muin" (Drever)
8. "Freeborn Man" - 3:42 (Ewan MacColl)
9. "Moorhens" - 4:15
  - "The Moorhens" (Drever)
  - "Rick Taylor's" (Green)
  - "A Tune for Emily Ball (O'Rourke)
10. "Gallowhill" - 6:04 (O'Rourke)

=== Bonus Track ===
- "Twa Stewarts" (Green) - 7:34
  - "Auld Stewart
  - "Young Stewart"
  - "Last Weeks Efforts"

== Personnel ==
- Kris Drever - guitar, e-bowed dobro guitar, vocals, mixing
- Martin Green - piano-keyed accordion, accordion through Leslie speaker, mixing
- Aidan O'Rourke - fiddle, mixing
- Stuart Hamilton - engineering
- Calum Malcolm - producer, mixing
- Hugo Morris - photography
- Chris Williams - design and layout
