= Celya AB =

French writer and comedian

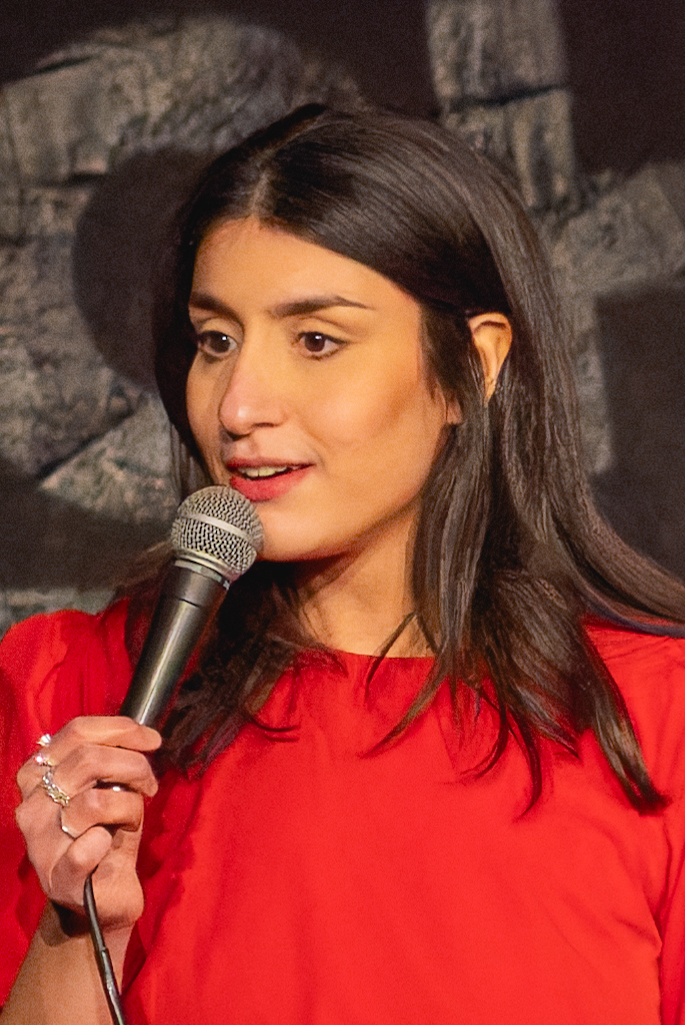
- Born: September 8, 1995 (age 30)
- Occupation: Comedian
- Website: celya-ab.com

Celya AB (born 8 September 1995) is a French stand-up comedian, writer and actress based in England. She won the Best Newcomer Chortle Award in 2022.

== Biography ==
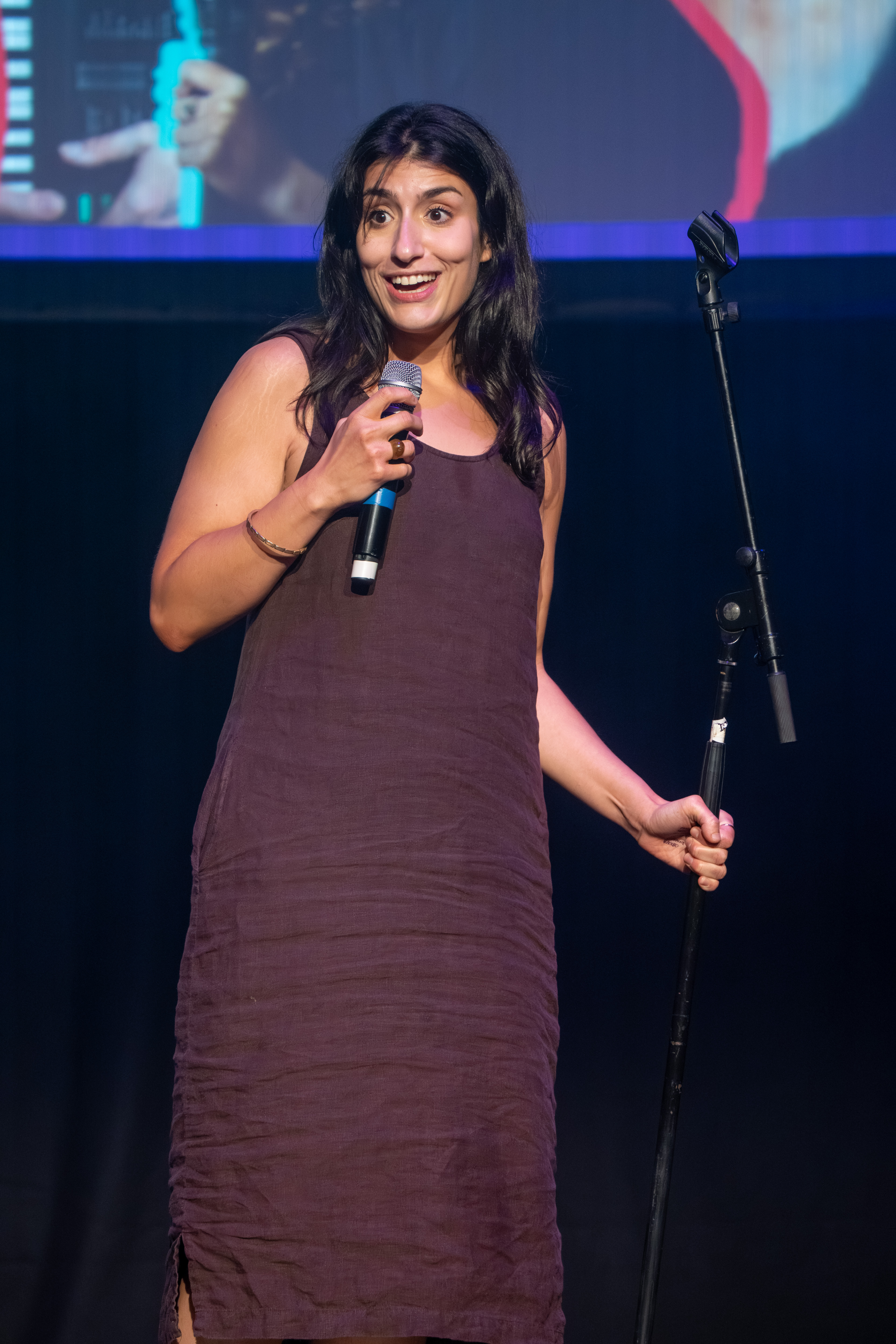
Celya AB at the 2025 Edinburgh Festival Fringe

Celya AB was born and brought up in Paris in a French-Algerian family. Her family lived in the suburb of Seine-Saint-Denis. She moved to Birmingham in 2014.

She discovered stand-up on a trip back to Paris and did her first gig in Birmingham. She made her stand-up debut at Sutton Coldfield's Comedy Junction in early 2017, encouraged by local comedian Karen Bayley.

In 2019 she won the Birmingham Comedy Festival Breaking Talent Award, and was a finalist at the Funny Women awards.

In 2022 she won the Best Newcomer Award from Chortle. She has appeared on BBC One as a finalist in the BBC's New Comedy Award 2021, which was won by Welsh comedian Anna Thomas.

Due to the COVID-19 pandemic she did not make her debut at the Edinburgh Festival Fringe until August 2022 with her show Swimming. In 2023 she performed the show Second Rodeo and in 2024 - Of All People.

In March 2026, Celya AB was confirmed to be part of the writing team for the first series of Saturday Night Live UK.

== Comedy style ==
Celya AB has cited Dylan Moran and American actress and comedian Maria Bamford, as well as French trio Les Inconnus and the late humourist Pierre Desproges, as formative influences.
