= Honk Toot Suite =

Studio album by Éamonn Coyne and Kris Drever
- Released: January 29, 2007
- Recorded: Zwa Studios, Edinburgh, Scotland
- Genre: Folk
- Label: Compass
- Producer: Éamonn Coyne, Kris Drever

Kris Drever chronology
Black Water (2006)	Honk Toot Suite (2007)	Before the Ruin (2008)

Honk Toot Suite is a studio album by contemporary folk musicians Éamonn Coyne and Kris Drever, released on January 27, 2007 on Compass Records.

The album's liner notes state that: "On this recording we wanted to explore some of the different types of music that influence our playing and tickle our fancy. As well as recording traditional music of various countries we wanted to record some self-penned and some newly written tunes.

"The Viking's Bride" is written by Kris Drever's father, Ivan Drever.

== Track listing ==
1. "House Jigs"
  - "Liam Doyle's"
  - "The Rolling Waves"
  - "Cailin an Ti Mhoir"
2. "Lucy's Swamp"
  - "Lucy Farr's"
  - "Down in the Swamp" (Bela Fleck)
3. "The Peninsula Set"
  - "Ger the Rigger"
  - "An Dro"
  - "The Peninsula Man" (Simon Bradley)
4. "The Viking's Bride" (Ivan Drever)
5. "Lakeside Barndances"
  - "Eddie Duffy's
  - "The Stack of Oats"
  - "Eddie Duffy's
6. "Roscommon Reels"
  - "Johnny Doherty"
  - "Hughie's Cap" (Ed Reevey)
  - "Roscommon Reel"
7. "Walking in the Dew"
8. "Glencoe to Gort"
  - "The Lament of Glencoe"
  - "Cooley's Jig"
  - "Toss the Feathers"
9. "Cock-a-Doodle"
10. "Twenty Quid"
  - "Paddy Fahey's"
  - "Pretty Girls of Mayo"
  - "Sean Reid's"
11. "Honk Toot Sweet"
  - "Tout Sweet" (Coyne)
  - "Honk Toot" (Drever/Ian Carr)

== Personnel ==
- Kris Drever - guitar, vocals ("The Viking's Bride", "Walking in the Dew" and "Cock-a-Doodle"), producer
- Éamonn Coyne - banjo, tenor guitar, mandolin, producer, cover design
- Erik Laughton - bodhran ("House Jigs", "Lakeside Barndances", "Roscommon Reels, "Cock-a-Doodle" and "Honk Toot Sweet")
- John Joe Kelly - bodhran ("Lucy's Swamp" and "Glencoe to Gort")
- Manitoba McGillicuddy Barbershop Three - vocals ("Lakeside Barndances")
- Koos Koos McAfferty - button accordion
- Peter Rawson - mixing, pre-mastering
- Randy Leroy - mastering
- Louis DeCarlo - photography
