= Cover Two =

Studio album by Joan As Police Woman
- Released: May 1, 2020
- Length: 44:44
- Label: PIAS

Joan As Police Woman chronology
Damned Devotion (2018)	Cover Two (2020)

Professional ratings
Aggregate scores
Source	Rating
Metacritic	78/100
Review scores
Source	Rating
AllMusic	3.5/5 stars
MusicOMH	4/5 stars

Cover Two is a studio album of cover versions by American musician Joan As Police Woman. It was released on May 1, 2020, under PIAS Recordings. The album is Joan's second album of cover versions, and is titled as a sequel to Cover (2009). The album cover itself is an homage to Canadian band Loverboy's 1981 album Get Lucky.

== Critical reception ==
Cover Two was met with generally favorable reviews from critics. At Metacritic, which assigns a weighted average rating out of 100 to reviews from mainstream publications, this release received an average score of 78, based on 5 reviews.

== Track listing ==
Cover Two track listing
No.	Title	Original artist	Length
1.	"Kiss"	Prince	5:10
2.	"Spread" (featuring Meshell Ndegeocello)	Outkast	4:21
3.	"Under Control"	The Strokes	3:41
4.	"Not the Way"	Cass McCombs	3:48
5.	"I Keep Forgettin' (Every Time You're Near)"	Michael McDonald	5:25
6.	"Life's What You Make It"	Talk Talk	6:00
7.	"Out of Time"	Blur	2:24
8.	"On The Beach"	Neil Young	6:28
9.	"There Are Worse Things I Could Do"	Warren Casey; Jim Jacobs	2:52
10.	"Running"	Gil Scott-Heron	4:25
