= Before the Ruin =

Studio album by Kris Drever, Roddy Woomble and John McCusker
- Released: 15 September 2008
- Recorded: 2007
- Genre: Folk
- Label: Navigator
- Producer: John McCusker; Andy Seward

Roddy Woomble chronology
My Secret Is My Silence (2006)	Before the Ruin (2008)	The Impossible Song & Other Songs (2011)

Kris Drever chronology
Honk Toot Suite (2007)	Before the Ruin (2008)	Mark the Hard Earth (2010)

Professional ratings
Review scores
Source	Rating
The Line of Best Fit	(69%) link
Playlouder	link
The Skinny	link
God is in the TV	link

Before the Ruin is a collaborative studio album by Scottish folk musicians Kris Drever, John McCusker and Roddy Woomble, released on 15 September 2008 through Navigator Records. The album entered the UK Albums Chart at #156 and the Scottish Albums chart at #45. The album was originally scheduled for a May release, but was delayed due to McCusker touring with Mark Knopfler.

The album features appearances from Radiohead drummer Phil Selway, and Teenage Fanclub's Norman Blake.

"Silver and Gold" was released as a single on 1 September 2008.

Speaking of the album, McCusker notes that their "paths had all crossed in various ways over the past few years - working with Kate Rusby, and on Kris and Roddy's solo albums - and our starting-point was basically just that we all really liked each other's stuff." Woomble notes that: "Kris and John each have such a different take on things like melody and lyrics, but we’re all working equally on the songs together, so the whole thing feels totally new. And it’s great getting to make another ‘first’ album at our age."

== Artwork ==
The album cover is by Orcadian painter Charles Shearer, and is said to "describe the physical, and metaphorical pull of the ocean, which is also a main theme of the record."

== Track listing ==
All songs written by Kris Drever, John McCusker and Roddy Woomble

1. "Silver and Gold" – 4:37
2. "Into the Blue" – 4:27
3. "All Along the Way" – 4:41
4. "Before the Ruin" – 4:08
5. "Hope to See" – 5:05
6. "Rest on the Rock" – 3:38
7. "Out of Light" – 4:09
8. "The Poorest Company" – 4:40
9. "Moments Last Forever" – 4:35
10. "Stuck in Time" – 5:00

== Personnel ==
- Kris Drever - electric and acoustic guitars, vocals
- John McCusker - fiddle, cittern, tenor guitar, wurlitzer ("Stuck in Time"), producer
- Roddy Woomble - vocals
- Andy Seward - bass (1, 3, 4 & 10), producer, engineer, mixing
- Francis MacDonald - drums (1, 2, 3, 4, 9 & 10)
- Ewen Vernal - bass (2, 5, 6, 7 & 9)
- Michael McGoldrick - whistle ("Silver and Gold", "Out of Light"), pipes ("Before the Ruin"), flute ("Hope to See")
- Donald Shaw - harmonium and wurlitzer (2, 6, 7, 9 & 10)
- Heidi Talbot - vocals (2, 3, 4, 6, 8 & 9)
- Norman Blake - vocals (2, 5 & 8)
- Phil Selway - drums ("Rest on the Rock", "Out of Light")
- Ian Carr - dobro (5, 10), electric guitar (2, 9) tenor ukulele (10)
- Andy Cutting - diatonic accordion ("Hope to See", "The Poorest Company")
- Phil Cunningham - accordion ("Hope to See", "The Poorest Company")
- Keith Angel - percussion (1, 2, 4, 6 & 7)
- Raymond McGinley - additional engineering
- Iain Hutchison - additional engineering
- Calum Malcolm - mastering
- Charles Shearer - artwork
- David Gillanders - photographs
