= Aidan O'Rourke (musician) =

Scottish contemporary folk music fiddle player and composer

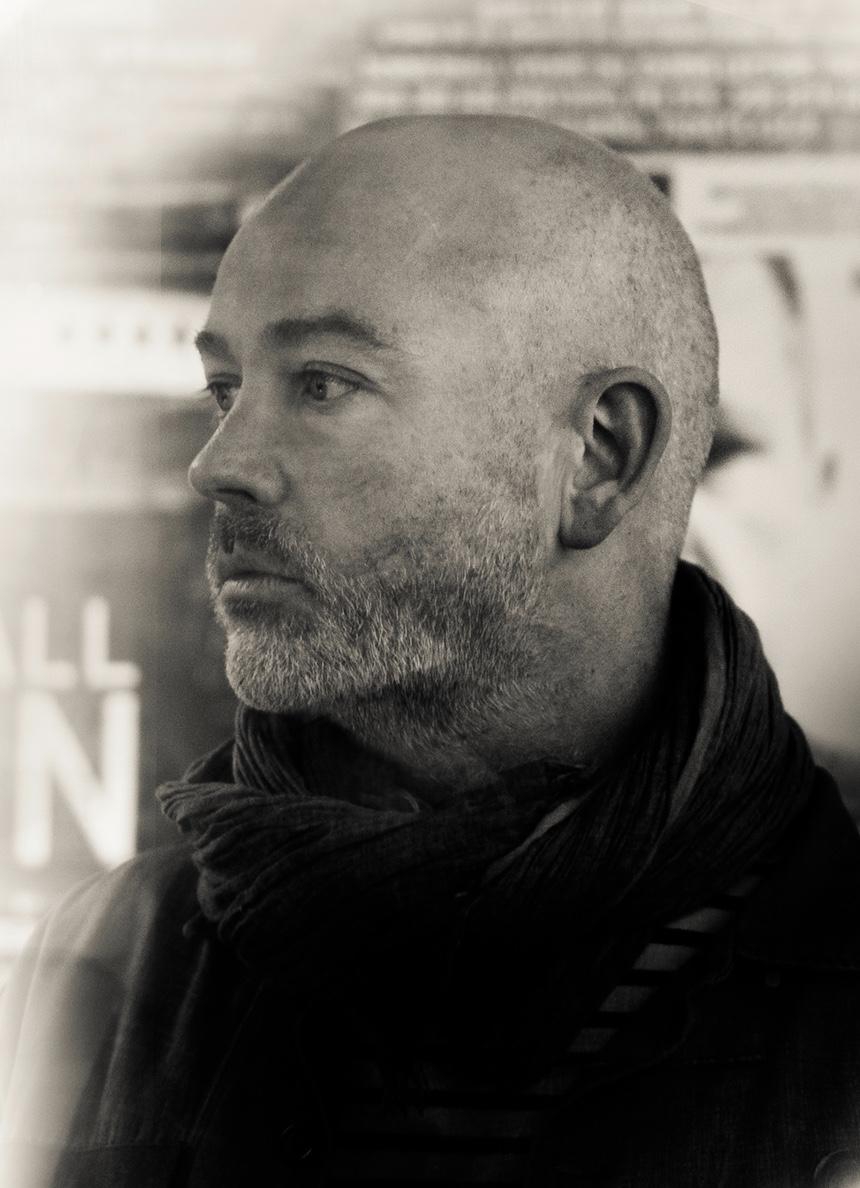
- O'Rourke in 2019

Background information
- Born: 1975 (age 50–51)
- Origin: Seil, Argyll and Bute, Scotland
- Genres: Contemporary folk, Scottish folk
- Occupations: Musician, composer
- Instrument: Fiddle
- Years active: 1998-present
- Member of: Lau
- Formerly of: Blazin' Fiddles; Sunhoney; Tabache; The Unusual Suspects

Aidan O'Rourke (born 1975) is a Scottish contemporary folk music fiddle player and composer. He was named the 2014 BBC Radio 2 Folk Awards Musician of the Year and the Scots Trad Music Awards 2011 Composer of the Year. In addition to his solo career, O'Rourke also plays in the award-winning folk trio Lau alongside Kris Drever and Martin Green. He was one of 20 musicians commissioned for New Music 20x12 by PRS for Music Foundation to celebrate the 2012 Summer Olympics. O'Rourke has worked with Eddi Reader, Andy Sheppard, Alyth, Roddy Woomble and appears on more than eighty recordings. Previously, he was a member of Blazin' Fiddles, The Unusual Suspects and Tabache.

== Early life and career ==
O'Rourke grew up in a musical family in Oban and later on the nearby island of Seil. He is of Scottish/Irish parentage and grew up listening to traditional songs from both countries. He studied civil engineering at Strathclyde University. After university he moved to Edinburgh in 1998 and joined Blazin' Fiddles in the same year. O'Rourke has also been a member of such groups as Tabache, Sunhoney, and Lau, and has guested on dozens of albums by other artists.

Sirius, O'Rourke's debut solo album, was released in 2006. It contains a fusion of folk, jazz, and drum and bass sounds inspired by traditional Scottish, Danish, and Irish music. He released An Tobar in 2008. The album, dedicated to an arts center of the same name on the Isle of Mull, consists of five songs rooted in Celtic music but often displaying a "progressive twist". The song "Tobar Nan Ealain", which Allmusic writer Chris Nickson calls the album's "centerpiece", begins with a poem from Aonghas MacNeacail and features guest vocals by Kirsty MacKinnon.

O'Rourke was commissioned to write a piece for the 2012 Summer Olympics. He told PRS for Music that the composition "draws inspiration from the fact that TAT-1 (Transatlantic No. 1) the first transatlantic telephone cable system was laid between Gallanach Bay, near Oban and Clarenville, Newfoundland between 1955 and 1956." O'Rourke released his third solo album, Hotline, in 2013, and he was named Musician of the Year at the 2014 BBC Radio 2 Folk Awards.

== Discography ==
=== Solo ===
- Sirius (2006)
- An Tobar (2008)
- Hotline (2013)

=== With Lau ===
- Lightweights and Gentlemen (2007)
- Live (2008)
- Arc Light (2009)
- Race the Loser (2012)
- The Bell That Never Rang (2015)

=== With Kan ===
- Sleeper (2015)

=== The Unusual Suspects ===
- Live in Scotland (2005)
- Big Like This (2011)

=== Tabache ===
- Are You Willing? (1996)
- Waves of Rush (1999)

=== With Big Big Train ===
- Common Ground (2021)
- Welcome to the Planet (2022)
