= Hasan Al-Habib =

British comedian

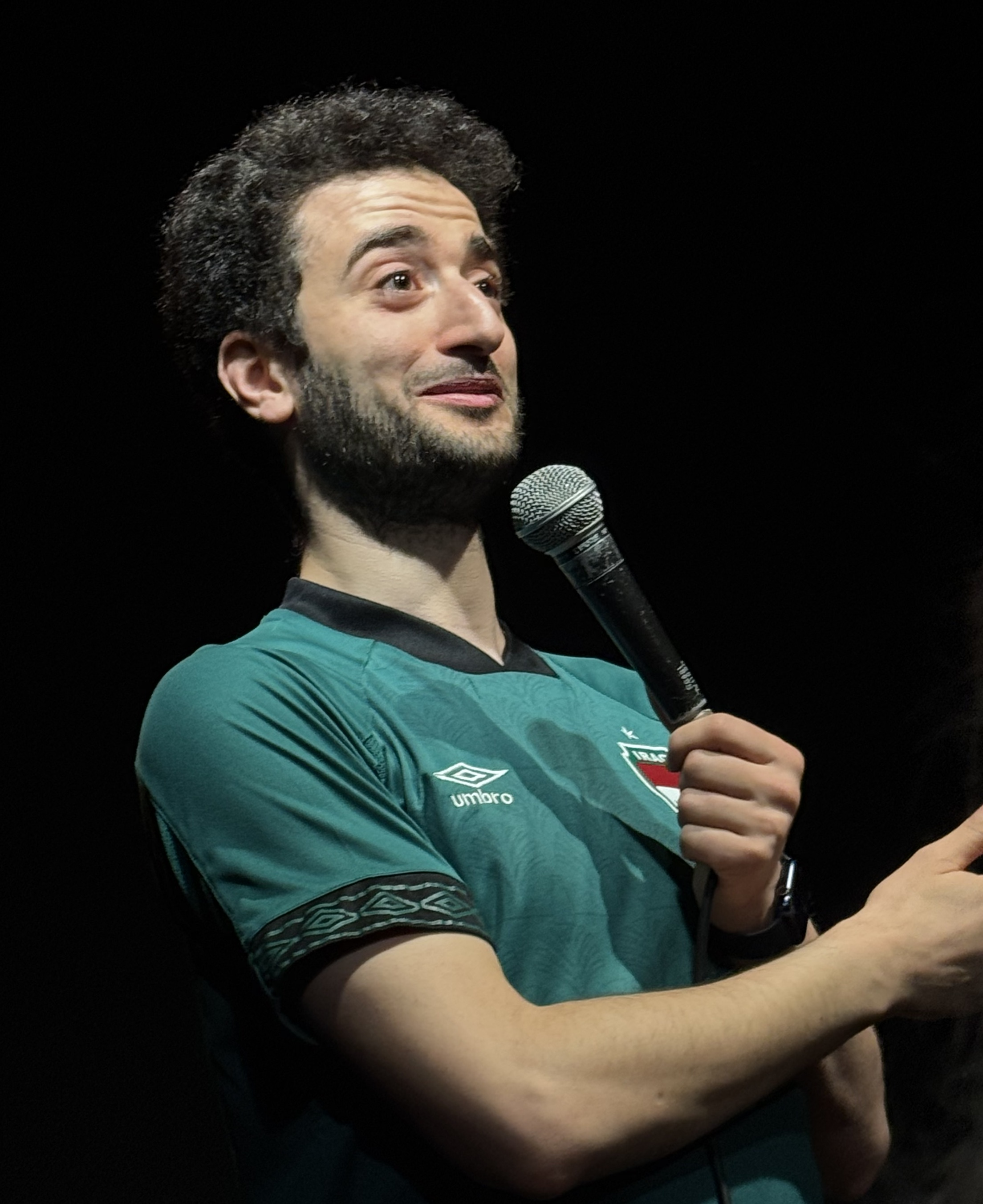
Al-Habib in 2025

Hasan Al-Habib (born 1993 or 1994) is an Iraqi-British comedian. He was a member of Footlights while earning his doctorate at the University of Cambridge. He participated on the BBC's Pilgrimage series in 2026.

== Biography ==
Born in London to Iraqi parents, Habib moved to Lickey Hills near Birmingham at age two, where he grew up. He began in comedy as a way to defend himself from bullies after the September 11 attacks. In 2019, he named his favourite comedians as Frankie Boyle, Sacha Baron Cohen and Jon Stewart.

In 2011, Habib watched an episode of Celebrity Mastermind in which Robert Webb said that the key to a comedy career was joining Footlights at the University of Cambridge. He was unsuccessful in applying to study chemical engineering at Cambridge, instead studying biochemistry at Imperial College London. After a master's degree in radiation biology at the University of Oxford, he was accepted for a doctorate in oncology at Cambridge.

Habib was unsuccessful in his first audition for Footlights in 2016, in which he joked about Isis, the dog on Downton Abbey; he was accepted with the same routine the following year. A critic of what he saw as a lack of diversity in Footlights, he formed the "Footdarks", the organisation's first troupe composed entirely of minority comedians.

In October 2023, while working as a civil servant after returning to London, Habib won the Birmingham Comedy Festival Breaking Talent Award.

Habib's 2025 show Death to the West (Midlands) received a three-star review from Brian Logan in The Guardian who praised the consideration of Iraqi and Brummie identity. Mark Muldoon of Chortle gave a four-star review.

Habib, a Muslim, participated in the 2026 series of Pilgrimage, in which celebrities with differing beliefs made a pilgrimage in northeastern England. Among his fellow participants was another stand-up comedian, Ashley Blaker, a former Orthodox Jew.
