= Live (Lau album) =

Live album by Lau
- Released: April 28, 2008
- Genre: Folk
- Label: Navigator Records

Lau chronology
Lightweights and Gentlemen (2007)	Live (2008)	Arc Light (2009)

Live is a live album by contemporary folk three-piece Lau, released on 28 April 2008 by Navigator Records.

== Track listing ==
All tracks arranged by Kris Drever, Martin Green and Aidan O'Rourke

1. "Stewarts"
2. "Banks of Marble"
3. "Frank and Flo's"
4. "Butcher Boy"
5. "Sea"
6. "The Lang Set"
7. "Unquiet Grave"
8. "Hinba"
9. "Gallowhill"

== Personnel ==
- Kris Drever - guitar, vocals, mixing
- Martin Green - accordion, mixing
- Aidan O'Rourke - fiddle, mixing
- Stuart Hamilton - engineering
- Calum Malcolm - mixing
- Hugo Morris - cover artwork photography
