= The Classic (Joan as Police Woman album) =

Studio album by Joan As Police Woman
- Released: March 10, 2014
- Recorded: Ground Control Studios, Maid's Room Studios, Vibromonk
- Genre: Rock, jazz
- Label: PIAS
- Producer: Joan Wasser and Tyler Wood

Joan As Police Woman chronology
The Deep Field (2011)	The Classic (2014)	Let It Be You (2016)

Professional ratings
Aggregate scores
Source	Rating
Metacritic	70/100
Review scores
Source	Rating
AllMusic	4/5 stars
Consequence of Sound	C
MusicOMH	4/5 stars
PopMatters	6/10
NME	6/10

The Classic is the fourth studio album by the American artist Joan As Police Woman (aka Joan Wasser), released on March 10, 2014, through PIAS. It included the single "Holy City" that was inspired by a visit to Jerusalem.The song was described as "Motown-influenced pop fusion" and the release was supported by an Alex de Campi directed video.

The comedian Reggie Watts contributed beatboxing to the title track and rapping to the single "Holy City."

In 2016 it was awarded a silver certification from the Independent Music Companies Association which indicated sales of at least 20,000 copies throughout Europe.

== Track listing ==
All tracks are written by Joan Wasser.

No.	Title	Length
1.	"Witness"	4:44
2.	"Holy City"	4:45
3.	"The Classic"	3:27
4.	"Good Together"	7:03
5.	"Get Direct"	6:44
6.	"What Would You Do"	5:43
7.	"New Years Day"	6:34
8.	"Shame"	4:38
9.	"Stay"	4:41
10.	"Ask Me"	3:58

== Personnel ==
- Joan Wasser – vocals, guitar, strings, clavinet, electric piano
- Tyler Wood – bass guitar, electronic organ, trumpet, piano, synthesizer, percussion, backing vocals
- Parker Kindred – drums, percussion, backing vocals
- Doug Wieselman – baritone saxophone and tenor saxophone
- Oren Bloedow – guitar
- Briggan Krauss – baritone saxophone, alto saxophone
- Steven Bernstein – trumpet and French horn
- Joseph Arthur, Nathan Larson, Michelle Zayla, Stephanie McKay, Toshi Reagon – backing vocals
- Reggie Watts – outro on "Holy City"', human beatbox on "The Classic"

Technical personnel

- Tyler Wood – engineering, mixing and production
- Murray Trider – engineering (Ground Control)
- Jack McKeever & TJ Doherty – engineering (Maid's Room)
- Adam Sachs – engineering and mixing on "The Classic"
- Dan Shatzky – engineering (Vibromonk)

Design

- Lance Scott Walker – graphic design
- Stephanie Sidjakov – photography/graphic design
- Dan Monick – cover photograph
