= Joan As Police Woman =

American musician (born 1970)

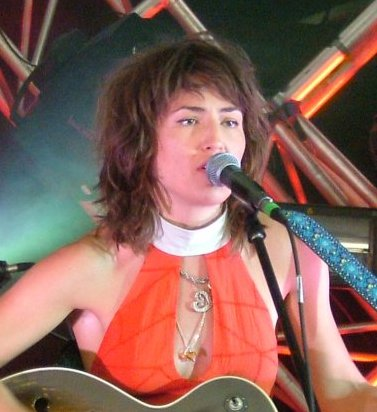
- Joan Wasser performing at the Summer Sundae festival, 2006

Background information
- Born: Joan Wasser; July 26, 1970 (age 56); Biddeford, Maine, U.S.
- Origin: Norwalk, Connecticut, U.S.
- Genres: Rock; pop; jazz
- Occupations: Musician; songwriter
- Instruments: Vocals; violin; guitar; piano
- Years active: 1991–present
- Labels: PIAS; Reveal; Sweet Police
- Formerly of: The Dambuilders; Anohni and the Johnsons; Those Bastard Souls; Black Beetle
- Website: joanaspolicewoman.com

Joan Wasser (born July 26, 1970) is an American musician, singer-songwriter and producer who releases music as Joan As Police Woman. She began her career playing violin with the Dambuilders and played with Black Beetle, Antony and the Johnsons, and Those Bastard Souls. Since 2004 she has released her solo material as Joan As Police Woman. She has released five regular studio albums, one extended play (EP), a number of singles and two albums of cover songs. Throughout her career, she has regularly collaborated with other artists as a writer, performer and arranger.

== Early life ==
Born at the Saint Andre Home in Biddeford, Maine, to an unmarried teenage mother, Wasser was placed for adoption at infancy. She was raised in Norwalk, Connecticut. She credits her background as an adopted child with her "very extroverted" personality and dressing up a lot. She says that "when you are in a situation where you're not blood-related to your family, it does become extremely obvious that you're born with your personality".

Wasser began piano lessons at age six and violin lessons at age eight. She played violin in school and community orchestras before leaving Norwalk for her college studies. At the age of 18, Wasser began her music career during her studies at the College of Fine Arts, Boston University. She studied music under, among others, Yuri Mazurkevich, and played with the Boston University Symphony Orchestra. Wasser soon grew disillusioned and found that she "didn't want to make classical music my life, the Beethoven symphonies have already been played a million times and I am not going to do it any better". Instead, she joined a number of local punk bands trying "to bridge the gap between the guitar and the bass and play the violin really loud".

== Career ==
=== The Dambuilders ===
In 1991, Wasser joined the Dambuilders who were signed to Elektra Records in 1994. Wasser featured on three albums as a violinist. The band played a number of shows on the East Coast, and found an admirer in Colin Greenwood of Radiohead. On stage, Wasser managed to stand out with "bright costumes and dyed, often dreadlocked hair". In 1995, the band appeared at Lollapalooza followed by the release of the album Ruby Red. Wasser augmented her role within the band, adding guitar and keyboard parts, singing vocals, as well as co-writing several songs as found on the album Against the Stars.

Wasser began to make a name for herself in the indie rock world during her time in The Dambuilders as she developed her aggressive style of playing, which led to work outside the group. Wasser moved to Brooklyn, New York in 1996, while The Dambuilders disbanded in October 1997.

=== Black Beetle ===
In May 1997, her fiance of three years, musician Jeff Buckley, drowned accidentally in Memphis. She found it "such a traumatic experience of loss. I needed to grieve but I didn't know how". She continued to play with Those Bastard Souls, a band started in 1995 by a close friend of the couple, Dave Shouse of Grifters. They made a record entitled Debt & Departure attempting to respond to Buckley's death. In late 1997, she created a band with the remaining members of Buckley's band called Black Beetle and finished an eponymous album that was never released. This was the first project where she was writing as well as fronting a band. She commented, "I found singing terrifying at first, I didn't know about the boundaries of my voice and I had no idea what words I wanted to say. The violin had been my voice for so long."

=== Antony and the Johnsons ===
In 1999, Wasser joined Antony and the Johnsons, first as a violinist, then as a full-time member. She contributed to their Mercury Prize-winning album, I Am a Bird Now. She explained that she "was called up to stand in for another violinist but by the end of the rehearsal (she) was in the band". The experience was "like a renaissance", and she "was surrounded by gentle people and quiet music [...] I had a space to let go".

=== Joan As Police Woman ===
While working with others, Wasser began to develop her own material, which she described as sounding "like old Al Green records". She focused on guitar and singing as "for a long time, I was really content with playing violin [...] and then all of a sudden it wasn't enough". The end of Black Beetle in June 2002 brought the beginning of Wasser's work as a solo artist and the creation of a new band, Joan as Police Woman. The name was a reference to the TV series Police Woman featuring Angie Dickinson. Wasser found the actress inspirational as "she was really powerful but sexy at the same time" in the role. She also preferred "the name to be funny because, although my music is serious, I like to laugh at tragedy". She formed a new trio in New York City together with Ben Perowsky on drums and Rainy Orteca on bass. Perowsky also co-produced the EP that also featured contributions by Oren Bloedow, Dave Derby and Erik Sanko. She co-wrote the song "My Gurl" with Michael Tighe. The group self-released a five-track eponymous EP in 2004, as Wasser had "decided to do it without a record deal because I wanted to make music on my own terms". In February 2004, Rufus Wainwright asked her to join his band on tour providing backing vocals and strings. In the second half of the year, she joined Joseph Arthur on tour as a violinist.

==== Real Life ====
In December 2005, Wasser signed a distribution deal with Reveal Records, a British indie label, which subsequently re-released the self-titled debut EP, while adding one track. Joan as Police Woman's full-length debut, Real Life, appeared in the UK on June 12, 2006, and through PIAS in Europe and elsewhere. She embarked on a tour around Europe where she played a mixture of headlining shows and support slots, including the Guillemots.

The album was released in the USA on June 12, 2007, on Cheap Lullaby Records based in Los Angeles. In early 2008, Real Life won in The 7th Annual Independent Music Awards for Best Pop/Rock Album. The album included three singles, "Christobel", "The Ride", and "Eternal Flame", which was supported by a video directed by Leah Meyerhoff.

==== To Survive ====
Her second album, To Survive, was released in June 2008 and featured Rufus Wainwright on the song "To America". The title referred to the loss of her mother to cancer, where she felt encouraged "to talk about it, [to] put it into words and get it out there". It was recorded with Rainy Orteca and Parker Kindred, an old friend and drummer of her previous band Black Beetle. The album reached No. 43 in Uncut's review of the year 2008, as well as in Q Magazine's top 50. Musically it was described as having "dance-floor soul and indie-rock influences".

With Rainy Orteca departing to pursue her own projects, Wasser and Kindred were joined by Timo Ellis on bass guitar for touring in 2008.

At the end of her 2009 European tour, Wasser returned to New York to play a show and release a new album of cover songs, entitled Cover.

==== The Deep Field ====
In 2011, she released her third album, The Deep Field. It contained the singles "The Magic", "Nervous" and "Chemmie".

==== The Classic ====
On March 10, 2014, Wasser released her fourth album, The Classic, featuring the single "Holy City", featuring a video filmed by Alex de Campi.

==== Let It Be You ====
In 2016, Wasser collaborated with Benjamin Lazar Davis and released the album Let It Be You in October. It was preceded by the single "Broke Me in Two". The album received mixed reviews, with DIY noting it as a "curiously unbalanced album", while AllMusic described it as "a collection of appealingly loose, lush songs full of creativity". The duo followed the release by a UK tour.

==== Damned Devotion ====
The album Damned Devotion was released on February 9, 2018. Emily Mackay, writing for The Guardian, describes Wasser's return to her "characteristically languorous, smoky zone". Before the album release Wasser released the single Tell Me.

==== Joanthology ====
The album Joanthology was released on May 24, 2019.

==== The Solution Is Restless ====
In 2019 Wasser participated in an Africa Express concert of March 29 organized by Damon Albarn, where she met fellow performer Tony Allen. Later that year the pair collaborated, with Dave Okumu of The Invisible, on her ninth solo album, The Solution Is Restless. It was released in 2021.

== Collaborations ==
Wasser has done session work providing strings and vocals for a number of artists throughout her career. Her resume includes live performances and studio work with Elton John, Lou Reed, Rufus Wainwright, John Cale, Sheryl Crow, Scissor Sisters, Sparklehorse, Dave Gahan, Tanya Donelly, Joseph Arthur, and Fan Modine.

She has worked with Nathan Larson on his side-project, Mind Science of the Mind and ex-Fishbone member Chris Dowd's Seedy Arkhestra album. In the liner notes to an album by the latter, Dowd praised her as a "soulful mothafucka".

In 2006, Wasser contributed backing vocals and violin to the track "Redwings" on Guillemots' debut album Through the Windowpane. She provided vocals and plays the violin on the song "Ballad of a Deadman" alongside David Sylvian on Steve Jansen's album Slope which was released in 2007. Wasser was credited for playing piano, violin, and guitar as well as contributing vocals on Lloyd Cole's 2010 release, Broken Record.

In 2013, she started the band 2001 with Benjamin Lazar Davis, which released its first single "Broke Me in Two" in September 2015.

Also in 2014, she began to work and perform with Scottish folk outfit Lau, producing their album The Bell That Never Rang, released in May 2015.

In 2020, Wasser appeared on the Gorillaz song "Simplicity" from their seventh album Song Machine, Season One: Strange Timez.

== Discography ==
=== Studio albums ===
Album details	Peak chart positions									
Album details	AUT	BEL	DEN	FRA	GER	IRL	ITA	NED	SWI	UK
Real Life: Released: June 12, 2006; Label: Reveal	—	40	—	—	—	—	—	63	—	169
To Survive: Released: June 9, 2008; Label: Reveal, Cheap Lullaby, PIAS	—	10	17	180	—	42	44	27	93	56
Cover: Released: 2009; Label: Reveal; Notes: Limited release	—	—	—	—	—	—	—	—	—	—
The Deep Field: Released: January 25, 2011; Label: Reveal	60	14	9	119	54	42	72	23	66	40
The Classic: Released: March 10, 2014; Label: PIAS	70	32	—	—	82	78	79	32	—	44
Let It Be You: Released: October 21, 2016; Label: Reveal; Notes: with Benjamin Lazar Davis	—	119	—	—	—	—	—	—	—	—
Damned Devotion: Released: February 9, 2018; Label: PIAS	72	36	—	—	78	—	—	84	47	57
Cover Two: Released: May 1, 2020; Label: Sweet Police	—	—	—	—	—	—	—	—	—	—
The Solution Is Restless (with Tony Allen and Dave Okumu): Released: November 5, 2021; Label: Sweet Police	—	—	—	—	—	—	—	—	—	—
Lemons, Limes and Orchids: Released: September 20, 2024; Label: PIAS	—	168	—	—	—	—	—	—	—	—
"—" denotes a title that did not chart, or was not released in that territory.

=== Compilation albums ===
Details
Joanthology
- Label: PIAS
- Released: May 24, 2019

=== Live albums ===
Details
Live
- Label: Sweet Police
- Released: 2020

=== EPs ===
- Joan as Police Woman (self-released 2004 – CD; re-released February 27, 2006)

=== Singles ===
Year	Title	Peak chart positions			Album
Year	Title	BEL	SCO	UK	Album
2006	"My Gurl"	—	—	—	Joan as Police Woman
2006	"The Ride"	—	71	144	Real Life
2006	"Eternal Flame"	—	63	132	Real Life
2006	"Christobel"	—	84	200	Real Life
2007	"Flushed Chest"	—	—	—	Real Life
2007	"Real Life"	—	—	—	Real Life
2008	"To Be Loved"	—	—	—	To Survive
2008	"Holiday"	—	—	—	To Survive
2008	"To America"	—	—	—	To Survive
2009	"Start of My Heart"	—	—	—	To Survive
2011	"The Magic"	59	—	—	The Deep Field
2011	"Nervous"	—	—	—	The Deep Field
2011	"Chemmie"	—	—	—	The Deep Field
2013	"The Classic"	104	—	—	The Classic
2014	"Holy City"	104	—	—	The Classic
2014	"Witness"	—	—	—	The Classic
2014	"Shame"	—	—	—	The Classic
2016	"Broke Me in Two"	—	—	—	Let It Be You
2016	"Let It Be You"	—	—	—	Let It Be You
2017	"Warning Bell"	—	—	—	Damned Devotion
2017	"Wonderful"	—	—	—	Damned Devotion
2018	"Tell Me"	84	—	—	Damned Devotion
2019	"Kiss"	—	—	—	Cover Two
2020	"Spread"	—	—	—	Cover Two
2020	"Out of Time"	—	—	—	Cover Two
2020	"There Are Worse Things I Could Do"	—	—	—	Cover Two
2020	"Not the Way"	—	—	—	Cover Two
2020	"Under Control"	—	—	—	Cover Two
"—" denotes a title that did not chart, or was not released in that territory.

=== Compilation appearances ===
- 2003: Jane Magazine compilation ("Prime Mover")
- 2007: Back to Mine: Guillemots ("The Ride")
- 2008: Mojo Presents The White Album Recovered Vol. 1 ("I Will")
- 2012: Spirit of Talk Talk (Myrrhman)
- 2012: The Separate – Orchestral Variations V.01 (This Night Has Opened My Eyes)
- 2020: Songs for Australia, performing a cover of Gotye's "Hearts a Mess"
