= Kris Drever =

Scottish musician

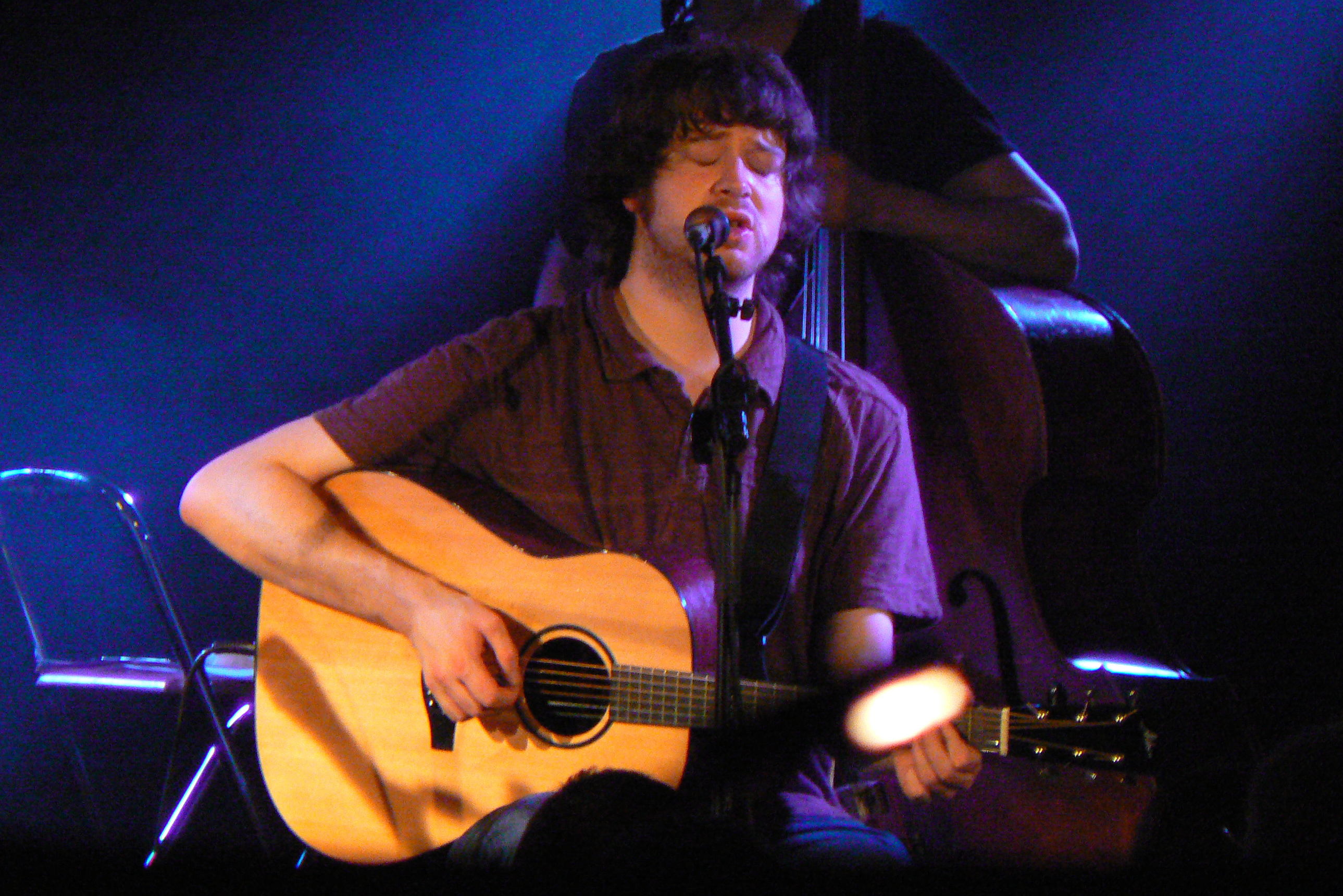
- Drever performing live

Background information
- Born: 31 October 1978 (age 47); Kirkwall, Orkney, Scotland
- Genres: Folk
- Occupation: Musician
- Instruments: Vocals, guitar
- Years active: 1995–present
- Label: Reveal
- Website: krisdrever.com

Kris Drever (born 31 October 1978) is a Scottish contemporary folk musician and songwriter who came to prominence in 2006 with the release of his debut solo album, Black Water. Drever is the vocalist and guitarist of the folk trio Lau with Martin Green and Aidan O'Rourke. He has worked with other British folk contemporaries, including Kate Rusby, John McCusker, Ian Carr, Eddi Reader and Julie Fowlis.

== Career ==
Drever was born in Kirkwall, Orkney, where he learned to play guitar and participated in the island's folk festival. In 1995 at age 17 he moved to Edinburgh, where he played at the Tron Ceilidh House several nights a week. He played the double bass for a time but returned to the guitar where his style – "a highly individual blend of rhythm and harmony, folk, jazz, rock and country inflections" – made him a sought after session musician.

In late 2000 he began playing alongside Nuala Kennedy and Anna-Wendy Stevenson in a weekly session at Sandy Bell's pub in Edinburgh. The trio became known as Fine Friday and toured in the UK, Europe and Australia, releasing two albums before disbanding. Drever went on to collaborate with a number of prominent folk musicians including Cathy Ryan of Irish-American supergroup Cherish the Ladies; Scottish fiddlers John McCusker and Bruce MacGregor; Irish accordionist Leo McCann; Gaelic band Tannas; and the Irish dance show Celtic Fusion. Drever is also a founding member of the folk collective Session A9, has been a member of Kate Rusby's band and has worked with contemporary folk artists Eddi Reader and Julie Fowlis.

In 2005 Drever formed the trio Lau with Scottish fiddler Aidan O'Rourke and English accordionist Martin Green. The band has released five studio albums to date and conducted numerous tours throughout the UK and worldwide. He also collaborated with Roddy Woomble, lead singer of Scottish indie band Idlewild, and John McCusker. The trio worked, along with other notable folk musicians, on an album entitled Before the Ruin, which was released in September 2008.

Before the release of Black Water, Drever had not considered a solo career. In an interview with Mojo, Drever stated:

[I had] been working as a guitarist for eight years or so and just did the odd solo spot. Various people said I should do solo work but I wasn't sure. John McCusker, who produced the album, harangued me about it. Then I was playing with Kate Rusby, filling in for Ian Carr, and she got me to do a song in the set. Tom Rose at Reveal Records saw me and asked if I wanted to do a record. It all went from there.

A live DVD was released 28 July 2008, featuring Drever's "Classic Album" set at 2008's Celtic Connections.

In January 2010, Drever released his second solo album, Mark the Hard Earth, during Celtic Connections. Drever launched the album with a concert at the Old Fruitmarket on 29 January, alongside his former band, Session A9.

Drever's third solo album, If Wishes Were Horses, was released in March 2016.

== Personal life ==
Kris is the son of Ivan Drever, a former member of Wolfstone. and Carolyn Allan:Vocalist [The Knowe o Deil band]Originally from Orkney, Drever lived in Shetland for a few years before moving to the mainland in 2019; he now lives in Glasgow with his wife Louise and their children.

== Discography ==
=== Solo ===
- Black Water (2006)
- Mark the Hard Earth (2010)
- If Wishes Were Horses (2016)
- Hill and Shore (2019)
- Where the World Is Thin (2020)
- Doing This for Love (2026)

=== With Lau ===
- Lightweights and Gentlemen (2007)
- Live (2008)
- Arc Light (2009)
- Race the Loser (2012)
- The Bell That Never Rang (2015)
- Decade – The Best of 2007–2017 (2017)
- Midnight and Closedown (2019)
- Unplugged (2020)

=== With Roddy Woomble and John McCusker ===
- Before the Ruin (2008) No. 156 UK

=== With Fine Friday ===
- Mowing The Machair
- Gone Dancing

=== With Éamonn Coyne ===
- Honk Toot Suite (2007)
- Storymap (2013)
- Mareel EP (2014)

=== With Boo Hewerdine ===
- Last Man Standing EP (2015), Reveal

=== Other appearances ===
- The Girl Who Couldn't Fly – Kate Rusby (2005)
- Ballads of the Book – Idlewild's "The Weight of Years" (2007)
- Awkward Annie – Kate Rusby (2007)
- In Love and Light – Heidi Talbot (2008)
- Farrar – Duncan Chisholm (2008)

== Awards ==
=== BBC Radio 2 Folk Awards ===
- 2007: Horizon Award for Best Newcomer – winner
- 2008, 2009, 2010, 2013: Best Group – winner (with Lau)
- 2017: Folk Singer of the Year – winner; Best Original Song – winner for "If Wishes Were Horses"

=== Garden Sessions ===
- 2008: Song of the Year – winner for 'Poorest Company' with Roddy Woomble & John McCusker
