= Benjamin Lazar Davis =

American multi-instrumentalist

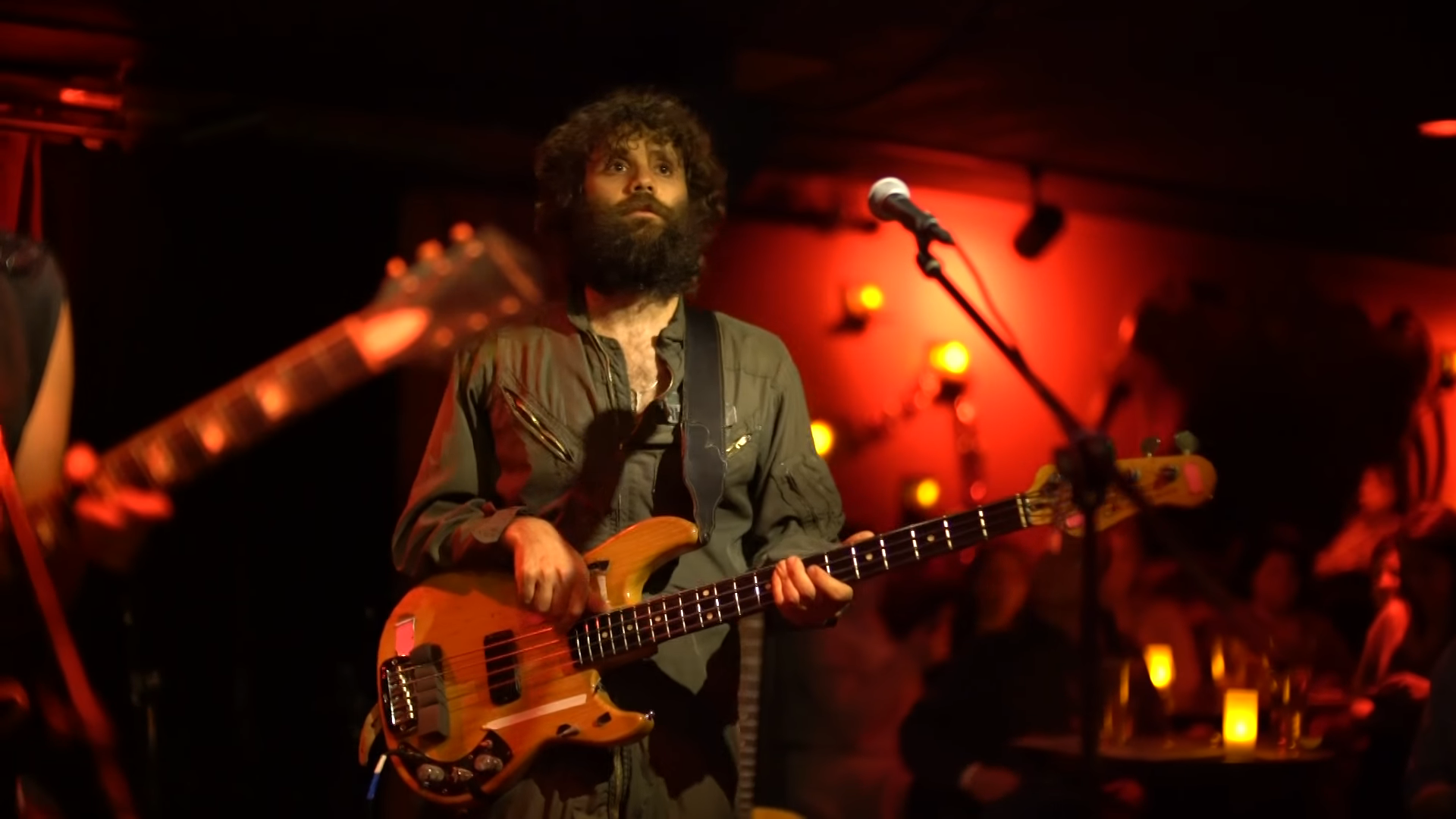
- Davis performing with Bridget Kearney in 2017

Background information
- Born: 1986 (age 38–39) (abt); New York
- Genres: Pop music; indie music; bluegrass
- Occupations: Musician; songwriter; vocal music; producer
- Instruments: Vocals; guitar; piano; percussion
- Years active: 2005–present
- Labels: Signature Sounds Recordings; ATO Records; Northern Spy Records; Reveal Records
- Member of: Cuddle Magic; Okkervil River
- Website: benjaminlazardavis.com

Benjamin Lazar Davis is an American multi-instrumentalist, singer-songwriter, arranger, composer, and record producer. He is a member of several bands, including Okkervil River and Cuddle Magic. Davis attended New England Conservatory of Music.

== Early life ==
Davis was raised in Saratoga Springs, New York. His father, Peter, started being a musician at the age of five.

Davis has a brother and two sisters. He collaborates with his brother Tim on songs.

== Bands and collaborations ==
In 2006 while students at The New England Conservatory of Music Davis, Alec Spiegelman, Christopher McDonald, Kristin Slipp, Cole Kamen-Green, and David Flaherty founded Cuddle Magic in 2006. The band is known for collaborations with many artists including Fred Frith, Ran Blake, the David Wax Museum, Larkin Grimm, Mike & Ruthy (formerly of the Mammals), Phyllis Chen, Joy Kills Sorrow. Individuals from Cuddle Magic have also performed with Dirty Projectors, Bridget Kearney, Railbird, Sister Sparrow and the Dirty Birds, Baby States, Ronald Reagan, Bird Fly Yellow, Margaret Glaspy, The People's Champs, Girls Guns and Glory, Lake Street Dive, Petal Shield, Split Red, Yapp! and The Superpowers Horns.

Davis went to West Africa in 2009 and 2014 to study music. "The first time I went ...., I was studying awa drumming, which is like drum ensemble music for a bunch of different instruments." Davis is referring to a music tradition involving the djembe and dunun style of drums. In his first visit he heard of northern Ghanaian tradition of music called Bawa. In 2014 Davis traveled to Ghana with Bridget Kearney of Lake Street Dive and a former member of Cuddle Magic. They spent just over two weeks in the capital Accra, studying the traditional music of Northwest Ghana with master gyil player Aaron Bebe. They subsequently co-released an EP, BAWA, incorporating gyil music as source material. After leaving Ghana, Davis came down with typhoid and was very sick.

When Davis and Joan Wasser (Joan As Police Woman) met in 2013, they found they both had an interest in Central African Republic Pygmy music. Davis co-wrote, recorded, co-produced and toured for the album Let It Be You (Reveal Records 2016) with Wasser.

== Discography ==
=== With Cuddle Magic ===
- Cuddle Magic (2008)
- Picture (2010)
- Info Nympho (2012, FYO Records)
- Cuddle Magic & Phyllis Chen (2014), with Phyllis Chen
- Ashes/Axis (2017, Northern Spy Records)
- Bath (2020, Northern Spy Records)

=== With Bridget Kearney and Bbgun ===
- BAWA (2015, Signature Sounds)

=== With Joan As Police Woman ===
- Let It Be You (2016, Reveal Records)

=== With Okkervil River ===
- Away (2016, ATO Records)
- In the Rainbow Rain (2018, ATO Records)

=== Solo works ===
- Nothing Matters (2018, Independent)
