= Foka Wolf =

British satirical artist

- Known for: Street art
- Website: fokawolf.com

Foka Wolf is an anonymous British artist based in Birmingham, known for their (Note: Foka Wolf has been referred to in news reports as a man and woman; they stated in 2018 that they prefer they/them pronouns.) artworks involving political satire and subvertising. Their art often appears on billboards and tackles political subjects such as police brutality, climate change, corporate greed, workers' rights, gentrification and the housing crisis.

== Career and works ==
Foka Wolf went to art school, and followed this with jobs as a manual labourer and chalkboard writer. They additionally spent two weeks working as a graphic designer. Their main pseudonym is an apparent play on words involving the German manufacturer of second world war fighter planes Focke-Wulf. They have said they picked "just an offensive name" when working as an illustrator, which stuck.

Foka Wolf's work began with handwritten "jibberish" adverts that they wrote on a roll of stickers while "severely hungover". These first stickers included phrases such as "elephant tusks for sale", "I will pay for thumbs" and "brain surgery, over 20 years’ experience, cool prices, clean knives". They have said that they started making the art they are known for as "a bit of a wind-up" and enjoyed the danger. From this point, their work developed from multi-coloured pen drawings to large black-and-white posters designed digitally.

Their first work was a satirical advert which read, "Do you drive a 4x4, Jeep or Range Rover in the city? You could be entitled to free penis enlargement therapy on the NHS". They have stated that they received some serious enquiries about the advert. Their first works in 2018 involved a phone number, which by August 2018 had prompted around 500 calls according to Foka Wolf.

In response to the dismantling of a church in Park Central, Birmingham by Barratt Homes to make way for luxury flats, they created a satirical advert with the slogan "Erasing history to maximise profit". They also created an advert offering "voodoo classes for children", which featured the Birmingham City Council logo. They have said that they received death threats for this work due to people taking religious offence.

In August 2018, they placed a cardboard box outside Digbeth police station which read "Police robot unit. Low cost. No empathy. Conscience free. Totally safe." In November, they targeted a Primark store that was set to open in Birmingham, then billed to be the biggest in the world, with fake adverts for "Europe's biggest jumble sale" on boards around the site. Another of their works, a poster on an abandoned shop, read "Are you Brexit ready? Bunkers from £9,000. Flame-throwers. Child traps!" By this time they had gained over 10,000 Instagram followers.

In 2019, a series of unnamed posters by Foka Wolf were put up on London Underground trains which satirised Conservative Party pledges by creating their own, including promises to "erase all disabled people by December 2020", and "cut all homeless people in half by 2025", all of which featured the Conservative Party logo. These attracted attention on Twitter, with some commuters interpreting the adverts as genuine. Snopes later fact-checked the poster as "miscaptioned".

They have distributed free PDF files for download, some of which have been pasted onto Trump Tower in New York City. One of these was an "Over 75s No Rules Deathmatch" poster pasted onto its marble façade.

In 2020, to thank NHS workers during the COVID-19 pandemic, they painted a blue heart with the NHS logo onto the Custard Factory in Birmingham.

In January 2022, they opened a faux bargain store installation in Dudley, which included products such as "Lairy Little Prick", a parody of Fairy liquid. As of April 2022, they sold prints of their work on their website Megacorp and their newsletter had over 6,000 subscribers.

They placed a "for sale" sign outside City Hospital in Birmingham that read, "defund, make sure things don't work, people get angry, you hand it over to private capital", inspired by a quote from Noam Chomsky about the "standard technique of privatisation".

In January 2023 they involved themself in a parody campaign by the group Brandalism across Europe, focusing on the car industry for its lobbying tactics, coinciding with the European Motor Show's 100th anniversary. They took part in a gallery show for the first time that March with the show Why Are We Stuck In Hospital at the Ikon Gallery in Birmingham. In the show, they highlight the negative experiences of disabled and autistic people in the hospital system. It was advertised with a trail of billboards. By this time, they had amassed over 57,000 Instagram followers and 10,000 Twitter followers.

In March 2024 a poster by Foka Wolf, which featured UK government "Help for Households" branding and satirically advised people to "eat your children" to "save up to £30 per year on roast dinners", prompted a Reuters fact check to state it was made by the artist.

In February 2025, Foka Wolf placed stickers on a sign at a former Tesla showroom in Birmingham which has closed down the previous year, reading "Now Powered with 100% Small Dick Energy". In an interview, they called Elon Musk an "internet troll" with a "weird fascination" with the city.

== Artistic process ==
Describing their work as "misinformation" and "IRL trolling", they have listed influences including artist David Shrigley, Viz magazine, and satirical TV show Brass Eye, and compared their aesthetic to that of zines. Their work has been compared to that of Banksy, though is seen as more edgy and direct in his work, and has been referred to as "Brum Banksy" to this effect.

Humour is an important part of their work; they intend to "make them laugh and then make them think about their actions afterwards". In 2018, they said that they tried "not to have a political leaning... because we live in a time where it's a little bit clouded and no-one known what is really going on", though in 2022 said that their work had quickly become more political and more socially conscious. They are unconcerned that their works could be interpreted as genuine; they said in 2022 "We’re in a post-truth apocalypse," and that they were "only throwing a lighter into a house fire." They do not call themself a "proper activist", and in 2022 said they did not go to protests. A logo for the fictional company Megacorp and its motto "Profit before People" is a recurring motif in their work, with Foka Wolf's alternate pseudonym "Clive Babbington" as its fictional CEO.

Foka Wolf often takes little consideration when finding images online to work on, and then works on the images digitally. They then take significant consideration when choosing the placement of the works on specific billboards. They put them onto the billboards illegally, though usually in the daytime around 10:30 am, and have said they use a hi-vis jacket to blend in, usually taking around 30 seconds to paste the works. In 2018, the Foka Wolf they distributed the posters alongside five other anonymous people who were "mostly interns".
