= The Bell That Never Rang =

Studio album by Lau
- Released: 4 May 2015
- Recorded: Castlesound Studios, Scotland
- Genre: Folk
- Length: 43:53
- Label: Reveal Records
- Producer: Joan Wasser

Lau chronology
Race the Loser (2012)	The Bell That Never Rang (2015)

The Bell That Never Rang is the fourth studio album by British folk band Lau, released on 4 May 2015 on Reveal Records. Produced by Joan Wasser, the album's title is taken from the city of Glasgow's coat of arms, and features The Elysian Quartet on its title track.

The album is dedicated to the memory of The Elysian Quartet's Vince Sipprell, who died in January 2015.

== Background and recording ==
The Bell That Never Rang was produced by Joan Wasser, noted for her musical career under the name Joan As Police Woman. After visiting Wasser in New York City, the band collectively decided to work with her on their next studio album. Aidan O'Rourke noted, "It was when we got back and talked about the experiences and the excitement of the trip, we decided to invite Joan in to produce us".

== Writing and composition ==
The album's title track was initially commissioned by the Celtic Connections festival to celebrate the Commonwealth Games taking place in the city of Glasgow.

An early version of "Ghosts" appeared on the 2011 collaborative EP Lau vs Adem.

== Track listing ==
All tracks are written by Kris Drever, Martin Green and Aidan O'Rourke

No.	Title	Length
1.	"First Homecoming"	4:38
2.	"The Death of the Dining Car"	4:39
3.	"Back in Love Again"	6:45
4.	"Tiger Hill (Armoured Man)"	6:02
5.	"The Bell That Never Rang"	17:01
6.	"Ghosts"	4:48
