= Kai Samra =

Stand up Comedian

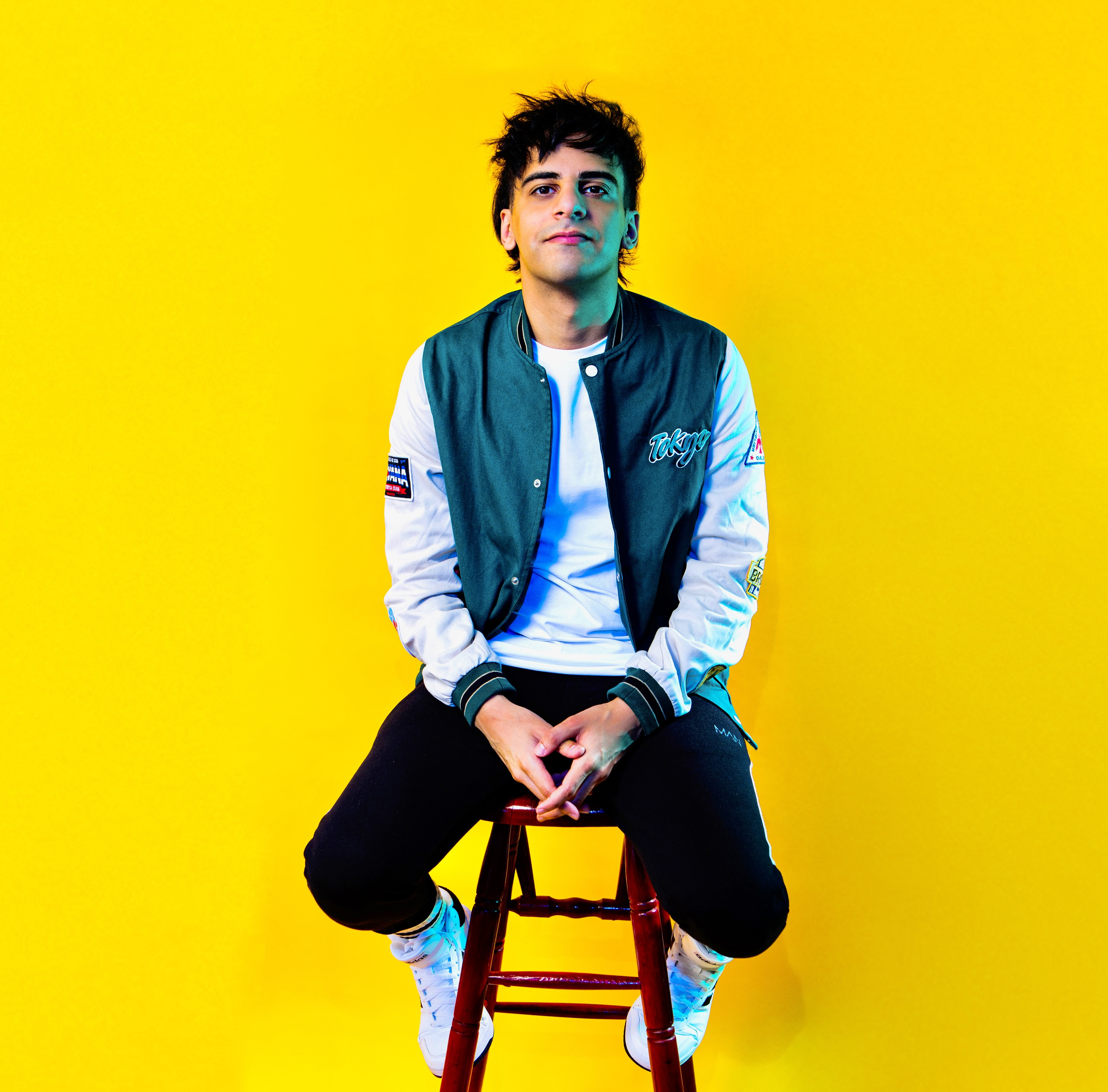
- Samra in 2023
- Born: Warwick, UK

Comedy career
- Years active: 2018–present
- Website: kaisamra.com

Kai Samra is a stand-up comedian, writer, musician from Handsworth, Birmingham based in London.

== Music ==
Kai was the lead singer/guitarist of Paris Pickpockets.An Indie/Dance band which formed in 2014 and were signed to the same management as Charli xcx and The 1975. They went on the support the Libertines, Bloc Party, Jungle and The View.

== Career ==
Samra took his critically acclaimed, debut stand-up comedy hour show, Underclass, to Edinburgh Fringe in 2019 produced by Soho Theatre. It was in The Guardian top recommended shows of the Edinburgh Festival Fringe. Underclass was filmed for an Amazon Prime Video Special in 2021. The show covers Samra's time at youth homeless shelter Centrepoint and a Vice show where Samra interviewed the former leader of the EDL Tommy Robinson.

Samra took his second show, Native, with Soho Theatre to the Edinburgh Fringe in 2022. He performed the show in Los Angeles at the Hayworth Theatre.

Samra has appeared on series 1 and 3 of ITV2's Stand-up sketch show. Samra wrote and performed his own episode on the BBC3 series Quickies. Samra has written and performed on Now Show on BBC Radio 4. In 2022, Samra was a writer for Romesh Ranganathan's The Ranganation. Samra was a judge for the BBC New Comedy Awards 2022. Samra was on Pointless Celebrities in 2024.
