= Martin Green (musician) =

English musician and composer

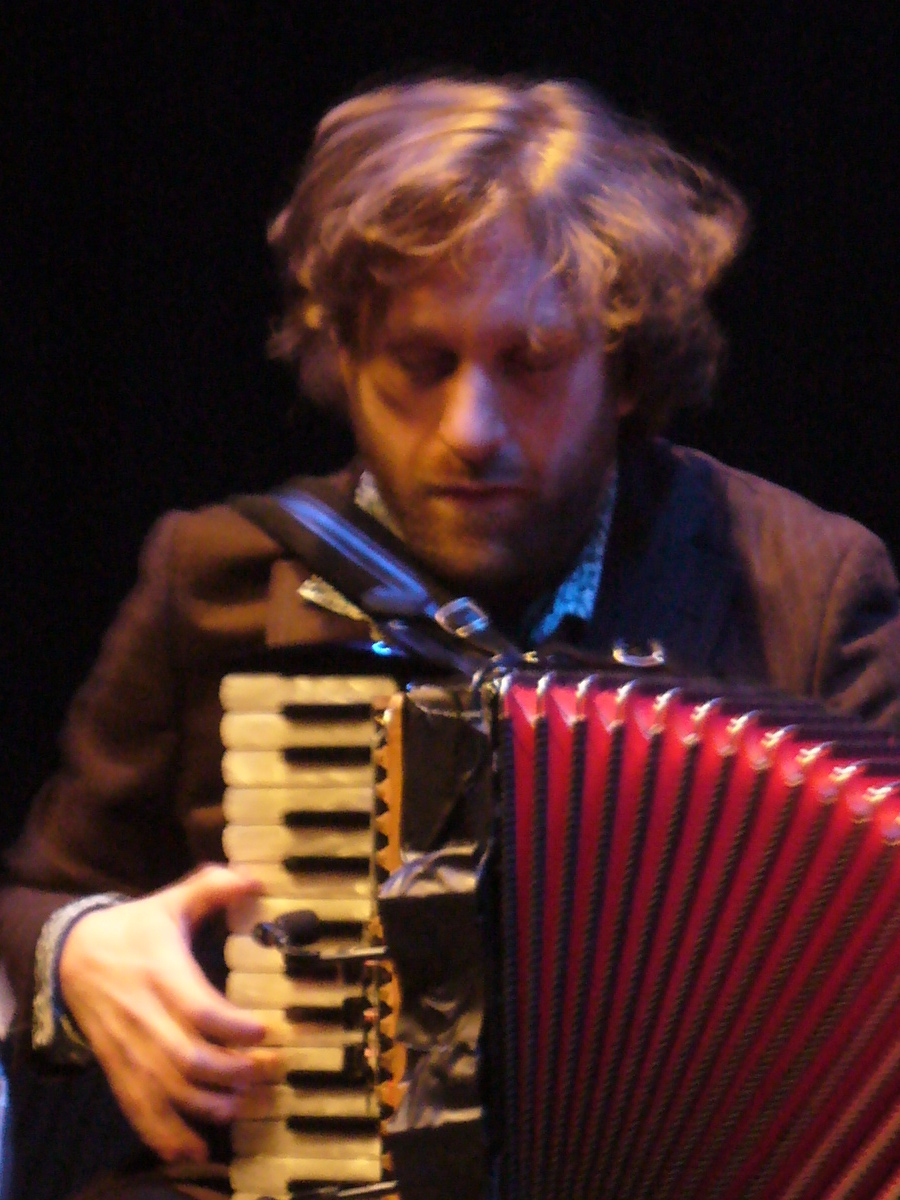
Green in 2010

Martin Green (born Sheffield, Yorkshire, England) is a British musician, composer and playwright, best known as the accordionist for the folk trio Lau. He has received four BBC Radio 2 Folk Awards as part of Lau and won an Ivor Novello Composer Award for his sound installation Aeons (2019).

== Career ==
His career as a composer began in 2003 with the goliath environmental theatre production of 'Albatross' based on Shackleton's journey, which was the centrepiece of the Glastonbury Festival's Theatre Field in 2004.

Alongside Aidan O'Rourke and Kris Drever, Green formed Lau in 2005. The folk trio have won awards including Best Group at the BBC Radio 2 Folk Awards on four occasions.

Green has been developing his solo career as a composer and has received a string of commissions, most significantly his theatrical song cycle Crows’ Bones for Opera North in 2012/13.

In 2014 he won a Paul Hamlyn Foundation Award for Artists in recognition of his work as a composer.

In 2015 Green was commissioned to write music and create a new noise device by the Kronos Quartet. The new piece of music, Seiche, was performed on the Kronos Quartet's UK tour in 2016.

Green began work on Flit in 2016, a new production created in collaboration with BAFTA-winning animators Will Anderson and Ainslie Henderson of whiterobot. Flit features musicians Adrian Utley, Dominic Aitchison, Becky Unthank (of The Unthanks) and Adam Holmes and premieres at the Edinburgh International Festival 2016.

Martin Green has also worked as a session musician for Linda Thompson and Eliza Carthy among others. As part of Lau he has performed with Jack Bruce of Cream.

== Personal life ==
Green's ancestors were Jewish refugees who fled Austria in the 1930s. His great-grandfather ended up in a Jewish ghetto in Shanghai, then a few years later his grandmother left for London with her mother. Green grew up in Leeds. His partner is musician Inge Thomson; the family lives in Shetland, Scotland.
