= Anja McCloskey =

American singer-songwriter

Anja McCloskey (born c. 1982) is a German-American singer-songwriter signed to British label Sotones Records. Her debut album An Estimation was released in September 2012 and received the Musicians Benevolent Fund "Emerging Excellence" award. It was received positively by the press, with the Daily Express calling it "simply magnificent" and Q Magazine making lead single A Kiss Track of the Day, referring to it as "sultry folk, like a Romany gypsy cabaret show" Her second album Quincy Who Waits followed in 2014, again to critical acclaim, with The Arts Desk calling it "one of the year’s prettiest albums" and Louder Than War describing it as a "beautiful album with some quite stunning vocals and musical arrangements."

Anja was born to a German mother and an American father in the American Mid-West, but spent most of her childhood and teenage years in Elmshorn, Northern Germany. Choosing accordion as her first instrument after watching her grandfather play the instrument at family parties, she performed with the accordion orchestra Musikschule Elmshorn and was taught by Susanne Drdack. She moved to the United Kingdom at the age of twenty to obtain a degree in print journalism and remained in England, both in London, Southampton and Brighton, until 2017. She currently resides in Hamburg, Germany.

Anja works/ has worked and performs/ has performed with The Irrepressibles, Haunted Stereo, Helen McCookerybook, Ana Silvera, Katy Carr, Moulettes, Pog, Etao Shin, Moneytree, and David Miatt of Thomas Tantrum and plays in the London Accordion Orchestra.

Her debut EP Turn, Turn, Turn was released on Sotones Records in September 2010, followed by a tour in the US. Anja's first full-length album An Estimation was released in September 2012. It spawned the singles And Her Head, A Kiss, Italian Song, and Instigate It. Her second album Quincy Who Waits was released in September 2014 with the singles Too Many Words and Henry Lives. Her most recent solo release was in 2017, where she contributed the track Spiralling to the Sotones Records 10-year Anniversary Release.

Since 2023, Anja has been a part of the Hamburg-based alternative folk band Songraes, together with Hannes Klock (Acadian Post) and Leo Bruges.

Anja also plays piano and clarinet and is a contributor to music magazine Wears The Trousers. She is a director of Sotones Records and Sotones Music Publishing and a committed vegan.
