= Ruby Red (Dambuilders album) =

Studio album by the Dambuilders
- Released: 1995
- Label: East West/Elektra
- Producer: Don Gehman

The Dambuilders chronology
Encendedor (1994)	Ruby Red (1995)	God Dambuilders Bless America (1996)

Ruby Red is an album by the American band the Dambuilders, released in 1995. It was the band's first major label album of completely new material.

The first single was "Teenage Loser Anthem". The band supported the album by touring with Better Than Ezra.

== Production ==
The album was produced by Don Gehman. Its lyrics were written by the singer and bass player Dave Derby; all four band members wrote the music. Gehman encouraged the band to think more about its vocal harmonies, and the intertwining of Derby's and Joan Wasser's voices. "Smooth Control" employed a pedal steel guitar.

== Critical reception ==
Professional ratings
Review scores
Source	Rating
AllMusic	4/5 stars
Robert Christgau	(2-star Honorable Mention)
The Encyclopedia of Popular Music	3/5 stars
MusicHound Rock: The Essential Album Guide	2.5/5 stars

Trouser Press wrote that "there are some good songs, and Derby does some nice things vocally—his falsetto on 'Down' would give Radiohead’s Thom Yorke a run for his money —but it’s a letdown from a band that has rarely disappointed in the past." SF Weekly thought that "Derby's lyrics alternately capture the urge to move (down the highway, into the stratosphere) and the realization that you're often literally or figuratively stuck in one space." The Nashville Scene deemed the album full of "bombastic would-be anthems and strained power ballads."

CMJ New Music Monthly called it "a crystal-clear confection of hooky, muscular guitar riffs and occasional flights of fiddle." The Boston Globe opined that the band "has shifted away from dissonance (good move) while retaining the punk, punch and power." The Wisconsin State Journal stated that the songs "coolly incorporate violins and creative guitar work to create a uniquely creepy, undeniably compelling rock sound."

AllMusic called the album "a raw, unpretentious indie masterpiece that seems to have had few champions."

== Track listing ==
No.	Title	Length
1.	"Smooth Control"
2.	"Special Ed"
3.	"Teenage Loser Anthem"
4.	"Drive By Kiss"
5.	"Lazy Eye"
6.	"Bending Machine"
7.	"Velocidad"
8.	"Rocket to the Moon"
9.	"Cosmonaut"
10.	"St. Tamarindo"
11.	"Down"
12.	"I Forget Myself"

== Personnel ==
- Dave Derby – vocals, bass
- Joan Wasser – violin
- Kevin March – drums
- Eric Masunaga – guitar
