= The Fair Rain =

English folk band

- Origin: Birmingham, England
- Genres: Folk
- Years active: 2006–present
- Label: Transition Records
- Members: Robin Beatty, Helen Lancaster, Charlie Heys, Jim Molyneux, Aaron Diaz, Laura Carter, Adam Jarvis
- Past members: Samantha Norman, Tom Chapman
- Website: Official website

The Fair Rain is an English seven-piece contemporary folk band. Until 13 October 2015, the band operated under the name The Old Dance School, under which they released three studio albums and a live album.

The Fair Rain released its first studio album, Behind The Glass, on 25 April 2016.

The band released three albums as The Old Dance School: Based on a True Story (2008), Forecast (2010) and Chasing The Light (2012) and one live album, Steer in the Night (2014). BBC Radio 2 has featured tracks from all three studio albums.

== Members ==
The band made up of Robin Beatty (guitar, vocals), Helen Lancaster (violin, viola), Charlie Heys (violin), Jim Molyneux (drums, percussion, accordion, vocals), Aaron Diaz (trumpet), Laura Carter (woodwind, vocals) and Adam Jarvis (double bass).

In January 2012, percussionist Tom Chapman, who features on all three recordings, was replaced by multi-instrumentalist Jim Molyneux.

In May 2015, violinist Samantha Norman, who also features on all previous albums, left the band and Charlie Heys joined in her place.

== Discography ==
Based on a True Story (2008)
Forecast (2010)
Chasing The Light (2012)
Steer in the Night (2014)
Behind The Glass (2016), as 'The Fair Rain'

== Performance history ==
The band has made many festival appearances including Glastonbury Festival, Celtic Connections, Shrewsbury Folk Festival, Towersey Folk Festival, Sidmouth Folk Festival, Moseley Folk Festival, Nordsjøfestivalen, Ile de Tatihou Festival, Shambala Festival, Knockengorroch, Warwick Folk Festival, Bromyard Folk Festival and Purbeck Folk Festival.
