= Against the Stars =

Studio album by the Dambuilders
- Released: July 29, 1997
- Recorded: Kevin March's basement
- Genre: Indie rock
- Length: 45:47
- Label: East West; Elektra
- Producer: Eric Masunaga

The Dambuilders chronology
Ruby Red (1995)	Against the Stars (1997)

Against the Stars is the sixth and final studio album by Boston-based indie rock band the Dambuilders, and their third for a major label. It was released on July 29, 1997, on East West and Elektra Records.

== Background and recording ==
Against the Stars was recorded in the basement of the Dambuilders' drummer, Kevin March, and produced by the band's guitarist, Eric Masunaga.

== Release and promotion ==
Against the Stars was released on July 29, 1997, on East West and Elektra Records. The album's first single was "Burn this Bridge". The song "Break Up With Your Boyfriend" was released as another single from the album on October 27, 1997. To promote it, the band collected fans' stories of their worst breakups via their website.

== Critical reception ==
Professional ratings
Review scores
Source	Rating
AllMusic	3/5 stars
Chicago Tribune	2.5/4 stars
Dayton Daily News	2.5/5 stars
Montreal Gazette	5/10
MusicHound Rock: The Essential Album Guide	4.5/5 stars

JT Griffith of AllMusic compared Against the Stars to the Dambuilders' previous albums, writing, "If Encendedor and Ruby Red were more akin to Sub Pop records, then Against the Stars is closer to Cheap Trick arena rock." Jim Sullivan of The Boston Globe was highly favorable in his assessment of the album, writing, "The 13 tracks show a mix of pop-craft smarts and art-rock leanings. There's variety and wit, bracing guitar and violin parts, and a keen sense of melody that is consistent throughout." Writing in the Hartford Courant, Roberto Gonzalez praised both the album and the band as a whole: "Intelligent, well-crafted and intense, Boston's Dambuilders create a swirling sound of violin and electric guitar, wrapped around a tight rhythm section. While their last album, "Ruby Red," was all prickly pop, their new effort displays their true influences." Mark Lepage of the Montreal Gazette was less favorable in his review. He gave the album a rating of 5 out of 10, quipping, "Decades of technological progress, and we get a new Missing Persons with Howard Jones fronting." Robert Levine, writing in the book MusicHound Rock, gave high praise to the album, saying that compared to the band's earlier works, it "…sounds seamless, effortless, and completely masterful."

== Track listing ==
All tracks are written by the Dambuilders.

No.	Title	Length
1.	"Digitize"	1:40
2.	"Break Up with Your Boyfriend"	2:34
3.	"Burn This Bridge"	3:19
4.	"Herstory"	3:55
5.	"You Might Want Me Around"	3:35
6.	"You'll Never Know"	3:54
7.	"Itch It"	2:25
8.	"Discopolis"	4:02
9.	"Luster"	4:17
10.	"I Was Wrong"	3:30
11.	"On the Slide"	2:48
12.	"Seek and Destroy"	3:24
13.	"Wished on the Wrong Star"	6:24
Total length:		45:47
