= The Little Unsaid =

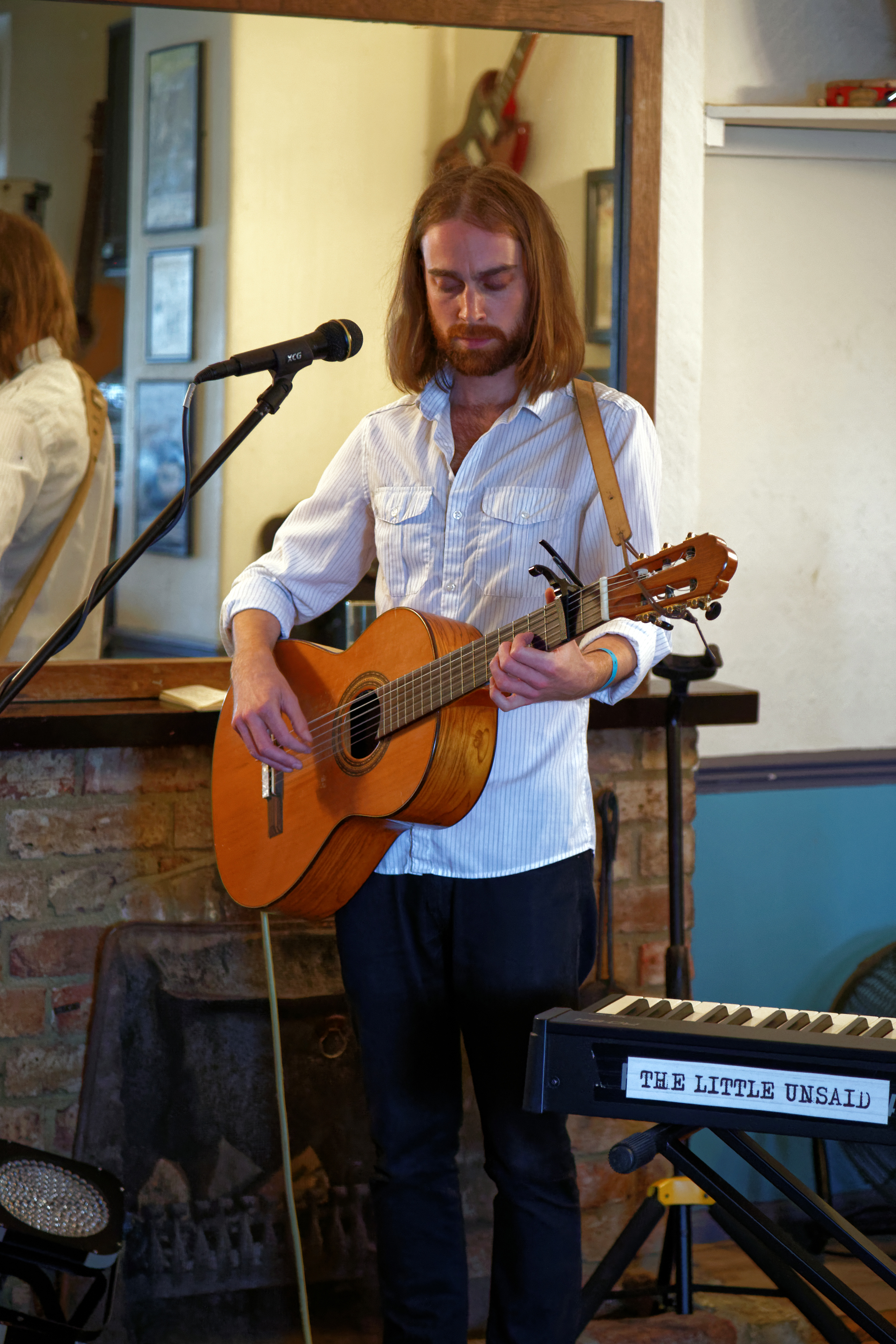
- The Little Unsaid at Broadstairs Folk Week 2016

Background information
- Born: John Elliott; 7 September 1987 (age 39); Dewsbury
- Origin: West Yorkshire
- Genres: Folk; Electronic; Alternative Rock
- Occupations: Singer-songwriter, arranger, producer, multi-instrumentalist
- Years active: 2010 - present
- Label: Carbon Moon; Reveal Records
- Website: thelittleunsaid.com

John Elliott, known by his stage and recording name The Little Unsaid, is an English songwriter, producer and multi-instrumentalist. He has released five studio albums and one EP of songs combining elements of alt-folk, electronica, alt-rock and string arrangements.

In September 2015 a crowd-funding campaign was completed using Pledge Music to finance the recording and release of the album Fisher King. The album was recorded in various locations in London, and was mixed by Graeme Stewart, producer of Jonny Greenwood's solo work and film music. The leading single from the album 'Can We Hear It?' was mixed by Mark Gardener of the shoegaze band Ride, during breaks from the band's 2015 world tour.

Elliott and his band released their fourth album Imagined Hymns & Chaingang Mantras in April 2017. Following the release, The Little Unsaid won the Steve Reid InNOVAtion Award, and subsequently signed with Reveal Records to release a compilation album of material spanning the band's career to date entitled Selected Works.

In May 2019 The Little Unsaid released their fifth studio album Atomise on Reveal Records.

== Discography ==
- Someone Else's Lullabies - Spare Dougal Records (2010)
- Dig for the Promise - Carbon Moon Records (2013)
- Dig for the Promise (Acoustic) - Carbon Moon Records (2013)
- A Filthy Hunger EP - Carbon Moon Records (2014)
- Electronic Sketches - Carbon Moon Records (2014)
- Fisher King - Carbon Moon Records (2016)
- Turn This World Into A Home - EP (2017)
- Imagined Hymns and Chaingang Mantras - Carbon Moon Records (April 2017)
- Selected Works - Reveal Records (2018)
- Atomise - Reveal Records (May 2019)
- Music & Nature - Reveal Records (November 2019)
- Lick the Future's Lips - Reveal Records (July 2021)
- Stay Fragile All Across This Cold Frontier (26 September 2026)
