= Lau (band) =

British folk band

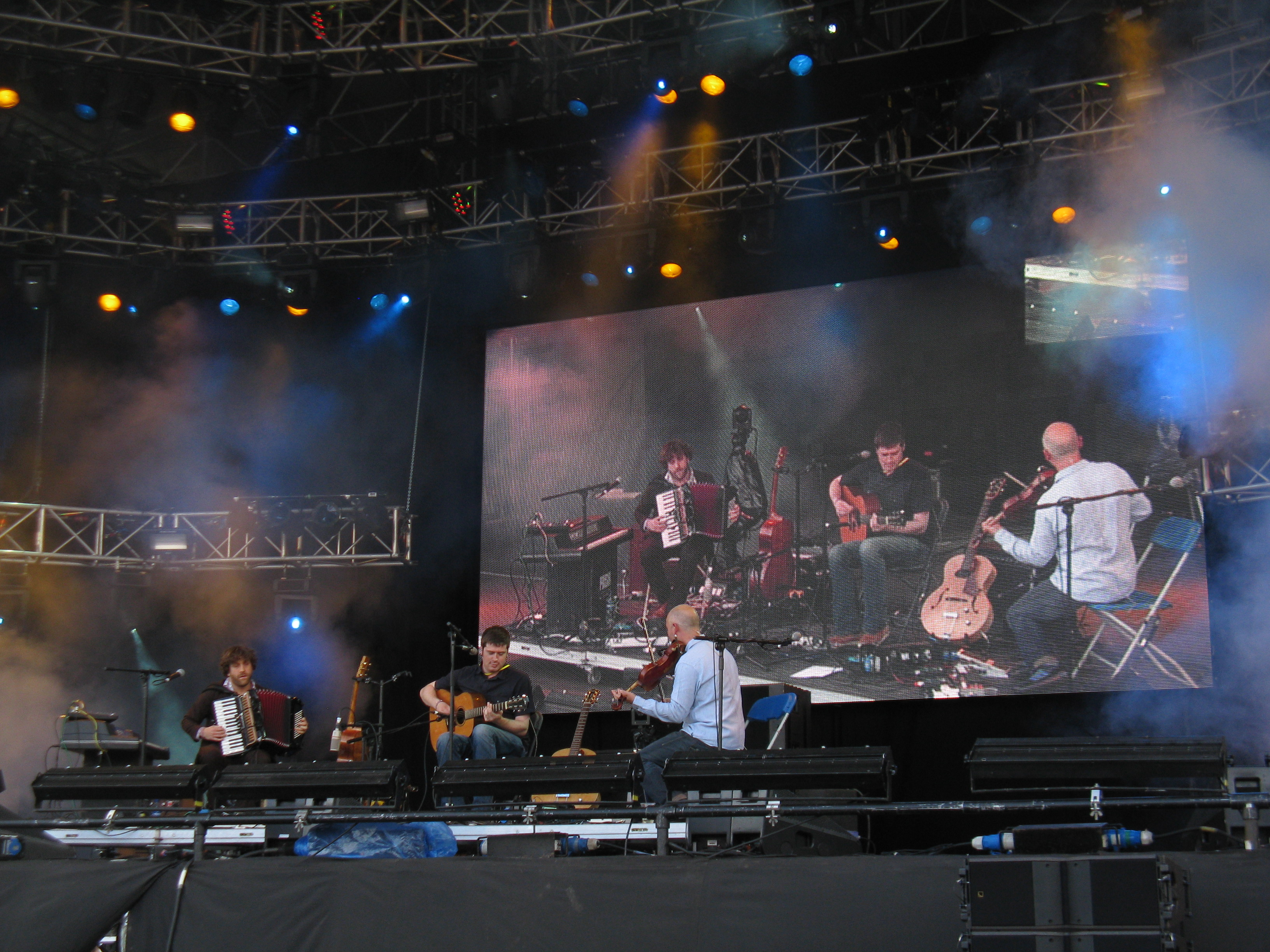
- Lau at the 2011 Cropredy Festival

Background information
- Origin: United Kingdom
- Genres: Folk; Celtic folk
- Years active: 2005–present
- Labels: Reveal Records; Navigator Records
- Members: Kris Drever; Martin Green; Aidan O'Rourke
- Website: Official site

Lau is a British folk band from both Scotland and England, formed in 2005. Named after an Orcadian word meaning "natural light", the band is composed of Kris Drever (guitar, vocals), Martin Green (accordion, piano, electronics) and Aidan O'Rourke (fiddle). To date, the band has released five studio albums, several EPs, and two live albums.

== Origins ==
Their debut album, Lightweights and Gentlemen, was released through Reveal Records in 2007. The band subsequently won the "Best Group" at the BBC Folk Awards, 2008 and went on to receive the award the next two years running.

== Recordings ==
In December 2007, Lau recorded a live set at the Bongo Club, Edinburgh, and in early 2008, released Live. In 2008, they appeared at the Winnipeg Folk Festival, Vancouver Festival and the Calgary Folk Festival.

In 2009, they released the album Arc Light. In 2010, the group recorded and released a five-track EP, Evergreen, in collaboration with singer-songwriter Karine Polwart.

The band released their third album Race the Loser in 2012. They also appeared on the BBC show Later... with Jools Holland in 2012 where they performed the song "Torsa".

John Parish produced the album Midnight and Closedown in 2019.

== Discography ==
=== Studio albums ===
- Lightweights and Gentlemen (2007)
- Arc Light (2009)
- Race the Loser (2012)
- The Bell That Never Rang (2015)
- Midnight and Closedown (2019)

=== EPs ===
- Evergreen (credited to Lau vs Karine Polwart, 2010)
- Ghosts (credited to Lau vs Adem, 2011)
- Live Series 1.0 (2020)

=== Compilations ===
- Decade (The Best of 2007-2017) (2017)

=== Live ===
- Live (2008)
- Unplugged (2020)

=== Other appearances ===
- "Dear Prudence" on Mojo Presents: The White Album Recovered
