= Reveal Records =

British independent record label

- Founded: 2006
- Founder: Tom Rose
- Country of origin: U.K.
- Location: Derby, England
- Official website: revealrecords.co.uk

Reveal Records is a British independent record label. It began as an independent record store in Derby, England.

== History ==
The record store was opened by Tom Rose in 1999. The store reached its peak in 2005/2006 when it sold virtually every genre of music available on three floors, as well as operating an online outlet. It won Music Week's 'Best Independent Music Retailer' award in 2005. At this time the music industry was experiencing a decline in sales of physical music formats including CDs, and this was one of the reasons that led to the closure of Reveal Records' retail outlet in 2007.

Reveal Records, launched in 2006, continued as a record label after the demise of the store. In March 2017 it marked its ten-year anniversary with a concert at Pocklington Arts Centre, Pocklington, that included label artists. Reveal Records also books concerts and represents artists for publishing and agency work.

== Notable artists ==
The label released firstly music from Joan As Police Woman and the Scottish folk singer/guitarist, Kris Drever in 2006. Further releases included those by A Camp, Lau, Gramercy Arms, Madam, Poppy & the Jezebels, Eddi Reader, Boo Hewerdine, Dan Whitehouse, The Little Unsaid. and in 2021 signed, Duncan Lloyd and Withered Hand.

== See also ==
- Lists of record labels
