= Captain (disambiguation) =

Captain is a rank or title for commander of a military unit, commander of a ship or other vessel, or leader of a unit or organization.

Captain, Captains, or, the Captain, may also refer to:

== Rank ==
- Captain (armed forces), a commissioned officer rank historically corresponding to the command of a company of soldiers
- Captain (naval), rank corresponding to command of the largest ships in English-speaking navies
- Captain (Canadian army and air force)
- Captain (D) or Captain Destroyers, a shore-based commander in the Royal Navy of the United Kingdom
  - Captain (D) afloat, a related rank
- Group captain, senior commissioned rank in the air forces of many countries
- Sea captain, high grade licensed mariner in ultimate command of the vessel
- Kapitän, shortened version of several ranks in the German navy
- Pilot in command, the lead pilot on an aircraft

== Film and television ==
- Captain (1994 film), a Telugu-Tamil bilingual film
- Captain (1999 film), a Malayalam film
- Captain (2018 film), a Malayalam film
- Captain (2019 film), a Nepalese film
- Captain (2022 film), a Tamil-language film
- The Captain (1946 film), a French film
- The Captain (1971 film), a German film
- The Captain (2017 film), a German film
- The Captain (2019 film), a Chinese film
- The Captain (miniseries), a 2022 American television miniseries
- Welcome to The Captain, previously known as The Captain, an American sitcom
- The Captains (film), a 2011 documentary about captains in the Star Trek series
- "The Captain" (Ray Donovan), a 2014 television episode
- Captain, a non-rail vehicle in Thomas & Friends
- The Captain, a minor character in The Hitchhiker's Guide to the Galaxy
- The Captain, the main character in Captain Kangaroo
- Vijayakanth or Captain, Indian actor

== Literature ==
- The Captain (play), a 1647 stage play by Francis Beaumont and John Fletcher
- The Captain (novel), a 1967 novel by Jan de Hartog
- The Captain (magazine), a British magazine for boys

=== Comics and manga ===
- Captain (Hellsing), a character from the Hellsing manga and OVA
- Captain (manga), a 1972 baseball manga series by Akio Chiba
- Captain (comics), a satiric superhero from the comic book Nextwave
- The Captain, an alias adopted by Steve Rogers in the storyline Captain America: The Captain.

== Music ==
=== Artists and composers ===
- Captain (band), a London-based alternative rock band
- The Captains (band), a Japanese rock band
- Daryl Dragon or Captain, part of Captain & Tennille
- Carl Fontana or the Captain, American jazz trombonist
- Markus Kaarlonen or Captain, Finnish musician
- Sergey Kuryokhin or the Captain, Russian composer
- Saki Shimizu or Captain, J-pop singer

=== Albums ===
- Captain (album), a 1998 album by Idlewild
- The Captain (album), the 1999 album by Kasey Chambers

=== Songs ===
- "The Captain" (Kasey Chambers song) (1999)
- "The Captain" (Biffy Clyro song) (2009)
- "The Captain" (Leonard Cohen song) (1984)
- "The Captain" (Guster song) (2006)
- "The Captain" (The Knife song) (2006)
- "Captain", by Wiz Khalifa; see Wiz Khalifa discography
- "Captain", by Ween from their 2003 album Quebec

== Ships ==
- HMS Captain (1678), a 70-gun third rate
- HMS Captain (1743), a 70-gun third rate
- HMS Captain (1787), a 74-gun third rate
- HMS Carnatic (1783), a 72-gun third rate renamed Captain in 1815
- HMS Royal Sovereign (1786), a 100-gun first rate renamed Captain in 1825
- HMS Agincourt (1865), an iron screw ship that was to have been named Captain
- HMS Captain (1869), a masted turret ship
- Captain-class frigate, a class of Royal Navy frigates

== Sports ==
- Captain (sports), the leader of an athletic team
  - Captain (association football), a member chosen to be the on-pitch leader of the team
  - Captain (Australian rules football), a player who has several additional roles and responsibilities
  - Captain (baseball), an honorary title sometimes given to a member of the team to acknowledge his leadership
  - Captain (cricket), the appointed leader of a team
  - Captain (ice hockey), the player authorized to speak with the game officials regarding rule interpretations
  - Captain (volleyball), leader of the team on court and liaison between the coaches, players and referee.
- Captains, the sports teams of Christopher Newport University
- "The Captain", a nickname for hockey player Steve Yzerman
- "The Captain", a nickname for baseball player Derek Jeter

== Other uses ==
- Captain (videotex), a Japanese videotex system, operational from 1983 to 2002
- Marion 6360, a power shovel known as "the Captain"
- "The Captain", a nickname for the fascist Iron Guard leader Corneliu Zelea Codreanu
- Captain (restaurant), responsible for interacting with guests and directing waiters
- "Captain", a nickname for Captain Amarinder Singh, former Chief Minister of Punjab

== See also ==
- HMS Captain, a list of Royal Navy ships
- First Captain (disambiguation)
- Second Captain (disambiguation)
- CAPT (disambiguation)
- CPT (disambiguation)
- Capitaine (disambiguation)
- Capitan (disambiguation)
- Capitano (disambiguation)
- Chieftain (disambiguation)
- El Capitan (disambiguation), Spanish for "the Captain"
- Il Capitano, a masked character from the commedia dell'arte
- Kapitan (disambiguation)
- Kaptan (disambiguation)
