= Scottish Fiction: Best of 1997–2007 =

Greatest hits album by Idlewild
- Released: 1 October 2007
- Recorded: 1997–2007
- Genre: Rock
- Label: Parlophone/EMI

Idlewild chronology
| Make Another World (2007) | Scottish Fiction: Best of 1997–2007 (2007) | A Distant History: Rarities 1997–2007 (2007) |

Professional ratings
Review scores
| Source | Rating |
|---|---|
| AllMusic | 3.5/5 stars |
| Pitchfork Media | 7.7/10 |
| Q | (November 2007, p. 155) |
| Rocklouder | 4/5 stars |
| stv.tv | 4/5 stars |

Scottish Fiction: Best of 1997–2007 is a best-of compilation album by Scottish rock band Idlewild, released on 1 October 2007 through Parlophone. The album was released following Idlewild's split from Parlophone/EMI, and, as a result, only features two songs from 2007's Make Another World, which was released through Sequel Records.

A limited-edition version of the album was released which included a DVD. The DVD featured a documentary on the band, a live concert recorded in Aberdeen during 2007's Make Another World tour, and all the band's promotional videos.

The album entered the UK Album Chart at #79.

== CD track listing ==
1. "You Held the World in Your Arms" – 3:23
2. "No Emotion" – 3:05
3. "Roseability" – 3:40
4. "When I Argue I See Shapes" – 4:25
5. "Love Steals Us from Loneliness" – 3:14
6. "American English" – 4:35
7. "These Wooden Ideas" – 3:54
8. "El Capitan" – 3:57
9. "A Modern Way of Letting Go" – 2:25
10. "Let Me Sleep (Next to the Mirror)" – 3:23
11. "I'm a Message" – 2:31
12. "In Remote Part/Scottish Fiction" – 3:50
13. "I Understand It" – 3:21
14. "Little Discourage" – 3:11
15. "As if I Hadn't Slept" – 3:37
16. "Live in a Hiding Place" – 3:16
17. "Make Another World" – 4:08

== Music for Documentary: Interludes Between Live Songs ==
1. "Scottish Fiction" (alternative version 2002)
2. "A Distant History"
3. "Safe and Sound" (recording studio audio 1998)
4. "'demo tape scratchings'" (1999)
5. "Let Me Sleep (Next to the Mirror)" (demo version 1999)
6. "In Words We Walk On" (unreleased demo 2004)
7. "I'm Happy to Be Here Tonight" (acoustic live version at Newbury comics, Boston MA 2003)
8. "We Live for Fate" (unreleased demo 2004)
9. "Gone Too Long"
10. "Easier to Learn" (unreleased demo 2001)
11. "These Wooden Ideas" (acoustic version live at Virgin Megastore, London 2002)
12. "Palace Flophouse
13. "Maybe I'm Saying This to Someone" (unreleased demo 2004)
14. "I Misunderstood" (unreleased demo 2004)
15. "'unnamed noisy song'" (unreleased demo 2004)
16. "Logic Always Dictates" (unreleased demo 2001)
17. "I Understand It" (recording studio audio 2004)
18. "Royal Glue" (unreleased demo 2004)
19. "Actually It's Darkness" (acoustic version 2000)
20. "Love Steals Us From Loneliness" (acoustic version live at the Shaw Theatre, London 2005)
21. "Make Another World"
22. "Someone, Somewhere" (unreleased demo 2004)
23. "Roseability" (demo version 1999)
