= CPT =

CPT or Cpt may also stand for:

== Biochemistry ==
- Carnitine palmitoyltransferase I (CPT1A, CPT1, CPT1-L, L-CPT1), a mitochondrial enzyme responsible for the formation of acyl carnitines
- Carboxypeptidase T, a hydrolytic enzyme

=== Medicine ===
- 8-Cyclopentyl-1,3-dimethylxanthine (8-CPT), a stimulant drug
- Camptothecin, an anti-cancer drug
- Certified Personal Trainer, a personal trainer with a varying degree of knowledge of general fitness
- Chest physiotherapy
- Cognitive processing therapy, a psychotherapeutic approach
- Continuous Performance Task, measurement of attention
- Current Procedural Terminology, AMA medical code set
- Troparil (β-CPT), a dopamine reuptake inhibitor
- Congenital pseudarthrosis of the tibia, a rare pediatric disease

== Computing ==
- CPT (file format), of Corel Photo Paint and others
- CPT Corporation, a 20th-century word processor manufacturer

== Politics ==
- Community Peacemaker Teams, organisation supporting peace workers in conflict areas around the world
- Committee for the Prevention of Torture, Council of Europe
- Communist Party of Thailand, 1942-1990s
- Paraguayan Workers Confederation (Confederación Paraguaya de Trabajadores)

== Science and mathematics ==
- Canadian Penning Trap Mass Spectrometer, at Argonne National Laboratory
- Conditional probability table
- Cone penetration test, to determine properties of soils
- Coprecipitation, an important process in analytical chemistry and radiochemistry
- CPT symmetry (charge, parity, and time symmetry) of physical laws
- Cumulative prospect theory in economic modeling

== Sports ==
- Capcom Pro Tour, an annual series of Street Fighter tournaments
- Collegiate Pickleball Tour, an American series of college sport competitions

== Telecommunications ==
- CPT (programadora), a defunct Colombian television production company
- Columbia Pictures Television, branch of Columbia Pictures
- CBS Paramount Television, former name of CBS Studios
- Connecticut Public Television, PBS network affiliate network for the U.S. state of Connecticut
- Compañía Peruana de Teléfonos, Peruvian public telecommunications company

== Transport ==
- Cape Town International Airport, South Africa, IATA airport code
- Cipatat railway station, ID, station code
- Clapton railway station, UK, station code
- Confederation of Passenger Transport, advocacy organization in the United Kingdom
- Corporate Air, Montana, US, ICAO airline designator
- Crib Point railway station, Melbourne
- Carriage Paid To, an International Commercial Term used in transport

== Other uses ==
- An abbreviation for Compton, California
- Colored people's time, offensive US expression for lateness
- Cost per thousand, advertising term
- Curricular Practical Training, US temporary employment authorization
- Pastoral Land Commission, a Catholic environmental group in Brazil that helped found the Landless Workers Movement
- Cpt., an abbreviation for captain

== See also ==
- Captain (disambiguation)
