= Kroppenstedtia =

Scientific classification
- Domain: Bacteria
- Kingdom: Bacillati
- Phylum: Bacillota
- Class: Bacilli
- Order: Caryophanales
- Family: Thermoactinomycetaceae
- Genus: Kroppenstedtia von Jan et al. 2011

Type species
- Kroppenstedtia eburnea von Jan et al. 2011

Species
- K. eburnea; K. guangzhouensis; K. pulmonis; K. sanguinis

Genus of bacteria

Kroppenstedtia is a bacterial genus from the family Thermoactinomycetaceae.

== Phylogeny ==
The currently accepted taxonomy is based on the List of Prokaryotic names with Standing in Nomenclature (LPSN) and National Center for Biotechnology Information (NCBI).

16S rRNA based LTP_10_2024

- - - Kroppenstedtia
      - P. pulmonis Bell et al. 2016
      - - P. sanguinis Bell et al. 2016
        - - K. eburnea von Jan et al. 2011
          - K. guangzhouensis Yang et al. 2013
  - - Paludifilum
    - - Desmospora
      - - Salinithrix
        - Marininema

120 marker proteins based GTDB 09-RS220

- - - - Kroppenstedtia
        - K. eburnea
        - K. guangzhouensis
    - Melghirimyces
  - - - Kroppenstedtia pulmonis
      - Paludifilum
    - - Desmospora
      - Marininema
