= Polycladomyces abyssicola =

Scientific classification
- Domain: Bacteria
- Kingdom: Bacillati
- Phylum: Bacillota
- Class: Bacilli
- Order: Caryophanales
- Family: Thermoactinomycetaceae
- Genus: Polycladomyces
- Species: P. abyssicola

Binomial name
- Polycladomyces abyssicola Tsubouchi et al. 2013

Type strain
- CECT 8074, JCM 18147, JIR-001

Species of bacterium

Polycladomyces abyssicola is a Gram-positive, aerobic, heterotrophic, thermophilic and non-motile bacterium from the genus of Planifilum which has been isolated from hemipelagic sediments from deep seawater.
