= El Capitan (disambiguation) =

El Capitan (accented Capitán, "The Captain" in Spanish) is the name of a rock formation in Yosemite National Park, California.

El Capitan may also refer to:

== Locations ==
- Agathla Peak, a peak south of Monument Valley, Arizona, is also known as El Capitan
- Pike's Peak, previously named El Capitan by early Spanish explorers
- El Capitan (Idaho), a peak in the Sawtooth Range, Blaine County, Idaho
- El Capitan (Mars), a rock on the planet Mars
- El Capitan (San Diego), a peak in East County, California, US
- El Capitan (Texas), a mountain in Guadalupe Mountains National Park, Texas, US
- El Capitan Dam, San Diego River, California, US
- El Capitan Reservoir or Lake, a reservoir in central San Diego County, California, US
- El Capitán State Beach, California, US
- El Capitan (Montana), a peak in the Bitterroot Range of western Montana, US
- El Capitan Pit, Prince of Wales Island, Alaska, the deepest limestone pit in the US

== Buildings ==
=== Schools ===
- El Capitan (Arizona school), a public high school in Colorado City, Arizona
- El Capitan High School, Lakeside, California
- El Capitan High School, Merced, California

=== Theatres ===
- El Capitan Theatre, Hollywood, California
- Avalon Hollywood (Hollywood, California), formerly El Capitan Theatre
- Playhouse Theatre (Portland, Oregon), formerly El Capitan Theatre
- El Capitan Theatre and Hotel, San Francisco, California
- El Capitan Entertainment Centre, formerly Hollywood Masonic Temple, Hollywood, California

== Transportation ==
- SS El Capitan, a cargo ship of Southern Pacific Company's Atlantic Steamship Lines (Morgan Line), serving as USS El Capitan (ID-1407) briefly in World War I and finally lost in World War II after dispersal of Convoy PQ 17
- SS El Capitan (1923), a Design 1049 cargo ship, previously Meridan and later USS Majaba serving through World War II now a dive site in Subic Bay, Philippines
- El Capitan (ferry), a San Francisco Bay ferry from 1868 to 1925
- El Capitan (train), a named passenger train

== Films and TV ==
- El Capitan (film), a 1978 film directed and produced by Fred Padula
- El Capitan (DuckTales), a villain from Disney's animated television series DuckTales

== Music ==
- El Capitan (operetta), composed by John Philip Sousa in 1896
  - "El Capitan" (march), comprising themes from the Sousa operetta
- "El Capitan" (Idlewild song), by Scottish indie band Idlewild
- "El Capitan" (OPM song), a song by Californian-based band OPM
- El Capitan, album by Tony Pabón 1974
- El Capitan, album by Utah Phillips 1975
- "El Capitán", mambo by Tony Pabón

== Other uses ==
- "El Capitan" (supercomputer), located at Lawrence Livermore National Laboratory
- El Capitan Books, a publisher of independent comic books and graphic novels
- OS X El Capitan, the twelfth major release of the Mac OS X operating system from Apple Inc.
- Texas Derby, a.k.a. El Capitan series, an annual soccer competition between Texas teams Houston Dynamo and FC Dallas

== See also ==
- Captain (disambiguation)
- Capitan (disambiguation)
- Kapitan (disambiguation)
- Kapitän
- Katepano
- Il Capitano
