= Kroppenstedtia guangzhouensis =

Scientific classification
- Domain: Bacteria
- Kingdom: Bacillati
- Phylum: Bacillota
- Class: Bacilli
- Order: Caryophanales
- Family: Thermoactinomycetaceae
- Genus: Kroppenstedtia
- Species: K. guangzhouensis

Binomial name
- Kroppenstedtia guangzhouensis Yang et al. 2013

Type strain
- CGMCC 1.12404, KCTC 29149, GD02

Species of bacterium

Kroppenstedtia guangzhouensis is a Gram-positive, spore-forming, filamentous and aerobic bacterium from the genus Kroppenstedtia which has been isolated from soil from China.
