= Marininema halotolerans =

Scientific classification
- Domain: Bacteria
- Kingdom: Bacillati
- Phylum: Bacillota
- Class: Bacilli
- Order: Caryophanales
- Family: Thermoactinomycetaceae
- Genus: Marininema
- Species: M. halotolerans

Binomial name
- Marininema halotolerans Zhang et al. 2013

Type strain
- CCTCC AB 2012052, DSM 45789, YIM M11385

Species of bacterium

Marininema halotolerans is a Gram-positive bacterium from the genus Marininema which has been isolated from marine sediments from the Little Andaman Island from the Indian Ocean.
