= Desmospora profundinema =

Scientific classification
- Domain: Bacteria
- Kingdom: Bacillati
- Phylum: Bacillota
- Class: Bacilli
- Order: Caryophanales
- Family: Thermoactinomycetaceae
- Genus: Desmospora
- Species: D. profundinema

Binomial name
- Desmospora profundinema Zhang et al. 2015

Type strain
- DSM 45903, NBRC 109626, SCSIO 11154

Species of bacterium

Desmospora profundinema is a bacterium from the genus Desmospora which has been isolated from deep-sea sediments from the Indian Ocean near China.
