= Melghirimyces algeriensis =

Scientific classification
- Domain: Bacteria
- Kingdom: Bacillati
- Phylum: Bacillota
- Class: Bacilli
- Order: Caryophanales
- Family: Thermoactinomycetaceae
- Genus: Melghirimyces
- Species: M. algeriensis

Binomial name
- Melghirimyces algeriensis Addou et al. 2012

Type strain
- CCUG 59620, DSM 45474, NariEX

Species of bacterium

Melghirimyces algeriensis is a Gram-positive, halotolerant, thermotolerant and aerobic bacterium from the genus Melghirimyces which has been isolated from the salt lake Chott Melrhir in Algeria.
