= Planifilum fulgidum =

Scientific classification
- Domain: Bacteria
- Kingdom: Bacillati
- Phylum: Bacillota
- Class: Bacilli
- Order: Caryophanales
- Family: Thermoactinomycetaceae
- Genus: Planifilum
- Species: P. fulgidum

Binomial name
- Planifilum fulgidum Hatayama et al. 2005

Type strain
- 500275, ATCC BAA-970, BCRC 16828, CCRC 16828, DSM 44945, JCM 12508

Species of bacterium

Planifilum fulgidum is a Gram-positive and thermophilic bacterium from the genus of Planifilum which has been isolated from hyperthermal compost in Japan.
