= Seinonella peptonophila =

Scientific classification
- Domain: Bacteria
- Kingdom: Bacillati
- Phylum: Bacillota
- Class: Bacilli
- Order: Caryophanales
- Family: Thermoactinomycetaceae
- Genus: Seinonella
- Species: S. peptonophila

Binomial name
- Seinonella peptonophila (Nonomura and Ohara 1971) Yoon et al. 2005

Type strain
- ATCC 27302, DSM 44666, JCM 10113, KCTC 9740, T-2

Synonyms
- Thermoactinomyces peptonophilus

Species of bacterium

Seinonella peptonophila is a bacterium from the genus Seinonella which has been isolated from soil in Japan.
