= Planifilum yunnanense =

Scientific classification
- Domain: Bacteria
- Kingdom: Bacillati
- Phylum: Bacillota
- Class: Bacilli
- Order: Caryophanales
- Family: Thermoactinomycetaceae
- Genus: Planifilum
- Species: P. yunnanense

Binomial name
- Planifilum yunnanense Zhang et al., 2007

Type strain
- CCTCC AA206002, KCTC 13052, LA5

Synonyms
- Planifilum yunnanesis

Species of bacterium

Planifilum yunnanense is a thermophilic bacterium from the genus of Planifilum which has been isolated from a hot spring in Yunnan in China.
