= Katepano =

Senior Byzantine military rank

Map of the administrative structure of the Byzantine Empire in 1025. The regional eastern commands, variously under doukes or katepano, are outlined. Southern Italy was under the authority of the katepano of Italy, while Bulgaria, Serbia and Paristrion were often under the authority of a single katepano.

The katepánō (Greek: κατεπάνω, lit. '[the one] placed at the top' or 'the topmost') was a senior Byzantine military rank and office. The word was Latinized as capetanus/catepan, and its meaning seems to have merged with that of the Italian "capitaneus" (which derives from the Latin word "caput", meaning head). This hybridized term gave rise to the English language term captain and its equivalents in other languages (Capitan, Kapitan, Kapitän, Capitán, Capitano, Kapudan Pasha, etc.)

== History ==
The katepáno first appears in the 9th century, when it was used in the generic sense of "the one in charge" by two officials: the head of the basilikoi anthrōpoi ("imperial men"), a class of low-level court functionaries, and the head of the Mardaites marine detachments of the Byzantine naval theme of the Cibyrrhaeots in southern Asia Minor. On the eve of the great eastern conquests of the 960s, however, the title acquired a more specific meaning.

The reconquered frontier zones were divided into smaller themata, and grouped together to form large regional commands, headed either by a doux ("duke") or a katepanō. These were the ducates/katepanates of Antioch, covering the south-eastern frontier in northern Syria, of Mesopotamia in the east around the Euphrates, and of Chaldia in the north-east. During the reign of Emperor Basil II (r. 976–1025), the eastern border was further expanded, and the katepanate of Iberia was established in 1022.

In the West, the most famous katepanate, that of southern Italy, is attested in the Escorial Taktikon, a list of offices compiled circa 971–975, and after the successful conclusion of the Byzantine–Bulgarian Wars, a katepanō of Bulgaria is also attested. A Serbian catepanate is also attested, which was known as the "katepano of Ras".

With the catastrophic territorial losses suffered during the 11th century, the office disappears in the sense of the overall military commander, but is retained in a more local level: during the Komnenian and Palaiologan periods, the term katepanikion thus comes to denote low-level administrative areas, both in Asia Minor (including the Empire of Trebizond) and Europe.

These were small subdivisions of the earlier themata, and consisted of little more than a fortified capital (the kastron) and its surrounding territory. In the Palaiologan era, the katepanikion was governed by a kephalē (Greek: κεφαλή, "head"), who had supreme civil and military authority within its bounds. Like many other Byzantine institutions, the katepanikion as an administrative subdivision was also adopted in the Second Bulgarian Empire.

== See also ==
- Capitan (disambiguation)
- Captain (disambiguation)
- El Capitan (disambiguation)
- Catepanate of Serbia

== Sources ==
- Bartusis, Mark C. (1997). The Late Byzantine Army: Arms and Society 1204–1453. Philadelphia, Pennsylvania: University of Pennsylvania Press. ISBN 0-8122-1620-2.
- Haldon, John (1999). Warfare, State and Society in the Byzantine World, 565–1204. London: UCL Press. ISBN 1-85728-495-X.
- Holmes, Catherine (2005). Basil II and the Governance of Empire (976–1025). Oxford: Oxford University Press. ISBN 978-0-19-927968-5.
- Kazhdan, Alexander, ed. (1991). The Oxford Dictionary of Byzantium. Oxford and New York: Oxford University Press. ISBN 0-19-504652-8.
- Krsmanović, Bojana (2008). The Byzantine Province in Change: On the Threshold Between the 10th and the 11th Century. Belgrade: Institute for Byzantine Studies. ISBN 9789603710608.
- Ostrogorsky, George (1956). History of the Byzantine State. Oxford: Basil Blackwell.
- Runciman, Steven (1988) [1929]. The Emperor Romanus Lecapenus and His Reign: A Study of Tenth-Century Byzantium. Cambridge University Press. ISBN 9780521357227.
