= Laceyella putida =

Scientific classification
- Domain: Bacteria
- Kingdom: Bacillati
- Phylum: Bacillota
- Class: Bacilli
- Order: Caryophanales
- Family: Thermoactinomycetaceae
- Genus: Laceyella
- Species: L. putida'

Binomial name
- Laceyella putida' (Lacey and Cross 1989) Yoon et al. 2005

Type strain
- Agre N.S. 927, ATCC 49853, CUB 927, DSM 44608, IMET 9217, JCM 8091, KCTC 3666, LMG 21519, NCIB 12324, NCIMB 12324, Sea37, VKM Ac-1431

Synonyms
- Thermoactinomyces putidus

Species of bacterium

Laceyella putida is a bacterium from the genus Laceyella. Laceyella putida produces chitinase.
