= Laceyella sediminis =

Scientific classification
- Domain: Bacteria
- Kingdom: Bacillati
- Phylum: Bacillota
- Class: Bacilli
- Order: Caryophanales
- Family: Thermoactinomycetaceae
- Genus: Laceyella
- Species: L. sediminis

Binomial name
- Laceyella sediminis Chen et al. 2012

Type strain
- CCTCC AA 208058, DSM 45263, RHA1

Species of bacterium

Laceyella sediminis is a thermophilic bacterium from the genus Laceyella which has been isolated from sediments from a hot spring in Tengchong in China.
