= Kroppenstedtia eburnea =

Scientific classification
- Domain: Bacteria
- Kingdom: Bacillati
- Phylum: Bacillota
- Class: Bacilli
- Order: Caryophanales
- Family: Thermoactinomycetaceae
- Genus: Kroppenstedtia
- Species: K. eburnea

Binomial name
- Kroppenstedtia eburnea von Jan et al. 2011

Type strain
- CCUG 59226, DSM 45196, JFMB-ATE, NRRL B-24804

Species of bacterium

Kroppenstedtia eburnea is a Gram-positive, spore-forming, filamentous and aerobic bacterium from the genus Kroppenstedtia which has been isolated from patient samples.
