= Captain Jan =

Book by Jan de Hertog

Captain Jan: a Story of Ocean Tugboats
- First edition (Dutch)
- Author: Jan de Hartog
- Original title: Hollands Glorie, roman van de zeesleepvaart
- Translator: Carlos Peacock
- Language: en
- Subject: Tugboats
- Genre: Novel
- Publisher: Elsevier, Cleaver-Hume Press
- Publication date: 1940
- English publication date: 1954
- Pages: 434
- ISBN: 978-0933852839
- OCLC: 31766673
- Dewey Decimal: 823/.914
- LC Class: PR6015.A674 C3
- Website: archive.org/details/captain00deha/ via Internet Archive

Captain Jan (Dutch: Hollands Glorie) is a 1940 novel by Dutch writer Jan de Hartog. The book depicts highly skilled tugboat sailors as modern successors to the bold navigators of the Dutch Golden Age. It was made into a Dutch TV series in 1976.

To some degree, the fictional company depicted in the book is inspired by the real-life tugboat shipping company Smit-Wijsmüller, with which de Hartog took a temporary job at in IJmuiden a few months before the German invasion - which quickly came to an end when the tug was captured by the Germans.

At the time of writing the book was already a historical novel, depicting a time before the author's birth which already had a certain romantic patina. De Hartog's work at the Port of Amsterdam might have given him a chance to meet with old sailors of the protagonists' generation and hear their reminiscences.

The book was published in October 1940, five months after Nazi Germany invaded and swiftly occupied the hitherto-neutral Netherlands. Under these circumstances, a book with such a name and theme became an immediate best seller in occupied Holland, a potent symbol of Dutch opposition to the occupation. As noted by The New Netherland Institute, "(...)The book became a best seller overnight and sustained the Dutch population during the five-year military occupation and suffering under the hated Nazi regime. It is estimated that over a million copies of 'Holland’s Glory' were sold during the war time period. Considering that the entire Dutch population then was well under 10 million, the one million copies sold is an enormous number. ".

In fact, the book's plot as such had nothing political, anti-German or anti-Nazi, the sailor protagonists' conflict being mainly with nature and with the exploiting, authoritarian Kwel Shipping Company which demands feudal-like fealty from its employees. This did not stop the Gestapo from showing a lively interest in its author, forcing him to go into hiding and then escape to England in 1943. As for the book itself - despite its being banned by the Nazis, clandestine printing presses continued to turn the book out in huge numbers.

== Plot summary ==
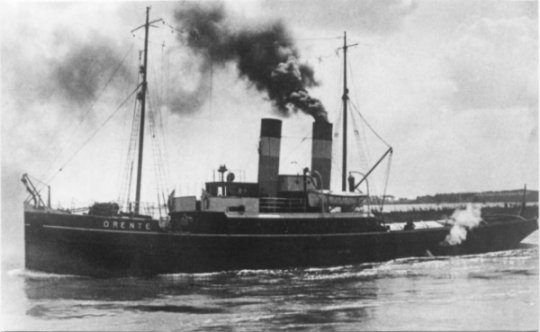
The real-life tugboat Titan (later Drente), in ongoing service between 1894 and 1935, is similar to the boats in which Jan Wandelaar sailed.

In the 1890s and 1900s, the Netherlands saw the fast flourishing of a new kind of shipping: ocean-going tugboats. While hitherto tugboats were strictly local affairs, never going out of sight of shore, the new kind were regularly crossing the oceans, towing Dutch-made dredgers, floating cranes, lighters and sluice gates to Asia, Africa and South America - wherever Dutch engineers were busily building harbors and damming rivers.

These tugboats became the source of intense Dutch national pride - "Holland's Glory" of the original title. Tugboats captains were elevated to the status of national heroes, newspapers reported on their exploits and boys collected the photos of captains and dreamed of becoming one of them. The book tells of Jan Wandelaar, a boy who grew up to realize that dream - though at a harsh price.

Jan Wandelaar, the only child of a fisherman's widow, started as a deckhand on a paddleboat on the internal and coastal waters of North Holland. During an accident he saved the ship. This drew the attention of the owner, Mijnheer van Munster, who encouraged him to study for a Mate's certificate. During the examination Jan's girlfriend Nellie, the lock-keeper's daughter, was waiting until he emerged to tell her that he had passed. Jan's future seemed assured - he would be an officer on a deep-sea tugboat, and earn enough to marry Nellie and buy a house.

Aged twenty-four, Jan got a berth as the mate of the Jan van Gent, under the famous Captain Siemonov - a Russian long resident in the Netherlands - on an eight-month long voyage to take a dredger to Valparaíso, Chile. Jan gets along well with his Captain and shipmates. During a stopover in Brazil, where the Dutch Brazilian community gave the visiting sailors a hero's welcome, with some difficulty, the newly married Jan resisted the energetic seduction attempt of a beautiful Dutch-Brazilian girl.

However, having rounded Cape Horn, Jan and his shipmates found unsettling news waiting for them at their Chilean destination. Their shipping company was taken over by Kwel - an aggressive, predatory company seeking to establish a monopoly in the tugboat business, ruthless to its competitors and employees alike. Instead of the easy-going paternalism of van Munster, Jan's new bosses are capitalist empire-builders - who expect their employees to work harder for less pay.

Back in the Netherlands, Jan and his disgruntled shipmates attempt to express their protest at this sudden blow. But they have little idea of how to go about starting a trade union, and they reject the advice which a Socialist agitator tries to give them. They think that it would be enough to gather on an evening, get more than a little drunk, and loudly vent off their protest. Jan Wandelaar is especially loud and vehement in his denunciation of the notorious Mr. Kwel. Jan's words are carefully noted down by a company spy and reported, and the new bosses decide to make an example of him. Jan is promptly fired and also ordered to pay back immediately the loan given by the generous van Munster - which means that the neat new home must be sold and the poor Nellie must return to her parents'.

After some time of being kept kicking their heels ashore, Kwel offers Jan and some other "black sheep" a "one last chance" at employment - they can take up a voyage to North America. With the crew composed almost entirely of those who had angered the Kwel Company, they expect to be placed on some old rust-bucket and are flabbergasted to get a brand new ship, "running like lightning and smoothly responding to the helm". Jan and the others immediately fall in love with their new ship. It seems too good to be true - and it certainly is. Halfway across the Atlantic Jan realizes with horror the truth - the new ship was unstable, a floating death trap which would never reach America. Once her store of coal is consumed, the ship's center of gravity becomes too high, and she would capsize with any strong gale - let alone a storm. Kwel would neatly get rid of the "trouble-makers" on board and pocket the insurance.

At the moment of crisis, with the Captain dead and the ship sinking, Jan Wandelaar assumes leadership of the remnants of the crew, and brings them safely to the Canadian shore. Then he finds a profitable though hazardous way to get back to Europe - taking an old, obsolete lightship to Denmark - the first command of "Captain Jan". But on returning to the Netherlands he gets the news that Nellie had died in childbirth, leaving him with two orphaned twin babies. On top of that, the conniving Kwel manages to take away much of the reward which Jan and his crew gained in their hazardous return crossing.

Full of fury, Jan sets off to the Kwel main office in Rotterdam, bursting in and beating up a person which he mistook for the notorious Mr. Kwel, fully intending to kill him with his bare hands. Fortunately, he did not kill the man, who was in fact only an innocuous accountant. Still, the police arrives and Jan finds himself in jail. At this nadir of his career, he gets a visit from Mr. Beumers van Haaften of the Dutch Harborworks Company. Until now, van Haaften's company was a customer of Kwel's, not having their own tugboats, and he is not yet ready to go into open competition with the tugboat giant. However, he is willing to discreetly help Jan Wandelaar start a small shipping business of his own.

Thus, Captain Jan embarks on his independent career, at the head of a faithful crew - a very little struggling David facing the implacable hostility of the Kwel Goliath. He has the luck to save an American millionaire's yacht in the Caribbean, getting a considerable sum in salvage. This enables him to buy a solid though old tugboat from Mr. Kiers of Terschelling Island, a minor competitor of Kwel's. This also gets Jan increasingly involved with Riekie Kiers, the daughter of the man who sold him the ship - a young woman who had grown up on the sea. In fact, she is as good a ship-handler as Jan himself, but in the early Twentieth Century Dutch society, there is no way for a woman to have a nautical career.

Jan's first assignment takes him to the Dutch East Indies. There, he gets into partnership with the rather shady Captain Rang, of German origin, who suggests to get the lucrative salvage for the Moira, a large cruising ship which was wrecked some years before on the south shore of the island of New Guinea. Since moving the wrecked ship would require a large expenditure of manpower, salvaging her was abandoned as unprofitable. It turns out that Rang had come up with the cynical idea of trapping hundreds of Papuans and using their coerced, unpaid labor. The shocked Jan washes his hands of this scheme. Rang does get the Moira afloat, but at the terrible price of the Papuan forced laborers drowning in a storm. Eventually, Rang gets punished by "A Higher Justice" - his ship is struck by plague and he dies with all his crew. With the outbreak of World War I, Jan is unable to reaturn to the now submarine-infested European waters and sits out the war in the Far East. For a time his fight with Kwel is pushed aside.

With the end of the war, Captain Jan returns to Europe. He marries Riekie and his tugboat business prospers - facing Kwel on more equal terms. A large contract with Royal Navy, placing Jan in charge of a tugboat convoy taking a dry dock to the Falklands would, if carried out successfully, solidly establish his position. Kwel embarks on an all-out war, pulling all stops and using every dirty trick - sending saboteurs on board and getting at Jan's suppliers to provide rotten and poisoned food. All of Kwel's ploys fail and the Falklands Convoy gets through triumphantly - but at the moment of victory Captain Jan is again dealt a cruel blow. A radio operator who was supposed to keep contact between the convoys' tugboats and warn of a coming storm, is turned physically and mentally ill by the storm. When Jan locks him in his room, the radio operator pulls a pistol and kills Riekie. A burial at sea is conducted and "at the bottom of the Atlantic rested forever the body of a woman to whose courage and foresight the men of the tugboats owed so much".

In the aftermath, Jan Wandelaar is in possession of information proving manifestly illegal activity by Kwel, whose publication might utterly destroy the company. But on reflection, Jan realizes that if he and Kwel spend all their energy fighting each other, foreign tugging companies will benefit and eventually replace the 'Glory of Holland'. Captain Jan opts to deal with the Kwel Company from a position of strength. Jan's company is merged with Kwel's, on condition that the united company accept all the demands of the Union of Tugboat Workers and that Mr. Kwel resign from his position as the company's Chief Director. All the captains and sailors who had been sacked or forced out during the struggle are reinstated, Jan himself becoming Commodore of Kwel's entire tugboat fleet.

In De Hartog' sequel, The Captain, it is seen that by the 1930s Kwel were back to their authoritarian dirty tricks, and a younger captain had to fight them all over again, under the grim conditions of the Second World War.

== See also ==
- Smit International
- Titan (steam tug 1894)
