= Melghirimyces profundicolus =

Scientific classification
- Domain: Bacteria
- Kingdom: Bacillati
- Phylum: Bacillota
- Class: Bacilli
- Order: Caryophanales
- Family: Thermoactinomycetaceae
- Genus: Melghirimyces
- Species: M. profundicolus

Binomial name
- Melghirimyces profundicolus Li et al. 2013

Type strain
- CCTCC AA 2012007, DSM 45787, NBRC 109068, SCSIO 11153

Species of bacterium

Melghirimyces profundicolus is a bacterium from the genus Melghirimyces which has been isolated from deep-sea sediments from the Indian Ocean.
