= Laceyella tengchongensis =

Scientific classification
- Domain: Bacteria
- Kingdom: Bacillati
- Phylum: Bacillota
- Class: Bacilli
- Order: Caryophanales
- Family: Thermoactinomycetaceae
- Genus: Laceyella
- Species: L. tengchongensis

Binomial name
- Laceyella tengchongensis Zhang et al. 2010

Type strain
- CCTCC AA 208050, DSM 45262, YIM 10002

Synonyms
- Laceyella yunnanensis

Species of bacterium

Laceyella tengchongensis is a thermophilic bacterium from the genus Laceyella which has been isolated from soil from the Big Empty Volcano in Tengchong in China.
