= Mechercharimyces mesophilus =

Scientific classification
- Domain: Bacteria
- Kingdom: Bacillati
- Phylum: Bacillota
- Class: Bacilli
- Order: Caryophanales
- Family: Thermoactinomycetaceae
- Genus: Mechercharimyces
- Species: M. mesophilus

Binomial name
- Mechercharimyces mesophilus Matsuo et al. 2006

Type strain
- DSM 44894, MBIC06230, YM3-251

Species of bacterium

Mechercharimyces mesophilus is a Gram-positive bacterium from the genus Mechercharimyces which has been isolated from sediments from the Jellyfish Lake in Palau.
