= Melghirimyces thermohalophilus =

Scientific classification
- Domain: Bacteria
- Kingdom: Bacillati
- Phylum: Bacillota
- Class: Bacilli
- Order: Caryophanales
- Family: Thermoactinomycetaceae
- Genus: Melghirimyces
- Species: M. thermohalophilus

Binomial name
- Melghirimyces thermohalophilus Addou et al. 2013

Type strain
- CCUG 60050, DSM 45514, Nari11A

Species of bacterium

Melghirimyces thermohalophilus is a Gram-positive, halophilic, thermotolerant and aerobic bacterium from the genus Melghirimyces which has been isolated from the salt lake Chott Melghir in Algeria.
