= Feldhauptmann =

Landsknecht military rank

The Feldhauptmann (pl. Feldhauptleute; lit. 'field captain') was a historical military appointment, during the time of the Landsknechte or mercenaries in European warfare, who commanded a Fähnlein, a unit of roughly battalion-size.

The commander of a regiment, who initially still commanded his own Fähnlein, was designated as the Obristfeldhauptmann ("senior field captain"), the most senior of the Feldhauptleute in the regiment. Orally this was abbreviated to Obrist, the equivalent of "colonel" (likewise the rank of general arose from Generalobrist.)

Georg von Frundsberg, but later Johann Tserclaes and Albrecht von Wallenstein as well, were often referred to by their contemporaries as Feldhauptleute.

In Rome in the Middle Ages there were Feldhauptleute, the so-called capitani. See also Generalkapitän.

== Sources ==
German dictionary by Jacob and Wilhelm Grimm General
