= Marininema mesophilum =

Scientific classification
- Domain: Bacteria
- Kingdom: Bacillati
- Phylum: Bacillota
- Class: Bacilli
- Order: Caryophanales
- Family: Thermoactinomycetaceae
- Genus: Marininema
- Species: M. mesophilum

Binomial name
- Marininema mesophilum Li et al. 2012

Type strain
- CCTCC AA 2011006, DSM 45610, SCSIO 10219

Synonyms
- Marina mesophila

Species of bacterium

Marininema mesophilum is a bacterium from the genus Marininema which has been isolated from sediments from South China Sea.
