= Mechercharimyces asporophorigenens =

Scientific classification
- Domain: Bacteria
- Kingdom: Bacillati
- Phylum: Bacillota
- Class: Bacilli
- Order: Caryophanales
- Family: Thermoactinomycetaceae
- Genus: Mechercharimyces
- Species: M. asporophorigenens

Binomial name
- Mechercharimyces asporophorigenens Matsuo et al. 2006

Type strain
- DSM 44955, MBIC06487, YM11-542

Synonyms
- Mechercharomyces nonsporophorensis

Species of bacterium

Mechercharimyces asporophorigenens is a bacterium from the genus Mechercharimyces which has been isolated from sediments from Palau. Mechercharimyces asporophorigenens produces the cytotoxic substance urukthapelstatin A.
