= Thermoflavimicrobium dichotomicum =

Scientific classification
- Domain: Bacteria
- Kingdom: Bacillati
- Phylum: Bacillota
- Class: Bacilli
- Order: Caryophanales
- Family: Thermoactinomycetaceae
- Genus: Thermoflavimicrobium
- Species: T. dichotomicum

Binomial name
- Thermoflavimicrobium dichotomicum (Krasil'nikov and Agre 1964) Yoon et al. 2005

Type strain
- 114, Abbott AB2383P-72, ATCC 49854, CUB 581, DSM 44778, INMI 114, JCM 9688, KCTC 3667, N1595, NCIMB 10211, NRRL B-16978, VKM Ac-1435

Synonyms
- Actinobifida dichotomica; Thermomonospora citrina; Thermoactinomyces dichotomicus

Species of bacterium

Thermoflavimicrobium dichotomicum is a Gram-positive and thermophilic bacterium from the genus of Thermoflavimicrobium which has been isolated from soil.
