= Shimazuella kribbensis =

Scientific classification
- Domain: Bacteria
- Kingdom: Bacillati
- Phylum: Bacillota
- Class: Bacilli
- Order: Caryophanales
- Family: Thermoactinomycetaceae
- Genus: Shimazuella
- Species: S. kribbensis

Binomial name
- Shimazuella kribbensis Park et al. 2007

Type strain
- A 9500, DSM 45090, JCM 14729, KCCM 41585, KCTC 9933

Synonyms
- Koreamonospora kribbensis; Thermoactinomyces kribbensis; Seinonella kribbensis

Species of bacterium

Shimazuella kribbensis is a mesophilic bacterium from the genus of Shimazuella which has been isolated from forest soil from the Sobaek Mountains in Korea.
