= Desmospora activa =

Scientific classification
- Domain: Bacteria
- Kingdom: Bacillati
- Phylum: Bacillota
- Class: Bacilli
- Order: Caryophanales
- Family: Thermoactinomycetaceae
- Genus: Desmospora
- Species: D. activa

Binomial name
- Desmospora activa Yassin et al. 2009

Type strain
- CCUG 55916, DSM 45169, IMMIB L-1269

Synonyms
- Catenispora activa

Species of bacterium

Desmospora activa is a Gram-positive and aerobic bacterium from the genus Desmospora which has been isolated from the sputum from a patient with suspected pulmonary tuberculosis in Germany.
