= Planifilum fimeticola =

Scientific classification
- Domain: Bacteria
- Kingdom: Bacillati
- Phylum: Bacillota
- Class: Bacilli
- Order: Caryophanales
- Family: Thermoactinomycetaceae
- Genus: Planifilum
- Species: P. fimeticola

Binomial name
- Planifilum fimeticola Hatayama et al. 2005

Type strain
- ATCC BAA-969, BCRC 16827, CCRC 16827, DSM 44946, H0165, JCM 12507

Species of bacterium

Planifilum fimeticola is a gram-positive and thermophilic bacterium which has been isolated from hyperthermal compost in Japan.
