= Lihuaxuella thermophila =

Scientific classification
- Domain: Bacteria
- Kingdom: Bacillati
- Phylum: Bacillota
- Class: Bacilli
- Order: Caryophanales
- Family: Thermoactinomycetaceae
- Genus: Lihuaxuella
- Species: L. thermophila

Binomial name
- Lihuaxuella thermophila Yu et al. 2013

Synonyms
- Lihuaxuella thermophilus

Species of bacterium

Lihuaxuella thermophila is a bacterium from the genus of Lihuaxuella which has been isolated from geothermal soil from the Rehai National Park in Tengchong in China.
