= Laceyella sacchari =

Scientific classification
- Domain: Bacteria
- Kingdom: Bacillati
- Phylum: Bacillota
- Class: Bacilli
- Order: Caryophanales
- Family: Thermoactinomycetaceae
- Genus: Laceyella
- Species: L. sacchari

Binomial name
- Laceyella sacchari (Lacey 1971) Yoon et al. 2005

Type strain
- A978, ATCC 27375, BCRC 13341, CBS 7001.70, CBS 701.70, CCM 3274, CCRC 13341, CCUG 7967, CDBB 156, CECT 5332, CUB 618, DSM 43356, IFO 13920, IMET 9713, JCM 3137, JCM 3214, KACC 20089, KCC A-0137, KCC A-0214, KCC S-0137, KCCA-0137, KCCA-0214, KCTC 9790, LMG 21518, LMG 21673, MTCC 955, NBRC 13920, NCIB 10486, NCIMB 10486, NCTC 10721, NRRL B-16981, PCM 2375, UUB 618, VKM Ac-1360, VTT E-011981

Synonyms
- Thermoactinomyces thalpophilus Thermoactinomyces sacchari

Species of bacterium

Laceyella sacchari is a bacterium from the genus Laceyella which has been isolated from a bagasse in Thailand.
