= Planifilum composti =

Scientific classification
- Domain: Bacteria
- Kingdom: Bacillati
- Phylum: Bacillota
- Class: Bacilli
- Order: Caryophanales
- Family: Thermoactinomycetaceae
- Genus: Planifilum
- Species: P. composti

Binomial name
- Planifilum composti Han et al. 2013

Type strain
- KACC 16581, NBRC 108858, P12, P8

Species of bacterium

Planifilum composti is a thermophilic and aerobic bacterium from the genus of Planifilum which has been isolated from compost in Korea.
