= Thermoactinomyces =

Scientific classification
- Domain: Bacteria
- Kingdom: Bacillati
- Phylum: Bacillota
- Class: Bacilli
- Order: Caryophanales
- Family: Thermoactinomycetaceae
- Genus: Thermoactinomyces; Tsiklinsky 1899

Species
- Thermoactinomyces daqus; Thermoactinomyces intermedius; Thermoactinomyces khenchelensis; Thermoactinomyces mirandus; Thermoactinomyces vulgaris

Genus of bacteria

Thermoactinomyces is a genus of bacteria ine the order of Caryophanales.
