= Laceyella =

Scientific classification
- Domain: Bacteria
- Kingdom: Bacillati
- Phylum: Bacillota
- Class: Bacilli
- Order: Caryophanales
- Family: Thermoactinomycetaceae
- Genus: Laceyella; Yoon et al. 2005

Type species
- Laceyella sacchari (Lacey 1971) Yoon et al. 2005

Species
- L. putida; L. sacchari; L. sediminis; L. tengchongensis; L. thermophila

Genus of bacteria

Laceyella is a Gram-positive, thermophilic, spore-forming and aerobic bacterial genus from the family Thermoactinomycetaceae. The genus Laceyella is namened after the English microbiologist John Lacey.

== Phylogeny ==
The currently accepted taxonomy is based on the List of Prokaryotic names with Standing in Nomenclature (LPSN) and National Center for Biotechnology Information (NCBI).

16S rRNA based LTP_10_2024

- Laceyella
  - L. thermophila Ming et al. 2017
  - - L. putida (Lacey & Cross 1989) Yoon et al. 2005
    - - L. sacchari (Lacey 1971) Yoon et al. 2005
      - - L. sediminis Chen et al. 2012
        - L. tengchongensis Zhang et al. 2010

120 marker proteins based GTDB 09-RS220

- Laceyella
  - L. sacchari
  - L. sediminis [incl. L. tengchongensis]
