= Thermoflavimicrobium =

Scientific classification
- Domain: Bacteria
- Kingdom: Bacillati
- Phylum: Bacillota
- Class: Bacilli
- Order: Caryophanales
- Family: Thermoactinomycetaceae
- Genus: Thermoflavimicrobium; Yoon et al. 2005

Type species
- Thermoflavimicrobium dichotomicum (Krassilnikov & Agre 1964) Yoon et al. 2005

Species
- Thermoflavimicrobium daqi; Thermoflavimicrobium dichotomicum

Synonyms
- "Actinobifida" Krasilnikov & Agre 1964

Genus of bacteria

Thermoflavimicrobium is a Gram-positive, thermophilic, aerobic and chemoorganotroph bacterial genus from the family Thermoactinomycetaceae.

== Phylogeny ==
The currently accepted taxonomy is based on the List of Prokaryotic names with Standing in Nomenclature (LPSN) and National Center for Biotechnology Information (NCBI).

16S rRNA based LTP_10_2024

- Thermoflavimicrobium
  - T. daqi Li, Huang & Qiu 2019
  - T. dichotomicum (Krassilnikov & Agre 1964) Yoon et al. 2005

120 marker proteins based GTDB 09-RS220

- Thermoflavimicrobium
  - T. daqi
  - T. dichotomicum
