= Seinonella =

Scientific classification
- Domain: Bacteria
- Kingdom: Bacillati
- Phylum: Bacillota
- Class: Bacilli
- Order: Caryophanales
- Family: Thermoactinomycetaceae
- Genus: Seinonella; Yoon et al. 2005

Type species
- Seinonella peptonophila (Nonomura & Ohara 1971) Yoon et al. 2005

Species
- S. peptonophila

Genus of bacteria

Seinonella is a Gram-positive and aerobic bacterial genus from the family Thermoactinomycetaceae. Up to now there is only one species of this genus known (Seinonella peptonophila).
