= Kaptan =

Kaptan may refer to:

- Kapudan Pasha (modern Turkish: Kaptan Paşa), were the titles given to the chief commander of the navy in the Ottoman Empire
- Cihan Kaptan, Turkish-German footballer
- Kaptan, a sky deity of the Visayan peoples in central Philippines; see Philippine mythology
- Kaptaan (lit. 'Captain'), 2016 Indian film
- Kaptan (software), the setup wizard from Pardus (operating system)

== See also ==
- Captain (disambiguation)
- Kapton, a lightweight chemical insulator film
