= Mechercharimyces =

Scientific classification
- Domain: Bacteria
- Kingdom: Bacillati
- Phylum: Bacillota
- Class: Bacilli
- Order: Caryophanales
- Family: Thermoactinomycetaceae
- Genus: Mechercharimyces; Matsuo et al. 2006

Type species
- Mechercharimyces mesophilus Matsuo et al. 2006

Species
- Mechercharimyces asporophorigenens; Mechercharimyces mesophilus

Genus of bacteria

Mechercharimyces is a Gram-positive and chemoorganotroph bacterial genus from the family Thermoactinomycetaceae.

== Phylogeny ==
The currently accepted taxonomy is based on the List of Prokaryotic names with Standing in Nomenclature (LPSN) and National Center for Biotechnology Information (NCBI).

16S rRNA based LTP_10_2024

- Mechercharimyces
  - M. asporophorigenens Matsuo et al. 2006
  - M. mesophilus Matsuo et al. 2006

120 marker proteins based GTDB 09-RS220

- Mechercharimyces
  - M. asporophorigenens
  - M. mesophilus
