= Capitano =

Capitano may refer to:

- Capitano del Popolo, office in a medieval Italian city-state
- Il Capitano, stock character in a commedia dell'arte

== See also ==
- Captain
- Capitan
