= Carboxypeptidase T =

Identifiers
- EC no.: 3.4.17.18
- CAS no.: 89623-65-4

Databases
- IntEnz: IntEnz view
- BRENDA: BRENDA entry
- ExPASy: NiceZyme view
- KEGG: KEGG entry
- MetaCyc: metabolic pathway
- PRIAM: profile
- PDB structures: RCSB PDB PDBe PDBsum
Search
- PMC: articles
- PubMed: articles
- NCBI: proteins

Carboxypeptidase T (EC 3.4.17.18, CPT) is a hydrolytic enzyme. This enzyme catalyses the following chemical reaction:

Releases a C-terminal residue, which may be hydrophobic or positively charged.

This enzyme is isolated from Thermoactinomyces vulgaris.
