= Jan de Hartog =

Dutch playwright and novelist (1914–2002)

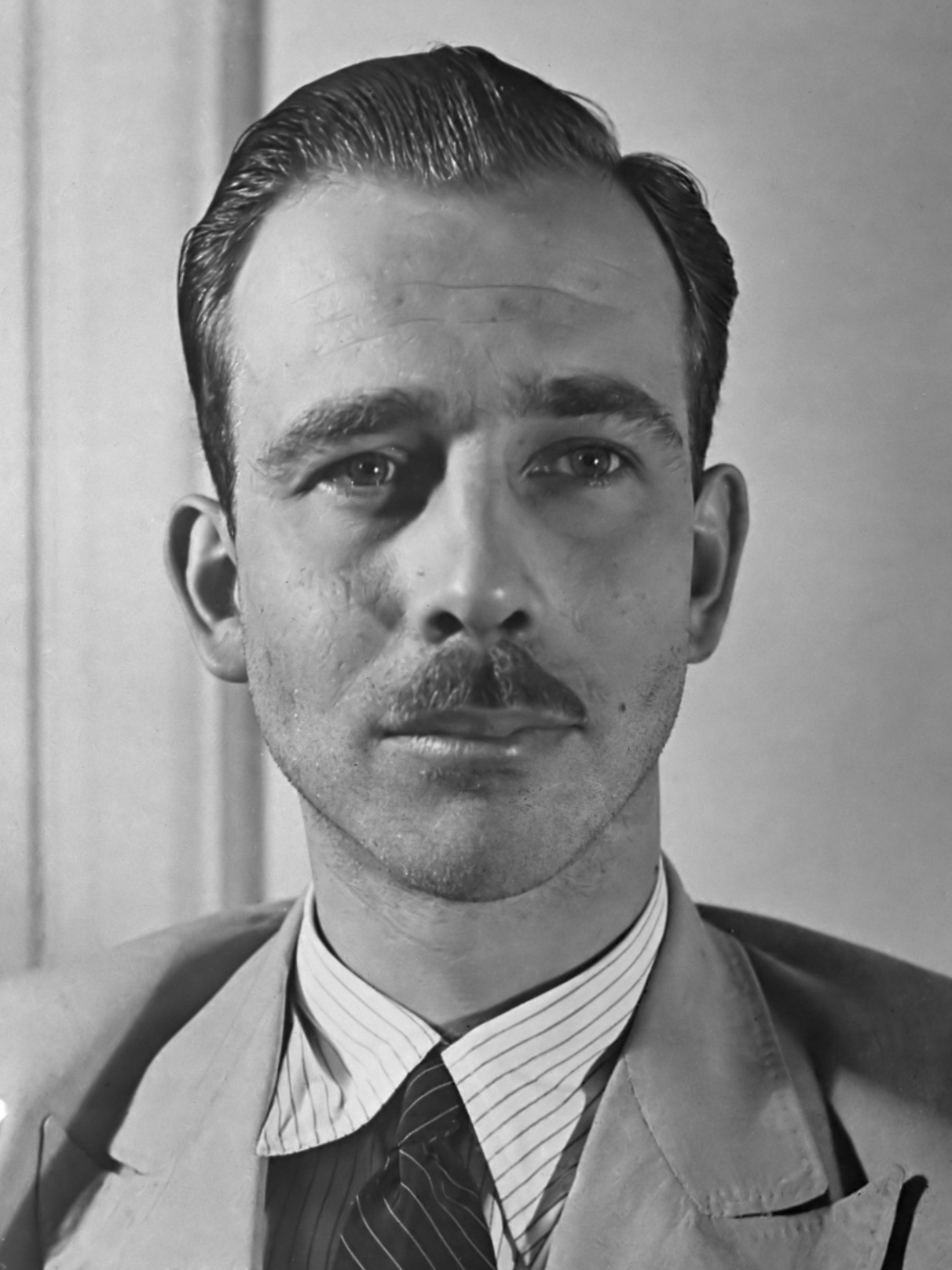
- De Hartog in 1943
- Born: April 22, 1914; Haarlem, Netherlands
- Died: September 22, 2002 (aged 88); Houston, Texas
- Occupations: Novelist and playwright
- Spouse: Marjorie de Hartog
- Writing career
- Pen name: "F. R. Eckmar" (used infrequently)
- Genres: Non-fiction, Creative non-fiction, and fiction
- Subject: (primarily) Seafaring stories
- Notable works: Holland's Glorie; The Captain; The Peaceable Kingdom: An American Saga; The Hospital
- Notable awards: Tony Award 1952 For "The Fourposter" (best play); Nominated for Nobel Prize 1972 For "The Peaceable Kingdom"; Cross of Merit 1945 For wartime Merchant Marine activities

Jan de Hartog (April 22, 1914 – September 22, 2002) was a Dutch playwright, novelist and occasional social critic who moved to the United States in the early 1960s and became a Quaker.

== Early life ==
In 1914, Jan de Hartog was born to a Dutch Calvinist minister and professor of theology, Arnold Hendrik, and his wife, Lucretia de Hartog, who was a lecturer in medieval mysticism. He was raised in Haarlem in the Netherlands.

When he was 10 year old, de Hartog ran away to become a cabin boy on board a Dutch fishing boat. Despite his father having returned de Hartog home, when he was 12 years old, de Hartog ran away to a steamer in the Baltic.

At 16, he attended the Kweekschool voor de Zeevaart in Amsterdam, a training college for the Dutch merchant marine.

De Hartog shoveled coal at night with the Amsterdam Harbour Police until 1932.

While employed as skipper of a tour boat on the Amsterdam Canals, he wrote mysteries featuring Inspector Gregor Boyarski of the Amsterdam Harbor Police. He used the pseudonym "F. R. Eckmar."

His theater career began in the 1930s at the Amsterdam Municipal Theater, where he acted in and wrote a play.

== World War II ==
In May 1940, 10 days before Nazi Germany invaded and occupied the Netherlands, de Hartog published his book Hollands Glorie (Holland's Glory, translated into English as Captain Jan).

The novel described the life of sailors on ocean-going tugboats rescuing ocean liners. The book became a bestseller in the Netherlands. De Hartog joined the Dutch resistance, and was pursued by the Nazis, forcing him to go into hiding in Amsterdam in 1943. He escaped to England. His book became the best selling novel of the war years in the Netherlands.

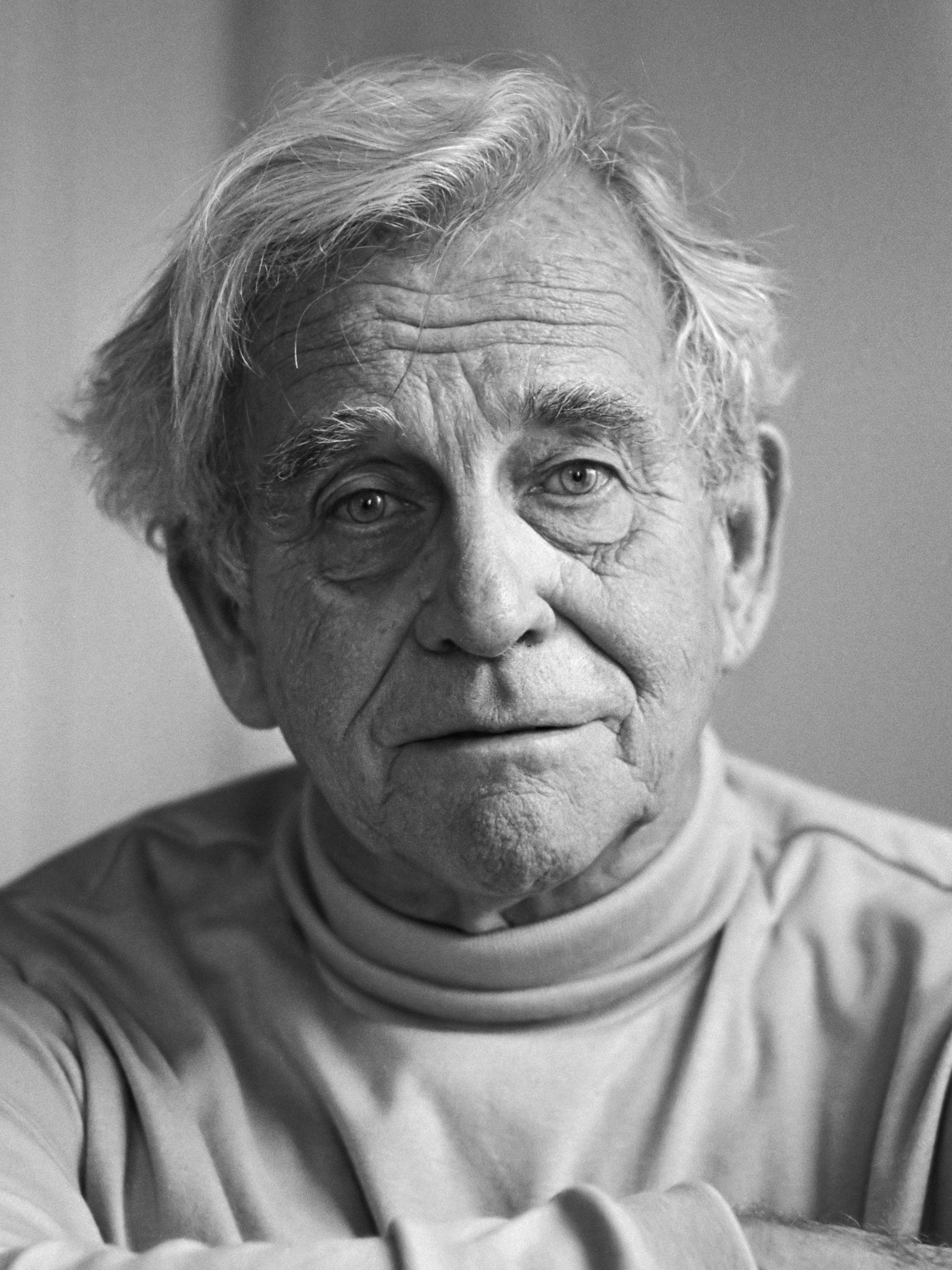
De Hartog in 1984

He joined the Netherlands merchant navy as a correspondent in 1943 and served as a ship's captain for which he received the Netherlands' "Cross of Merit."

De Hartog's experience served as the background for books such as The Captain and Stella. Stella was made into a movie called The Key, starring Sophia Loren, Trevor Howard, and William Holden.

== Postwar ==
In 1947, De Hartog's book Hollands Glorie was translated into English and was called Captain Jan. Remaining in the United Kingdom, de Hartog began writing his books in English, beginning with The Lost Sea (1951), which was a fictional account of his experiences working aboard ship.

In 1952, while visiting New York, he encountered a play that he had written while he had still been in hiding during the war and had sold the rights to while he was in England. The play was called The Fourposter, for which de Hartog received a Tony Award for Best Play at the 6th annual Tony Awards Show. Columbia Pictures made The Fourposter into a partially animated movie, starring Rex Harrison and Lilli Palmer. The film was nominated for a Golden Globe and an Academy Award for its cinematography. In 1966, The Fourposter became the musical I Do! I Do! The play appeared under its original name at the Theatre New Brunswick in 1974.

De Hartog and his wife transformed a 90-foot Dutch ship into a houseboat, which they made their home. During the floods in the Netherlands of 1953, The Rival was transformed into a floating hospital about which de Hartog wrote in The Little Ark.

== Move to America ==
In the 1950s, de Hartog took The Rival to Houston, Texas on the deck of a freighter.

While de Hartog was lecturing at the University of Houston on playwriting, he and his wife volunteered at Jefferson Davis Hospital.

De Hartog wrote about the bad conditions at the hospital in his non-fiction memoir The Hospital (1964). The book received a national response but also a local response in which, within a week of the book's release, nearly four hundred citizens volunteered at the hospital. It led to reforms of the city's indigent healthcare system through the creation of the Harris County Hospital District. Despite national success, some of Houston's citizens reacted to the book with hostility, forcing de Hartog and his wife to return to Europe.

In 1967, de Hartog wrote The Captain, which revisited his love of the sea and featured a central character based loosely on himself called Martinus Harinxma, who had first appeared in The Lost Sea (1951). The book was a success, and Martinus would live on as a central character in several sequels.

Before starting work on the second in the Martinus series, de Hartog wrote of the experience of adopting his two daughters, who were Korean War orphans, in The Children, which appeared in 1969. He wrote a fictionalized account of the origin of the Religious Society of Friends, The Peaceable Kingdom: An American Saga, in 1972. It was nominated for the Nobel Prize and was followed eight years later by a Quaker novel, The Lamb's War (1980).

In 1985, de Hartog was awarded an honorary Doctor of Humane Letters (L.H.D.) degree from Whittier College.

He published the next book in the Martinus series, The Commodore, in 1986 while he was living in The Walled Garden in East Coker, Somerset, England, and it was followed by The Centurion (1989), which explored an interest in which he and his wife had become involved, dowsing.

In 1993, de Hartog and his wife returned to Houston. He returned to the Quaker theme to write the last in the series, The Peculiar People, in 1992.

De Hartog's last fully completed novel was The Outer Buoy: A Story of the Ultimate Voyage in 1994.

In 1996, de Hartog was honored as the annual "Special Guest" at the Netherlands Film Festival.

In 2002, de Hartog died at the age of 88. His ashes were taken to sea on a tugboat, the SMITWIJS SINGAPORE, and were scattered on the surface of the sea at position 52.02.5 N – 04.05.0 E at 13.10 hrs LT by his wife, Marjorie, and his son, Nick, while other family members spread flowers at the site.

In 2007, Marjorie de Hartog edited a short story that her husband had begun, A View of the Ocean.

== Media ==
=== Books ===
==== Fiction ====
- Hollands Glorie, roman van de zeesleepvaart [Holland's Glory, novel of sea towage] (in Dutch). Amsterdam: Elsevier. 1940. ISBN 978-9089180100. LCCN 44020919. OCLC 21744141. OL 6471401M. The Lost Sea (1st ed.). New York: Harper & Brothers. 1951. ISBN 978-0848809829. LCCN 51012214. OCLC 1578246. OL 6094530M.
- The Distant Shore: A Story of The Sea (1st ed.). New York: Harper & Brothers. 1951. ISBN 978-0689103735. LCCN 52005443. OCLC 1152924887. OL 6109582M. (also published as Stella and The Key)
- The Little Ark. Illustrated by Joseph Low (1st ed.). New York: Harper & Brothers. 1954. ISBN 978-0689103735. LCCN 53011959. OCLC 436092774. OL 14449919M.
- Peacock, Carlos, ed. (1954). Captain Jan: A Story of Ocean Tugboats (1st ed.). Cleaver-Hume Press. ASIN B0000CIC9A. OCLC 31766673. OL 17389365M – via Internet Archive.
- The Spiral Road (1st ed.). Harper & Brothers. 1957. ISBN 978-0892440924. OCLC 355524. OL 6202446M – via Internet Archive.
- The Inspector (1960) ISBN 0-88411-069-9
- The Artist (1963)
- The Captain. New York: Atheneum. 1 January 1966. ISBN 978-0933852839. LCCN 66016358. OCLC 18383264. OL 5986408M – via Internet Archive.
- The Peaceable Kingdom: An American Saga (1971) ISBN 0-449-21773-6
- The Lamb's War (1st ed.). New York: Harper & Row. 1979. ISBN 978-0060109950. LCCN 78020201. OCLC 1145733594. OL 4731678M.
- The Trail of the Serpent ISBN 0-06-039018-2
- Star of Peace (1983) ISBN 0-06-039029-8
- Het Helig Experiment (1983)
- The Commodore: A Novel of the Sea (1st ed.). New York: Harper & Row. 1 May 1986. ISBN 978-0060390419. LCCN 84048591. OCLC 12023922. OL 2869502M.
- The Centurion: A Novel (1989) ISBN 0-06-039094-8
- The Peculiar People (1992) ISBN 0-679-41636-6
- The Outer Buoy: A Story of the Ultimate Voyage (1st ed.). New York: Pantheon Books. 1 November 1994. ISBN 978-0679436041. LCCN 94009780. OCLC 1036812867. OL 1085881M.
- The Flight of the Henny
- The Call of the Sea

===== Stories =====
- Mission to Borneo in Volume 30 - Summer 1957
- Duel with a Witch Doctor in Volume 31 - Autumn 1957
- "The Artist". Reader's Digest Condensed Books - Summer Selections. Vol. 3 (1st ed.). Pleasantville, New York: Reader's Digest Association. 1 January 1963. pp. 11–77. ASIN B003U0X78Y. OCLC 4553306. OL 24401987M – via Internet Archive.
- "The Captain". Reader's Digest Condensed Books - Winter Selections. Vol. 1 (1st ed.). Pleasantville, New York: Reader's Digest Association. 1967. pp. 135–287. ASIN B000GSMB3U. OCLC 8902706. OL 24217930M – via Internet Archive.

==== Non-fiction ====
- A Sailor's Life (1st ed.). New York: Harper. 1 June 1956. ISBN 978-9997500595. LCCN 55008991. OCLC 948813805. OL 6177232M.
- Waters of the New World: Houston to Nantucket. Drawings by Jo Spier. (1st ed.). New York: Atheneum. 1961. ASIN B000HKM02O. LCCN 61013559. OCLC 1646142. OL 14726953M.
- The Hospital (1st ed.). New York: Atheneum. 1 January 1964. ISBN 978-0971832206. LCCN 64023633. OCLC 391640. OL 5919861M.
- The Sailing Ship. The Odyssey library. Vol. 2. Drawings by Jo Spier. (1st ed.). Odyssey Press. 1961. ASIN B0007DUGOK. LCCN 64012885. OCLC 1012409. OL 5911248M.
- The Children: A Personal Record For the Use of Adoptive Parents (1st ed.). New York: Hamilton. 1969. ISBN 978-0241016220. LCCN 73426700. OCLC 28911. OL 5513517M.
- A View of the Ocean (1st ed.). New York: Pantheon Books. 27 November 2007. ISBN 978-0375424700. LCCN 2006102683. OCLC 255792171. OL 2869502M. (released posthumously)

=== Adaptations ===
==== Movies ====
The Four Poster (1952) – 1hr 43min – Directed by Irving G. Reis

- Based on the play The Fourposter.
- Won Venice International Film Festival — Volpi Cup for Best Actress (Lilli Palmer)
- Nominated for a Golden Globe for Best Cinematography — Black and white (Hal Mohr)
- Nominated – Best Cinematography (Black-and-White) at the 26th Academy Awards (Hal Mohr)

The Key (1958) – 2hrs 1 min – Directed by Carol Reed

- Based on the novel Stella
- with William Holden and Sophia Loren
- Won a British Academy Award for Best British Actor (Trevor Howard)

The Spiral Road (1962) – 2hrs 25min – Directed by Robert Mulligan

- Based on the novel of the same name.
- starring Rock Hudson and Burl Ives

Lisa (1962) – 1hr 52min – Directed by Philip Dunne

- Based on the novel, The Inspector
- Released as The Inspector in the United Kingdom
- starring Dolores Hart, Stephen Boyd and Donald Pleasence
- Nominated for a Golden Globe for "Best Picture – Drama"

The Little Ark (1972) – 1hr 40min – Directed by James B. Clark

- Based on the novel of the same name.
- Nominated – Best Original Song ("Come Follow, Follow Me") at the 45th Academy Awards (Marsha Karlin and Fred Karlin)

==== Television ====
- The Fourposter (Play on TV) (1955) – 1hr 30min – Directed by Clark Jones and aired on NBC, July 25, 1955, as an episode of the 'Producers' Showcase Series' whose tagline reads "Bringing the best of Broadway to the 21-inch screen".
- The Four Poster, 1964 Australian TV play directed by James Upshaw
