= Oberst =

Military rank

Oberst (German pronunciation: [ˈoːbɐst]) is a senior field officer rank in several German-speaking and Scandinavian countries, equivalent to Colonel. It is currently used by both the ground and air forces of Austria, Germany, Switzerland, Denmark, and Norway. The Swedish rank överste is a direct translation, as are the Finnish rank eversti and the Icelandic rank ofursti.

== History and origins ==
Oberst is a German word. Spelled with a capital O, "Oberst" is a noun and defines the military rank of colonel or group captain. Spelled with a lower case o, or "oberst", it is an adjective, meaning "superior, top, topmost, uppermost, highest, chief, head, first, principal, or supreme". Both usages derive from the superlative of ober(e), "the upper" or "the uppermost".

As a family name, Oberst is common in the southwest of Germany, in the area known as the Black Forest (Schwarzwald). The name is also concentrated in the north-central cantons of Switzerland (Aargau & Zürich). Here the Swiss version of Oberst is spelled Obrist. The name first appeared in the thirteenth century in the German-Swiss border area, and early forms were Zoberist and Oberist. The name most likely refers to the "tribe that lives the highest on the mountain" or "the family that lives the highest in the village".

Translated as "superior" or "supreme", the rank of Oberst can trace its origins to the Middle Ages where the term most likely described the senior knight on a battlefield or the senior captain in a regiment. With the emergence of professional armies in the sixteenth and seventeenth centuries, an Oberst became the commander of regiment or battalion-sized formations.

By the eighteenth century, Obersten were typically afforded aides or lieutenants, often titled Oberstleutnant. This led to formation of the modern German rank of the same name, translated as lieutenant colonel.

== Austria ==
Oberst
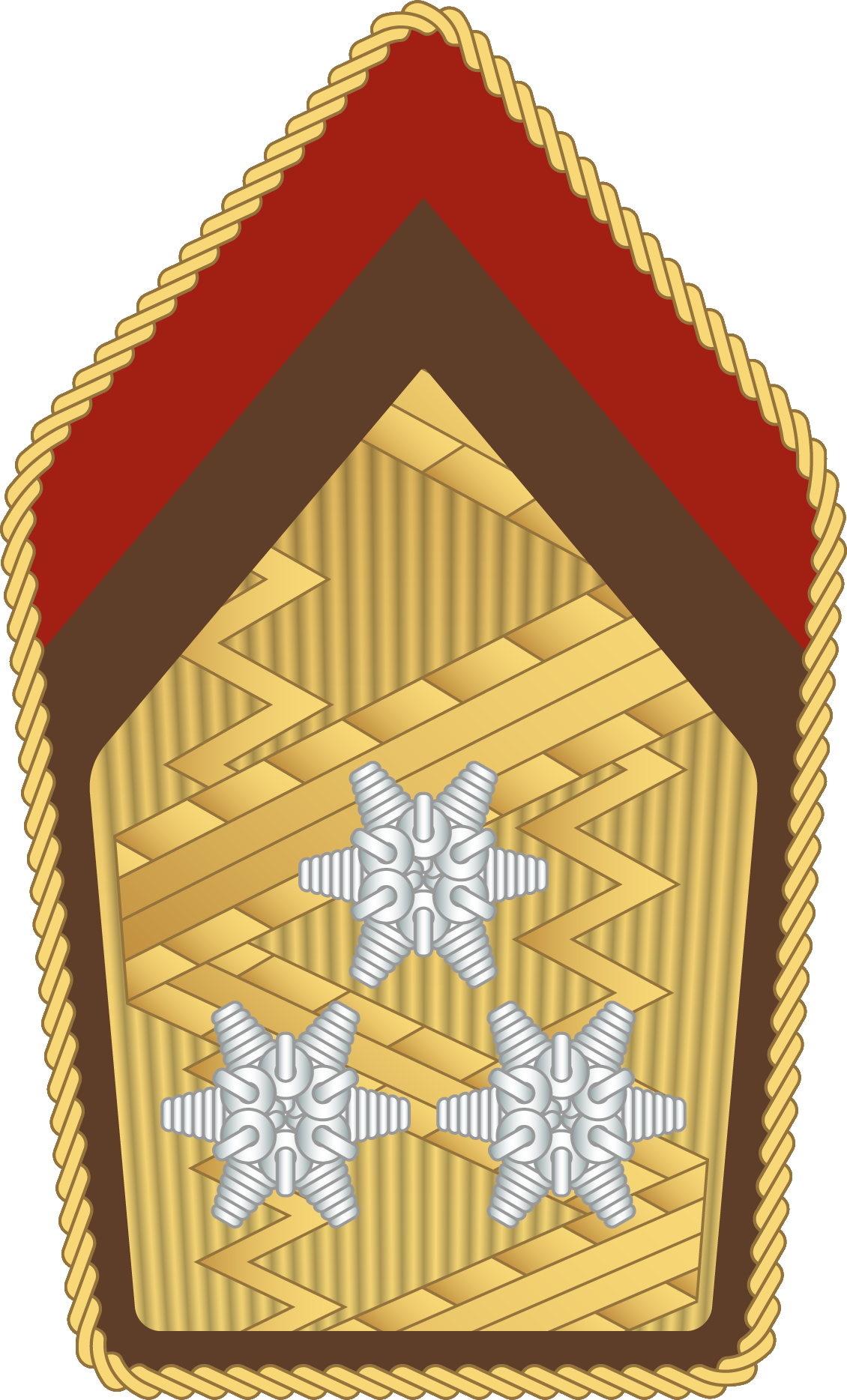
- Service uniform insignia
- Country: Austria
- Service branch: Austrian Armed Forces
- Non-NATO rank: OF-5
- Formation: 1918
- Next higher rank: Brigadier
- Next lower rank: Oberstleutnant

Oberst is the fifth highest rank in the Austrian Armed Forces.

== Denmark ==
Oberst
- Army and air force insignia
- Country: Denmark
- Service branch: Royal Danish Army; Royal Danish Air Force
- Rank group: Senior officer (Chefniveau)
- NATO rank code: OF-5
- Pay grade: M402
- Formation: 1563
- Next higher rank: Brigadegeneral
- Next lower rank: Oberstløjtnant
- Equivalent ranks: Kommandør

The Danish rank of oberst is based around the German term. Ranked OF-5 within NATO and having the paygrade of M402, it is used in the Royal Danish Army and the Royal Danish Air Force. The equivalent rank in the Royal Danish Navy is kommandør.

=== History ===
The rank can be traced back to at least 1563, when Count Günther of Schwarzburg-Arnstadt was named feltøverste (transl. Field colonel; lit. 'Superior [in the] field') of the Danish troops during the First Northern War. By 1586, Steen Maltesen Sehested was named Rigets oberst (transl. Colonel of the kingdom).

On 25 May 1671, the ranks were codified, by King Christian V, with the publication of the Danish order of precedence. Here there were two types of obersts. The colonel of the Life Guards placed below major general, and above colonels of the infantry and cavalry, which in turn was placed above the rank lieutenant colonel of the Life Guards.

As part of the Army Reform of 1867, the ranks of Major, Lieutenant colonel were removed, making oberst the only senior officer. By 1889, oberstløjtnant was reintroduced.

== Germany ==
Oberst
- Country: Germany
- Service branch: German Army; German Air Force
- Abbreviation: O
- Rank group: Commissioned officer
- NATO rank code: OF-5
- Pay grade: A16 or B3
- Formation: 1956 (current)
- Next higher rank: Brigadegeneral
- Next lower rank: Oberstleutnant
- Equivalent ranks: Kapitän zur See

Oberst (short: O) is the highest staff officer rank in the German Army (Heer) and the German Air Force (Luftwaffe).

=== Oberst in the Bundeswehr ===
The rank is rated OF-5 in NATO, and is grade A16 or B3 in the pay rules of the Federal Ministry of Defence. It is equivalent to:

- Oberstarzt, Oberstapotheker, and Oberstveterinär in the Joint Medical Service of the German Bundeswehr;
- Kapitän zur See and Flottenarzt in the German Navy.

On the shoulder straps (Heer, Luftwaffe) there are three silver pips (stars) in silver oak leaves.

Heer	Luftwaffe
Oberst i.G. (Gen. staff service) Oberst (Logistics troops) Oberst a.D. (Mech. infantry ret.)	Oberst (field suit) Oberst (Flecktarn)

=== Oberst in East Germany ===
Oberst was in the so-called armed organs of the GDR (German: Bewaffnete Organe der DDR), represented by Ministry of National Defence, and Ministry for State Security, the highest field officer rank, comparable to the colonel in many NATO-Armed forces (Rangcode OF-5). This was in reference to Soviet military doctrine and in line with other armed forces of the Warsaw Pact.

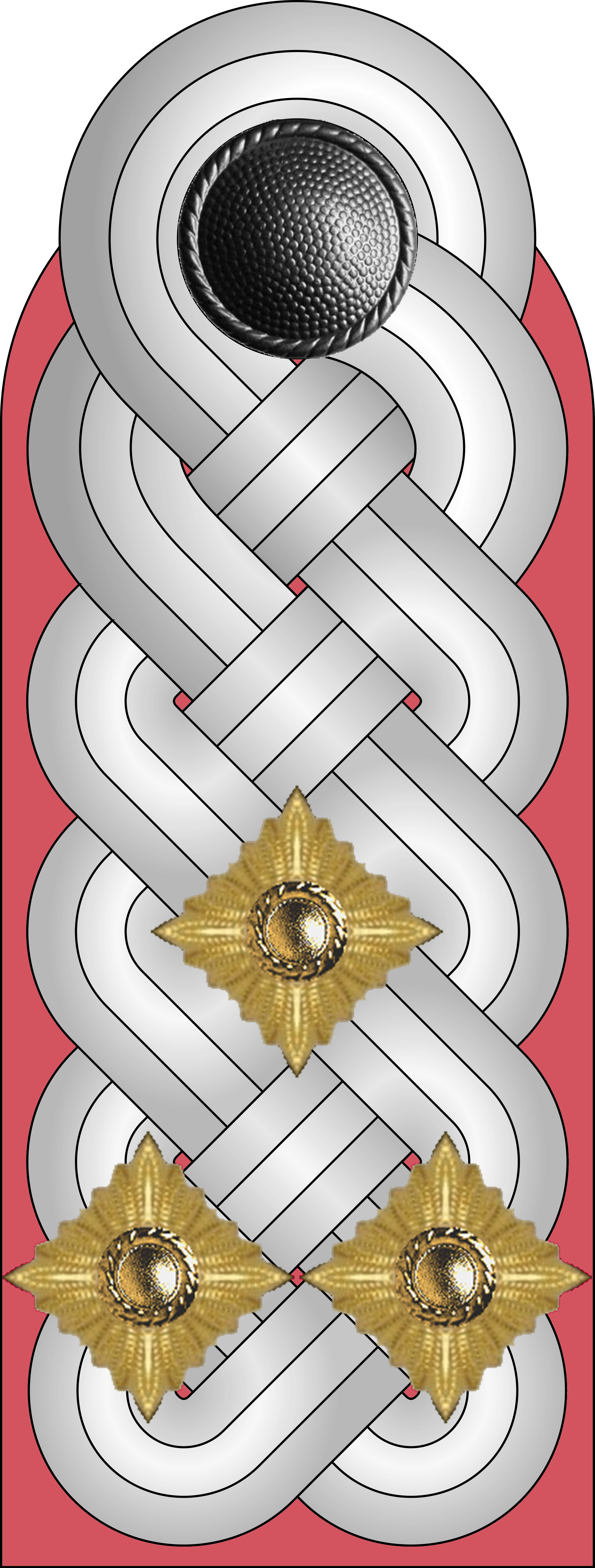
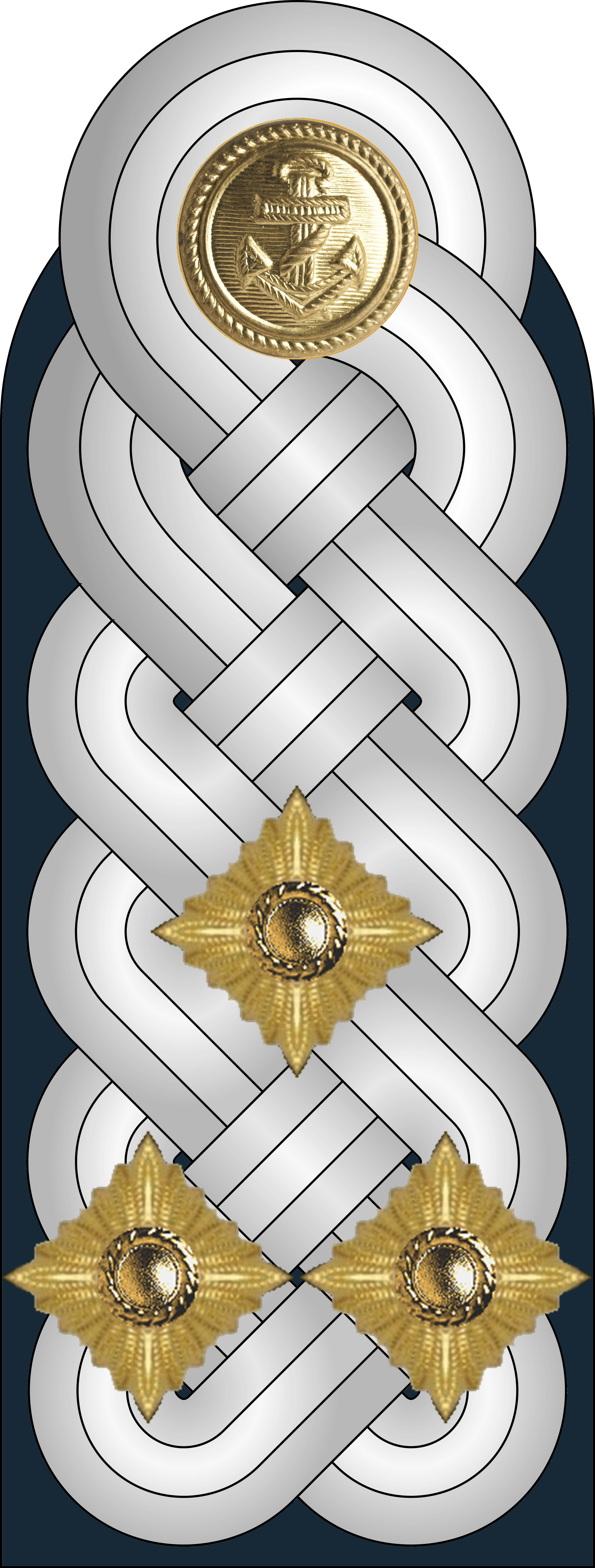
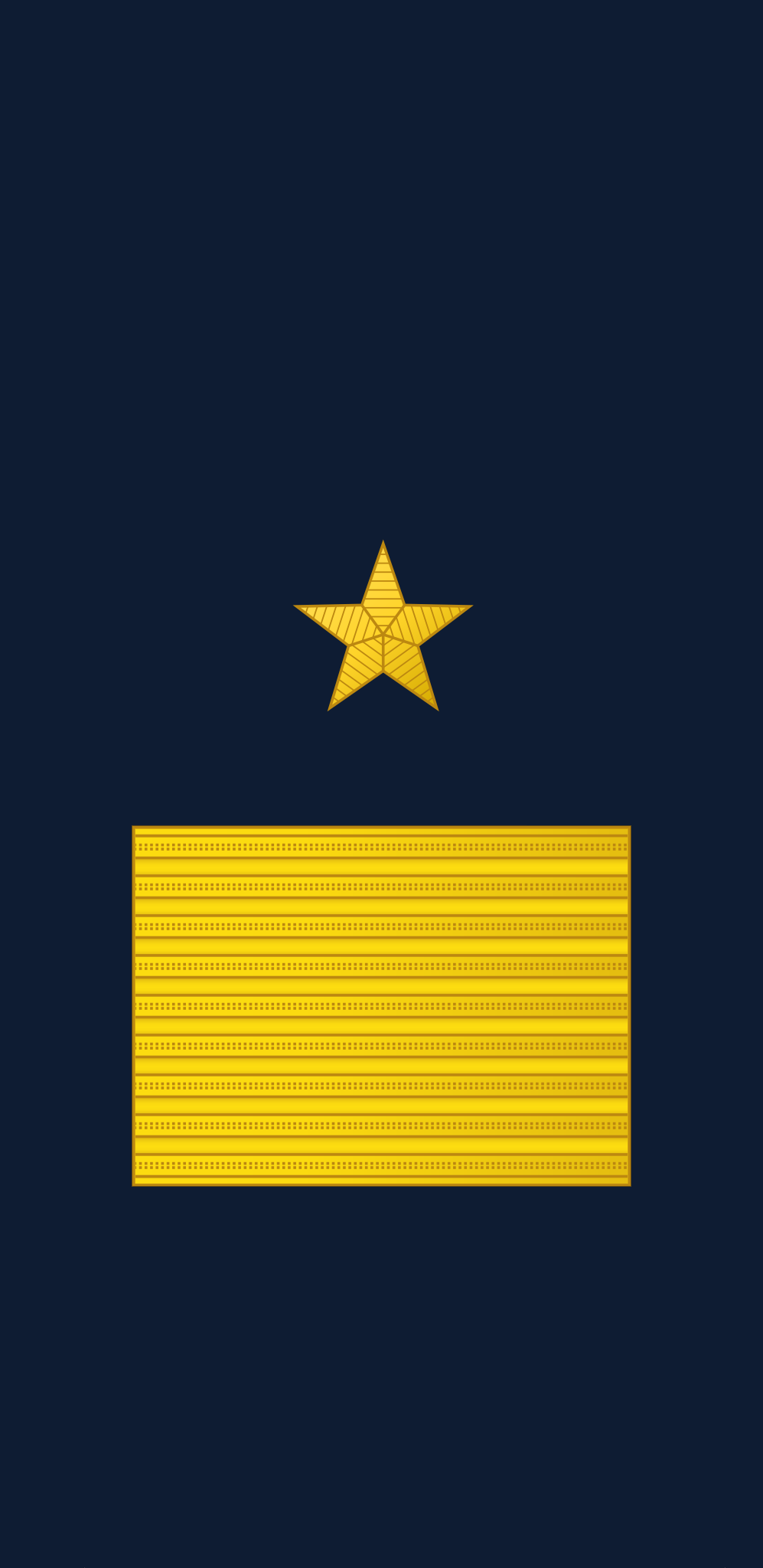
Branch	Land forces Armored corps / Medical service	Air Force	Border troops	Volksmarine
Shoulder board
Rank designation	Oberst			Kapitän zur See

Rank (GDR)
junior rank: Oberstleutnant	Oberst (Kapitän zur See)	senior rank: Generalmajor

=== Oberst in the Wehrmacht ===
Oberst was in the German Reich and Nazi Germany the highest field officer rank, comparable to the OF-5 rank in many NATO-Armed forces. It was equivalent to Kapitän zur See in the Kriegsmarine, and SS-Standartenführer in the Waffen-SS until 1945.

Branch	German Army	Luftwaffe	Waffen-SS	Kriegsmarine
Collar				None
Shoulder
Sleeve
Rank designation	Oberst		Standartenführer der Waffen-SS	Kapitän zur See

junior rank: Oberstleutnant	(German officer rank); Oberst (Kapitän zur See)	senior rank: Generalmajor

== Norway ==
The rank of oberst was introduced around the same time as Denmark, as Norway at the time was part of Denmark–Norway.

Rank insignia for oberst

Army

Air Force

== Sweden ==
The Swedish variant överste, is the most senior field grade military officer rank in the Swedish Army and the Swedish Air Force, immediately above the rank of lieutenant colonel and just below the rank of brigadier general. It is equivalent to the naval rank of captain in the Swedish Navy.

Rank insignia for överste

Army

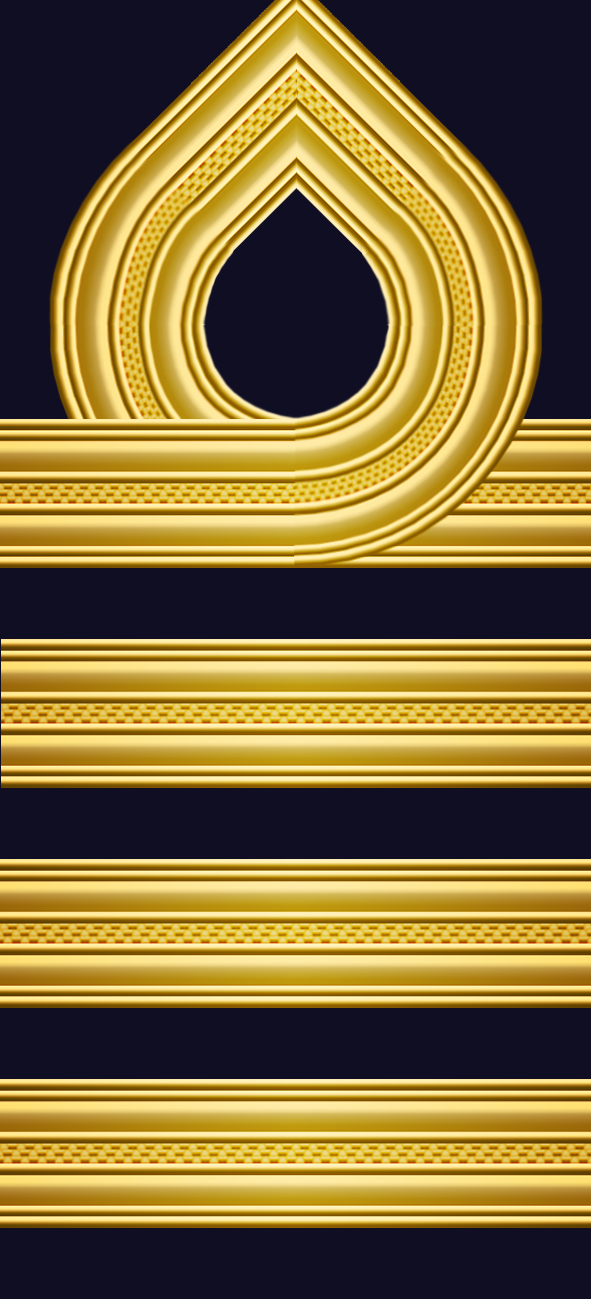
Amphibious Corps

Air Force

== Switzerland ==
Oberst
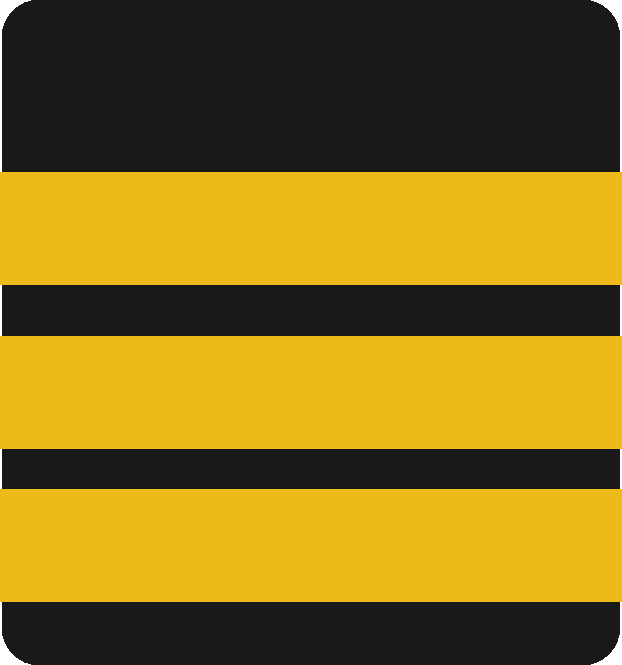
- Swiss and Swiss guard insignia
- Country: Switzerland; Vatican
- Service branch: Swiss Armed Forces (SAF); Swiss Guard (SG)
- Rank group: Senior officer
- Next higher rank: Brigadier (SAF)
- Next lower rank: Oberstleutnant (SAF & SG)

In the Swiss Army, the Oberst ranks above the lieutenant colonel ("Oberstleutnant") and below the brigadier general ("Brigadier"). In peacetime, it is the fourth highest officer rank.

The Oberst is the commander of a Kommando (Gren Kdo, Flpl Kdo), the army engineer staff, or an antiaircraft (Flab) cluster. These formations are comparable to regiments. As a staff officer, the Oberst performs various specialized functions in the staffs of the Army, Air Force, and territorial regions. In the brigades, the Oberst (in the general staff - "Oberst i Gst") performs the role of deputy commander and/or chief of staff. In the military justice system, the presidents of the military courts hold the rank of Oberst.
