= Lihuaxuella =

Scientific classification
- Domain: Bacteria
- Kingdom: Bacillati
- Phylum: Bacillota
- Class: Bacilli
- Order: Caryophanales
- Family: Thermoactinomycetaceae
- Genus: Lihuaxuella; Yu et al. 2013

Type species
- Lihuaxuella thermophila Yu et al. 2013

Species
- L. thermophila

Genus of bacteria

Lihuaxuella is a bacterial genus from the family Thermoactinomycetaceae. Up to now there is only on species of this genus known, Lihuaxuella thermophila.
