= Captain =

Title given to a commander

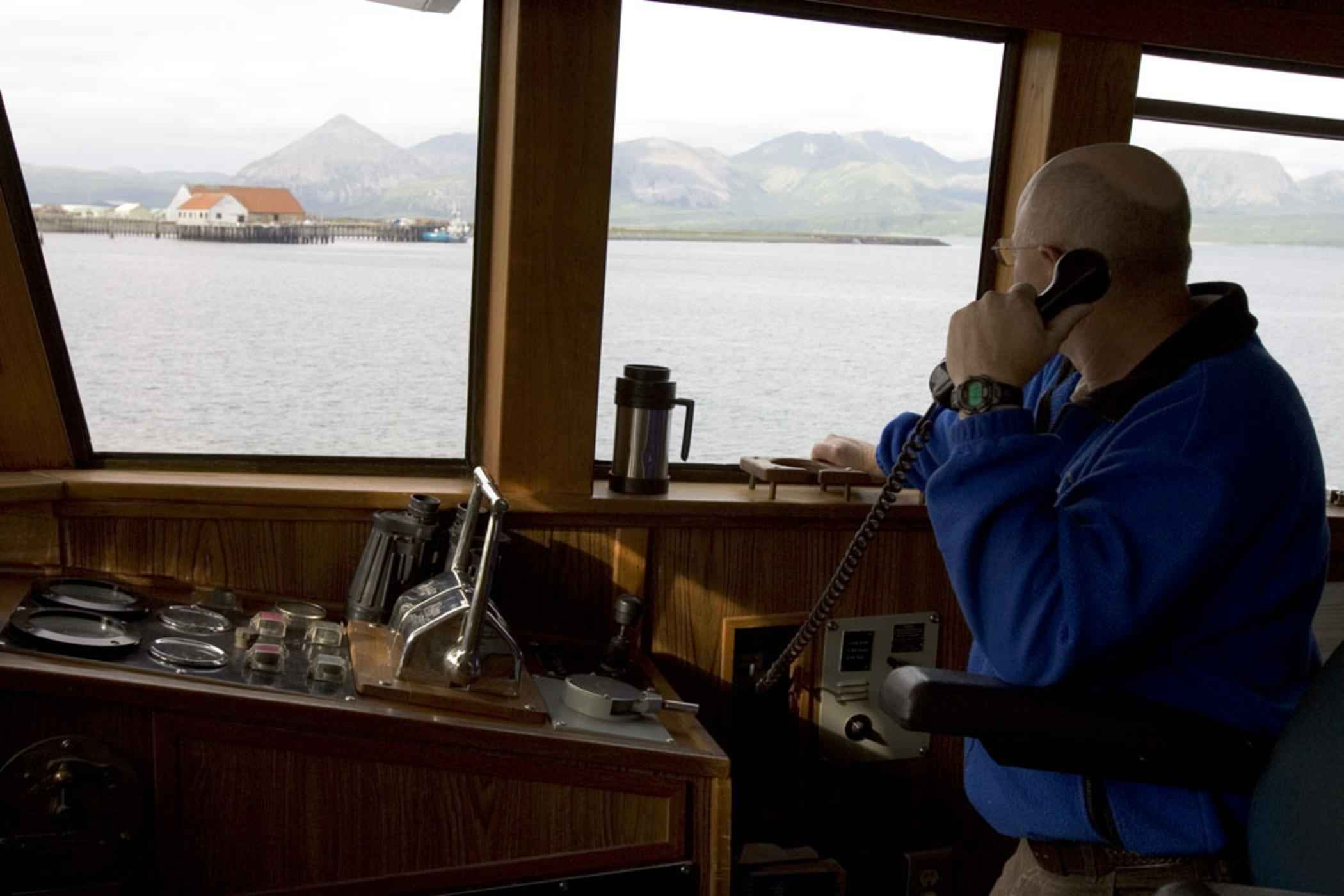
Captain of a ship during a U.S. Fish and Wildlife Service mission

Captain is a title, an appellative for the commanding officer of a military unit; the commander or highest rank officer of a navy ship, merchant ship, aeroplane, spacecraft, or other vessel; or the commander of a port, fire or police department, election precinct, etc. In militaries, the captain is typically at the level of an officer commanding a company or battalion of infantry, a ship, or a battery of artillery, or another distinct unit. It can also be a rank of command in an air force. The term also may be used as an informal or honorary title for persons in similar commanding roles.

== Etymology ==
The word "captain" derives from the Middle English "capitane", from Anglo-French "capitain", itself coming from the Latin "caput", meaning "head". It is considered cognate with the Greek word katepánō (Ancient Greek: κατεπάνω, lit. '[the one placed] at the top', or "the topmost"), which was used as title for a senior Byzantine military rank and office. The word was Latinized as Ancient Greek: capetanus or catepan. Both ultimately derive from the Proto-Indo-European "*káput", also meaning head.

== Occupations or roles ==
- Captain (armed forces), a commissioned officer rank corresponding to NATO OF-2 level. Typically commander of a company size unit, or equivalent. It is also a rank of command in the air force.
- Captain (naval), a commissioned officer rank in the navy, corresponding to the rank of Army colonel, Air force colonel.
- Captain (nautical), a licensed person or civilian marine officer who is legally in command of a merchant ship, a yacht or another type of vessel that may or may not be carrying passengers for hire; corresponds to the work condition of shipmaster or, as usually said, master.
- Captain (airlines), a licensed professional pilot who is legally in command of a civil aircraft; corresponding to the position of pilot in command (PIC).
- Fire captain, officer in a fire department.
- Police captain, officer in a police organization.
- Group captain, a senior commissioned rank in many air forces.
- Captain of industry, business leader.
- Captain of the port, harbour (UK) or Coast Guard (USA) post.
- Precinct captain, political party's representative at an election precinct in the United States.
- Barangay captain, Head of Barangay (Village) in the Philippines
- School captain, student elected or appointed to represent the school.
- Captain Regent, head of state of San Marino.
- Captain-major, colonial officer of a Portuguese possession.
- Captain-commandant, a Belgian military rank.
- Katepano, a senior Byzantine officer (and word from which "captain" derived).
- Kapudan Pasha
- Kapitan Cina
- Captal, a regional title in Southern France.

== Military ranks ==
=== Canada ===
- Captain (Canadian naval rank)
- Captain (Canadian army and air force)

=== Germany ===
- Kapitän bzw. "Kapitän zur See" (Deutsche Marine), Nato OF-5 grade
- Hauptmann, the german equivalent of Captain in Army (Armee/Heer) and Air Force (Luftwaffe)

=== India ===
- Captain (Indian Navy)
- Group captain (India)

=== Israel ===
- Seren, an Israel Defense Forces officer rank whether Army, Air Force, or Navy

=== South Africa ===
- Captain is a South African National Defence Force officer rank of the South African Army, South African Air Force, South African Navy, South African Military Health Service

=== United Kingdom ===
- Captain (Royal Navy), NATO OF-5 grade
- Captain (British Army and Royal Marines), NATO OF-2 grade
- Group Captain (Royal Air Force), NATO OF-5 grade

=== United States ===
- Captain (United States)
- Captain (United States O-3) (US Air Force, Army, Marine Corps, or Space Force)
- Captain (United States O-6) (US Navy, US Public Health Service, or Coast Guard)

=== Generic ===
- Captain (naval)
- Captain at sea
- Captain of sea and war
- Other captain grades
  - Ship-of-the-line captain
  - Senior Captain
  - Staff captain

== See also ==
- Captain (sports)
- Chief executive officer
- Capitaine (disambiguation)
- Capitan (disambiguation)
- El Capitan (disambiguation), Spanish for "The Captain"
- Kapitan (disambiguation)
