= Joseph Low =

American artist and illustrator

Joseph Charles Low
- Born: August 11, 1911; Coraopolis, Pennsylvania, U.S.
- Died: February 12, 2007 (aged 95); Edgartown, Massachusetts, U.S.
- Known for: Book illustrations

Joseph Charles Low (August 11, 1911 – February 12, 2007) was an American artist and children's book illustrator.

Low was born in Coraopolis, Pennsylvania. He made cover illustrations for The New Yorker between 1940 and 1980.

In 1953, Low authored and illustrated Mother Goose Riddle Rhymes, an inventive children's book of nursery rhymes named the "Best illustrated Children's Book of The Year" by the New York Times. Low's co-author was his wife Ruth.

He illustrated Jan de Hartog's novel, The Little Ark, which was published in 1953, and The Unabridged Devil's Dictionary by Ambrose Bierce in 1958. Low also illustrated God Returns to the Vuelta Abajo by Melanie Earle Keiser, published in 1936. He was a runner-up for the annual Caldecott Medal, recognizing his illustration of Mice Twice, a picture book that he also wrote (Atheneum Books, 1980).

He died in at his home in Edgartown, Massachusetts.
