= Melghirimyces =

Scientific classification
- Domain: Bacteria
- Kingdom: Bacillati
- Phylum: Bacillota
- Class: Bacilli
- Order: Caryophanales
- Family: Thermoactinomycetaceae
- Genus: Melghirimyces; Addou et al. 2012

Type species
- Melghirimyces algeriensis Addou et al. 2012

Species
- Melghirimyces algeriensis; Melghirimyces profundicolus; Melghirimyces thermohalophilus

Genus of bacteria

Melghirimyces is a bacterial genus from the family Thermoactinomycetaceae.

== Phylogeny ==
The currently accepted taxonomy is based on the List of Prokaryotic names with Standing in Nomenclature (LPSN) and National Center for Biotechnology Information (NCBI).

16S rRNA based LTP_10_2024

- - - Melghirimyces~
      - Melghirimyces profundicolus
      - Melghirimyces thermohalophilus
  - - Melghirimyces algeriensis
    - - Kroppenstedtia
      - other

120 marker proteins based GTDB 09-RS220

- - - Kroppenstedtia
    - - Melghirimyces
        - M. algeriensis Addou et al. 2012
        - - M. profundicolus Li et al. 2013
          - M. thermohalophilus Addou et al. 2012
  - other
