= Second Captain =

Second Captain may refer to:

- Flag captain, or second captain, serving as the ship captain of a flagship of a fleet under an admiral whose chief of staff was the first captain of the fleet.
- Junior captain, or second captain, a type of Captain (armed forces)
  - Second Captain, an antiquated rank below Captain (British Army and Royal Marines) used by the British Military during the 19th century, generally in the Ordnance and Royal Regiment of Artillery.
- Second Captains, an Irish media company
- Second Captains Live, Irish sports and entertainment show

== See also ==
- Captain (armed forces)
- Captain (disambiguation)
- First Captain (disambiguation)
