= First Captain =

First Captain may refer to:

- Senior Captain or First Captain, a rank of various armies
- Captain of the Fleet or First Captain, chief-of-staff to an admiral in charge of a fleet in the Royal Navy
- First Captain, the title given to the senior ranking cadet, the Brigade Commander, of the United States Military Academy or Virginia Military Institute, which is organized as a brigade, see United States Military Academy#Rank and organization

== See also ==
- Captain (armed forces)
- Captain (disambiguation)
- Second Captain (disambiguation)
