= Polycladomyces =

Scientific classification
- Domain: Bacteria
- Kingdom: Bacillati
- Phylum: Bacillota
- Class: Bacilli
- Order: Caryophanales
- Family: Thermoactinomycetaceae
- Genus: Polycladomyces; Tsubouchi et al. 2013

Type species
- Polycladomyces abyssicola Tsubouchi et al. 2013

Species
- Polycladomyces abyssicola; Polycladomyces subterraneus; Polycladomyces zharkentensis

Genus of bacteria

Polycladomyces is a bacterial genus from the family Thermoactinomycetaceae.

== Phylogeny ==
The currently accepted taxonomy is based on the List of Prokaryotic names with Standing in Nomenclature (LPSN) and National Center for Biotechnology Information (NCBI).

16S rRNA based LTP_10_2024

- Polycladomyces
  - P. abyssicola Tsubouchi et al. 2013
  - P. subterraneus Maneewong et al. 2017

120 marker proteins based GTDB 09-RS220

- Polycladomyces
  - P. abyssicola
  - P. subterraneus
