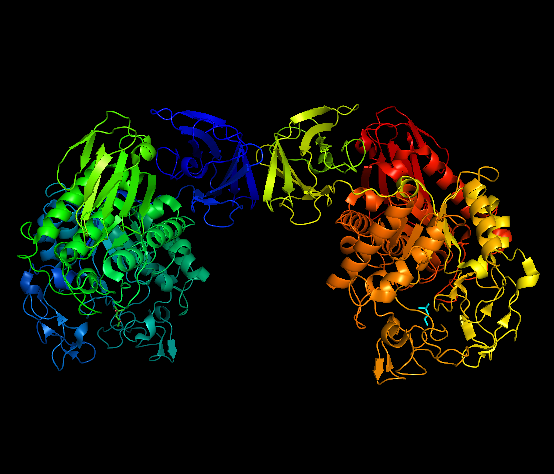
- View of Thermoactinomyces vulgaris neopulullanase showing dimeric structure

Scientific classification
- Domain: Bacteria
- Kingdom: Bacillati
- Phylum: Bacillota
- Class: Bacilli
- Order: Caryophanales
- Family: Thermoactinomycetaceae
- Genus: Thermoactinomyces
- Species: T. vulgaris

Binomial name
- Thermoactinomyces vulgaris Tsilinsky, 1899

Synonyms
- Thermoactinomyces candidus Kurup et al., 1975; Thermoactinomyces intermedius

= Thermoactinomyces vulgaris =

Bacterial species

Thermoactinomyces vulgaris is a species of bacteria.

The species is known to cause Farmer's lung.
