= CAPT =

CAPT may refer to:

- Canadian Association for Psychodynamic Therapy
- Canon Advanced Printing Technology
- Captain abbreviation
- Celina Aluminum Precision Technology
- Center for the Advancement of Process Technology
- Child Accident Prevention Trust
- Computer-aided pronunciation teaching
- Connecticut Academic Performance Test
