= The Peaceable Kingdom: An American Saga =

1972 book by Jan de Hartog

- Author: Jan de Hartog
- Cover artist: Harry Ford
- Language: English
- Genre: Historical
- Publisher: McClelland and Stewart
- Publication date: 1972
- Publication place: United States
- Pages: 783
- ISBN: 0-689-10482-0

The Peaceable Kingdom: An American Saga (1972) is a historical novel in two parts by the Dutch Quaker author Jan de Hartog. It describes the first meeting of George Fox and Margaret Fell, the latter's conversion, and a portion of the history of colonial Pennsylvania. The novel is split between two time frames and settings, 1652–53 in England and 1754–55 in Pennsylvania.

Martin Tucker, in a long review for The New York Times, describes the novel as a "moving story" but finds its discussion of Quaker philosophy to be overly simplified, noting a general "absence of intellectual depth"; he praises the novel's characterisations, particularly of Margaret Fell as a "complex, passionate, vibrant woman." A reviewer for Time magazine describes the book as "clumsily written" but praises it for successfully describing the "range of religious experience, from hot ecstasy to prim rule of procedure—and sometimes back again."
