= Shimazuella =

Scientific classification
- Domain: Bacteria
- Kingdom: Bacillati
- Phylum: Bacillota
- Class: Bacilli
- Order: Caryophanales
- Family: Thermoactinomycetaceae
- Genus: Shimazuella; Park et al. 2007

Type species
- Shimazuella kribbensis Park et al. 2007

Species
- Shimazuella alba; Shimazuella kribbensis; "Shimazuella soli"

Genus of bacteria

Shimazuella is a Gram-positive, aerobic and mesophilic bacterial genus from the family Thermoactinomycetaceae.

== Phylogeny ==
The currently accepted taxonomy is based on the List of Prokaryotic names with Standing in Nomenclature (LPSN) and National Center for Biotechnology Information (NCBI).

16S rRNA based LTP_10_2024

- Shimazuella
  - S. alba
  - S. kribbensis

120 marker proteins based GTDB 09-RS220

- Shimazuella
  - S. alba Saygin, Ay & Sahin 2021
  - - S. kribbensis Park et al. 2007
    - "S. soli" Jin et al. 2022
