= HMS Captain =

Seven ships of the Royal Navy have been named HMS Captain:

- HMS Captain (1678) was a 70-gun third rate launched in 1678. She was rebuilt in 1708 and again in 1722, and converted to a hulk in 1739, finally being broken up in 1762.
- HMS Captain (1743) was a 70-gun third rate launched in 1743. She was reduced to 64 guns in 1760, and converted to a storeship and renamed HMS Buffalo in 1777. She was broken up in 1783.
- HMS Captain (1787) was a 74-gun third rate launched in 1787. She was assigned to harbour service in 1809 and seriously damaged by an accidental fire in 1813 and broken up a few months later.
- HMS Captain was a 72-gun third rate launched in 1783 as HMS Carnatic. She was renamed HMS Captain in 1815 and was broken up in 1825.
- HMS Captain was a 100-gun first rate launched in 1786 as HMS Royal Sovereign. She was renamed HMS Captain when she was reduced to harbour service in 1825. She was broken up in 1841.
- HMS Captain was to have been an iron screw ship, but the name was changed and she was launched as HMS Agincourt in 1865.
- HMS Captain (1869) was a masted turret ship launched in 1869. She foundered in a gale in 1870 off Cape Finisterre.
