= Capitan =

Capitan and Kapitan are equivalents of the English Captain in other European languages.

Capitan, Capitano, and Kapitan may also refer to:

== Places in the United States ==
- Capitan, Louisiana, an unincorporated community
- Capitan, New Mexico, a village
- Capitan Mountains, New Mexico

== People ==
- George Kapitan, who wrote for Timely in the Golden Age of Comic Books.
- Tomis Kapitan, an American philosopher and Distinguished Teaching Professor Emeritus at Northern Illinois University.

== Arts and entertainment ==
- Der Kapitän or The Captain (film), a 1971 German comedy
- Der Kapitän (TV series), a German series
- Le Capitan, a novel by Michel Zevaco

== Other uses ==
- Kapitän, a shortened version of several ranks in the German navy
- Kapitan, another name for Opperhoofd, a Dutch colonial governor
- Opel Kapitän, a luxury car manufactured from 1938 to 1970
- Capitan (tequila), a brand of tequila produced by Barton Brands
- Capitan Records, a record label set up by American musician Chris Brokaw
- Capitán, a dog of Villa Carlos Paz who has spent six years in vigil at the grave of his master

== See also ==
- Barangay captain, usually referred in the Philippines as "kapitan"
- Capoten, a drug used for the treatment of hypertension
- El Capitan (disambiguation)
- Kapitan Arab, a Dutch East Indies title for the representative of Arab enclave
- Kapitan Cina or Capitan China, an originally Portuguese title for the representative of a Chinese enclave
- Kapitan Keling, a representative of an Indian community
- Kapudan Pasha, the admiral of the navy of the Ottoman Empire
- Katepano, a senior Byzantine military rank and office
