= The Captain (novel) =

1967 novel

- Author: Jan de Hartog
- Language: English
- Genre: Novel
- Publisher: Atheneum
- Publication date: 1966
- Pages: 434
- ISBN: 978-0933852839
- OCLC: 18383264
- LC Class: PZ3.H258 Cap2 PR6015.A674
- Website: archive.org/details/captain00deha via Internet Archive

The Captain is a 1967 novel by Dutch writer Jan de Hartog. It is a sequel of a sort to his 1940 book Captain Jan, though not having the same characters as the earlier book. Both books deal with the life of sailors in ocean-going tugboats - a field in which the Netherlands has great prominence. The earlier book dealt with the peacetime sailor protagonists' conflict with the exploiting, authoritarian Kwel Shipping Company which demands feudal-like fealty from its employees. In the present book this goes on under the extreme wartime conditions of WWII, with the Kwel company having escaped the occupied Netherlands and moved operations to London, its vessels contracted to take part in various Allied operations - particularly, the highly dangerous Arctic convoys. Even under these extreme conditions, the conflict between tyrannical bosses and rebellious sailors is still there, interweaving with the vast war against Nazi Germany.

== Plot summary ==
The frame story has Martinus Harinxma, a senior tugboat captain home after a long voyage, catching up on correspondence. He opens a letter from a young man who is the son of a Canadian naval officer killed aboard Harinxma's ship during escort duty during Second World War. In the letter, the son asks the Captain, "How was my father killed, and what was he really like?" As he begins to write the boy, Harinxma is forced to remember, and re-live the events surrounding the Canadian officer's time aboard his ship, and his eventual death.

In 1940 Harinxma, then a young tugboat officer, escapes to Britain. The Kwel company has managed to get away much of its fleet and personnel, one jump ahead of the advancing Germans, and sets up to continue operations from London. Harinxma gets his first command, at an earlier age and under much more difficult conditions than he would otherwise have had.

Central to the structure of the book are the complex relationships between the crew members, in whose depiction de Hartog's personal nautical experience is manifest. Among other things the young and inexperienced captain must face the dilemma of whether to cover up for a severe mishap by the ship's engineer, who is his personal friend, or report him for the sake of the ship's safety and risk his getting fired.

While still being merchant seamen not formally inducted into any navy, Harinxma and his fellow Dutch exile sailors are inexorably sucked into the fighting, their ships given (often inadequate) armaments and sent into some of the hottest arenas of the World War II naval war. Again clearly based on De Hartog's own experience, the book vividly conveys the feeling of suspicion and cordial dislike between the exiled Dutch and their British hosts and allies.

The Dutch sailors feel (and not entirely without reason) that they are being set up as cannon fodder (or rather, U-boat fodder). Many of Harinxma's fellow Dutch end up on the "South-Western Approaches" to the British Isles, acting as "stretcher-bearers of the sea" in submarine-infested waters – which turns out to be a task involving an extremely high casualty rate. (That experience had formed the background to a previous (1951) de Hartog novel, published variously under the names Stella and The Key and made into a film starring Sophia Loren).

Harinxma himself eventually ends up in an even more horrendous environment: the convoys to Murmansk, carrying the military matériel which the Soviet Union desperately needed to repulse the Nazi invasion of its territory. Wending their long way in frigid Arctic waters, the convoys were for most of their course extremely vulnerable to constant German submarine, warship and aerial attacks emanating from occupied Norway, making them among the war's most dangerous postings.

The same background, with the combination of extreme belligerent action and inhospitable nature pushing protagonists to the edge of endurance and beyond, was already the scene of HMS Ulysses, the first novel (1946) by Scottish author Alistair MacLean. While the two books have very different writing styles, characterization and underlying philosophy, they do share some plot elements.

Harinxma and his crew go again and again into that hell, with only short rest periods before they have to go there yet again. While under this constant danger, Harinxma gets into a personality conflict with a diminutive and touchy Royal Navy captain hailing from the Isle of Man, who first appears arrogant and ridiculous but ultimately sacrifices himself and goes to the bottom in a touching and heroic – yet believable – way.

In what would turn out to have a profound influence on his later life, Harinxma works with a sensitive young Canadian liaison officer posted to his ship, who quixotically dies in a futile attempt to shield an injured kitten from an attacking German plane. Later, Harinxma has a brief and guilt-ridden affair with the Canadian's widow.

Things come to a head in a particularly disastrous convoy of which few of the participating ships survive to reach their destination. In an author's note beginning the book, De Hartog notes the similarity between this episode in his book and the case of the historical ill-fated Convoy PQ 17 of July 1942 before going on to say emphatically that The Captain is a work of fiction.

Harinxma loses his ship, and very nearly his life, but purely by chance a depth charge falling from the ship sinks a German U-boat as well. He pulls from the oily water and into the lifeboat a German boy who was a cook's mate on the submarine and is its only survivor (and who would become a prosperous businessman in post-war Germany and send each year a big box of cakes to his Dutch saviour).

Sick and tired of war, Harinxma returns to London and confronts the formidable aging patriarch of the Kwel Company. He declares his firm decision to become a conscientious objector and quit the sea – and gets told "God has sown you on the bridge of a tugboat, and there you will grow".

Eventually, a deep-seated feeling of loyalty to all the Dutch and British who sailed with him and went to the bottom impels Harinxma to indeed take up again command of a ship – but a completely unarmed one, where he would be exposed to the full risk of German attacks but not be in a position to kill anybody even inadvertently.

This message reflects the position of de Hartog himself, who became more and more of a pacifist towards the end of the war years and eventually joined the outspokenly pacifist Quakers. What saves the book from becoming an ideological tract is the wry sense of humour evident even in manifestly non-humorous situations, and the first-person narrator's ability to laugh at himself.

Harinxma returned in several later de Hartog books, such as The Commodore and The Centurion.

== See also ==
- Arctic convoys of World War II
- HMS Rawalpindi, an armed merchant cruiser that sacrificed herself by attacking a German warship.
- HMS Ulysses (novel) with the same background
