= Desmospora =

Scientific classification
- Domain: Bacteria
- Kingdom: Bacillati
- Phylum: Bacillota
- Class: Bacilli
- Order: Caryophanales
- Family: Thermoactinomycetaceae
- Genus: Desmospora; Yassin et al. 2009

Type species
- Desmospora activa Yassin et al. 2009

Species
- Desmospora activa; Desmospora profundinema

Synonyms
- Catenispora

Genus of bacteria

Desmospora is a bacterial genus from the family Thermoactinomycetaceae.

== Phylogeny ==
The currently accepted taxonomy is based on the List of Prokaryotic names with Standing in Nomenclature (LPSN) and National Center for Biotechnology Information (NCBI).

16S rRNA based LTP_10_2024

- Desmospora
  - D. activa Yassin et al. 2009
  - D. profundinema Zhang et al. 2015

120 marker proteins based GTDB 09-RS220

- Desmospora
  D. activa
