= Love Steals Us from Loneliness =

2005 single by Idlewild

Single by Idlewild

from the album Warnings/Promises
- Released: 21 February 2005
- Genre: Alternative
- Length: 3:12
- Label: Parlophone
- Songwriters: Bob Fairfoull, Colin Newton, Rod Jones, Allan Stewart, Roddy Woomble
- Producer: Tony Hoffer

Idlewild singles chronology
"A Modern Way of Letting Go" (2003)	"Love Steals Us from Loneliness" (2005)	"I Understand It" (2005)

"Love Steals Us from Loneliness" is a song by Scottish rock band Idlewild, from their fourth studio album, Warnings/Promises (2005). It was released as the lead single from the album on 21 February 2005 and charted at number 16 on the UK Singles Chart and number 37 in Ireland.

This song was featured on a Kerrang compilation CD entitled Kerrang! Under the Influence: The Songs That Inspired My Chemical Romance, as My Chemical Romance had cited Idlewild, and more explicitly "Love Steals Us from Loneliness", as a major influence.

== Background ==
According to Colin Newton, the band was not:

"intending to release any singles at all from this record to start with. It was like a grudging truce between ourselves and the record company to put out "Love Steals Us From Loneliness" as the first single from Warnings/Promises, although with hindsight I guess that was the most obvious choice and perfectly bridges where we were with the last album and where we are now.

== Track listings ==
UK 7" R6658, CD CDR6658

1. "Love Steals Us from Loneliness"
2. "Hold On To Your Breath"

UK CD 1 CDRS6658

1. "Love Steals Us from Loneliness"
2. "Gone Too Long"
3. "Don't Let Me Change"
4. "Love Steals Us from Loneliness" (video)
5. Making Of - CD-Rom Footage

UK CD 2 CDR6658

1. "Love Steals Us from Loneliness"
2. "Hold On To Your Breath"

== Charts ==
Chart (2005)	Peak position
Ireland (IRMA)	37
Scotland Singles (OCC)	6
UK Singles (OCC)	16
