= Titan (steam tug) =

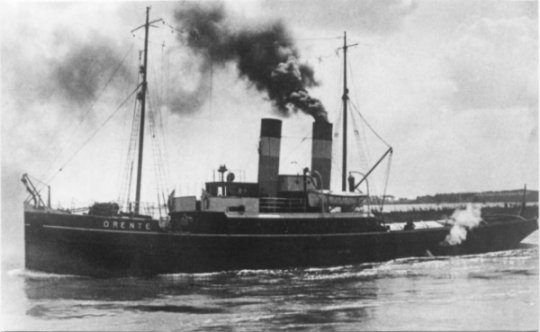
- As Drente II in the service of Wijsmuller

History

Netherlands
- Name: Titan
- Owner: 1894-1919 Zur Mühlen & Co.; 1919 Internationale Sleepdienst Maatschappij; 1919-1935 Bureau Wijsmuller
- Builder: NV werf v/h Rijkee & Co., Rotterdam
- Yard number: 70
- Launched: 13 August 1894
- Maiden voyage: 3 October 1894
- In service: 7 October 1894
- Out of service: 19 October 1935
- Fate: Grounded 19 October 1935 and scrapped in situ

General characteristics
- Type: Steam tug
- Tonnage: 352 grt
- Length: 44.83 m
- Beam: 7.39 m
- Depth: 3.89 m
- Installed power: steam engine
- Propulsion: propeller
- Speed: 10 kn

The Titan (later: Drente) was a steam tug that was built in 1894 and sailed for three Dutch tug companies until it was decommissioned in 1935.

== History ==
At the yard, NV werf v/h Rijkee & Co. in Rotterdam, the Titan was launched on 13 August 1894. It was towed to Vlissingen where De Schelde installed the engine and boiler. In October the same year it was handed over to the company Zur Mühlen & Co., and put in service. The tug had an engine of a 1000hp and it could load 280 tonnes of coal, giving it a range of 7418 km. It was mainly active in the waters around northwest Europe, but also did assignments to the United States. In 1913 the Titan, together with the Atlas of the same company, towed a dry dock from Texel in the Netherlands to Surabaya in the Dutch East Indies. She did work for the Royal Netherlands Navy as well as for the merchant navy, towing the Gelderland in 1900 and the Evertsen in 1905.

In the course of World War I Zur Mühlen got into difficulties and the company was liquidated in 1918–20. The Titan was sold to Smit International in 1919 and renamed Hudson. Smit sold it to Bureau Wijsmuller later that same year and it was put in service as Drente. For Wijsmuller the tug did much the same work as it did for its previous owners.

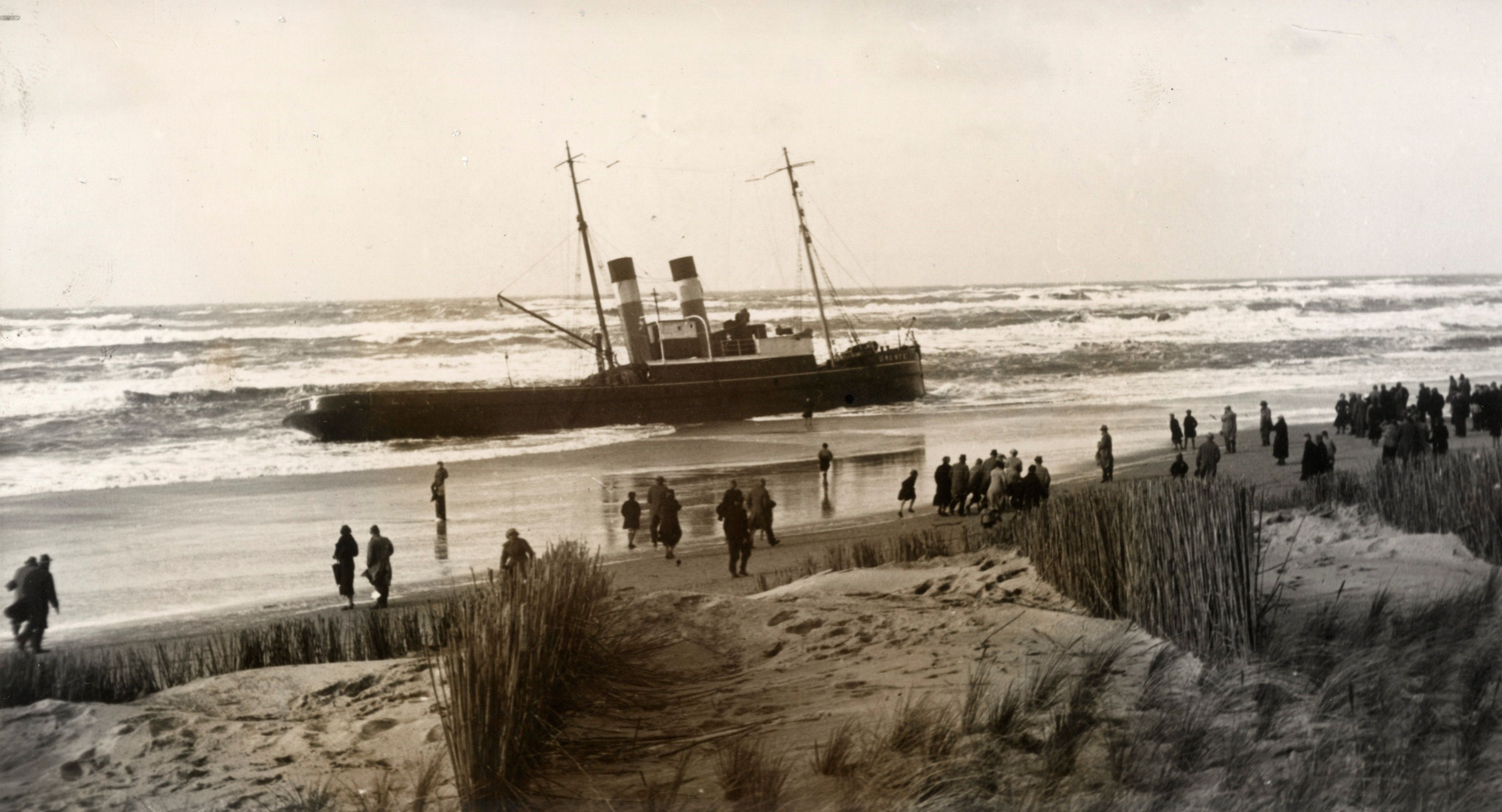
The Drente on the beach

On 19 October 1935 the freighter Kerkplein called for assistance. The Drente responded and tried to take the Kerkplein in tow. The towing line broke three times and ended up in the propeller of the tug the third time. Both ships ran aground near Egmond aan Zee. Because of its age decommissioning was decided for the Drente and it was demolished on the beach.

== Sources ==
- (in Dutch) Ship entry, bureau-wijsmuller.nl
- (in Dutch) De ondergang van de Drente (II) 1935, zeesleepvaart.com
