= Marininema =

Scientific classification
- Domain: Bacteria
- Kingdom: Bacillati
- Phylum: Bacillota
- Class: Bacilli
- Order: Caryophanales
- Family: Thermoactinomycetaceae
- Genus: Marininema; Li et al. 2012

Type species
- Marininema mesophilum Li et al. 2012

Species
- Marininema halotolerans; Marininema mesophilum

Synonyms
- Marina

Genus of bacteria

Marininema is a bacterial genus from the family Thermoactinomycetaceae.

== Phylogeny ==
The currently accepted taxonomy is based on the List of Prokaryotic names with Standing in Nomenclature (LPSN) and National Center for Biotechnology Information (NCBI).

16S rRNA based LTP_10_2024

- Marininema
  - M. halotolerans Zhang et al. 2013
  - M. mesophilum Li et al. 2012

120 marker proteins based GTDB 09-RS220

- Marininema
  - M. halotolerans
  - M. mesophilum
