= El Capitan (ferry) =

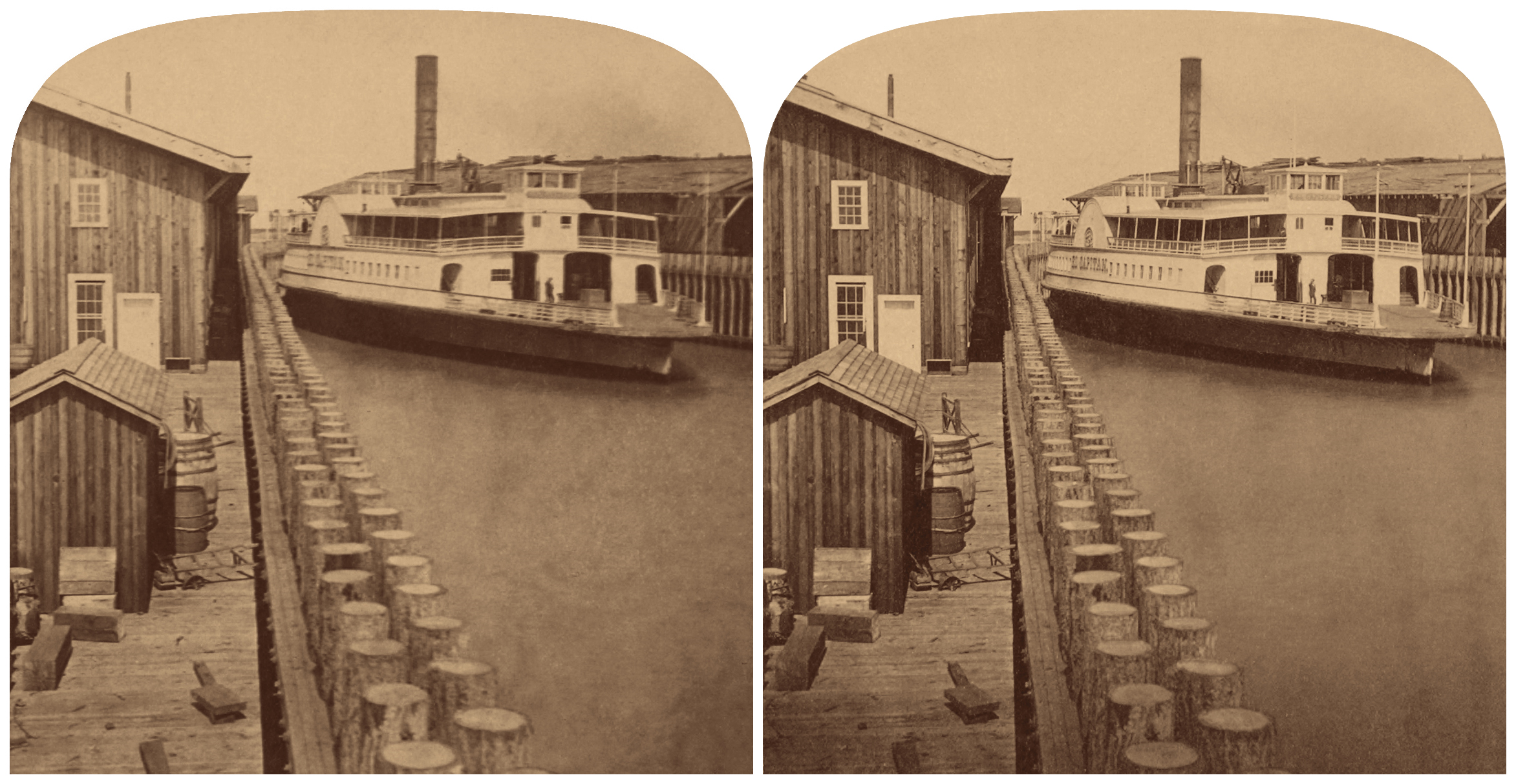
- El Capitan was the largest ferry on San Francisco Bay when built in 1868

History
- Name: El Capitan
- Owner: 1868-1885: Central Pacific Railroad; 1885-1925: Southern Pacific
- Operator: 1868-1885: Central Pacific Railroad; 1885-1925: Southern Pacific
- Port of registry: San Francisco, USA
- Builder: Patrick Tiernan, San Francisco
- Completed: 1868
- In service: 1868-1925
- Out of service: 1925
- Identification: Official Number: 8230

General characteristics
- Type: Passenger ferry
- Tonnage: 982
- Displacement: 669
- Length: 194 ft (59 m)
- Beam: 33.6 ft (10.2 m)
- Depth: 14.5 ft (4.4 m)
- Installed power: Total 250 hp from 4 fire tube boilers
- Propulsion: side wheels powered by a vertical beam engine steam engine
- Crew: 14

El Capitan was a side-wheel steam-powered passenger ferry operated on San Francisco Bay. The ferry was built for the Central Pacific Railroad in 1868 in anticipation of completion of the First transcontinental railroad. The ferry offered connecting service to San Francisco for train passengers arriving in Oakland, California. El Capitan collided with the Central Pacific ferry Alameda in dense fog on 20 February 1879. The hull flooded from a hole forward of the port side paddle box, and the ferry sank onto a mud bar. She was towed to a shipyard for repair the following day. El Capitan spent its last decade crossing the Carquinez Strait between Crockett and Vallejo before being retired in 1925.
