= Numidum =

Scientific classification
- Domain: Bacteria
- Kingdom: Bacillati
- Phylum: Bacillota
- Class: Bacilli
- Order: Bacillales
- Family: Bacillaceae
- Genus: Numidum; Tidjani Alou et al. 2016

Type species
- Numidum massiliense Tidjani Alou et al. 2016

Species
- N. massiliense

Genus of bacteria

Numidum is a Gram-positive and facultative anaerobic genus of bacteria from the family of Bacillaceae with one known species (Numidum massiliense) which has been isolated from the human gut.

== See also ==
- List of bacterial orders
- List of bacteria genera
