= A Modern Way of Letting Go =

Single by Idlewild

from the album The Remote Part
- Released: February 2003
- Recorded: ?
- Genre: Alternative rock
- Label: Parlophone
- Songwriter(s): Bob Fairfoull, Colin Newton, Rod Jones, Allan Stewart, Roddy Woomble
- Producer(s): Dave Eringa

Idlewild singles chronology
"Live in a Hiding Place" (2002)	"A Modern Way of Letting Go" (2003)	"Love Steals Us from Loneliness" (2005)

"A Modern Way of Letting Go" is a song by Scottish rock band Idlewild, from their 2002 album The Remote Part. It was the fourth and last single taken from the album and charted at #28 in the UK Singles Chart (see 2003 in British music).

The song is featured in the 2005 video game Midnight Club 3: DUB Edition by Rockstar.

== Track listings ==
=== In the UK ===
- Limited edition CD
1. "A Modern Way of Letting Go"
2. "In Remote Part/Scottish Fiction (Live)"
3. "A Modern Way of Letting Go (Live)"
- DVD
1. "A Modern Way of Letting Go" Music video
2. "In Remote Part: New York footage 2002" Video
3. "(I Am) What I Am Not (Live)" Audio track
4. Photo gallery
- 7"
1. "A Modern Way of Letting Go"
2. "A Modern Way of Letting Go (Live)"
