= Planifilum =

Scientific classification
- Domain: Bacteria
- Kingdom: Bacillati
- Phylum: Bacillota
- Class: Bacilli
- Order: Caryophanales
- Family: Thermoactinomycetaceae
- Genus: Planifilum; Hatayama et al. 2005

Type species
- Planifilum fimeticola Hatayama et al. 2005

Species
- P. caeni; P. composti; P. fimeticola; P. fulgidum; P. yunnanense

Genus of bacteria

Planifilum is a Gram-positive and aerobic bacterial genus from the family Thermoactinomycetaceae.

== Phylogeny ==
The currently accepted taxonomy is based on the List of Prokaryotic names with Standing in Nomenclature (LPSN) and National Center for Biotechnology Information (NCBI).

16S rRNA based LTP_10_2024

- Planifilum
  - P. composti Han et al. 2013
  - - P. fimeticola Hatayama et al. 2005
    - - P. fulgidum Hatayama et al. 2005
      - P. yunnanense Zhang, Dong & Biao 2007

120 marker proteins based GTDB 09-RS220

- Planifilum
  - P. fimeticola
  - P. fulgidum
