= Capitaine =

Capitaine, derived from the French for Captain, may also refer to:

- Hogfish (Lachnolaimus maximus), an edible marine fish in the family Labridae, found in the western Atlantic
- Nile perch (Lates niloticus), a freshwater fish in the family Centropomidae, important as food in much of Africa
- USS Capitaine (SS-336), a Balao class submarine of the United States Navy

== See also ==
- Capitaine de vaisseau, a French naval rank
