= El Capitan (Idlewild song) =

2005 single by Idlewild

Single by Idlewild

from the album Warnings/Promises
- Released: 11 July 2005
- Genre: Alternative rock
- Length: 3:57
- Label: Parlophone
- Songwriter(s): Bob Fairfoull, Colin Newton, Rod Jones, Allan Stewart, Roddy Woomble
- Producer(s): Tony Hoffer

Idlewild singles chronology
"I Understand It" (2005)	"El Capitan" (2005)	"As If I Hadn't Slept" (2006)

"El Capitan" is a song by Scottish rock band Idlewild from their fourth studio album, Warnings/Promises (2005). It was released as the third single from the album on 11 July 2005 and charted at No. 39 in the UK Singles Chart.

The Walkmen's Paul Maroon plays piano on the track.

The title and lyrics refer to the El Capitan granite formation in Yosemite Valley, California.

== Track listings ==
=== In the UK ===
All songs by Idlewild unless otherwise stated.

- 7" R6667
1. "El Capitan"
2. "The Bronze Medal (acoustic)"
- 7" (red vinyl) R6667X
1. "El Capitan (acoustic)"
2. "Winter Is Blue (acoustic)" (Vashti Bunyan)
- CD CDRS6667
1. "El Capitan"
2. "El Capitan (acoustic)"
3. "Winter Is Blue (acoustic)" (Bunyan)
