= Kapitän =

Kapitän (German: [kapiˈtɛːn]) is the German word for Captain. It is also a shortened version of several ranks in the German navy, ranging from Korvettenkapitän to Kapitän zur See. The general meaning is equivalent to Captain.
