= Thermoactinomycetaceae =

Scientific classification
- Domain: Bacteria
- Kingdom: Bacillati
- Phylum: Bacillota
- Class: Bacilli
- Order: Caryophanales
- Family: Thermoactinomycetaceae; Matsuo et al. 2006

Genera
- See text

Synonyms
- Novibacillaceae Jiang et al. 2019

Family of bacteria

The Thermoactinomycetaceae are a family of Gram-positive endospore-forming bacteria.

== Phylogeny ==
The currently accepted taxonomy is based on the List of Prokaryotic names with Standing in Nomenclature (LPSN) and National Center for Biotechnology Information (NCBI).

16S rRNA based LTP_10_2024

- - - Thermoactinomycetales Thermoactinomycetaceae
      - - Shimazuella Park et al. 2007
        - - Risungbinella Kim et al. 2015
          - - Geothermomicrobium Zhou et al. 2014
            - - Baia Guan et al. 2015
              - Croceifilum Hatayama & Kuno 2015
      - - - - Thermoflavimicrobium Yoon et al. 2005
            - - Hazenella Buss et al. 2013
              - Polycladospora Mo et al. 2023
          - - Lihuaxuella Yu et al. 2013
            - - - Staphylospora Wang et al. 2019
                - Thermoactinomyces Tsiklinsky 1899
              - - Paenactinomyces Jiang et al. 2019
                - - Thermoactinomyces daqus
                  - Laceyella Yoon et al. 2005
        - - - Seinonella Yoon et al. 2005
            - Mechercharimyces Matsuo et al. 2006
          - - - Polycladomyces Tsubouchi et al. 2013
              - Planifilum Hatayama et al. 2005
            - - Marinithermofilum Zhang et al. 2015
              - - Melghirimyces~
                - - Melghirimyces algeriensis Addou et al. 2012
                  - - Kroppenstedtia von Jan et al. 2011
                    - - Paludifilum Frikha-Dammak et al. 2016
                      - - Desmospora Yassin et al. 2009
                        - - Salinithrix Zarparvar et al. 2014
                          - Marininema Li et al. 2012
  - - - - Novibacillaceae
          Novibacillus Yang, Chen & Zhou 2015
      - other
    - other

120 marker proteins based GTDB 09-RS220

- Thermoactinomycetales
  - - Novibacillaceae
      - "Numidum" Tidjani Alou et al. 2016
      - Novibacillus
  - - - - "Polycladomycesaceae"
          Polycladomyces
        - "Planifilaceae"
          Planifilum
      - - "Desmosporaceae"
          - Marinithermofilum
          - - - Kroppenstedtia
              - Melghirimyces
            - - - Kroppenstedtia pulmonis
                - Paludifilum
              - - Desmospora
                - Marininema
    - - JANTPT01
        Mechercharimyces
      - Thermoactinomycetaceae
        - Seinonella
        - - Thermoflavimicrobium
          - - - Baia [incl. Croceifilum]
              - - Risungbinella
                - Shimazuella
            - - Hazenella
              - - - Lihuaxuella
                  - Paenactinomyces
                - - Staphylospora
                  - - Laceyella
                    - Thermoactinomyces
