= SS Ursus =

Compagnie Générale Transatlantique tugboat (1922–1940)

- The tugboat Ursus at Le Havre.

History
- Name: HMT Cynic
- Operator: The Admiralty
- Port of registry: (United Kingdom of Great Britain and Ireland)
- Builder: Bow, McLachlan and Company, Paisley
- Yard number: 306
- Launched: 28 September 1916
- In service: 1917
- Out of service: 1922
- Fate: Sold to the Compagnie Générale Transatlantique
- Notes: Laid down as Juan Soverny for Chile and purchased by the Admiralty while under construction

History
- Name: Ursus
- Owner: Compagnie Générale Transatlantique
- Operator: Compagnie Générale Transatlantique
- Port of registry: France
- Acquired: 1922
- In service: 1922
- Out of service: 29 April 1945
- Fate: Bombed and sunk 1945, raised and scrapped several years later
- Notes: Tug at Le Havre

General characteristics
- Type: Tugboat
- Tonnage: 472 GRT
- Length: 141.6 ft (43.2 m)
- Beam: 29.1 ft (8.9 m)
- Depth: 14.9 ft (4.5 m)
- Installed power: 1,200 hp (890 kW)
- Propulsion: Twin screws
- Speed: 12 knots (22 km/h; 14 mph)

SS Ursus was a tugboat operated by the Compagnie Générale Transatlantique from 1922 to 1940.

== Early history ==
She was built by Bow, McLachlan and Company in Paisley for Chile in 1916, and laid down under the name Juan Soverny, but was purchased by the Admiralty while still under construction and renamed Cynic. The tug was launched on 28 September 1916 and entered service a year later as a towing vessel.

== French Line service ==
Cynic was sold to the Compagnie Générale Transatlantique in 1922 and was converted into a tender for Le Havre service, and renamed Ursus. The tug served with fellow CGT tug Titan, assisting the largest of the company's liners.

On 8 October 1926 Ursus was accidentally rammed by SS Paris at the entrance of the harbor in Le Havre, where she sank with the loss of 10 crew. The tug was raised in February of the following year and returned to service.

Titan and Ursus were joined by the newly purchased Minotaure, ex-Romsey in 1929 as Le Havre tenders. The three tugs assisted in the launch of the ocean liner Normandie on 29 October 1932, and later participated together in the rescue of the battleship Jean Bart in mid-June 1940. While under construction at Saint-Nazaire, Germany won the Battle of France and the battleship had to be evacuated to evade advancing German troops. Minotaure, Titan, and Ursus towed her to Casablanca, where she would remain until late 1945.

Ursus was seized by the Germans on 30 July 1940 at Bordeaux, and used by the Kriegsmarine. On 29 April 1945 the tug was bombed by Allied aircraft and sunk in the Baltic Sea, near Brunsbuttel. She was declared a war loss in 1947 and in the early 1950s was raised and subsequently scrapped.
