= SS Titan =

SS Titan may refer to:

- SS Titan, the fictional title ship in the 1898 novella Futility, or the Wreck of the Titan, which presented a scenario similar to the real-life sinking of RMS Titanic some 14 years later
- SS Titan (1943), a Type C2-S-B1 ship; later renamed American Packer; scrapped in 1970
- SS Titan (1894), a tugboat and tender operated by the French Line from 1894 until her scrapping in 1957
