= Admiralty tug =

Type of tugboat

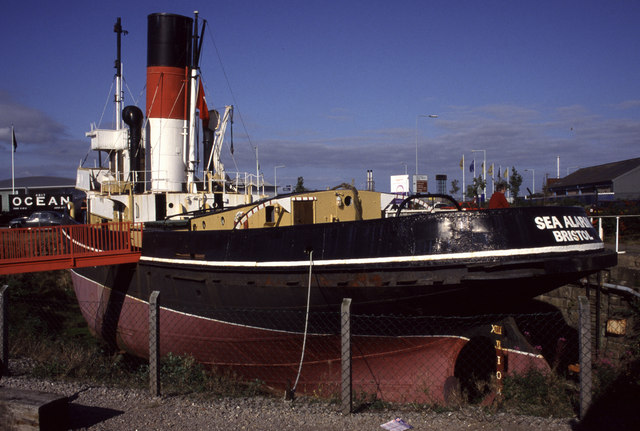
Sea Alarm, formerly named Empire Ash

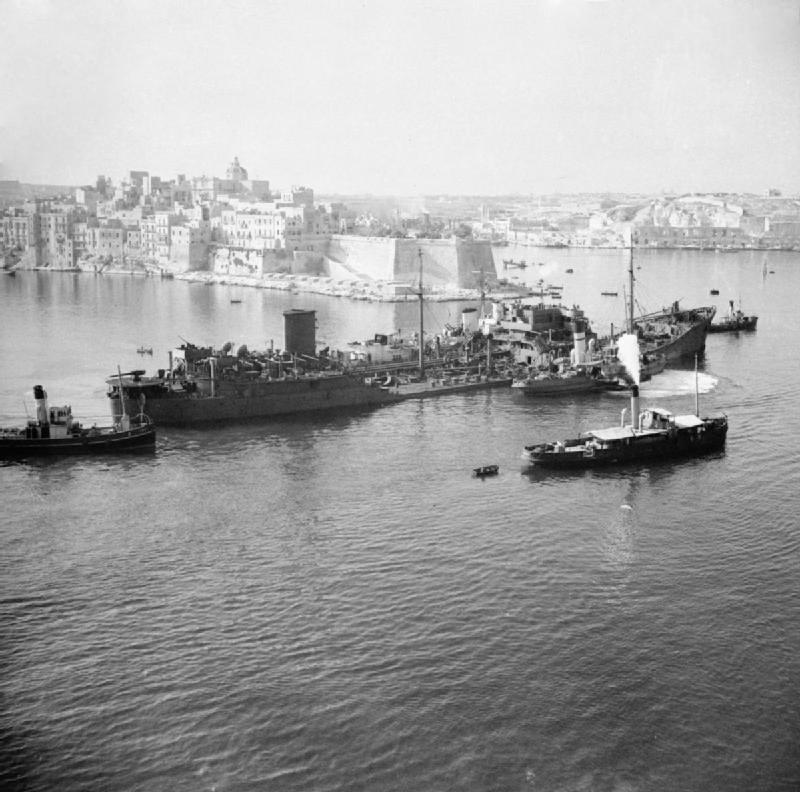
The tanker SS Ohio at the end of Operation Pedestal with its vital cargo of fuel, towed into Valletta Harbour, Malta with other tugs assisting 15 August 1942

Admiralty tugs were tugboats built for and operated by the Royal Navy. These were vessels built to Admiralty specifications and in specific classes during the First and Second World Wars. They were built to meet the Royal Navy's demand for auxiliary vessels and to supplement the civilian tugs requisitioned by the Admiralty for war service.

== First World War ==
At the outbreak of the First World War the Royal Navy owned seven fleet tugs, mainly civilian vessels purchased as required, employed in normal tug duties at naval ports. When war commenced the Admiralty put in train plans to requisition civilian tugs to meet the need for vessels to work as patrol vessels, minesweepers, anti-submarine warfare vessels and a host of routine duties. In all, over 100 civilian tugs were requisitioned in this way.

There was an increased need for boats to act on the salvage and rescue of ships attacked and damaged on the high seas, for which the civilian fleet was not sufficient. To meet this need the Admiralty placed an order for 64 sea-going tugs to operate in this capacity. These were to a single design, based on a civilian type, and, as they were built by specialist shipyards, incorporated merchant rather than navy features. However it was specified they be armed and equipped with radio.

The main class of Admiralty tug was the Saint-class (named after British localities beginning with "St", eg St Abbs). Of 64 ordered, 46 were completed and commissioned before the end of hostilities. The second class was the Resolve (also called Rollicker or Hunter, after Sir David Hunter) class, six large ocean-going tugs for duty on the high seas, but these were incomplete at the war's end. Their names were Resolve, Respond, Retort, Rollicker, Roysterer, and Rollcall.

In addition the Admiralty built several classes of small tugs, including 10 Robust-class paddle tugs, and 6 West-class harbour tugs, and several classes of tugs for special duties. 15 vessels were built to tugboat design for use as boarding vessels in the Thames estuary and another 13 for use in the Mersey. They also built 12 tugs (the Crete-class, a further 12 were cancelled) of ferro-concrete construction employed towing ferro-concrete barges between England and France.

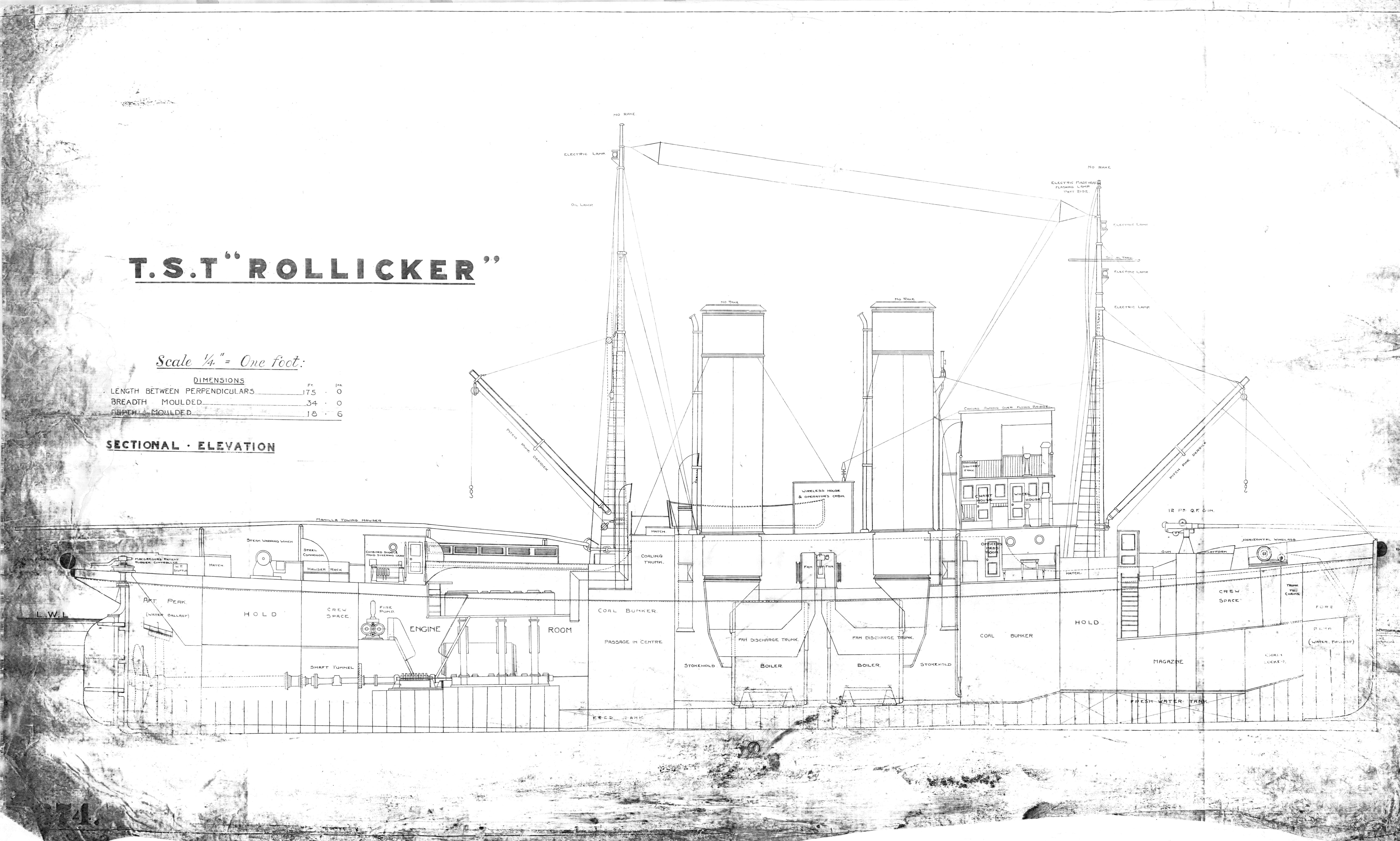
General arrangement of the ex Royal Navy tug TST Rollicker, as in ownership by the Australian coal firm J & A Brown.

=== First World War tugs ===
Rescue tugs of the First World War
Class	Built	Builder(s)	Tonnage (GRT) /displacement	Dimensions	Engines	Armament	Notes
Saint	1918	Ferguson, Day Summers, Crabtree, Harland and Wolff	800t (440 GRT)	143 ft length x29ft width 12 ft draught	1250 ihp 12kn	1x 12-pdr	46 built 16 cancelled
Resolve	1918/9	Ferguson, Ayrshire, Day Summers, Thornycroft	739-842grt 1400 t displacement	182 ft overall x 34 ft x 15 ft	2400 ihp 14kn	1x12pdr	6 built

Harbour tugs of the First World War
Class	Built	Tonnage (GRT)	Dimensions	Engines	Armament	Notes
Robust	1909-1915	700t 635 tons displacement	144 ft (pp) x 27 ft x 11 ft	2x reciprocating double expansion 1250 ihp 12kn		10 built plus HMT Pert, an enlarged design
West	1919	131-161 tons gross	. 88 ft (pp) x 21ft x 9ft (deep)	Compound 430 ihp 10kn		11 built, 6 cancelled

== Second World War ==
HMRT Dexterous (W111), an Assurance-class tug, September 1942.

In World War II a similar situation arose; the Admiralty again requisitioned civilian tugs and placed orders for a range of Admiralty tugs. In all 117 harbour tugs were brought into service, including the ten Robust- and six West-class vessels (built in World War I and now in civilian service) and 101 others of various design. Just two harbour tugs were built for the Admiralty during World War II, the Alligator-class.

Prior to 1939 the Royal Navy had built four Brigand-class rescue tugs for its own use; at the outbreak of World War II a further 74 civilian tugs were requisitioned, including 16 Saint and five Rollicker class of World War I vintage, and 53 others. At the same time orders were placed for 21 Admiralty tugs, the Assurance-class, the first being delivered in 1940. In 1942 a further 23 Favourite-class, and eight Bustler-class tugs were built, followed in 1944 by six Envoy-class tugs. A number of US Rescue Tugs were also supplied under the Lend-Lease programme. These long-range Rescue Tugs were ocean-going ships which often accompanied convoys and operated in all theatres of the war. They were largely crewed by experienced Merchant Seamen recruited into the Royal Navy under T124 articles and formed a specialist unit known as His Majesty's Rescue Tug Service (commanded from HMS Minona moored in Campbeltown in Scotland). These vessels were supplemented by a number of similar vessels owned by the Ministry of War Transport (MoWT) and operated on their behalf by private shipping companies (notably the United Towing Company based in Hull). Most of the RN and MoWT Rescue Tugs were disposed of at the war's end.)

Rescue tugs of the Second World War
Class	Built	Tonnage (GRT)	Dimensions	Engines	Armament	Notes
Saint	1918	800t		1250 hp 12kn	1x12pdr	18 in service 9 lost
Rollicker	1919	1400t		2400 hp 14kn	1x12pdr	5 in service no losses
Brigand	1938	840t		3000 hp 15.5kn	1x3in gun 1x20mm 2xMG	4 built 1 lost
Assurance	1940	700t		1350 hp 14kn	1x3in 2x20mm 2xMG	21 built 5 lost
Favourite	1942	783t		1875 hp 14kn	1x3in 2x20mm	23 built 1 lost
Bustler	1942	1118t		3200 hp 16kn	1x3in 1x2pdr 2x20mm 4xMG	8 built 1 lost
Envoy	1944	868t		1700hp 12kn	1x3in 2x20mm 2xMG	6 built no losses

Harbour tugs of the Second World War
Class	Built	Tonnage (GRT)	Dimensions	Engines	Armament	Notes
Robust	1909	700t		1250 hp 12kn	?	10 in service 1 lost
West	1919	161t		430 hp 10kn	?	6 in service 2 lost
Alligator	1941	395t		1000 hp 12kn	1x12pdr	2 built 1 lost

== Post war ==
The Royal Naval tugs and small auxiliaries were formed by the Royal Maritime Auxiliary Service and crewed by MoD employed civilians. However this was outsourced to a private company Serco-Denholm slightly prior to the year 2000. Initially the vessels were still MoD owned but the crews and manning were privatised. The remaining vessels were later sold to Serco-Denholm changing from the old black and buff colour scheme of the RMAS to black and white. All the vessels now carry the initials SD prior to their name.

== Characteristics ==
Admiralty tugs were built to Navy specifications, and standardized where possible to a single design, though this was based on a civilian type. In this they followed the pattern of other auxiliary vessels, such as the Admiralty trawlers, and the Flower-class corvettes. They were built by shipyards specializing in tug construction, and thus incorporated merchant rather than navy features, such as an enclosed bridge, and wooden superstructure. However, it was specified they be armed and equipped with radio. The First World War vessels had at least one gun, for self-defence, and smoke-generating gear. In World War II they also carried anti-aircraft guns for protection against air attack.

== Construction list ==
One of the builders of these tugs was Henry Robb Ltd. Below is a list of Bustler-class ocean rescue/salvage tugs built during World War II. These were powered by diesel engines.

=== 1941–1942 ===
Built and launched in 1941 to 1942 were:

- HMRT Bustler
- HMRT Samsonia Post-war, Samsonia was leased by Foundation Maritime in Halifax, Nova Scotia, and operated as Foundation Josephine. She is featured prominently in Farley Mowat's book The Serpent's Coil.
- HMRT Growler
- HMRT Hesperia

=== 1944–1945 ===
Built in 1944 and 1945 were:

- HMRT Mediator
- HMRT Reward
- HMRT Turmoil
- HMRT Warden

== See also ==
- The Key (1958 film)
