= SS Titan (1894) =

- A postcard of Titan, before 1930.

History
- Name: 1889–94: TSS Cambria
- Owner: 1889–94: London and North Western Railway
- Operator: 1889–94: London and North Western Railway
- Port of registry: (United Kingdom of Great Britain and Ireland)
- Builder: Cammell Laird
- Yard number: 567
- Launched: 1889
- In service: 1889
- Out of service: 1891
- Fate: Sold to Compagnie Générale Transatlantique

History
- Name: 1894–1957: Titan
- Owner: 1894–1957: Compagnie Générale Transatlantique
- Operator: 1894–1957: Compagnie Générale Transatlantique
- Port of registry: (France)
- In service: 1894
- Out of service: 1957
- Fate: Scrapped 1957

General characteristics
- Type: Tugboat
- Tonnage: 357 GRT
- Length: 145.7 ft (44.4 m)
- Beam: 25.6 ft (7.8 m)
- Draught: 13 ft (4.0 m)
- Speed: 13 knots (24 km/h; 15 mph)

SS Titan was a tugboat and tender operated by the Compagnie Générale Transatlantique from 1894 to 1957. She was originally built as TSS Cambria for the London and North Western Railway in 1889.

== Construction and career ==
She was built by Cammell Laird for the London and North Western Railway in 1889. She was one of the smallest ships operated by the railway and did not serve for very long; less than five years. She was sold to the Compagnie Générale Transatlantique in 1894; a new Cambria was built by the London and North Western Railway in 1897.

She was converted into a tender by the Compagnie Générale Transatlantique in 1894, entering service the same year. At 357 tons she was one of the smallest vessels every run by the company, but was powerful enough to tow larger ships out to sea. She served liners such as La Bourgogne, La Bretagne, La Lorraine, La Provence, France, Rochambeau, Paris, Île de France, Champlain, Normandie, Liberté, Flandre and many smaller ships as well as cargo vessels of the Transat. She was present at the launch of Normandie in 1932, and in 1940 alongside fellow Compagnie Générale Transatlantique tenders Minotaure and Ursus participated in the rescue of the incomplete battleship Jean Bart. The tug served in both World Wars, returning to regular passenger service after both. On 1 October 1957, she departed Le Havre for the last time with honours, towed by the tug Abeille 20 to Saint-Nazaire. Titan was scrapped the same month after a 63-year-career with the Transat and a total of 68 years at sea.
