= E3 Tug Project =

Joint R&D project to create an energy efficient engine for furyure tugboat designs

The E3 Tug Project is a joint R&D project between Smit International, Damen Shipyards Gorinchem and Alewijnse Marine Technology. The goal of the project is to create an energy efficient tugboat engine to be integrated into future tugboat designs. The purpose of which is to alleviate unnecessary ship pollution by studying the operational patterns of harbor tug use. The Port of Rotterdam is spearheading the project with a goal that by the 2020 it will have reduced its air pollution by ten percent.

== Concept ==
The E3 project represents three main design criteria: Efficient in operations, Environmental friendly and Economically viable. Smit International is one of the main tugboat users in the Port of Rotterdam and is supplied by Damen Shipyards Gorinchem.

== Project ==
The project itself is divided into three key stages. The first stage consists studying the highly advanced tug already operating in the port, the Smit Elbe (Damen ASD Tug 2810). The research from the existing tug will provide the necessary data to start of the second stage of the project. The second stage being the design of a new propulsion system for a separate Damen ASD Tug 2810 model tug. This propulsion system must incorporate the latest technology to complete the aforementioned efficiency increases as well as satisfy the three Es. The third stage will be the design of a Damen ASD Tug 2810 of the future using technologies that should be available in about ten years time.

=== First Stage (Testing) ===
The first stage of testing was conducted over a four-week period and in that time 27 tows were performed. The Parameters which were directly affected and measured in this test are:

- Fuel Consumption:
- Engine Power: max output when pulling only represents 1-2% of the total operating time.
- Vessel Speed
- Emissions

Also studied were the five operational modes of normal tugboat operation besides the engines shutoff. Below is the operation data summarized.

- Transit (sailing from and towards a job): 30%
- Assist (connected to a ship on a job): 29%
- Standby coupled (clutch engaged, propeller turning at minimal rev/min): 24%
- Standby uncoupled (clutch disengaged, propeller free to turn): 14%
- Cool down (main engines running in cool down mode): 3%

=== Second Stage (Design) ===
Working in conjunction with students at the Technological University of Delft multiple design options were simulated and tested. The main goals remained the same, to reduce emissions and increase fuel efficiency. The University created a dynamic model on which the user can choose the components of the vessel to best increase efficiency.

=== Third Stage (Future Design) ===
This design is focused on building a tug using technology which may be available today, but for certain factors such as cost, safety, and miniaturization it would not be feasible today. For instance the use of LNG as a power source has been considered, but is still far too costly to be implemented.

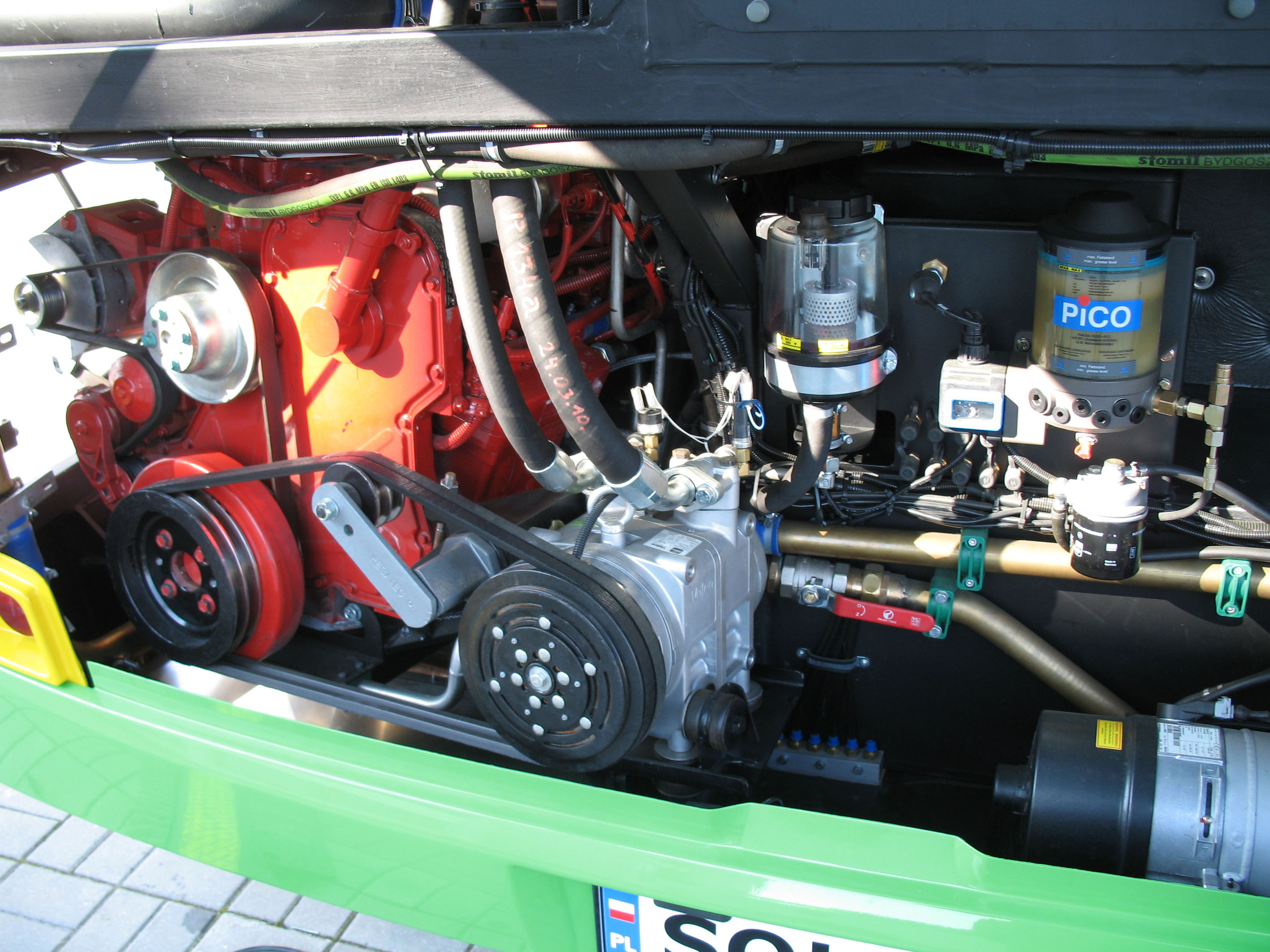
Solbus Solcity 12 LNG - engine used on a transit bus

== Related reading ==
- Hybrid tugboats: tomorrow’s answer to air quality concerns
