= SS Minotaure =

1918 British steamer

- Minotaure docked in front of the SS Normandie, May 1935

History
- Name: HMT Rollcall (1918-1922); SS Romsey (1922-1929); SS Minotaure (1929-1940; 1947-1958); S142 (1940-1944)
- Owner: 1918-22: Royal Navy
- Operator: 1918-22: Royal Navy
- Port of registry: London
- Builder: Ferguson Brothers Ltd, Port Glasgow
- Yard number: 238
- Launched: 2 August 1918
- In service: 1918
- Out of service: 1922
- Fate: Sold to Alexandria Towing Co., Ltd., Southampton

General characteristics
- Type: Salvage tug
- Tonnage: 357 gross register tons (GRT)
- Displacement: 1400 tons as built
- Length: 175 ft (53.3 m)
- Beam: 34.2 ft (10.4 m)
- Depth: 16.4 ft (5.0 m)
- Installed power: 2400 ihp
- Propulsion: Twin screw propellers
- Speed: 13.75 knots
- Notes: Built with two funnels; second removed in 1922/23

SS Minotaure was a tender operated by the Compagnie Générale Transatlantique from 1929 to 1940; and from 1948 to 1958. Built as HMT Rollcall, a salvage tug, for the British Royal Navy in 1918 it was sold into commercial service in 1922.

== Construction and early service ==
She was built by Ferguson Brothers, Ltd. for the Royal Navy in 1918 and launched under the name Rollcall as one of six Resolve class Admiralty salvage tugs built between 1917 and 1919. Rollcall was completed too late to see wartime service and was soon sold off.

In 1922, she was sold to the Alexandria Towing Co. and renamed Romsey. The tug was converted into a passenger tender, and a lounge was built on the upper deck. An enclosed bridge was constructed atop the upper deck and one of the twin funnels was removed. Romsey served in Southampton until 1920, when she was sold to the Compagnie Générale Transatlantique. A similar vessel of the same name replaced her in 1930.

== French Service ==
In 1929 she was acquired by the French Line and based in Le Havre as a tender, under the name Minotaure. She joined the tenders Titan and Ursus, both of which Minotaure joined in assisting the launch of the Normandie in October 1932. In August of the same year the then Prime Minister, Édouard Herriot traveled aboard her, for which a grand piano was loaded aboard the tug.

The largest tug belonging to the French Line, Minotaure often served the company's larger liners. In 1935, the tug traveled to Saint-Nazaire to escort the completed superliner Normandie back to Havre for the liner's maiden voyage. Albert Lebrun, president of France at the time sailed aboard the tug to inspect the brand-new Normandie in May of the same year. Minotaure participated in the rescue of several liners; including L'Atlantique in 1933 and Paris in 1939, both victims of the fires that so often ravaged French liners.

Requisitioned by the French Navy at the start of the Second World War, the tender carried more than 500 troops when she departed Le Havre to assist the evacuation of the battleship Jean-Bart from the fitting out dock on 11 June 1940. Joined by Titan and Ursus, the three tugs towed the incomplete battleship out of Saint-Nazaire on the night of the 18 June. Minotaure departed St. Nazaire on the 19 for Bordeaux; arriving there on the 24 June. Two months later she was seized by the Germans.

== Wartime service ==
Renamed S142; she was used as a Channel Islands ferry under the German flag. Based in Saint-Malo, her main purpose was to convey supplies to and from the Channel Islands.

In June 1944, while under the German flag, she was torpedoed by a Royal Navy motor torpedo boat. The front of the vessel was completely torn off, and with the loss of more than a hundred lives S142 was beached near Saint-Malo.

== Postwar ==
After the end of WWII, her fellow tender Titan was discovered unscathed, and in August 1945 was brought to the refloated wreck to tow her back to Havre. After being repaired, S-142 was renamed Minotaure once again, and returned to service in February 1948. Titan was sold for demolition in October 1957, and several newer tugs were constructed during the 1950s for the French Line; thus the aging Minotaure was retired and sold for scrapping on 7 January 1958. The vessel was scrapped in Belgium in March of the same year.
