= Tugboat =

Boat that maneuvers other vessels by pushing or towing them

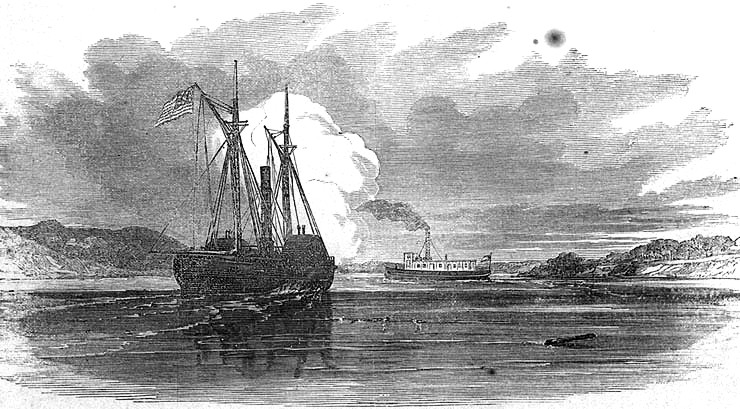
Tugboat CSS Teaser is captured by USS Maratanza.

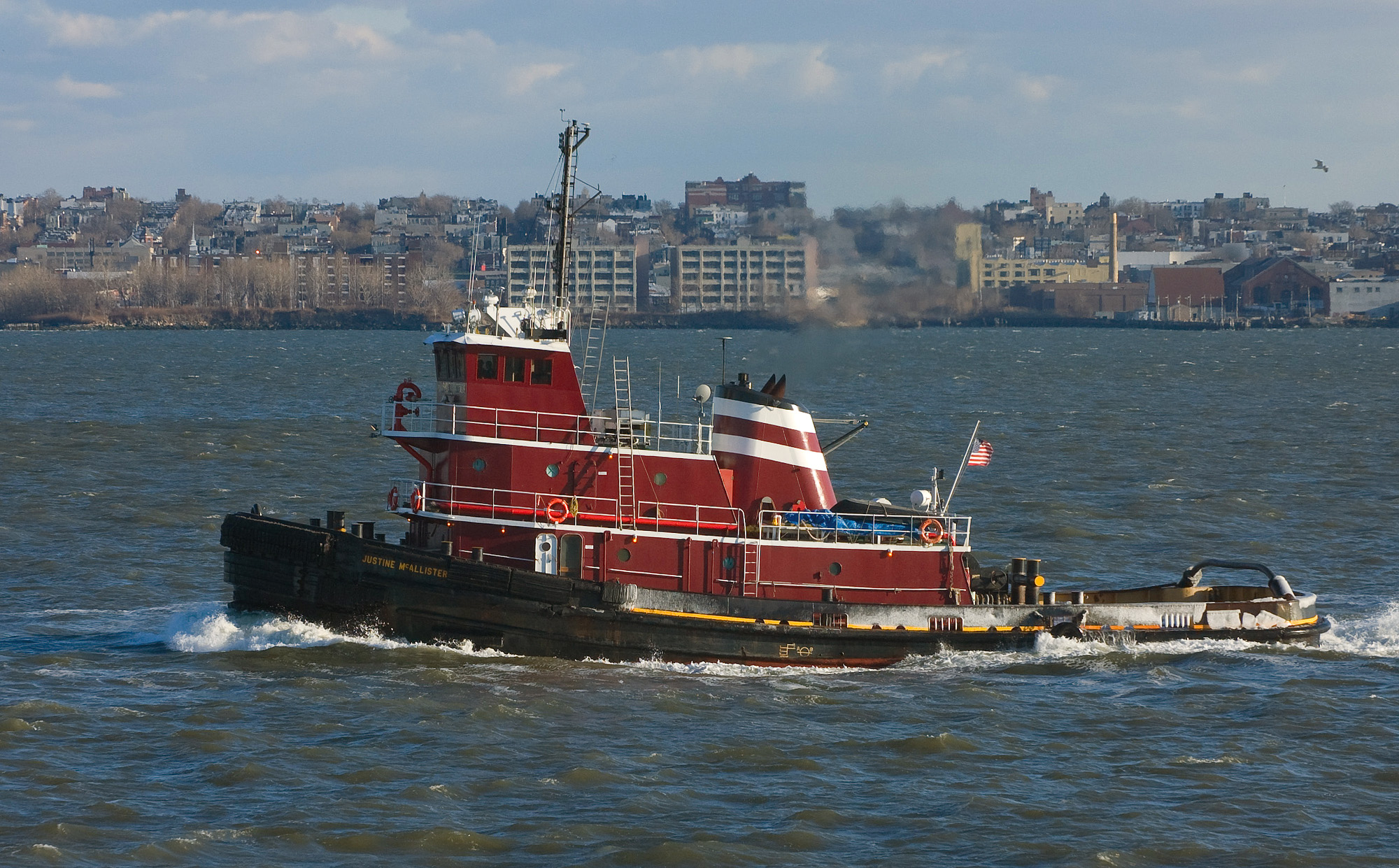
Justine McAllister, a tug boat in New York Harbor, January 2008

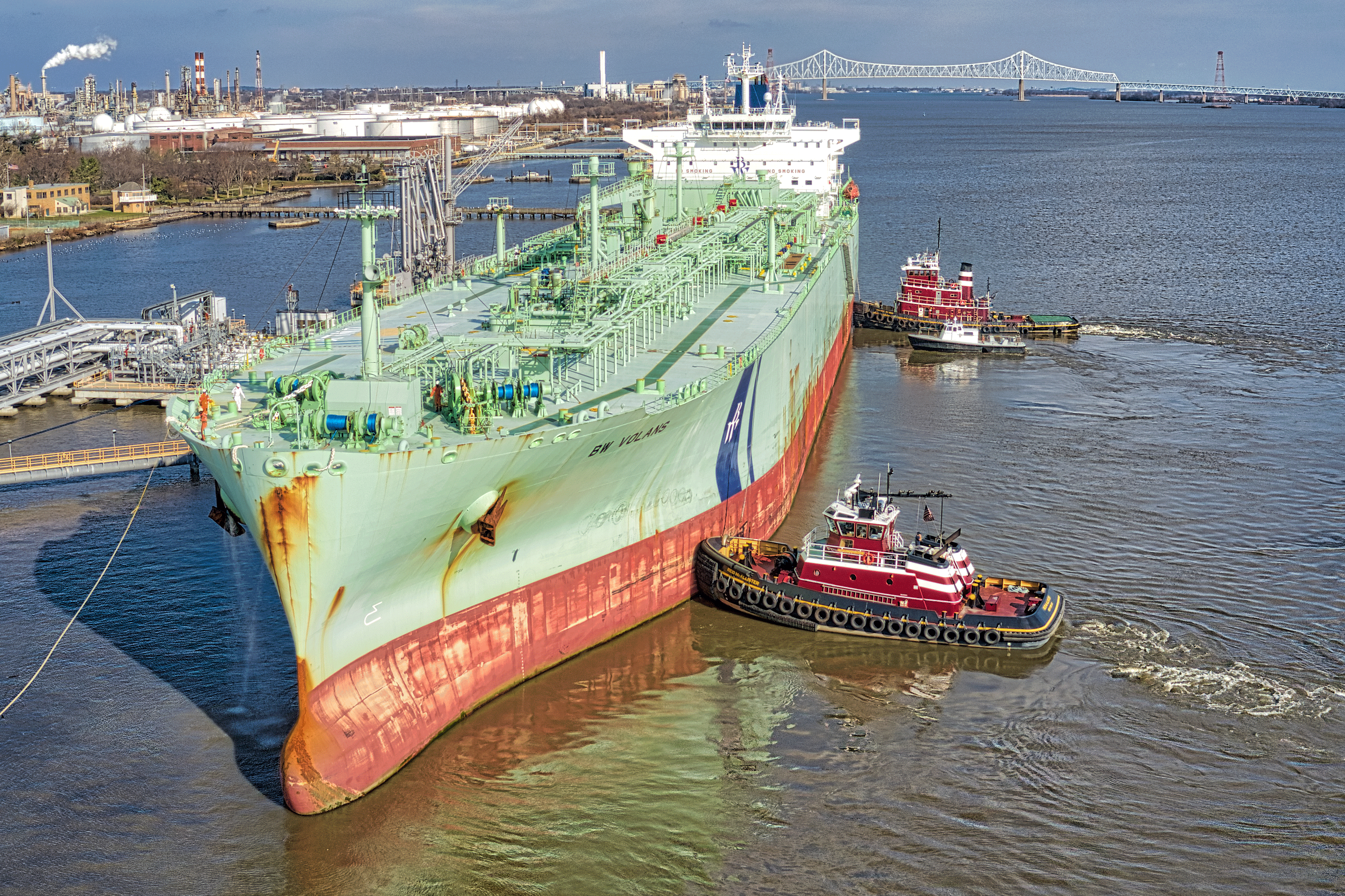
The tugboats Reid McAllister and McAllister Responder push the LPG tanker BW Volans into port at Marcus Hook on the Delaware River.

A tugboat or tug is a marine vessel that manoeuvres other vessels by pushing or pulling them, with direct contact or a tow line. These boats typically tug ships in circumstances where they cannot or should not move under their own power, such as in crowded harbors or narrow canals, or cannot move at all, such as barges, disabled ships, log rafts, or oil platforms. Some are ocean-going, and some are icebreakers or salvage tugs. Early models were powered by steam engines, which were later superseded by diesel engines. Many have deluge gun water jets, which help in firefighting, especially in harbours.

== Types ==
=== Seagoing ===
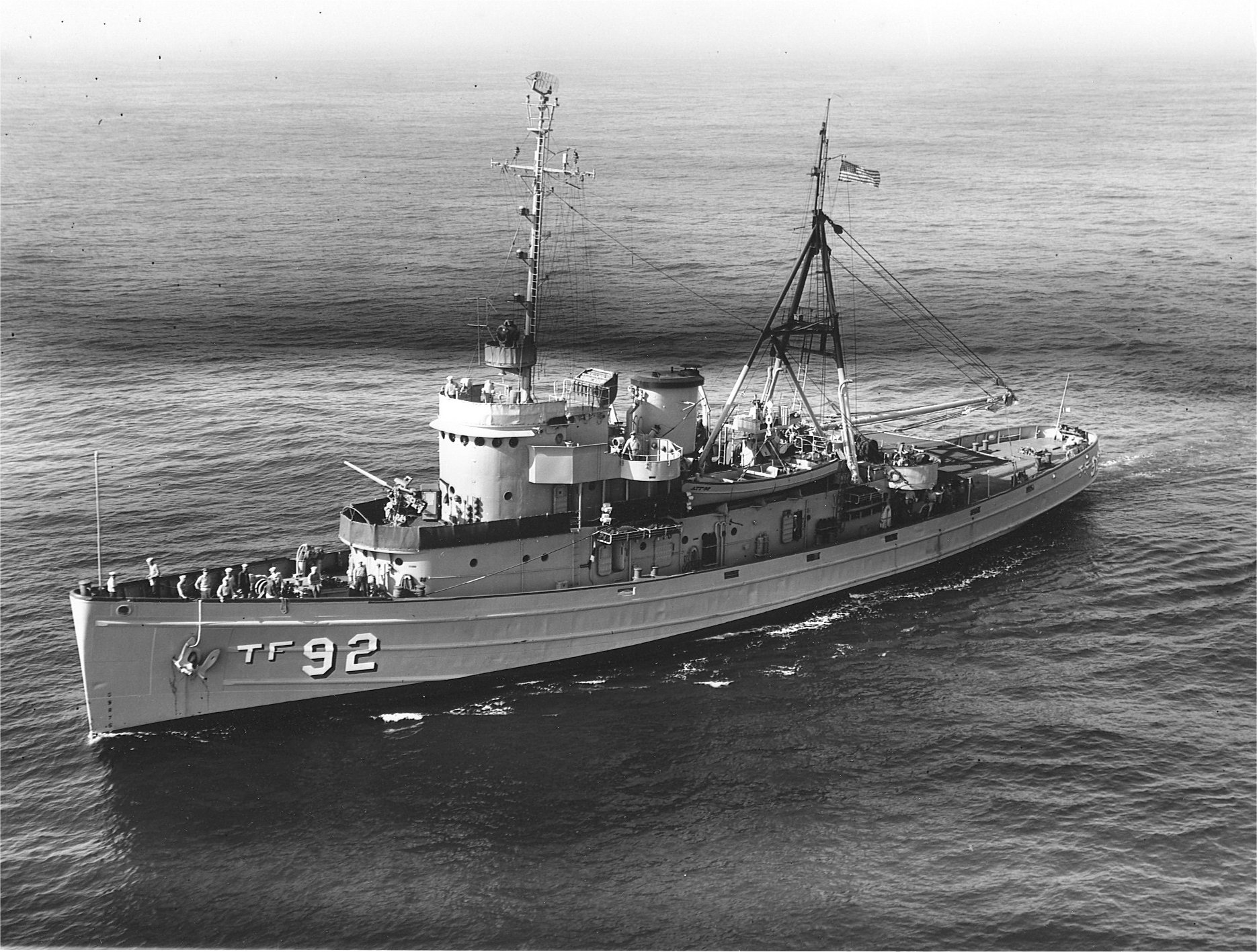
Fleet tug USS Tawasa (1,255 tons, 205 ft), which towed a nuclear depth charge as it was detonated in Operation Wigwam in 1955

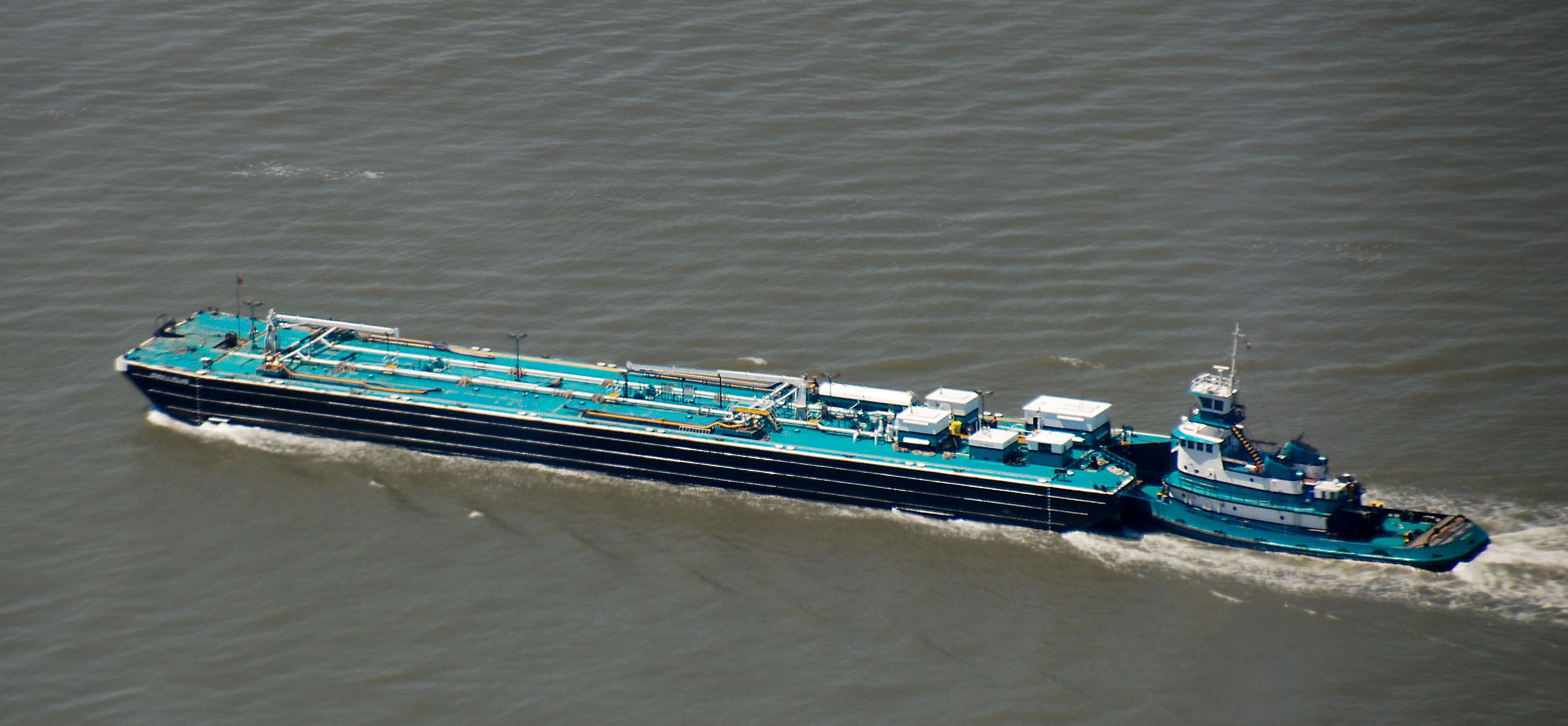
Articulated tug and barge (ATB)

Seagoing tugs (deep-sea tugs or ocean tugboats) fall into four basic categories:

1. The standard seagoing tug with model bow that tows almost exclusively by way of a wire cable. In some rare cases, such as some USN fleet tugs, a synthetic rope hawser may be used for the tow in the belief that the line can be pulled aboard a disabled ship by the crew owing to its lightness compared to wire cable.
2. The "notch tug" can be secured by way of cables, or more commonly in recent times, synthetic lines that run from the stern of the tug to the stern of the barge. This configuration is generally used in inland waters where sea and swell are minimal because of the danger of parting the push wires. Often, this configuration is employed even without a "notch" on the barge, but in those cases it is preferable to have "push knees" on the tug to stabilize its position. Model bow tugs employing this method of pushing nearly always have a towing winch that can be used if sea conditions render pushing inadvisable. With this configuration, the barge being pushed might approach the size of a small ship, with the interaction of the water flow allowing a higher speed with a minimal increase in power required or fuel consumption.
3. The "integral unit", or "integrated tug and barge" (ITB), comprises specially designed vessels that lock together in such a rigid and strong method as to be certified as such by authorities (classification societies) such as the American Bureau of Shipping, Lloyd's Register of Shipping, Indian Register of Shipping, Det Norske Veritas or several others. These units stay combined under virtually any sea conditions and the tugs usually have poor sea-keeping designs for navigation without their barges attached. Vessels in this category are legally considered to be ships rather than tugboats and barges must be staffed accordingly. These vessels must show navigation lights compliant with those required of ships rather than those required of tugboats and vessels undertow.
4. "Articulated tug and barge" (ATB) units also utilize mechanical means to connect to their barges. The tug slips into a notch in the stern and is attached by a hinged connection, becoming an articulated vehicle. ATBs generally utilize Intercon and Bludworth connecting systems. ATBs are generally staffed as a large tugboat, with between seven and nine crew members. The typical American ATB displays navigational lights of a towing vessel pushing ahead, as described in the 1972 ColRegs. As of 2017, there are 165 US-flagged ATBs, 85 percent of which are classified as tank barges and the remaining 15 percent are classified as bulk cargo or ro-ro barges.

=== Harbour ===
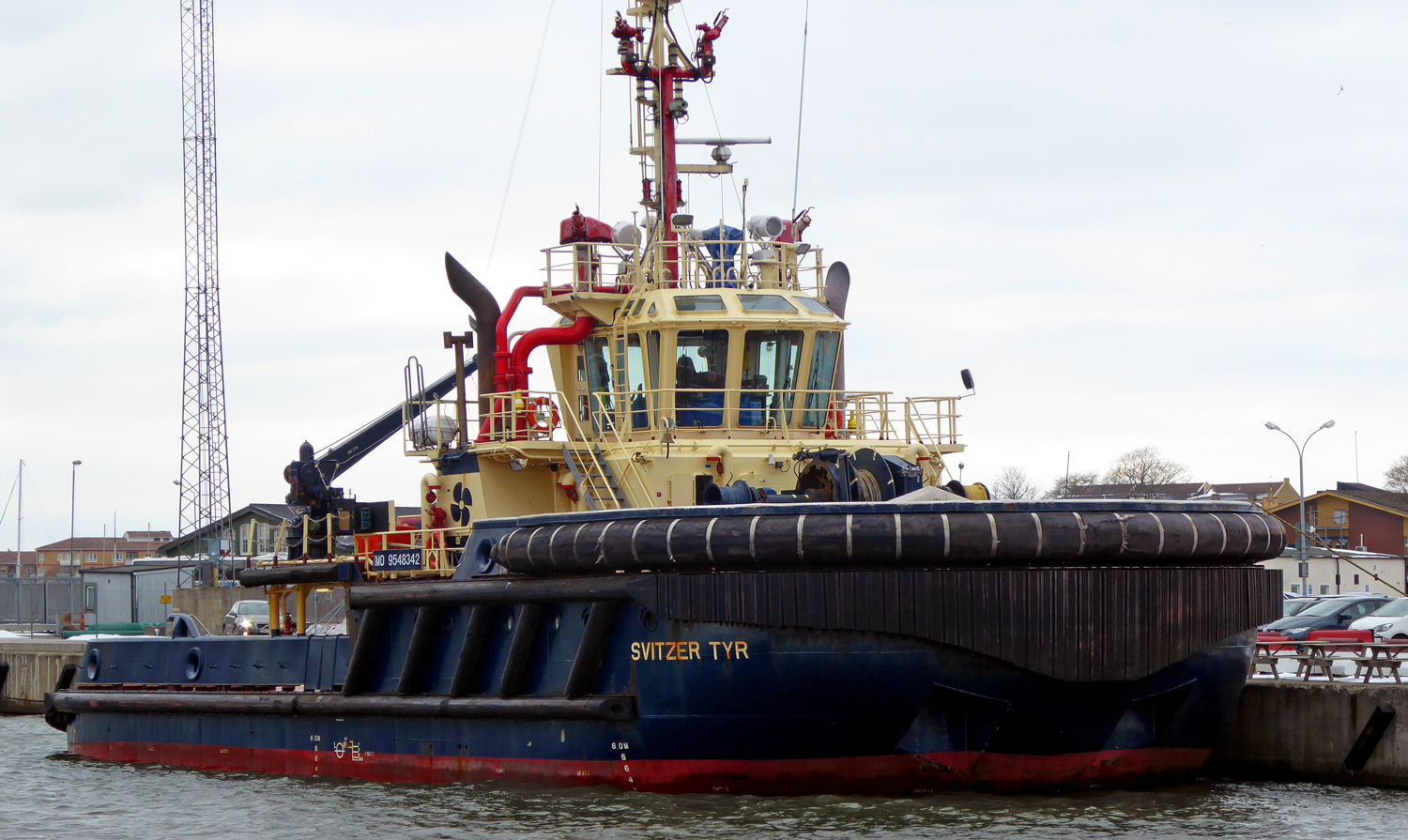
Svitzer Tyr, a Danish tugboat, built in China in 2011, pictured in 2018 in Ystad harbour

Compared with seagoing tugboats, harbour tugboats that are employed exclusively as ship assist vessels are generally smaller and their width-to-length ratio is often higher, due to the need for the tugs' wheelhouse to avoid contact with the hull of a ship, which may have a pronounced rake at the bow and stern. In some ports there is a requirement for certain numbers and sizes of tugboats for port operations with gas tankers. Also, in many ports, tankers are required to have tug escorts when transiting in harbors to render assistance in the event of mechanical failure. The port generally mandates a minimum horsepower or bollard pull, determined by the size of the escorted vessel. Most ports will have a number of tugs that are used for other purposes than ship assist, such as dredging operations, bunkering ships, transferring liquid products between berths, and cargo ops. These tugs may also be used for ship assist as needed. Modern ship assist tugs are "omni directional tugs" that employ propellers that can rotate 360 degrees without a rudder, like azimuthal stern drives (ASD), azimuthal tractor drives (ATD), Rotor tugs (RT) or cycloidal drives (VSP; as described below).

=== River ===
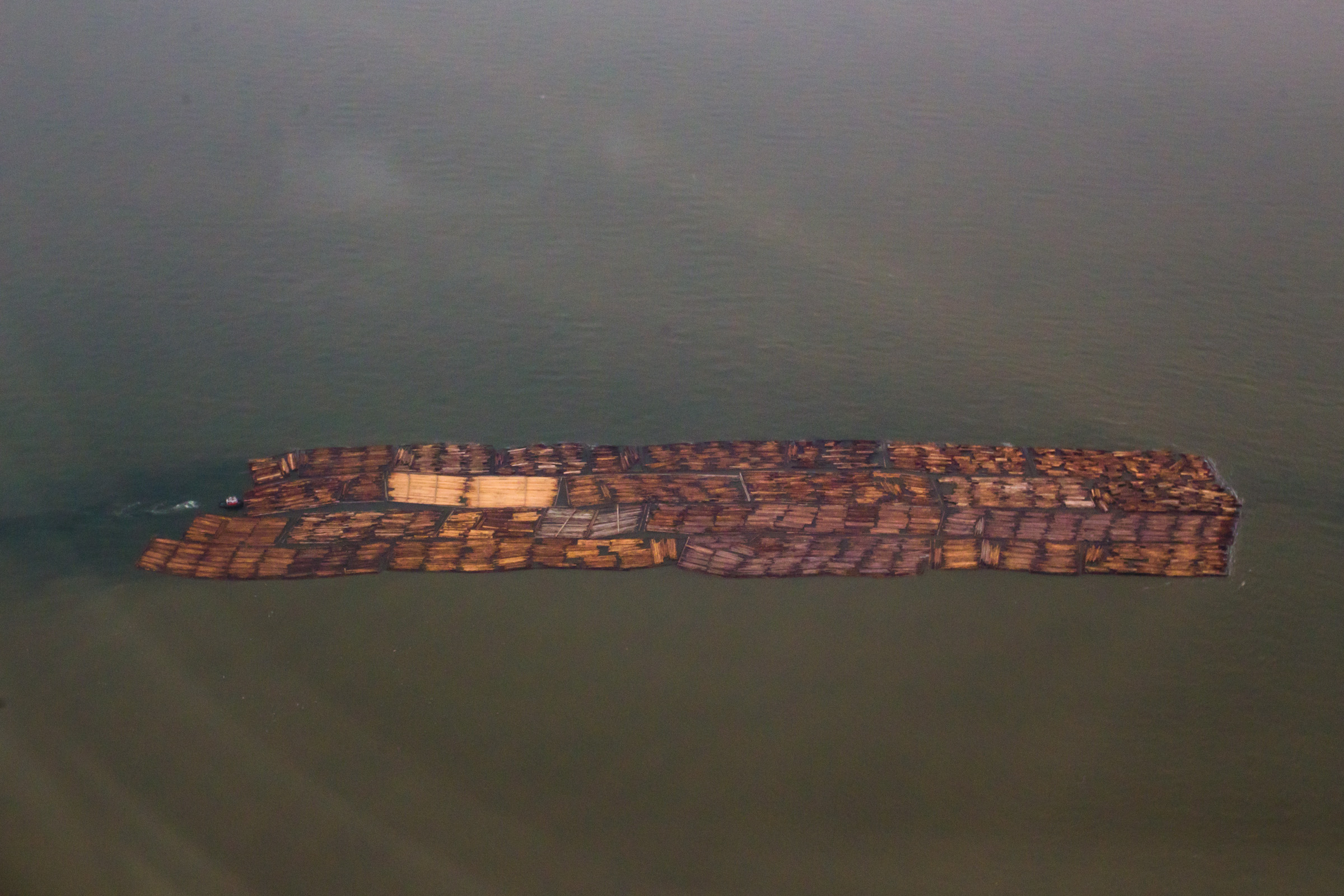
River tug pushing a log raft in British Columbia near Vancouver (May 2012)

River tugs are also referred to as towboats or pushboats. Their hull designs would make open ocean operations dangerous. River tugs usually do not have any significant hawser or winch. Their hulls feature a flat front or bow to line up with the rectangular stern of the barge, often with large pushing knees.

== Propulsion ==
A tugboat on the Arakawa River in Tokyo, Japan

The first tugboat, Charlotte Dundas, was built by William Symington in 1801. It had a steam engine and paddle wheels and was used on rivers in Scotland. Paddle tugs proliferated thereafter and were a common sight for a century. In the 1870s schooner hulls were converted to screw tugs. Compound steam engines and scotch boilers provided 300 Indicated Horse Power. Steam tugs were put to use in every harbour of the world towing and ship berthing. However the word 'tug' was not applied to such boats until 1817 when John Wood launched "TUG" at Port Glasgow, Scotland.

Tugboat diesel engines typically produce 500 to 2,500 kW (~ 680 to 3,400 hp), but larger boats (used in deep waters) can have power ratings up to 20,000 kW (~ 27,200 hp). Tugboats usually have an extreme power:tonnage-ratio; normal cargo and passenger ships have a P:T-ratio (in kW:GRT) of 0.35 to 1.20, whereas large tugs typically are 2.20 to 4.50 and small harbour-tugs 4.0 to 9.5. The engines are often the same as those used in railroad locomotives, but typically drive the propeller mechanically instead of converting the engine output to power electric motors, as is common for diesel-electric locomotives. For safety, tugboat engines often feature two of each critical part for redundancy. Some tugboats operate mainly on battery power.

A tugboat is typically rated by its engine's power output and its overall bollard pull. The largest commercial harbour tugboats in the 2000s–2010s, used for towing container ships or similar, had around 60 to 65 short tons-force (530–580 kN) of bollard pull, which is described as 15 short tons-force (130 kN) above "normal" tugboats.

Diagram of components

Tugboats are highly manoeuvrable, and various propulsion systems have been developed to increase manoeuvrability and increase safety. The earliest tugs were fitted with paddle wheels, but these were soon replaced by propeller-driven tugs. Kort nozzles (see below) have been added to increase thrust-to-power ratio. This was followed by the nozzle-rudder, which omitted the need for a conventional rudder. The cycloidal propeller (see below) was developed prior to World War II and was occasionally used in tugs because of its maneuverability. After World War II it was also linked to safety due to the development of the Voith Water Tractor, a tugboat configuration that could not be pulled over by its tow. In the late 1950s, the Z-drive or (azimuth thruster) was developed. Although sometimes referred to as the Aquamaster or Schottel system, many brands exist: Steerprop, Wärtsilä, Berg Propulsion, etc. These propulsion systems are used on tugboats designed for tasks such as ship docking and marine construction. Conventional propeller/rudder configurations are more efficient for port-to-port towing.

=== Kort nozzle ===
The Kort nozzle is a sturdy cylindrical structure around a special propeller having minimum clearance between the propeller blades and the inner wall of the Kort nozzle. The thrust-to-power ratio is enhanced because the water approaches the propeller in a linear configuration and exits the nozzle the same way. The Kort nozzle is named after its inventor, but many brands exist.

=== Cyclorotor ===
The cycloidal propeller is a circular plate mounted on the underside of the hull, rotating around a vertical axis with a circular array of vertical blades (in the shape of hydrofoils) that protrude out of the bottom of the ship. Each blade can rotate itself around a vertical axis. The internal mechanism changes the angle of attack of the blades in sync with the rotation of the plate, so that each blade can provide thrust in any direction, similar to the collective pitch control and cyclic in a helicopter.

== Fenders ==
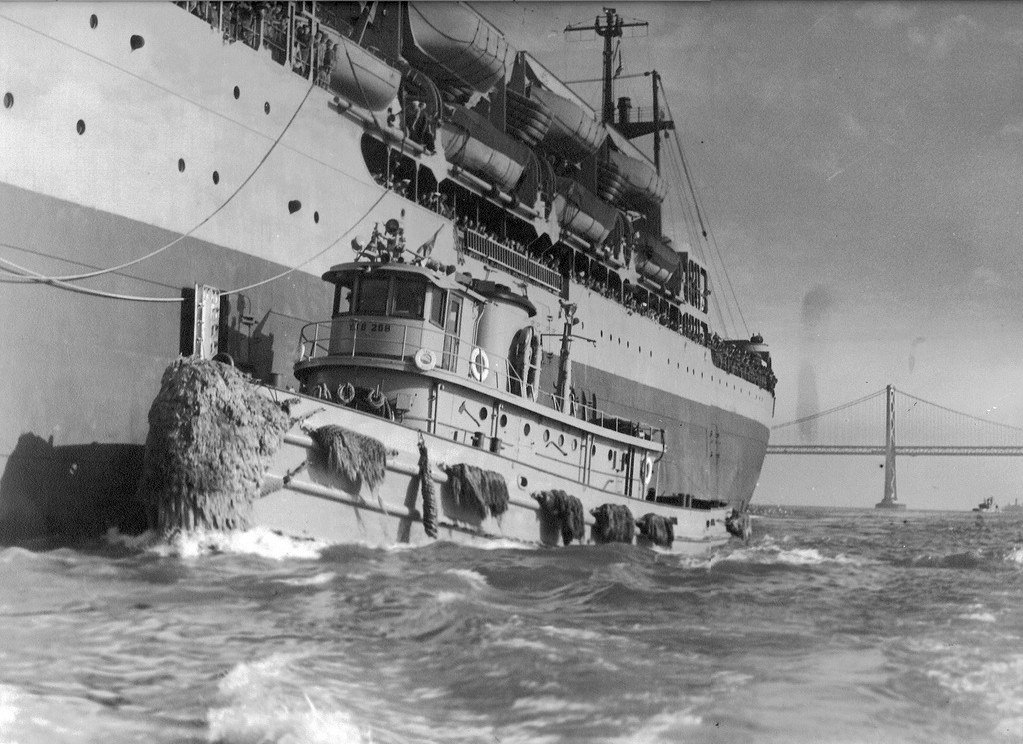
Red Cloud (foreground), a type V2-ME-A1 tug, alongside USNS David C. Shanks, outside the Oakland Bay Bridge in San Francisco Bay, California, 1950s. On the bow is a traditional rope tugboat fender.

Tugboat fenders are made of high-abrasion-resistance rubber with good resilience properties. They are very popular with small port craft owners and tug owners. These fenders are generally made from cut pieces of vehicle tires strung together, but on the sides of the tug, large heavy equipment tires are often used directly, hung down from the gunwale. Some fendering is compression moulded in high-pressure thermic-fluid-heated moulds and have excellent seawater resistance, but are not widely used due to the cost. Tugboat bow fenders are also called beards or bow puds. In the past they were made of rope for padding to protect the bow, but rope fendering is almost never seen in recent times. Other types of tugboat fender include Tug cylindrical fender, W fender, M fender, D fender, and others.

== Carousel ==
A recent Dutch innovation is the carousel tug, winner of the Maritime Innovation Award at the Dutch Maritime Innovation Awards Gala in 2006. It adds a pair of interlocking rings to the body of the tug, the inner on the boat, the outer on the ship by winch or towing hook. Since the towing point rotates freely, the tug is very difficult to capsize.

== Races ==
Vintage tugboat races have been held annually in Olympia, Washington, since 1974 during the Olympia Harbor Days Maritime Festival Tugboat races are held annually on Elliott Bay in Seattle, on the Hudson River at the New York Tugboat Race, the Detroit River, and the Great Tugboat Race and Parade on the St. Mary's River.

== Ballet ==
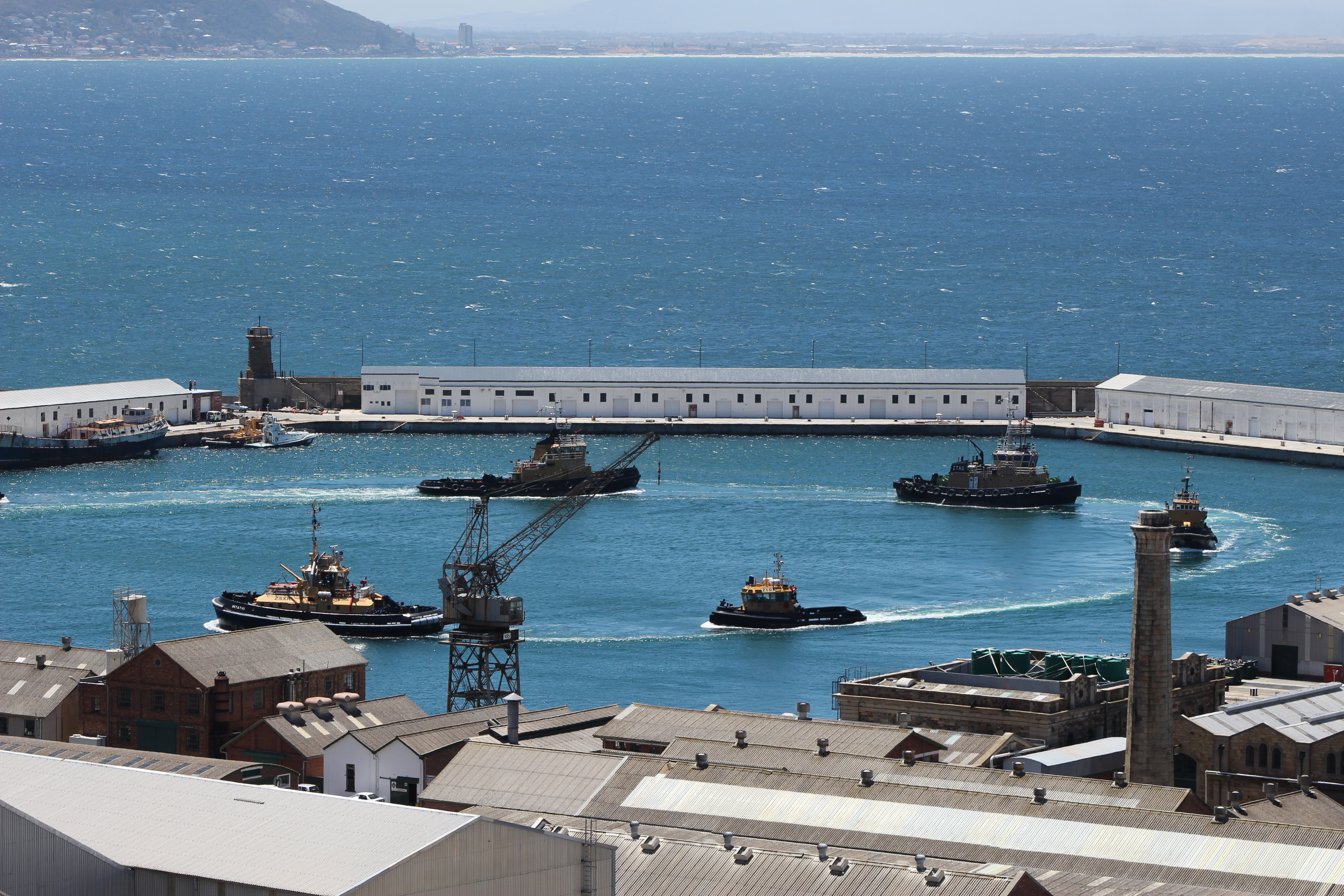
South African Naval tugs perform a "ballet" when welcoming a new member of the fleet.

Since 1980, an annual tugboat ballet has been held in Hamburg harbour on the occasion of the festival commemorating the anniversary of the establishment of a port in Hamburg. On a weekend in May, eight tugboats perform choreographed movements for about an hour to the tunes of waltz and other sorts of dance music.

== Roundups ==
The Tugboat Roundup is a gathering of tugboats and other vessels in celebration of maritime industry. The Waterford Tugboat Roundup is held in the late summer at the confluence of the Hudson and Mohawk Rivers in Waterford, New York. The tugs featured are river tugs and other tugs re-purposed to serve on the New York State Canal System.

== In popular culture ==
Tugboat Annie was the subject of a series of Saturday Evening Post magazine stories featuring the female captain of the tugboat Narcissus in Puget Sound, later featured in the films Tugboat Annie (1933), Tugboat Annie Sails Again (1940) and Captain Tugboat Annie (1945). The Canadian television series The Adventures of Tugboat Annie was filmed in 1957.

=== Film and television ===
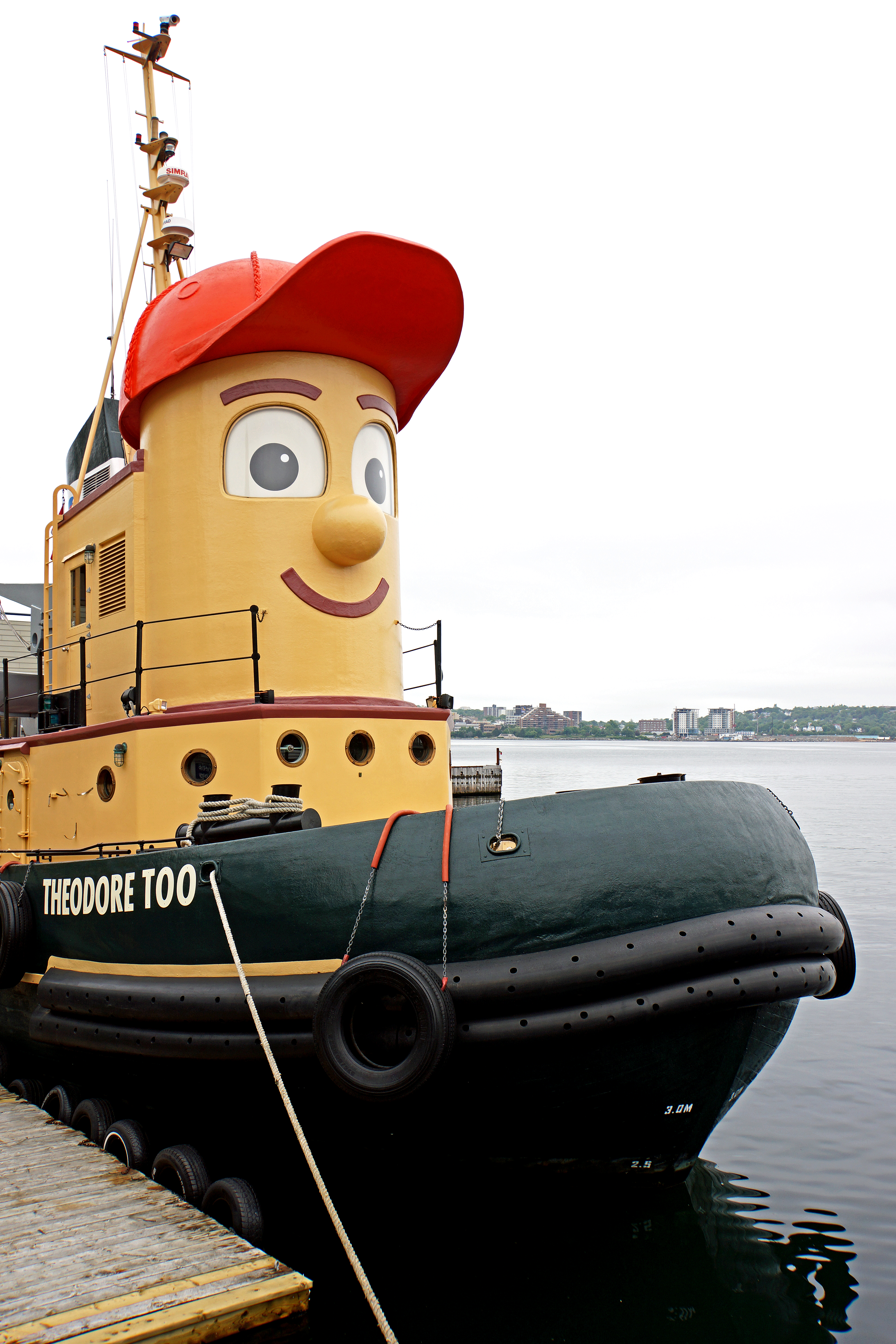
Theodore Tugboat, the titular hero of a children's show, was popular enough that a fullsize replica was constructed.

To date, there have been four children's shows revolving around anthropomorphic tugboats.

- In the late 1980s, 13 episodes were made of TUGS, a series depicting the life of tugboats in the 1920s.
- An American adaptation using edited footage from Tugs followed: Salty's Lighthouse.
- In the 1975's Soviet short animation musical film В порту/ In the sea port a tugboat sang a song: "Through a harbour area"
- One of the creators of Tugs went on to direct Theodore Tugboat.
- Animated preschool series Toot the Tiny Tugboat started broadcasting on Channel 5 Milkshake! in 2014 and on Cartoonito in 2015, with a Welsh-language version airing on S4C Cyw.

"Tugger" is a tugboat in the animated series South Park. He appears in the episode "The New Terrance and Phillip Movie Trailer" as a sidekick for Russell Crowe in a fictitious television series entitled Fightin' Round The World with Russell Crowe. Tugger follows Crowe as he engages various people in physical conflicts, providing emotional support and comic relief. At one point Tugger even attempts to commit suicide, upon being forced to hear Russell Crowe's new musical composition.

=== Literature ===
(Alphabetical by author)

- The children's book Scuffy the Tugboat, written by Gertrude Crampton and illustrated by Tibor Gergely and first published in 1946 as part of the Little Golden Books series, follows the adventures of a young toy tugboat who seeks a life beyond the confines of a tub inside his owner's toy store.
- The Dutch writer Jan de Hartog wrote numerous nautical novels, first in Dutch, then in English.
  - The novel Hollands Glorie, written prior to World War II, was made into a Dutch miniseries in 1978 and concerned the dangers faced by the crews of Dutch salvage tugs.
  - The novella Stella, concerning the dangers faced by the captains of rescue tugs in the English Channel during World War II, was made into a film entitled The Key in 1958.
  - The novel The Captain (1967), about the captain of a rescue tug during a Murmansk Convoy, sold over a million copies.
  - Its 1986 sequel, The Commodore, features the narrator captaining a fleet of tugs in peace-time.
- Little Toot (1939), written and illustrated by Hardie Gramatky, is a children's story of an anthropomorphic tugboat child, who wants to help tow ships in a harbour near Hoboken. He's rejected by the tugboat community and dejectedly drifts out to sea, where he accidentally discovers a shipwrecked liner and a chance to prove his worth. This story was animated as part of the Disney movie Melody Time.
- Farley Mowat's book The Grey Seas Under tells the tale of a legendary North Atlantic salvage tug, the Foundation Franklin. He later wrote The Serpent's Coil, which also deals with salvage tugs in the North Atlantic.

== Gallery ==
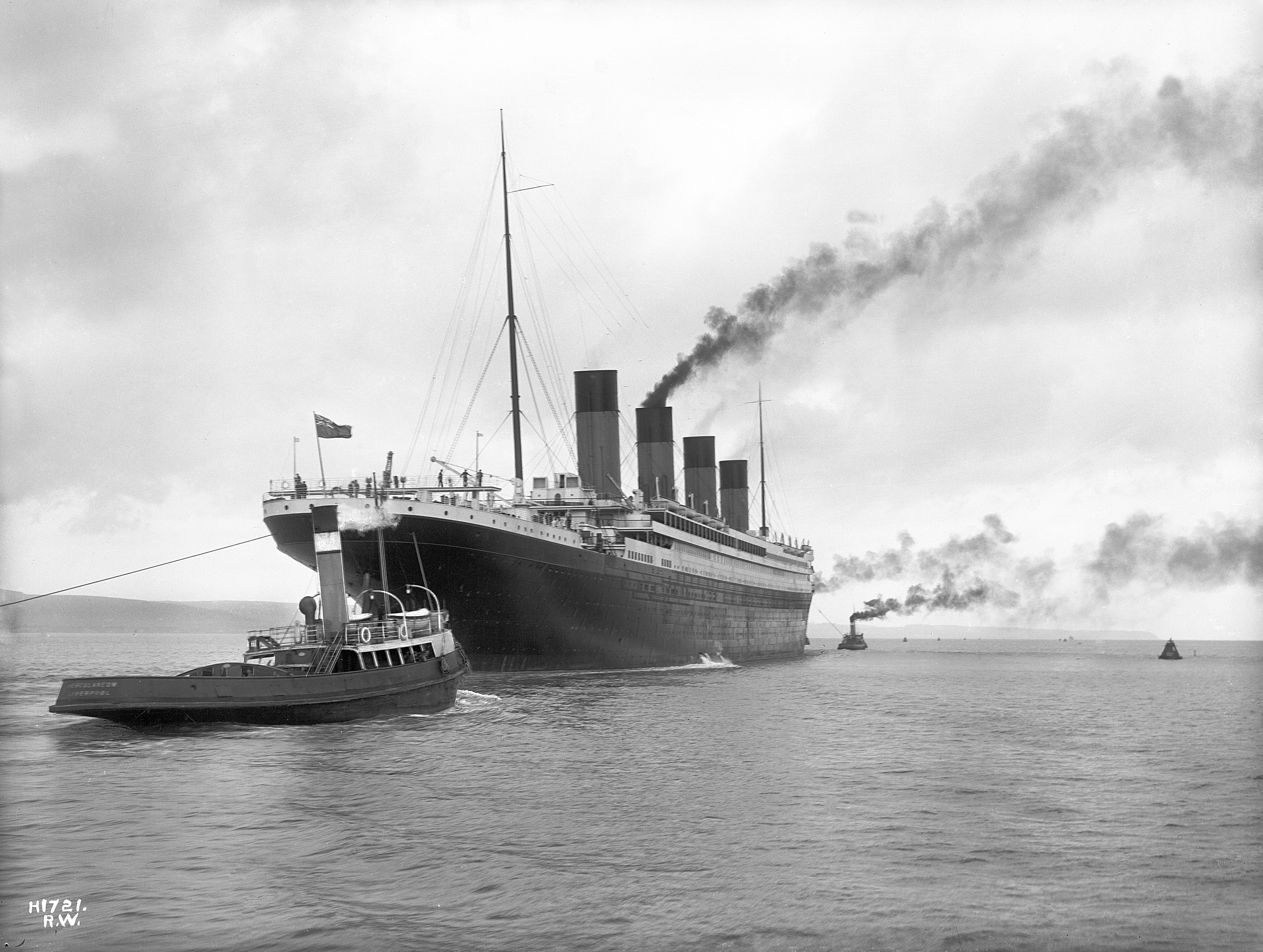
Titanic with tugboats, doing sea trials in 1912

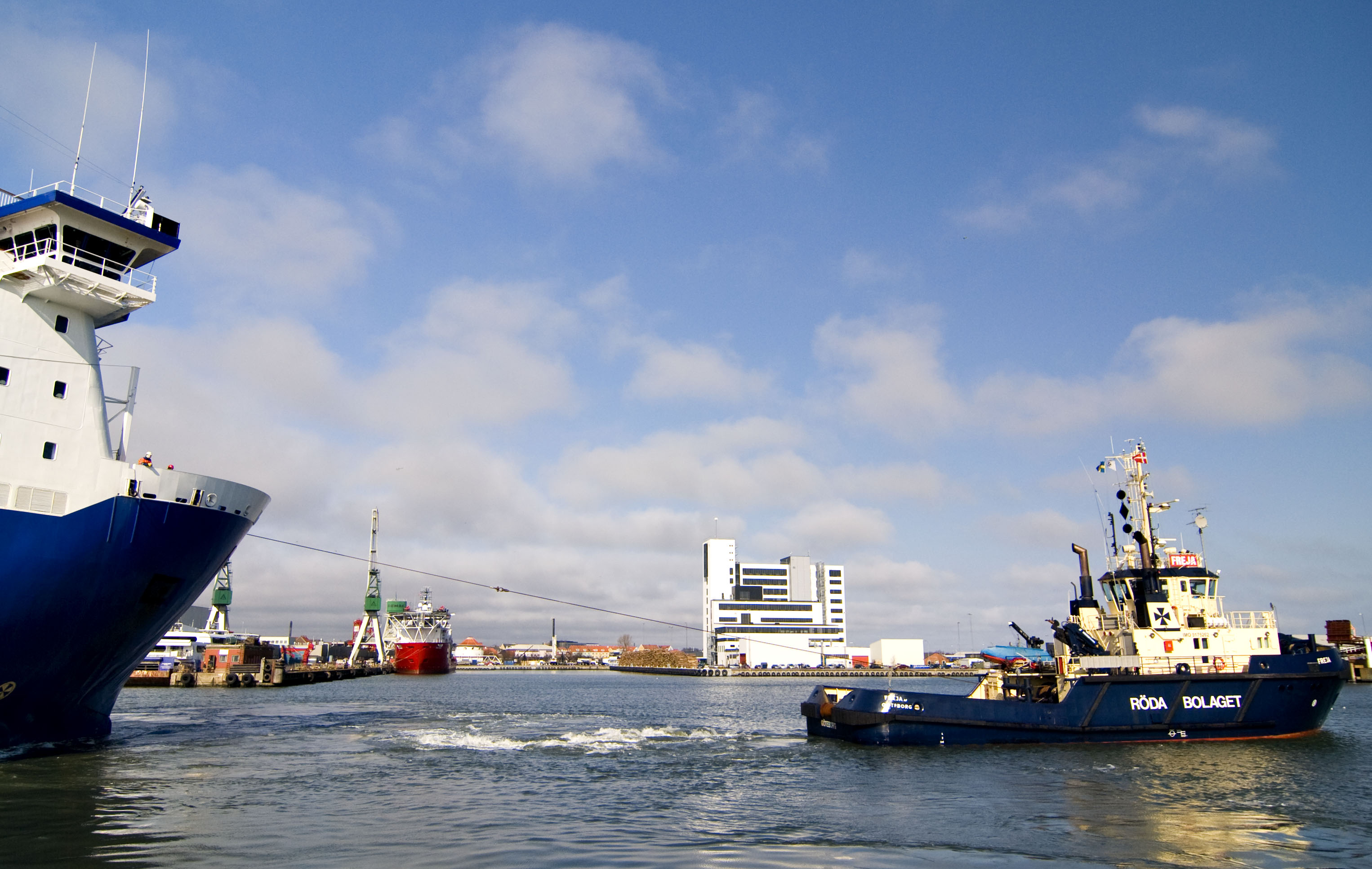
Swedish harbour tug Svitzer Freja in tug-operation (3,600 kW / 453 gross register tons (GRT))

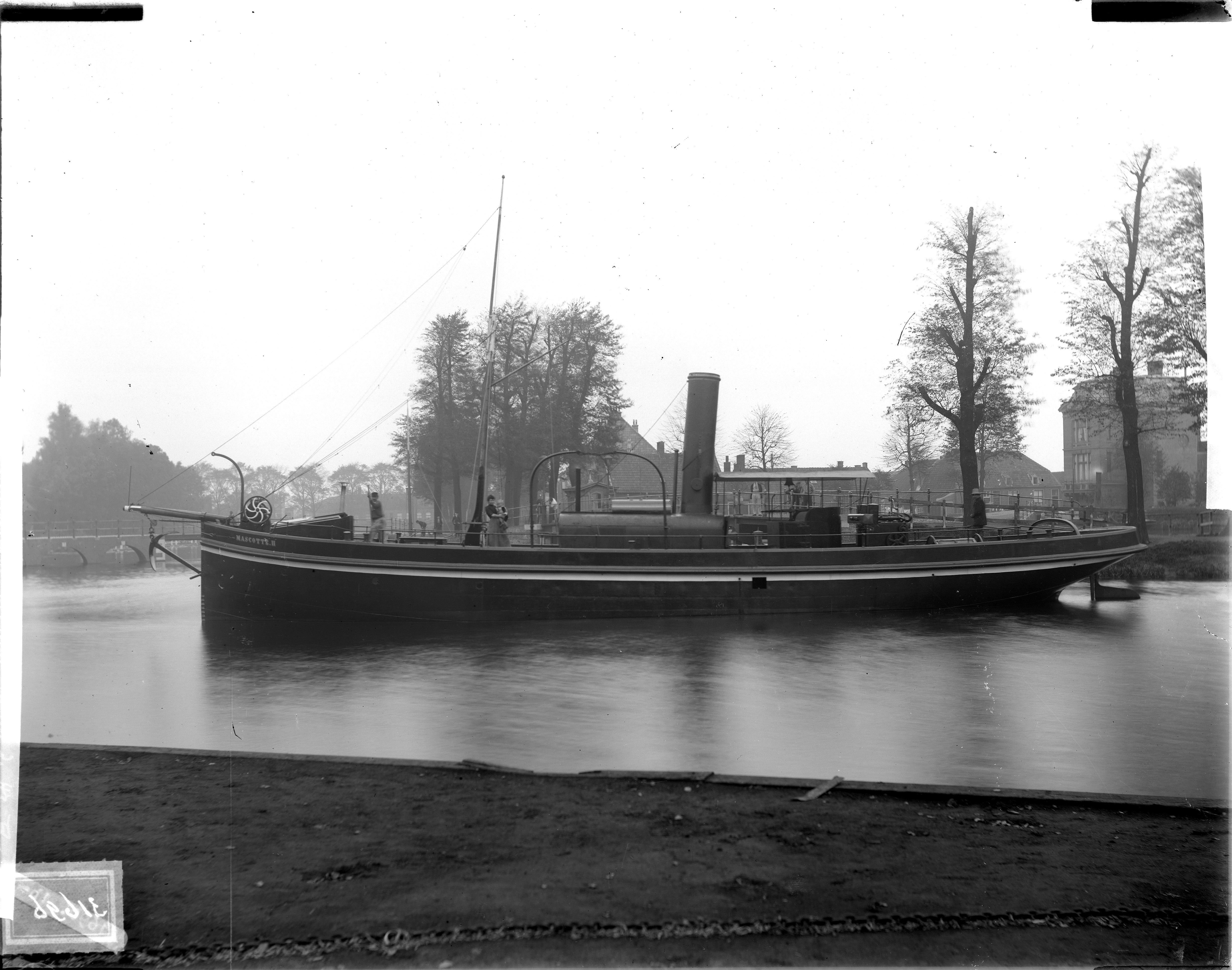
Dutch river tugboat "Mascotte II"

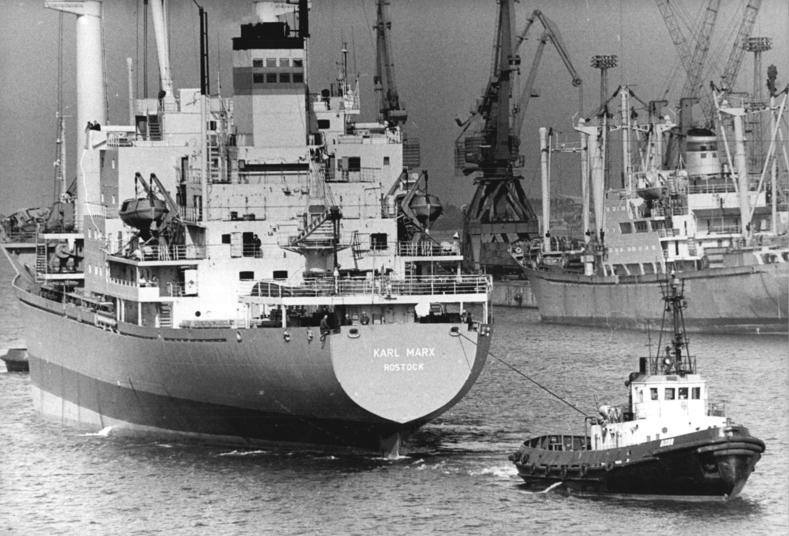
German harbour-tug and DDR quick-freighter Karl Marx at Rostock harbour

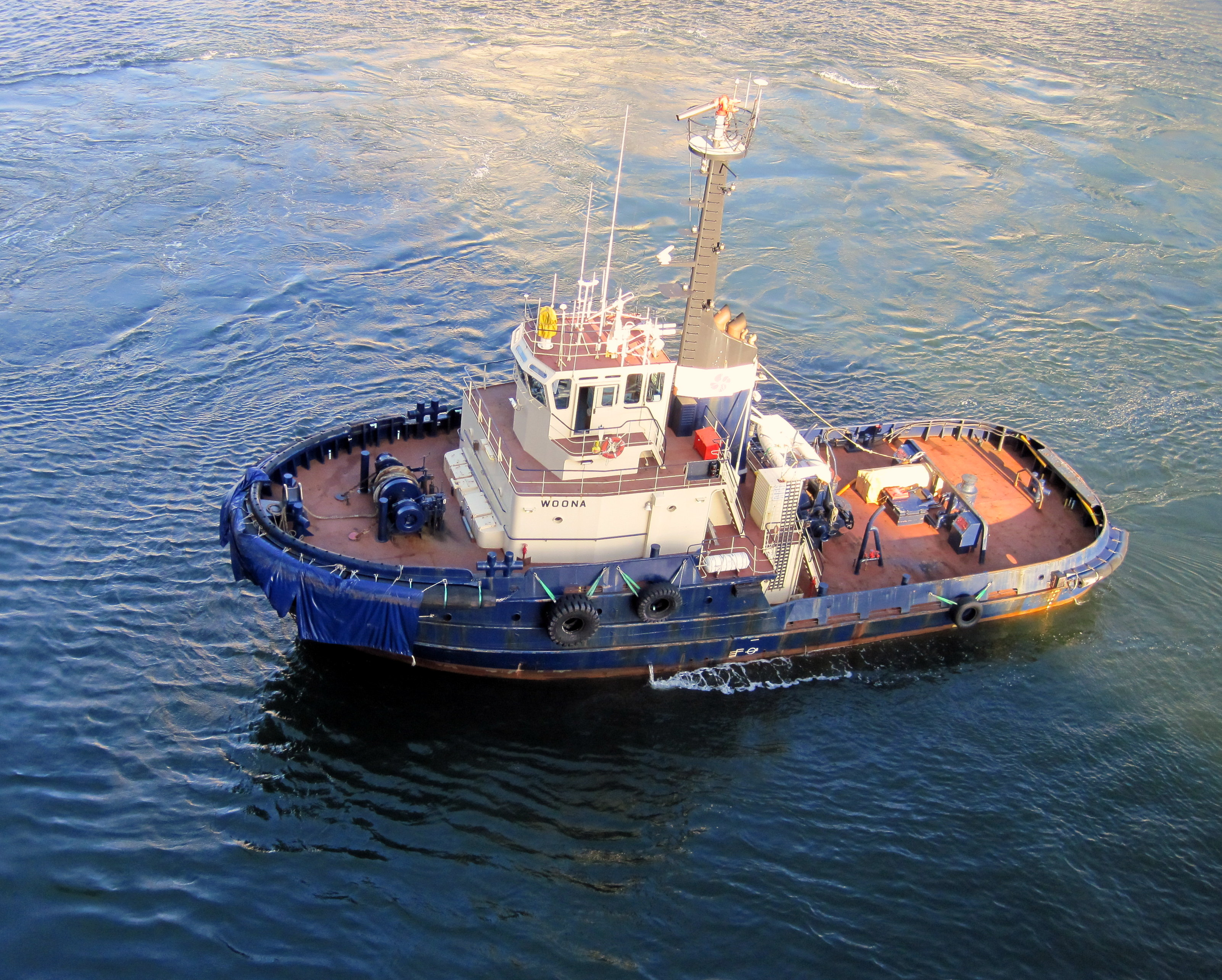
The tugboat Woona in Sydney Harbour, Australia

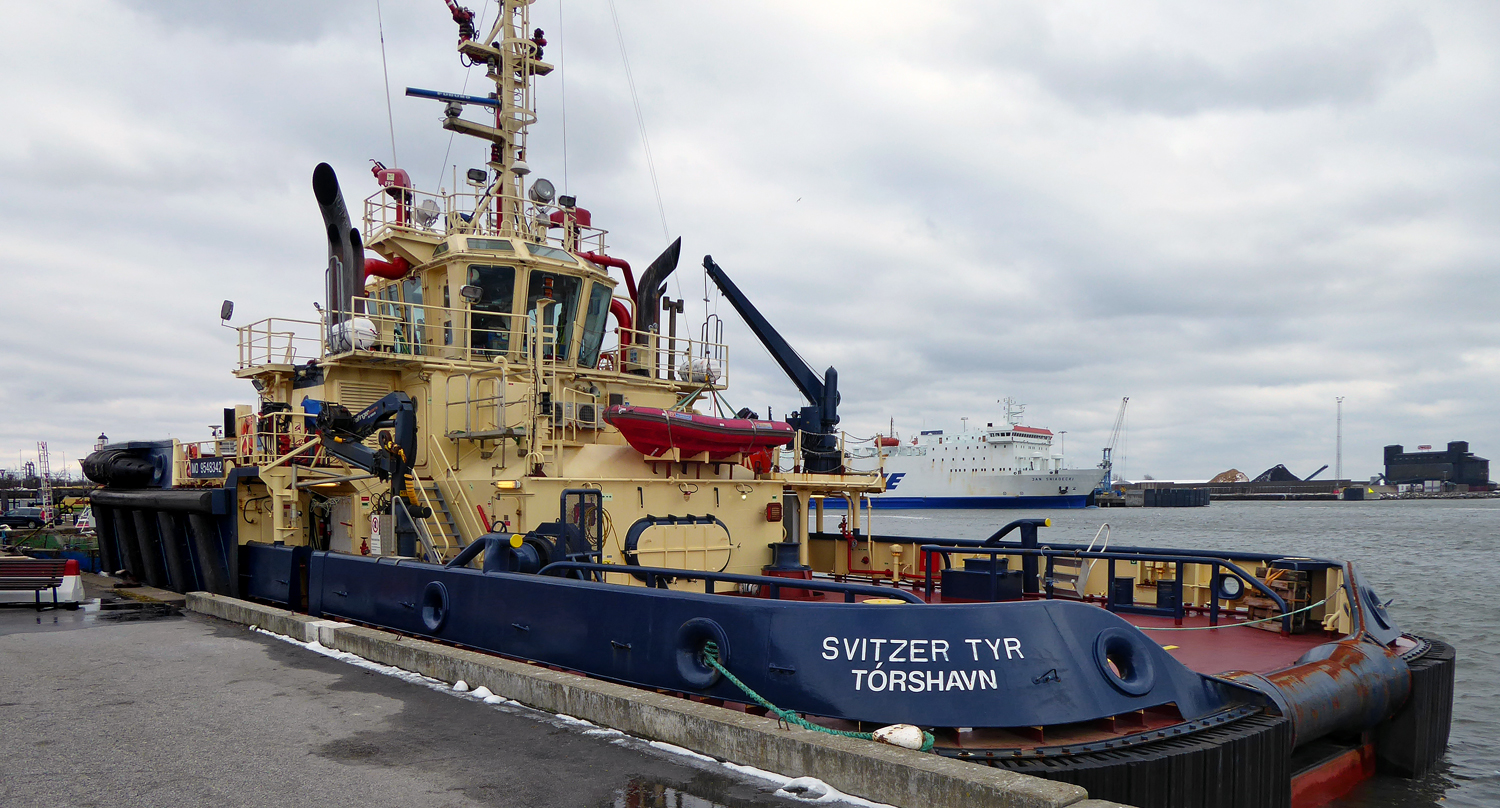
Danish Svitzer Tyr in Ystad harbour 2018

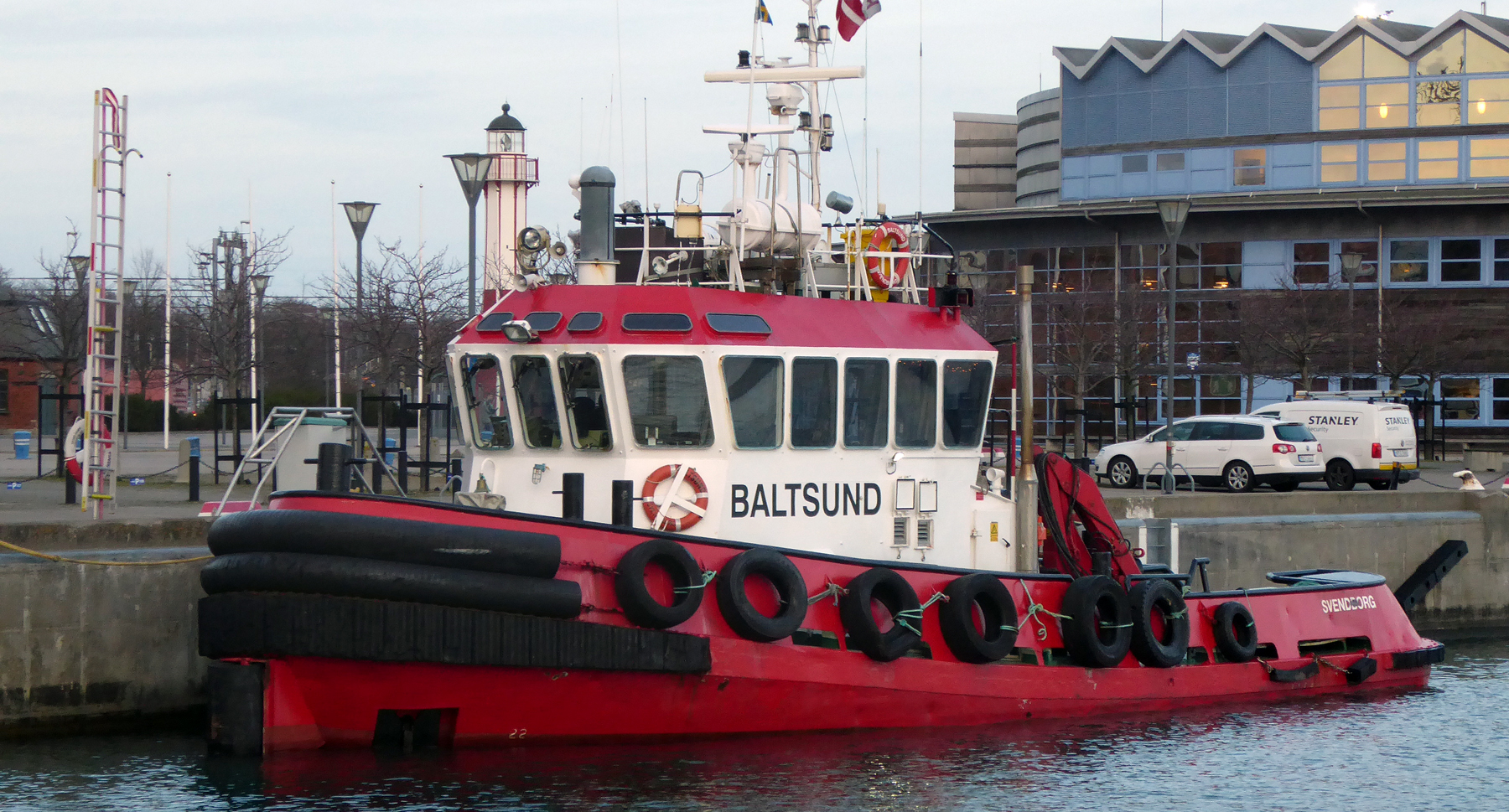
Danish Baltsund in Ystad harbour 2019

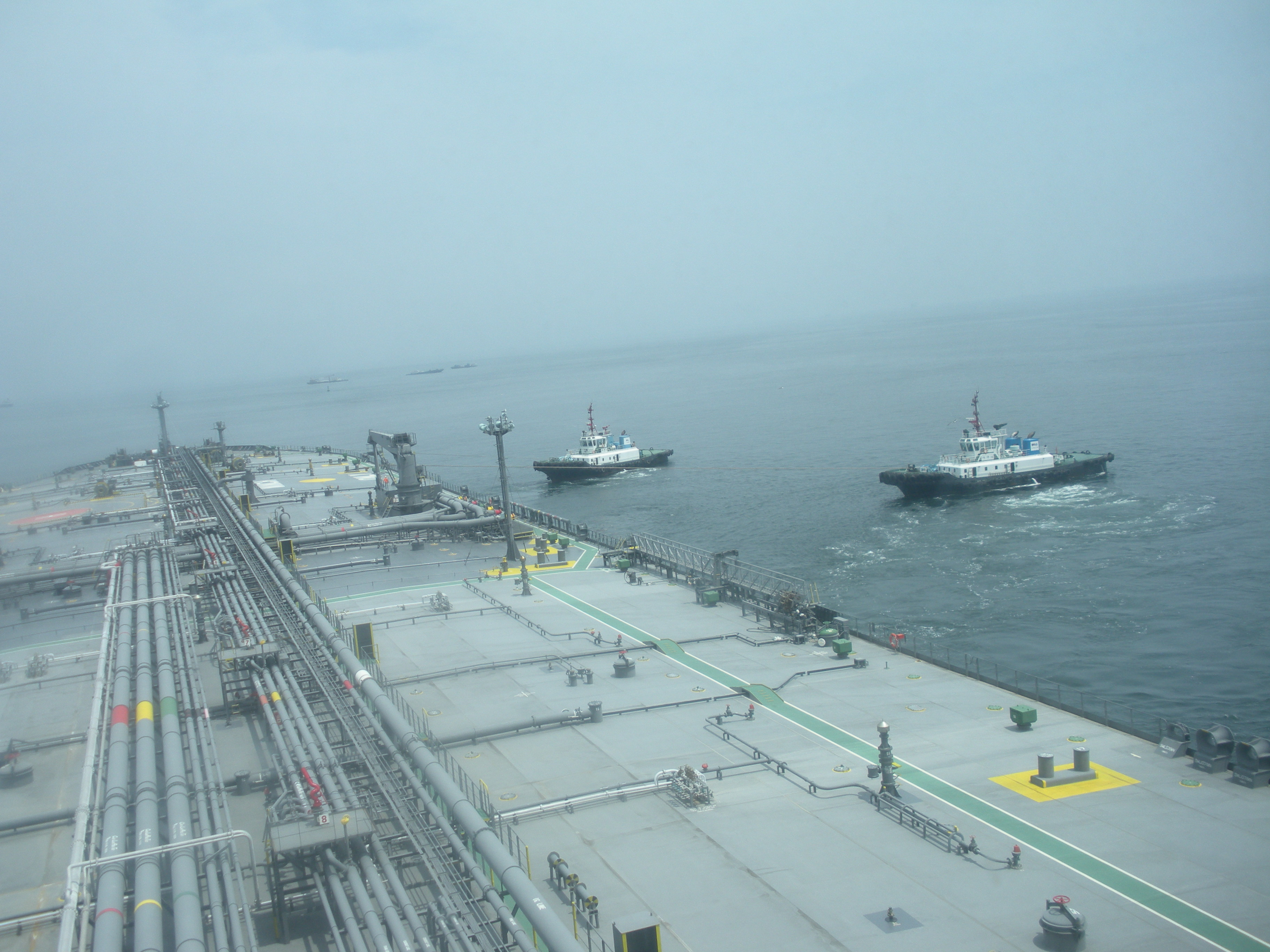
Tugs towing an oil tanker (VLCC)

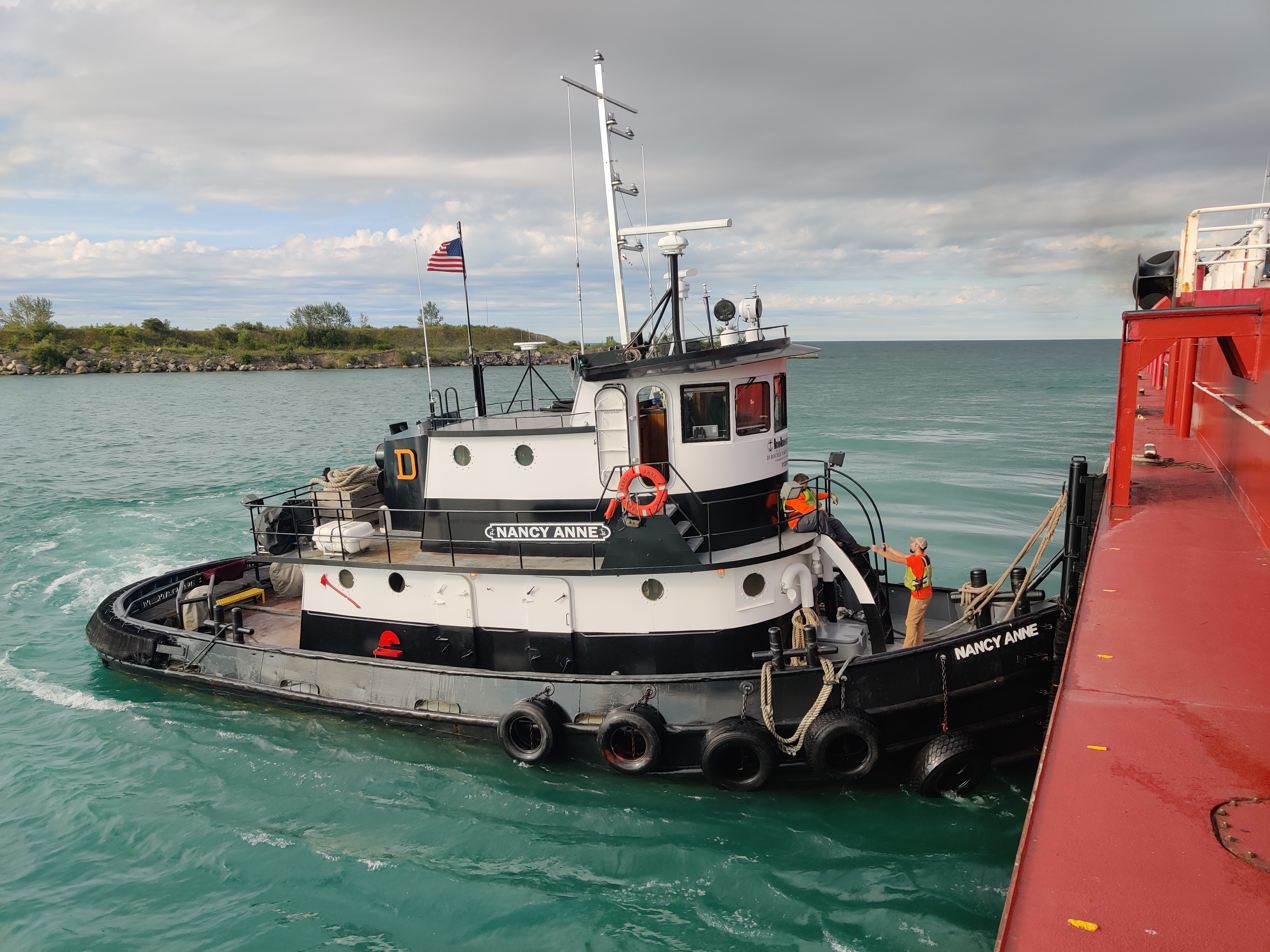
Tugboat Nancy Anne assisting a tug and barge docking in Rogers City, Michigan

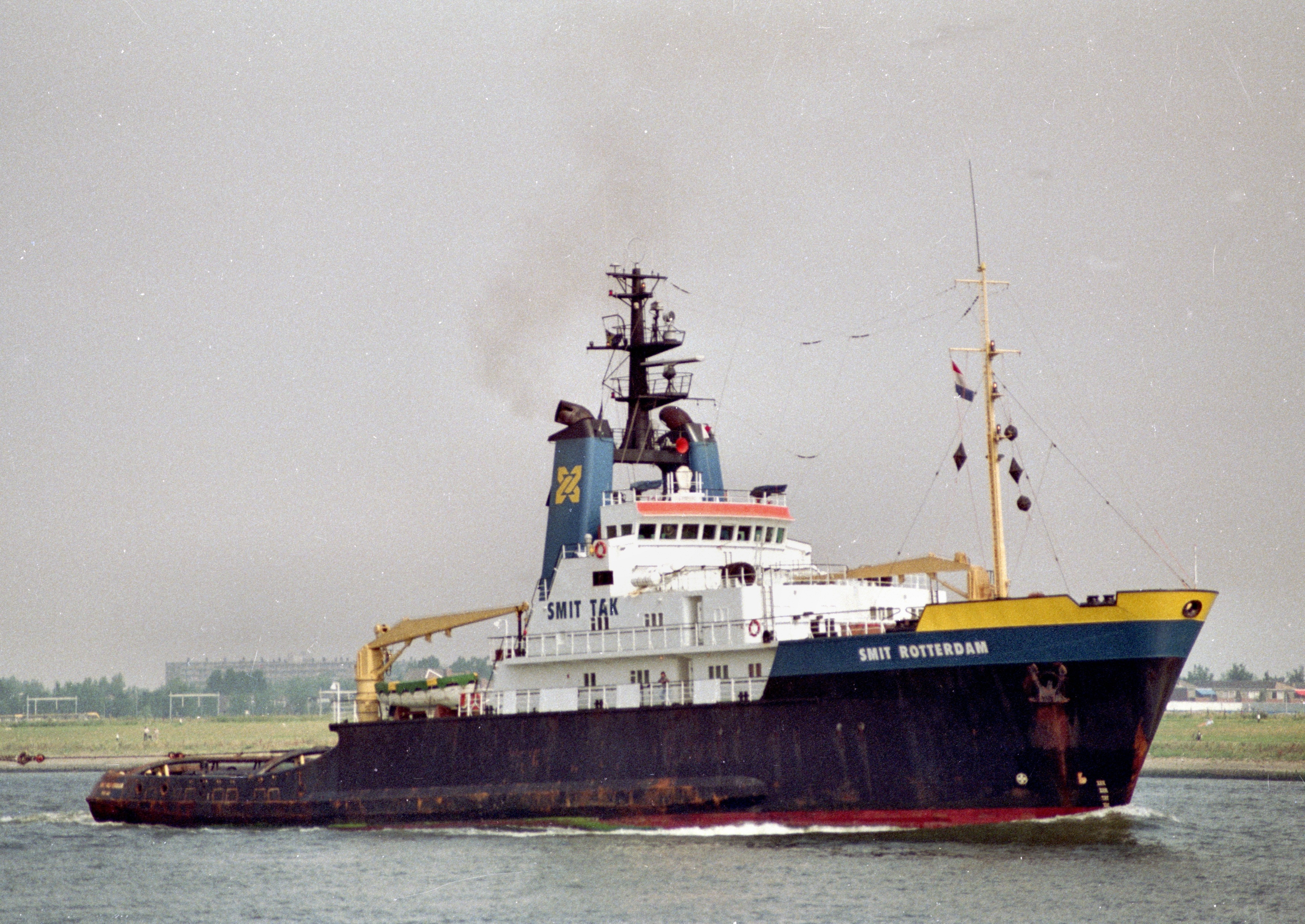
Oceangoing tug Smit Rotterdam arriving at Rotterdam (1987)

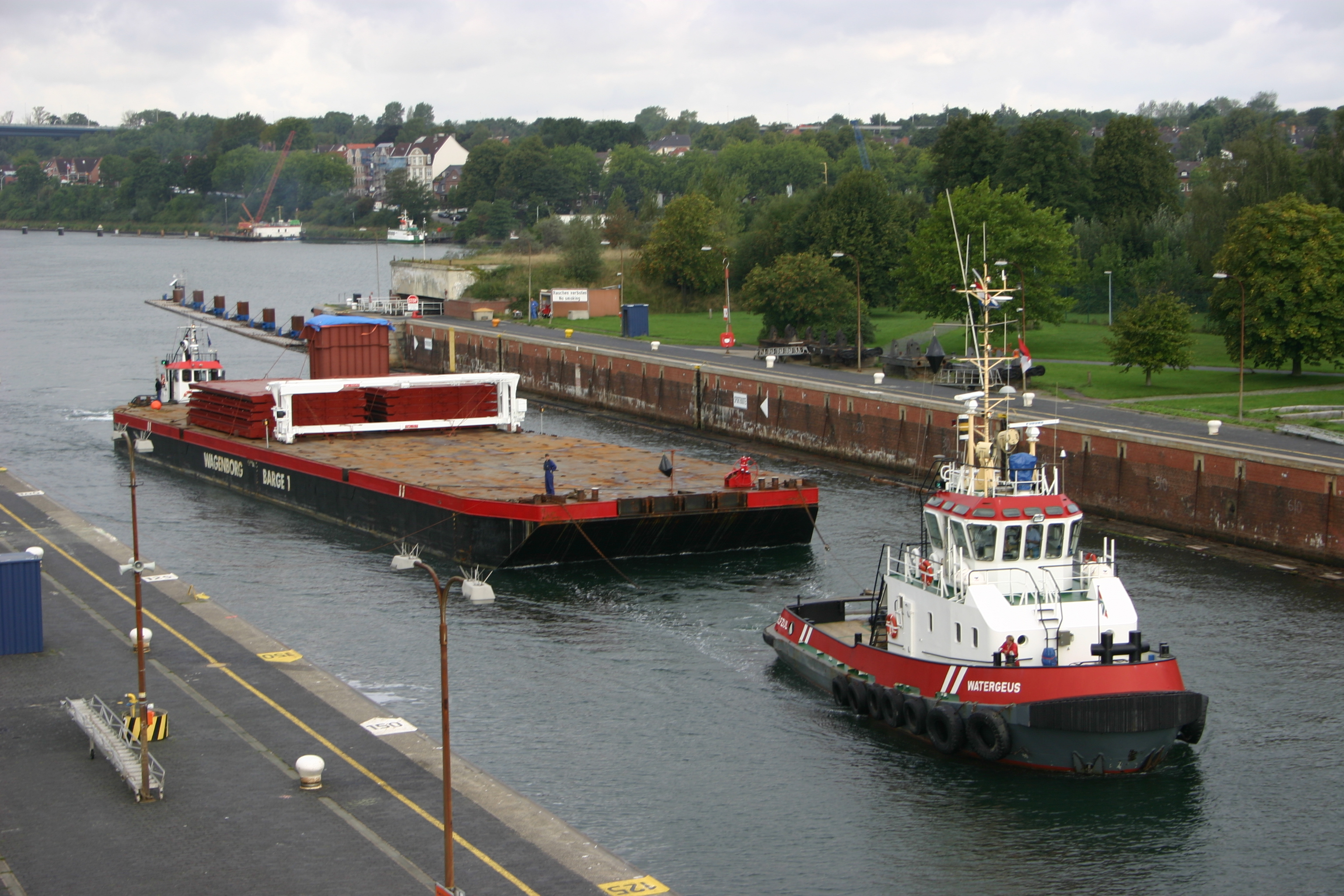
Dutch tugboat Watergeus towing a barge in the locks at Kiel-Holtenau

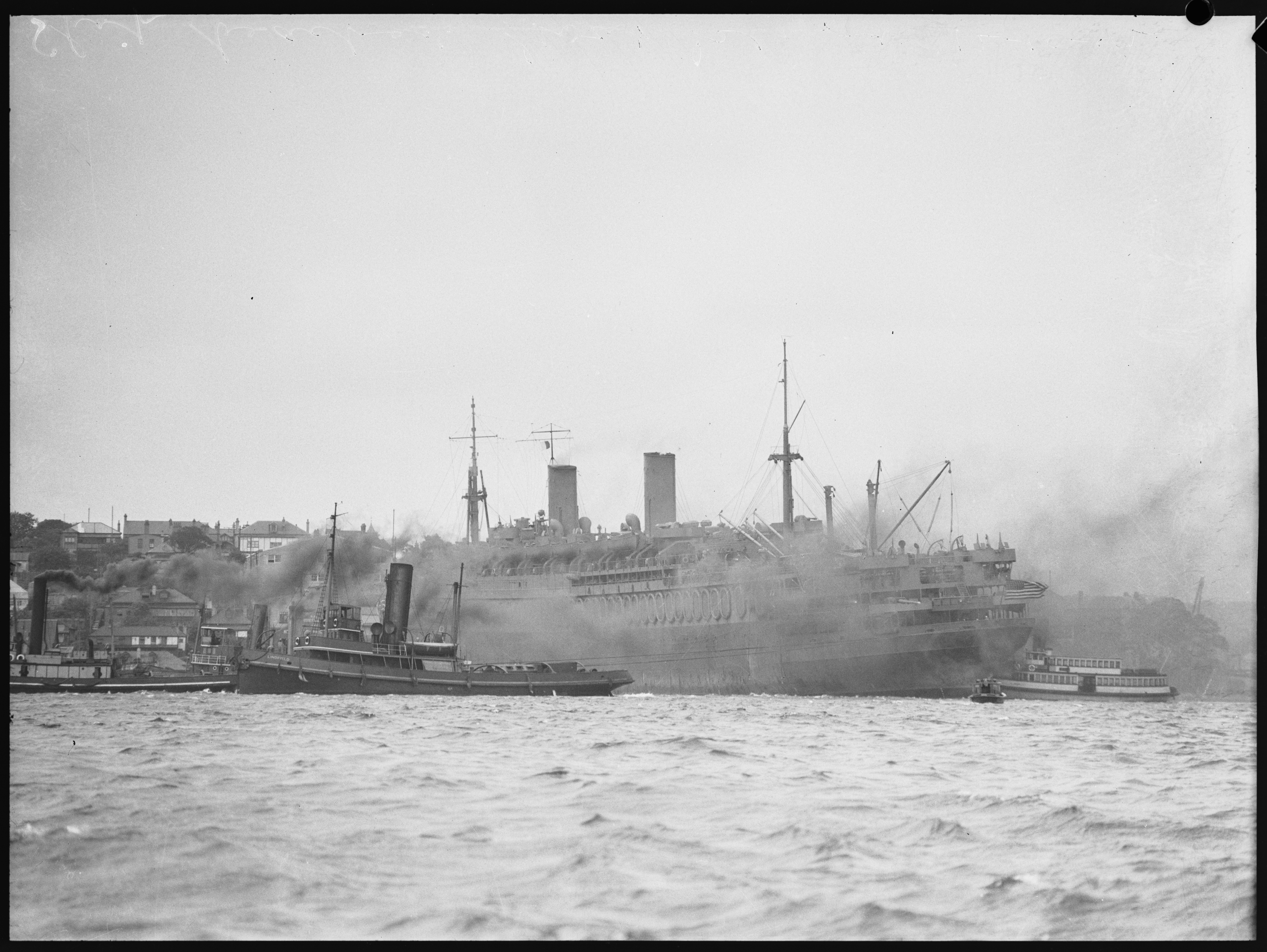
Ship surrounded by tug boats, Sydney, 1942

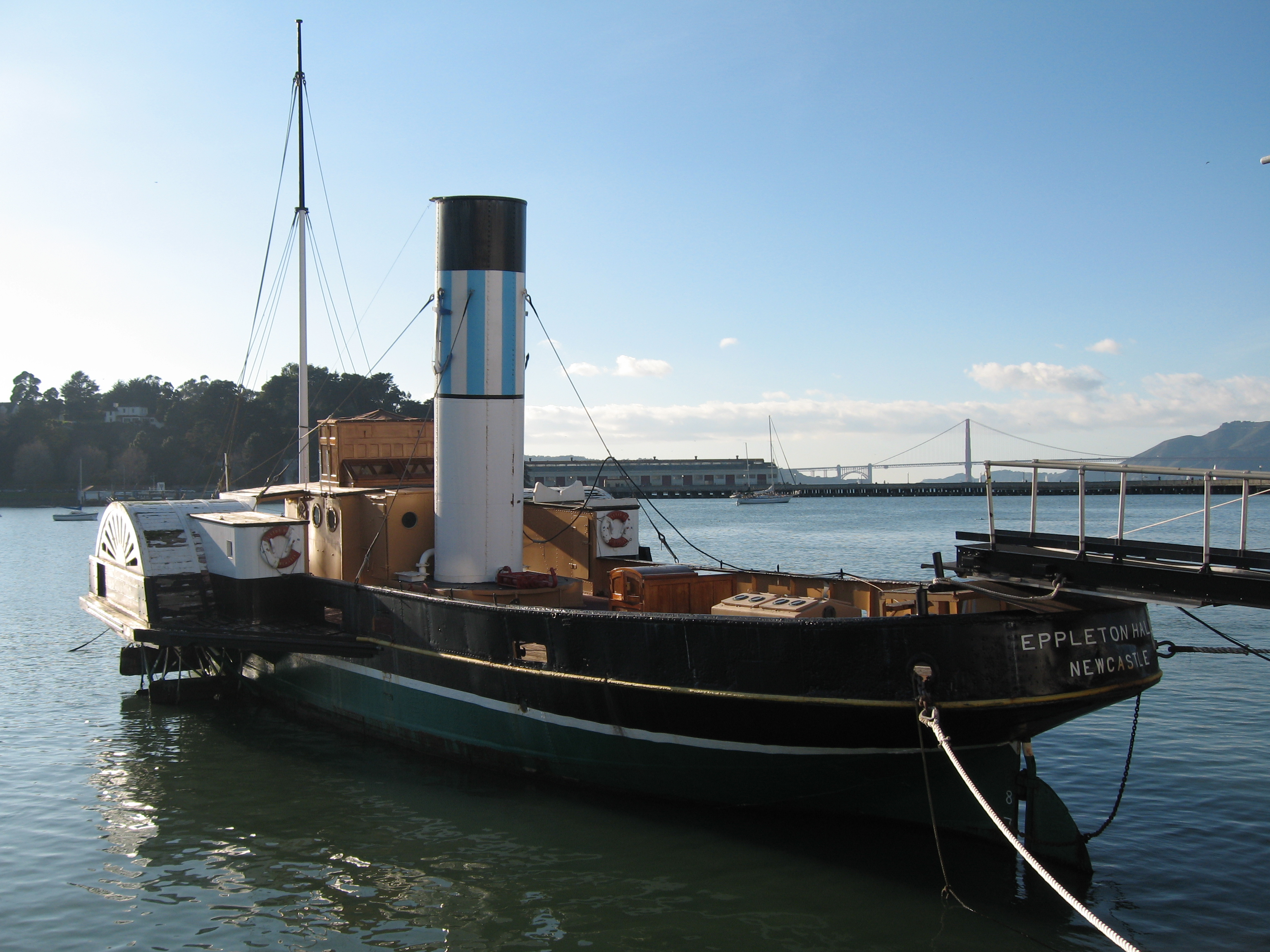
Paddlewheel tugboat Eppleton Hall in San Francisco

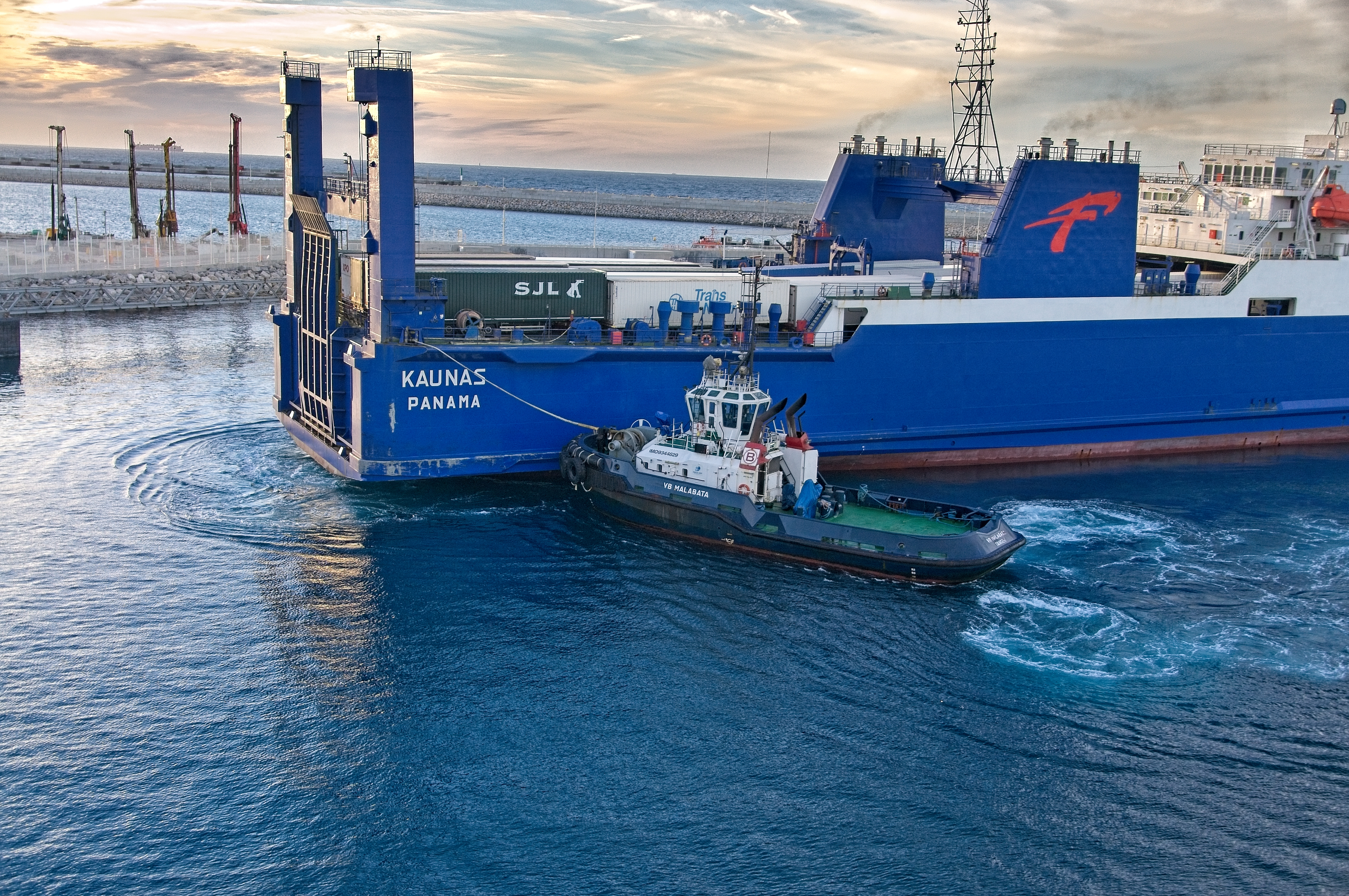
Tugboat VB Malabata in Tangier harbor (2023)

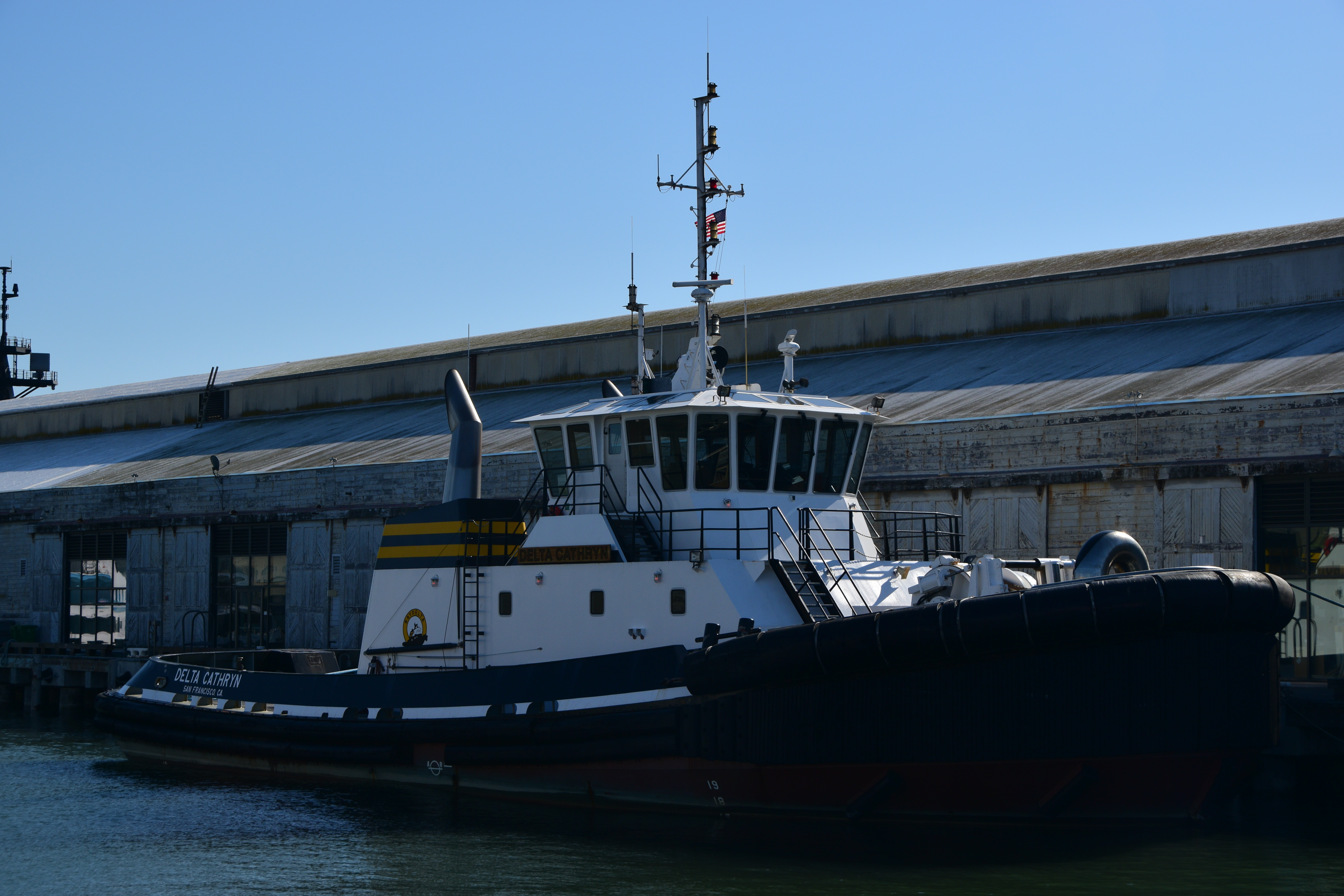
Tugboat Delta Cathryn at Port of San Francisco (2023)

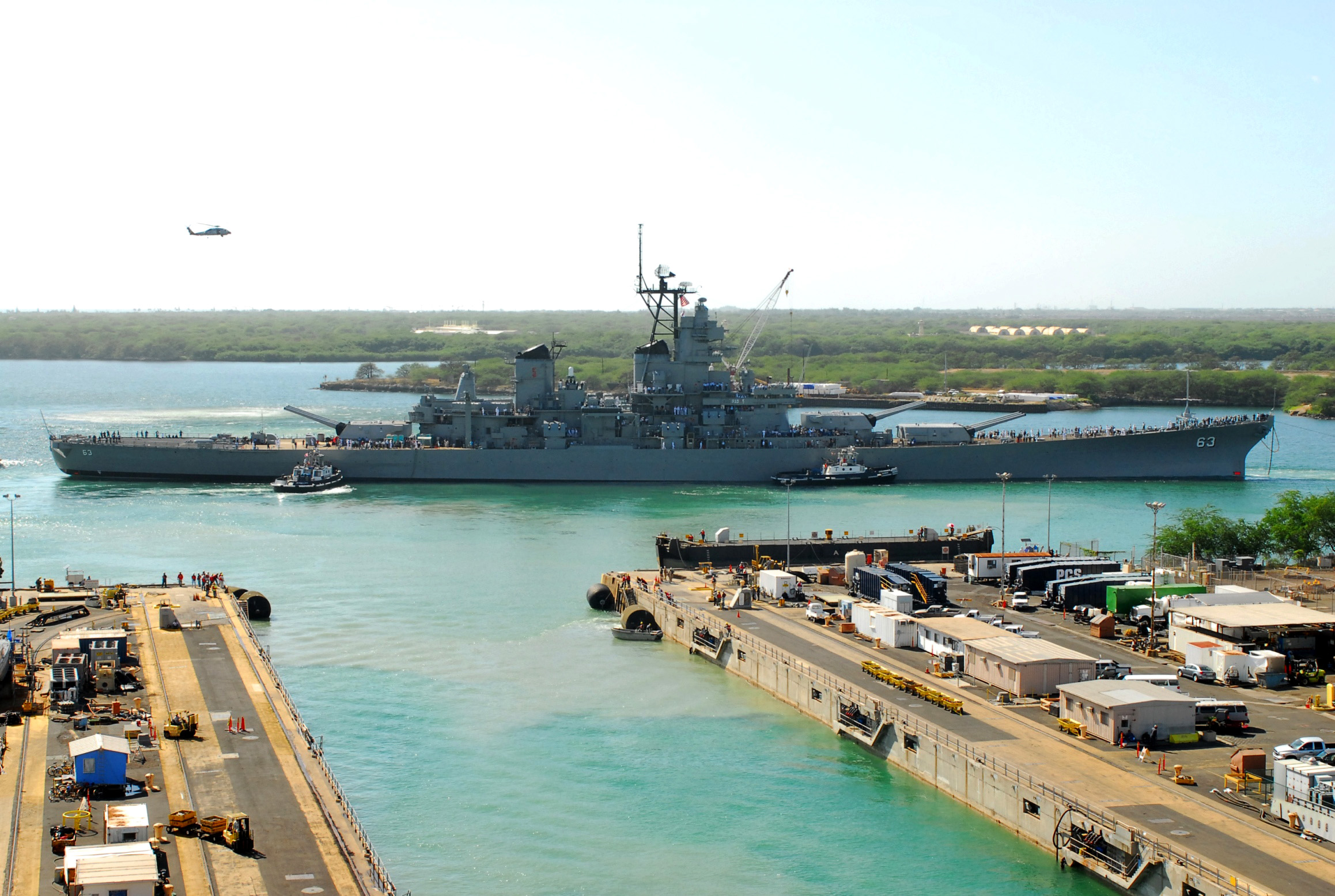
Multiple tugboats towing the battleship Missouri

== See also ==
- Admiralty tug
- American Waterways Operators
- Azipod
- Barrier Boat
- Charlotte Dundas
- Direct methanol fuel cell
- E3 Tug Project
- Fish tug
- HydroTug
- Maritime pilot
- PS Comet
- Pusher (boat)
- Switcher, rail analog
- Type V ship
- List of Naval tugboats
