= HMS Minona =

Steam Yacht

The SY Minona was a steam yacht built before World War I. At the outbreak of the Second World War she was requisitioned by the Royal Navy and later became the flagship for the Commander of His Majesty's Rescue Tug Service and was moored at their principal base facility at Campbeltown on the Mull of Kintyre in Scotland.

Work on the Rescue Tugs required experienced seamen and many men from the Merchant Navy were recruited directly into HM Rescue Tug Service (under T124 articles) and were formally assigned to HMS Minona rather than the Deep Sea Tugs they actually served in.
