= List of ships named Flandre =

A number of ships have been named Flandre or La Flandre. They include:

- SS Flandre (1886), a cargo ship built in 1886 as Tijuca, renamed Valdivia in 1896, Tom G Corpi in 1908, and Flandre in 1909 and scrapped in 1927.
- PS La Flandre (1888), a Belgian State Railway paddle ferry, serving Dover-Ostend, sunk as a blockship in 1918.
- SS La Flandre (1888), an early oil tanker, sunk in 1916.
- SS Flandre (1889), a cargo ship built as Saint Fergus, with French owners from 1908 as Flandre, and wrecked in 1920.
- SS Flandre (1913), an ocean liner built in 1913 for Compagnie Générale Transatlantique (CGT) and sunk by a mine in 1940.
- SS Flandre (1951), an ocean liner built in 1951 for CGT, renamed Carla C in 1968, Carla Costa in 1986 and Pallas Athena in 1992, and scrapped in 1994.

== Naval ships ==
- French ironclad Flandre, commissioned 1865
- French battleship Flandre, launched 1914, but scrapped incomplete
