= The Key (1958 film) =

1958 British war film directed by Carol Reed

- Directed by: Carol Reed
- Written by: Carl Foreman
- Based on: Stella; 1951 novel by Jan de Hartog
- Produced by: Carl Foreman
- Starring: William Holden; Sophia Loren; Trevor Howard
- Cinematography: Oswald Morris
- Edited by: Bert Bates
- Music by: Malcolm Arnold
- Production companies: Open Road Films, Ltd. Highwood Productions, Inc.
- Distributed by: Columbia Pictures
- Release date: 1 July 1958
- Running time: 126 minutes
- Countries: United Kingdom; United States
- Language: English
- Budget: £412,843
- Box office: $7million+(world rentals)

The Key is a 1958 British-American war film set in 1941 during the Battle of the Atlantic. It was based on the 1951 novel Stella by Jan de Hartog (later republished as The Distant Shore and The Key) and was directed by Carol Reed. William Holden, Sophia Loren and Trevor Howard starred in the production.

The key to a flat in wartime Britain may augur bad luck for a succession of tug captains of the Royal Navy whose task is to rescue crippled ships in "U-boat Alley." As each takes possession from his unfortunate predecessor, the flat's other occupant, a Swiss expatriate named Stella, apparently comes with it. The latest captain struggles with his conflicting fears and affection for its apparent jinx.

== Plot ==
American David Ross, a former tugboat captain now in the Canadian Army, is hastily commissioned in the Royal Navy and assigned to rotating command of W88, a double-screwed rescue tug then in dry dock due to battle damage. His predecessor committed suicide. The slow, poorly armed tugs bring in "lame ducks," freighters crippled near Britain by German attacks. The main danger is from U-boats and aircraft.

David is reunited with an old friend, Captain Chris Ford, who commands another tug about to go on a mission. Chris takes David with him and they are attacked twice. That night, Chris takes him home to his flat to meet his lover, Stella, who wears a wedding ring. She had been engaged to Philip Westerby, another tugboat captain, but he was killed the day before their wedding. A friend of Chris's, Van Barger, took possession of the hard-to-find flat and Stella stayed with him. Knowing the extreme danger of his job, Van Barger then gave a copy of his key to the flat to Chris, so that Stella would be taken care of no matter what. When Chris chooses David to be the next in line, he tries to refuse, but his friend is insistent.

David's tug comes out of dry dock and he goes aboard to take his turn of command from the tug's other captain, Van Dam (Oskar Homolka), who gives him tips for survival in combat but warns him that his real enemy is the one within himself, fear. Shaken by his recent close call, Chris proposes marriage to Stella, who accepts. However, she has a premonition that he will not be coming back from his next mission. She is proved correct.

At first, David refuses to move in. When he eventually does, he is surprised that Stella does not share his bed, but as time goes by, she falls in love with him, unlike the others. She puts away her photograph of Philip, gets rid of the uniforms of David's predecessors, and takes off the wedding ring. She also leaves the flat for the first time since Philip was killed. Finally, she asks David to marry her, and he gladly accepts.

With the U.S. entry into the war, an American freighter becomes David's next assignment, even though it is Van Dam's turn. Its inexperienced crew sends out a continuous S.O.S., contrary to sealed orders, revealing the ship's position to the enemy. When David finds out the situation, he tries unsuccessfully to refuse what amounts to a suicide mission. Knowing his chances, he gives his key to the new captain of another tugboat, Chris's former mate, Kane.

David's tug is attacked by a U-boat and hit numerous times. He orders the crew to abandon ship, then rams the submarine. After being rescued, David hurries back to the flat, but Kane is already there, having told Stella that David was killed. When she sees him alive, she screams at him to get out, hurt to the core by his betrayal in passing on the key. Later, Kane finds David drinking his sorrows away, and informs him that Stella is leaving for London on the train. David does not arrive at the station in time to board the train, but vows to Kane that somehow he will find her.

== Cast ==
- William Holden as Lt. Commander David Ross, RNR
- Sophia Loren as Stella
- Trevor Howard as Lt. Commander Chris Ford, RNR
- Oskar Homolka as Captain Van Dam, who alternates command of the tug with David
- Kieron Moore as Lieutenant (later Lt. Commander) Kane, RNR
- Bernard Lee as Lt. Commander Wadlow, RN; the head of the tug fleet
- Beatrix Lehmann as Housekeeper
- Noel Purcell as Hotel Porter
- Bryan Forbes as Lieutenant Weaver, RNR; mate of W88
- Sidney Vivian as Grogan
- Rupert Davies as Baker
- Russell Waters as Sparks
- Irene Handl as Clerk
- John Crawford as American Captain
- Jameson Clark as English Captain

== Production ==
Two endings for The Key were filmed. According to "Notes" at the Turner Classic Movies entry for the film and attributed to the New York Times, one was filmed in which David gets aboard the train for a "happy" ending. In the other, purportedly filmed to satisfy the American Motion Picture Production Code by showing that David and Stella pay for their sexual relationship, he just misses catching it, but insists he will search for and find her. In this explanation the Production Code Administration unexpectedly accepted the happy ending but a few reels of the darker ending were distributed to meet the demands of cinemas during its opening run.

However a published history of British films subjected to PCA scrutiny before their American release presents a slightly different version. After an initial rejection of the story outline in 1952 by the PCA, Carl Foreman resurrected the Stella project in 1957 and was offered two acceptable story lines: one in which Stella has an unconventional but asexual relationship with the captains, the other "a clearcut story of sin and retribution" in which she loses her relationship at the end. The source states that the second version was submitted to the PCA and a certificate issued in June 1958.

A biography of director Carol Reed by Peter William Evans supports the latter contention. It asserts that the original ending released in Europe had David missing the train, and that Reed intended to convey that his vow to find Stella has no more substance than "the steam in which both they and the moving train are shrouded." Evans adds that the happy ending of David catching the train was made for U.S. audiences and was a more "conventional conclusion."

De Hartog's novel, originally entitled Stella, concerned Dutch tugboat captains who fled to England with their craft in 1940 (as represented by the character Captain Van Dam and based on historical fact) and a British woman named Stella. The casting of Holden and Loren necessitated script rationales for their presence in 1941 England, but the appointment of an American in the RNVR as a ship's captain during the early years of World War II was historically possible.

Filming of The Key was done aboard H.M.S. Restive (W39), an Assurance class Admiralty tug of the Royal Navy from the same era.

== Reception ==
Kinematograph Weekly listed it as being "in the money" at the British box office in 1958 saying while the film "fell short of expectations... it still made a lot of money."

Variety listed it as one of the twelve most popular films in Britain that year.

It made $2.2 million in North America in rentals.

== Awards ==
Trevor Howard won the BAFTA Best British Actor Award in 1958 for his performance.
