= Right Here (The Go-Betweens song) =

Single by the Go-Betweens

from the album Tallulah
- B-side: "When People Are Dead"
- Released: 23 February 1987
- Recorded: December 1986 – January 1987
- Genre: Jangle pop; indie pop
- Length: 3:50
- Label: Beggars Banquet (UK); True Tone (AUS); Big Time (US)
- Songwriters: Grant McLennan, Robert Forster
- Producer: Craig Leon

The Go-Betweens singles chronology
"Head Full of Steam" (1986)	"Right Here" (1987)	"Cut It Out" (1987)

"Right Here" is a song by the Australian alternative band the Go-Betweens that was released as the lead single from their fifth album Tallulah. It was released as a 7" and 12" vinyl single on the Beggars Banquet label in the United Kingdom on 23 February 1987, with "When People Are Dead" as the B-side. In Australia it was released by True Tone Records, also as a 7" and 12" single. It was also released In Germany by Rebel Rec. (who issued a number of releases by Beggars Banquet for the German market) and in the United States as a promotional single by Big Time Records.

The song reached No. 82 on the UK Singles Charts but failed to chart elsewhere.

== Details ==
"Right Here" is the first recording by the Go-Betweens that includes Amanda Brown.

In the liner notes for the band's compilation album 1978–1990, Grant McLennan writes that the song is about two friends of his who worked in a funeral parlour and the constant exposure to the chemicals used in the preparation of the bodies turned them into addicts, stating: "I thought this would be a good subject to write about in a pop song." The song's title is derived from the chorus of Forster's song "You've Never Lived" (Spring Hill Fair, 1984).

Robert Forster had a different interpretation of McLennan's lyrics, describing it as "a declaration of love. Amanda had been won and he was proud."

"Right Here", together with the second single, "Cut It Out", were both recorded with producer Craig Leon in London in late December 1986. Lindy Morrison said, "He was chosen to make this single accessible to the people, to get us to crawl out of our cult corner. No, of course it wasn't successful. It's never successful. I don't know why the record company bothers." Elsewhere, Morrison said Leon played her live drum recordings and then a drum machine, and "He turns to the men in the band and says, 'What do you think would be the best for a hit record?' And they went with the drum machine. I cried and cried. Craig Leon was a cunt." Forster denied the story, saying, "That doesn't sound like us. But we all realised that he was always going to use a drum machine anyway. That was his last-minute ambush."

The B-Sides were then recorded in the second week of January 1987, with producer Richard Preston. Steve Miller (the Moodists) and Simon Fisher Turner (aka The King of Luxembourg) contributing guitar and backing vocals to "When People Are Dead". The lyrics were written by an Irish writer, Marian Stout, who met Foster at a gig in London in 1986. The songs were then mixed on 11 January 1987 and cut the next day.

A promotional video was made for the single, directed by Nick Small. The video prominently features McLennan and Brown. The cover for the single was from a painting by McLennan.

== Critical reception ==
Kristi Coulter at AllMusic believes that "it's one of the best love songs in the Go-Betweens' not-inconsiderable catalog of them" and the "melody is one of Grant McLennan's most memorable and the lyrics among his most heartfelt." She goes on to state that "'Right Here' is that rarest of things, a love song that promises rescue while also strongly hinting that its subject take some responsibility for herself."

Thom Jurek of AllMusic wrote "multi-tracked violins drive the center of the tune sprightly, in an off-rail, cut-time tempo. Robert Vickers' colorful keyboards and Morrison's programming are truly adornments, but McLennan's soulful yet philosophical vocal anchors the tune on bedrock and is supported by a beautiful chorus of backing vocals led by Brown."

Record Mirror wrote, "It borders precariously on the twee side, only just saving itself courtesy of Grant MacLennan's nasal passages, his vocals adding a certain sarcastic sneer." NME called it "a shotgun wedding between Bunnymen and Tin Pan Alley which provides the firepower. Their best yet."

== Track listing ==
All tracks are written by G. McLennan, R. Forster

7" vinyl release
No.	Title	Length
1.	"Right Here"	3:50
2.	"When People Are Dead" (lyrics by Marian Stout)	4:29
Total length:		8:19

All tracks are written by G. McLennan, R. Forster.

12" vinyl release
No.	Title	Length
1.	"Right Here"	3:53
2.	"A Little Romance"	2:20
3.	"Don't Call Me Gone"	2:20
4.	"When People Are Dead" (lyrics by Marion Stout)	4:29
Total length:		12:08

== Release history ==
Region	Date	Label	Format	Catalogue
United Kingdom	February 1987	Beggars Banquet	7" vinyl	BEG 183
United Kingdom	February 1987	Beggars Banquet	12" vinyl	BEG 183T
Australia	February 1987	True Tone	7" vinyl	888 390–7
Australia	February 1987	True Tone	12" vinyl	888 390–1
Germany	1987	Rebel Rec.	7" vinyl	RE 0042
Germany	1987	Rebel Rec.	12" vinyl	RE 0051
United States	1987	Big Time	12" vinyl	6054-1-BDAA

== Credits ==
The Go-Betweens

- Amanda Brown — violin, backing vocals
- Grant McLennan — vocals, guitar
- Lindy Morrison — drums
- Robert Forster — vocals, guitar
- Robert Vickers — bass

Additional musicians

- Steve Miller — guitar ("When People Are Dead")
- Simon Fisher Turner — backing vocals ("When People Are Dead")

Production

- Producer – Craig Leon ("Right Here")
- Assistant Producer – Cassell Webb ("Right Here")
- Producer — Richard Preston ("A Little Romance", "Don't Call Me Gone", "When People Are Dead")
