= Bye Bye Pride =

Single by The Go-Betweens

from the album Tallulah
- A-side: "Bye Bye Pride"
- B-side: "The House That Jack Kerouac Built"
- Released: August 1987
- Recorded: January 1987
- Genre: Jangle pop; indie pop
- Length: 4:06
- Label: Beggars Banquet (UK); True Tone (AUS)
- Songwriter: Grant McLennan
- Producer: Richard Preston

The Go-Betweens singles chronology
| "I Just Get Caught Out" (1987) | "Bye Bye Pride" (1987) | "Streets of Your Town" (1988) |

"Bye Bye Pride" is a song by Australian alternative band The Go-Betweens that first appeared on their fifth studio album Tallulah. It was released as a 7" and 12" vinyl single on the Beggars Banquet label in the United Kingdom in August 1987, with "The House That Jack Kerouac Built" as the B-side. In Australia it was released in 1987 by True Tone Records, with "Time In The Desert" as the B-Side. "Time In The Desert" was originally released as the B-side of the band's earlier single, "Cut It Out" (the second single from Tallulah). True Tone subsequently in 1988 re-released the single with a new B-side, "The Clarke Sisters".

The song failed to chart in either the UK or Australia however "Bye Bye Pride" was voted in at No. 89 in Triple J's Hottest 100 for 1989 and No. 85 in the Hottest 100 for 1990. At that time listeners could vote for songs released in any year.

Forster wrote that, "Grant's majestic "Bye Bye Pride, with one of the best opening lines ever, was a ten-foot wave driven by Lindy's snare, with Amanda's piping oboe the froth on top."

== Critical reception ==
Kristi Coulter at Allmusic states "For a lost-love song, "Bye Bye Pride" sounds positively joyous, rivaling "Love Goes On!" as the most ebullient entry in the Go-Betweens' catalog. It boasts one of Grant McLennan's most indelible melodies, which is saying something—at once soaring and stately, embellished by Amanda Brown's stellar oboe accompaniment, it's about as close to epic as the band ever got." Mojo agreed, "an all-time band classic, with the best ever oboe solo in rock n roll".

Popmatters' Jason McNeil's considers that the song "returns to the band’s abundant strengths - witty lyrics and music making for heavenly ear candy."

In 2015 Steve Kilbey (the Church) selected "Bye Bye Pride" as one of his top ten Australian songs, stating "This song is so full of longing and regret and naive hope. The lyrics are so Brisbane I can almost see it all happening right before me. I never could grow sick of this song." The Courier-Mail's Noel Mengel called it, "One of the greatest rock songs of the '80s"

== Track listing ==
=== Original 7" Vinyl release ===
All tracks are written by G. McLennan, R. Forster

| No. | Title | Length |
|---|---|---|
| 1. | "Bye Bye Pride" | 4:06 |
| 2. | "The House That Jack Kerouac Built" (Recorded for the Andy Kershaw Show on BBC Radio 1) | 4:41 |

=== Original 12" Vinyl release ===
All tracks are written by G. McLennan, R. Forster

| No. | Title | Length |
|---|---|---|
| 1. | "Bye Bye Pride" | 4:06 |
| 2. | "The House That Jack Kerouac Built" (Recorded for the Andy Kershaw Show on BBC Radio 1) | 4:41 |
| 3. | "Bye Bye Pride" (Recorded for the Andy Kershaw Show on BBC Radio 1) |

== Release history ==
| Region | Date | Label | Format | Catalogue |
|---|---|---|---|---|
| United Kingdom | August 1987 | Beggars Banquet | 7" vinyl | BEG 194 |
| United Kingdom | August 1987 | Beggars Banquet | 12" vinyl | BEG 194T |
| Australia | 1987 | True Tone | 7" vinyl | 888 781-7 |
| Australia | 1988 | True Tone | 7" vinyl | TS 2078 |

== Credits ==
The Go-Betweens

- Amanda Brown — oboe, backing vocals
- Grant McLennan — guitar, lead vocals
- Lindy Morrison — drums
- Robert Forster — backing vocals, guitar
- Robert Vickers — bass

Production

- Producer — Richard Preston ("Bye Bye Pride")
- Producer — Dale Griffin ("The House That Jack Kerouac Built")
- Engineer — Mark Colley ("The House That Jack Kerouac Built")
