= Cut It Out (song) =

Single by the Go-Betweens

from the album Tallulah
- A-side: "Cut It Out"
- B-side: "Time in the Desert"
- Released: 11 May 1987
- Recorded: December 1986; January 1987
- Genre: Jangle pop; indie pop
- Length: 3:58
- Label: Beggars Banquet
- Songwriters: Grant McLennan, Robert Forster
- Producer: Craig Leon

The Go-Betweens singles chronology
"Right Here" (1987)	"Cut It Out" (1987)	"I Just Get Caught Out" (1988)

"Cut It Out" is a song by the Australian alternative band the Go-Betweens that was released as the second single their fifth studio album Tallulah. It was released as a 7" and 12" vinyl single on the Beggars Banquet label in the United Kingdom on 11 May 1987, with "Time in the Desert" as the B-side.

"Cut It Out" was recorded with producer Craig Leon in London in late December 1986. "Time in the Desert" was then recorded in the second week in January, with producer Richard Preston.

== Details ==
Robert Forster described the song as "a riffy thing that we would jam on backstage; it had a choppy, mid-60s R&B feel to it." Unhappy with the recording, Forster wrote that it is "the worst song in the Go-Betweens catalogue."

== Critical reception ==
Ian Cranna in his review of the song in Smash Hits states: "surprise galore with a most un-folky laboured guitar and drum machine 'riff', great backing vocalists and swirling organ followed by a contrasting heavenly girlie chorus. It's a wonderful piece of work but doomed as a single because those dullards at Radio One will never play anything so adventurous." John Aizlewood however was less enthusiastic in his review commenting "Poor little Go-Betweens, always searching for the hit in the haystack. Never finding it. This isn't the hit, beautiful, stately and dignified though it is. 'Spring Rain' was the hit and that wasn't, if you follow."

Jason McNeil in PopMatters believes that the song "follows a different path, yet the chorus is pure gold, drawing the listener in again." Sounds felt the single was a "mildly disappointing" follow up to "Right Here", but described it as, "A swaggering stomp that bursts a bouquet of lyrical barbed wire over an expensive sounding bass sound and a sharply punctuating backbeat."

In his review of Tallulah at AllMusic, Thom Jurek describes "the nearly funky organ and bass swirl of "Cut It Out," is unlike any Go-Betweens song before or since."

In David Nichols' book The Go-Betweens, he describes "Cut It Out" as representing "very neatly what striving for commercial success was doing to the Go-Betweens. It is disjointed, mechanical, and trite, and while in some cases such attributes can combine to make winning pop music, 'Cut It Out' is just a slender tune battered to death by studio effects."

== Track listing ==
All tracks are written by G. McLennan, R. Forster

7" vinyl release
No.	Title	Length
1.	"Cut It Out"	3:58
2.	"Time in the Desert"	2:32
Total length:		6:30

All tracks are written by G. McLennan, R. Forster, except where noted.

12" vinyl release
No.	Title	Length
1.	"Cut It Out"	6:23
2.	"Time in the Desert"	3:51
3.	"Doo Wop in 'A' (Bam Boom)" (A. Brown, G. McLennan, L. Morrison, R. Forster)	2:53
Total length:		13:07

== Release history ==
Region	Date	Label	Format	Catalogue
United Kingdom	May 1987	Beggars Banquet	7" vinyl	BEG 190
United Kingdom	May 1987	Beggars Banquet	12" vinyl	BEG 190T

== Credits ==
The Go-Betweens

- Amanda Brown — violin, backing vocals
- Grant McLennan — lead vocals, guitar
- Lindy Morrison — drums
- Robert Forster — backing vocals, guitar
- Robert Vickers — bass

Production

- Producer – Craig Leon ("Cut It Out")
- Assistant Producer – Cassell Webb ("Cut It Out")
- Engineer – Sid Wells ("Cut It Out")
- Producer — Richard Preston ("Time in the Desert")
