= Peter Milton Walsh =

Australian singer-songwriter and guitarist

- Genres: Chamber pop, post-punk, alternative
- Occupations: Singer-songwriter; multi-instrumentalist; writer; composer; arranger
- Instruments: Guitar, piano, bass guitar, vocals
- Years active: 1978–present
- Labels: Riley Records, Chapter Music, Talitres
- Formerly of: The Apartments, Out of Nowhere, Laughing Clowns, The Go-Betweens
- Website: theapartments-music.com

Peter Milton Walsh is an Australian singer-songwriter and guitarist best known for his band, The Apartments.

== The Apartments ==
Peter Milton Walsh is the sole singer songwriter for The Apartments, formed in Brisbane in 1978 and named after Billy Wilder's 1960 film The Apartment.

The Go-Betweens, a Brisbane band Walsh was a member of briefly, wrote “Don't Let Him Come Back” commemorating Walsh's style and his time with them "Here he comes, with his twelve o’clock junk...who's that dressed in black? Who's that in his apartment?" This song, still performed by Robert Forster, was covered by Jay Reatard in 2008.

The close connection continued with Walsh writing liner notes Volume 1 and Volume 2 of G Stands for Go-Betweens: The Go-Betweens Anthology, the only writer to appear on both volumes. As an ex-band member and close confidant of Robert Forster and Grant McLennan, Walsh also appeared in the Kriv Stenders documentary Right Here.

A gifted writer Walsh has published pieces online and in print including “The Man with a Blue Cornflower” and appeared at the 2016 Brisbane Rock and Roll Writers Festival.

Personal circumstances saw Walsh remove himself from public life in 1997, at which point he stopped recording and touring. He resumed international performances in 2009 in France, having taken part in the 2007 Pig City: Brisbane's Historical Soundtrack a one-day music festival held as part of the Queensland Music Festival . From that point onwards Walsh has released a range of recordings by The Apartments, including two live and one studio albums, a single and one live EP, re-issues of three earlier albums. He continues to tour in Australia and Europe, usually with a full band and at times as a solo performer. Based in Sydney Australia after having lived in London and New York in the 1980s, 2018 saw Walsh based in France for an extended period, supporting his band's touring and his personal collaborations with other artists.

While The Apartments line up evolves based on the location of shows, key collaborators in Australia and France form the backbone of the band. The latest release LIVE at L’Ubu included band members from Australia, the UK and France which toured France in 2015.

Walsh's songs have been covered by This Mortal Coil with "Mr Somewhere" on their 1991 album Blood. Ed Kuepper performed "Places Where The Night Is Long" on his 1995 album " Exotic Mail Order Moods".

Walsh wrote "The Shyest Time" which was featured on the soundtrack of John Hughes' movie Some Kind of Wonderful.

In 2017 he appeared as guest vocalist on "Attention to Life", a track on UK-based Piano Magic's final album, Closure.

American writer Kirsti Coulter published in August 2018 The Sad Boys of Sadcore in The Paris Review detailing her following of both Peter Milton Walsh and Mark Eitzel.

== Discography ==
with The Apartments

=== Albums ===
Title	Release date	Label	Notes
the evening visits...and stays for years	1985	Rough Trade/Virgin France S.A.	Reissued in 2015 by Captured Tracks
drift	1992	New Rose/Torn & Frayed	Reissued 2011, 2017 by Talitres, Riley Records
A Life Full of Farewells	1995	Hot	
fête foraine	1996	Hot	Reissued 2017 by Microcultures + Riley Records
apart	1997	Hot	
Seven Songs	2013	Talitres	2013 Disquaire Day / Record Store Day Release
No Song, No Spell, No Madrigal	2015	Microcultures/Riley Records	Issued in 2016 in Australia by Riley Records with bonus tracks
Live at L'Ubu	2019	Talitres/Riley Records	2019 Disquaire Day / Record Store Day Release

=== Singles, EPs ===
Title	Format	Release date	Label	Notes	UK Independent Chart
the return of the hypnotist	7-inch EP	1979	Able Label	Reissued 2017	
"All You Wanted"	7-inch	1984	Hot		
"All You Wanted"	7-inch/12-inch	1985	Rough Trade		29
"The Shyest Time"	7-inch	1987	MCA	Split single with Flesh For Lulu	
"The Shyest Time"	7-inch/12-inch	1988	Glass		
Sunset Hotel	CD EP	1994	New Rose		
Life	CD EP	1995	Hot		
"Part"	CD	1997	Hot		
"Black Ribbons"	7-inch	2011	Riley Records/Chapter Music		

=== Compilation tracks ===
- Some Kind of Wonderful Soundtrack (1987), MCA: "The Shyest Time"
- POPvolume#1 (1999), POPnews: "Knowing You Were Loved"
- Behind the Banana Curtain – a collection of 41 Brisbane bands (2000), 4ZZZ: "Help"
- Can't Stop It! Australian Post-Punk 1978-82 (2005) Chapter: "Help"
- Inner City Soundtrack (2005) Laughing Outlaw: "All You Wanted"

with The Go-Betweens

- Lee Remick/I Want to Be Today 7-inch (Beserkley, 1979) – guitar on "I Want to Be Today" Unreleased Single
- Karen/The Sound of Rain 7-inch (Beserkley, 1979) - guitar on "The Sound of Rain" Unreleased Single
- 78 'Til 79: The Lost Album (Tag 5, 1999) - guitar on "The Sound of Rain"

with Out of Nowhere

- Forced Audience various artists cassette release with Xero, Four Gods (No Label, 1981)- guitar and vocals
- The Arrangements Cassette with Pink & Blue (ANTI-MUSIC, 1981) - guitar and vocals
- Remember, Remember/No Resistance 7-inch (Prince Melon, 1982) - guitar and vocals

with Laughing Clowns

- Law of Nature LP (Hot, 1984) bass guitar
- Eternally Yours 12-inch (Hot, 1984) bass guitar
- Crystal Clear/Law of Nature 7-inch Flexidisc (Sydney Trade Union Club, 1984) bass guitar
