= Tallulah (The Go-Betweens album) =

Studio album by the Go-Betweens
- Released: 1 June 1987
- Recorded: Camden, London, England
- Genres: Alternative rock, indie rock, new wave
- Length: 39:11
- Labels: Beggars Banquet; LO-MAX
- Producer: Richard Preston

The Go-Betweens chronology
Liberty Belle and the Black Diamond Express (1986)	Tallulah (1987)	16 Lovers Lane (1988)

Singles from Tallulah
- 1. "Right Here" Released: 23 February 1987; 2. "Cut It Out" Released: 11 May 1987; 3. "I Just Get Caught Out" Released: 1987; 4. "Bye Bye Pride" Released: August 1987

Tallulah is the fifth studio album by the Go-Betweens. It was released on 1 June 1987 in the UK on Beggars Banquet Records. Prior to the recording of the album, the group had expanded to a five-piece with the addition of multi-instrumentalist Amanda Brown. The original release consisted of ten songs. In 2004, LO-MAX Records released an expanded CD which included a second disc of ten bonus tracks and music videos for the songs "Right Here" and "Bye Bye Pride".

== Recording ==
Initial recording was done with Craig Leon in an attempt to make more commercial music. Only two tracks, both featuring synthesisers and drum machines, were ever completed, including the single "Right Here". The Go-Betweens' co-founder Robert Forster later wrote that the band were "playing day after day, getting tighter and tighter, believing at least two of us would be playing on the recordings at the same time. Why did we bother? We arrived on the first day of the session to find Craig behind a bank of keyboards filling the control room, programming the drums, bass and organ lines."

With much of the recording budget spent on two songs, the remaining sessions with a new producer were hurried and the band was unhappy with the initial results. Forster said, "We were sort of cursed. We had the engineer that we were using on Liberty Belle, Dicky Preston, and working with Dicky was good. We then went on to the next one and we were put into this horrible studio it was over a practice room or something. And so Dicky didn't do a good job I think on Tallulah, so it had to be rescued and remixing a little but which always sounds horrible but it actually worked out okay with Mark Wallis."

On the addition of Amanda Brown, Forster said, "with a violin and oboe player in the band, it meant we sounded like no one else. Which is always a good thing. On Tallulah she broadened our sound, and gave it more drama, which the songs needed."

== Reception ==
Professional ratings
Review scores
Source	Rating
AllMusic	3.5/5 stars
Blender	5/5 stars
Christgau's Record Guide	A
Mojo	4/5 stars
NME	8/10
PopMatters	8/10
The Rolling Stone Album Guide	3.5/5 stars
Select	4/5
Sounds	5/5 stars
Spin Alternative Record Guide	8/10

Robert Christgau said, "They stick to what they know, and their knowledge increases. The quartet's a quintet now, up one violin, which may not seem like much but does serve to reinforce the hooks that have never been a strength of their understated, ever more explicit tales from the bourgeois fringe. I soon got involved with every song on the album."

Thom Jurek of AllMusic found that "despite its production it has aged exceptionally well although it remains a product firmly of its time. The raw emotion, vulnerable tenderness and romantic desperation in its songs, textured by the blend of strings and keyboards, adds depth and dimension to this well of fine songs."

== Track listing ==
All tracks are written by Grant McLennan and Robert Forster.

Original 1987 release
No.	Title	Length
1.	"Right Here"	3:53
2.	"You Tell Me"	3:38
3.	"Someone Else's Wife"	4:10
4.	"I Just Get Caught Out"	2:16
5.	"Cut It Out"	3:58
6.	"The House That Jack Kerouac Built"	4:41
7.	"Bye Bye Pride"	4:06
8.	"Spirit of a Vampyre"	3:57
9.	"The Clarke Sisters"	3:22
10.	"Hope Then Strife"	4:54
11.	"Right Here" (video on 2004 expanded CD)
12.	"Bye Bye Pride" (video on 2004 expanded CD)

All tracks are written by Grant McLennan and Robert Forster, except where noted.

2004 bonus disc
No.	Title	Writer(s)	Length
1.	"Time in the Desert"		3:50
2.	"I Just Get Caught Out" (early version)		2:32
3.	"Don't Call Me Gone"		2:17
4.	"Right Here" (early version)		3:40
5.	"If I Was A Rich Man/The House Jack Kerouac Built" (radio session)	"If I was a Rich Man" - Jerry Bock, Sheldon Harnick	3:34
6.	"When People Are Dead"		4:29
7.	"The Clarke Sisters" (early version)		3:10
8.	"A Little Romance"		3:41
9.	"Bye Bye Pride" (radio session)		3:47
10.	"Doo Wop in 'A' (Bam Boom)"	Amanda Brown, Lindy Morrison, McLennan, Forster	2:53

== Personnel ==
The Go-Betweens

- Amanda Brown – violin, oboe, guitar, keyboards, vocals
- Robert Forster – vocals, rhythm guitar
- Grant McLennan – vocals, lead guitar, piano
- Lindy Morrison – drums
- Robert Vickers – bass guitar

Additional musicians

- Audrey Riley – cello
- El Tito – Flamenco guitar
- Simon Fisher-Turner – backing vocals
- Colin Lloyd-Tucker – backing vocals

=== Production ===
- Photography – Peter Anderson
- Producer – Craig Leon on "Right Here and "Cut It Out"
- Producer – Richard Preston
- Mastering - Barry Grint
