= John Willsteed =

Australian musician and sound designer

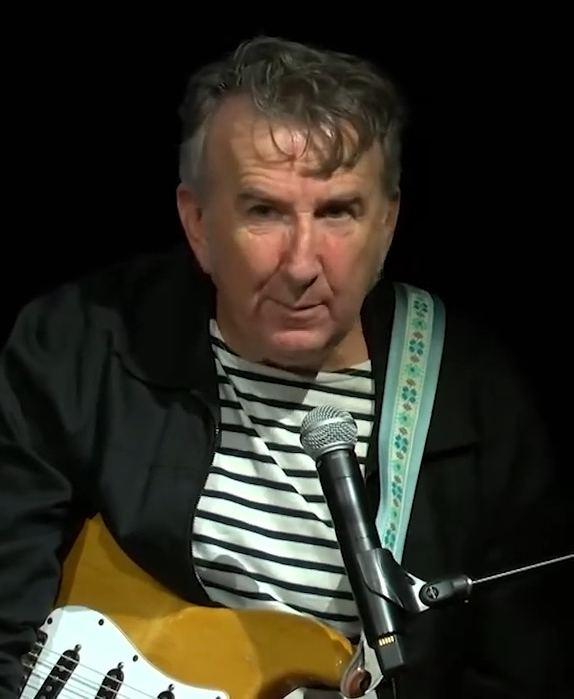
- Willsteed in 2017

Background information
- Born: Terence John Willsteed; Brisbane, Queensland, Australia
- Occupations: Musician, sound designer, lecturer
- Instruments: Bass guitar
- Formerly of: The Go-Betweens

John Willsteed is an Australian musician and sound designer. As a musician, he is best known as a member of the Brisbane band The Go-Betweens, in which he played bass guitar from 1987 to 1989, most notably on the album 16 Lovers Lane. As a sound designer he won Australian Film Institute awards for his work on The Beat Manifesto (1996), Vietnam Nurses (2005, as composer) and Rare Chicken Rescue (2008). He is an adjunct senior lecturer in Music at Queensland University of Technology.

== Early career ==
Terence John Willsteed was born in Brisbane, Australia. In 1978, and with little formal musical training, John became a member of Brisbane feminist punk group Zero (later Xiro and Xero) after a chance meeting with drummer Lindy Morrison and Brisbane visual artist Gary Warner. Willsteed became the bass player, replacing former member Catharine Hunt. He remained a member of the band until 1985. Over this period the name, nature and line-up of Zero changed considerably as the original punk covers band evolved into an avant-pop duo. Xiro released two cassette EPs in 1981 (Religious Wars, Half the Profits), and, as Xero, a 12 inch vinyl EP (Lust in the Dust on MSquared) in 1982. Willsteed was a member of the Brisbane artist collective ZIP, which released four interdisciplinary audio/visual packages between 1982 and 1987. As John-e Xero, Willsteed contributed a number of experimental electronic music works to the ZIP releases. His move to Sydney in 1985 heralded a period of musical expansion. Over the next three years Willsteed played bass in a number of Sydney bands ranging from country (Tender Mercies) to quirky pop (Machines That Walk). It was also in this period that Willsteed contributed to film soundtracks for the first time. His long relationship with Gary Warner, then with the Sydney Super 8 Film Group, drew him into the work of filmmaker Ross Gibson (Camera Natura, Wild, Dead to the World), and he contributed as a musician to the scores of these films and others.

== The Go-Betweens ==
In 1986 the Australian band The Go-Betweens lost their bass player Robert Vickers, moved to Sydney from London, and began searching for a replacement. Willsteed had played with two members – Lindy Morrison in Zero and Amanda Brown in Tender Mercies – and through this social connection was invited to join the band. Almost immediately they went into pre-production for their sixth studio album 16 Lovers Lane. Willsteed's work on this album as both guitarist and bass player has been credited with being an important part of the band's increasing musical sophistication. With 16 Lovers Lane, The Go-Betweens achieved their greatest commercial success to date, both in Australia and internationally. The song 'Streets of Your Town' remains the best known of The Go-Betweens' catalogue. They toured extensively in Australia and overseas in 1988–89 supporting R.E.M. on their Green World Tour. At the end of the tour Willsteed was sacked from the band for unspecified reasons.

== Halfway ==
Willsteed continued to play in Australian bands, including Plug Uglies, The Drunk, The Monk and the Spunk, Disgraceland and The Apartments on their 1992 album Drift, and is currently a member of Halfway. Halfway's 4th album, Any Old Love, was the first with Willsteed. This album achieved numerous accolades including AIR Independent Country Album of the year in 2014 and Queensland Music Awards Song of The Year 2014. He has also contributed to recording projects by The Apartments and Ed Kuepper among others. Halfway's 5th album The Golden Halfway Record, recorded in Nashville with producer Mark Nevers, was released in early 2016, receiving glowing reviews from national press. Their next album, Rain Lover, recorded at QUT in Brisbane and mixed again by Nevers, gathered 5 star reviews, and was described by reviewers as "perfect". In 2021, Halfway collaborated with Aboriginal activist Bob Weatherall and musician William Barton to produce the concept album Restless Dream – a story of repatriation – which was nominated in the 2021 ARIA Awards. Their 9th album, The Styx, also mixed by Mark Nevers in South Carolina, was released in July 2025.

== Film sound design ==
Willsteed studied Sound at the Australian Film, Television and Radio School, graduating in 1996. He moved to Brisbane, and began working professionally as a sound designer for film and television projects. He has worked on a number of Australian features – including Angst and The Rage in Placid Lake – and over 60 television documentaries and short films. Willsteed has also composed music for the children's stop-motion animated television series Kitu and Woofl for Henderson Bowman Productions and ABC TV in 1997. Willsteed has won three Australian Film Institute Awards for Sound Design (Vietnam Nurses, The Beat Manifesto and Rare Chicken Rescue). He has also been nominated for two IF Awards (Angst, The Rage in Placid Lake) and is the recipient of the International Wildlife Film Festival Sound Award (for Hypsi, the Forest Gardener).

== Academic work ==
Willsteed began teaching in the tertiary system in 2000 at Griffith University in Brisbane, and has since taught at Bond, SBIT, and a number of private schools. He is an adjunct senior lecturer at Queensland University of Technology in the Music Discipline, after his retirement in 2023. His PhD, It's Not the Heat, It's the Humidity, is an exploration of the presentation of cultural history with an emphasis on Brisbane's punk and post-punk music scene. He has written for The Conversation on music and other related topics, and co-edited Electronic Cities in 2020 as well as Underground Music Cultures and Music-making in LA in 2024, both for Palgrave Macmillan. In the start of 2024, Willsteed and Robert Forster curated and wrote essays for Nowhere Fast: Punk and Post-Punk Brisbane 1978–1982, a book of photographs by Paul O'Brien, published by AndAlso Books.

In 2016, Willsteed won the Letty Katts Award and held a presentation at the State Library of Queensland on the role of posters in the Brisbane music scene from 1975 to 1995. In 2024 he was the recipient of the John Oxley Library Fellowship at State Library of Queensland for his oral history project Dive For Your Memory.
