= Streets of Your Town =

- The cover present on the Australian release

Single by the Go-Betweens

from the album 16 Lovers Lane
- B-side: "Wait Until June"
- Released: July 1988
- Length: 3:34
- Label: Beggars Banquet
- Songwriter: Grant McLennan
- Producer: Mark Wallis

The Go-Betweens singles chronology
"Bye Bye Pride" (1987)	"Streets of Your Town" (1988)	"Was There Anything I Could Do?" (1988)

"Streets of Your Town" is a song by Australian indie group the Go-Betweens that was released as the lead single from their 1988 album 16 Lovers Lane. Featuring polished production, a prominent backing vocal by Amanda Brown and a guitar solo by bassist John Willsteed, "Streets of Your Town" is one of the band's most recognised songs. It was released in July 1988 in the UK on Beggars Banquet, where it reached No. 80 on the singles charts and in Australia in August 1988 on Mushroom, where it reached No. 68. In New Zealand, the song was issued in November 1988, and was a top 40 hit, peaking at No. 30—the band's highest-ever placing on any national chart.

The single was re-released in the UK in 1989, in an attempt by Beggars Banquet to encourage the band's commercial momentum. However, it only peaked at No. 82.

== Composition and recording ==
Written by Grant McLennan, the sunny, upbeat music is contrasted with darker lyrics: "Don't the sun look good today but the rain is on its way, watch the butcher shine his knives, and this town is full of battered wives". McLennan said of writing the song, "I was listening to 'Under the Milky Way' and I was just working it out–cause I'm a big fan of the Church. And that afternoon I came up with a chord progression and a chorus." The song was written in McLennan and Amanda Brown's apartment in Bondi. Brown said, "It was written in, I would say, 10 minutes. I was singing along and I sung that 'shine' line, which is like the call and response answer in the verses. And I don't collect any songwriting royalties for that song, because that was a condition of my joining the band."

McLennan had not played the song to the band's co-founder Robert Forster before entering the studio. "It remains an odd fact – the one Go-Betweens song Grant and I never played before recording," Forster wrote. Lindy Morrison said, "We were in a park in Glebe when Amanda and Grant played the song to us for the first time, and I guess I was hearing it through Robert's reaction, because Robert was so shocked. So I was feeling his pain, but that didn't mean I couldn't see how magnificent that song was."

John Willsteed played the "gorgeous Spanish-inflected acoustic guitar solo" on a nylon-stringed classical guitar that belonged to Brown. The band were unable to replicate it live where Willsteed played bass. Forster noted, "It was much more of a studio construction, and maybe the best version of it ever is on the album."

Forster later said, "This was obviously the most commercial thing we'd ever done, and it came out around October '88, which caught the summer here. It was re-released in summer and it sat fantastically on Australian summer radio and then it sat well on English summer radio. We were walking around Soho and we'd hear it on the radio, every jean shop and café. It was on Radio 1 and so we were hearing it as we were walking around."

== Video ==
A shot from the music video, showing the Brisbane City Hall in front of blue sky.

There were two video clips filmed to promote the song. One, directed by Paul Goldman and filmed in black-and-white which is included on the CD remaster, featuring footage of the band performing the song, of the town of Rainbow, Victoria and of the Melbourne suburb of Yarraville, Victoria. The other, more often played videoclip, directed by Kriv Stenders, mixes evocative city images of Brisbane, Sydney and Melbourne. The Guardian describes it as, "slabs of bright blue sky behind terrace houses, telephone lines, clock towers, apartment blocks and train stations. There are glimpses of the Sydney Harbour Bridge, overhead tram lines in Melbourne and buildings in central Brisbane. And lots of sun glittering on water."

== Reception ==
Reviewed at the time of release, Melody Maker said, "More skilled story telling. As ever. The Go-Betweens tell a tall, and a small, tale well. The Go-Betweens are fine, basically, for their sense of understatement and this knack they have of translating a resigned shrug to music. Very occasionally, they're great." Maura Johnston wrote for NPR, "The shimmering "Streets of Your Town", a saudade-infused saunter that's highlighted by Brown's sun-dappled backing vocal, is an especially summery offering."

Andrew Stafford wrote in the Griffith Review that the song, "was one of McLennan's simplest and most direct songs. The song's circular chorus captures suburban humdrum with effortless ease – recognising that mundanity and the comforts of home often go hand in hand – and although it's open-ended enough that anyone could hum it in any city in the world, it's not hard to recognise Brisbane."

In January 2018, as part of Triple M's "Ozzest 100", the 'most Australian' songs of all time, "Streets of Your Town" was ranked number 100. In 2025, the song placed 84 on the Triple J's Hottest 100 of Australian Songs.

== Other versions ==
Lines from the song were included by U2 when they played "Elevation" and "With or Without You" on the opening of the Pacific leg of their Vertigo World Tour in Brisbane, in dedication to McLennan. The song was also played after the band's second encore. The opening guitar chords from the song are sampled on "Just the Way You Are" by Italian dance production group Milky. The song debuted at number one on the Billboard Hot Dance Airplay chart in October 2003.

This song was used as the theme song for Prime Television in Australia in 2001–2002 and for television advertisements for The Courier Mail in 2006/2007, though in both cases the song was edited so that the darker lyrics were omitted. The song was also featured in the 2008 Australian/British AFI award–winning drama-based feature film The Black Balloon.

== Track listing ==
=== 7" Vinyl ===
1. "Streets of Your Town" – 3:34
2. "Wait Until June" – 3:05

=== 12" Vinyl and CD single ===
1. "Streets of Your Town" – 3:34
2. "Spring Rain" – 3:06
3. "Right Here" – 3:53
4. "Wait Until June" – 3:05

=== 7" Vinyl ===
1. "Streets of Your Town" – 3:34
2. "Quiet Heart" – 5:20

=== 12" Vinyl and mini CD single ===
1. "Streets of Your Town" – 3:34
2. "Quiet Heart" – 5:20
3. "Bow Down" – 3:45
4. "The House that Jack Kerouac Built (Remix)" – 4:46

=== CD single ===
1. "Streets of Your Town" – 3:34
2. "Spring Rain" – 3:06
3. "Right Here" – 3:53
4. "Wait Until June" – 3:05

== Charts ==
Chart (1988)	Peak position
Australian Singles Chart	68
New Zealand Singles Chart	30
UK Singles Chart	80
Chart (1989)	Peak position
UK Singles Chart	82

== Release history ==
Region	Date	Label	Format	Catalogue
United Kingdom	July 1988	Beggars Banquet	7" vinyl	BEG 218
United Kingdom	July 1988	Beggars Banquet	12" vinyl	BEG 218T
United Kingdom	July 1988	Beggars Banquet	CD single	BEG 218CD
United Kingdom	May 1989	Beggars Banquet	7" vinyl	BEG 232
United Kingdom	May 1989	Beggars Banquet	12" vinyl	BEG 232T
United Kingdom	May 1989	Beggars Banquet	CD single	BEG 232CD
Australia	29 August 1988	Mushroom	7" vinyl	K607
Spain	1988	Victoria	12" vinyl	VIC 349
Germany	1988	Rebel	CD single	SPV 55-3017
United States	1989	Capitol	12" vinyl	SPRO-79547
