= The Apartments =

Australian indie band

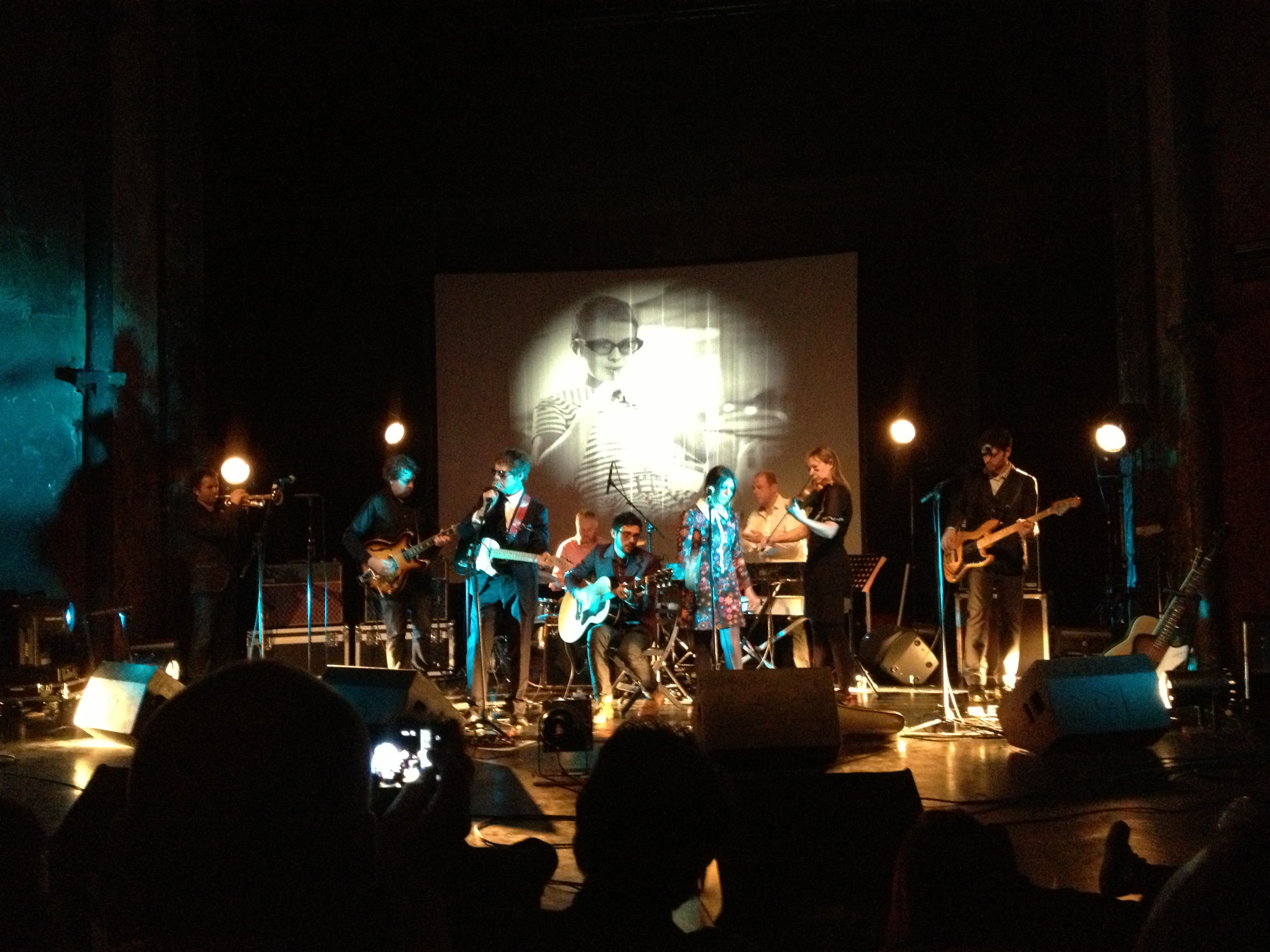
- The Apartments December 2013 in Paris

Background information
- Origin: Brisbane, Queensland, Australia
- Genres: Indie rock, jangle pop, chamber pop
- Years active: 1978–1979, 1984–present (with several periods of inactivity)
- Labels: Riley, Microcultures, Talitres, Able Label, Hot, Rough Trade, Glass, New Rose
- Members: Peter Milton Walsh
- Past members: Michael O'Connell; Peter Martin; Peter Whitby; Judy Anderson; Jurgen Hobbs; Nick Allum; Greg Atkinson; George Bibicos; Amanda Brown; Miroslav Bukovsky; Antoine Chaperon; Wayne Connolly; Jeff Crawley; Eliot Fish; Ken Gormley; Gene Maynard; Natasha Penot; Tim Kevin; John Willsteed
- Website: www.theapartments-music.com

The Apartments are an Australian indie band formed in 1978 in Brisbane, Queensland. The band split up in 1979 but reformed in 1984 and continued until 1997, with a new version of the band forming in 2007. Based in Sydney, New South Wales, the band has continued to perform and record, with the ninth album and most recent release, In and Out of the Light released in September 2020. Peter Milton Walsh is the band's only constant member.

== History ==
=== Early Apartments and Brisbane connections (1978-1980) ===
The Apartments first came together in Brisbane in 1978 with Walsh (guitar, vocals), Michael O'Connell (guitar, vocals), Peter Whitby (bass, vocals) and Peter Martin (drums). The band's name derives from Billy Wilder's 1960 film The Apartment.

While in The Apartments, Walsh briefly joined The Go-Betweens as guitarist when they were offered an 8-album contract by Beserkley Records. During an interview at the time, Robert Forster and Grant McLennan spoke about Walsh and the "variety of personalities and image" in the Go-Betweens. McLennan said "Walsh is night" and Forster "We are day" with McLennan adding "We’re sun, he’s rain." Four years after Grant McLennan's death, Walsh wrote about this period and his friendship with The Go-Betweens in a piece entitled "Who will remember your tunes?"

When the Beserkley deal fell through, Walsh returned to The Apartments and The Go-Betweens resumed as a three-piece. The Go-Betweens affectionately commemorated Walsh's style and his time with them on the B side of their next single, "Don't Let Him Come Back": "Here he comes, with his twelve o’clock junk…who’s that dressed in black? Who’s that in his apartment?"

The Apartments' first EP The Return of the Hypnotist was recorded for The Go-Betweens' Able Label in May, 1979. The Apartments broke up in October 1979 when Walsh left Brisbane. The Return of the Hypnotist EP was released the same month.

=== Out of Nowhere and New York (1981–1983) ===
In 1981, Walsh next formed a four-piece Out of Nowhere (Walsh, guitar/vocals, Gary Warner, soprano saxophone, Tony Forde, clarinet and Graeme Hutchinson, drums) and recorded The Arrangements a cassette-only release with Pink and Blue, a duet of artists Jenny Watson and John Nixon, then curator of the Institute of Modern Art. After a string of shows around Brisbane during their first year, the band relocated to Sydney in 1982, adding Joe Borkowski on bass and Jeffrey Wegener of the Laughing Clowns replacing Hutchinson on drums. This incarnation of the band recorded Out of Nowhere's first and only single for Ed Kuepper's Prince Melon label "No Resistance"/"Remember, Remember".

In early 1982, Walsh moved to New York City following an invitation from future Go-Between, Robert Vickers, to join The Colors as guitarist. The Colors split up within months of Walsh joining the band and Walsh remained in New York. A number of songs written during these years would later appear on the first Apartments album The Evening Visits And Stays For Years.

Walsh was then asked by Ed Kuepper to play bass in his band Laughing Clowns. Walsh toured England, Europe and Australia extensively with the Laughing Clowns and also recorded the Law of Nature album and the single "Eternally Yours".

=== The Apartments reformed (1984-1985) ===
A year later Walsh returned to Australia and reformed the Apartments with a line-up including ex-Out of Nowhere members, Gary Warner (piano), Joseph Borkowski (bass) and Graeme Beavis (guitar), and Bruce Carrick (drums). The band then recorded one of the set of New York songs as a single, "All You Wanted" (with ex-Out of Nowhere member Gary Warner on piano), (b/w "Fever Elsewhere"). Early in 1985 The Apartments recorded demos for a proposed debut album.

In June 1985, Rough Trade records signed The Apartments on the basis of the demos recorded earlier in the year. Walsh then moved to London and the Apartments' first album, The Evening Visits...and Stays for Years was released by Rough Trade Records in 1985. The Apartments were joined by guest musicians Clare Kenny (formerly of Orange Juice, bass, vocals), Ben Watt of Everything but the Girl, and Graham Lee of The Triffids. Reviewing The Evening Visits... for the NME, critic Jane Wilkes wrote "after whetting our appetites with last year's classic import single 'All You Wanted' The Apartments have stunned us to a reverential silence. This album is a pure heart-wrencher, and should only be listened to after dark." French music critic and biographer of Serge Gainsbourg, Bayon, writing in Libération, drew favourable comparisons to a diverse range of musicians, both contemporary (Cocteau Twins, Felt, Nick Cave) and preceding (Nick Drake, Bob Dylan, Alex Chilton). The Evening Visits... subsequently appeared in the NME's 1985 'Albums of the Year' end of year critic list and became a cult hit in France.

"All You Wanted" was reissued by Rough Trade, the single reaching no. 29 on the UK Independent Chart in 1986.

Following an English tour with Everything but the Girl, a new line-up emerged that included Jurgen Hobbs (bass), Judy Anderson (piano, organ) and Nick Allum (drums). This incarnation of the band played shows in the UK and Europe and released a single, "The Shyest Time", in 1988. "The Shyest Time" was featured on the soundtrack of John Hughes' movie Some Kind of Wonderful. Subsequent litigation between The Apartments and Hughes' production company over recording prevented the Apartments from releasing new material for nearly 18 months.

=== Australia and France (1989-1999) ===
With Rough Trade in receivership as the Eighties ended, Walsh left England for Australia. He continued writing and occasional performances as a duet with Amanda Brown of The Go Betweens and as the Apartments with Ed Kuepper. Recordings of both were extensively bootlegged.

In 1993, The Apartments recorded Drift, the first Apartments album released in Australia, on Melbourne label Torn & Frayed. Drift was next released in France on New Rose. The album (like its predecessor) achieved high praise in France, with Les Inrockuptibles placing Drift at no. 19 in their end of year list in 1993 and 7th place in the readers' list. Due to its popularity in France, the album was re-released and remastered through French indie label Talitres in 2010.

A tour of France followed in 1994 with The Apartments consisting of Walsh, two members of Big Heavy Stuff — Eliot Fish (bass, vocals) and Greg Atkinson (guitar, vocals) — and Nick Allum on drums.

The Apartments then recorded three more albums in quick succession: A Life Full of Farewells (1995), the acoustic Fête Foraine (1996), and Apart (1997). Rolling Stone reviewer Rob O'Connor described A Life Full of Farewells as "the sort of ornate pop record one usually associates with big-budget psychedelia or overstudied Anglo pop. For the most part, Walsh's songs enable listeners to enjoy time spent in places we would usually rather not be." Mojo said "Taken together, 1985's The Evening Visits..., 1993's Drift and 1995's A Life Full of Farewells constitute the finest, most distinguished catalogue I've heard in the past decade or so."

On the final day of mixing and recording apart Walsh was informed that his young son had been diagnosed with a life-threatening illness. After this, Walsh suspended writing and touring for the Apartments to devote his attention to his son, who died two years later in September 1999. Walsh later described his reasons for not resuming his musical career after his son's death. "I just wanted nothing to do with anything that didn't have him in it. I felt like I had been given every chance of happiness and he got none. I felt entitled to nothing."

=== Cover versions of Apartments songs ===
The song "Mr Somewhere" was covered by This Mortal Coil in their 1991 album Blood. Other covers include Ed Kuepper's reading of "Places Where The Night Is Long" on his 1995 album, Exotic Mail Order Moods and "Knowing You Were Loved" by Renée Geyer in 1999 on her Sweet Life album.

=== 2007 reformation ===
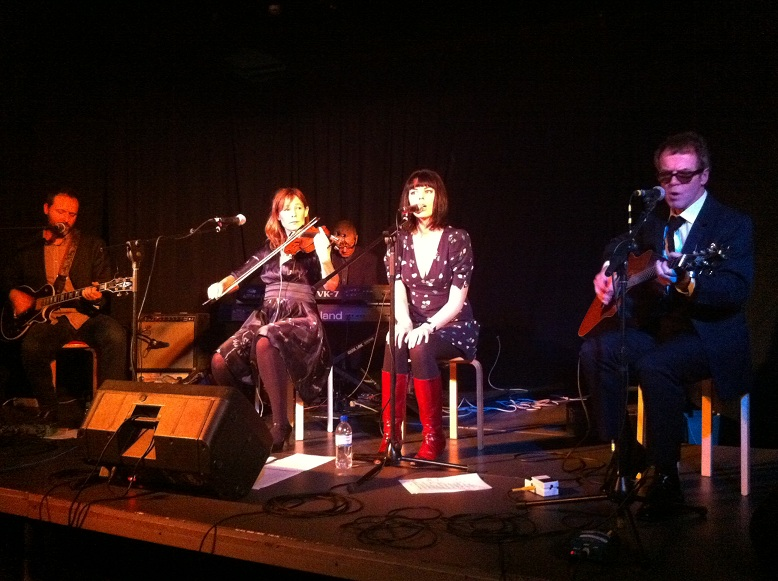
Performing in Sydney, December 2011

In 2007, encouraged by John Willsteed, bass player on Drift, Walsh was convinced briefly to perform again and the Apartments (Walsh, Eliot Fish, Willsteed, Jeff Crawley, George Bibicos and Gene Maynard (drums)) played the Pig City Festival at the University of Queensland in Brisbane. Walsh then agreed to shows in Sydney, Brisbane and Melbourne.

Walsh played three shows in France in November 2009. Walsh played with Fish (with two French musicians on some songs) in Chinon, Paris (L'Européen) and Clermont-Ferrand. The Apartments were supported by French band 49 Swimming Pools, who, as fans of The Apartments, organised the tour.

A French tour for 2012 (It's Not Our World Anymore) was announced via French crowdfunding site Ulule. A series of shows took place in November and December, in art galleries and boutiques in Paris and La Rochelle and in regular music venues in Paris (Bouffes du Nord), Bordeaux, Clermont-Ferrand, Nantes, and Allonnes. Walsh played with Amanda Brown, Nick Allum (from the Fatima Mansions), Wayne Connolly (of Knievel), Fabien Tessier and Samuel Léger (of 49 Swimming Pools) and Gaël Riteau. The tour featured the use of photos of Jean Seberg taken on the set of the film À Bout de Souffle by Raymond Cauchetier. In collaboration with Parisian graphic designer Pascal Blua, Cauchetier personally approved Walsh's use of his images, some never before published, as stage backdrops and in promotional material for the tour.

During the 2012 It's Not Our World Anymore tour, the Apartments recorded a live session for the Label Pop radio programme on Radio France. This was later released by French label Talitres as a limited edition vinyl LP of 500 copies for Disquaire Day (Record Store Day), Seven Songs, on 20 April 2013.

A double CD/LP/Cassette reissue of the Apartments debut album The Evening Visits... and Stays for Years, including rarities and demos, was released on 31 March 2015 by Brooklyn record label Captured Tracks. It covers the first seven years of material including the tracks from the first EP The Return of the Hypnotist. Also included are liner notes by Walsh, Steven Schayer (ex-The Chills) and Robert Forster from the Go-Betweens.

=== No Song, No Spell, No Madrigal ===
In October 2013 Walsh began recording a new Apartments album in Sydney, Australia, at Alberts Studio with Wayne Connolly as producer. This album, No Song, No Spell, No Madrigal, was released by French label Microcultures in April 2015. The album was recorded with Apartments players Eliot Fish, Amanda Brown, Gene Maynard, Wayne Connolly, and various guests. Nick Allum recorded additional percussion and drums at Press Play Studios in London while French collaborators Natasha Penot and Antoine Chaperon from Grisbi recorded vocals and other instruments in their home studio in France. Natasha Penot features on the duet "Black Ribbons", which was originally released by Chapter Music in 2011 as a single with a Spring mix by Grisbi and an Autumn mix by John Willsteed. The NSNSNM recording of "Black Ribbons" features additional backing vocals as well as flugelhorn by Miroslav Bukovsky. Artwork for the album was done by Pascal Blua and 50 copies of limited edition handwritten lyrics were made available through Microcultures during the pre-order stage.

The first single taken from the album, "Twenty One", was released in January 2015. The Apartments toured France in September 2015.

Lyonel Sasso in French based Magic Revue Pop Moderne wrote "...This album is like our favorite season, a sky full of promises and memories. The choirs of September Skies resound as loudly as the heart racing - a simple joy. Walsh is like Ulysses, returning from his odyssey and his miracles. He continues to play the same pop music, regardless of the time spent, deadlines, contracts, money and disappointment." Uncut magazine awarded the album 9/10, with Jon Dale writing "...Played with quiet grace, the eight chamber-pop songs here are alternatively harrowing and redemptive, anchored by loss." In Australia, Noel Mengel said "Loss courses through these songs like blood through the veins...Just eight songs, less than 40 minutes of music. But what songs. It’s perfect just as it is."

While in Tours, France a video for "Please Don't Say Remember" was made by US Director Paul Harrill.

At year's end, French music magazine Magic named No Song, No Spell, No Madrigal no. 1 album of the year, a position never before achieved by an Australian artist. In Australia, ABC Radio National's music show, Inside Sleeve, named "Twenty One" the no. 1 song of 2015. In the US, ex-Mojo editor Dave DiMartino made the album his no. 1 in his albums of the year list, saying "The first album of new material in years from Australian Peter Milton Walsh of the Apartments is fantastic, emotionally profound, and maybe the most moving collection of songs I've heard in years. Untouchably great."

In September 2016, Riley Records released No Song, No Spell, No Madrigal in Australia and New Zealand. This release includes two exclusive bonus tracks recorded following the April French Tour, "Nobody Like You", and an acoustic version of "Swap Places", featuring the tour trio. A video for the acoustic version of "Swap Places" was also released in September and features the photography of Jérôme Sevrette. In December 2016, Netherlands based label Brandy Alexander released No Song, No Spell, No Madrigal.

=== Touring ===
The Apartments toured France in 2015 with a full band including French (Penot, Chaperon, Tessier, Riteau), English (Allum) and Australian players (Fish and Walsh) to promote the release of No Song, No Spell, No Madrigal.

On New Year's Day 2016 the Apartments played a headline show as part of the Andy Warhol/Weiwei exhibition at the National Gallery of Victoria. The Apartments then played a sold-out show in the Speigeltent at the Sydney Festival in January 2016.

In April 2016 The Apartments undertook a nine-show Three for the Road French tour as a trio with Antoine Chaperon, Natasha Penot and Walsh, playing Chartres, Saint-Lô, Lille, Paris, Amiens, Beaumont, Hyères, Grenoble, and Lyon. Jim Yamouridis, Seb Martel and Fabrice Fabrice Barré supported The Apartments for part of the tour. In July 2016 The Apartments, including Brown, Connolly, Fish, Miro Bukovsky, Clare Moore, and Walsh, played a headline show as part of 'Monet's Garden: The Musée Marmottan Monet, Paris' at the National Gallery of Victoria.

During 2017 and 2018 The Apartments / Peter Milton Walsh focused on playing locally in Australia with shows in Sydney and Brisbane before Peter Milton Walsh based himself in the south of France for three months.

The 2018 residency in France allowed extensive touring in France, along with shows in London, Rotterdam, Cologne and Lausanne. For these shows, The Apartments consisted of Peter Milton Walsh with long term French collaborators Natasha Penot and Antoine Chaperon.

On 11 December 2021, The Apartments played The Great Club in Marrickville. Support was Lindy Morrison and Rob Snarski playing as a duo.

The Apartments toured France in March 2022 with Allum, Chaperon and Penot. Eliot Fish was replaced by Michael Hiscock of The Field Mice.

=== New album releases, re-releases and guest appearance ===
Walsh is guest vocalist on "Attention to Life", a track on Piano Magic's final album, Closure, released by Second Language Music on 20 January 2017. The album also features guest appearances by Audrey Riley, cellist on The Apartments first album.

In January 2017, Brisbane label LCMR released a limited edition of 300 copies of The Apartments' first EP.

In 2017 The Apartments released two albums from their back catalogue and for both it was the first time in vinyl and releases were limited to 1,000 copies each.

Talitres and Riley Records released drift in September and Microcultures and Riley Records released fête foraine in November. The albums were reviewed together by Uncut in March 2018. drift was rated 7/10 and Jon Dale wrote the album is "...full of transit, a series of set pieces for urban anomie and romantic collapse...", while fête foraine received a 9/10 rating.

The band's show from September 2015 at the L'Ubu club in Rennes, featuring Allum, Chaperon, Fish, Riteau, Tessier, Penot was recorded by French television, and the performance was released on the Live at L'Ubu double vinyl album on Record Store Day, 13 April 2019.

In September 2020 Talitres released a new album, In and Out of the Light

The Apartments' tenth album, That's What the Music is For, was released on the 17 October 2025. Two singles from the album were released prior to the album release, both with accompanying videos by Nick Langley.

== Discography ==
=== Albums ===
Title	Release date	Label	Notes
the evening visits...and stays for years	1985	Rough Trade/Virgin France S.A.	Reissued in 2015 by Captured Tracks
drift	1992	New Rose/Torn & Frayed	Reissued 2011, 2017 by Talitres, Riley Records
A Life Full of Farewells	1995	Hot	
fête foraine	1996	Hot	Reissued 2017 by Microcultures + Riley Records
apart	1997	Hot	
Seven Songs	2013	Talitres	2013 Disquaire Day / Record Store Day Release
No Song, No Spell, No Madrigal	2015	Microcultures/Riley Records	Issued in 2016 in Australia by Riley Records with bonus tracks
Live at L'Ubu	2019	Talitres/Riley Records	2019 Disquaire Day / Record Store Day Release
In And Out of the Light	2020	Talitres	
seven songs	2022	Talitres/Riley Records	Vinyl re-issue
apart	2023	Talitres/Riley Records	Vinyl re-issue
That's What the Music is For	2025	Talitres/Riley Records	

=== Singles, EPs ===
Title	Format	Release date	Label	Notes	UK Independent Chart
the return of the hypnotist	7-inch EP	1979	Able Label	Reissued 2017	
"All You Wanted"	7-inch	1984	Hot		
"All You Wanted"	7-/12-inch	1985	Rough Trade		29
"The Shyest Time"	7-inch	1987	MCA	Split single with Flesh For Lulu	
"The Shyest Time"	7-/12-inch	1988	Glass		
Sunset Hotel	CD EP	1994	New Rose		
Life	CD EP	1995	Hot		
"Part"	CD	1997	Hot		
"Black Ribbons"	7-inch	2011	Riley Records/Chapter Music		
"Pocketful of Sunshine"	Digital	2020	Riley Records/Talitres		
"What's Beauty To Do?"	Digital	2020	Riley Records/Talitres		
"A Handful of Tomorrow"	Digital	2025	Riley Records/Talitres		
"Death Would Be My Best Career Move"	Digital	2025	Riley Records/Talitres		

=== Compilation tracks ===
- Some Kind of Wonderful Soundtrack (1987), MCA: "The Shyest Time"
- POPvolume#1 (1999), POPnews: "Knowing You Were Loved"
- Behind the Banana Curtain – a collection of 41 Brisbane bands (2000), 4ZZZ: "Help"
- Can’t Stop It! Australian Post-Punk 1978-82 (2005) Chapter: "Help"
- Inner City Soundtrack (2005) Laughing Outlaw: "All You Wanted"
