= Send Me a Lullaby =

Studio album by the Go-Betweens
- Released: November 1981 (AUS); February 1982 (UK)
- Recorded: July 1981
- Studio: Richmond Recorders (Melbourne, Australia)
- Genre: Rock, alternative rock, indie rock
- Length: 35:37
- Label: Missing Link (AUS); Rough Trade (UK)
- Producer: The Go-Betweens, Tony Cohen

The Go-Betweens chronology
Send Me a Lullaby (1981)	Before Hollywood (1983)

Singles from Send Me a Lullaby
- 1. "Your Turn, My Turn" Released: July 1981

Professional ratings
Review scores
Source	Rating
AllMusic	2.5/5 stars
The Rolling Stone Album Guide	2.5/5 stars

Send Me a Lullaby is the Go-Betweens' debut album. It was released in November 1981 in Australia on Missing Link as an eight-track mini-album. It was subsequently released in the UK on Rough Trade Records, an independent record label (Missing Link's UK distributors), in February 1982 as a 12-track album.

== Details ==
The album was recorded at the Richmond Recorders studio in Melbourne in July 1981. It was engineered and produced by Tony Cohen (the Birthday Party), together with the Go-Betweens. Robert Forster said that Cohen, although having a signature sound, lacked a producer's instinct and the band had to "choose their own songs and arrange them themselves," resulting in many older songs being jettisoned from the album. Cohen later said, "A band as different as the Go-Betweens threw me, and it took a while to catch up." Lindy Morrison said, "Tony was really bemused by me. He didn't know how to cope with my lack of skills and flitted around me like I was the witch from Macbeth.

Grant McLennan later said, "Send Me A Lullaby is to me an inauspicious debut. It's a record that I think if I'd heard - well, it's hard for me to say that, but if I'd heard that and I wasn't in the band, I think my comment would have been 'What the fuck is going on here.' There's great melodies but then there's changes which to this day I can't work out. There's lyrics to this day which I don't understand and when I actually summon up enough courage to get to the microphone, I sound like a choirboy with a mouthful of fruitcake." Forster agreed, saying, "So, no classic first album. But a band has to keep thinking they are writing their own story. This was our way."

Morrison said her drumming on the album had been affected by the experimentation with her previous band Xero. "The trouble was, it had become part of me to do silly things, which is why my drumming is idiosyncratic with the Go-Betweens in many ways. On Send Me A Lullaby there are lots of strange drumbeats, things that a normal drummer wouldn't play," she said.

Melbourne artist Jenny Watson painted the cover of the album. The portraits were later purchased by the Australian National Portrait Gallery. Forster claimed, "She got the three of us with precision, placing us on the album with the touch of a master psychologist." The inner gatefold had pictures of Forster and McLennan's apartments.

In 2002, Circus Records released an expanded CD which included a second disc of twelve bonus tracks of songs recorded by the Go-Betweens around the same time as the album together with a music video for the song, "Your Turn, My Turn".

== Reception ==
Reviewed in Australian Rolling Stone at the time of release, it was described as reflecting "the progression from folky naivety of the early songs to a more involved, complex set of emotions, though understatement is still a key feature." The reviewer noted it is an album with "no, or at least very few, overdubs," and said, "the band have produced a fresh, uncluttered sound that has a live presence to it." The review concluded by saying, "everything's come together just fine."

NME described the album as "a record of tremendous depth, a mystery to be fathomed." Noting the album's naivety, clumsiness, intelligence, and frailty, the reviewer notes, "Maybe I'm forgetting, but this seems the least fussy, least pompous, most natural and moving music I've yet heard from their part of the planet." Smash Hits called it, "a set of unpolished but appealing songs. Their slight gawkiness would probably be scorned if they were British."

== Track listing ==
Send Me a Lullaby (original Australian issue)
No.	Title	Writer(s)	Length
1.	"One Thing Can Hold Us"	Grant McLennan	3:17
2.	"People Know" (vocals by Lindy Morrison)	Robert Forster	2:11
3.	"Midnight to Neon"	Robert Forster, Grant McLennan	2:31
4.	"Careless" (lead guitar – Grant McLennan)	Robert Forster	2:34
5.	"All About Strength" (lead guitar – Grant McLennan)	Grant McLennan	2:12
6.	"Ride"	Robert Forster	3:30
7.	"Hold Your Horses"	Grant McLennan	2:14
8.	"It Could Be Anyone" (lead guitar – Grant McLennan)	Grant McLennan	4:30

UK issue
No.	Title	Writer(s)	Length
1.	"Your Turn, My Turn"	Grant McLennan	3:03
2.	"One Thing Can Hold Us"	Grant McLennan	3:17
3.	"People Know" (vocals by Lindy Morrison)	Robert Forster	2:11
4.	"The Girls Have Moved"	Robert Forster	2:36
5.	"Midnight to Neon"	Robert Forster	2:31
6.	"Eight Pictures"	Robert Forster	4:52
7.	"Careless" (lead guitar – Grant McLennan)	Robert Forster	2:34
8.	"All About Strength" (lead guitar – Grant McLennan)	Grant McLennan	2:12
9.	"Ride"	Robert Forster	3:30
10.	"Hold Your Horses"	Grant McLennan	2:14
11.	"Arrow in a Bow"	Robert Forster	2:00
12.	"It Could Be Anyone" (lead guitar – Grant McLennan)	Grant McLennan	4:30

2002 bonus disc
No.	Title	Writer(s)	Length
1.	"Sunday Night"	Robert Forster	2:50
2.	"One Word"	Grant McLennan	2:02
3.	"I Need Two Heads"	Robert Forster	2:34
4.	"The Clowns Are in Town"	Robert Forster	2:14
5.	"Serenade Sound"	Grant McLennan	2:23
6.	"Hope"	Robert Forster	2:04
7.	"Stop Before You Say It"	Robert Forster	1:42
8.	"World Weary"	Robert Forster	1:41
9.	"Distant Hands"	Robert Forster	2:01
10.	"Undo What You Did"	Robert Forster	4:05
11.	"Cracked Wheat"	Robert Forster	3:54
12.	"After the Fireworks"	Robert Forster, Grant McLennan, Nick Cave, Lindy Morrison	6:59
13.	"Your Turn, My Turn" (Video)		4:29

== Personnel ==
The Go-Betweens

- Robert Forster – vocals, rhythm guitar
- Grant McLennan – vocals, bass guitar, lead guitar
- Lindy Morrison – drums, vocals

Additional personnel

- Nick Cave – vocals on "After the Fireworks"
- Steve Daly – drums on "I Need Two Heads" and "Stop Before You Say It"
- James Freud – saxophone
- Mick Harvey – piano on "After the Fireworks"
- Rowland S. Howard – guitar on "After the Fireworks"
- Dan Wallace-Crabbe – piano on "World Weary"
