= Amanda Brown (musician) =

Australian musician

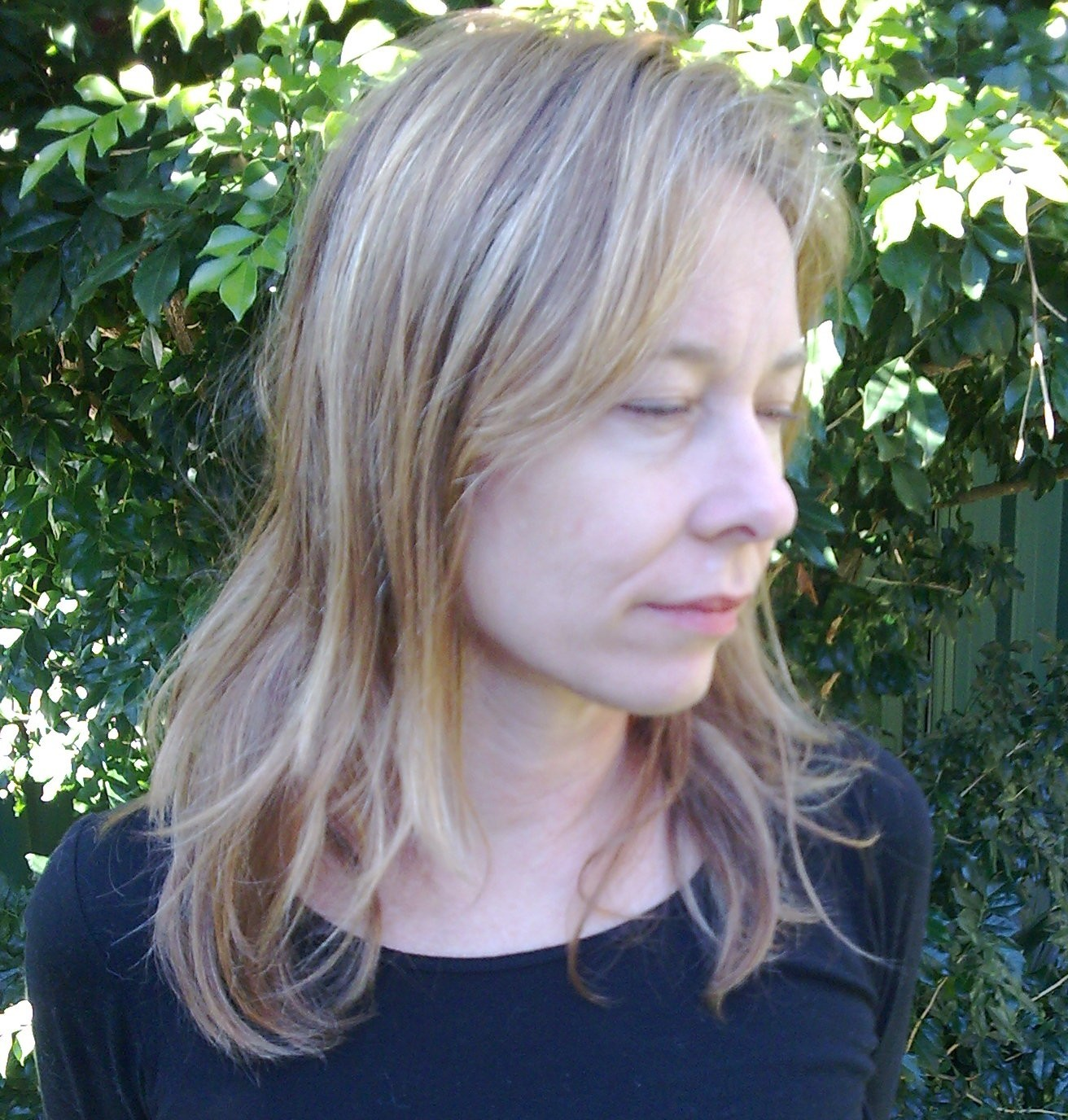

Background information
- Born: Amanda Gabrielle Brown; 17 November 1965 (age 60); Sydney, New South Wales, Australia
- Genres: Rock; soundtrack
- Occupations: Musician; singer; songwriter
- Instruments: Violin; oboe; guitar; keyboards; bass guitar; mandolin; autoharp; vocals
- Years active: 1978–present
- Labels: Vitamin; Fuse/Think; Polydor; rooART; EMI; Capitol; Beggars Banquet
- Website: amandabrowncomposer.com

Amanda Gabrielle Brown (born 17 November 1965) is an Australian composer, multi-instrumentalist, singer and songwriter. She was the violinist of Australian indie rock band the Go-Betweens from 1986 to 1989 and recorded on their studio albums Tallulah (1987) and 16 Lovers Lane (1988). Brown has also worked as a session musician and, since 2000, as a screen music composer. She won the AACTA Award for Best Original Music Score in 2020 for Babyteeth (2019) and also Best Original Music Score in a Documentary for Brazen Hussies (2020). At the APRA-AGSC Screen Music Awards of 2009 she won Best Music for a Documentary for Sidney Nolan: Mask and Memory (2008) and Best Music for a Television Series or Serial for The Secrets She Keeps at the 2020 ceremony.

== Early life and education ==
Amanda Gabrielle Brown was born on 17 November 1965. For secondary education she attended Sydney Girls High School where she took violin lessons. She received training in classical ballet. She started a course in archaeology and ancient history at the University of Sydney but left before completion to pursue her music career. Brown is a graduate of the Sydney Conservatorium of Music (1995), University of Western Sydney (BMus, 1997) and Australian Film Television and Radio School (Screen Composition, 2000).

== Career ==
=== 1980s ===
From 1983 Brown on violin, oboe and vocals was a member of jazz rock group Climbing Frame in Sydney, which issued a self-titled five-track extended play in 1984. Other members were Peter Brookes on drums, David Hawkes on clarinet and acoustic guitar, Neil Hawkes on saxophone, Michael Sherman on keyboards and trumpet, Barry Wolifson on oboe and Jon Wright on bass and electric guitar. Brown's other early bands during the 1980s were Tender Mercies (with John Willsteed and Michael O'Connell) and Blood Brothers (with O'Connell), in which she played violin, oboe, guitar and keyboards.

By March 1986 Brown had joined Australian indie rock group the Go-Betweens for Australian tour dates after being discovered playing live in a café. The group had formed in Brisbane in 1977 and in 1986 they comprised Robert Forster on lead vocals and guitar, Grant McLennan on lead vocals, guitar and harmonica, Lindy Morrison on drums and backing vocals and Robert Vickers on bass guitar. The group had signed a new recording contract with Beggars Banquet. Later that year Brown officially joined the band, which was then based in London, to provide backing vocals, violin, oboe, guitar, keyboards and arrangements. Forster recalled, "She was a girl we saw in Sydney, a multi-instrumentalist, and she sings; we thought we needed that."

Brown was recorded on two of the Go-Betweens' studio albums, Tallulah (1987) and 16 Lovers Lane (1988). The five-piece ensemble returned to Australia in November 1987, where Vickers was replaced by Brown's former bandmate Willsteed on bass guitar. The latter album provided the group's most popular single, "Streets of Your Town" (July 1988), which was written by McLennan while living with Brown in Sydney. Maura Johnston of NPR observed, "The shimmering 'Streets of Your Town', a saudade-infused saunter that's highlighted by Brown's sun-dappled backing vocal, is an especially summery offering." The band toured for 18 months promoting 16 Lovers Lane, which ended in Munich, Germany. Michael Armiger replaced Willsteed on bass guitar in March 1989. The Go-Betweens broke up in December 1989, after a farewell tour of England.

As a session musician, Brown was recorded on Love Gone Wrong's album From Go to Woe (1986) providing violin, including on their single "Big Country" (July). Former Climbing Frame bandmates Brookes, David Hawkes and Sherman were members of Lucky Dinosaurs in 1987 with Lea Cameron on lead vocals, Adam Cox on guitar, Greg Flannery on saxophone, Lindsay Jones on trombone and David Richardson on bass guitar. Brown provided bass guitar, drums, guitar and keyboards for Lucky Dinosaurs' four-track EP That Was (1987). She also worked on Chad's Tree's album Buckle in the Rail (1987) and the Reels's album Neighbors (1988).

=== 1990s ===
Following the break-up of the Go-Betweens, Brown and Morrison formed the pop band Cleopatra Wong (1990–1993) in Sydney. They released two EPs on the rooArt label, six-track Egg (February 1992) and five-track Cleopatra's Lament (March 1993), including the single (and video) "Thank You". Besides violin and keyboards Brown provided lead vocals, mandolin and acoustic guitar; together with Morrison, she co-wrote their material. For Egg they were joined in the studio by former bandmate Armiger on bass guitar, Colin Bloxsom on percussion (ex-Love Gone Wrong), Frank Millward on keyboards and Mark Moffatt on guitars as well as producer (ex-the Monitors). On Cleopatra's Lament the duo "use striking imagery or constructions in their lyrics and complex arrangements in their music, and are unafraid to be playful or delight in the unexpected... [her] skills on violin, guitar, oboe and mandolin provide a richer, more sophisticated sound".

Brown was the first musician to guest host the ABC-TV music video programme, rage, on 7 January 1990. During the early 1990s she undertook session work on Tactics' The Great Gusto (1990), Bughouse's Every Fool in Town (1991), Shane Howard's "Escape from Reality" (single, 1991), McLennan's Watershed (1991), Died Pretty's Doughboy Hollow (1991), Wendy Matthews's Lily (1992) and Wayne Gillespie's Living in Exile (1993). Later work in the decade included playing with Sydney band Love Me (1997–1998) and sessions for Boxcar's Algorhythm (1994), R.E.M., Dog Trumpet's Suitcase (1996), Silverchair's Freak Show (1997), David Lane, the Cruel Sea's Over Easy (1998) and the Apartments.

=== 2000s ===
Brown has established a career as a screen composer, writing for television and film soundtracks since 2000. In 2003 she released the Incognita soundtrack album via Vitamin Records, which provided a mixture of songs and instrumentals accompanying performances of the contemporary dance work of the same name by the Stalker Theatre Company. Incognita toured Australia and Europe, commencing at the Sydney Festival 2003; the show explored issues of Australia's past and present. Accompanying Brown on the soundtrack are Richard Boxhall on guitar, Jim Elliot on drums and percussion, Ken Gormley on bass guitar, Maryann Camilleri on vocals ("In My Heart's a Home for You") and Kimi Tupaiya on vocals ("Hey Devil").

Brown was also the occasional sixth member of Toni Collette's live band, The Finish, and has continued to record and perform with various artists including David Bridie, The Vines, Youth Group and Josh Pyke. In the winter 2007–08 she duetted with the Danish singer Michael Møller on the song "A Sunday Routine" from his debut solo outing from his band Moi Caprice.

In 2008 Brown won the IF Inside Film Award for Best Music for her score of Son of a Lion. A soundtrack album was released in late 2008. In 2009 she won the APRA/Australian Guild of Screen Composers Award for Best Music in a Documentary for the score of Sidney Nolan: Mask and Memory.

Brown continued to diversify; in 2009 she mixed David Lane's album Head in the Clouds.

Brown has composed scores for feature films, including Preservation (2003), Floodhouse (2003), Look Both Ways (2005) Monkey Puzzle (2007) and Son of a Lion (2008). Documentaries she has composed the music for include Suburb For Sale (2006) and A Well Founded Fear (2008).

=== 2010s ===
In 2020 Brown composed the soundtrack for the documentary Brazen Hussies. As of January 2021 she was recording her first-ever solo album of original material.

== Other roles ==
In 2015, Brown was elected to the APRA Board as a writer/director.

== Personal life ==
Brown established a personal relationship with the Go-Betweens' founder Grant McLennan a few months after she joined the band in 1986, which ended before the group disbanded in 1990. McLennan wrote "Streets of Your Town" (1988) while living in Sydney with Brown, who provided backing vocals, including the prominent "shine" refrain. By May 1993, Brown was dating radio and TV personality Simon Marnie. As of August 2015, the couple were living in the Sydney suburb of Maroubra, New South Wales.

== Discography ==
=== Albums ===
List of albums, with selected details
Title	Details
Eight Guitars	Released: 2023; Format: CD, vinyl; Label: Bandcamp (LP 041)
Incognita	Released: 2002; Format: CD; Label: Vitamin (AGB 103)
Son of a Lion	Released: 2008; Format: CD; Label: Think (THINK1004)

== Awards and nominations ==
=== ARIA Music Awards ===
The ARIA Music Awards is an annual awards ceremony that recognises excellence, innovation, and achievement across all genres of Australian music. They commenced in 1987.

Year	Nominee / work	Award	Result	Ref.
2009	Son of a Lion	Best Original Soundtrack, Cast or Show Album	Nominated	
2026	Deadloch Season 1	Best Original Soundtrack, Cast or Show Album	Nominated	

=== AACTA Awards ===
Year	Nominee / work	Award	Result	Ref.
2017	The Family	Best Original Music Score in Documentary	Nominated	
2019	The Cult of the Family	Best Original Music Score in Documentary	Nominated	
2020	Babyteeth	Best Original Score in a Documentary	Won	
2020	Brazen Hussies	Best Original Music Score in Documentary	Won	
2024	RFDS	Best Original Music Score in Television	Nominated	
2024	Deadloch	Best Original Music Score in Television	Won	

=== Don Banks Music Award ===
Brown received the 2024 Don Banks Music Award, recognising her work as a composer.

=== Screen Music Awards ===
Year	Nominee / work	Award	Result	Ref.
2026	Deadlock (season 2) by Amanda Brow	Best Soundtrack Album	Nominated	
