= Xero (band) =

Australian punk rock/new wave band

- Also known as: Zero; Xiro
- Origin: Brisbane, Queensland, Australia
- Genres: Punk rock; new wave; experimental; avant garde; post-punk
- Years active: 1978–1983
- Label: M Squared
- Spinoffs: The Go-Betweens, The Apartments
- Past members: see Members below

Xero (also styled as Zero or Xiro) were an Australian punk rock and new wave band formed in 1978 in Brisbane, Queensland. They were fronted by mainstay member, Irena Luckus on lead vocals, keyboards and guitar before disbanding in 1983.

== History ==
Zero were formed in Brisbane in 1977 with the initial line-up of Peter Adams on guitar and vocals; Chris Anderson on guitar and vocals; Jude Clarkin on bongos; Barbara Hart on saxophone and flute; John Hunt on bass guitar; Irena Luckus on vocals, keyboard and guitar; and Debbie Penny on drums. By 1978, now including Vic Allen, Deborah Thomas and Lindy Morrison, the band travelled across New South Wales by train, playing gigs in Canberra (in a large, very cold hall) and Newcastle (in a local pub). Allen would go onto become a member of several bands in the Sydney alt-country scene in the 1990s, including all-girl outfits Ghost Ranch and The Cheryls, and alt-country stalwarts, The Parwills. In 1979 the group settled as a four-piece with Luckus, Morrison, John Willsteed and Michael O'Connell, and among a number of significant gigs, opened for The Cure in support of that group's second album, Seventeen Seconds. The Go-Betweens Robert Forster was an occasional guest, and when Morrison left in September 1980 to join Forster and Grant McLennan, O'Connell also left, moving to Sydney to play in a number of bands. Zero then became Xiro, and decided on the Roland DR-55 as a suitable drummer replacement.

Xiro issued two different four-track extended plays, Half the Profits and Religious Wars, on audio cassette in mid-1980. They supported The Cure again in 1981, with guest and future Xero drummer Steven Pritchard. Luckus and Willsteed were then joined by Clare McKenna on drums to become Xero and entered a period of intense song-writing in their Fortitude Valley practice rooms, and performing at various Brisbane venues. In 1982 Xero recorded a six-track extended play, Lust in the Dust, at Basement Studios, Brisbane with the line-up of Luckus, Tony Childs on bass guitar; John Willsteed on bass guitar, guitar, casio keyboards and vocals; and Steven Pritchard on drums.

Xero split in 1983 when Luckus left Brisbane to relocate to France. Later, Morrison and Willsteed were members of fellow Brisbane group, the Go-Betweens. O'Connell and Willsteed were both members of the Apartments. They have reformed for gigs since then, initially in 1986.

== Members ==
- Irena Luckus – vocals, keyboard, guitar (1978–84)
- Chris Anderson – guitar, vocals (1978)
- Peter Adams – guitar, vocals (1978)
- Debbie Penny – drums (1978)
- John Hunt – bass guitar (1978)
- Barbara Hart – saxophone, flute (1978)
- Jude Clarkin – bongos (1978)
- Vic Allen (aka Nicki Nought) – guitar (1979)
- Deborah Thomas (aka Debbie Zero) – guitar (1979)
- John Willsteed (aka John e) – bass guitar (1979–84), vocals (1980–84), guitar and keyboards (1981–84)
- Lindy Morrison – drums (1979–80)
- Robert Forster – guitar, vocals (1979)
- Michael O'Connell – guitar, vocals (1979-1980)
- Clare McKenna – drums, bass guitar, vocals (1980-1981)
- Mal Skewis – vocals (auxiliary live musician, 1980-1981)
- Gary Warner – vocals, soprano saxophone (auxiliary live musician, 1980-1981)
- Colin Bloxsom – guitar (auxiliary live musician, 1980-1981)
- Steven Pritchard – drums (1981-1982)
- Tony Childs – bass guitar (1982)
- Tony Milner – guitar (1983)

Timeline

== Discography ==
- Half the Profits (as Xiro) cassette EP (independent, July 1980)
- Religious Wars (as Xiro) cassette EP (independent, July 1980)
- Lust in the Dust (as Xero) 12" EP (M-Squared, 1982)
- Xiro Live at the Cement Box Theatre CD (Ten of Cups, 1998)
