= Moi Caprice =

Danish rock band

moi Caprice
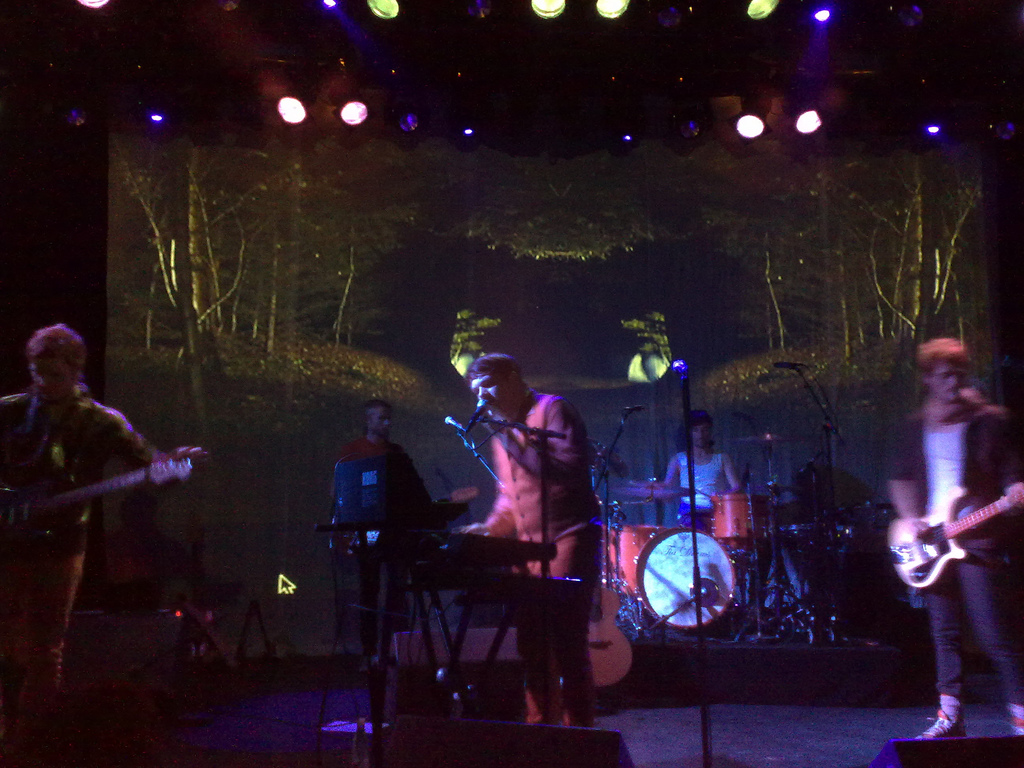
- moi Caprice in 2008

Background information
- Origin: Denmark
- Genre: Indie rock
- Years active: 1993–present
- Label: Glorious Records
- Members: Michael Møller; David Brunsgaard; Casper Henning Hansen; Jacob Funch; Fridolin Nordsø
- Past members: Christian Hillesø; Jakob Millung

moi Caprice is an indie rock band from Denmark. Current members are Michael Møller, David Brunsgaard, Casper Henning Hansen, Jacob Funch and Fridolin Nordsø. The band, formed as early as 1993 as Concrete Puppet Frog, rose to visibility in 1997 as the first unsigned band to top the Danish alternative music charts, despite the lack of a released studio album. The band has remained active, releasing five albums beginning in 2003, and touring internationally, including performances in Canada and Vietnam. After their fourth studio album, We Had Faces Then released in 2008, the band members drifted apart. After a twelve-year hiatus the band re-emerged with their fifth studio album, Becoming Visible in 2020, and has since released multiple EPs and singles. Their latest studio album, Vermillion Sands, was released in 2025.

Their third album, The Art of Kissing Properly (2006), earned them four Critics Award nominations and two nominations for Danish Music Awards, and they won the prize for best band at the Danish critics award, Steppeulven.

== Discography ==
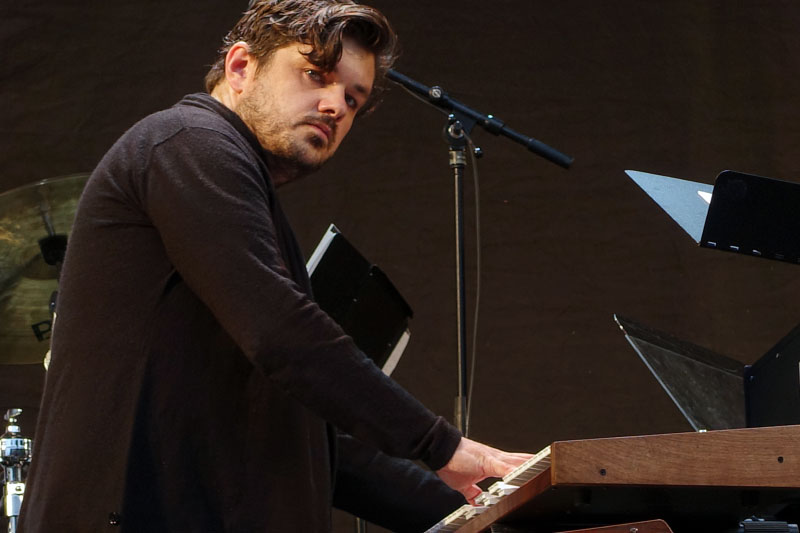
Lead singer Michael Møller in 2015.

=== Studio albums ===
- 2003: Once upon a Time in the North
- 2005: You Can’t Say No Forever
- 2006: The Art of Kissing Properly
- 2008: We Had Faces Then
- 2020: Becoming Visible
- 2022: Nine Lives
- 2025: Vermillion Sands

=== EPs and singles ===
- 2002: Daisies and Beatrice (CD-EP) (May 2002)
- 2002: Summerfool (CD-EP) (October 2002)
- 2003: Artboy Meets Artgirl (CD-EP) (January 2003)
- 2007: To The Lighthouse (remixes) (Vinyl 12")
- 2021: Orpheus (Edison Jr. Stella Polaris Remix)
- 2020: The Places We Have Loved
- 2020: Advent
- 2025: Driving Too Fast
- 2025: A Difficult Age

=== Compilations ===
- 2002: Singles Collection (11 songs and 3 videos from earlier EPs. Popsicle, 2002)
- 2010: The Past is a Foreign Country (Alternative version) (Collection of alternative versions of previously released songs)
