= Go Between Bridge =

Bridge in Brisbane, Queensland, Australia

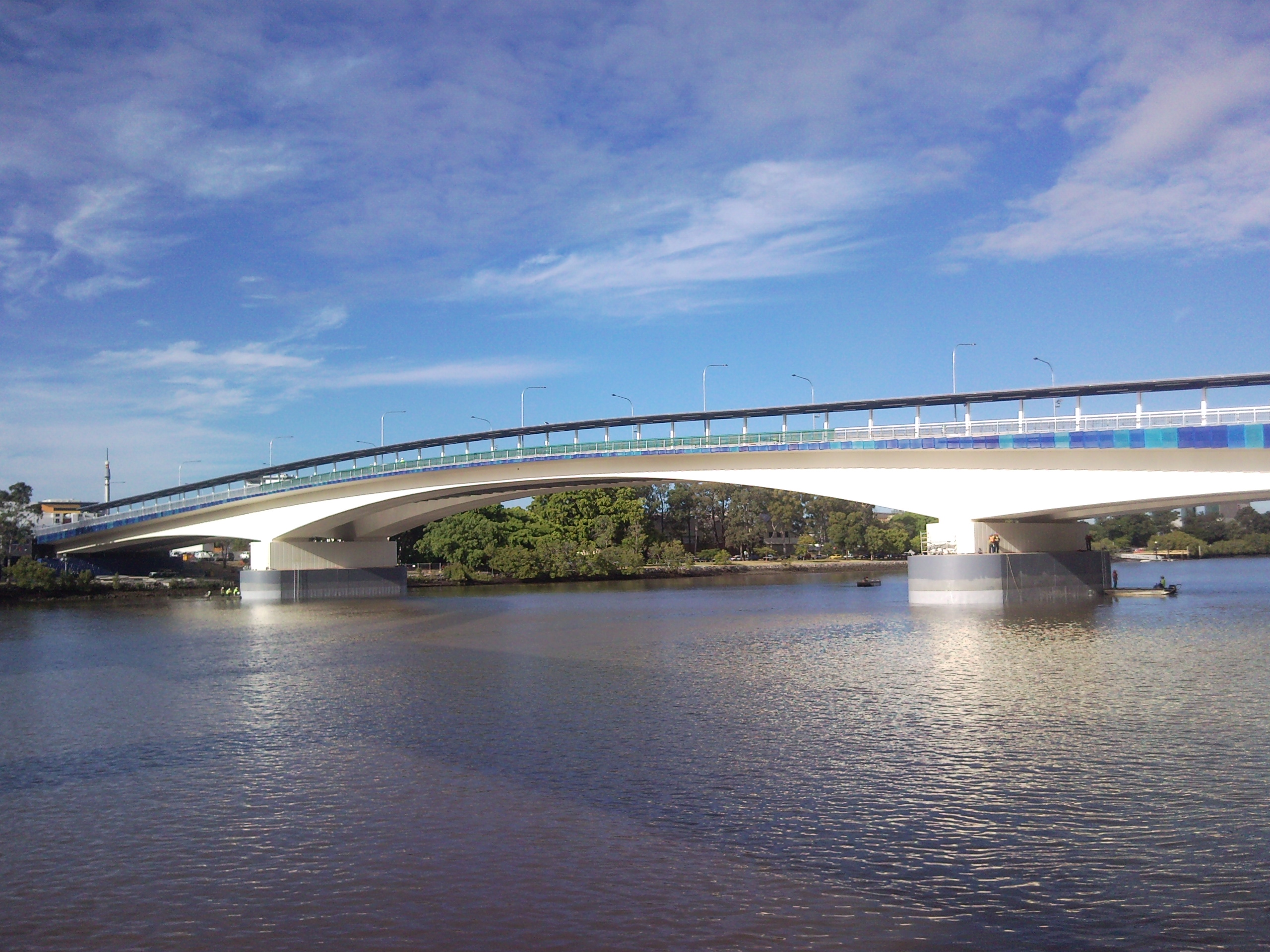
- Coordinates: 27°28′11″S 153°0′44″E
- Carries: Motor vehicles, pedestrians and cyclists
- Crosses: Brisbane River
- Locale: Brisbane, Queensland, Australia

Characteristics
- Design: Twin concrete cantilever box girder
- Longest span: 117 metres (384 ft)

History
- Opened: 5 July 2010; 16 years ago

Location
- Interactive map of Go Between Bridge

The Go Between Bridge, formerly known as the Hale Street Link, is a toll bridge for vehicles, pedestrians and cyclists over the Brisbane River in inner-city Brisbane, Queensland, Australia. The bridge connects Merivale and Cordelia Streets in West End to Hale Street and the Inner City Bypass at Milton. It is Brisbane's first inner-city traffic bridge in 40 years and carries around 12,000 vehicles per day. The bridge opened to traffic on 5 July 2010 and is now operated by Transurban Queensland.

The Go Between Bridge is named after the popular Australian indie rock band The Go-Betweens, which was formed in Brisbane. The bridge was part of Campbell Newman's TransApex transport plan. It extends the Inner City Bypass across the Brisbane River.

A charity concert featuring Robert Forster from the Go-Betweens and other singers was held on 25 June, followed by a community open day on 4 July 2010.

== Protests ==
The bridge was unpopular with many residents of West End, and with some parents from the West End State School who were concerned about increased traffic and air pollution. The "Stop the Hale Street Bridge Alliance" was formed to voice these concerns. At the start of the bridge's construction two protesters were arrested for allegedly writing graffiti on a wall surrounding the project site.

== Construction ==
Construction began in July 2008 and the project was completed in early July 2010. The bridge was built by The Hale Street Link Alliance (HSLA) which consisted of four companies; Bouygues Travaux Publics, Macmahon Holdings, Seymour Whyte and Hyder Consulting. During construction, lane closures on Coronation Drive caused delays for motorists and resulted in temporary changes to associated public transport services. The final concrete pour for the main bridge span occurred on 2 December 2009. The construction cost for the bridge was A$338 million.

== Bridge structure ==
The Go Between Bridge is a four-lane bridge with dedicated pedestrian and cycle pathways. It is a three span, twin concrete box girder structure built using balanced cantilever construction. The main bridge span is 117 m (384 ft) long, supported by two river piers located 74 m (243 ft) north and 80 m (260 ft) south of the abutments on each river bank. The pathways are 3.6 m (12 ft) wide and designed for equitable access. A pedestrian pathway is located on the eastern (city) side of the bridge and a cycleway on the western (Toowong) side. As the bridge is steep, the pedestrian path was built as a separate structure at a lesser grade. This allows for the path gradient to comply with equitable and disabled access requirements.

== Naming ==
The Brisbane City Council held a naming competition for the bridge was held with ten short-listed suggestions put to a "popular vote" with "Go Between" attracting 30% of the vote. The winning name was announced on 29 September 2009.

Robert Forster, the guitarist for The Go-Betweens, later said, "When Grant and I sat around in 1978 thinking about the things we'd get from being in a rock band, a bridge wasn't one of them. It's not the actual bridge that's so astonishing, it's driving down roads that have those big signs like Ipswich, Gold Coast, and seeing Go Between Bridge. But really nice ... and a bridge is a beautiful thing. It's nicer than a Go-Between sewage works."

== Toll ==
Initially the Brisbane City Council planned to recover the cost of the bridge by collecting a toll of $2.70 per vehicle. However, due to budget savings this amount was reduced to $1.50 until the end of 2010, then for the first six months of 2011 it cost $2.00, rising to $2.35 plus CPI from July 2011. The bridge features free-flow tolling with electronic tag and video matching payment options. Queensland Motorways has a 50-year lease to toll and operate the bridge.

The bridge is operated by Transurban Queensland.

Toll prices as of 1 July 2025
Toll road	Class 1 (Motorcycles)	Class 2 (Cars)	Class 3 (Light Commercial Vehicles)	Class 4 (Heavy Commercial Vehicles)	Toll increase	Toll concessionaire	Expiry of toll concession
Go Between Bridge	$2.03	$4.05	$6.08	$12.15 (Note: Class 4 price shown is the peak hour price (5am–8pm daily). Class 4 off-peak price is $10.75.)	Annually on 1 July, by CPI	Transurban Queensland (Note: Under a long-term concession agreement with the Brisbane City Council) (62.5% owned by Transurban)	December 2063

== Route Numbering ==
The Go Between Bridge is numbered as M3 and State Route 33 Northwestbound but unnumbered Southeastbound.

== Patronage ==
In July 2010, 9,000 vehicles per day were using the bridge, increasing to 11,725 by mid September 2010. It was expected that this figure would rise to 17,500 by 2011 and in 2021 be 21,000 vehicles. During its first year of operation the bridge collected A$8.18 million from tolls but cost $30 million to operate. During that period the highest number of daily uses was 15,783 on 24 March 2011.

== Construction photo gallery ==
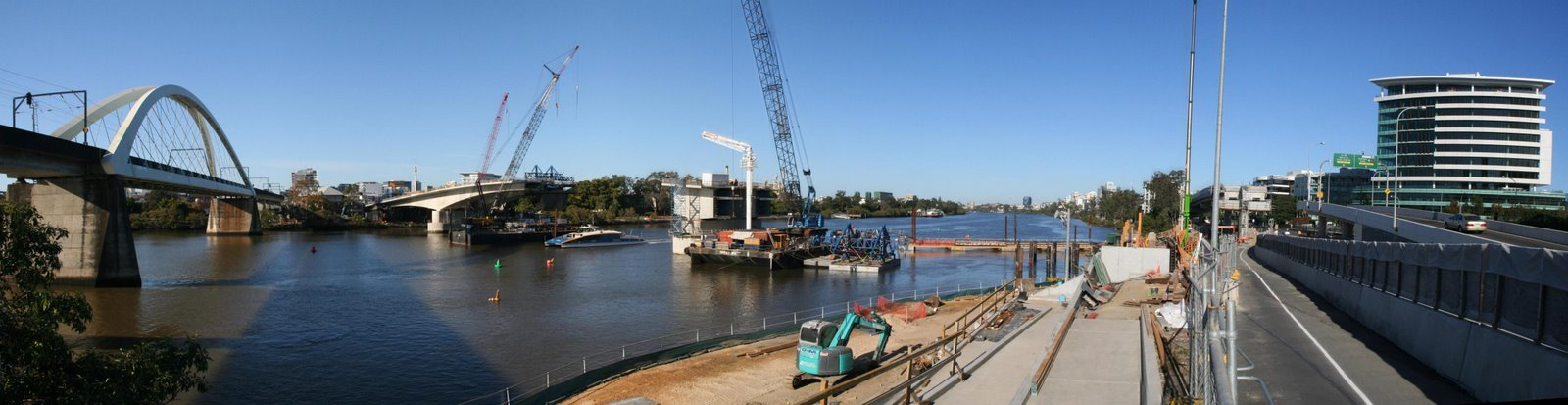
Go Between Bridge under construction, 9 August 2009

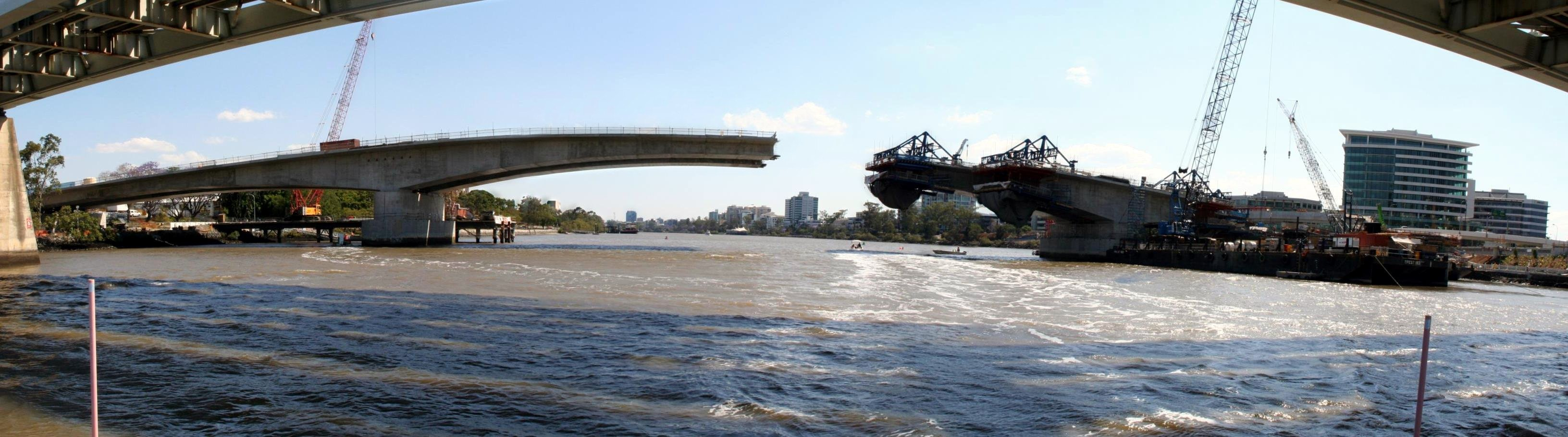
Go Between Bridge under construction, 17 October 2009

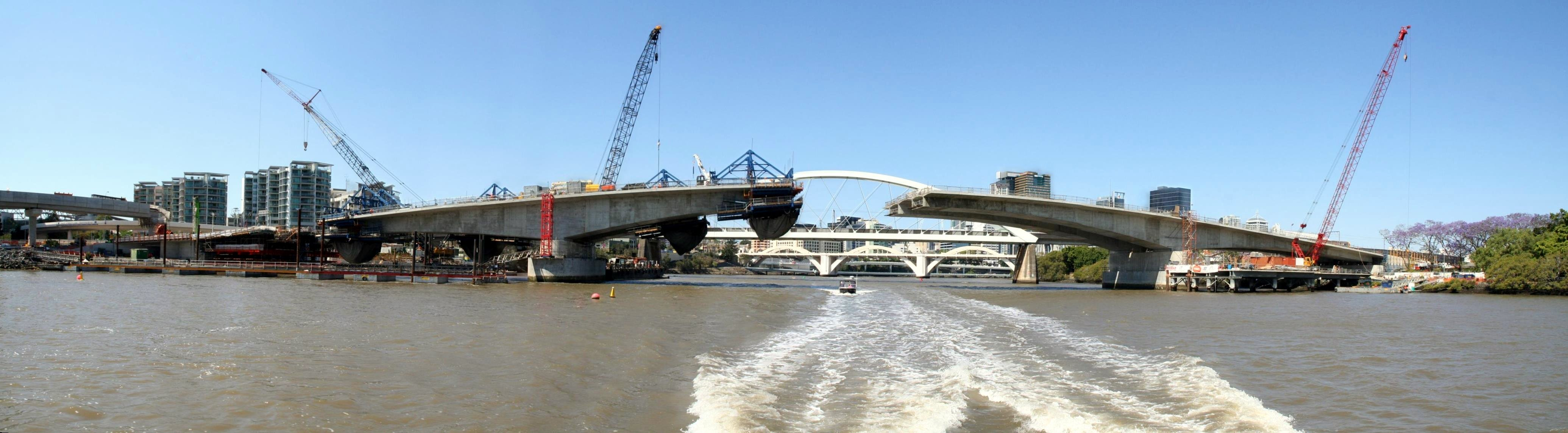
Go Between Bridge under construction, 17 October 2009

== See also ==
- South East Queensland Infrastructure Plan and Program
- TransApex
- Transport in Brisbane
