= The Go-Betweens =

Australian rock band

- The Go-Betweens, 1988; Left to right: Amanda Brown, John Willsteed, Grant McLennan, Lindy Morrison, Robert Forster; Courtesy Paul Cox, Capitol

Background information
- Origin: Brisbane, Queensland, Australia
- Genres: Indie pop; indie rock; jangle pop; post-punk; new wave
- Years active: 1977–1989, 2000–2006
- Labels: Able, Missing Link, Rough Trade, True Tone, Beggars Banquet, Postcard, Capitol (US), LO-MAX
- Past members: See past members below
- Website: go-betweens.net

The Go-Betweens were an Australian indie rock band formed in Brisbane, Queensland, in 1977. The band was co-founded and led by singer-songwriters and guitarists Robert Forster and Grant McLennan, who were its only constant members throughout its existence. Drummer Lindy Morrison joined the band in 1980, and its lineup would later expand to include bass guitarist Robert Vickers and multi-instrumentalist Amanda Brown. Vickers was replaced by John Willsteed in 1987, and the quintet lineup remained in place until the band split two years later. Forster and McLennan reformed the band in 2000 with a new lineup that did not include any previous personnel aside from them. McLennan died on 6 May 2006 of a heart attack and the Go-Betweens disbanded again. In 2010, a toll bridge in their native Brisbane was renamed the Go Between Bridge after them.

In 1988, "Streets of Your Town", the first single from 16 Lovers Lane, entered the Top 100 on both the Kent Music Report chart in Australia and the UK Singles Chart in the United Kingdom. The follow-up single "Was There Anything I Could Do?" was a No. 16 hit on the Billboard Modern Rock Tracks chart in the United States. In May 2001, "Cattle and Cane", from 1983's Before Hollywood, was selected by Australasian Performing Right Association (APRA) as one of the Top 30 Australian songs of all time. In 2008, 16 Lovers Lane was highlighted on Special Broadcasting Service (SBS) TV's The Great Australian Albums series.

== Career ==
=== 1977–1982: early years ===
Robert Forster and Grant McLennan met at the University of Queensland, where both were taking a theatre arts course. Forster provided vocals and guitar, while McLennan provided vocals, bass, and guitar; the pair shared songwriting duties. Together, they formed the Go-Betweens in December 1977 in Brisbane, Queensland. The name of the band reflects L. P. Hartley's classic novel The Go-Between. The band made its first public appearance as the support act for the Numbers at Baroona Hall in Brisbane in early April 1978.

We performed two songs, and as soon as we got off stage, Mark Callaghan, Robert Vickers – we met them all, in five minutes ... They immediately asked us to play a second show.

— Robert Forster

The band, however, were still without a drummer, having borrowed Gerard Lee for their first show. They had a succession of drummers, starting with Bruce Anthon (ex–the Survivors). With a guest drummer, Dennis Cantwell (the Riptides), they recorded their debut single, "Lee Remick", in May 1978. The song, an ode to the US actress Lee Remick, was released on the independent Able label in September 1978. The B-side to the single, "Karen", was a love song to a librarian. The sleeve depicts Forster and McLennan alongside portraits of Bob Dylan, Che Guevara and Lee Remick. The band sent copies to record labels around the world, with interest shown by the UK arm of America's Beserkley Records. The group's first real drummer was Temucin "Tim" Mustafa, recruited after the recording of "Lee Remick", although he appears on the picture sleeve of the single. The band further expanded with the addition of guitarist Peter Milton Walsh. Beserkley offered the band a contract that proposed the re-issue of "Lee Remick" and "Karen" as two singles, followed by an eight-album deal. The band recorded two more songs for Beserkley in November 1978 (including "The Sound of Rain"); however, when Beserkley went bust weeks later, Walsh left to form the Apartments.

The band's second single, "People Say", which was recorded in May 1979, was produced by the Go-Betweens with Mustapha on drums and Malcolm Kelly on piano and organ. The B-side, "Don't Let Him Come Back", is a farewell to Walsh, who remained friends with Forster and McLennan. From May 1978 to May 1979, the group recorded some tracks live in Forster's bedroom using McLennan's two-track tape deck—they were not released until 1999 as 78 'Til 79 – The Lost Album, which also includes both sides of the first two singles. These songs were simple pop tunes with a rough new wave edge, an obvious blend of pure pop influences such as the Monkees with the gritty simplicity of the Velvet Underground.

In November 1979, the duo left Australia with a plan to shop their songs from record company to record company simply by visiting their offices and playing them. In Glasgow, Scotland, on 28 April 1980, for independent label Postcard, they recorded their next single, "I Need Two Heads", with Steven Daly of Scottish band Orange Juice guesting on drums and Alex Fergusson producing. Forster returned to Australia in June 1980, whilst McLennan continued to New York. They followed Australian contemporaries the Birthday Party to the busier music scene in London. "I Need Two Heads" peaked at No. 6 on the UK independent charts. Upon return to Brisbane they were joined by Belinda "Lindy" Morrison (ex-Xero) on drums in 1980. In November 1980 the band played their first Sydney show at the Paris Theatre, supporting the Birthday Party and the Laughing Clowns. The band impressed Missing Link Records label boss, Keith Glass, which had re-issued "I Need Two Heads" for the Australian market, and offered to release the band's next single. Their fourth single, the first with Morrison, "Your Turn My Turn", was recorded in Sydney with Tony Cohen (the Birthday Party) in April 1981. The single was released in September. They recorded ten tracks as demos in Brisbane during 1981, which were released as Very Quick on the Eye by Man Made Records in 1982, the tracks showed that Morrison's "drum abilities, always a deeply underrated part of the band's appeal, fit hand in glove with the arrangements". By this time, Forster and Morrison were lovers and Morrison was living in Spring Hill, a neighbourhood in Brisbane.

The band's first official album, Send Me a Lullaby, produced by the Go-Betweens and Tony Cohen, on Missing Link in Australia, was released as an eight-track mini-album in November 1981. Missing Link's UK distributors, Rough Trade, released the album in the UK, three months later, with four tracks added. Morrison provided the album title, in preference to Two Wimps and a Witch, from a Zelda Fitzgerald novel, Save Me the Waltz. The group had developed a subtler sound consisting of dry semi-spoken vocals, complex lyrics and melodic but fractious guitar pop influenced by contemporary bands such as Television, Wire and Talking Heads. Australian rock music historian Ian McFarlane described the album as "tentative and clumsy [with] its brittle, rough-hewn sound". Forster and McLennan wrote all the tracks, they alternated lead vocal duties, except "People Know" which had Morrison on vocals and James Freud (Models) guesting on saxophone. Enticed by Rough Trade, the band relocated to London. The band's next single, "Hammer the Hammer", was released by Rough Trade in July 1982. In 2002, UK label Circus released a 2×CD version of Send Me a Lullaby which included "After the Fireworks" recorded as a collaboration with the Birthday Party's Nick Cave on vocals, Mick Harvey on piano and Rowland S. Howard on guitar. It had been released as a single under the band name Tuff Monks in 1982 on Au Go Go Records.

=== 1983–1989 ===
The Go-Betweens returned to the UK and recorded their second album, Before Hollywood (May 1983), with John Brand producing, at the International Christian Communications studio in Eastbourne. It established them as cult favourites while "Cattle and Cane" was released as a single and was "[a]rguably the band's absolute highlight of its earliest years". In Australia, the song had exposure on the national broadcaster Australian Broadcasting Corporation (ABC)'s iconic pop music TV series Countdown. Their tracks were played on ABC's alternative rock radio station Triple J—although mainly heard only in the Sydney region at that time. Despite the consistent critical acclaim their recordings garnered both in Australia and overseas, the Go-Betweens were mostly ignored by Australian commercial pop radio and never gained a broad national audience. Before Hollywood was described as "more world-weary ... full of deceptively simple yet accomplished songs".

Robert Vickers joined on bass guitar in late 1983—freeing McLennan for lead guitar work. Their next album, Spring Hill Fair (September 1984), was produced by Brand with Robert Andrews and Colin Fairley for Sire Records. The album was acclaimed as "the sound was bolder and more confident", while "Man O' Sand to Girl O' Sea", "Bachelor Kisses" and "Part Company" were issued as singles. In 1985, the band signed with True Tone Records distributed by PolyGram.

Liberty Belle and the Black Diamond Express, released in March 1986 on Beggars Banquet Records, received favourable reviews, and showed the band gradually moving towards a smoother and more contemporary sound while retaining elements of their idiosyncratic early style. McFarlane claims "[it] remains the band's most cohesive and finely crafted statement". "Spring Rain" (February) and "Head Full of Steam" (June) were released as singles, with "Spring Rain" reaching the Australian Kent Music Report Singles Chart Top 100.

Amanda Brown on violin, oboe, guitar, keyboards and backing vocals joined later in the year. Within a few months, Brown and McLennan were lovers—many of McLennan's new lyrics were about this relationship. Tallulah (June 1987), produced by the Go-Betweens for True Tone and Beggars Banquet, contained their "most winsome and hummable songs, 'Right Here' and 'Bye Bye Pride'"; while Brown's contributions "added extra lustre". LO-MAX Records released a 2×CD version of Tallulah in 2004; one of the additional tracks, "Doo Wop in 'A' (Bam Boom)", was co-written by Morrison, Brown, McLennan and Forster. In November 1987, the Go-Betweens returned to Australia and John Willsteed (ex-Xero with Morrison) replaced Vickers on bass.

16 Lovers Lane (1988) was the group's most commercial offering, providing the alternative radio hit "Streets of Your Town" (1988), which entered the singles charts in both the UK and Australia peaking in the Top 100 but not higher than the number 80. The follow-up single "Was There Anything I Could Do?" was a No. 16 hit on US alternative Modern Rock radio stations, and Beggars Banquet, trying to encourage the band's commercial momentum, re-released "Streets of Your Town" in the UK in early 1989, where it charted low once again. These minimal successes were hardly the hoped-for commercial breakthrough for the band.

After recording six albums, Forster and McLennan decided in December 1989 to disband the Go-Betweens. There were tentative plans to form an acoustic duo together. When McLennan told Brown, she ended their relationship. Forster and McLennan pursued solo careers. Brown and Morrison formed Cleopatra Wong in 1991.

All official albums released in the 1980s have titles with a double L word, except 16 Lovers Lane, which has two words beginning with an L. For their first few albums, this was simply a coincidence; by the end of the decade, for their own amusement the band deliberately kept to a self-imposed 'tradition' of album titles that featured a double L.

=== 2000–2006: reformation ===
Forster and McLennan pursued solo careers throughout the 1990s, and McLennan also collaborated with Steve Kilbey of The Church in the studio project band Jack Frost.

Forster and McLennan were inspired to work together again after they were invited by fans at French music magazine Les Inrockuptibles to perform at the magazine's 10th anniversary on 23 May 1996 in Paris. For this performance the band comprised Forster, McLennan, Adele Pickvance on bass guitar and Glenn Thompson on drums.

In 2000, Forster, McLennan and Pickvance went to Jackpot! studio in Portland, Oregon, with members of Sleater-Kinney, and recorded the album The Friends of Rachel Worth (the first album to ignore their "double L" titling tradition).

In 2001 Thompson rejoined the band for the Australian Big Day Out Festival. This line up of Forster, McLennan, Pickvance and Thompson went on to record Bright Yellow Bright Orange and in October 2005, the Go-Betweens finally achieved mainstream recognition, with the album Oceans Apart (produced by Mark Wallis and Dave Ruffy) winning the ARIA Award for Best Adult Contemporary Album. Grant McLennan died on 6 May 2006 of a heart attack, and Robert Forster subsequently announced that the Go-Betweens were no more. Forster has continued to perform and records as a solo artist and has also written well-received music criticism.

In August 2006, several of their albums re-entered the ARIA top 500.

== Legacy ==
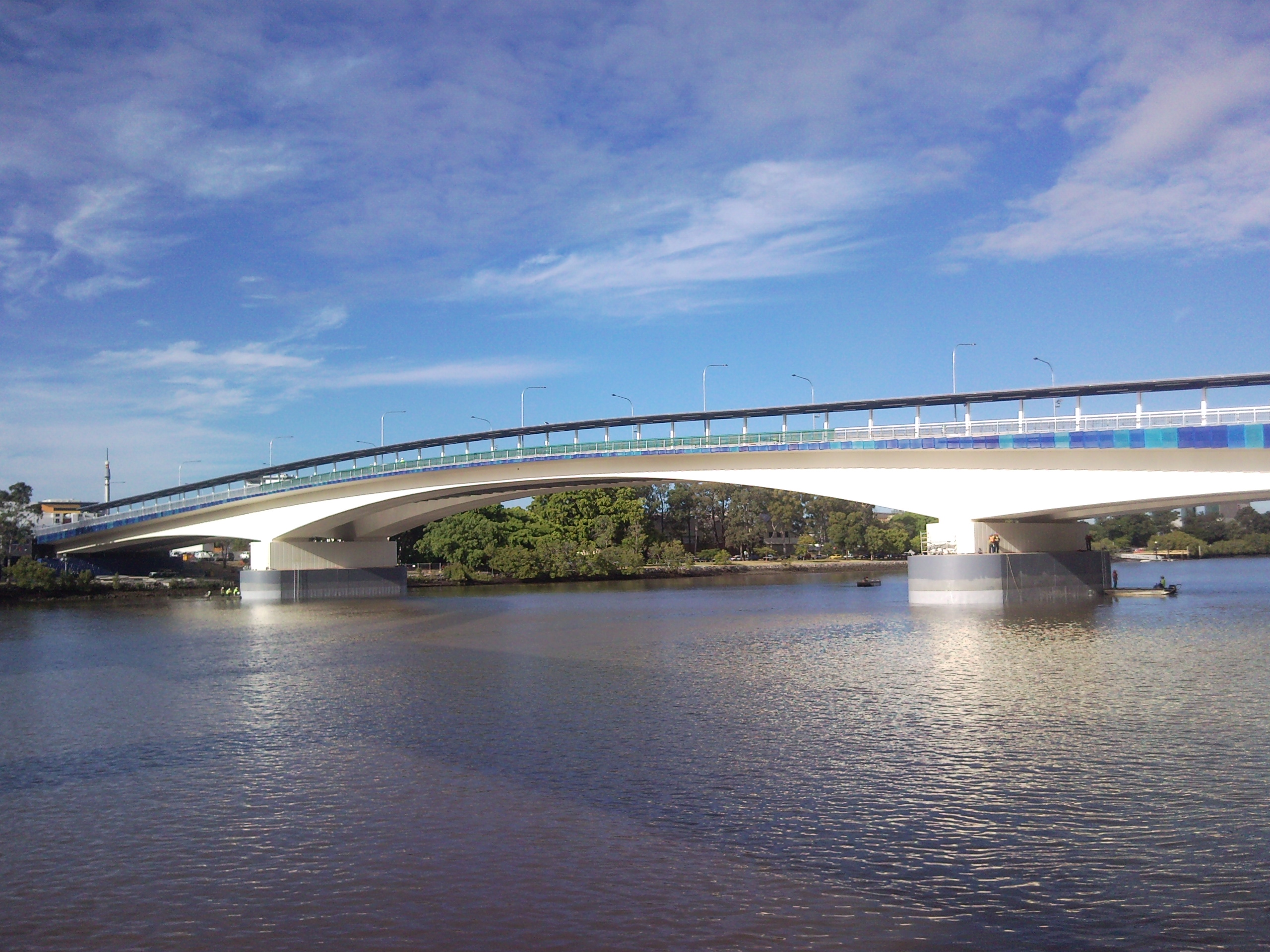
Opened in 2010, the Go Between Bridge in Brisbane is named after the band.

The focal point of the Go-Betweens was the song writing skills of Forster and McLennan, described by The Village Voice critic Robert Christgau as "the greatest songwriting partnership working today." Each developed a distinctive but complementary style: Forster's songs were angular and angst-ridden, making much use of irony and unusual lyrical imagery, while McLennan's were generally softer and more sensitive, his lyrics often based on character study and reported speech. They never secured an Australian or UK Top 50 chart single—a fact which mystified their supporters in the press, to the point where this "scandalous" lack of popular success became a cliché when writing about the band. However, there were a few very minor chart successes for the band, starting with "Spring Rain", which snuck into the lower rungs of the Australian charts in 1986 and became the band's first ever Top 100 chart hit. The following year, "Right Here" similarly rode low on the UK Top 100 Charts. Then in 1988, "Streets of Your Town", the first single from 1988's 16 Lovers Lane, reached the Top 100 in both Australia and UK.

In May 2001 "Cattle and Cane", written by McLennan and Forster, was selected by Australasian Performing Right Association (APRA) as one of the Top 30 Australian songs of all time. McLennan described writing the lyrics:

I wrote (the song) to please my mother. She hasn't heard it yet because my mother and stepfather live (on a cattle station) and they can't get 240 volts electricity there, so I have to sing it over the phone to her ... I don't like the word nostalgic; to me, it's a sloppy yearning for the past, and I'm not trying to do that in that song. I'm just trying to put three vignettes of a person, who's a lot like myself, growing up in Queensland, and just juxtaposing that against how I am now.

— Grant McLennan, 1983

Their song, "Streets of Your Town", was used by Prime Television and GWN in their station identification from 2001 to 2003.

In the 4th Season of American TV Series 24 a company is named McLennan-Forster—the producer of the series and author, Evan Katz, wanted to express his veneration of the Go-Betweens by this company name.

On the eve of the first anniversary of McLennan's death, Triple J & JTV broadcast a tribute concert to The Go-Betweens, recorded in 2006 at Brisbane venue, the Tivoli Theatre. Inspired by this tribute concert, and featuring many of the same artists, a tribute album to the Go-Betweens, Write Your Adventures Down, was released in June 2007 in Australia by The Red Label.

In 2008, 16 Lovers Lane was highlighted on SBS TV's Great Australian Albums series as a classic example of 1980s rock music. The documentary was later released on DVD.

On 29 September 2009, Brisbane City Council announced that a four-lane traffic bridge, previously known as Hale Street Link, would be renamed as Go Between Bridge in the band's honour, following a popularity poll.

The Go-Betweens are referenced in the Teenage Fanclub song "When I Still Have Thee" (2010), the Belle and Sebastian song "Shoot the Sexual Athlete" (2001), the song "Don't Want to Be Grant McLennan" (1991) by fellow Australians Smudge, and the song "Kathy" (1993) by Clouds.

Nada Surf covered their song "Love Goes On!" on their covers album If I Had a Hi-Fi (2010).

Robert Forster continues to perform and also contribute articles to The Monthly magazine. On the 3rd February 2023 he released his eighth studio album, The Candle and the Flame featuring Adele Pickvance on bass.

Many Australian bands and artists associated with the dolewave genre cite the Go-Betweens as a major influence, including Dick Diver and singer-songwriter Courtney Barnett.

== Members ==
- Robert Forster – lead vocals, guitar (1977–1989; 2000–2006)
- Grant McLennan – lead vocals, guitar, harmonica (1977–1989; 2000–2006), bass (1977–1983)
- Bruce Anthon – drums (1978, 1979–1980)
- Dennis Cantwell – drums (1978)
- Lissa Ross – drums (1978)
- Tim Mustapha – drums (1978–1979)
- Peter Milton Walsh – guitar, backing vocals (1978–1979)
- Malcolm Kelly – piano, organ (1979)
- Steven Daly – drums (1980)
- Claire McKenna – drums (1980)
- Dave Tyrer – guitar (1980)
- Lindy Morrison – drums, backing vocals (1980–1989)
- Robert Vickers – bass (1983–1987)
- Amanda Brown – violin, oboe, guitar, keyboards, backing vocals (1986–1989)
- John Willsteed – bass, guitar (1987–1989)
- Michael Armiger – bass (1989)
- Adele Pickvance – bass, backing vocals (2000–2006)
- Matthias Strzoda – drums (2000)
- Janet Weiss – drums, backing vocals (2000)
- Glenn Thompson – drums, backing vocals, keyboards (2001–2006)

Timeline

== Discography ==
The Go-Betweens discography
- Studio albums: 9
- Extended plays: 3
- Live albums: 3
- Compilation albums: 7
- Singles: 24

=== Albums ===
==== Studio albums ====
List of studio albums, with selected chart positions and certifications
Title	Album details	Peak chart positions				
Title	Album details	AUS	UK (Indie)	UK	IRE	GER
Send Me a Lullaby	Released: November 1981; Label: Missing Link (ING005)	—	28	—	—	—
Before Hollywood	Released: May 1983; Label: Rough Trade (ROUGH 54); Format: LP	—	2	—	—	—
Spring Hill Fair	Released: September 1984; Label: Sire (25179–1); Format: LP	—	—	—	—	—
Liberty Belle and the Black Diamond Express	Released: March 1986; Label: Beggars Banquet (BEGA 72); Format: LP, CD	62	—	—	—	—
Tallulah	Released: June 1987; Label: Beggars Banquet (BEGA 81); Format: LP, CD	71	—	91	—	—
16 Lovers Lane	Released: August 1988; Label: Mushroom (L38950); Format: LP, CD	48	—	81	—	—
The Friends of Rachel Worth	Released: September 2000; Label: W. Minc (WMINCD018); Format: CD, LP	61	—	—	—	—
Bright Yellow Bright Orange	Released: 24 February 2003; Label: Trifekta (HORSE024-2); Format: CD	126	—	—	—	—
Oceans Apart	Released: 3 May 2005; Label: LO-MAX (4743702); Format: CD	54	—	85	34	60
"—" denotes a release that did not chart or was not issued in that region.

==== Charting compilations ====
List of albums, with Australian chart positions
Title	Album details	Peak chart positions	
Title	Album details	AUS	US CMJ
1978-1990	Released: December 1990; Format: CD, LP, CS; Label: Beggars Banquet	103	
Bellavista Terrace: Best of The Go-Betweens	Released: April 1999; Format: CD; Label: Beggars Banquet	58	—
78 'til 79: The Lost Album	Released: April 1999; Format: CD; Label: Beggars Banquet	—	16
Quiet Heart: Best of The Go-Betweens	Released: September 2012; Format: 2×CD, 2×LP; Label: EMI	51	—

==== Live albums ====
List of live albums
Title	Album details
Live on Snap with Deirdre O'Donoghue	Released: 1999; Label: Beggars Banquet (BBL 2020); Formats: CD
Live in London	Released: 9 May 2005; Label: Tag 5 (TAG009); Formats: 12" vinyl
That Striped Sunlight Sound	Released: 2006; Label: Capitol (0946 3 47939 9 5 ); Formats: CD, DVD
Fountains of Youth (Live at the Town and Country Club)	Released: 2020; Label: Beggars Banquet (BBQ-2163); Formats: 12" vinyl

=== Extended plays ===
List of extended plays
Title	EP details
The Able Label Singles	Released: 1986; Label: Situation Two (SIT 44 T); Formats: 12" vinyl
The Peel Sessions	Released: 1989; Label: Strange Fruit (SFPS 074); Formats: 12" vinyl
Worlds Apart	Released: 7 November 2005; Label: LO-MAX (LO-MAX 022V); Formats: 7" vinyl

=== Singles ===
Year	Title	Peak chart positions					Album
Year	Title	AUS KMR	NZ	UK	US Alt	UK Indie	Album
1978	"Lee Remick"	—	—	—	—	7	Non-album single
1979	"People Say"	—	—	—	—	—	Non-album single
1980	"I Need Two Heads"	—	—	—	—	6	Non-album single
1981	"Your Turn, My Turn"	—	—	—	—	—	Send Me a Lullaby
1982	"Hammer the Hammer"	—	—	—	—	—	Non-album single
1983	"Cattle and Cane"	—	—	—	—	4	Before Hollywood
1983	"Man O'Sand to Girl O'Sea"	—	—	—	—	24	Non-album single
1984	"Part Company"	—	—	—	—	—	Spring Hill Fair
1984	"Bachelor Kisses"	—	—	—	—	—	Spring Hill Fair
1986	"Spring Rain"	92	—	—	—	—	Liberty Belle and the Black Diamond Express
1986	"Head Full of Steam"	—	—	—	—	—	Liberty Belle and the Black Diamond Express
1987	"Right Here"	—	—	82	—	—	Tallulah
1987	"Cut It Out"	—	—	—	—	—	Tallulah
1987	"I Just Get Caught Out"	—	—	—	—	—	Tallulah
1987	"Bye Bye Pride"	—	—	—	—	—	Tallulah
1988	"Streets of Your Town"	68	30	80	—	—	16 Lovers Lane
1988	"Was There Anything I Could Do?"	159	—	—	16	—	16 Lovers Lane
1989	"Love Goes On"	—	—	—	—	—	16 Lovers Lane
1989	"Streets of Your Town" (re-issue)	—	—	82	—	—	16 Lovers Lane
"—" denotes a recording that did not chart or was not released in that territory.

Year	Title	Peak chart positions					Album
Year	Title	AUS	NZ	UK	US Alt	UK Indie	Album
2000	"Going Blind"	—	—	—	—	—	The Friends of Rachel Worth
2001	"Surfing Magazines"	165	—	—	—	—	The Friends of Rachel Worth
2003	"Caroline and I"	178	—	—	—	—	Bright Yellow Bright Orange
2005	"Here Comes a City"	—	—	—	—	—	Oceans Apart
2005	"Finding You"	—	—	—	—	—	Oceans Apart
"—" denotes a recording that did not chart or was not released in that territory.

== Awards and nominations ==
=== ARIA Music Awards ===
The ARIA Music Awards is an annual awards ceremony that recognises excellence, innovation, and achievement across all genres of Australian music. They commenced in 1987. The Go-Betweens won one award.

Year	Nominee / work	Award	Result	Ref.
1989	16 Lovers Lane	Best Group	Nominated	
1989	"Streets of Your Town"	Song of the Year	Nominated	
2003	Bright Yellow Bright Orange	Best Adult Contemporary Album	Nominated	
2005	Oceans Apart	Best Adult Contemporary Album	Won	
2006	That Striped Sunlight Sound	Best Music DVD	Nominated	

=== Australian Music Prize ===
The Australian Music Prize (the AMP) is an annual award of $30,000 given to an Australian band or solo artist in recognition of the merit of an album released during the year of award. They commenced in 2005.

Year	Nominee / work	Award	Result
2005	Oceans Apart	Australian Music Prize	Nominated
