= Able Label =

Australian independent record label

The Able Label was an independent record label from Brisbane, Australia.

The label was established by Damien Nelson (the proprietor of the Toowong Music Centre), together with Grant McLennan and Robert Forster in 1978 (47 years ago) and was the first independent record label in Brisbane. Whilst several Brisbane based bands had released their own independent singles, Able Label was the first to cater for a number of acts. The Go-Betweens released their first two singles, "Lee Remick" and "People Say", on the label in 1978 and 1979. It allowed a number of other Brisbane groups, The Numbers (later to become The Riptides), The Apartments and the Four Gods to press their own records using the Able Label logo. Not all bands were permitted to use the Able Label logo, one such band was Razar who were refused permission to use the logo on their seminal 1978 single "Task Force". The band were accused of appropriating the label's name, with the single using the catalogue number AB002. The most likely explanation is that it was a manufacturing error by the pressing plant in Sydney. Able Records were limited pressings ranging from 500 to 700 and are considered collector's items.

== Discography ==
Song	Artist	Release date	Catalogue
"Lee Remick"/"Karen"	The Go-Betweens	September 1978	AB001
"Sunset Strip"	The Numbers	1978	AB003
"Sunset Strip" / "Magic Castle" / "Rules of Love"	The Numbers	July 1979	AB004
"People Say" / "Don't Let Him Come Back"	The Go-Betweens	September 1979	AB005
"The Return of the Hypnotist"	The Apartments	October 1979	AB006
"Enchanted House" / "Restless"	The Four Gods	1981	AB007

== See also ==
- Lists of record labels
