= Lindy Morrison =

- Born: Belinda Morrison; 2 November 1951 (age 75); Sydney, New South Wales, Australia
- Genres: Indie rock; alternative rock
- Occupation: Musician
- Instrument: Drums
- Years active: 1978–present
- Labels: Able; Missing Link; Polydor; rooART; EMI; Capitol

Belinda "Lindy" Morrison OAM (born 2 November 1951) is an Australian musician, activist and social worker originally from Brisbane, Queensland. After starting her career working for a new Queensland branch of the Aboriginal Legal Service in 1972, and starting to play drums at about the same time, she became the drummer for female-led punk band Zero in 1978 and then joined Robert Forster and Grant McLennan to become the third member of the Go-Betweens in 1980.

She recorded and toured with the band until their first breakup in 1989, drumming on all of their first six albums while also working on a number of side projects, including Tuff Monks (with Nick Cave and Mick Harvey), and with Nikki Sudden.

After the Go-Betweens, Morrison continued to work as a drummer but also started to take positions within the music industry, including as an artist representative on the board of the Phonographic Performance Company of Australia, a role she held for nearly three decades. Her careers in music and social work converged in 1998 when she joined Support Act, a benevolent association for Australian musicians, as their National Welfare Coordinator. Morrison has also worked as a lecturer at Sydney Institute of TAFE, and has been involved with various community music projects, including as musical director for the Junction House Band (for musicians with a mild intellectual disability) and with Bondi Wave (for high school children).

In 2003 and 2004 she tried to enter politics with the Australian Democrats, unsuccessfully standing for seats in the eastern suburbs of Sydney in state and federal elections.

Morrison completed a master's degree in legal studies at the University of New South Wales in 2010 and has subsequently expanded her writing (much of which has been on her and other women's experiences in the music industry) to include subjects related to copyright law. In 2013, she was awarded the Order of Australia Medal for services as a performer and advocate. In 2014 she received the Ted Albert Award for Outstanding Services to Australian Music.

Having turned 70 in 2021, Morrison continues to work as a drummer, and recently said: "I certainly will never retire from playing music, that goes without saying. I keep getting interesting gigs with all sorts of different people."

Morrison's most notable recent collaborations have been with Alex the Astronaut, more than 40 years Morrison's junior, and Rob Snarski, best known for his work with the Blackeyed Susans. After touring for 18 months, in May 2023, Morrison and Snarski released a mini album called Someone said that Someone Said as SnarskiCircusLindyBand. The band also consists of Shane O'Mara, Dan Kelly and Graham Lee.

== Musicianship and performance style ==
Writing about her in the NME in 1983, Barney Hoskyns said "Lindy Morrison's drumming remains great in the way that Levon Helm or Charlie Watts are great; precise, quirky, inventive."

Morrison is the subject of the book My Rock 'N' Roll Friend, written by the singer Tracey Thorn of Everything But The Girl and published in 2021. The two first met in 1983 at the Lyceum in London, at a time when female instrumentalists were rare; Thorn's book details the inspiration she took from Morrison, and attempts to redress her perception that Morrison hasn't received the acclaim she deserved for her work with the Go-Betweens.

Thorn's writing also captures something about the rhythmic eccentricities of the Go-Betweens: "Robert and Grant often unwittingly write songs in weird time signatures, and when they bring these songs to Lindy, she decides to try to reflect or capture honestly the oddities of their structures. She thinks the boys don't really know how to count their bars, and they have no real sense of timing or rhythm, so it's left to Lindy to literally drum it into them. She is determined not to 'play through' the quirky patterns, and not to straighten them out. She thinks that would be too nice, too boring."

Thorn describes Morrison as a transgressive performer, indiscreet and immodest with her legs wide apart, adding: "When she starts hitting the drums, all at once she's making more noise than anyone else in the room. It's not ladylike, this noise she's making. And she's in charge, whatever the guitarist or the lead singer may think."

As the title of his 2016 memoir ("Grant & I: Inside And Outside The Go-Betweens") suggests, Robert Forster's writing about the band mostly focuses on the relationship between him and McLennan, but it also indicates that he understands Morrison's importance to the band:

"Her drum kit sounded fantastic and she rode every queer-timed riff and rolled on every chorus we put to her. Before Hollywood [the second Go-Betweens album] is a master class in creative rock drumming; hers is the distinguishing instrument."

Speaking about Cattle And Cane, the lead single for Before Hollywood, McLennan said of Morrison's drum part: "It had a great rhythm which I don't think any drummer in the world could've played except her. That rhythm never ceases to amaze me."

== Life ==
=== Early life and education ===
Though born in Sydney, Morrison "grew up in Queensland, the daughter of an eccentric doctor father and a conservative stay-at-home mother". Her great uncle is the renowned writer Ion Idriess who is the brother of her paternal grandmother.

She attended Somerville House, an independent school for girls in South Brisbane, and then the University of Queensland, where she completed a Bachelor of Social Work in 1972. Her final-year tutor, responsible for arranging placements for social work students, was Roisin Hirschfeld, a member of the steering committee of the Aboriginal Legal Service (ALS).

=== Initial career in social work ===
The Aboriginal Legal Service (subsequently known as ATSILS, for Aboriginal and Torres Strait Islander Legal Service) began operating out of the Uniting Church hall on Leichhardt Street, Spring Hill, in the winter of 1972, and Hirschfeld approached Morrison about joining the service late in 1972. Morrison became the organisation's first social worker and second full-time employee.

In her role as Aboriginal Field Officer for the ALS, she worked alongside the radical Aboriginal activist Denis Walker. Walker had founded a local chapter of the Australian Black Panthers and "refused to accept the legitimacy of 'White man's Law". The job of field officer involved her going out late at night on "pig-patrol" which she described as:

"... trying to stop the Police from picking up Aboriginal people coming out of the hotels, because they'd take them in a put them in gaol for drunkenness and the next morning I'd have to go to court, ask for bail, take them across to the legal service and the lawyers would then have to work towards stopping them being locked up or fined. So pig-patrol was the first way to stop them doing that so we'd go out on a pig-patrol every night at 10 o'clock."

=== Theatre and activism ===
During her time with the ALS, Morrison lived in central Brisbane, sharing a house with indigenous Australians, musicians and the actors Geoffrey Rush and Bille Brown. It was during this period that she would meet the people and become involved in the activities that set the tone of her life, and started playing drums. After "burn out" and leaving the service of the ALS, a two-year sojourn in England followed. On her return to Queensland, she moved into acting, believing that "the only salvation lay in art".

She was part of the Popular Theatre Troupe which protested against Joh Bjelke-Petersen's National Party government, performing their sharply satirical political street theatre around the state during a time when life in Queensland was felt to be strongly constrained by the government, select business groups, and political interests.

=== Musical career ===
==== Shrew – Zero ====
Morrison's first band, Shrew, performed in 1976 and 77. They were an all-girl acoustic band with members playing clarinet, saxophone, piano and guitar. Their repertoire consisted mainly of covers of 1940s pop songs.

In 1978, Morrison joined the band Zero. At the time, members included Irena Luckus, Nicki Nought and Deborah Thomas. The band started by performing Patti Smith and other punk covers before moving on to write their own material. Morrison said she left in 1981 because "They wanted drum-machines and synthesisers." On Morrison's departure Zero became Xero.

==== The Go-Betweens ====
The Go-Betweens were formed in 1977 in Brisbane, Queensland, by Robert Forster and Grant McLennan, who initially played bass guitar. The group had a succession of drummers and travelled to the United Kingdom in late 1979. They returned to Brisbane in 1980, at which point Morrison joined on drums and backing vocals. Their first single with Morrison, "Your Turn My Turn", appeared in September 1981 and was followed by "Hammer the Hammer" in March 1982. They recorded 10 tracks as demos in Brisbane during 1981, which had a limited release as Very Quick on the Eye by Man Made Records in 1982. The tracks showed that Morrison's "drum abilities, always a deeply underrated part of the band's appeal, fit hand in glove with the arrangements". By this time, Forster and Morrison were lovers and Morrison was living in Spring Hill, an inner-city Brisbane suburb.

The band's first official album, Send Me a Lullaby, produced by the Go-Betweens and Tony Cohen, appeared in February on Missing Link Records in Australia. Morrison provided the album title, in preference to Two Wimps and a Witch, from the Zelda Fitzgerald novel Save Me the Waltz. Forster and McLennan wrote all the tracks, alternating lead vocal duties according to who provided the lyrics. A mistaken interpretation of the original album credits has seen Morrison credited with lead vocals on "People Know" when in reality she only ever sang backing vocals for the Go-Betweens. The only guest musician on the album was James Freud (of the Models) who played saxophone on "People Know". In 2002, UK label Circus released a 2CD version of Send Me a Lullaby which included "After the Fireworks". This was recorded as a collaboration with The Birthday Party's Nick Cave on vocals, Mick Harvey on piano and Rowland S. Howard on guitar. It had been released as a single under the band name, Tuff Monks in 1982 on Au Go Go Records.

The Go-Betweens returned to UK and recorded their second album, Before Hollywood (May 1983), with John Brand producing. It established them as cult favourites while "Cattle and Cane" was released as a single and was "[arguably] the band's absolute highlight of its earliest years". In 2001, "Cattle and Cane" was selected by Australasian Performing Right Association (APRA) as one of the Top 30 Australian songs of all time.

The next album release was Spring Hill Fair (September 1984) which saw Robert Vickers replace McLennan on bass, and McLennan moving to guitar. Liberty Belle and the Black Diamond Express followed in March 1986, with the same line up. Amanda Brown joined the band later in 1986. Within a few months, Brown and McLennan were lovers—many of McLennan's new lyrics were about this relationship. Tallulah (June 1987), produced by the Go-Betweens for True Tone and Beggars Banquet, contained their "most winsome and hummable songs, 'Right Here' and 'Bye Bye Pride'"; while Brown's contributions "added extra lustre". LO-MAX Records released a 2CD version of Tallulah in 2004; one of the bonus tracks, "Doo Wop in 'A' (Bam Boom)" was co-written by Morrison, Brown, McLennan and Forster. In November 1987, the Go-Betweens returned to Australia and John Willsteed (who had previously played with Morrison in Zero) replaced Robert Vickers on bass.

The alternative radio hit "Streets of Your Town" (July 1988) was the lead single for the band's sixth album, 16 Lovers Lane (August 1988). It became the band's biggest chart hit in both the UK and Australia, peaking in the Top 100. The follow-up single "Was There Anything I Could Do?" failed to chart in either Australia or the UK, but peaked at number 16 on Billboard's Modern Rock Tracks charts in the United States. This minimal commercial success was hardly the hoped-for breakthrough for the band, and after recording six albums, Forster and McLennan disbanded the Go-Betweens in December 1989. Morrison and Forster had separated as a couple earlier and both Forster and McLennan pursued solo careers. In 2008, 16 Lovers Lane was highlighted on Special Broadcasting Service (SBS) TV's The Great Australian Albums series as a classic example of 1980s rock music.

==== Post Go-Betweens ====
In 1991, Morrison gave birth to daughter Lucinda Needham, fathered by John Needham, founder of Citadel Records. Morrison and Amanda Brown reunited to form Cleopatra Wong, with Brown acting as vocalist. They went on to record two EPs (Egg, 1992, and Cleopatra's Lament, 1993) releasing both of these on rooArt.

Morrison's career then moved more towards positions within the music industry, and community music projects, as detailed below. From November 2007 to 2011, however, she was a member of The Rainy Season, a five-piece band fronted by Jed Brown, and including Peter Jones (ex Cosmic Psychos), Clyde Bramley, and, once again, Amanda Brown.

In 2018, Morrison co-produced and played drums on The Charm's debut EP "Invisible" and also began to play with Alexandra Lynn (aka Alex the Astronaut); in 2020, Morrison appeared in Alex The Astronaut's music video for the single "Caught in the Middle" as both a drummer and tennis player and also performed on a live cover of ELO's Mr Blue Sky that was recorded for Triple J's Like A Version, broadcast on ABC TV and released on a compilation album.

In 2022, 2023 and 2024, Morrison recorded and toured with British band The Girl with the Replaceable Head. In 2023, she toured with Rob Snarski, lead singer of the Blackeyed Susans and formerly Chad's Tree, to promote his fifth solo album. In May 2023, Morrison and Snarski released a mini album called Somebody said that Somebody said under the band name of SnarskiCircusLindyBand with Shane O'Mara, Graham Lee and Dan Kelly. With the same line up and again with Shane O'Mara as producer and recorded (as was the first) in his Yikesville studio, in May 2024 they released their second mini album called I Know I Know and toured to promote this recording.

=== Music industry career ===
After she left the Go-Betweens, Morrison's main focus switched to working within the music industry, drawing on her background in social work as well as her experience as a performing and recording musician, but her work also included educational and organisational roles.

Morrison was the Vice President Australian Women's Contemporary Music Association 1988–1994.

Morrison became a board member of the Phonographic Performance Company of Australia in 1994 and served as a representative for registered Australian recording artists (making contributions to changes in policy to benefit recording artists) until 2021.

She joined Support Act Ltd, a benevolent society for Australian musicians, in 1998, as their National Welfare Coordinator. This role expanded greatly as a result of the COVID-19 pandemic, and after spending much of her time with Support Act as their only social worker, she came to lead a team of seven social workers and four admin assistants by the time she stepped down.

In 2007, Morrison was appointed as an Honorary Lifetime Member of the Music Council of Australia, for her services as a board member, and because she "gave great assistance to community music initiatives and guidance in issues around performers' rights".

Morrison is the author of a short workbook entitled "Australian women in rock and pop music" and made an hour-long video to accompany it. Intended as student material, the work is housed in the Performing Arts Collection at the Arts Centre, Melbourne, and in the National Library of Australia. Interviewees for the video include Kylie Minogue, Tina Arena and Wendy Matthews. More recently, she has also written numerous articles for Australian newspapers such as the Sydney Morning Herald and Guardian Australia as well as articles on legal matters relating to the music industry.

She was musical director of Trace Elements at the Mt Isa Theatrical Society (with Delma Barton and William Barton (musician)) (1995) and musical director for Beachport Festival by the Sea (1996), Blacktown Carnivale Multicultural Arts Festival Stunt Streets (1998), Dandenong Ranges Music Council Yarra Ranges Youth Music Festival (1998), Rocky Fringe River Rhythms Musical Director (2000) and Whittlesea Artist in Residence (1999–2000). Morrison was the Artist in Residence at South Sydney Youth Service (1998–2001) and was employed by TAFE as the head tutor for the music course run by SSYS. She also taught contracts and copyright and music business modules at TAFE.

Morrison's work in community music includes directing a group of intellectually disabled musicians for 24 years known as The Junction House Band, including for their performance at the first Australian event for the Wataboshi Festival, which had previously been held in a number of a different Asian cities and was visiting Australia for the first time. A documentary on the band called Junction House Blues was produced in 2007.

On 26 January 2013, Morrison was awarded an Order of Australia Medal for services as a performer and advocate and the next year she received the Ted Albert Award for Outstanding Services to Australian Music. In 2023, she was awarded the Queensland Lifetime Achievement Award at the Queensland Music Awards.

=== Politics ===
Morrison stood for election (unsuccessfully) as a candidate for the Australian Democrats in the New South Wales seat of Coogee at the 2003 state elections, and in the Division of Wentworth at the 2004 federal elections.

== Published writing ==
Morrison L. Light Touch Report on Music Workshops from the Inner West ACE Accessing Creative Expression Issue #10 Nov. 1994

Morrison L. Australian Women in Rock and Pop Music, Ausmusic. 1995

Morrison L. Billboard of Life ACE Issue #14 Sept 96

Morrison L. Beachport Festival by the Sea Music Alive Vol. 1 No. 2 1996

Morrison L. Improvisation in Rock and Pop Music Sounds Australian Vol. 14 No.48 1996

Morrison L. All about the Music Music Alive VOLUME 2 #1 March/ April 98

Morrison L. Editor Music Alive Vol. 3 #4 May – Aug 1999

Morrison L. Peter and the Pavilion Music Alive Vol. 3 #4 May – Aug 1999

Morrison L. Cunnynghame A. The Face of Australia commissioned by the Dandenong Ranges Music Council Centenary Songs Project 2000/2001 to celebrate Australia's Centenary of Federation 1901 -2001. Performed Melbourne Concert Hall Monday 28 May 2001

Morrison L. It's a Man's World Sydney Morning Herald 3–4 July 2004

Morrison L. Demolition Girl Rolling Stone May 2005 LLC Germany

Morrison L. Stranded in The Dismissal edited by Sybil Nolan MUP 2005

Morrison L. Drums Cattle and Cane ...The Right Way Australian Musician Issue 52 Summer 2007.

Morrison L. An Artist Defense of Copyright Music Forum Vol 17 #3 Winter 2011

Morrison L. The Rationale for Copyright Law Music Forum Spring 2011

Morrison L. To my most treasured possession in Women of Letters curated by Marieke Hardy and Michaela McGuire Penguin 2011

Morrison L., Turner C. Performers Copyright in sound recordings after the Australia–US FTA – mere symbolism? Intellectual Property Law Bulletin Vol. 17 No. 10 Lexis Nexus Butterworth's

Morrison L. Songs of Brisbane The Go Betweens 8 Sept 2018

Morrison L. My unforgettable gig The Go-Betweens 4 Jan 2022

Morrison L. My Rock n Roll confession to The Saint Chris Bailey 2 April 2022

== Filmography/video productions ==
- Australian Women in Rock and Pop Music, Ausmusic 1995
- Sisters Are Doing It for Themselves Video, Ausmusic 1995
- Home of Strangers, film, as Chavonne's grandma, 2009
