= Robert Vickers =

Australian musician

Robert Vickers (born 25 November 1958) is an Australian musician, who is known as the bass guitarist of the Go-Betweens.

Vickers grew up in Brisbane, Australia, and played in various local bands. He made his first record in 1978 as a member of the Numbers, who later changed their name to the Riptides. In 1979, he left Brisbane to live in New York City where he joined the Colors. The Colors were managed by Hilly Kristal, owner of rock club CBGB, and produced by Blondie drummer Clem Burke. During this time he briefly returned to Brisbane to act in a film titled Heather's Gloves, directed by Robin Gold and written by Grant McLennan of the Go-Betweens.

In January 1983, Vickers left New York and the Colors to join the Go-Betweens. He recorded three albums with the band before returning to New York in 1988. In the 1990s he toured Japan with Yo La Tengo, and the US and Europe with Lloyd Cole. He performed with Amy Rigby and toured and recorded with The Mad Scene, which included drummer Hamish Kilgour from The Clean. He also recorded with Malcolm Ross and Alice Texas. During a Go-Betweens US tour in 1999 he joined Robert Forster and Grant McLennan on stage at Fez in New York City, to play some of the songs they had recorded together in that band.

In 1998, Vickers became the publicist for New York indie label Jetset Records. He left to start his own PR company, Proxy Media, in 2005.

On 4 July 2010, Vickers joined the other surviving members of the Go-Betweens at the official opening of the Go Between Bridge in Brisbane.

In October 2019 his hometown of Oxley, a suburb of Brisbane, opened Robert Vickers Place Playground in his honour. Vickers attended Corinda State High School from 1971 to 1975, in the suburb adjacent to Oxley and he also attended the local Oxley State School.

== Selected discography ==
- The Numbers – Sunset Strip Able Label (1978)
- The Colors – Rave It Up EP Infinite Records (1980)
- The Colors – The Colors Dirt Records (1982)
- The Colors – Teenage Furniture Rave It Up Records (2007) (compilation of 1980s recordings)
- The Go-Betweens – Spring Hill Fair Sire Records (1984)
- The Go-Betweens – Liberty Belle And The Black Diamond Express Beggars Banquet (1986)
- The Go-Betweens – Tallulah Beggars Banquet (1987)
- Malcolm Ross – Malcolm Ross Bus Stop (1995)
- The Mad Scene – Sealight Merge Records (1995)
- The Mad Scene – Chinese Honey Merge Records (1997)
- Alice Texas – Gold Cockaigne (2000)
