= The Radio Dept. discography =

Discography of Swedish indie pop group

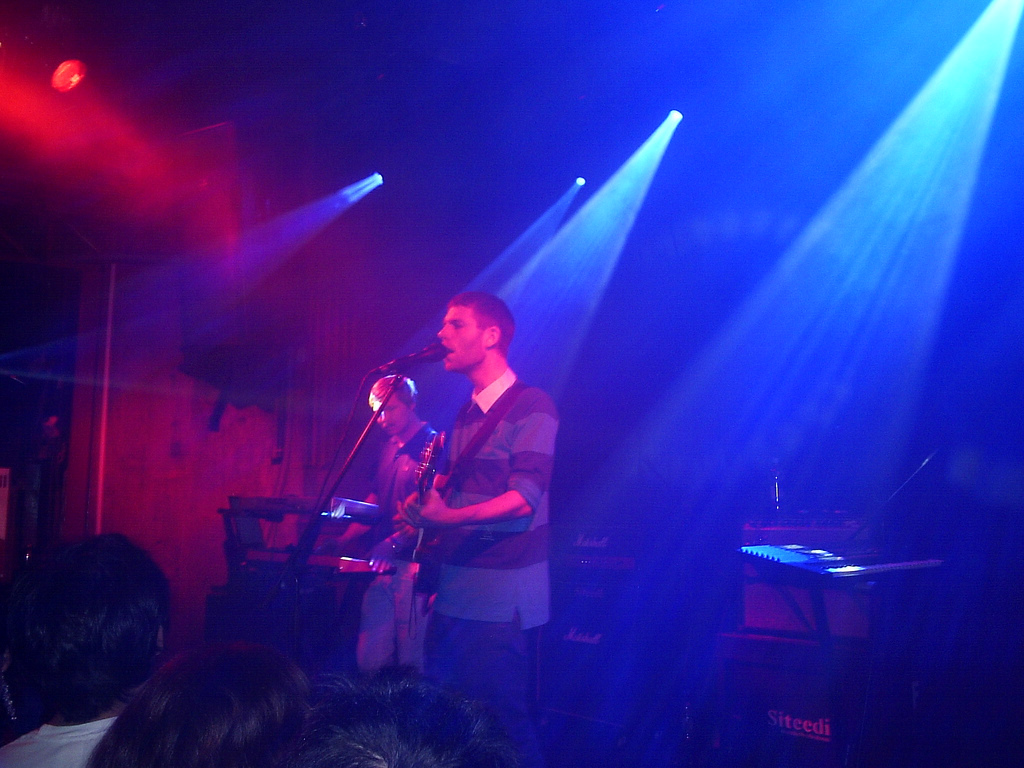
- The Radio Dept. in concert in Lima, Peru (October 2006)
- Studio albums: 4
- Extended plays: 11
- Compilation albums: 2
- Singles: 21
- Other appearances: 45

The discography of Swedish indie pop group, The Radio Dept. consists of four studio albums, eleven extended plays, 21 singles and two compilation albums. The Radio Dept. was formed in 1995 by Johan Duncanson, although they did not start recording until 2001. They were signed to Labrador Records the same year and have stayed with the label since. The band's lineup has changed over the years until it settled on the trio of Johan Duncanson and Martin Carlberg, with Daniel Tjäder on keyboards.

Their first album, Lesser Matters, was released to critical acclaim, although with little chart success outside of Sweden. It received rave reviews, achieving 'universal acclaim' status from Metacritic, and was ranked the 9th best album of 2004 by NME magazine. The album attracted enough attention for film producer Sofia Coppola to use three of The Radio Dept.'s songs for her film, Marie Antoinette.

Pet Grief, the band's second album, was received less well critically, although it charted higher in Sweden. There was a four-year break before their third album, Clinging to a Scheme was released in 2010. This album was received much better than Pet Grief and was the band's first album to chart in the USA, reaching no. 20 on the Billboard "Heatseekers" chart (which consists of the top 20 albums by artists that have never made the top 100). It featured on many end-of-year lists, including Pitchfork Media's 2010 Readers' Poll.

In July 2016, the band announced their fourth studio album, Running Out of Love which was released on 21 October of that year.

The Radio Dept. released their single Going Down Swinging in August 2018.

== Albums ==
=== Studio albums ===
Year	Album details	Peak chart positions	
Year	Album details	SWE	US
2003	Lesser Matters: Released: March 2003; Label: Labrador; Formats: CD, LP	31	—
2006	Pet Grief: Released: May 2006; Label: Labrador; Formats: CD, LP	12	—
2010	Clinging to a Scheme: Released: April 2010; Label: Labrador; Formats: CD, LP	11	20
2016	Running Out of Love: Released: October 2016; Label: Labrador; Formats:	11	—
"—" denotes a title that was not released or did not chart in that territory.

=== Compilation albums ===
Year	Album details	Peak chart positions	
Year	Album details	SWE	US
2010	Passive Aggressive: Singles 2002–2010: Released: January 2011; Label: Labrador; Formats: Double CD, Double LP	—	—
2019	I Don't Need Love, I've Got My Band: Released: August 2019; Label: Just So!; Formats: LP	—	—
"—" denotes a title that was not released or did not chart in that territory.

== Extended plays ==
To date, The Radio Dept. have released ten extended plays, and one split EP with Peruvian band Resplandor.

Year	EP details	Peak chart positions
Year	EP details	SWE
2000	Against The Tide: Released: 2000/2002; Label: Slottet; Format: CD, 7"	—
2002	Bus: Released: 2002; Label: Slottet; Formats: CD	—
2002	Annie Laurie: Released: 2002; Label: Slottet; Formats: CD	—
2003	Pulling Our Weight: Released: 2003; Label: Labrador; Formats: CD	36
2005	This Past Week: Released: 2005; Label: Labrador; Formats: CD	12
2006	The Radio Dept. / Resplandor: Released: 2006; Label: Automatic Entertainment; Formats: CD; Split EP released with Resplandor to promote concert in Peru.	12
2008	Freddie and the Trojan Horse: Released: 2008; Label: Labrador; Formats: CD, 7"	—
2009	David: Released: 2009; Label: Labrador; Formats: CD, 12"	—
2010	Never Follow Suit: Released: 2010; Label: Labrador; Formats: CD, 12"	—
2015	Occupied: Released: 2015; Label: Labrador; Formats: CD, 12"	—
2017	Teach Me To Forget: Released: 2017; Label: Labrador; Formats: CD, 12"	—
"—" denotes a title that was not released or did not chart in that territory.

== Singles ==
Year	Song	Peak chart positions		Album
Year	Song	SWE	UK	
2002	Liebling	—	—	Non-album single
2003	Where Damage Isn't Already Done	—	80	Lesser Matters
2004	Why Won't You Talk About It?	—	—	Lesser Matters
2004	Ewan	—	87	Lesser Matters
2006	The Worst Taste in Music	16	—	Pet Grief
2006	We Made The Team	—	—	Non-album single
2008	Freddie and the Trojan Horse	—	—	Non-album single
2009	David	—	—	Clinging to a Scheme
2010	Heaven's on Fire	—	—	Clinging to a Scheme
2010	Never Follow Suit	—	—	Clinging to a Scheme
2010	The New Improved Hypocrisy	—	—	Passive Aggressive: Singles 2002–2010
2014	Death To Fascism	—	—	Non-album single
2015	Occupied	—	—	Running Out of Love
2015	This Repeated Sodomy	—	—	Non-album single
2016	Swedish Guns	—	—	Running Out of Love
2016	We Got Game	—	—	Running Out of Love
2017	Teach Me To Forget	—	—	Running Out of Love
2018	Your True Name	—	—	Non-album single
2018	Going Down Swinging	—	—	Non-album single
2020	The Absence of Birds	—	—	Non-album single
2020	You Fear the Wrong Thing Baby	—	—	Non-album single
"—" denotes a title that was not released or did not chart in that territory.

== Other appearances ==
=== Compilation appearances ===
The Radio Dept. have made 40 compilation appearances since 2002.

Year	Song(s)	Album	Notes
2002	"Why Won't You Talk About It?"	Sonically Speaking (Vol 6: April 2002)	Compilation disc with Sweden's Sonic magazine.
2002	"Why Won't You Talk About It?" "Against The Tide"	The Sound of Young Sweden: Volume 3	Third volume of Labrador promotional compilations.
2002	"Where Damage Isn't Already Done"	Sonically Speaking (Vol 9: December 2002)	Compilation disc with Sweden's Sonic magazine.
2002	"Against The Tide"	EMA Telstar Motor Luger 2003	Compilation released by EMA Telstar, a Swedish booking agency.
2002	"Slottet"	Friendly People Making Noise	Compilation released by Swedish indie label, Friendly Noise.
2002	"Lean Back, Lean Forward"	Mjuk I Mössan	Compilation released by Swedish label, Absurd Records.
2004	"Where Damage Isn't Already Done"	Åtömström – The Great Röck'n'Röll Svendle, Part One	German release by The Atomic Café label.
2004	"Brobygatan" "Lost And Found (Mont Ventoux's Vänersborg All-Nighter Edit)"	Monotoni #1	Compilation released by indie Swedish label, Monotoni.
2004	"The Hideaway Pt.1"	Är Jag Förändrad Eller Är Jag Ny?	Independent compilation of music from Malmö's pop scene.
2004	"Pulling Our Weight"	Labrador Kingsize: Volume 2	Second volume of Labrador promotional compilations.
2004	"Where Damage Isn't Already Done"	XL Recordings: Summer Sampler 2004	Compilation album released by English label XL Recordings.
2004	"1995"	Accelerator	Compilation released by Swedish label Startracks.
2005	"Pulling Our Weight"	Rare Trax 41: Clouds Like Sugar	Germany only compilation released with Rolling Stone magazine.
2006	"Tell"	Sonically Speaking Vol 28: April 2006	Compilation disc with Sweden's Sonic magazine.
2006	"This Past Week"	Last Exit	Compilation disc with Sonik magazine, a Greek music magazine.
2006	"Pet Grief"	Now Hear This! #46	Compilation released with Word magazine.
2006	"Against The Tide"	Svensk Indie 1988–2006 – En Kärleks Historia	Compilation by North of No South Records.
2006	"The Worst Taste in Music"	Play Station (#07'06)	Compilation disc with Russia's Play magazine.
2006	"The Worst Taste in Music"	Soundvenue Magazine Sampler #6	Compilation released with Danish Soundvenue magazine.
2006	"Mad About The Boy"	Are You Scared To Get Happy?	Friendly Noise compilation.
2006	"Pulling Our Weight" "Worst Taste in Music"	Vacaciones En Suecia	Sampler CD released by Peruvian record label Revista 69 and Labrador.
2007	"Against The Tide" "Why Won't You Talk About It?" "Where Damage Isn't Already Done" "Deliverance" "Pulling Our Weight" "Worst Taste in Music" "Pet Grief" "We Made The Team"	Labrador 100: A Complete History of Popular Music	Labrador compilation celebrating nine years as a label and their 100th release.
2007	"I Wanted You To Feel The Same"	Manifest 2007 - Sveriges Oberoende Musikpris 5 År	Three-disc compilation album by Swedish indie label, Manifest.
2007	"Bachelor Kisses"	I Godan Ro	Download only compilation EP by Friendly Noise.
2008	"Closing Scene"	Sunday in Bed 2	Compilation album by German label Clubstar.
2008	"Freddie and the Trojan Horse"	Ice & Snow: A Swedish Pop Compilation	A Labrador / Universal release of Swedish music for the Philippines.
2008	"Freddie and the Trojan Horse"	Thank You for the Music	Compilation of Scandinavian music by Licking Fingers Records.
2008	"Bachelor Kisses"	Splendid Isolation	Friendly Noise compilation.
2008	"Mad About The Boy"	Are You Scared To Get Happy?	Friendly Noise compilation.
2010	"Heaven's on Fire"	Record Store Day	Promotional CD for Record Store Day by Border Music.
2010	"Heaven's on Fire"	Summer Sounds Sampler	CD sampler by EMI France.
2010	"Heaven's on Fire"	Sunny Side Up 10	CD sampler by EMI Australia.
2010	"Never Follow Suit"	Sonically Speaking Vol 52: April 2010	Compilation disc with Sweden's Sonic magazine.
2010	"David"	Новая Поп-Музыка Из Скандинавии	Compilation CD with Russia's Stereo & Video magazine.
2011	"Bachelor Kisses"	Sampler Digital - Janvier 2011	Digital compilation by France's Magic magazine.
2011	"Heaven's on Fire" "Never Follow Suit"	Stockholm Belongs To Us	Compilation album by Labrador.
2011	"Heaven's on Fire"	Sunday in Bed 4	Compilation album by German label Clubstar.
2011	"Heaven's on Fire"	Sonik & Myspace Present: 39 Best Indie & Electro Tracks of 2010	Compilation disc with Sonik magazine, a Greek music magazine.
2011	"The New Improved Hypocrisy"	Now Hear This! #97	Compilation released with Word magazine.
2012	"I Don't Need Love, I Got My Band"	Twee Grrrls Club Mixtape 2012	Cassette only compilation on the Pit Pony label.
2015	"It Looked Like Heaven (But Feels Like Hell)"	Sampler Digital - Juin 2015	Digital compilation by France's Magic magazine.

=== Soundtrack appearances ===
The Radio Dept.'s music has appeared in four film soundtracks throughout their career, most notably on Sofia Coppola's Marie Antoinette.

Year	Song(s)	Film
2004	"Bus" "Ewan"	Fjorton Suger
2006	"Pulling Our Weight" "I Don't Like It Like This" "Keen on Boys"	Marie Antoinette
2011	"Closing Scene"	Like Crazy
2014	"Strange Things Will Happen"	The Fault in Our Stars

=== Other songs ===
Year	Song(s)	Notes
2016	"I'm Walking on Air"	Also released as a solo recording by guitarist/bassist Martin Carlberg.
