= KittyWu Records =

Singapore-based record label

KittyWu Records is a Singapore-based record label, specializing in shoegaze, instrumental rock and electronic pop. KittyWu Records also acts as an independent concert promoter. KittyWu Records was founded in 2007 by Errol Tan and Lesley Chew.

== Bands on KittyWu Records ==
- I Am David Sparkle, Singapore
- Deepset, Malaysia
- Amateur Takes Control, Singapore
- Monster Cat, Singapore

== Releases on KittyWu Records ==
- KWR001 I Am David Sparkle - "This Is The New"
- KWR002 Deepset - "The Light We Shed Shall Burn Your Eyes"
- KWR003 Amateur Takes Control - "You, Me and the Things Unsaid"

== Concerts Produced by KittyWu Records ==
- Labrador Asian Tour featuring Club 8 & Pelle Carlberg (Jan 2007, Singapore)
- Explosions in the Sky KL Tour co-produced with Soundscape Records (Feb 2007, Kuala Lumpur Malaysia)
- MONO Live in Singapore (July 2008, Singapore)
- toe Live in KL (September 2008, Kuala Lumpur Malaysia)

== See also ==
- I Am David Sparkle
- Labrador Records
