= Bachelor Kisses =

- 7-inch single cover

Single by the Go-Betweens

from the album Spring Hill Fair
- A-side: "Bachelor Kisses"
- B-side: "Rare Breed"
- Released: November 1984
- Recorded: May 1984
- Studio: Miraval, Le Val, France
- Genre: Rock; jangle pop; indie pop
- Length: 3:33
- Label: Sire
- Songwriter(s): Grant McLennan; Robert Forster
- Producer(s): Colin Fairley; Robert Andrews

The Go-Betweens singles chronology
"Part Company" (1984)	"Bachelor Kisses" (1984)	"Spring Rain" (1986)

"Bachelor Kisses" is a song by the Australian alternative rock band the Go-Betweens that was released as the second single from their third album Spring Hill Fair in 1984. The single was issued in the UK and Australia on Sire Records. "Bachelor Kisses" was the Go-Betweens' first real attempt at a commercial single.

== History ==
The Go-Betweens' co-founder Robert Forster later said of the song, "Grant wrote this. It sounded like a pop song right from the word go. He was a very, very melodic songwriter. 'Bachelor Kisses' was just something that rolled off and felt very natural and beautiful. It's amazing." The band's other co-founder, Grant McLennan, said, "I'm sorry if it sounds a courtly song but it's not about that. I see a lot of infidelity around me most people involved in music are guilty of it in many cases. I see a lot of trust, promises being broken – I'm guilty of it myself. It's about all the promises the world of men have made women as far as the future of their lives, security, the raising of children, and I've found it wanting. Not a unique thought."

Originally recorded with John Brand with the other songs on Spring Hill Fair, the song was re-recorded with producers Colin Fairley and Robert Andrews for the single release at the insistence of the record label. Forster complained of, "new producers, more days on the bass drum, and a version of the song of no great variance to the Miraval take." Vickers later said the separate recording "effects the album" and would have preferred using the original. The song features backing vocals from Ana da Silva, the lead singer for British post-punk band the Raincoats.

The single and the album failed to chart in the UK or Australia resulting in the band being dropped by Sire Records. "Bachelor Kisses" was however voted in at No. 72 in Triple J's Hottest 100 for 1989.

Sire paid for a promotional video, featuring the band miming mixed with beach scenes. Forster said, "the black-and-white stuff of the band playing is actually very, very good. Then we shot some stuff, down at Brighton, of the water and stuff. They can print up colours. And they just went mad."

== Reception ==
We came back from Christmas in New York having lost our record company [Rough Trade] somewhere along the way. I wrote this in immigration having been refused entry to the United Kingdom. The first person who heard the song was my sister. She said that Marianne Faithfull should sing it.

— Grant McLennan

In a review of the song on Allmusic, Ned Raggett, comments that such a comparison is both worthwhile and not misplaced. He goes on to state that the song "has the rich, world-weary beauty one might expect from that singer in her 1980s work, but the song is very much a Go-Betweens song through and through. There's the same gentle but clear tension in the rhythm section, the crystalline but never overbearing guitar, the sense of deeper roots but a clearly modern performance"

In Mat Snow's review in the October, 1984 edition of NME he states "Only when we're confronted with a song so perfectly turned, lines so finely balanced and a melody so achingly sweet as Bachelor Kisses are we forced to notice how hollow most contemporary pop rings." Elsewhere in NME, Biba Kopf called the song, "an affecting male rejoinder to "Diamonds Are a Girl's Best Friend".

== Track listing ==
All tracks are written by G. McLennan, R. Forster

7" vinyl version
No.	Title	Length
1.	"Bachelor Kisses"	3:33
2.	"Rare Breed"	2:53
Total length:		6:26

All tracks are written by G. McLennan, R. Forster

12" vinyl version
No.	Title	Length
1.	"Bachelor Kisses"	3:33
2.	"Rare Breed"	2:53
3.	"Unkind and Unwise" (instrumental)	3:02
Total length:		9:28

== Personnel ==
=== Go-Betweens ===
- Robert Forster — vocals, guitar
- Grant McLennan — vocals, guitar
- Lindy Morrison — drums
- Robert Vickers – bass

=== Additional musicians ===
- Robert Andrews – keyboards
- Ana da Silva — backing vocals

== Release history ==
Year	Country	Label	Format	Catalogue No.
November 1984	UK	Sire Records	7" single	W 9156
November 1984	UK	Sire Records	12" single	W 9156 T
November 1984	AUS	Sire Records	7" single	7-29156

== Covers ==
Swedish band, The Radio Dept., recorded an exclusive cover of "Bachelor Kisses", for the August 2007 issue of the Swedish fanzine I Godan Ro. Only 10 copies of that issue were printed. The track was subsequently included in their compilation album Passive Aggressive: Singles 2002–2010.
