= 3 (Suburban Kids with Biblical Names album) =

#3

Studio album by Suburban Kids with Biblical Names
- Released: October 18, 2005
- Genre: Indie pop
- Length: 35:18
- Labels: Labrador; Minty Fresh; Yesboyicecream

Suburban Kids with Biblical Names chronology
| #2 (2005) | #3 (2005) | #4 (2009) |

#3 is the debut studio album by Swedish indie pop band Suburban Kids with Biblical Names. It is their third release overall, following the #1 and #2 EP releases, and their first and only release in the United States and United Kingdom.

== Sound and composition ==
The album has been described as indie pop. The album uses a wide variety of instrumentation in its sound, with AllMusic referring to them having "no respect for musical boundaries" with utilizing "...African-styled highlife-guitars, electronic beats, and ukuleles...they combine Kraftwerk-styled percussion with a guitar that sounds exactly like Hank Marvin anno 1960". Exclaim! compared the album's sound to the work of Jens Lekman and the Acid House Kings, while NME's Rebecca Robinson called it a "lush folk pop album that wouldn’t appear out of place in Sufjan Stevens’ personal CD collection."

== Release and promotion ==
It was first released domestically on October 18, 2005, by Labrador Records, and was subsequently released in the United States by Minty Fresh and the United Kingdom and Ireland by Yesboyicecream Records. The release was their only in the United States and United Kingdom.

The song "Rent a Wreck" from #3 is featured in the Toyota Prius "Yes" commercial. It was also included in the Labrador Records retrospective compilation album Labrador 100: A Complete History of Popular Music, released in celebration of the label's tenth year of existence and 100th release in that timeframe.

== Reception ==
Professional ratings
Review scores
| Source | Rating |
|---|---|
| Allmusic | 4/5 stars |
| Exclaim! | (Favorable) |

The album was generally well received. AllMusic praised the diversity of sound and witty lyrics of the album, concluding that "[t]here's nothing amateurish about the kids' performance at any point; in fact, the instrumental performances and the creative and crystal clear production are among the most impressive things about this album. Seldom do debut albums come as truly wonderful as this one. [...] don't let the spectacles and the wit fool you." Exclaim! was less impressed by the silliness and wit to the lyrics, but ultimately concluded that "[t]hey definitely don't take themselves too seriously, and that could prove to be a problem if they continue this far too precious playfulness because sometimes a little bit of twee-ness goes a long, long way. Fortunately they manage to stay just on the right side of the line this time and #3 is yet another great Swedish indie pop record." PopMatters particularly noted that the lyrics of "Rent a Wreck" made for a "memorable tour song", while NME called "Loop Duplicate My Heart" a "cult hit-in-the-making".

== Track listing ==
| No. | Title | Length |
|---|---|---|
| 1. | "Marry Me" | 2:18 |
| 2. | "Loop Duplicate My Heart" | 3:07 |
| 3. | "A Couple of Instruments" | 3:12 |
| 4. | "Parakit" | 2:56 |
| 5. | "Trees and Squirrels" | 3:18 |
| 6. | "Funeral Face" | 2:58 |
| 7. | "Noodles" | 2:48 |
| 8. | "Peter's Dream" | 2:52 |
| 9. | "Shitty Weekend" | 2:43 |
| 10. | "Rent a Wreck" | 2:54 |
| 11. | "Seems to Be on My Mind" | 2:51 |
| 12. | "Little Boys in the Ghetto" | 3:21 |

US and UK bonus tracks
| No. | Title | Length |
|---|---|---|
| 13. | "Love Will" | 3:08 |
| 14. | "Trumpets and Violins" | 2:50 |
