= Passive Aggressive: Singles 2002–2010 =

Compilation album by The Radio Dept.
- Released: January 25, 2011
- Recorded: 2002–2010
- Genre: Indie pop
- Length: 48:29; 40:49
- Label: Labrador
- Producers: Johan Duncansson, Martin Larsson

The Radio Dept. chronology
Clinging to a Scheme (2010)	Passive Aggressive: Singles 2002–2010 (2011)	Running out of Love (2016)

Professional ratings
Aggregate scores
Source	Rating
Metacritic	84/100
Review scores
Source	Rating
AllMusic	4/5 stars
CHARTattack	4/5 stars
Coke Machine Glow	77%
Pitchfork Media	8.2/10
PopMatters	8/10
Washington Post	(Favourable)

Passive Aggressive: Singles 2002–2010 is a compilation album by The Radio Dept. It was released in double CD and vinyl formats on January 25, 2011.

It features a disc of all the band's singles released to date, from all of their three previous LPs and stand-alone and online-only singles such as "Anne Laurie" and "The New Improved Hypocrisy." A second disc of B-sides and rarities is also included.

== Track listing ==
Disc One
No.	Title	Length
1.	"Why Won't You Talk About It?" (from Lesser Matters)	3:10
2.	"Where Damage Isn't Already Done" (from Lesser Matters)	2:47
3.	"Annie Laurie" (self-released CD-R EP)	2:54
4.	"Ewan" (from Lesser Matters)	2:25
5.	"Pulling Our Weight" (from the Pulling Our Weight EP released on Labrador)	3:23
6.	"This Past Week" (from the This Past Week EP released on Labrador)	5:14
7.	"The Worst Taste in Music" (from Pet Grief)	2:53
8.	"We Made the Team" (online-only single released on Labrador)	3:30
9.	"Bachelor Kisses" (from the Splendid Isolation compilation released on Friendly Noise Records)	3:43
10.	"Freddie and the Trojan Horse" (from the Freddie and the Trojan Horse EP released on Labrador)	3:13
11.	"David" (from Clinging to a Scheme)	3:31
12.	"Heaven's on Fire" (from Clinging to a Scheme)	3:34
13.	"Never Follow Suit" (from Clinging to a Scheme)	4:09
14.	"The New Improved Hypocrisy" (online-only single released on Labrador)	4:03

Disc Two
No.	Title	Length
1.	"Liebling" (B-side from Why Won't You Talk About It? single)	2:53
2.	"We Would Fall Against the Tide" (B-side from Why Won't You Talk About It? single)	3:19
3.	"You and Me Then?" (from the Where Damage Isn't Already Done EP)	1:27
4.	"Peace of Mind" (from the Where Damage Isn't Already Done EP)	3:27
5.	"Tåget" (from the Annie Laurie EP)	0:56
6.	"Slottet" (B-side from Ewan single)	2:58
7.	"What You Sell" (B-side from The Worst Taste in Music single)	3:10
8.	"Mad About the Boy" (from the Are You Scared to Get Happy? compilation by Friendly Noise Records)	3:27
9.	"Closing Scene" (from the Freddie and the Trojan Horse EP)	4:16
10.	"Messy Enough" (B-side from David single)	3:26
11.	"The Idle Urban Contemporaries" (B-side from David single)	1:57
12.	"All About Our Love" (B-side from Heaven's on Fire single)	3:13
13.	"On Your Side" (from the Never Follow Suit EP)	3:15
14.	"The One" (from the Never Follow Suit EP)	3:05
