= Amanda Mair =

Swedish singer and musician (born 1994)

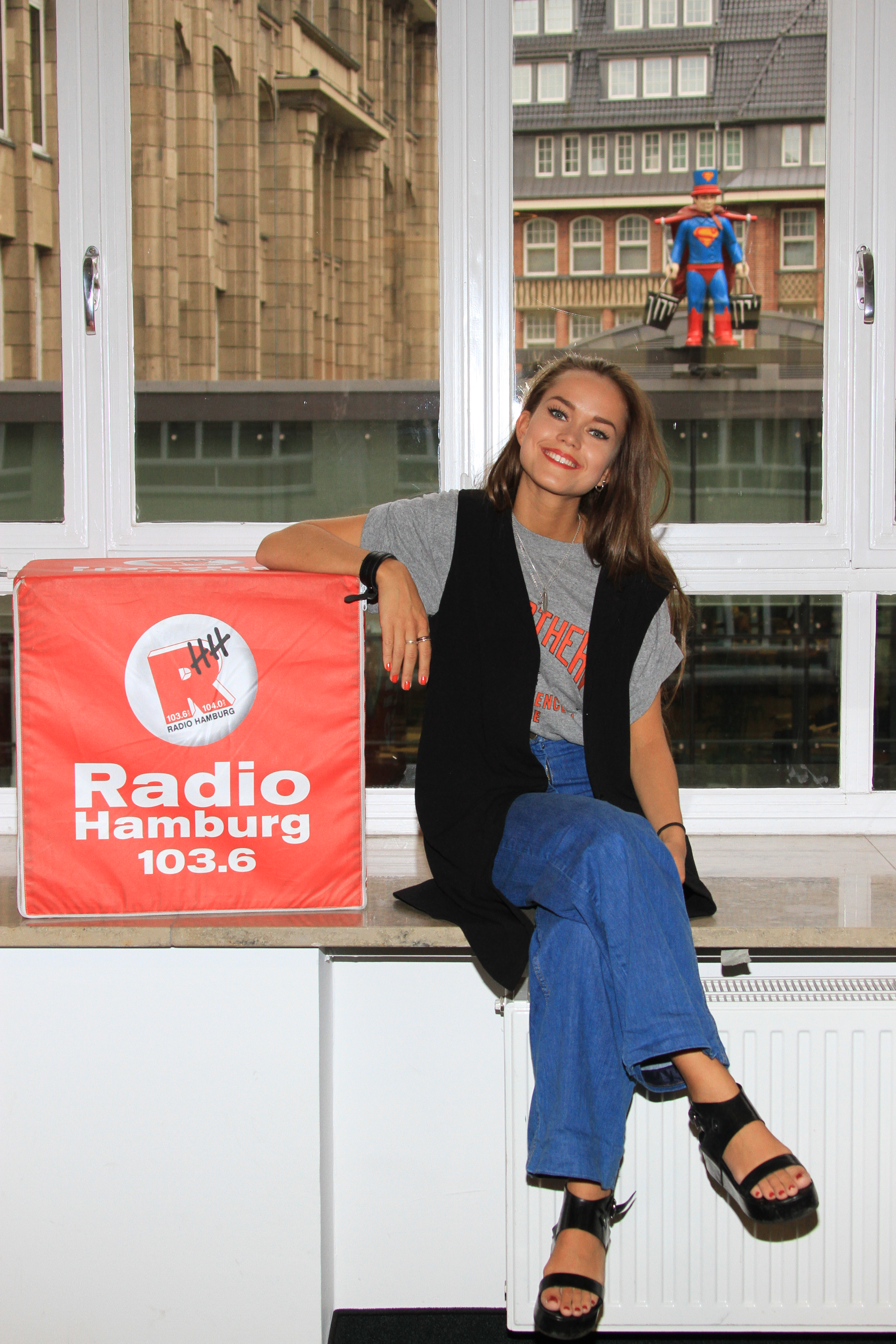
- Amanda Mair (2012)

Background information
- Born: Amanda Ulrika Magdalena Mair; 14 June 1994 (age 32)
- Origin: Stockholm, Sweden
- Genres: Indie pop, pop music
- Occupations: Singer-songwriter, pianist
- Instrument: Piano
- Years active: 2010–present
- Label: Despotz Records
- Website: www.amandamair.nu

Amanda Ulrika Magdalena Mair (pronounced "Mayer") (born 14 June 1994) is a Swedish singer and musician. She released her self-titled debut album in 2012. Her music has been profiled by various publications including Elle, Seventeen, and Billboard in the United States. Her musical style is frequently compared to Kate Bush.

== Early life ==
Amanda Mair was raised in Lidingö, Sweden, an island outside Stockholm. Her parents own a bakery. Her mother is Finnish and her father is Austrian. Mair has two older sisters and an older half-brother. Her sisters, who also sang and played instruments, influenced her music tastes during childhood. She studied at the Rytmus Musikergymnasiet, a performing arts school in Stockholm.

== Music career ==
=== Early beginnings and debut album (2011 to 2013) ===
At 14, Mair's mother asked if she would be interested in recording songs with the intention of sending them to family. Through her sister's boyfriend, Mair got in contact with Tom, the drummer from the Swedish band, Club 8, and recorded material. She recorded three songs: Your Song by Elton John, Hallelujah, and Samson by Regina Spektor and did not release them commercially. Two years later, she received a phone call from Tom, who had previously played her demo to the owner of the indie label, Labrador Records. Mair was later invited to a meeting and signed with the label in 2010.

Her debut single called "House" was released on 8 June 2011. The single was met with positive reviews and Mair gained international attention from The Washington Post'', who wrote, "The 16 (yes, 16)-year-old Mair sounds more like Kate Bush on her gorgeous, grown-up's debut track than Kate Bush herself". The publication Poplight considered "House" to one of the best songs of 2011. Aftonbladet joined in the chorus of praise, and wrote, "The best Kate Bush style synth pop since Bat for Lashes." Because she was underage and performed mostly in night clubs, her parents accompanied her during gigs.

Her second single, "Doubt", was released October 2011 and was also well received. The publication Poplight named it "Song of the Day" for a full week. After appearances on Swedish television networks like TV4 and Kanal 5, and events like "julkalender" (Christmas Calendar) organized by Dagens Nyheter and in Rockbjörnen festival, she released her third single "Sense."

Her self-titled debut album Amanda Mair released in Sweden on 15 February 2012. It was produced by Philip Ekström from the group The Mary Onettes. The album peaked at number 16 on the Swedish album charts. The album was later released in the US on 5 June 2012 and is available worldwide on iTunes. In 2011 and 2012, Mair embarked on a tour throughout Sweden, the UK, and Europe to promote her album. Mair performed her debut US show in New York City on 12 April 2012.

During 2013 Mair performed a series of concerts in Shanghai and Beijing, China, Spain, and Sweden to promote her debut album. In February 2013, she was the opening act for Germany, Switzerland, and Austria legs of tour for the Swedish band, Friska Viljor. Beginning in late September 2013, she participated in a 1950s music showcase, performing cover songs as a member of Swedish musician, Peter Jezewski's show, "Be Bop A Luba". She performed a Christmas themed version of the show in November and December 2014. In August 2014, she was invited to perform at an event celebrating Swedish Midsummer in Dallas, Texas. On 5 September 2014 she performed at a fall festival concert in Richmond, Virginia. In October 2014, she recorded vocals for Swedish musician, Azure Blue's upcoming single. The song, "A Town Like Alice", appears on Azure Blue's album, "Beneath the Hill I Smell the Sea". The album was released for digital download on 13 May 2015.

=== Return to music: 2014 to present ===
In July 2014, Mair announced to fans via her official Twitter account that she was in the studio recording material. On 15 April 2016 Mair announced the release of her lead single, "Wednesday", her first solo release in nearly 4 years. The single is a part of an EP. The music video for "Wednesday" premiered on 21 April 2016.

In May 2017, Mair signed with an independent record label and began working on a follow-up release to her debut album. In October, she returned to music with a double re-release of her two singles, "Rush" and "Wednesday". On 27 October 2017, she released the song, "Empty Blockings" for streaming platforms. Her EP, "To the Moon", was released worldwide for streaming on 17 November 2017.

=== Other music ventures ===
During the summer and early fall of 2014, she performed as a member of a quartet called "Symphony for the People". They recorded the demo, "Background Noise" in March of that same year and performed at several events in Sweden. In 2015, Mair, Pernilla Söderblom, Fanny Heikman, and Kerstin Ljungström decided to rename their band, "Vo PAM", which was previously known as "Symphony for the People". The performed at music festivals across Sweden in the summers of 2014 and 2015. Their first single, "Background Noise", was released as a digital download on 2 February 2016. Vo PAM later released a 4-track EP, "Human", on 9 March 2016 for digital download. Mair plays piano and shares lead vocals on the EP. Mair's participation in the band ended in late 2016

== Personal life ==
Mair resides in Stockholm. She speaks fluent English and Swedish. She announced via her Instagram page in October 2023 that her first child, a son, was born in Sweden in September 2023.

== Discography ==
=== Solo Studio Album ===
Year
Album
Peak chart positions
Notes
SWE

2012
Amanda Mair
16

No.	Title	Length
1.	"Said and Done"	3:53
2.	"Doubt"	3:29
3.	"House"	4:00
4.	"Sense"	3:31
5.	"Skinnarviksberget"	3:17
6.	"Before"	3:22
7.	"It's Gonna Be Long"	3:34
8.	"What Do You Want"	3:09
9.	"You've Been Here Before"	2:37
10.	"Leaving Early"	3:34

=== Solo EP ===
Year	Album	Peak chart positions	Notes
Year	Album	SWE	Notes
2017	To the Moon		

=== Solo Singles ===
- 2011: "House"
- 2011: "Doubt"
- 2012: "Sense"
- 2016: "Wednesday"
- 2017: "Wednesday/"Rush" (rerelease)
- 2017: "Empty Blockings"

=== As a member of Vo PAM ===
Singles

- 2015: "Background Noise"

EP

- 2016: Human

As a featured artist

- 2015: "A Town Called Alice" (Azure Blue feat. Amanda Mair)
- 2017: "Ghost" (Novah feat. Amanda Mair)

=== Music videos ===
- 2012: "House"
- 2012: "Doubt"
- 2016: "Background Noise" (as a member of Vo PAM)
- 2016: "Wednesday"
- 2017: "Empty Blockings"
