= Like Crazy (soundtrack) =

Like Crazy: Music from the Motion Picture is the soundtrack to the 2011 film Like Crazy, released by Relativity Music Group on October 26, 2011. The album consisted of songs by Paul Simon, M83, Stars, The Mary Onettes and Figurine. An album containing the original score composed by pianist Dustin O'Halloran was released on the same date.

== Like Crazy: Music from the Motion Picture ==
Like Crazy: Music from the Motion Picture

Soundtrack album by various artists
- Released: October 26, 2011
- Length: 51:30
- Label: Relativity

While developing the film's story Doremus listened to several of the music from Paul Simon, M83, and various bands and artists, serving as the fabric of the film. He then assembled the similar set of songs on a CD and gave to the lead actors Felicity Jones and Anton Yelchin and rest of the cast and crew to listen throughout production. The music helped those actors dive into the characters, as Yelchin said "I tend to be very cynical and coldhearted about love stories, but the CD really got to me".

=== Track listing ===
No.	Title	Artist	Length
1.	"Arrivals N.2"	Dustin O'Halloran	1:53
2.	"Crazy Love, Vol. II"	Paul Simon	4:19
3.	"We Float"	Dustin O'Halloran	1:27
4.	"Departures N.1"	Dustin O'Halloran	1:51
5.	"Century"	The Mary Onettes	4:37
6.	"Fragile N.4"	Dustin O'Halloran	3:28
7.	"IMpossible"	Figurine	4:10
8.	"Surprise Hotel"	Fool's Gold	6:48
9.	"I Guess I'm Floating"	M83	1:54
10.	"We Move Lightly"	Dustin O'Halloran	3:08
11.	"Opus 37"	Dustin O'Halloran	5:18
12.	"Dead Hearts"	Stars	3:28
13.	"Thursday" (Bonus track)	Asobi Seksu	4:17
14.	"Closing Scene" (Bonus track)	The Radio Dept.	4:15
Total length:			51:30

=== Reception ===
Andrew O'Hehir of Salon.com complimented the soundtrack choices setting the mood for the film. Jenna R. Overton of The Harvard Crimson praised the "several slow soundtrack ballads throughout the ups and downs of their relationship to keep the tears flowing". Maggie Liu of The Tech wrote "The soundtrack usually consists of instrumentals with sparse or barely heard lyrics". IndieWire ranked it as one among the "Best Film Soundtracks of 2011".

== Like Crazy: The Score ==
Like Crazy: The Score

Film score by Dustin O'Halloran
- Released: October 26, 2011
- Genre: Film score
- Length: 40:46
- Label: Relativity Music Group
- Producer: Dustin O'Halloran

Dustin O'Halloran chronology
Want to See Something? (2010)	Like Crazy (2011)	The Other Dream Team (2012)

=== Track listing ===
No.	Title	Length
1.	"Arrivals N.2"	1:57
2.	"Campus Walk"	1:13
3.	"We Move Lightly"	3:10
4.	"We Float"	1:31
5.	"Fragile N.4"	3:29
6.	"Departures N.1"	1:55
7.	"Twin Stars"	3:57
8.	"Arrivals N.1"	1:23
9.	"Nothing Between Us"	0:46
10.	"Questions"	1:14
11.	"Opus 55"	6:05
12.	"So Close, So Far"	1:00
13.	"I Carry You With Me"	0:59
14.	"Opus 26"	3:19
15.	"With This Ring"	2:35
16.	"Without You I Am A Lie"	0:51
17.	"Opus 37"	5:22
Total length:		40:46

=== Reception ===
Dan Mecca of The Film Stage called it as a "solid, piano-heavy score". Derrick Bang of The Davis Enterprise wrote "Dustin O’Halloran’s spare, evocative, piano-based score is the final graceful touch: the perfect complement to the highs and lows of this tender, fragile love affair." Ian Forbes of Showbiz Junkies commented that the score "perfectly complements the tone of the film". IndieWire also ranked the score as one among the "Best Film Scores of 2011"; Oliver Lyletton called his work as "introspective, bittersweet and devastating, capturing snapshot emotions of fear, hope, worry and longing all in a beautifully fragile work of tender and melancholy piano."

O'Halloran's score was longlisted for the Academy Award for Best Original Score along with 97 other contenders for the 84th Academy Awards, but failed to get nominated.
