= The Legends (Swedish band) =

Swedish pop band

- Origin: Sweden
- Genres: Indie pop
- Years active: 2003–present
- Labels: Labrador
- Members: Johan Angergård

The Legends are a Swedish pop band whose music is distributed by Lakeshore Records in the US, by Labrador in Sweden, and by Little Teddy in Germany. The band was formed in January 2003, and a week later, a gig was booked, supporting The Radio Dept. in Stockholm.

The Legends received international acclaim for their debut album, Up Against the Legends, released in 2003. Allmusic described it as characterized by melodic songwriting reminiscent of both the 1980s, the UK's C86 movement, as well as 1960s American pop-rock, and summarized the album as "the kind of stunning debut that makes you excited about the possibilities of pop music." The band have since issued four EPs and five additional studio albums.

The group is the brainchild of Johan Angergård, Labrador Records founder and member of Swedish bands Club 8 and Acid House Kings.

== Discography ==
=== Studio albums ===
- Up Against the Legends (2003)
- Public Radio (2005)
- Facts and Figures (2006)
- Over and Over (2009)
- It's Love (2015)
- Nightshift (2017)

=== EPs ===
- There and Back Again (2004)
- Call It Ours (2004)
- He Knows the Sun (2005)
- Hide Away (2006)

=== Singles ===
- "Make It All Right" (2003)
- "Play It for Today" (2006)
- "Lucky Star" (2006)
- "Seconds Away" (2008)
