= Mondays Are Like Tuesdays and Tuesdays Are Like Wednesdays =

Studio album by Acid House Kings
- Released: 19 August 2002
- Recorded: 2001
- Studio: Summersound Studios (Stockholm)
- Genre: Indie pop
- Length: 35:00
- Label: Labrador; Hidden Agenda
- Producer: Johan Angergård; Niklas Angergård

Acid House Kings chronology
Advantage Acid House Kings (1997)	Mondays Are Like Tuesdays and Tuesdays Are Like Wednesdays (2002)	Sing Along with Acid House Kings (2005)

Singles from Mondays Are Like Tuesdays and Tuesdays Are Like Wednesdays
- 1. "Say Yes If You Love Me" Released: 23 October 2002

Professional ratings
Review scores
Source	Rating
AllMusic	4/5 stars

Mondays Are Like Tuesdays and Tuesdays Are Like Wednesdays is the third studio album by Swedish indie pop band Acid House Kings. It was released on 19 August 2002 by Labrador Records and Hidden Agenda Records.

== Track listing ==
All tracks are written by Johan Angergård and Niklas Angergård

No.	Title	Length
1.	"Sunday Morning"	3:13
2.	"Start Anew"	2:38
3.	"She Keeps Hoping"	3:04
4.	"Brown and Beige Are My Favourite Colours"	2:53
5.	"This Love Is All We Need"	1:52
6.	"Summer's on Its Way"	2:33
7.	"Swedish Hearts"	3:09
8.	"You're a Beautiful Loser"	3:00
9.	"A New Day, A New Career"	3:40
10.	"Say Yes If You Love Me"	3:04
11.	"Mondays Are Like Tuesdays"	2:55
12.	"One Two Three Four"	2:59
Total length:		35:00

== Personnel ==
Credits for Mondays Are Like Tuesdays and Tuesdays Are Like Wednesdays adapted from album liner notes.

Acid House Kings

- Johan Angergård – bass, guitar, keyboards, production
- Niklas Angergård – vocals, guitar, keyboards, production
- Julia Lannerheim – vocals

Additional musicians

- Tobias Einestad – trumpet

Artwork and design

- Ballaleica.com – photography
- Lukas Möllersten – design
