= Above the City (Club 8 album) =

Studio album by Club 8
- Released: 21 May 2013
- Genre: Indie pop
- Length: 39:12
- Label: Labrador Records
- Producer: Angergård

Club 8 chronology
The People's Record (2010)	Above the City (2013)	Pleasure (2015)

Above the City is the eighth studio album by Swedish band Club 8.

== Reception ==
Professional ratings
Aggregate scores
Source	Rating
Metacritic	74/100
Review scores
Source	Rating
AllMusic	4/5 stars
Blurt	4/5 stars
Drowned in Sound	7/10
Exclaim!	5/10
Pitchfork	7.6/10
PopMatters	6/10 stars
Under the Radar	7/10 stars

Above the City received positive reviews from critics. On Metacritic, the album holds a score of 74/100 based on 8 reviews, indicating "generally favorable reviews".

== Track listing ==
1. "Kill Kill Kill" - 03:25
2. "Stop Taking My Time" - 02:50
3. "You Could Be Anybody" - 04:08
4. "Run" - 03:38
5. "Interlude" - 00:56
6. "Hot Sun" - 03:25
7. "A Small Piece of Heaven" - 02:48
8. "I'm Not Gonna Grow Old" - 03:32
9. "Interlude #2" - 00:21
10. "Into Air" - 04:10
11. "Instrumental" - 01:15
12. "Travel" - 02:09
13. "Less than Love - 03:17
14. "Straight as an Arrow - 03:18
