= Music Sounds Better with You (disambiguation) =

"Music Sounds Better with You" is a 1998 single by Stardust.

Music Sounds Better with You may also refer to:

- Music Sounds Better with You (album), a 2011 album by Acid House Kings
- "Music Sounds Better with U", a 2011 song by Big Time Rush featuring Mann
