= Above the City =

Above the City may refer to:

- Above the City (Smoke or Fire album), 2005
- Above the City (Club 8 album), 2013
