= Saturday Night Engine =

Saturday Night Engine may refer to:

- Saturday Night Engine, a 1995 album recorded by Broder Daniel
- "Saturday Night Engine", a 2003 single recorded by Club 8
