= Islands (The Mary Onettes album) =

Studio album by The Mary Onettes
- Released: 4 November 2009
- Recorded: House Arrest Studio, Gothenburg; Foundland Studio, Jönköping
- Genre: Dream pop, indie rock
- Length: 42:22
- Language: English
- Label: Labrador (LAB125)
- Producer: Philip Ekström, Henrik Ekström

The Mary Onettes chronology
The Mary Onettes (2007)	Islands (2009)	Hit the Waves (2013)

Singles from Islands
- 1. "Dare" Released: 29 April 2009; 2. "Puzzles" Released: 30 September 2009; 3. "Once I Was Pretty" Released: 31 March 2010

Islands is the second studio album from Swedish dream pop band the Mary Onettes. The album was released on 3 November 2009 in the United States, and a day later in Sweden. The album had to be re-recorded from scratch after lead singer Philip Ekström stated on the band's official website, "...I basically lost every song I've ever recorded with the Mary Onettes. My hard drive with all my music was stolen in my car one fine afternoon in Stockholm, the very same fine afternoon we came home from our US tour, the very same day I was feeling thrilled to come home and start the process of finishing our new album. Of course I had made a backup copy on my computer at home. But for some reason a power failure in the building made that hard drive collapse too. Unbelievable. I was speechless for days." The band played the Primavera Sound Festival in Spain in May 2008, and reconvened in the studio to start the recording process again in September.

The band's Dare EP was released in April 2009, intended as a sampler of the Islands album. It featured two album tracks ("Dare" and "God Knows I Had Plans") and an exclusive non-album track ("Kicks"). Ekström said of the album's name: "The title Islands came up because I see the tracks on the album as small islands in different shapes and forms where every song is like a record of it's [sic] very own. Johan on Labrador Records suggested the same title without having heard me mentioning the idea, so that was a coincidence too good not to pursue. The songs are almost too personal and I've had a hard time playing them for friends. It's like all I want to do is keep them to myself".

== Reception ==
Professional ratings
Aggregate scores
Source	Rating
Metacritic	66/100
Review scores
Source	Rating
AllMusic	3/5 stars
The A.V. Club	B
Drowned in Sound	6/10
musicOMH	4/5 stars
Pitchfork	6.7/10
PopMatters	6/10 stars

Islands received mixed to positive reviews from critics. On Metacritic, the album holds a score of 66/100 based on 9 reviews, indicating "generally favorable reviews".

== Track listing ==
All tracks are written by Philip Ekström

No.	Title	Length
1.	"Puzzles"	4:32
2.	"Dare"	3:46
3.	"Once I Was Pretty"	4:13
4.	"Cry for Love"	3:58
5.	"The Disappearance of My Youth"	3:55
6.	"God Knows I Had Plans"	4:19
7.	"Symmetry"	3:58
8.	"Century"	4:37
9.	"Whatever Saves Me"	3:55
10.	"Bricks"	5:09

== Release history ==
Country	Date	Label	Format	Catalogue #
United States	3 November 2009	Labrador Records	CD	LAB125
Sweden	4 November 2009	Labrador Records	CD	LAB125
Sweden	16 December 2009	Labrador Records	LP (limited edition of 500 copies)	LAB125

== Credits ==
- All songs produced and recorded by Philip Ekström and Henrik Ekström.
- Recorded at the House Arrest Studio, Gothenburg, and Foundland Studio, Jönköping.
- Strings on tracks 1, 2, 3, 5, 7, 8 and 10 by Karin Hagström and Lina Molander. Arranged by Henrik Ekström and Philip Ekström.
- Backing vocals on "The Disappearance of My Youth" by Ebba Sahlin, Isa Almgren, Majja Sahlin, and Agnes Evertsson.
- Backing vocals on "Bricks" by Sara Mårtensson and Hanna-Maria Backvall.
- Mastered by Erik Broheden at Masters of Audio, except "Century" mastered by Björn Engelmann at Cutting Room Studios.
- Photos by Henrik Mårtensson; artwork by Peter Eriksson.
