= Spring Hill Fair =

Studio album by the Go-Betweens
- Released: 27 September 1984
- Recorded: May 1984
- Studio: Studio Miraval, Le Val, France
- Genre: Alternative rock, indie pop, jangle pop
- Length: 40:24
- Label: Sire
- Producer: John Brand

The Go-Betweens chronology
Before Hollywood (1983)	Spring Hill Fair (1984)	Liberty Belle and the Black Diamond Express (1986)

Singles from Spring Hill Fair
- 1. "Part Company" Released: August 1984; 2. "Bachelor Kisses" Released: November 1984

Spring Hill Fair is the Go-Betweens' third album, released on 27 September 1984 in the UK on Sire Records. The LP was recorded during a "very wet May" at Studio Miraval in Le Val, France. Prior to the recording of the album, bass player Robert Vickers had joined the group, enabling Grant McLennan to move to lead guitar. The original release consisted of ten songs. In 2002, Circus released an expanded CD which included a second disc of ten bonus tracks and a music video for the song "Bachelor Kisses".

== Details ==
The album was named after an annual fair in Spring Hill, Queensland, suburb of Brisbane Grammar School, band member Robert Forster's high school. Some of the band had also lived there in the early 1980s. Grant McLennan said of the title, "It was generally not that we were home sick, I think we just wanted to have, after Before Hollywood, which was so obviously an American kind of thing, a regional home-town thing." In another interview McLennan stated "we all lived there and the main reason was that in September, October of every year in Brisbane, there is, in Spring Hill, a fair, and as the album came out around then we thought it would be nice to have a parochial mention in a title because we hadn't done that for a long time."

McLennan and Forster later said that they were uninspired and felt the songs on their previous album had been better, with Forster saying they were more interested in, "sitting around drinking wine and eating rabbit! It definitely lacked 'the edge' of where we were before." They were also unhappy with the production, despite using the same producer as on Before Hollywood. McLennan said, "John Brand, the producer, he did change between the second and third, which we did as well, but he went and made a very produced 1984 English pop record, which in a way... well, that's not what we were." Forster more bluntly claimed, "John Brand was terrible. His whole attitude was, 'Now we're making a real record.'" Drummer Lindy Morrison said, "John was determined we'd have a hit and that shows."

Recording in France was much more expensive than their earlier recordings, with the Miraval studio booked for a month. Forster recalls that the band initially thought that they would set up and play in the recording studio in a similar way to how they had recorded Before Hollywood with Brand previously. About half the tracks had programmed rhythm tracks, leading to conflict between Brand and drummer Lindy Morrison. Morrison claimed the relationship had also soured after Brand attempted to seduce her and was rebuffed on their first day in the studio. Brand spent the first week trying to gate the drums and set click tracks, with the rest of the band feeling trapped. Furthermore, Morrison recalled the relationships within the band were poor. "They were fucked. There were little power struggles going on all over the place. We were a neurotic mess," she said. Forster indicated in hindsight that the band should have sacked Brand; however as Brand's manager had booked the studio on a deal, they felt compelled to proceed with him. Soon after the release, he said, "I'm firmly anti-producer now. For the life of me, I can't see their function."

Forster said of his writing, "The lyrics I wrote on this album, I wrote when I've been drinking. I wanted to speak a lot more directly and I wanted to speak about certain topics in a very straightforward way. And the best way I found of doing that was by sitting down and drinking. A conversational-type lyric. Most of the lyrics I've done on that album were started at night. I'd start drinking, smoking cigarettes, and I'd write all the lyrics in one sitting. I think it shows."

Defending accusations that the album was disjointed, McLennan said, "It's an album where we talked right from the start of Loaded or a White Album, where there would be different songs on the record, and I stand by that. I deny the allegations of scrappiness." In an interview in 2016 Forster takes a different view, stating "Grant was always perceived as the pop kid in the band, but he didn't pick the pop songs. At times I would try and sway him on material, because he had a lot more than me: I would have four or five songs for each album and he would have 15 or 20. But he chose avant-garde weirdness over pop."

The album features a number of guest musicians, more than any of the band's previous recordings, with Ana da Silva (the Raincoats) providing additional vocals on "Bachelor Kisses", Jacques Loussier (the owner of the recording studio) performing synthesizer on "Part Company", Graeme Pleeth on keyboards and brass, Denis Gautier on trumpet and Marc Fontana on saxophone.

The band's photograph for the album cover was taken at the Richmond Theatre in London by American photographer Sheila Rock.

The first single released was "Part Company" in August 1984, but it failed to make an impact on the charts. The second single, "Bachelor Kisses", was the band's first real attempt at a commercial single. Although Sire Records did not produce a music video for "Part Company", they did for "Bachelor Kisses", which was filmed in part at Brighton. "Bachelor Kisses" was voted in at No. 72 in Triple J's Hottest 100 for 1989.

== Critical reception ==
Professional ratings
Review scores
Source	Rating
AllMusic	4/5 stars
Chicago Tribune	3.5/4 stars
Entertainment Weekly	A
Now	5/5
Q	4/5 stars
The Rolling Stone Album Guide	3.5/5 stars
Select	4/5
Spin Alternative Record Guide	8/10
Uncut	4/5 stars
The Village Voice	A

Clinton Walker, writing in The Age newspaper, felt "the album as a whole was disappointing, disjointed and uneven." Helen FitzGerald was more enthusiastic in her review for Melody Maker, writing, "There's an endearing imperfection to this record, but it's a calculation of style rather than incompetence of design. In places, the vocals quaver dangerously as out-of-focus love songs paint a picture of the kind of melancholia that's impossible to forge." The songs were compared to sepia-toned photographs. Biba Kopf of NME said, "It would be silly to pretend the Go-Betweens are a sparkling fun experience – they are sometimes excessively sombre, verging on sobriety. They don't make for the easiest of entries, but the pleasures and rewards are longer lasting." NME ranked Spring Hill Fair at number 11 among the "Albums of the Year" for 1984. In 1996, Robert Christgau of The Village Voice gave the album an "A" rating.

Ned Raggett's review of the album on AllMusic states, "A slightly more conventional but no less entrancing collection of songs in comparison to Before Hollywood, Spring Hill Fair contains its fair share of Go-Betweens classics, with the rough, barbed emotional edge of many lyrics getting almost gentle arrangements." He added, "Throughout the album one can not only hear the expanded lineup testing things out, but individual players adding their own particular flair – the brush-and-shuffle percussion from Morrison on 'Five Words', McLennan's great lead guitar solo on 'You've Never Lived', Vickers' ability with crisp funk on 'Slow Slow Music'."

== Track listing ==
(All tracks written by Grant McLennan and Robert Forster)

No.	Title	Lyrics	Length
1.	"Bachelor Kisses" (Recorded, produced and engineered at Westside Studios, London - August 1984)	Grant McLennan	3:33
2.	"Five Words"	McLennan, Robert Forster	4:05
3.	"The Old Way Out"	Forster	3:41
4.	"You've Never Lived"	Forster	3:55
5.	"Part Company"	Forster	4:53
6.	"Slow Slow Music"	McLennan	3:05
7.	"Draining the Pool for You"	Forster	4:16
8.	"River of Money"	McLennan	5:10
9.	"Unkind and Unwise"	McLennan	3:05
10.	"Man O'Sand to Girl O'Sea"	Forster	4:41
Total length:			40:24

2002 bonus disc
No.	Title	Lyrics	Length
1.	"Emperor's Courtessan"	McLennan	2:23
2.	"Newton Told Me"	Forster	2:33
3.	"Just Right for Him"	McLennan	3:29
4.	"Attraction"	Forster	2:25
5.	"The Power That I Now Have"	McLennan	2:45
6.	"Second Hand Furniture"	Forster	4:13
7.	"Marco Polo Jr."	McLennan	4:12
8.	"Sweet Tasting Hours"	Forster	3:40
9.	"Unkind and Unwise" (Instrumental)		3:04
10.	"Bachelor Kisses" (video)	G. McLennan
Total length:			28:44

== Release history ==
Date	Region	Label	Format	Catalogue
27 September 1984	UK	Sire	LP	925 179–1
27 September 1984	AUS	Sire	LP	925 179–1
27 September 1984	AUS	Sire	Cassette	25179–4
March 1996	UK	Beggars Banquet	CD	BBL 2003 CD
March 1996	AUS	Silk Sheen	CD	SILK 004
2002	UK	Circus Records	CD	FYL011
2002	US	Jetset	CD	TWA48
2002	AUS	EMI Australia	CD	3696062
2014	AUS	EMI Australia	CD	3760985

== Personnel ==
The Go-Betweens

- Robert Forster — vocals, guitar
- Grant McLennan — vocals, guitar
- Lindy Morrison — drums, backing vocals
- Robert Vickers — bass guitar

Additional musicians

- Graeme Pleeth — keyboards, brass and string arrangements
- Denis Gautier — trumpet
- Marc Fontana — saxophone
- Ana da Silva — backing vocals on "Bachelor Kisses"

=== Production ===
- Engineer — Jacques Hermet
- Layout — Martyn Lambert
- Photography — Sheila Rock
- Producer, Engineer — John Brand
- Producer, Engineer — Colin Fairley ("Bachelor Kisses")
- Producer — Robert Andrews ("Bachelor Kisses")

== Bibliography ==
- Nichols, David (2005). The Go-Betweens. Verse Chorus Verse. ISBN 9781891241161.
