= The Mary Onettes (album) =

Studio album by The Mary Onettes
- Released: 25 April 2007
- Recorded: House Arrest Studios, Gothenburg
- Genre: Dream pop, indie rock
- Length: 40:41
- Language: English
- Label: Labrador
- Producer: Philip Ekström, Lars Malmros

The Mary Onettes chronology
The Mary Onettes (2007)	Islands (2009)

Singles from The Mary Onettes
- 1. "Lost" Released: 15 November 2006; 2. "Void" Released: 7 March 2007

Professional ratings
Review scores
Source	Rating
AllMusic	3/5 stars
Pitchfork	6.9/10
Treble magazine	(positive)

The Mary Onettes is the self-titled debut album from Swedish dream pop band the Mary Onettes. The album was released on 25 April 2007 in Sweden to generally positive critical acclaim and favorable comparisons to Echo & the Bunnymen, the Cure, the Church and Shout Out Louds. Treble magazine, in a highly positive review, described the album: "It may sound a bit on the nostalgic side, though its influences merely melt into a greater whole, in which various sounds meld together in synth-pop ecstasy". Two singles were released from the album: the Lost EP in November 2006, and "Void," which preceded the album in March 2007. A music video was also produced for the lead track, "Pleasure Songs".

== Track listing ==
All tracks are written by Philip Ekström

No.	Title	Length
1.	"Pleasure Songs"	4:26
2.	"Lost"	4:03
3.	"Void"	3:28
4.	"The Laughter"	5:25
5.	"Slow"	4:25
6.	"The Companion"	3:56
7.	"Explosions"	3:57
8.	"Henry"	4:06
9.	"Under the Guillotine"	3:23
10.	"Still"	3:39

== Release history ==
Country	Date	Label	Format	Catalogue #
Sweden	25 April 2007	Labrador Records	CD	LAB103
United States	4 December 2007	Labrador Records (distributed by Darla Records)	CD	LAB103
Worldwide	10 November 2017	Labrador Records	Vinyl LP	LAB103R
Worldwide	10 November 2017	Labrador Records	CD	LAB103R

== Credits ==
- All songs recorded and produced by Philip Ekström, except:
  - "Pleasure Songs" recorded and produced by Lars Malmros.
  - "Void" recorded and produced by Philip Ekström and Henrik Ekström.
- Recorded at the House Arrest Studio, Gothenburg.
- Strings on "Still" by Karin Hagström (violin) and Lina Molander (viola) from the quartet Qvartiett.
- Arranged by Philip Ekström.
- Mixed by Philip Ekström and Henrik Ekström.
- Mastered at Cutting Room by Thomas Eberger.
- Photos by Henrik Mårtensson; sleeve design by Peter Eriksson.
