= The Boy Who Couldn't Stop Dreaming =

Studio album by Club 8
- Released: 2 October 2007
- Genre: Indie pop
- Length: 34:54
- Label: Labrador
- Producer: Komstedt, Angergård

Club 8 chronology
| Strangely Beautiful (2003) | The Boy Who Couldn't Stop Dreaming (2007) | The People's Record (2010) |

Professional ratings
Review scores
| Source | Rating |
|---|---|
| AllMusic | 4/5 stars |
| Pitchfork Media | 7.6/10 |

The Boy Who Couldn't Stop Dreaming is the sixth studio album by Swedish band Club 8.

== Track listing ==
1. "Jesus, Walk With Me"
2. "Whatever You Want"
3. "Football Kids"
4. "Hopes And Dreams"
5. "Everything Goes"
6. "Heaven"
7. "When I Come Around"
8. "Leave The North"
9. "In The Morning"
10. "Sometimes"
11. "Where Birds Don't Fly"
12. "The Boy Who Couldn't Stop Dreaming"
