= Running Out of Love =

Studio album by The Radio Dept.
- Released: 21 October 2016
- Recorded: 2015–2016
- Genre: Dream pop; indie pop; electronic
- Length: 44:50
- Label: Labrador
- Producer: The Radio Dept.; Tomas Bodén; Erik Möller

The Radio Dept. chronology
Passive Aggressive: Singles 2002–2010 (2011)	Running Out of Love (2016)

Singles from Running Out of Love
- 1. "Occupied" Released: 16 June 2015; 2. "Swedish Guns" Released: 31 August 2016; 3. "We Got Game" Released: 7 October 2016; 4. "Teach Me to Forget" Released: 14 July 2017

Running Out of Love is the fourth studio album by Swedish indie pop band The Radio Dept., released on 21 October 2016. Their first LP since 2010's Clinging to a Scheme, Running Out of Love was delayed by a legal battle with their record label Labrador and inspired by "life in Sweden in 2016".

The first single "Occupied" was released on a three-track EP of the same name on 16 June 2015 on a limited run of 1,000 12" records. The second single "Swedish Guns" was released over a year later, on 31 August 2016, followed by the third single "We Got Game" on 7 October 2016 and fourth single "Teach Me to Forget" on 14 July 2017.

The album was shortlisted by IMPALA (The Independent Music Companies Association) for the Album of the Year Award 2016, which rewards on a yearly basis the best album released on an independent European label.

== Reception ==
Professional ratings
Aggregate scores
Source	Rating
AnyDecentMusic?	7.6/10
Metacritic	82/100
Review scores
Source	Rating
AllMusic	4/5 stars
Consequence of Sound	B
Drowned in Sound	9/10
Exclaim!	8/10
MusicOMH	4/5 stars
Pitchfork	7.6/10
PopMatters	8/10
The Skinny	4/5 stars
Uncut	8/10
Under the Radar	8/10

Running Out of Love received positive reviews from critics. On Metacritic, the album holds a score of 82 out of 100 based on 17 reviews, indicating "universal acclaim".

== Commercial performance ==
Running Out of Love debuted at number six on the Billboard Top Dance/Electronic Albums chart with sales of 1,000 copies, marking the band's first entry on the chart. The album also reached number 19 on the Heatseekers Albums chart.

== Track listing ==
No.	Title	Writer(s)	Length
1.	"Sloboda Narodu"	Johan Duncanson	3:13
2.	"Swedish Guns"	Duncanson	5:35
3.	"We Got Game"	Duncanson; Martin Carlberg	4:15
4.	"Thieves of State"	Duncanson; Carlberg	1:16
5.	"Occupied"	Duncanson; Carlberg	7:19
6.	"This Thing Was Bound to Happen"	Duncanson	3:12
7.	"Can't Be Guilty"	Duncanson	4:36
8.	"Committed to the Cause"	Duncanson; Carlberg	5:48
9.	"Running Out of Love"	Duncanson	3:30
10.	"Teach Me to Forget"	Duncanson; Carlberg	6:06
Total length:			44:50

== Personnel ==
Credits for Running Out of Love adapted from album liner notes.

The Radio Dept.

- Johan Duncanson
- Martin Carlberg

Additional musicians

- Daniel Tjäder – keyboards (track 7)

Production

- Tomas Bodén – mastering, mixing, production (track 10)
- Erik Möller – production (track 10)
- The Radio Dept. – mixing, production

== Charts ==
Chart (2016)	Peak position
Swedish Albums (Sverigetopplistan)	11
US Heatseekers Albums (Billboard)	19
US Top Dance Albums (Billboard)	6
