= Sing Along with Acid House Kings =

Album by Acid House Kings

Studio album by Acid House Kings
- Released: 20 April 2005
- Studio: Summersound Studios (Stockholm)
- Genre: Indie pop; twee pop
- Length: 41:34
- Label: Labrador
- Producer: Johan Angergård; Niklas Angergård

Acid House Kings chronology
Mondays Are Like Tuesdays and Tuesdays Are Like Wednesdays (2002)	Sing Along with Acid House Kings (2005)	Music Sounds Better with You (2011)

Singles from Sing Along with Acid House Kings
- 1. "Do What You Wanna Do" Released: 2 March 2005; 2. "This Heart Is a Stone" Released: 21 August 2012

Sing Along with Acid House Kings is the fourth studio album by Swedish indie pop band Acid House Kings. It was released on 20 April 2005 by Labrador Records.

== Critical reception ==
Professional ratings
Review scores
Source	Rating
AllMusic	4.5/5 stars
The Guardian	3/5 stars
Pitchfork	7.7/10

Tim Sendra of AllMusic hailed Sing Along with Acid House Kings as "one of the best releases, indie or not, of 2005."

== Track listing ==
All tracks are written by Johan Angergård and Niklas Angergård, except where noted

No.	Title	Writer(s)	Length
1.	"That's Because You Drive Me"		3:00
2.	"Do What You Wanna Do"		3:07
3.	"This Heart Is a Stone"		3:03
4.	"London School of Economics"		2:17
5.	"7 Days"		3:09
6.	"I Write Summer Songs for No Reason"		2:55
7.	"Tonight Is Forever"	J. Angergård; N. Angergård; Julia Lannerheim; Joakim Ödlund	3:08
8.	"The Saturday Train"		2:59
9.	"Sleeping"		2:28
10.	"Will You Love Me in the Morning?"		2:49
11.	"A Long Term Plan"		3:47
12.	"Wipe Away Those Tears"		2:52
Total length:			41:34

== Personnel ==
Credits for Sing Along with Acid House Kings adapted from album liner notes.

Acid House Kings

- Johan Angergård – bass, guitar, keyboards, backing vocals
- Niklas Angergård – vocals, guitar, keyboards
- Julia Lannerheim – vocals
- Joakim Ödlund – guitar

Additional musicians

- Anders-Petter Kjellgren – trumpet

Production

- Johan Angergård – production
- Niklas Angergård – production
- Thomas Eberger – mastering

Artwork and design

- Peter Eriksson – artwork
- Kjell B. Persson – photography
