= The People's Record =

Studio album by Club 8
- Released: May 18, 2010
- Genre: Indie pop
- Length: 37:01
- Label: Labrador Records
- Producers: Komstedt, Angergård

Club 8 chronology
The Boy Who Couldn't Stop Dreaming (2007)	The People's Record (2010)	Above The City (2013)

The People's Record is the seventh studio album by Swedish band Club 8.

== Reception ==
Professional ratings
Aggregate scores
Source	Rating
Metacritic	67/100
Review scores
Source	Rating
AllMusic	4/5 stars
Pitchfork	6.2/10
Under the Radar	8/10 stars

The People's Record received mixed to positive reviews from critics. On Metacritic, the album holds a score of 67/100 based on 6 reviews, indicating "generally favorable reviews".

== Track listing ==
1. "Western Hospitality" - 3:49
2. "Isn't That Great?" - 4:21
3. "Shape Up!" - 3:17
4. "Dancing with the Mentally Ill" - 3:56
5. "My Pessimistic Heart" - 3:05
6. "Back to A" - 3:30
7. "Like Me" - 3:10
8. "Be Mad, Get Ill, Be Still" - 3:11
9. "We're All Going to Die" - 3:36
10. "The People Speak" - 5:06
