= Muon (band) =

Singaporean post-rock band

- Also known as: Chrome Vanadium; Yes We Are Models
- Genres: Post rock, experimental, electronica, indie
- Years active: 1999–present
- Labels: Wallwork Records, LogicalNoise Records
- Members: Nick Chan; Jordan Chia; Adam Shah; Ren Wong
- Past members: Justin Chin; Khairyl Hashim; Junaidi Kusnong; Edwin Leong; Timothy Ngoh; Eswandy Sarip; Chew Wei Shan
- Website: www.muonmagick.com

Muon is a post-rock and electronica band from Singapore that originally began in 1999 as a solo project by founding member, Nick Chan. The band is influenced by genres such as IDM, ambient, trip hop and drum and bass, and artists such as DJ Shadow, Aphex Twin and The Cinematic Orchestra.

Nick released two albums on his own, 'The Death of Cinema' (2003) and 'In Flught' (2004) before recruiting drummer Edwin Leong in 2005. Muon's latest formation now comprises Nick together with Jordan Chia, Adam Shah and Ren Wong.

The band has performed extensively at gigs and festivals including venues Zouk and 3some in Bangkok, Baybeats Festival at The Esplanade, Enroute Festival, Dual City Sessions, PlusMinusTen, Syndicate Subsessions, Musicity Singapore and Fred Perry 60th Anniversary.

Muon recently released its critically acclaimed fourth studio album, 'The Shape of Shapes to Come' (2012) on its bandcamp.

== Current members ==
- Nick Chan (guitar, production, programming)

Former member of bands Astreal and I Am David Sparkle

- Jordan Chia (keyboards, production, programming)
- Adam Shah (percussion)

Former member of band The Observatory

- Ren Wong(Bass)

Muon's 'The Shape of Shapes to Come' LP, released 2012.

== Discography ==
- 2012 The Shape of Shapes to Come
- 2011 Live at Mosaic Festival
- 2008 The New Mutants
- 2004 In Flught
- 2003 The Death of Cinema
- 2002 Bangkok Live

== Awards and accolades ==
- 2011 'Best Laptop Act' by JUICE Magazine
- 2007 Motorola Style Creators Directory
- 2006 Winner, Resfest Singapore Nokia Handheld Cinema with SILNT
- 2003 Nominated, 'Best Local Dance Act’ at Mediacorp's Lush 99.5FM Singapore Jam Annual Awards
- 2003 Charted #1 on Mediacorp's 987FM Earwax:Hip Parade show
