= Suburban Kids with Biblical Names =

Swedish twee pop band

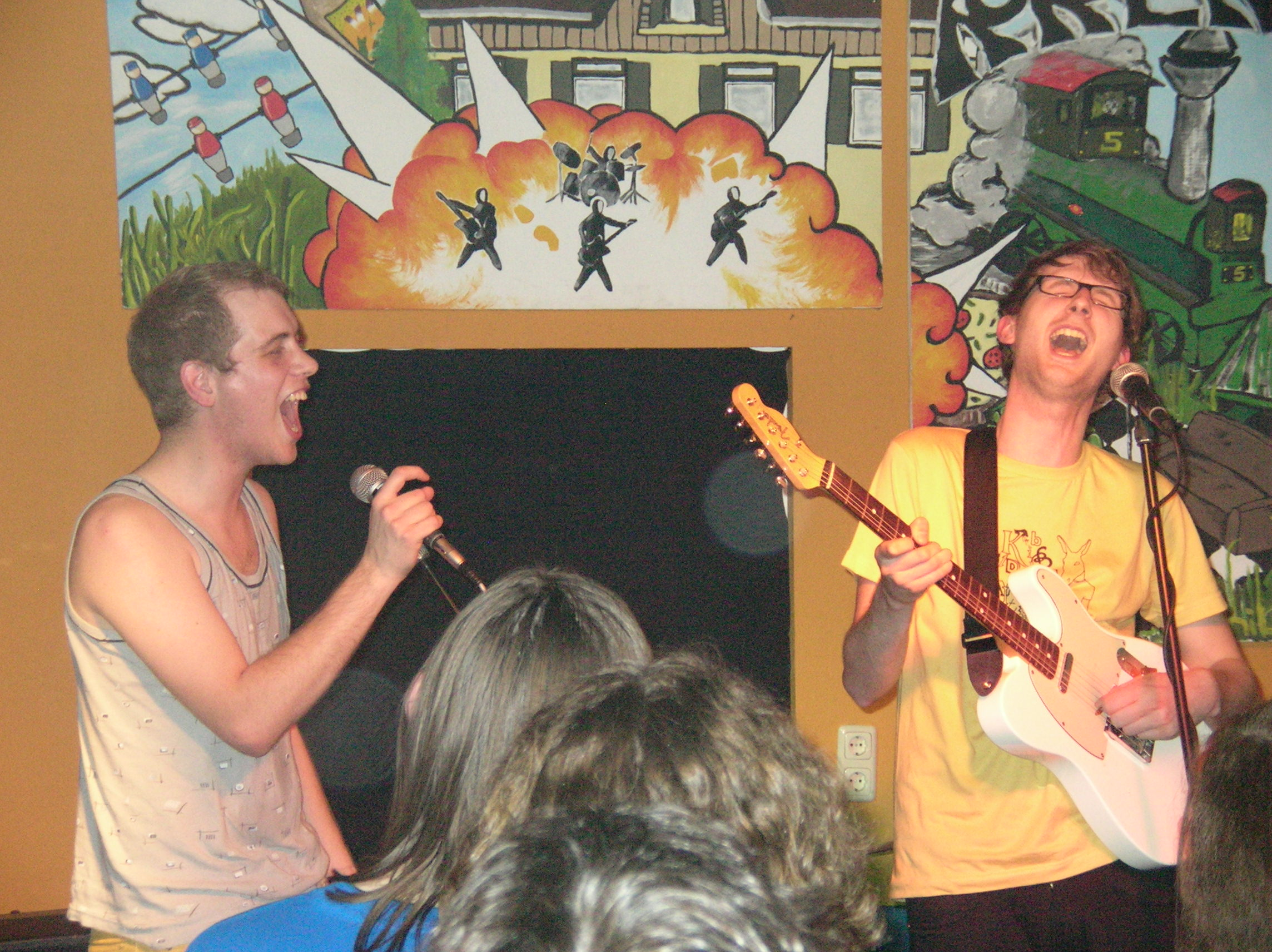

Background information
- Origin: Haninge, Sweden
- Genres: Twee pop, indie pop
- Years active: 2003–present
- Labels: Labrador; Minty Fresh; Yesboyicecream
- Members: Johan Hedberg; Peter Gunnarsson
- Website: www.labrador.se/skwbn/

Suburban Kids with Biblical Names is a Swedish twee pop band consisting of Johan Hedberg and Peter Gunnarsson. The band was formed in December 2003, in Haninge. Their name comes from a lyric in the song "People" by the Silver Jews.

== History ==
In the beginning of 2004, the band put two songs on the internet and received warm listener response. After this, Sonic magazine interviewed them and included one of their songs on a compilation CD. They were signed to Labrador Records and released their first EP, #1. In 2005, they released their second EP, #2. Their debut album #3 was released in October 2005 in Sweden and has subsequently been released by Minty Fresh in the US and by Yesboyicecream Records in the UK and Ireland. Their song "Rent a Wreck" from #3 is featured in the Prius "Yes" commercial.

On 4 February 2009, the band released their third EP, #4.

== Discography ==
=== Albums ===
- #3 (2005)

=== EPs ===
- #1 (2004)
- #2 (2005)
- #4 (2009)

=== Singles ===
- "Loop Duplicate My Heart" (2007)
