= Sambassadeur =

Swedish pop band

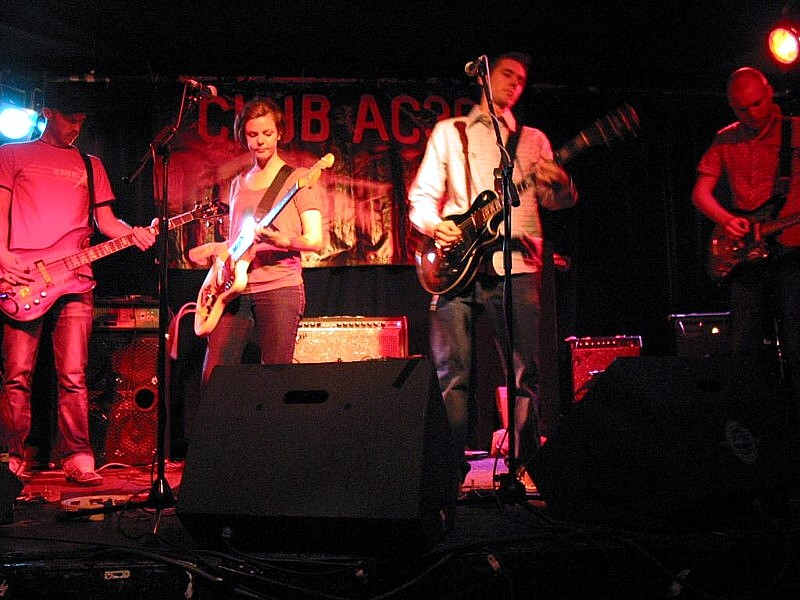

Background information
- Origin: Gothenburg, Sweden
- Genres: Indie pop, dream pop
- Years active: 2003–present
- Labels: Labrador Records
- Members: Anna Persson; Daniel Permbo; Joachim Läckberg; Daniel Tolergård
- Website: Sambassadeur.com; Sambassadeur on Labrador

Sambassadeur are a Swedish pop band formed in 2003 in Gothenburg. They are named after the Serge Gainsbourg song "Les Sambassadeurs." The band are signed to the Labrador label, and to date, they have released four studio albums and a handful of EPs and singles. Their third album, European, was released in February 2010.

== Discography ==
=== Studio albums ===
Sambassadeur (LAB071, 1 June 2005)
No.	Title	Length
1.	"New Moon"	2:42
2.	"Ice & Snow"	2:58
3.	"One Last Remark"	3:17
4.	"Sense of Sound"	3:51
5.	"If Rain"	2:35
6.	"Still Life Ahead"	2:58
7.	"La Chanson de Prévert"	3:24
8.	"Between the Lines"	2:40
9.	"In the Calm"	2:03
10.	"Just Because of You"	2:45
11.	"Whatever Season"	3:14
12.	"Posture of a Boy"	2:40

Migration (LAB106, 24 October 2007)
No.	Title	Length
1.	"The Park"	3:27
2.	"Subtle Changes"	4:43
3.	"That Town"	2:54
4.	"Falling in Love"	3:30
5.	"Migration"	4:20
6.	"Final Say"	5:41
7.	"Someday We're Through"	3:46
8.	"Something to Keep"	2:55
9.	"Calvi"	3:10

European (LAB126, 24 February 2010)
No.	Title	Length
1.	"Stranded"	4:40
2.	"Days"	2:54
3.	"I Can Try"	4:17
4.	"Forward Is All"	4:27
5.	"Albatross"	3:52
6.	"High and Low"	2:53
7.	"A Remote View"	2:04
8.	"Sandy Dunes"	5:29
9.	"Small Parade - (written by Tobin Sprout)"	2:52

Survival (digital release, 12 April 2019)
No.	Title	Length
1.	"Foot of Afrika"	3:30
2.	"Stuck"	3:28
3.	"Orustfjord"	4:32
4.	"41"	3:16
5.	"Kors"	3:33
6.	"The Fall"	3:23
7.	"Roads"	4:47
8.	"Ex On The Beach"	3:31

=== Singles & EPs ===
- "Ice & Snow"/"There You Go" single (2004)
- Between the Lines (LAB069, 20 April 2005)
- New Moon (LAB070, 4 May 2005)
- Coastal Affairs (LAB087, 3 May 2006)
- "Final Say"/"Crooked Spine" single (LAB112, 23 January 2008)
- "Days" single (digital, 1 February 2010)
- "I Can Try" single (digital, 14 July 2010)
- "Memories"/"Hours Away" single (LAB144V, 23 November 2012)
- "Foot of Afrikka" single (digital, 1 February 2019)
- "Stuck"/"Stuck Azure Blue Remix" (digital, 8 March 2019)
