= I Am David Sparkle =

Singaporean music band

- Origin: Singapore
- Genres: Post-rock; Experimental rock Progressive rock Indie
- Years active: 2001 – present
- Label: KittyWu Records
- Website: amp.channelv.com/iamdavidsparkle

I Am David Sparkle is a band from Singapore, formed in 2001 as an instrumental collective.

The band's name is a direct literal translation from the name of a famous Malaysian singing legend – M. Daud Kilau.

The band's debut EP, Apocalypse of Your Heart, was released "to considerable buzz" in November 2006. They released their debut album This is the new in 2007, the single "Nosferatu Makes Me Nervous" in 2009, and the album swords in 2010.

The band were invited to perform at South by Southwest in 2009.

== Members ==
Currently made up of members who have all served time in various acclaimed indie, punk and hardcore acts over the last 12 years in Singapore.

Current

- Amran Khamis - Guitars / Effects / Keys
- Johnny Mo - Guitars / Beats / Keys
- Farizwan Fajari - Bass
- Zahir Sanosi - Drums / Percussion
- Adel Rashid - Guitars

Past

- Prof. Edryan Hakim - Electric Wizard-ry (2001–2003)
- Redzuan Hussein - Keys/Noise Effects (2002–2004)
- Nick Chan - Guitars / Beats / Production (2007)
- Yamani Ismail - Bass (2001–2007)

== Discography ==
=== This Is The New ===
- Released: November 2007
- Recorded and produced Mr MUON (2006–2007)
- Written, arranged & performed by: I Am David Sparkle

=== Apocalypse of Your Heart EP ===
- Released: November 2006
- Recorded by: Leonard Soosay (2005)
- Written, arranged & performed by: I Am David Sparkle

== Awards ==
- Best Alternative Act (Motorola SUPER-StyleMIX 2007)

== Performances ==
I Am David Sparkle has played at various shows/festivals such as:

- Global Gathering Malaysia, 27 Oct 2007
- Good Vibrations Festival, 19 Feb 2007
- KL Jam Asia, 11 Feb 2007
- Off Beat @ Home Club, 26 Jan 2007
- Bar None's 'Monday Sessions', 27 Nov 2006
- BayBeats 2005
- Others include ‘Tesseract’, ‘RNDM’ and ‘Death of the Vocalist’.

== Reviews ==
"The group creates slow-burning soundscapes reminiscent of Explosions in the Sky, Godspeed You Black Emperor and Mogwai's, but less dramatic... Layers upon layers of guitars create a textual mood that ranks with some of the best post-rock sounds out there." - IS Magazine, 26 Jan 2007 [Singapore]

"...haunting and utterly unforgettable." - TODAY, 17 Feb 2007 [Singapore]
