= Music Sounds Better with You (album) =

Studio album by Acid House Kings
- Released: 22 March 2011
- Studio: Summersound Studios (Stockholm)
- Genre: Indie pop; twee pop
- Length: 30:42
- Label: Labrador
- Producer: Johan Angergård; Niklas Angergård

Acid House Kings chronology
Sing Along with Acid House Kings (2005)	Music Sounds Better with You (2011)

Singles from Music Sounds Better with You
- 1. "Are We Lovers or Are We Friends?" Released: 7 December 2010; 2. "Would You Say Stop?" Released: 1 March 2011; 3. "Under Water" Released: 28 June 2011; 4. "(I'm In) A Chorus Line" Released: 20 December 2011; 5. "I Just Called to Say Jag Älskar Dig" Released: 5 June 2012

Professional ratings
Aggregate scores
Source	Rating
AnyDecentMusic?	7.0/10
Metacritic	81/100
Review scores
Source	Rating
AllMusic	4.5/5 stars
Consequence of Sound	3/5 stars
MusicOMH	4/5 stars
Pitchfork	7.8/10
PopMatters	7/10
The Skinny	2/5 stars
Under the Radar	8/10

Music Sounds Better with You is the fifth studio album by Swedish indie pop band Acid House Kings. It was released on 22 March 2011 by Labrador Records.

Five singles were released from Music Sounds Better with You: "Are We Lovers or Are We Friends?", "Would You Say Stop?", "Under Water", "(I'm In) A Chorus Line" and a remix of "I Just Called to Say Jag Älskar Dig". Additionally, the track "Heaven Knows I Miss Him Now" was re-recorded by the band with Dan Treacy of Television Personalities and released as a single.

== Track listing ==
All tracks are written by Johan Angergård and Niklas Angergård.

No.	Title	Length
1.	"Are We Lovers or Are We Friends?"	3:38
2.	"Windshield"	2:27
3.	"Would You Say Stop?"	3:06
4.	"Under Water"	3:23
5.	"(I'm In) A Chorus Line"	2:40
6.	"Where Have We Been?"	2:41
7.	"Waterfall"	3:06
8.	"There Is Something Beautiful"	3:47
9.	"I Just Called to Say Jag Älskar Dig"	2:55
10.	"Heaven Knows I Miss Him Now"	2:59
Total length:		30:42

== Personnel ==
Credits for Music Sounds Better with You adapted from album liner notes.

Acid House Kings

- Johan Angergård – bass, guitar, keyboards, backing vocals
- Niklas Angergård – vocals, bass, guitar, keyboards, percussion, piano
- Julia Lannerheim – vocals

Additional musicians

- Andil Dahl – piano
- Pernilla Larsson – flute
- Erik Palmberg – trumpet

Production

- Johan Angergård – production
- Niklas Angergård – production
- Björn Engelman – mastering

Artwork and design

- Peter Eriksson – artwork
- Henrik Halvarsson – photography
