= Pleasure (Club 8 album) =

Studio album by Club 8
- Released: 20 November 2015
- Genre: Indie pop
- Length: 23:39
- Label: Labrador Records
- Producer: Johan Angergård

Club 8 chronology
Above the City (2013)	Pleasure (2015)	Golden Island (2018)

Pleasure is the ninth studio album by Swedish band Club 8. It was released via Labrador Records.

== Background ==
It was described as a record about love, sex and jealousy, and an expertly crafted, cool and clever "grown-up" pop record.

== Reception ==
Professional ratings
Aggregate scores
Source	Rating
Metacritic	74/100
Review scores
Source	Rating
AllMusic	4/5 stars
Blurt	4/5 stars
PopMatters	6/10 stars
Under the Radar	7.5/10 stars

Pleasure received positive reviews from critics. On Metacritic, the album holds a score of 74/100 based on 4 reviews, indicating "generally favorable reviews".

== Track listing ==
No.	Title	Length
1.	"Love Dies"	2:43
2.	"Skin"	2:48
3.	"Late Nights"	2:56
4.	"Kinky Love"	2:55
5.	"Jealousy Remains"	2:47
6.	"Hush"	2:39
7.	"Movement"	2:46
8.	"Promises We Never Meant to Keep"	4:05
Total length:		23:39
