= Strangely Beautiful =

Studio album by Club 8
- Released: April 2003
- Genre: Indie pop
- Label: Hidden Agenda Records
- Producer: Komstedt, Angergård

Club 8 chronology
Spring Came, Rain Fell (2002)	Strangely Beautiful (2003)	The Boy Who Couldn't Stop Dreaming (2007)

Strangely Beautiful is the fifth studio album by Swedish band Club 8.

== Track listing ==
1. "When Lights Go Out"
2. "What Shall We Do Next?"
3. "I Wasn't Much of a Fight"
4. "Stay by My Side"
5. "Cold Hearts"
6. "Between Waking and Sleeping [Instrumental]"
7. "This Is the Morning"
8. "Next Step You'll Take"
9. "Beauty of the Way We're Living"
10. "Saturday Night Engine"
11. "We Move in Silence"

== Reception ==
The album has been described as "arty experimentation....breezy, Cardigans-styled dream-pop with a decidedly retro-continental flair".
