= Part Company =

Single by The Go-Betweens

from the album Spring Hill Fair
- B-side: "Just a King in Mirrors"
- Released: August 1984
- Recorded: November 1983
- Studio: Pathway Studios, London
- Genre: Jangle pop; indie pop
- Length: 4:53
- Label: Sire
- Songwriters: Grant McLennan, Robert Forster
- Producer: John Brand

The Go-Betweens singles chronology
"Man O'Sand to Girl O'Sea" (1983)	"Part Company" (1984)	"Bachelor Kisses" (1984)

"Part Company" is a song by the Australian alternative rock band The Go-Betweens that was released as the first single from their third album Spring Hill Fair. The single was issued in August 1984 by Sire Records with "Just a King in Mirrors" as the B-side. In the UK a 12" single was also released on Sire. The single failed to make an impact on the charts.

In November 1983 the band recorded a number of demos commissioned by Rough Trade for their third album, at Pathway Studios, with producer John Brand. "Newton Told Me" was re-recorded after originally being considered as a B-side for "Man O'Sand to Girl O'Sea" and recorded by the band in May 1983. "Part Company" was also re-recorded in May 1984 for its subsequent inclusion in Spring Hill Fair.

== Details ==
Forster later indicated in an interview that McLennan had told him that "Just a King in Mirrors" was about Nick Cave, whom he was close to at the time. Desperately broke at the time, Forster said, "A moment of brightness for me was writing the music for "Part Company", the strummed folkie chords setting up the possibility of telling a story, not a fragment."

In 2016, Forster wrote that "Part Company" was one of a number of songs he still played, and "were the beginning of a more mature writing style where I fused the strumming of my late seventies tunes to the curves and kinks of the past few years. Add experience and time and I had grown-up songs with better lyrics."

The Guardian noted, "On first listen, it sounds like the perfect love song to soundtrack broken hearts and lovers going their separate ways. According to Forster, however, all is not what it seems. He wrote the song when the group were on the cusp of moving to England, and it is an ode to Australia."

== Critical reception ==
In his review of Spring Hill Fair at Allmusic, Ned Raggett describes the song as having "an almost-Smiths-like all-around performance on the verses spiked with an at once inspirational and regret-laden chorus." In a more detailed review of the song, Raggett states that it "demonstrates so many of the Go-Betweens' core strengths it's practically a role model for anyone seeking inspiration -- a literate but not obnoxiously so lyric, a fine lead performance from Forster, an arrangement that throws in some subtle tweaks (and a suddenly all the more intense chorus) to the straightforward electric/acoustic combination. The keyboards throwing sound like a nervous, uncomfortable wail, Lindy Morrison's drums are among her strongest, and the whole song seems to capture an uneasy combination of diffidence and sudden yearning down to its fadeout."

Pitchfork's Doulas Wolk comments that "Part Company" is "Bob Dylan's 'Blood on the Tracks' refracted through Australian rehearsal room windows. The Courier-Mail's Noel Mengel said, "Some days I would make this No 1. One of Robert Forster's greatest songs."

Steve Bell advises that "the song features strong lyrics and some serious six-string interplay (the combination of Forster and McLennan’s guitars that would later become so important basically started here) but never really managed to gather much traction."

== Track listing ==
All tracks are written by G. McLennan, R. Forster

7" vinyl release
No.	Title	Length
1.	"Part Company"	4:53
2.	"Just a King in Mirrors"	2:58
Total length:		7:51

All tracks are written by G. McLennan, R. Forster, except where noted.

12" vinyl release
No.	Title	Length
1.	"Part Company"	4:53
2.	"Just a King in Mirrors"	2:58
3.	"Newton Told Me"	2:33
Total length:		10:24

== Release history ==
Region	Date	Label	Format	Catalogue
United Kingdom	August 1984	Sire	7" vinyl	W 9211
United Kingdom	August 1984	Sire	12" vinyl	W 9211-T

== Credits ==
=== The Go-Betweens ===
- Grant McLennan — guitar
- Lindy Morrison — drums
- Robert Forster — vocals, guitar
- Robert Vickers — bass

=== Production ===
- Producer, Engineer – John Brand
- Photographer — Bleddyn Butcher
