= Dual City Sessions =

Traveling exhibition in Asia

Dual City Sessions was conceived in 2007 as a traveling exhibition featuring designers from two cities, and has been showcased at DesignTide Tokyo, Singapore Design Festival, DMY Berlin Festival, Shanghai Design Biennial and Alt Space Tokyo.

The exhibition presents itself as a platform for international collaboration and cross-pollination of diverse creative disciplines - to showcase efforts between two cities, bringing together emerging and innovative practitioners in the fields of art, fashion, music and design.

Conceived by art director Felix Ng of design studio SILNT, the exhibition has collaborated with Japanese design studio artless and architect Shuzo Okabe.

== 2007 - Null ==
Each country’s team of artists work based on the themes of nature, architecture and other items symbolic of their country. Using only two elements in monochrome, the artworks are conceived, designed and constructed personally by each artist.

The participating Japanese and Singaporean artists – 28 in total – will each render their theories on two eight-metre (26 ft)-long original prints. When connected, the individual pieces become one artwork, inspired by and representative not only of Japanese beauty and culture but also of the connection between human and nature

=== Participating artists (Singapore) ===
- Choy Ka Fai (of TheatreWorks / KYTV)
- Christopher Lee (The Asylum design studio)
- Daniel Koh (Unit)
- Felix Ng (SILNT)
- Grace Tan (kwodrent)
- Hanson Ho (H55)
- Hjgher
- Junkflea
- &Larry
- Mei (The Analog Girl)
- ND Chow (Angle)
- Shu (SILNT)
- Steve Lawler (Mojoko)
- Tom Merckx (Me and Mister Jones)

=== Participating artists (Japan) ===
- Akira Osawa
- Hideki Owa
- Hikaru Koike
- Hiroshi Sato (Semitransparent Design)
- Kei Kawakami (asobigraphic)
- Keigo Anan (tngrm)
- Koji Nishida (raku-gaki.com)
- Momoko Kawakami
- Shun Kawakami (artless)
- Tadashi Ura (gleamix)
- Taisuke Koyama
- Takashi Kamada (.spfdesign)
- Yu-ki Sakurai (mokuva)
- +39 / K.Tozaki (Karatesystem)

== 2008 - Art with Sound ==
Art with Sound is a cross-disciplinary collaboration between designers and musicians from Japan and Singapore. The exhibition brings together the complexities of the two disciplines, both innate and compelling to each other. The exhibition was showcased at DMY International Design Festival (Berlin, Germany), Shanghai Design Biennial and Alt Space in Tokyo.

=== Participating artists (Japan) ===
- Artless + Noiselessly
- Adapter + The Samos
- Merry + Leo Sato
- Raku-Gaki + Soothe
- Tycoon graphics + Merce Death

=== Participating artists (Singapore) ===
- 4femmes + Fugusan
- Djohan + Fezz
- SILNT + Muon
- Steve Lawler + AntiGravityChocolate
- Victor Low + Phunk Studio
