= Det Vackra Livet =

- Origin: Jönköping and Gothenburg, Sweden
- Genres: Indie rock, dream pop, shoegazing
- Years active: 2010–-present
- Labels: Labrador Records
- Spinoff of: The Mary Onettes
- Members: Henrik Ekström; Philip Ekström
- Website: Det Vackra Livet

Det Vackra Livet are a Swedish indie dream pop band, signed to Labrador Records. The group's first single "Viljan" was released in early 2011, and a self-titled debut album followed in May of that same year.

== History ==
Det Vackra Livet was formed in Gothenburg by brothers Henrik and Philip Ekström. The brothers are also founding members of Swedish dreampop group The Mary Onettes, with whom Det Vackra Livet shares much of its sound and influences. By contrast, The Mary Onettes' lyrics are performed in English, whereas Det Vackra Livet's lyrics are sung in Swedish.

Inspired by his grandmother's memories and Finland Swedish poet Claes Andersson, Philip Ekström wrote fifteen songs which would become material for the band during a creative outburst in late 2010. The group's first single "Viljan" was released digitally on Labrador Records in January 2011. The group released a ten-track self-titled debut album in May 2011. Det Vackra Livet translates to The Beautiful Life in English.

== Discography ==
=== Albums ===
- Det Vackra Livet (3 May 2011)
  - Labrador Records LAB138

=== Singles and EPs ===
- Viljan (Jan 2011)
  - Labrador Records DLAB029
