= Acid House Kings =

Swedish indie pop band

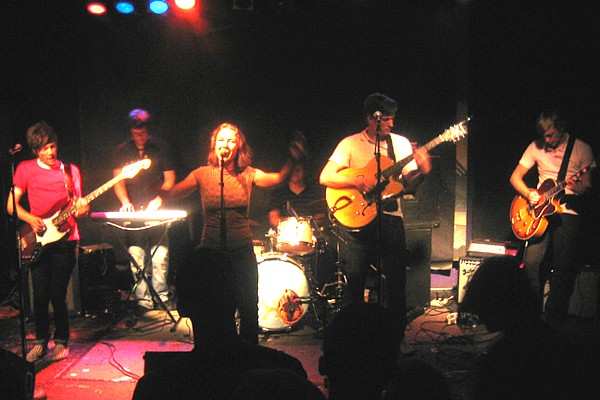

Background information
- Origin: Stockholm, Sweden
- Genres: Twee pop Indie pop
- Years active: 1991–present
- Labels: Twentyseven; Labrador; Shelflife
- Members: Niklas Angergård; Johan Angergård; Julia Lannerheim
- Past members: Joakim Ödlund
- Website: acidhousekings.com

Acid House Kings are a Swedish indie pop band. They were founded in 1991 by Joakim Ödlund (also in the bands Poprace, Double Dan, and Starlet) and brothers Niklas (Red Sleeping Beauty) and Johan Angergård (Club 8, The Legends, Poprace).

== History ==
With the release of their first album, Pop, Look & Listen, they supposedly decided on a 10-year plan to release an album every five years to have a trilogy of albums released by the year 2002, a plan that eventually worked out exactly as scheduled.

According to plan, they released Advantage Acid House Kings in 1997 and the album proved to be a huge step forward to form their trademark sound of jangly, catchy guitar oriented indie-pop. The album featured Julia Lannerheim as guest vocalist on a couple of songs, who eventually joined the band officially as a full-time member in 2001. The band recorded a cover version of Orchestral Manoeuvres in the Dark's "Almost" for the tribute album Pretending to See the Future: A Tribute to OMD (2001), with their interpretation drawing praise from AllMusic.

In 2002 they released their third album Mondays Are Like Tuesdays And Tuesdays Are Like Wednesdays.

Their 4th album Sing Along With Acid House Kings was initially released as a limited edition featuring a bonus DVD consisting of instrumental karaoke versions of the complete album, accompanied by home made videos showing the band members doing various everyday tasks.

The album saw the band further perfecting their sound established on the previous records.

In the summer of 2007 they entered the studio again to record their 5th album. Initially it was due to be released in 2008 but was then pushed back for a release in 2011, and entitled Music Sounds Better with You.

== Discography ==
=== Studio albums ===
- Pop, Look & Listen! (1992)
- Advantage Acid House Kings (1997)
- Mondays Are Like Tuesdays and Tuesdays Are Like Wednesdays (2002)
- Sing Along with Acid House Kings (2005)
- Music Sounds Better with You (2011)

=== EPs ===
- Play Pop EP (1992)

=== Compilations ===
- The Sound of Summer (2000)

=== Singles ===
- She Fakes Apples (1991)
- Monaco GP (1994)
- Yes! You Love Me (1997)
- We Are the Acid House Kings (2001)
- Say Yes If You Love Me (2002)
- Do What You Wanna Do (2005)
- Everyone Sings Along With Acid House Kings (2006)
- Are We Lovers or Are We Friends? (2010)
- A Little Dancing (2021)
- Honey, Honey (2022)
