= Lesser Matters =

Studio album by The Radio Dept.
- Released: 4 March 2003
- Genres: Dream pop; indie pop; shoegaze
- Length: 43:10
- Labels: Labrador; Shelflife
- Producers: Johan Duncanson; Martin Carlberg

The Radio Dept. chronology
Lesser Matters (2003)	Pet Grief (2006)

Singles from Lesser Matters
- 1. "Where Damage Isn't Already Done" Released: 2003; 2. "Why Won't You Talk About It?" Released: 31 May 2004; 3. "Ewan" Released: 13 December 2004

Lesser Matters is the debut studio album by Swedish indie pop band The Radio Dept. It was released on 4 March 2003 by Labrador Records.

The song "Keen on Boys" was featured in Sofia Coppola's Marie Antoinette, also appearing on the soundtrack to the film. "Strange Things Will Happen" was also featured in The Fault in Our Stars.

The album is also the only studio album by the band to feature founding member and vocalist Elin Almered, bassist Lisa Carlberg, and drummer Per Blomgren. Its cover art is a painting by Almered.

== Music ==
Lesser Matters is a dream pop and shoegaze record that draws additional influence from noise pop and classic indie pop. Almered departed the band prior to the recording of the album, but nonetheless contributed lead vocals on track "Strange Things Will Happen".

In a review, K. Ross Hoffman of AllMusic described the album's sound: "the guitars, most prominently, sometimes rangy languorous jangles but more often bleary, gloriously distorted smears that make anything else around them seem cleanly recorded by comparison, from cheap and crunchy drum machines to Johan Duncanson's wispy, barely-there vocals, which are merely draped in reverb when the rest of a track is draped in fuzz." He also further compared the album's music to the works of My Bloody Valentine, the Jesus and Mary Chain, Orange Juice, Felt, the Cure and New Order.

Louder Than War acknowledged the album's broad sonic palette, pointing out its nods to the likes of Pale Saints, Grandaddy, Mercury Rev, The Flaming Lips, Sonic Youth, The Velvet Underground, The Wake, The Field Mice, Young Marble Giants, Saint Etienne, and even old school hip-hop.

== Critical reception ==
Professional ratings
Aggregate scores
Source	Rating
Metacritic	84/100
Review scores
Source	Rating
AllMusic	4/5 stars
Drowned in Sound	9/10
Mojo	3/5 stars
NME	9/10
Now	4/5
Q	3/5 stars
Uncut	4/5 stars

Lesser Matters received rave reviews from critics. The album holds a rating of 84 out of 100 on the review aggregation website Metacritic, indicating "universal acclaim". It was ranked the ninth best album of 2004 by NME. K. Ross Hoffman of AllMusic gave the album four stars out of five, praising the songwriting

In a retrospective written for Louder Than War, Martin Gray praised the album for its execution of myriad of styles: "By any other band’s standards, such a disparate stew probably wouldn’t sound that great and could end up being an incoherent foggy mush, but in the hands of The Radio Dept. it’s their deftness with subtle touches, and their knack of concocting truly drop dead heavenly and dreamy melodies and textures that make me swoon with sheer blissful contentment...when it comes to one record that is a definitive, consummate, beginner’s guide to the perfect dream pop odyssey, it’s this one. I will treasure it forever."

Jason MacNeil of PopMatters gave an overall positive review to album, acknowledging its diverse sonic palette and "choppy and dirty" tone. However, he criticized certain songs such as "Why Won't You Talk About It", "It's Been Eight Years", and "Bus", opining that they felt musically underdeveloped.

== Track listing ==
All tracks are written by Johan Duncanson, except where noted.

No.	Title	Writer(s)	Length
1.	"Too Soon"	Duncanson; Martin Carlberg	1:17
2.	"Where Damage Isn't Already Done"		2:43
3.	"Keen on Boys"	Duncanson; Carlberg	4:53
4.	"Why Won't You Talk About It?"		3:08
5.	"It's Been Eight Years"		2:33
6.	"Bus"		2:58
7.	"Slottet #2" (The Castle #2)		3:07
8.	"1995"		3:11
9.	"Against the Tide"		4:23
10.	"Strange Things Will Happen"		4:24
11.	"Your Father"		4:01
12.	"Ewan"		2:23
13.	"Lost and Found"	Duncanson; Carlberg	4:09
Total length:			43:10

== Personnel ==
Credits for Lesser Matters adapted from album liner notes.

The Radio Dept.

- Johan Duncansson – vocals, guitar, keyboards
- Martin Carlberg (né Larsson) – guitar, keyboards, backing vocals
- Lisa Carlberg – bass, piano
- Per Blomgren – drums

Additional musicians

- Elin Almered – lead vocals (track 10)
- Johannes Burström – Roland Juno-60 synthesiser (tracks 3 and 8)

Production

- Johan Duncansson – mixing, recording
- Martin Larsson – mixing, recording
- Thomas Eberger – mastering

Artwork and design

- Elin Almered – cover artwork, painting
- Mattias Berglund – sleeve design
- Mårten Carlberg – photography

== Charts ==
Chart (2003–04)	Peak position
Swedish Albums (Sverigetopplistan)	31
UK Independent Albums (Official Charts)	29
