= Pelle Carlberg =

Swedish singer-songwriter

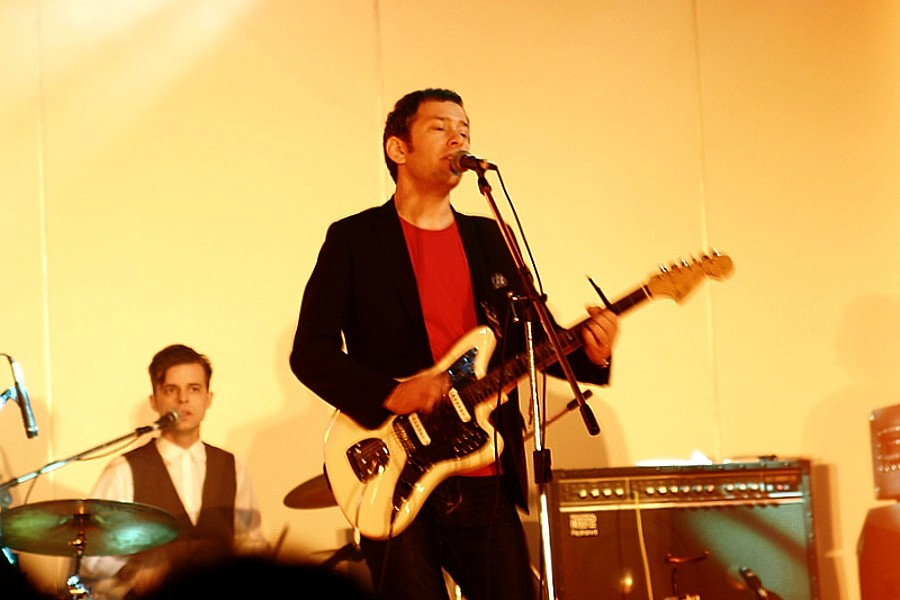

Background information
- Born: 21 October 1969 (age 55)
- Origin: Stockholm, Sweden
- Genres: Indie pop, Acoustic
- Occupation: Singer
- Years active: 2005–present
- Labels: Twentyseven, Labrador
- Website: pellecarlberg.se

Pelle Carlberg (born 21 October 1969) is a Swedish singer-songwriter. He is a member of the band Edson and also records and performs alone as a solo artist. His music video for Riverbank appeared on an in-game television in the video game The Darkness.

== Discography ==
=== Albums ===
- Everything. Now! (Twentyseven Records, 2 November 2005)
- In a Nutshell (Twentyseven Records, 28 March 2007)
- The Lilac Time (Twentyseven Records, 27 August 2008)

=== EPs ===
- "Go to Hell, Miss Rydell" (Twentyseven Records, 16 March 2005)
- "Riverbank" (Twentyseven Records, 19 October 2005)

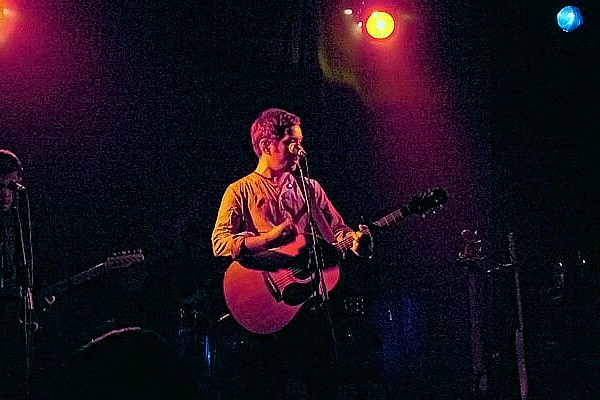
Pelle Carlberg in China 2008

=== Video game appearances ===
- Pelle Carlberg's "Riverbank" music video can also be seen in the video game The Darkness.

=== Compilation appearances ===
- "Go to Hell, Miss Rydell" (Labrador 100 – A Complete History of Popular Music, 2007)
