= Pet Grief =

Studio album by the Radio Dept.
- Released: 12 April 2006
- Genres: Dream pop; indie pop
- Length: 37:13
- Label: Labrador
- Producers: Johan Duncansson; Martin Carlberg

The Radio Dept. chronology
Lesser Matters (2003)	Pet Grief (2006)	Clinging to a Scheme (2010)

Singles from Pet Grief
- 1. "The Worst Taste in Music" Released: 15 March 2006

Pet Grief is the second studio album by Swedish dream pop band the Radio Dept., released on 12 April 2006 through Labrador Records. Following the success of debut Lesser Matters, their sophomore effort aimed to depart from their lo-fi and shoegaze-inflected sound to incorporate more elements of electronic music.

== Background ==
Prior to recording Pet Grief, The Radio Dept. had been reduced to a trio of Johan Duncanson, Martin Carlberg, and Daniel Tjäder. Drummer Per Blomgren had departed the band in 2004, followed by bassist Lisa Carlberg in 2005. As such, the band strove to create material that would no longer require a dedicated bassist, and opted to utilize drum machines for percussion going forward.

Duncanson moved from Malmö to Stockholm in 2005, prompting members to commute to each other's cities in order to record together. Duncanson and Carlberg were employed as social workers in separate psychiatric care facilities in Stockholm and Malmö, respectively. With their limited time, members would meet to play music on weekends.

== Musical style ==
The band had strived to rise above the limitations of their instruments, and "sound a bit more expensive than our equipment would allow." They largely recorded the album in one another's apartments, using pirated recording software on inexpensive computers, and by processing all instruments through a small guitar amplifier.

Pet Grief is noted for its departure from the sound of band's earlier catalog, marking a transition toward more electronic sensibilities. Duncanson commented that earlier in the recording process, "We steered away from anything that would make anyone think rock. We'd become a bit sceptical about guitars altogether. For a while we said it would be a completely electronic record and no one could accuse us of being rockers.” In the end, guitars would still be employed on the record; but with a subtler, and more textural role. During the recording of the album, the band drew inspiration from the likes of Pet Shop Boys, Prefab Sprout, and The Blue Nile. Allmusic's K. Ross Hoffman praised it for "an impeccably fashionable roll call of influences from British post-punk and shoegaze to more recent electronic indie and dream pop."

Duncanson explained that the title of the album refers to a "favourite grief more than about a pet. Something you can't let go of, even though you know you'd be a happier person if you did." Pet Grief's themes included unrequited love and betrayal (such as on "I Wanted You to Feel the Same" and "The Worst Taste in Music"), to suicide bereavement (on "Sleeping In").

== Critical reception ==
Professional ratings
Review scores
Source	Rating
AllMusic	3.5/5 stars
The Guardian	2/5 stars
Pitchfork	7.4/10

Compared to the band's debut album, Pet Grief initially received more polarized critical reception. Pitchfork's John Motley wrote, "The songs on Pet Grief are easy to fall in love with; the facile melodies and slick production eliminate any barriers to enjoyment. But the lack of challenge—few surprises, scant diversity—means you won't want to put the album on for repeat listens, even if you're never compelled to turn it off while it's playing. Radio Dept. could sacrifice a little polish for a few more rough edges."

AllMusic critic K. Ross Hoffman thought only a handful of the tracks are comparable to "the remarkably consistent quality" of the band's debut, Lesser Matters (2004), further elaborating: "It may be that they were just more interested in album-length ambience than stand-alone pop this time around—a couple of brief, spacy instrumentals seem to suggest as much. In that sense the album must certainly be regarded as a success; it's a rich and evocative mood piece, and still eminently worth hearing. It's just a minor disappointment when a band so adept at bridging the style-substance divide decide to limit themselves to just one facet of their talents."

Maddy Costa of The Guardian was more positive, stating that "in the right mood, there is something shy and lovely about Pet Grief, ghosts of the C86 sound that make you want to grab a cardigan and sway." In recent years, the album has gained much re-appraisal from fans, in particular with "Sleeping In" becoming the band's most-streamed song, owing to its popularity on social media platform TikTok.

== Track listing ==
All lyrics are written by Johan Duncanson; all music is composed by Johan Duncanson, except where noted.

No.	Title	Music	Length
1.	"It's Personal"		3:38
2.	"Pet Grief"	Johan Duncanson; Martin Carlberg	3:10
3.	"A Window"	Duncanson; Carlberg	3:27
4.	"I Wanted You to Feel the Same"		2:31
5.	"South Side"		1:16
6.	"The Worst Taste in Music"		3:21
7.	"Every Time"		3:44
8.	"What Will Give?"	Duncanson; Carlberg; Daniel Tjäder	4:30
9.	"Gibraltar"	Tjäder	1:35
10.	"Sleeping In"		3:31
11.	"Tell"	Duncanson; Max Weiland	3:09
12.	"Always a Relief"		3:21
Total length:			37:13

== Personnel ==
Credits adapted from the liner notes of Pet Grief.

The Radio Dept.

- Johan Duncanson – vocals, guitar, keyboards, production, mixing
- Martin Carlberg (né Larsson) – guitar, bass guitar, keyboards, production, mixing
- Daniel Tjäder – keyboards

Additional personnel

- Per Blomgren – drums (track 3)
- Alan Duncanson – cover photo
- Göran Olsson – inside photo

== Charts ==
Chart (2006)	Peak position
Swedish Albums (Sverigetopplistan)	12
