= Clinging to a Scheme =

Studio album by The Radio Dept.
- Released: 19 April 2010
- Recorded: 2007–2009
- Genre: Dream pop; indie pop
- Length: 34:57
- Label: Labrador
- Producer: Johan Duncanson; Martin Carlberg

The Radio Dept. chronology
| Pet Grief (2006) | Clinging to a Scheme (2010) | Passive Aggressive: Singles 2002–2010 (2011) |

Singles from Clinging to a Scheme
- 1. "David" Released: 14 June 2009; 2. "Heaven's on Fire" Released: 24 March 2010; 3. "Never Follow Suit" Released: 23 October 2010

Clinging to a Scheme is the third studio album by Swedish indie pop band The Radio Dept. It was released on 19 April 2010 by Labrador Records.

== Critical reception ==
Professional ratings
Aggregate scores
| Source | Rating |
|---|---|
| AnyDecentMusic? | 7.2/10 |
| Metacritic | 78/100 |
Review scores
| Source | Rating |
| AllMusic | 4/5 stars |
| The Boston Phoenix | 3/4 stars |
| Consequence of Sound | 4.5/5 stars |
| Drowned in Sound | 8/10 |
| NME | 8/10 |
| Now | 4/5 |
| Pitchfork | 8.3/10 |
| PopMatters | 8/10 |
| Q | 3/5 stars |
| Under the Radar | 7/10 |

In 2018, Pitchfork listed Clinging to a Scheme at number 24 on its list of the 30 best dream pop albums.

== Track listing ==
| No. | Title | Writer(s) | Length |
|---|---|---|---|
| 1. | "Domestic Scene" | Johan Duncanson | 2:25 |
| 2. | "Heaven's on Fire" | Duncanson; Martin Carlberg | 3:32 |
| 3. | "This Time Around" | Duncanson; Carlberg | 3:46 |
| 4. | "Never Follow Suit" | Duncanson; Carlberg | 4:09 |
| 5. | "A Token of Gratitude" | Duncanson | 4:07 |
| 6. | "The Video Dept." | Duncanson; Carlberg | 3:25 |
| 7. | "Memory Loss" | Duncanson | 4:17 |
| 8. | "David" | Duncanson | 3:32 |
| 9. | "Four Months in the Shade" | Carlberg | 1:50 |
| 10. | "You Stopped Making Sense" | Duncanson | 3:54 |
| Total length: | | | 34:57 |

== Personnel ==
Credits for Clinging to a Scheme adapted from album liner notes.

The Radio Dept.

- Johan Duncanson
- Martin Carlberg
- Daniel Tjäder

Additional musicians

- Per Blomgren – drums (track 10)
- Mikael Häggström – live drums (track 3)
- Mattias Oldén – saxophone (track 2)

Production

- Johan Duncanson – production
- Martin Carlberg – production
- Johannes Berglund – mastering (track 4)
- Mattias Oldén – mastering (tracks 1, 3, 5–10)
- The Radio Dept. – mastering (track 2)

Artwork and design

- Johan Duncanson – sleeve design

== Charts ==
| Chart (2010) | Peak position |
|---|---|
| Swedish Albums (Sverigetopplistan) | 11 |
| US Heatseekers Albums (Billboard) | 20 |
