= Le Val, Var =

Le Val Lo Vau
- Commune
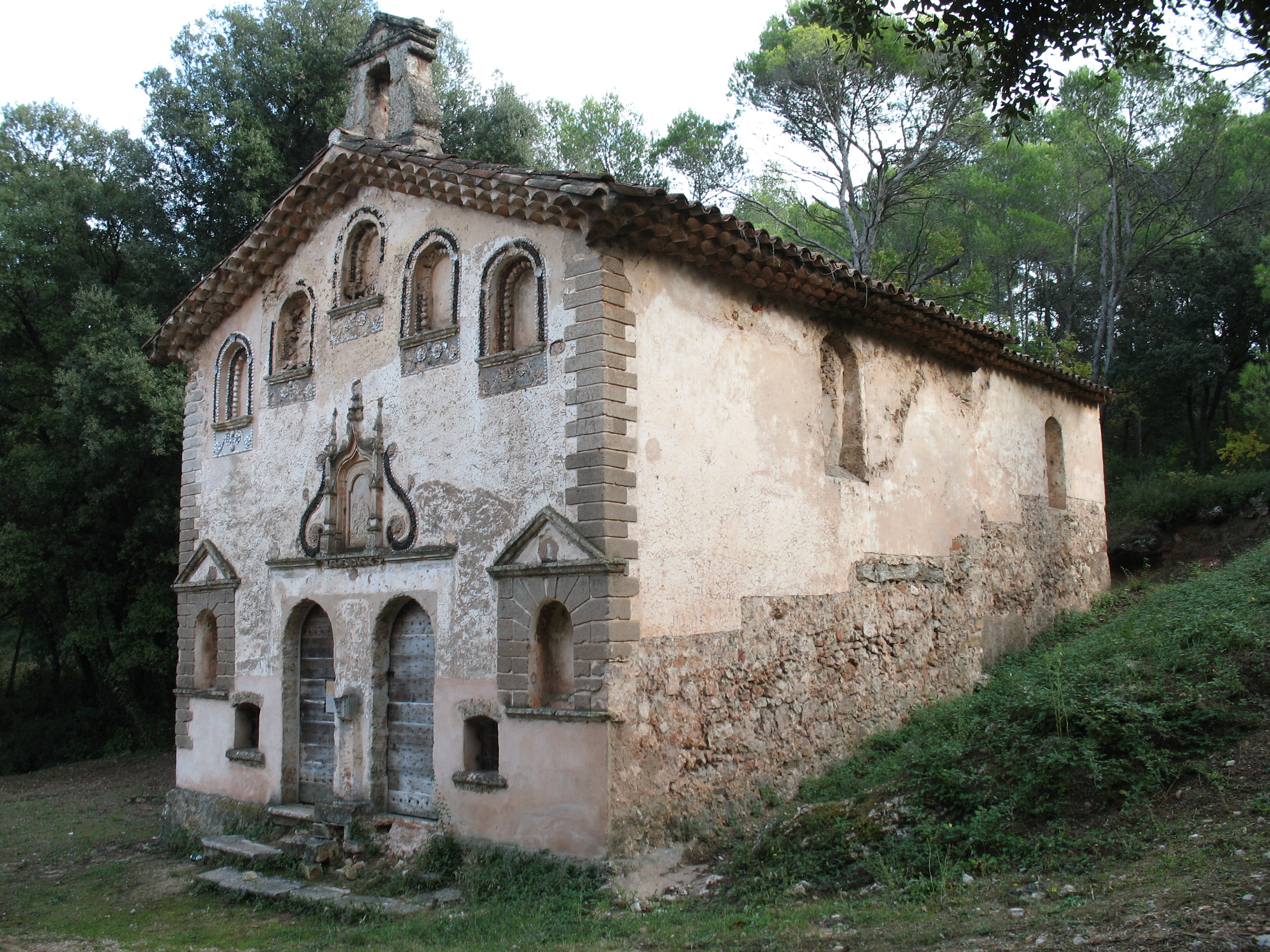
- The chapel of Notre-Dame-de-Pitié, in Val

- Coat of arms
- Location of Le Val
- Location within France Location within Provence-Alpes-Côte d'Azur
- Coordinates: 43°26′25″N 6°04′26″E
- Country: France
- Region: Provence-Alpes-Côte d'Azur
- Department: Var
- Arrondissement: Brignoles
- Canton: Brignoles
- Intercommunality: CA Provence Verte

Government
  - Mayor (2020–2026): Jérémy Giuliano
- Area^{1}: 39.34 km^{2} (15.19 sq mi)
- Elevation: 241 m (791 ft)
- Highest elevation: 540 m (1,770 ft)
- Lowest elevation: 140 m (460 ft)
- Population (2023): 4,335
  - Density: 110.2/km^{2} (285.4/sq mi)
- Time zone: UTC+01:00 (CET)
  - Summer (DST): UTC+02:00 (CEST)
- INSEE/Postal code: 83143 /83143
- ^{1} French Land Register data, which excludes lakes, ponds, glaciers > 1 km^{2} (0.386 sq mi or 247 acres) and river estuaries.

Le Val (French pronunciation: [lə val]; Lo Vau in Occitan) is a commune in the Var department in the Provence-Alpes-Côte d'Azur region in southeastern France.

== Population ==
Historical population
Year	Pop.	±% p.a.
1968	972	—
1975	1,308	+4.33%
1982	1,699	+3.81%
1990	2,893	+6.88%
1999	3,363	+1.69%
2007	3,927	+1.96%
2012	4,198	+1.34%
2017	4,295	+0.46%
2023	4,335	+0.15%
Source: INSEE

== See also ==
- Communes of the Var department
