= The Mary Onettes =

Swedish band

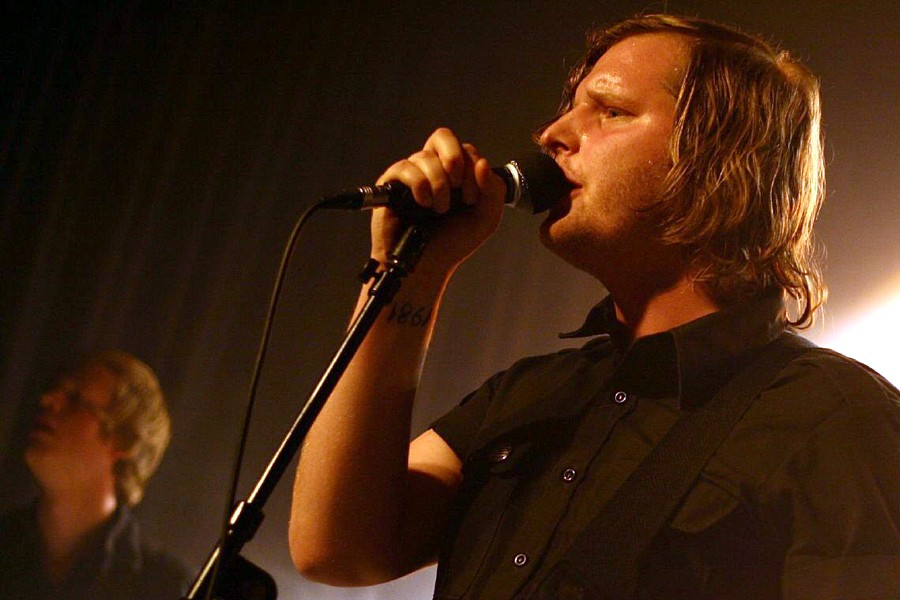
- The Mary Onettes

Background information
- Origin: Jönköping, Sweden
- Genres: Indie rock, dream pop, shoegazing
- Years active: 2000–present
- Labels: Labrador Records, Welfare Sounds & Records
- Members: Philip Ekström; Petter Agurén; Simon Fransson; Henrik Ekström
- Website: The Mary Onettes

The Mary Onettes are an indie rock/dream pop band from Jönköping, Sweden, signed to Labrador Records. To date, the band has released three full-length studio albums and four EPs.

== History ==
The Mary Onettes were formed in 2000 in the Swedish town of Jönköping by Philip Ekström (vocals, guitar), his brother Henrik Ekström (bass), Petter Agurén (guitar) and Simon Fransson (drums). The band was drawn together by their common interest in 1980s and 1990s music, especially bands such as the Stone Roses and the Cure. They earned their first record deal in 2004, but were dropped after only six months without the opportunity to release any recorded material. Columbia/Sony BMG signed the band eight months later, and they released their debut EP, Make Me Last, in May 2005. Following positive critical reception but muted commercial response, they found themselves without a label shortly after the EP's release. The Mary Onettes intended to self-release all material thereafter, but Swedish indie pop label Labrador Records signed the band, and they established a recording studio in Gothenburg.

The band's first release on Labrador was the four-song EP Lost, released in November 2006. Pitchfork described the song "Lost" as "start[ing] out a bit New Order, but it quickly blows up into grand teen-movie hooks that only a grump could find much fault with".

They released their debut full-length studio album, The Mary Onettes, in April 2007, receiving generally positive critical acclaim and favorable comparisons to Echo & the Bunnymen, the Cure, the Church and Shout Out Louds. Treble magazine, in a highly positive review, described the album: "It may sound a bit on the nostalgic side, though its influences merely melt into a greater whole, in which various sounds meld together in synth-pop ecstasy". The first single from the album, "Void," preceded it in March 2007.

Following extensive touring around Europe, and a brief tour of the United States, the band began recording their second album. However, a post from Philip Ekström on the band's official website said, "Last summer I basically lost every song I've ever recorded with the Mary Onettes. My hard drive with all my music was stolen in my car one fine afternoon in Stockholm, the very same fine afternoon we came home from our US tour, the very same day I was feeling thrilled to come home and start the process of finishing our new album. Of course I had made a backup copy on my computer at home. But for some reason a power failure in the building made that hard drive collapse too. Unbelievable. I was speechless for days". The band played the Primavera Sound Festival in Spain in May 2008, and reconvened in the studio to start the recording process again in September.

The band's Dare EP was released in April 2009. They recorded the EP in a small studio in Jönköping, and recorded the string arrangements in a church near the band's hometown. The EP was intended as a sampler of the second album, Islands, which was released on 4 November 2009. The album was also preceded by the single "Puzzles," released on 30 September 2009 as a digital download. Philip Ekström said of the album's name: "The title Islands came up because I see the tracks on the album as small islands in different shapes and forms where every song is like a record of it's [sic] very own. Johan on Labrador Records suggested the same title without having heard me mentioning the idea, so that was a coincidence too good not to pursue. The songs are almost too personal and I've had a hard time playing them for friends. It's like all I want to do is keep them to myself".

In 2011, Philip and Henrik Ekström founded a new group called Det Vackra Livet, featuring much of the same sound and influences of the Mary Onettes, but with lyrics sung in Swedish instead of English.

On 28 February 2012, the Mary Onettes released their fourth EP, Love Forever, produced by ex-STUDIO member Dan Lissvik. The band's third album, Hit the Waves, was released on 12 March 2013, followed by a fourth album, Portico, on 4 March 2014. In November 2016, a new single titled "Juna" was released.

== Discography ==
=== Studio albums ===
- The Mary Onettes (2007, Labrador Records)
- Islands (2009, Labrador Records)
- Hit the Waves (2013, Labrador Records)
- Portico (2014, Labrador Records)
- Sworn (2025, Welfare Sounds & Records)

=== Singles and EPs ===
- Make Me Last EP (2005, Columbia Records)
- Lost EP (2006, Labrador Records)
- Void single (2007, Labrador Records)
- Dare EP (2009, Labrador Records)
- Puzzles digital single (2009, Labrador Records)
- Once I Was Pretty single (2010, Labrador Records)
- The Night Before the Funeral 7" single (2010, Labrador Records)
- Love Forever EP (2012, Labrador Records)
- Evil Coast digital single (2012, Labrador Records)
- Naive Dream single (2014, Labrador)
- Ruins single (2015, Cascine)
- Juna single (2016, Cascine)
- Cola Falls single (2018, Cascine)
- What I Feel in Some Places single (2022, Welfare Sounds & Records)
- Easy Hands single (2023, Welfare Sounds & Records)
- Forever Before Love single (2023, Welfare Sounds & Records)

== Music videos ==
Year	Video	Director	Link
2005	"Make Me Last"		YouTube
2007	"Pleasure Songs"	Petur Mogensen	YouTube
2007	"Explosions"	Petur Mogensen	YouTube
2010	"The Night Before the Funeral"	Philip Ekström	Vimeo
