= Club 8 =

Swedish indie pop duo

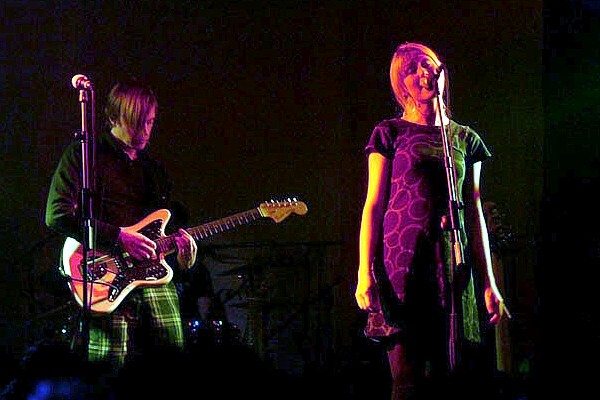

Background information
- Origin: Sweden
- Genres: Indie pop
- Years active: 1995–present
- Labels: Labrador
- Members: Karolina Komstedt; Johan Angergård
- Website: club-8.org

Club 8 is a Swedish musical duo consisting of Karolina Komstedt (from the band Poprace) and Johan Angergård (Acid House Kings, Poprace).

== History ==
Formed in 1995, Club 8 were signed to the Spanish record label Siesta. They released a single called "Me Too" and an album called Nouvelle with an twee pop sound.

In 1998, their second album, The Friend I Once Had, and the single "Missing You" were released. "Missing You" became a club and radio hit in Spain and somewhat of a college radio favorite in the US. The band started playing live. Their first gig was in New York at a March Records CMJ event in 1999. Their sound had by now developed into a more bossa nova and dance-oriented one.

In 2001, Club 8's sound moved toward chill-out and trip hop on their third, self-titled album. In the autumn of 2001, the duo used Stockholm's Summersound Studios, writing songs and experimenting with dub, trip hop, chillout, 1980s, and bossa nova sounds. The resulting album, released in 2002, is named Spring Came, Rain Fell.

The 2003 follow-up album, Strangely Beautiful, peaked at number 18 on the CMJ charts in the US. For the first time since 1999, the band released a single from the album and a corresponding video. Backed by five exclusive tracks, the song "Saturday Night Engine" was released as a single in the spring of 2003. The video made it to number 16 on the Up North chart on MTV Nordic.

Afterward, Angergård formed a band called the Legends, which recorded three albums between 2004 and 2006. He also made an Acid House Kings album in 2005. In 2007, Club 8 released their sixth album, The Boy Who Couldn't Stop Dreaming, on Labrador Records.

Club 8's album The People's Record, was released on 18 May 2010, and was produced by Jari Haapalainen. Their next album, titled Above the City, came out on 21 May 2013.

Club 8 has since released two further studio albums: 2015's Pleasure, and their latest, Golden Island, which came out in 2018.

== Discography ==
=== Studio albums ===
- Nouvelle (1996)
- The Friend I Once Had (1998)
- Club 8 (2001)
- Spring Came, Rain Fell (2002)
- Strangely Beautiful (2003)
- The Boy Who Couldn't Stop Dreaming (2007)
- The People's Record (2010)
- Above the City (2013)
- Pleasure (2015)
- Golden Island (2018)
- A Year with Club 8 (2024)
- Seasonal Echoes (2025)

=== EPs ===
- Summer Songs (2002)
- Saturday Night Engine (2003)
- Jesus, Walk with Me (2008)

=== Singles ===
- "Me Too" (1995)
- "Missing You" (1998)
- "Missing You: The Remixes" (1999)
- "Love in December" (2002)
- "Heaven" (2007)
- "Closer Now" (2010)
- "Shape Up!" (2010)
- "Western Hospitality" (2010)
- "Kill Kill Kill" (2012)
- "Stop Taking My Time" (2013)
- "I'm Not Gonna Grow Old" (2013)
- "Love Dies" (2015)
- "Skin" (2015)
- "Lost" (2017)
- "Breathe" (2017)
- "Give Me Love" (2018)
- "I Wish I Could Mean Something to Someone" (2018)
