= The Radio Dept. =

Swedish indie rock band

- The Radio Dept. playing at Salon İKSV in Istanbul, 2017. From left to right: Martin Carlberg, Elin Almered, Daniel Tjäder, Johan Duncanson

Background information
- Origin: Lund, Sweden
- Genres: Indie pop; electronic; dream pop; shoegaze; indie rock
- Years active: 1998–present
- Labels: Shelflife; Slottet; Labrador; XL; just so!
- Members: Johan Duncanson; Martin Carlberg; Daniel Tjäder
- Past members: Elin Almered; Lisa Carlberg; Per Blomgren; Kim Sjölander
- Website: https://theradiodept.se/

The Radio Dept. (pronounced "the radio department") is a Swedish indie pop band formed in Lund, and currently based in Malmö. It was initially formed by schoolmates Johan Duncanson and Elin Almered in 1995. Martin Carlberg joined in 1998, and by 2001 the band's lineup also included Lisa Carlberg on bass, Per Blomgren on drums, and keyboardist Daniel Tjäder. Following the release of 2004 debut album Lesser Matters, the group's membership has since stabilized to the trio of Johan Duncanson (vocals/guitar), Martin Carlberg (guitar/bass), and Daniel Tjäder (keyboards). Kim Sjölander briefly joined the band on bass for 2005's This Past Week extended play.

The band has earned critical praise for their eclectic sound that incorporates elements of dream pop, shoegaze, indie pop, and electronic music. Debut album Lesser Matters was listed as #9 best album of 2004 by NME magazine. Third studio album Clinging to a Scheme peaked at #20 on the Billboard Heatseeker Albums chart of May 2010, whilst fourth LP Running Out of Love peaked at #19 for November 2016.

They gained further recognition with three of their songs being included by Sofia Coppola on her 2006 film, Marie Antoinette. To date, the band has released four studio albums, eleven EPs and two compilations. In 2002, The band self-released their first two EPs on Slottet. Subsequently, they signed to Swedish label Labrador Records in 2003. The band has since released their new material and back catalog on their proprietary Just So! label, beginning in 2018.

== History ==
The band's logo

=== Origins, early EPs and Lesser Matters (1995–2005) ===
In 1995, schoolmates Elin Almered and Johan Duncanson started a band in Lund, Sweden, which they named after a gas-station-turned-radio-repair-shop called "Radioavdelningen" (Swedish for the Radio Department). However, Almered and Duncanson soon stopped playing music together, putting the project on hiatus.

The band was reformed by Duncanson and Martin Carlberg in 1998, with his then-girlfriend Lisa Carlberg joining on bass in 2001, followed by Per Blomgren on drums and Daniel Tjäder on keyboards. Later in 2001, the band sent recordings to music magazine Sonic, receiving a positive review and being featured on the free CD sampler that came with the magazine. Labrador Records discovered the band from the promotional disc and signed them to their label in 2002.

The band's debut album, Lesser Matters was recorded in Malmö and released on 4 March 2003. The album was well received by the music press, scoring 9 out of 10 in the NME. Per Blomgren left the Radio Dept. prior to the release of this album, but features on it, and Lisa Carlberg departed after the release of This Past Week EP. Elin Almered left the band prior to the recording of the album, but contributed lead vocals on track "Strange Things Will Happen". According to their website, the band decided to use digital drum tracks and stated that for their second album they were "taking a new direction ... which wouldn't require a member that played bass guitar". NME would rank Lesser Matters ninth on their list of the 50 best albums of 2004. The album received an 84/100 (Universal acclaim) on Metacritic from a total of five reviews.

In the summer of 2005, Duncanson moved from Malmö to Stockholm, Sweden and the band would travel between the two cities to record music.

The group enjoyed a slightly more widespread recognition after three tracks, "Pulling Our Weight", "I Don't Like It Like This" and "Keen on Boys" were included on the soundtrack for Sofia Coppola's 2006 film Marie Antoinette.

=== Pet Grief (2006–2009) ===
The band's second album, Pet Grief, released on 12 April 2006 and was recorded in both Malmö and Stockholm. The distorted buzz that adorned most of their debut was now replaced by a synthesizer. The album didn't reach the rest of Europe, including the UK until later in the year. With little touring support, there was no real buzz behind Pet Grief. Reviews were mixed, with the NME rating the album 7/10 and Pitchfork 7.3/10 but other magazines were less positive with The Guardian rating the album 2/5. However, it did find popularity amongst a growing fan base throughout the world, thanks to the internet. The album was made available in the US through Darla Records and through their US distribution deal with Labrador.

At the end of 2006, a new track, "We Made the Team", was released as the 100th release on the Labrador. It was also the final track on the Labrador's labels Compilation of 100 tracks released at the beginning of 2007.

The band released a new EP on 4 June 2008 entitled Freddie And The Trojan Horse on Labrador Records. Another EP, David, was released on 24 June 2009 due to the delay of their upcoming third album and features a photograph by Herbert List as its artwork. The song "David" was also made available for download at no cost by Labrador Records.

=== Clinging to a Scheme (2010–2015) ===
The band released their third album, Clinging to a Scheme, on 19 April 2010. The album was better received by critics than Pet Grief, receiving an 8.3/10 from Pitchfork and an 8 out of 10 from the NME.

On 25 January 2011, their first compilation album, Passive Aggressive: Singles 2002–2010, was released. It features all the A-sides released by the band and many of the B-sides and other rarities. That year they were nominated at the Swedish Grammis in the categories "Album of the Year" and "Band of the Year". In 2011, the band began a tour in the United States and Mexico; in 2012 they visited Latin America, and in 2013 they toured in Turkey and other countries of Asia.

=== Running Out of Love and recent activity (2016–present) ===
The band's fourth and most recent album, Running Out of Love, was released on 21 October 2016. Running Out of Love was shortlisted by IMPALA (The Independent Music Companies Association) for the Album of the Year Award 2016, an award for the best album released on an independent European label.

In August 2018, the band released the single "Going Down Swinging".

In 2019, the band released their second compilation album, I Don't Need Love, I've Got My Band, which includes songs from the EPs Pulling Our Weight and This Past Week. The album was released on their new label, Just So Records.

In 2026, the band confirmed their return to live performance with a headline date at London's Koko on 3 November 2026, as part of Pitchfork Music Festival London, their first London appearance in nearly a decade, following a 2017 show at Scala. The band also confirmed via social media and their website that new music was in progress and that a 20th anniversary vinyl reissue of Pet Grief was planned for some time after summer 2026.

== Contract dispute and transition to independence ==
Between 2002 and 2016, The Radio Dept. was signed to the Swedish indie label Labrador Records under a multi-album contract. In an interview with Sveriges Radio, the band revealed that they had not fully understood the terms of the agreement when they signed it, including clauses that gave Labrador ownership of their master recordings and a publishing contract that extended for the duration of their lives plus 70 years.

As tensions grew over royalties, ownership rights, and creative control, the band attempted to fulfill their contractual obligations with the 2011 compilation Passive Aggressive: Singles 2002–2010, which was rejected by the label as counting toward the album quota. The dispute eventually led to a legal case, which the band lost in the lower court of Sweden, but later settled. Under the terms of the settlement, The Radio Dept. regained control of their back catalogue, including master and publishing rights.

Following this, the band significantly reduced new output and refrained from major releases until the contractual period concluded. In the years after the dispute, they began releasing music and merchandise through their own imprint, Just So! Records, which serves as their independent label for future releases and reissues.

In 2023, the band signed a publishing agreement with Kobalt Music, formally severing their ties with Labrador Records. Beginning in 2018, they have self-released music on their Just So! label.

== Musical style ==
Early in the band's career, they played a brand of wistful and noisy indie rock that incorporated elements of dream pop, shoegaze, and noise pop. In a review of debut album Lesser Matters, K. Ross Hoffman of AllMusic stated they are "an indie rock band who play fuzzed-out, ramshackle pop songs", drawing comparisons of their style to the likes of My Bloody Valentine, Orange Juice, Felt, the Cure, and New Order. Duncanson explained in a 2005 interview that during and prior to recording Lesser Matters, he and Martin Carlberg had been interested in noisy music, and strove to "make noise as much as we wanted to write melodies".

On their sophomore effort, Pet Grief, the band began to pivot away from their early noisy and lo-fi sound to incorporate more electronic elements and cleaner production. By this point of the band, drummer Per Blomgren and bassist Lisa Carlberg had departed; leaving just Duncanson, (Martin) Carlberg, and Tjäder. In a 2026 interview with The Line of Best Fit, Duncanson recalled, “We steered away from anything that would make anyone think rock. We'd become a bit sceptical about guitars altogether. For a while we said it would be a completely electronic record and no one could accuse us of being rockers.” On their now-defunct fansite around the time of the album's release, they cited influences such as Charles Aznavour, Saint Etienne, Broadcast, Frank Sinatra, Joy Division, Pet Shop Boys, Chet Baker, Fennesz, Nick Drake, Kevin Rowland, Prefab Sprout, Paddy McAloon, Junior Boys, Orange Juice, Kraftwerk, Neu!, Jonathan Richman, the Avalanches and the Pale Fountains.

From Clinging to a Scheme and onward, the band began to incorporate elements of dub, hip-hop, and dance music into their sound. Speaking on this new fusion, Duncanson listed his inspirations as Andrew Weatherall, Midi, Maxi & Efti, Marine Girls, Young Marble Giants, Isabelle Antena, the Blue Nile, Style Council, Marvin Gaye, Dusty Springfield, in addition to 1970s folk music, Philadelphia soul, and lovers rock. The band had also strived for a gritty production style as found on Wu-Tang Clan's Enter the Wu-Tang and Sonic Youth's The Whitey Album. 2016's Running Out of Love marked their further foray into electronic and dance music, with the band ascribing its sound to their paying homage to 1990s techno and house.

== Band members ==
Current

- Johan Duncanson – vocals, guitar (1995–present)
- Martin Carlberg, né Larsson – guitar, bass (1998–present)
- Daniel Tjäder – keyboards (2001–present)

Past

- Elin Almered – vocals (1995–2003; occasional touring member)
- Lisa Carlberg – bass (2001–2005)
- Per Blomgren – drums (2001–2003)
- Kim Sjölander – bass (2004–2005)

Timeline

== Discography ==
- Lesser Matters (2003)
- Pet Grief (2006)
- Clinging to a Scheme (2010)
- Running Out of Love (2016)
