= Labrador Records =

Swedish record label

Labrador Records is a Sweden-based record label, specializing in indie pop and the twee subgenre.

== History ==
Labrador was founded by Bengt Rahm in 1997 in Malmö, modeled on niche British record companies and Swedish fanzines like A Zero One and Benno. One of the first bands to be signed was the Swedish group Club 8. Club 8 member Johan Angergård had previously run the Summersound Recordings record company together with members of the band Acid House Kings. Eventually, Summersound and Labrador joined under the moniker Labrador Records and the new company's headquarters were transferred to Stockholm. Johan Angergård was responsible for "everything that had to do with the music" while the graphic designer Mattias Berglund handled covers, websites, and posters. Bengt Rahm remained as a partner. In 2018, Johan Angergård decided to step back and tend to other business. Since then, the label has been run by founder Bengt Rahm.

== Artists ==
=== Current ===
- Tan Cologne
- Jesper Zacco
- Acid House Kings
- Club 8
- Det Vackra Livet
- ingenting
- Johan Hedberg
- The Legends
- Little Big Adventure
- Amanda Mair
- Pallers
- Pelle Carlberg
- Sambassadeur
- The Sound of Arrows
- Starlet
- Suburban Kids with Biblical Names

=== Earlier ===
- Aerospace
- Cinnamon
- Afraid of Stairs
- Happydeadmen
- Airliner
- Chasing Dorotea
- Corduroy Utd.
- Irene
- Douglas Heart
- Edson
- Lasse Lindh
- Laurel Music
- Leslies
- Loveninjas
- The Mary Onettes
- Mondial
- Ronderlin
- South Ambulance
- The Sound of Arrows
- Tribeca
- Waltz for Debbie
- Wan Light
- The Radio Dept.

== See also ==
- List of record labels
