= Celebrity Big Brother (British TV series) series 2 =

Coordinates: 51°39′23″N 0°16′02″W

Celebrity Big Brother
- Series 2
- Series two logo
- Presented by: Davina McCall
- No. of days: 10
- No. of housemates: 6
- Winner: Mark Owen
- Runner-up: Les Dennis
- Companion shows: Big Brother's Little Brother; Big Brother Live
- No. of episodes: 12

Release
- Original network: Channel 4
- Original release: 20 November – 29 November 2002

Series chronology
- ← Previous; Series 1 Next → Series 3

Celebrity Big Brother 2002, also known as Celebrity Big Brother 2, is the second series of the British reality television series Celebrity Big Brother. It was broadcast on Channel 4 in the UK, launching on 20 November 2002, and ending on 29 November 2002, lasting ten days. Proceeds from viewer voting went to four different charities: Centrepoint, National Missing Persons Helpline, Rethink and Samaritans. The series was sponsored by phone company O2. Les Dennis is commonly remembered for his depression during the series following his split from wife Amanda Holden.

== Format ==
Celebrity Big Brother is a game show in which a group of celebrity contestants, referred to as housemates, live in isolation from the outside world in a custom built "house", constantly under video surveillance. During their time in the House, the housemates are required to nominate two of their fellow contestants for potential eviction, and the two or more with the most votes would be nominated. This process is mandatory for all housemates, and failure to comply could result in expulsion from the House. The public then vote, with one of those celebrities evicted from the house. When the final week arrives, the viewers vote for which of the remaining celebrities should win the series, and the housemate with the most votes becomes the winner.

During their time in the House, housemates are given weekly tasks to perform. The housemates wager a portion of their weekly shopping budget on the task, and either win double their wagered fund or lose the wagered fund depending on their performance in the task. The housemates are required to work as a group to complete their tasks, with the format of the tasks varying based on the number of remaining housemates. Throughout the series, some housemates have been given secret tasks that must either be completed individually or with a small group; failure to do so can result in the housemate being nominated or punished in the House. Should the housemates run out of the food provided for them, an emergency ration was available to them. The housemates are forbidden from discussing nominations, and doing so could result in punishment. The format of the series is mainly seen as a social experiment, and requires housemates to interact with others who may have differing ideals, beliefs, and prejudices. Housemates are also required to make visits to the Diary Room during their stay in the House, where they are able to share their thoughts and feelings on their fellow housemates and the game.

== Housemates ==
Celebrity	Age on entry	Notability	Day entered	Day exited	Result
Mark Owen	30	Take That member	1	10	Winner
Les Dennis	49	Family Fortunes presenter	1	10	Runner-up
Melinda Messenger	31	Glamour model and television presenter	1	10	3rd place
Sue Perkins	33	Comedian and television presenter	1	9	Evicted
Anne Diamond	48	Journalist and television presenter	1	7	Evicted
Goldie	37	DJ	1	5	Evicted

=== Anne Diamond ===
Anne Diamond (born 8 September 1954) is an English radio and television presenter. She hosted Good Morning Britain on TV-am and the similarly titled Good Morning... with Anne and Nick, alongside co-presenter Nick Owen. However, her presenting style has attracted accusations of "dumbing down". On Day 1, Anne was second to enter the house. On Day 7, she became the second housemate to be evicted from the house, after receiving 50.6% of the public vote.

=== Goldie ===
Goldie (born Clifford Joseph Price; 19 September 1965) is a British musician, actor and DJ, well known for his innovations to the jungle and drums and bass music genres. His first studio album Timeless entered the UK Albums Chart at number seven, whilst another Saturnz Return entered at fifteen. Aside from his musical career, his television and film acting credits include The World Is Not Enough, Snatch, Everybody Loves Sunshine, and playing gangster Angel Hudson in EastEnders. He was the first to enter the house on Day 1 and was the first celebrity to be evicted on Day 5.

=== Les Dennis ===
Les Dennis (born Leslie Dennis Heseltine; 12 October 1953) is a British comedian, television presenter, and actor, best known for presenting Family Fortunes from 1987 to 2002. He was fifth to enter the house on Day 1. Dennis was commonly remembered in the series for his depression, which was caused following his split from then-wife Amanda Holden. He later described his time in the house as "not one of his wisest moves". However, he continued to be on programme and was declared the runner-up.

=== Mark Owen ===
Mark Owen (born 27 January 1972) is an English singer-songwriter, known for being a member of pop group Take That. After the band split up in 1996, Owen became the first ex-member to release solo material. His debut studio album Green Man charted at number 33, which included the singles "Child", "Clementine" and "I Am What I Am". On Day 1, Mark was sixth to enter the house. He was later announced as the winner of the series, earning 77% of the public vote and beating Les. He broke down in tears when he left the house, overwhelmed by the fans' support.

=== Melinda Messenger ===
Melinda Messenger (born 23 February 1971) is an English former glamour model and television presenter, most notable for posing topless for Page 3 in The Sun. She continued to work for The Sun until readers voted to ban models with breast implants. On Day 1, Melinda was fourth to enter the house. Whilst in the house, she was described as a "blonde Vulcan" by Sue, who questioned her apparent lack of emotions. She reached third place during the series' final, on Day 10.

=== Sue Perkins ===
Sue Perkins (born 22 September 1969) is a British comedian, broadcaster, actress and writer, who rose to prominence through her comedy partnership with Mel Giedroyc in Mel and Sue. Sue was third to enter the house on Day 1. During her time in the house, she had notable moments with Mark and Les. She was third to be evicted from the house on Day 9, with 75% of the public vote.

== Nominations table ==
	Day 3	Day 6	Day 7	Day 10 Final		Nominations received
Mark	Les, Melinda	Not eligible	Sue, Melinda	Winner (Day 10)		3
Les	Goldie, Sue	Sue, Anne	Mark, Sue	Runner-up (Day 10)		3
Melinda	Goldie, Anne	Not eligible	Sue, Mark	Third place (Day 10)		4
Sue	Goldie, Les	Not eligible	Melinda, Mark	Evicted (Day 9)		6
Anne	Goldie, Sue	Not eligible	Evicted (Day 7)			2
Goldie	Les, Melinda	Evicted (Day 5)				4
Notes	none	1	none	2		
Against public vote	Goldie, Les	Anne, Sue	Mark, Sue	Les, Mark, Melinda		
Evicted	Goldie; 56% to evict	Anne; 50.6% to evict	Sue; 75% to evict	Melinda; Fewest votes to win (out of 3)	Les; 23% to win (out of 2)	
Evicted	Goldie; 56% to evict	Anne; 50.6% to evict	Sue; 75% to evict	Mark; 77% to win (out of 2)		

Notes

- ^Note 1: Les, who failed a task, was the only person allowed to nominate.
- ^Note 2: The public were voting for the Housemate they wanted to win rather than to evict.

== Viewership ==
These viewing figures are taken from BARB.

Day	Viewers (millions)	
Sat		2.32
Sun		4.32
Mon		4.11
Tue		4.78
Wed	7.6	4.15
Thu	4.72	4.24
Fri	3.01	2.72
Fri	4.95	5.42
Series average	4.36	
