= Land of Dreams (Mark Owen album) =

Studio album by Mark Owen
- Released: 23 September 2022
- Recorded: 2021–2022
- Genres: Pop rock, funk rock, disco pop, indie rock, pop, country pop
- Length: 43:50
- Label: BMG
- Producers: Stefan Mac; Harrison Kipner; Jennifer Decilveo

Mark Owen chronology
The Art of Doing Nothing (2013)	Land of Dreams (2022)

Singles from Land of Dreams
- 1. "You Only Want Me" Released: 19 May 2022; 2. "Are You Looking for Billy?" Released: 10 June 2022; 3. "Magic" Released: 10 August 2022

Professional ratings
Review scores
Source	Rating
Retro Pop	4/5 stars

Land of Dreams is the fifth solo studio album from Take That band member Mark Owen. The album was released on 23 September 2022, nine years after his fourth album. The album was preceded by three singles: "You Only Want Me", "Are You Looking for Billy?" and "Magic".

== Background ==
On 1 February 2022, it was revealed that Owen had been writing new material. A source close to Owen said, "He has been writing some songs and they are sounding pretty good. It's said the singer will be performing at the Isle of Wight Festival in June, It is early days, but he is [...] toying with the idea of another solo record. Nothing is nailed down, but given he has done a solo album every 10 years or so for the last two decades, now feels like a nice time to think about it again."

== Commercial performance ==
On the midweek UK Albums Chart dated 26 September 2022, Land of Dreams was at number two. On 30 September 2022, the album debuted at number 5 on the UK Official Albums Chart Top 100, and at number 3 on the UK Album Downloads and Sales Charts.

== Track listing ==
Land of Dreams track listing
No.	Title	Writer(s)	Producer(s)	Length
1.	"Superpower"	Mark Owen; Mich Hansen; Jacob Ubizz; Scott Quinn	Stefan Mac; Harrison Kipner; Cutfather^{[a]}; Jacob Ubizz^{[a]}	2:50
2.	"You Only Want Me"	Owen; Will Bloomfield	Jennifer Decilveo; Bloomfield^{[b]}	3:26
3.	"Boy"	Owen; Steve Booker	Decilveo	3:47
4.	"Magic"	Owen; Jeff Trott; Scott Stepakoff; Decilveo	Decilveo	3:39
5.	"Being Human"	Owen; Bastian Langebæk	Decilveo	4:07
6.	"Rio"	Owen; Hansen; Peter Wallevik; Daniel Davidsen; Fraser Churchill	Decilveo	3:34
7.	"Are You Looking for Billy?"	Owen; Gannin Arnold	Mac; Kipner	4:30
8.	"Come Back"	Owen; Hansen; Ubizz; Quinn	Mac; Kipner; Cutfather^{[a]}; Jacob Ubizz^{[a]}; Ryan Carline^{[c]}	3:53
9.	"Starwoman"	Owen; Ben Mark; Jamie Norton	Mac; Kipner; Carline^{[c]}	3:40
10.	"Last of the Heroes"	Owen; Gary Barlow; Charlie Deakin-Davis	Owen; Decilveo; Jack Kleinick^{[b]}	3:01
11.	"Gone, Gone, Gone"	Owen; Mark	Mac; Kipner	3:29
12.	"World"	Owen; Mark; Norton; Mac; Kipner	Mac; Kipner	3:54
Total length:				43:50

=== Notes ===
- ^a signifies a co-producer
- ^b signifies an additional producer
- ^c signifies a vocal producer

== Charts ==
Chart performance for Land of Dreams
Chart (2022)	Peak position
Belgian Albums (Ultratop Wallonia)	118
Scottish Albums (Official Charts)	2
Spanish Albums (Promusicae)	75
UK Albums (Official Charts)	5
UK Independent Albums (Official Charts)	2

=== Tour ===
Owen announced a small UK tour on 19 May 2022. The Land Of Dreams Tour performed across Bristol, Manchester, Glasgow and London, where Owen played at the O2 Shepherd's Bush Empire on October 20. Tickets went on sale at 9am on 27 May 2022.

=== Setlist ===
Average setlist:

1. "Superpower" (vocal performed from backstage)
2. "You Only Want Me"
3. "Shine" (Take That song)
4. "Rio"
5. "Are You Looking for Billy?"
6. "Boy"
7. "Clementine"
8. "Four Minute Warning"
9. "The Flood" (Take That song)
10. "Ask Him To"
11. "Makin' Out"
12. "Us and Ours"
13. "Green Man"
14. "Come Back"
15. "Starwoman"
16. "Last of the Heroes"
17. "Gone, Gone, Gone"
18. "My Love"
19. "Rule the World" (Take That song)
20. "Hold Up a Light" (Take That song)

Encore:

1. "Stars"
2. "Child"
3. "Magic"
4. "These Days" (Take That song)
5. "World"
6. "Being Human"
