= Craig Leon =

American record producer

- Born: 7 January 1952 (age 74); Miami, Florida, United States
- Genres: Classical; electronic; folk; pop
- Occupations: Composer, arranger, producer
- Years active: 1966–present
- Labels: Sony, Decca, DGG, EMI, Virgin, Takoma, Enigma, Aparte/Atlas, Warner Music
- Website: craigleon.com

Craig Leon (born 7 January 1952) is an American-born record producer, composer and arranger currently living in England. Leon was instrumental in launching the careers of many recording artists including the Ramones, Suicide, Talking Heads and Blondie.

Active in pop music production from 1974 to 1998, Leon has focused on classical composition, orchestration, arrangement and recording from 1998 to the present. His work appears on many classical recordings with artists including Luciano Pavarotti, Andreas Scholl, Sir James Galway, Joshua Bell, The London Chamber Orchestra, Dresden Staatskapelle Orchestra, Sinfonietta Cracovia, The Royal Philharmonic Orchestra and The London Symphony Orchestra.

== Career ==
Craig Leon was born in Miami, Florida, and raised in Fort Myers, Florida. After opening his own recording studio in Miami, Florida, In 1973, he moved to New York when he was hired as assistant to producer Richard Gottehrer at Sire Records. There he was responsible for the discovery and early development of the Ramones and Talking Heads, amongst other artists. In New York, Leon also produced recordings by Blondie, Richard Hell, Suicide and many other artists connected with the burgeoning New York scene. Leon has produced over 150 LP's & CD's of alternative pop music over the years.

In 1981, Leon produced his own first recorded work, "Nommos", which was released on John Fahey's Takoma Records later that year. This was followed by "Visiting" in 1982, recorded for Enigma Records. After relocating to the UK in late 1983, Leon continued producing pop and alternative recordings, and also wrote and recorded "Klub Anima" for the Kosh Dance Theatre piece. In 1998, Leon produced the comeback No Exit by Blondie.

Since 1998, Leon had been exclusively producing, orchestrating and recording classical projects including work with Luciano Pavarotti, Andreas Scholl and the Orpheus Chamber Orchestra, Elysium, the Vienna Radio Symphony Orchestra, the London Symphony Orchestra, Joshua Bell and the Academy of St Martin in the Fields, and Sir James Galway.

In 2011 Leon completed the Sony Classical recording of Midwinter's Eve: Music For Christmas featuring his orchestrations and arrangements of Christmas music performed by The London Chamber Orchestra conducted by Christopher Warren-Green.

In 2012 he also completed writing, production and arrangement work on the new album by noted Irish folk artist Méav which was released in September 2013 on Atlas Réalisations through Warner Music in Ireland and reached number 3 on the Irish national pop album charts. Worldwide releases to follow in 2014.

As well as numerous UK and foreign television programmes Leon's work has featured in major films including 1917, The Karate Kid(2010), Ghost River, Ladies in Lavender, 200 Cigarettes, Sid and Nancy and Revenge of the Nerds amongst many others.

Leon has also turned to work combining audio and visual imagery. In 2012 he has completed work as an audio/visual producer and musical director/composer of the PBS broadcast Quest Beyond The Stars which was filmed in the UK and commenced broadcasting in June 2012 and the U.K. produced Discovery Network broadcast "Orbit:Journey to the Moon" which was viewed on the 40th anniversary of the Apollo Moon Landing.

In 2013, Nommos, an avant-garde electronic album that was originally released on Takoma Records in 1981, was reissued as a vinyl-only limited edition paving the way for the full release of both early electronic works written by Leon, "Nommos" and "Visiting", in April 2014. Leon has been performing both works at selected venues in the U.S. and Europe in 2014–16 including Moogfest, the CTM Festival and the Unsound Festival.

He has also completed the production of the opening and closing ceremony for the Dubai World Cup 2014 which was broadcast on 29 March 2014.

An album, Bach to Moog, featuring works of J.S. Bach arranged for the newly reissued Moog model 55 modular synthesizer and performed by Leon with the Sinfonietta Cracovia, was issued on 4 May 2015 by Sony Classical. The recording celebrates the 50th anniversary of the Moog modular synthesizer. The arrangements are for synthesizer, violin and orchestra incorporating the synthesizer as a solo instrument, a member of the ensemble and a processor of the music played by the acoustic instruments.

2016 saw the release of the 40th Anniversary Edition Box Set of the first Ramones album by Warner Music which was produced by Leon.

A French album of Leon's instrumental arrangements of Christmas music performed by the L'Orchestre d'Auvergne conducted by Craig Leon was released in November 2016 by Harmonia Mundi.

The latest project released on his Atlas Réalisations label distributed through PIAS Classics is The Film Scores and Original Orchestral Music of George Martin, performed by The Berlin Music Ensemble and conducted by Craig Leon which was released on 10 November 2017.

Leon's The Canon: The Anthology of Interplanetary Folk Music Volume 2, is an electronic album released on 10 May 2019 on RVNG Intl.

== Discography ==
=== Classical records produced, composed or arranged ===
- The Berlin Music Ensemble conducted by Craig Leon - George Martin: The Film Scores and Original Orchestral Compositions- Atlas Realisations/PIAS
- L'Orchestre d'Auvergne conducted by Craig Leon - Célébration: 10 siècles de musique de Noël Aparte/Harmonia Mundi
- Craig Leon - Bach to Moog Sinfonietta Cracovia (Orchestra) Jennifer Pike ( Violin)Sony Classical
- Various Artists- "Quest Beyond The Stars" Original Soundtrack - Atlas Realisations/Warner Music
- The London Chamber Orchestra / Christopher Warren Green - Craig Leon: Midwinter's Eve: Music For Christmas - Sony Classical
- Joshua Bell / Academy of St Martin in the Fields - Romance of the Violin - Sony Classical 2003
- James Galway / London Symphony Orchestra - Wings of Song - Deutsche Grammophon
- Charles Tomlinson Griffes Roman Sketches, Op. 7 No. 3 'The Fountain of the Acqua Paola' arranged by Craig Leon / Erich Korngold - Symphonic Serenade op. 65 - London Symphony Orchestra conducted by S. Pittau - ASV/Universal
- Andreas Scholl and the Orpheus Chamber Orchestra - Wayfaring Stranger - Decca
- Ophelié Gaillard and The Royal Philharmonic Orchestra - Dreams Aparte / Harmonia Mundi
- Elysium - Decca
- Various Artists - Cinema Italiano: A New Interpretation Of Italian Film Music - Decca
- Natasha Marsh / London Symphony Orchestra - Amour - EMI Classics
- Julia Thornton - Harpistry - EMI Classics
- Isobel Cooper - Izzy - Decca
- Isobel Cooper - Izzy - Ascolta/EMI Classics
- Isobel Cooper - Izzy - New Dawn - EMI Classics
- Jos Slovick - I Am A Poor Wayfaring Stranger from 1917 (Original Motion Picture Soundtrack) - Sony Classical

=== Contemporary records produced or co-produced ===
- Ramones – Ramones - Sire (1976)
- Blondie – Blondie - Chrysalis
- Blondie - X Offender (Single) - Private Stock
- Suicide – Suicide - Red Star
- Richard Hell & The Voidoids – Blank Generation EP - Stiff (UK)
- Various Artists – Live At CBGB's - The Home Of Underground Rock - Atlantic, 1976
- Martha Veléz & The Wailers – Escape From Babylon - Phonogram
- Chilliwack – Rockerbox - Sire
- Willie Alexander and the Boom Boom Band – MCA
- Willie Alexander and the Boom Boom Band – Meanwhile... Back in the States – MCA
- DMZ—Bomp
- The Weirdos – Life of Crime - Bomp
- The Zeros- Wimp - Bomp
- Sir Douglas Quintet - Border Wave -Chrysalis
- Sir Douglas Quintet – Live - Chrysalis
- Rodney Crowell - What Will The Neighbours Think – Warner Bros.
- Moon Martin - Escape From Domination – Capitol
- Moon Martin - Shots From A Cold Nightmare – Capitol
- Guy Clark - Heartbroke (single)- Warner Bros.
- Dwight Twilley - Twilley - Arista
- The Roches - Keep On Doing – Warner Bros.
- The Fabulous Thunderbirds - "Tex" Soundtrack – Disney
- The Bangles - Bangles EP - I.R.S. Records
- 45 Grave - Sleep In Safety – Enigma
- The Fibonnaccis - Tumour EP – Enigma
- Arthur Brown And Craig Leon – The Complete Tapes Of Atoya - Plexus,1984
- Berlin - Pleasure Victim (remix) – Geffen
- Berlin - Sex (I'm A...) / The Metro (Craig Leon Remix) - Geffen, 1984
- The Beat Farmers - Van Go - MCA
- Jeffrey Lee Pierce - Wildweed — Statik
- Jeffrey Lee Pierce – Flamingo EP - Statik
- The Sound - Live-Mix
- Flesh for Lulu - Blue Sisters Swing EP - Statik
- Flesh for Lulu - Big Fun City - Statik
- Doctor & the Medics - Laughing at The Pieces - I.R.S. Records
- Doctor & the Medics – Spirit in the Sky - I.R.S. Records
- The Pogues - Haunted - Sid & Nancy Soundtrack - MCA
- The Men They Couldn't Hang - Ghosts of Cable Street - MCA
- Andy Pawlak - Shoebox Full of Secrets — Fontana
- The Go Betweens - Tallulah - Beggars Banquet
- Spy vs Spy – Trash the Planet – WEA
- Snakeman Show / Sheena & The Rokkets – Snakeman Show In The '90s (The Adrian Sherwood Remix) / Sheena & The Rokkets In The '90s (The Craig Leon Remix) - Alfa Records, 1991
- Gamine - Dream Boy - Barclay (France)
- The Primitives - Lovely - RCA
- Adult Net - The Honey Tangle - Phonogram, 1989
- Intastella - Intastella And The Family Of People - MCA
- The Chameleons - Script of The Bridge - Statik
- The Sound - Live - Statik
- The Records - Crashes - Atlantic
- The Records – Teenarama – Remix - Atlantic
- John Trubee - Blind Man's Penis - Enigma
- Brave Combo - Urban Grown-ups EP - Four Dots
- Shawn Phillips - Live -RCA
- Mark Owen - Green Man – BMG, 1996
- Mark Owen - Child (single) – BMG
- Mark Owen - Clementine (single) - BMG
- Cowboy Junkies - Miles From Our Home [String Arrangements - Craig Leon] - Geffen
- Martin Phillipps & The Chills - Sunburnt — Flying Nun, 1996
- Cobalt 60 (Front 242) - Elemental CD - Edel
- Psyched Up Janis - Swell - Replay Records
- Angel Corpus Christi - Candy 12" Remix - Almo
- Angel Corpus Christi - White Courtesy Phone - Almo
- Eugenius - Mary Queen of Scots - Atlantic
- Giorgia Fumanti - From My Heart – EMI
- Kid Creole and the Coconuts - KC2 Plays K2C - Sony (Japan)
- Front 242 - 06:21:03:11 Up Evil - PIAS/Epic (1993)
- The Fall - Code: Selfish - Phonogram
- The Fall - Shiftwork - Phonogram, 1991
- The Fall - Extricate - Phonogram, 1990
- New F.A.D. (Fast Automatic Daffodils) - Body Exit Mind — PIAS/Elektra
- Jesus Jones - Liquidizer - EMI
- Shonen Knife - Let's Knife - Virgin
- Phillip Boa & The Voodooclub - Helios - Polydor (Germany)
- Phillip Boa & The Voodooclub - Boaphenia - Polydor (Germany)
- Blondie - No Exit – BMG (1999)
- Blondie - Maria (single) - BMG
- The Cesarians – Cesarians 1 – Imprint
- Steve Hogarth – Ice Cream Genius – Poison Apple, 1997
- Bell'aria - Little Italy - EMI
- The Thought – The Thought – MCA
- Méav – The Calling – Atlas Realisations/Warner

=== Recordings performed ===
- Craig Leon - The Canon: The Anthology of Interplanetary Folk Music Vol. 2 - RVNG Intl., 2019
- Berlin Music Ensemble conducted by Craig Leon - George Martin: The Film Scores And Original Orchestral Music Of George Martin - Atlas Realisations/PIAS, 2018
- Orchestre d’Auvergne / Craig Leon (arrangements & direction) - CÉLÉBRATION: 10 siècles de musique de Noël - Aparté / Harmonia Mundi, 2016
- Craig Leon - Bach To Moog (A Realisation For Electronics And Orchestra) | Sinfonietta Cracovia (Orchestra), Jennifer Pike (Violin) - Sony Classical, 2015
- Craig Leon - Early Electronic Works-Nommos/Visiting - Atlas / Aparté / Harmonia Mundi
- Craig Leon - Nommos/Visiting - The Anthology of Interplanetary Folk Music Vol. 1 - RVNG Intl.
- Craig Leon - Nommos - Takoma
- Craig Leon - Visiting - Arbitor/Enigma
- Craig Leon - Klub Anima Sound Track-Psi
- Cassell Webb - Llano - Virgin
- Cassell Webb - The Thief of Sadness - Venture
- Cassell Webb - Songs of a Stranger - Virgin
- Cassell Webb - Conversation At Dawn - Virgin
- Cassell Webb - House of Dreams - China Records
