= Hail Mary (Mark Owen song) =

Single by Mark Owen

from the album How the Mighty Fall
- B-side: "The Greatest Love Song"
- Released: 2 December 2005
- Recorded: 2004–2005
- Genre: Pop
- Length: 3:58 (Radio Edit)
- Label: Sedna (UK); Edel (ROW)
- Songwriter: Mark Owen
- Producer: Tony Hoffer

Mark Owen singles chronology
"Believe in the Boogie" (2005)	"Hail Mary" (2005)	"Stars" (2013)

"Hail Mary" is the third and final single from Take That band member Mark Owen's third solo studio album, How the Mighty Fall. The single was released on 2 December 2005. The song was recorded at Sunset Studios in Los Angeles between August 2004 and January 2005. The single received little to no promotion due to the reunion of Take That. The video for the track involves Owen playing a grand piano in a mansion hall, as well as lying on a bed while performing the song. Marta Kierblewska was cast as "Mary".

== Track listing ==
UK CD single

1. "Hail Mary" (Radio Edit) - 3:58
2. "The Greatest Love Song" - 4:21

German CD single

1. "Hail Mary" (Radio Edit) - 3:58
2. "The Greatest Love Song" - 4:21
3. "Hail Mary" (Full Length Version) - 5:21
4. "Hail Mary" (Acoustic Version) - 3:37
5. "Believe In The Boogie" (Video) - 3:41
6. "Hail Mary" (Video) - 3:58
