= Land of Dreams =

Land of Dreams can refer to:

- Land of Dreams (mythology)
- Land of Dreams (Randy Newman album), a 1988 album by Randy Newman
- Land of Dreams (1988 film), a 1988 Swedish film
- Land of Dreams (1993 film), a 1993 Egyptian film
- Land of Dreams (2021 film), a 2021 American film
- Land of Dreams (Mark Owen album), a 2022 album by Mark Owen
- A fantasy novel by James P. Blaylock
- A song by Rosanne Cash
- A song by Eddie Heywood and Norman Gimbel
