= Cassell Webb =

American musician

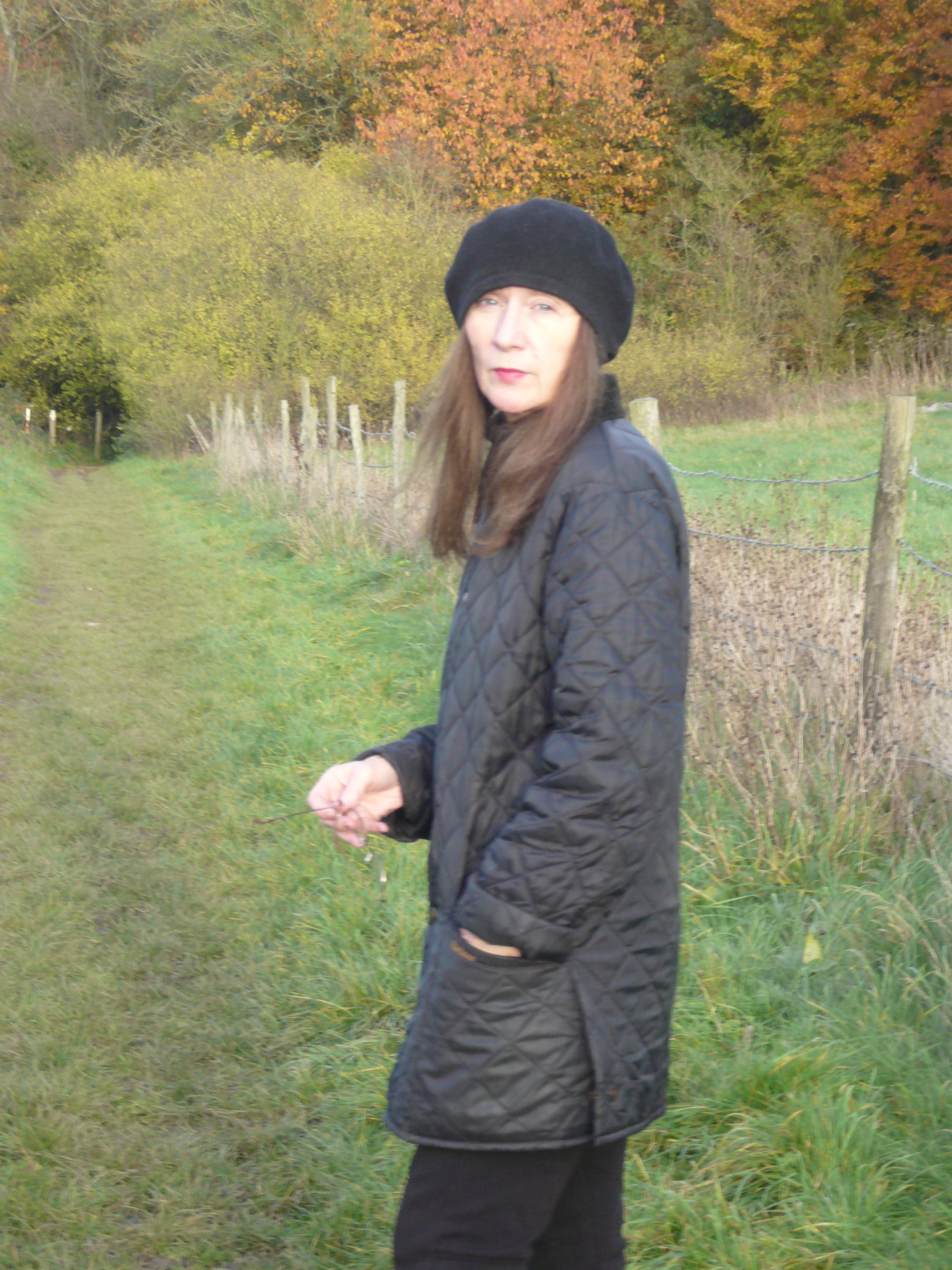
- Cassell Webb 2011

Background information
- Born: San Antonio, Texas, U.S.
- Genres: Folk, pop
- Occupations: Singer, songwriter, producer
- Years active: 1965–present
- Labels: Virgin, Ode, International Artists, China, Atlas

Cassell Webb is a British–American musician and producer, whose musical career has incorporated psychedelia, country music, folk rock, and progressive rock.

== Biography ==
Born in Llano, Texas, United States, in the late 1940s, Webb began playing guitar at 14 and later became involved with the psychedelic scene in San Antonio. She became a member of the Children, a psychedelic group that was part of Lelan Rogers' stable of artists, appearing on their 1968 Rebirth album and several singles. She later joined Saddlesore, a Texas combo whose core members, Mayo Thompson, Frank Davis and Rick Barthelme, were former members of Red Krayola, another Rogers-managed act. Saddlesore recorded one single in 1971 ("Old Tom Clark b/w Pig Ankle Strut") on the independent record label Texas Revolution before shortly disbanding.

Webb spent time in California and New York working as a session singer and acquiring some knowledge of production, before returning to Texas, where she spent the next few years working with country artists such as Jerry Jeff Walker, Guy Clark, and B. W. Stevenson. It was around the time she began writing songs that she also began her long association with songwriter/producer Craig Leon.

Webb went to Europe in the early 1980s, first to the Netherlands and then to England, where she settled permanently and began her solo recording career. She initially signed to the small independent label Statick Records, recording her debut album, Llano, before later joining the roster of Venture Records, an off-shoot of Richard Branson's Virgin Records label, where she recorded Thief of Sadness in 1987. Webb's third album, Songs of a Stranger, was derived from her concert repertory of other artists' music, including Jimmy Webb ("P.F. Sloan"), Nick Drake ("Time Has Told Me"), Townes Van Zandt ("If I Needed You"), and Phil Ochs ("Jim Dean of Indiana").

Webb remained in England, subsequently working on radio programs including Saturday Sequence, periodically releasing albums and working on other projects, such as the dance score "Klub Anima" (co-written with Leon), and singing and production work with artists such as Marillion's Steve Hogarth. She has also released poetry through the Pen & Ink publishing house. Webb's version of the Rolling Stones track "Tell Me," from her 1990 album Conversations at Dawn, was included on the Connoisseur Collection's Jagger/Richard Songbook CD. Her subsequent albums were Conversations at Dawn (Virgin Venture) and House of Dreams (China Records).

She has continued collaborating with Craig Leon on his projects, which since 1998 have been primarily in the classical field. Webb was also a production assistant to Leon on television projects such as the 2009 documentary Orbit: Journey to the Moon, which aired on the U.S. Discovery Channel, and Bell'aria which aired in 2010 on PBS. Webb was also a producer and creator of the story concept for the 2012 PBS broadcast Quest Beyond the Stars.

She also co-produced the album George Martin: The Film Scores and Original Compositions, released in 2018 on Atlas Realisations/PIAS.

In 2024, a selection of "Works in Progress over the years" with Craig Leon entitled The Ghost That Walks Behind Me was issued digitally via the Bandcamp platform.

== Albums ==
- Cassell Webb - Llano - Virgin Venture
- Cassell Webb - Thief of Sadness - Virgin Venture
- Cassell Webb - Songs of a Stranger - Virgin Venture
- Cassell Webb - Conversation At Dawn - Virgin Venture
- Cassell Webb - House of Dreams - China
- The Children - Rebirth - Cinema/Atco
- Cassell Webb - The Ghost That Walks Behind Me - Bandcamp

== Production credits ==
With Craig Leon:

- Craig Leon- The Canon: The Anthology of Interplanetary Folk Music vol.2 – RVNG Intl.
- Craig Leon- Nommos/Visiting: The Anthology of Interplanetary Folk Music vol. 1 - RVNG Intl.
- Craig Leon- Nommos- Takoma
- Craig Leon- Visiting- Arbitor/Enigma
- Craig Leon- Klub Anima Sound Track-Psi
- Cassell Webb- Llano-Virgin Venture
- Cassell Webb- Thief of Sadness- Virgin Venture
- Cassell Webb- Songs of a Stranger- Virgin Venture
- Cassell Webb-Conversation At Dawn- Virgin Venture
- Cassell Webb- House of Dreams- China
- Mark Owen- Green Man –BMG
- Mark Owen- "Child" – single –BMG
- Mark Owen- "Clementine" – single- BMG
- Angel Corpus Christi-White Courtesy Phone- Almo
- Martin Phillipps and the Chills - Sunburnt—Flying Nun
- Cobalt 60 (Front 242)- Elemental CD-Edel
- The Fall- Code Selfish -Phonogram
- The Fall -Shiftwork -Phonogram
- The Fall -Extricate -Phonogram
- Doctor and the Medics - Laughing at The Pieces -IRS
- Doctor and the Medics – Spirit in the Sky -IRS
- Blondie- No Exit –BMG
- Blondie- "Maria" – BMG
- The Cesarians – Cesarians 1 – Imprint
- Steve Hogarth – Ice Cream Genius (1997) – Poison Apple
- Bell'aria-"Little Italy"- EMI
- The London Chamber Orchestra – Midwinter's Eve- Sony Classical
- Quest Beyond the Stars – Original Soundtrack- Atlas Realisations/Warner Music

== Bibliography ==
- Routledge (2007). International Who's Who in Popular Music, p. 299. Routledge Books, London. 2007 ISBN 1-85743-417-X
