= Mr. & Mrs. Smith (2005 film) =

Film by Doug Liman

- Theatrical release poster
- Directed by: Doug Liman
- Written by: Simon Kinberg
- Produced by: Arnon Milchan; Akiva Goldsman; Lucas Foster; Patrick Wachsberger; Eric McLeod
- Starring: Brad Pitt; Angelina Jolie; Adam Brody; Kerry Washington
- Cinematography: Bojan Bazelli
- Edited by: Michael Tronick
- Music by: John Powell
- Production companies: Regency Enterprises; New Regency; Weed Road Pictures
- Distributed by: 20th Century Fox (selected territories); Summit Entertainment (international)
- Release dates: June 7, 2005 (Westwood); June 10, 2005 (United States)
- Running time: 120 minutes
- Country: United States
- Language: English
- Budget: $110 million
- Box office: $487.3 million

Mr. & Mrs. Smith is a 2005 American action comedy film directed by Doug Liman and written by Simon Kinberg. The film stars Brad Pitt and Angelina Jolie as a bored upper middle class married couple, who are surprised to learn that they are assassins belonging to competing agencies, leading to them trying to kill each other in order to protect themselves. Incidentally, the filming marked the beginning of Pitt and Jolie's real-life romantic relationship, leading to marriage and children, from 2005 to 2016.

Mr. & Mrs. Smith was released in the United States by 20th Century Fox on June 10, 2005, and received mixed reviews from critics, who praised Pitt and Jolie's performances and chemistry but criticized the screenplay. Nevertheless, the film was a commercial success, grossing $487.3 million worldwide and becoming the seventh highest-grossing film of 2005. In 2024, a television series of the same name loosely inspired by the film premiered on Amazon Prime Video, starring Donald Glover and Maya Erskine as two strangers paired up as spies and posing as a married couple; producer Arnon Milchan is the only cast or crew member returning from the original film.

== Plot ==
John Smith, a construction executive, and his wife Jane, an IT recruiter, are at marriage counseling. They have been married for about five or six years, and their marriage is suffering from a lack of communication and acts of quiet aggression, such as Jane installing drapes that John said he disliked. They first met in Bogotá, Colombia, claiming to be together to avoid being questioned by Colombian authorities. The two had a whirlwind courtship and married.

In secret, John and Jane are skilled field operatives working for separate contract-killing firms and are each among the best in their field. They are adept at concealing their true profession from each other. The Smiths live in a large Colonial Revival house in the New York City suburbs, keeping up appearances by reluctantly socializing with their "conventionally" wealthy neighbors. Underneath their cover stories, John and Jane balance their boring marriage with their careers.

After they are each assigned to kill DIA prisoner Benjamin "The Tank" Danz in a prison transfer, they run into each other on the job and the hit is botched. Knowing that their spouse is a fellow assassin makes both John and Jane fear that their marriage was just a part of the cover story and that their spouse will try to kill them in order to prevent their secret from being exposed. Following a tense dinner, Jane sneaks off and drives away from their home. John pursues her in hopes of talking things out, but slips against a fence, causing him to accidentally fire a gunshot that nearly hits Jane, thus solidifying her fears. Jane works with her team and steals John's armory from their home. Jane tries to kill John but he escapes every time. After several escalating attempts on each other's lives, the Smiths' conflict ends in a massive shootout which nearly demolishes their house. During a protracted and evenly-matched fight, John and Jane pull guns aiming at each other, but mutually realize that they cannot bring themselves to kill each other. They lay their guns down and spend a passionate night together.

The renewed Smith partnership is threatened by their employers, who join forces to eliminate the couple. Eddie, John's best friend and co-worker, turns down a bounty of $400,000 for each of them. The Smiths are attacked by an army of assassins. Their pockmarked house is blown up and the Smiths steal their neighbor's minivan. They destroy their pursuing attackers' armored sedans, while bickering about their fighting styles and personal secrets they have discovered about each other. They meet with Eddie and decide to save their marriage. The Smiths kidnap Danz from his high-security prison to use as a bargaining chip.

Danz tells them that he is merely bait, an intern hired by each of their employers after they discovered the Smiths were married; his clients hoped the Smiths would kill each other. Discarding each of their contingency plans, the Smiths make a last stand together, fending off an assault inside a home decorating store by heavily armed operatives. In the aftermath, the Smiths meet their marriage counselor again and say that their marriage is thriving.

== Cast ==
- Brad Pitt as John Smith
- Angelina Jolie as Jane Smith
- Vince Vaughn as Eddie
- Adam Brody as Benjamin "the Tank" Danz
- Kerry Washington as Jasmine
- Keith David as Father
- Chris Weitz as Martin Coleman
- Rachael Huntley as Suzy Coleman
- Michelle Monaghan as Gwen
- Stephanie March as Julie
- Jennifer Morrison as Jade
- Perrey Reeves as Jessie
- William Fichtner as Dr. Wexler, the marriage counselor (uncredited)
- Angela Bassett as the voice of Mr. Smith's boss, Atlanta (uncredited)

== Production ==
=== Background and development ===
In July 2000, Summit Entertainment had purchased screenwriter Simon Kinberg's spec script Mr. and Mrs. Smith with Weed Road Pictures slated to produce. Kinberg had written and sold the screenplay while a grad student at Columbia University's film program.

Kinberg had the idea for the screenplay after listening to a couple of his friends who went to marriage therapy. He thought it "sounded kind of aggressive and mercenary. And I just thought it would make an interesting template for a relationship inside of an action film." He named True Lies and The Thin Man series as among the inspirations. Though he initially pitched the script as a blend of many popular film genres, he ultimately saw it as primarily a romantic comedy. The director, Doug Liman, and the producers shared this vision, and attempted to present the action film elements as background and the relationship struggles between the two leads as the foreground. Kinberg phrased the romantic drama in metaphorical terms by making the characters "mythical" action film archetypes whose marital spats play out on a grandiose scale, and acknowledged that the tone was difficult for a film to pull off, since if taken literally, some of the characters' actions (such as John slamming Jane into a mirror during the restaurant scene) would constitute spousal abuse.

=== Casting ===
Producers secured Brad Pitt and Nicole Kidman for the leads when Doug Liman received the script. However, Kidman dropped out due to scheduling conflicts with The Stepford Wives, leaving the film without a co-lead. This led to Pitt dropping from the film.

Aishwarya Rai was then approached to play Jane Smith but she refused as she was uncomfortable with on-screen kissing. Liman then considered Will Smith and Catherine Zeta-Jones as the leads. Liman also considered the pairing of Johnny Depp and Cate Blanchett. Gwen Stefani also auditioned for Jane Smith. Once Angelina Jolie was signed, Pitt was back in and the pair was set.

John Leguizamo was offered the role of Eddie, but he turned it down as he was going to get paid on scale, a decision he later regretted. Parker Posey auditioned for the role of Jasmine, which eventually went to Kerry Washington.

=== Filming ===
Filming began in January 2004, and concluded in May 2005. The scenes in the marriage counselor's office were all shot on the first day of filming, which the filmmakers thought worked exceptionally well because the usual awkwardness of the first day of filming, in conjunction with Pitt and Jolie's awkwardness at working together for the first time, came across as authentic discomfort between their characters.

The producers wanted to have the Bogotá scenes filmed in Guanajuato, Mexico, but due to budget limitations they decided to settle for shooting it in downtown Los Angeles.

The dinner scene in which John and Jane Smith see each other with the knowledge that they are both assassins for the first time was described by both Kinberg and Liman as the scene which best encapsulated what they were trying to accomplish with the film. The scene was shot with John spitting out the meat into a napkin, but afterwards Liman was suddenly inspired to reshoot with John swallowing the meat, a decision Kinberg agreed with. In the subsequent chase scene, John was scripted to run into the picket fence, which was rigged to break on impact, but during the take that was ultimately used Pitt accidentally slipped and fell onto the fence instead.

John Smith's escape from the elevator was described as on-screen in the script, and was extensively worked out, but ultimately not filmed due to budget limitations.

The script called for Jane Smith to seduce Benjamin "The Tank" Danz in order to get the information the Smiths wanted, causing a bitter argument between John and Jane, but Jolie objected to doing this scene, perceiving it as a female spy stereotype. Liman said he thought Kinberg's script for the scene was terrific, but ultimately agreed to having it rewritten so Jane would bludgeon Danz instead in order to appease Jolie's concerns.

Liman decided to take a lesson from how most of the scenes he shot with the villains of The Bourne Identity ended up being cut from the film, and keep the villain screentime to a minimum with Mr. & Mrs. Smith. However, roughly two-thirds of the way through filming the producers reviewed the footage and concluded that there was no need for the film to have villains at all, since they only distracted from the central romantic conflict between the Smiths, and cut all the scenes in which the villains appeared. Liman also felt that having villains who the Smiths defeat sent the wrong message, implying that the Smiths' problems are completely resolved, and preferred the film to end with the message that marriage is an ongoing struggle.

== Music ==
Two soundtrack albums were released from the film: a soundtrack album by various artists and a film score composed by John Powell. The albums were released at different times to avoid confusion; the soundtrack was released on June 7, 2005, and the score on June 28, 2005.

=== Mr. & Mrs. Smith: Original Motion Picture Soundtrack ===
Mr. & Mrs. Smith Original Motion Picture Soundtrack

Soundtrack album by Various artists
- Released: June 7, 2005
- Genres: pop; pop rock; glam metal; new wave; R&B; alternative rock; film score; ska punk
- Length: 65:48 (U.S.)
- Labels: Lakeshore Records (U.S.); Gut Records (UK); Edel Records (EU)

Professional ratings
Review scores
Source	Rating
AllMusic	3.5/5 stars

Original Soundtrack (American release)
No.	Title	Writer(s)	Artist(s)	Length
1.	"Love Stinks"	Peter Wolf; Seth Justman	The J. Geils Band	3:37
2.	"Nothin' but a Good Time"	Bobby Dall; C.C. DeVille; Bret Michaels; Rikki Rockett	Poison	3:45
3.	"Tainted Love"	Ed Cobb	Soft Cell	2:42
4.	"Baby, Baby"	Keith Thomas; Amy Grant	Alana D	3:15
5.	"Express Yourself" (Mocean Worker Remix)	Charles Wright	Charles Wright & the Watts 103rd Street Rhythm Band	4:32
6.	"Mondo Bongo"	Joe Strummer	Joe Strummer & The Mescaleros	6:13
7.	"Lay Lady Lay"	Bob Dylan	Magnet featuring Gemma Hayes	4:39
8.	"I Melt with You"	Robbie Grey; Gary McDowell; Richard Brown; Michael Conroy; Stephen Walker	Nouvelle Vague	4:03
9.	"Nobody Does It Better"	Marvin Hamlisch; Carole Bayer Sager	8mm	4:57
10.	"Let's Never Stop Falling in Love"	China Forbes; Thomas Lauderdale	Pink Martini	3:01
11.	"Assassin's Tango"	John Powell	John Powell	4:02
12.	"Used to Love Her (But I Had to Kill Her)"	Guns N' Roses	Voodoo Glow Skulls	2:37
13.	"You Are My Sunshine"	Doug Spivey; Marv Taylor	Stine J.	2:22
14.	"You've Lost That Lovin' Feelin'"	Phil Spector; Barry Mann; Cynthia Weil	The Righteous Brothers	3:42
15.	"Making Love Out of Nothing at All"	Jim Steinman	Air Supply	5:42
16.	"You Give Love a Bad Name"	Jon Bon Jovi; Richie Sambora; Desmond Child	Atreyu	3:18
17.	"Love Will Keep Us Together"	Neil Sedaka; Howard Greenfield	Captain & Tennille	3:22
Total length:				65:48

Original Soundtrack (International release)
No.	Title	Writer(s)	Artist(s)	Length
1.	"Love Stinks"	Wolf; Justman	The J. Geils Band	3:37
2.	"Nothin' but a Good Time"	Dall; DeVille; Michaels; Rockett	Poison	3:45
3.	"Tainted Love"	Cobb	Soft Cell	2:42
4.	"Baby, Baby"	Thomas; Grant	Alana D	3:15
5.	"Express Yourself" (Mocean Worker Remix)	Wright	Charles Wright & the Watts 103rd Street Rhythm Band	4:32
6.	"Mondo Bongo"	Strummer	Joe Strummer & The Mescaleros	6:13
7.	"Lay Lady Lay"	Dylan	Magnet featuring Gemma Hayes	4:39
8.	"I Melt with You"	Grey; McDowell; Brown; Conroy; Walker	Nouvelle Vague	4:03
9.	"Nobody Does It Better"	Hamlisch; Sager	8mm	4:57
10.	"If I Neva See You Again"	Anderson D. Johnson; Aulsondro "Novelist" Hamilton	KansasCali	4:11
11.	"Assassin's Tango"	Powell	John Powell	4:02
12.	"Used to Love Her (But I Had to Kill Her)"	Guns N' Roses	Voodoo Glow Skulls	2:37
13.	"You Are My Sunshine"	Spivey; Taylor	Stine J.	2:22
14.	"You've Lost That Lovin' Feelin'"	Spector; Mann; Weil	The Righteous Brothers	3:42
15.	"Making Love Out of Nothing at All"	Steinman	Air Supply	5:42
16.	"You Give Love a Bad Name"	J. Bon Jovi; Sambora; Child	Atreyu	3:18
17.	"Love Will Keep Us Together"	Sedaka; Greenfield	Captain & Tennille	3:22

UK bonus track
No.	Title	Writer(s)	Artist(s)	Length
18.	"Stop Crying Your Heart Out"	Noel Gallagher	Rowetta	3:40
Total length:				70:40

Germany bonus track
No.	Title	Writer(s)	Artist(s)	Length
18.	"Believe in the Boogie"	Mark Owen; Paul Freeman; Adam Falkner	Mark Owen	3:31
Total length:				70:31

France bonus track
No.	Title	Writer(s)	Artist(s)	Length
18.	"Liquefy"	Dan Black	The Servant	3:40
Total length:				70:40

=== Mr. & Mrs. Smith: Original Motion Picture Score ===
Mr. & Mrs. Smith: Original Motion Picture Score

Film score by John Powell
- Released: June 28, 2005
- Genre: Film score
- Length: 43:53
- Label: Lakeshore Records
- Producer: John Powell

John Powell chronology
Robots (2005)	Mr. & Mrs. Smith: Original Motion Picture Score (2005)	Ice Age: The Meltdown (2006)

All music is composed by John Powell.

Original Score
No.	Title	Length
1.	"Bogota"	1:36
2.	"The Bedroom"	1:09
3.	"Playing House"	1:34
4.	"Assignments"	1:11
5.	"His and Her Hits"	2:44
6.	"Office Work"	2:08
7.	"Desert Foxes"	2:36
8.	"John and Jane's Identity"	2:00
9.	"Dinner"	4:13
10.	"Hood Jump"	1:44
11.	"Mutual Thoughts"	1:01
12.	"John Drops In"	2:29
13.	"Tango de Los Asesinos"	4:26
14.	"Two Phone Calls"	1:51
15.	"Kiss and Make Up"	1:52
16.	"Minivan Chase"	2:12
17.	"Shopping Spree"	4:19
18.	"Dodging Bullets"	1:20
19.	"The Next Adventure"	3:28
Total length:		43:53

== Reception ==
=== Box office ===
Mr. & Mrs. Smith opened on June 10, 2005, in the United States and Canada in 3,424 theaters. The film ranked at the top in its opening weekend, accumulating $50,342,878. Mr. & Mrs. Smith went on to gross $186,336,279 in North America and had a worldwide total of $478,207,520. It was the highest-grossing film for both superstars Brad Pitt and Angelina Jolie, but was later surpassed by World War Z for Pitt and Maleficent for Jolie.

=== Critical response ===
Review aggregation website Rotten Tomatoes gave Mr. & Mrs. Smith an approval rating of 60% based on 212 reviews, with an average score of 6.10/10. The site's critics consensus reads, "Although this action-romance suffers from weak writing and one too many explosions, the chemistry generated by onscreen couple Pitt and Jolie is palpable enough to make this a thoroughly enjoyable summer action flick." At Metacritic, which assigns a normalized rating out to reviews from mainstream critics, the film has received a rating average of 55 out of 100, based on 41 critics, which indicated "mixed or average reviews". Audiences surveyed by CinemaScore gave the film an average grade of "B+" on an A+ to F scale.

Simon Braund of Empire gave the film a positive review, describing it as "a full-on action flick, subversive rom-com and weapons-grade star vehicle that's drenched in Tinseltown glitz, from a director who knows how to put the money on the screen while his tongue's firmly in his cheek". Daniel Saney of Digital Spy gave 4/5 stars, saying "Its ideas are often borrowed, and it's hardly deep and meaningful, but it's a fantastically fun film". Roger Ebert of the Chicago Sun-Times gave 3/4 stars and praised the chemistry between the lead actors, saying "What makes the movie work is that Pitt and Jolie have fun together on the screen and they're able to find a rhythm that allows them to be understated and amused even during the most alarming developments". In a negative review, Mick LaSalle of San Francisco Chronicle described the film as "awful" and stated that "The tiny smidgen of cleverness on display here is contained entirely in the premise. The follow-through is nonexistent".

In 2025, The Hollywood Reporter listed Mr. & Mrs. Smith as having the best stunts of 2005.

== Controversies ==
=== Plagiarism accusations ===
In 2006, New Zealand author Gavin Bishop accused the makers of the movie of plagiarizing his 1997 school book, "The Secret Lives of Mr. and Mrs. Smith", which features a husband and wife living apparently dull suburban lives, but unbeknownst to each other, both work as spies. Bishop stated that he could not afford to sue, but would be happy to if a law firm would take up his case.

=== Inaccurate depiction of Bogotá ===
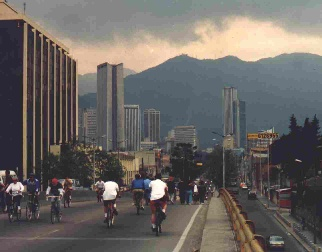
An accurate image of Bogotá in 1999

The government of Colombia criticized the film in particular for showing the capital Bogotá as a small village in the middle of the jungle with a hot and humid climate. President Alvaro Uribe Vélez and Mayor Luis Eduardo Garzón invited Angelina Jolie, Brad Pitt, and the producers to get to know the city and realize the mistakes they made.

== Home media ==
A single-disc DVD of the film was released on November 29, 2005, and a two-disc unrated version of the film was released on DVD on June 6, 2006. During director Doug Liman's audio commentary which is on the single-disc DVD release, he says that the film was edited for sexual and violent content to get a PG-13 rating. Mr. & Mrs. Smith was released on Blu-ray on December 4, 2007. It includes extra material from the 2005 single-disc DVD release but does not include additional material from the 2006 two-disc unrated version.

== Franchise ==
=== Failed TV pilot ===
In 2007, a pilot for a spin-off television series was made for the network ABC. Set six months after the end of the film, it was written by Simon Kinberg and directed by Doug Liman. Kinberg described the proposed television series as "Married... with Children with guns." The roles of John and Jane were played by Martin Henderson and Jordana Brewster. On website The Futon Critic, Brian Ford Sullivan criticized the chemistry between Henderson and Brewster and ended his review stating, "While there's always a few gems that get locked away in the networks' vaults each year, this decidedly isn't one of them". ABC decided not to commission the series.

=== Cancelled sequel ===
In June 2010, Jolie said that she and Pitt had inquired about a sequel to the film but were dissatisfied with the story. Jolie remarked, "We did ask somebody to look into Mr. & Mrs. to see if they could crack a sequel, but there wasn't anything original. It was just, 'Well, they're going to get married, or they've got kids, or they get separated.' Never great."

=== Television series ===
In February 2021, Amazon Studios announced that a anthology television series based on the original film, starring Donald Glover and Phoebe Waller-Bridge, was set to be released on Amazon Prime Video in 2022. Due to creative differences Waller-Bridge exited the project in early September 2021 and in April 2022, it was reported that Maya Erskine had replaced her in the main role.

On February 2, 2024, the TV series was released on Amazon Prime Video to critical acclaim.

== See also ==
- XXX: State of the Union
- Keeping Up with the Joneses (film)
- Spy × Family
- "Mr. & Mrs. Simpson" is as Treehouse of Horror segment from The Simpsons nineteeth season. the segment sees two then realize they are more attracted with one another when they kil someone together.
