= How the mighty fall =

How the mighty fall may refer to:

- James C. Collins book, How the Mighty Fall: And Why Some Companies Never Give In
- How the Mighty Fall, a Mark Owen album
