= Alone Without You =

Single by Mark Owen

from the album In Your Own Time
- B-side: "Killing Time"; "What We Already Know"
- Released: 27 October 2003
- Recorded: 2002–2003
- Genre: Pop
- Length: 3:57 [Album Version] 3:46 [Radio Edit]
- Label: Island
- Songwriter: Mark Owen
- Producer: Gary Clark

Mark Owen singles chronology
"Four Minute Warning" (2003)	"Alone Without You" (2003)	"Makin' Out" (2004)

"Alone Without You" is the second and final single released from Take That band member Mark Owen's second solo studio album, In Your Own Time. The single was released on 27 October 2003. The single peaked at #26 on the UK Singles Chart. The song was originally called "For You". Following poor sales of both the album and single, Owen was dropped from Island Records in 2004. He later went on to record further material on his own independent label.

== Music video ==
The music video was directed by Phil Griffin and runs on a total length of 3 minutes and 40 seconds. It stars Mark Owen turning on a camera in a white room, later on showing a lot more versions of Mark Owen joining in, switching places with Mark sitting on a chair and sing. One version of Mark Owen would paint on the wall with the words "What am I to say? What am I to do?" (the first two verses of the chorus), while another would sing on the telephone. The woman in the red dress appears in the video and is played by British choreographer and model Keeley Malone.

== Track listing ==
Promotional Single

1. "Alone Without You" [Shanghai Surprise Mix] – 8:30
2. "Alone Without You" [Radio Edit] – 3:43

UK CD single #1

1. "Alone Without You" [Radio Edit] – 3:43
2. "Killing Time" – 3:11
3. "Four Minute Warning" [Acoustic] – 4:06
4. "Alone Without You" [Video] – 3:53

UK CD single #2

1. "Alone Without You" [Album Version] – 3:57
2. "What We Already Know" – 4:03
3. "Alone Without You" [Acoustic] – 3:51

== Chart performance ==
Chart (2003)	Peak Position
Europe (European Hot 100)	85
Scotland Singles (OCC)	22
UK Singles (OCC)	26
