= In Your Own Time =

Studio album by Mark Owen
- Released: 3 November 2003
- Recorded: 2002–2003
- Studio: Area 21 and Crashpad (London, England); True North Studios (Cheshire, England)
- Genre: Rock; pop rock
- Length: 48:31
- Label: Island
- Producer: Henry Priestman, True North, Steve Robson, Gary Clark, Peter-John Vettese, Ali Thomson, Dave James, Espionage

Mark Owen chronology
Green Man (1996)	In Your Own Time (2003)	How the Mighty Fall (2005)

Singles from In Your Own Time
- 1. "Four Minute Warning" Released: 4 August 2003; 2. "Alone Without You" Released: 27 October 2003

In Your Own Time is the second solo studio album by British singer Mark Owen. The album was released on 3 November 2003, by Island Records. In Your Own Time features a more mature pop rock sound, shifting away from the Britpop sound of his debut album.

== Critical reception ==
Professional ratings
Review scores
Source	Rating
AllMusic	3/5 stars
MusicOMH	(positive)

The album received mixed to positive reviews. A reviewer from MusicOMH favorably compared the album to the work of folk rock musician Jeff Buckley, saying that Owen had been "clearly listening" to his music, and that listeners would realise this if they would remove their preconceptions about Owen.

== Commercial performance ==
The album failed to match the success of his debut album, where it did not chart anywhere outside of the United Kingdom. The album peaked at number 59 on the UK Albums Chart, and stayed in the charts for only one week, with sales of 17,805 copies sold in the UK. In Scotland, the album charted at number 46.

== Singles ==
- "Four Minute Warning" was released as the album's lead single on 4 August 2003. The song was written by Owen and Eliot Kennedy and produced by Henry Priestman. The song peaked at number 4 on the UK Singles Chart, making it his third UK top-ten single, with sales of over 80,000 copies sold in the United Kingdom. The song also reached number 37 in Ireland and number 52 in the Netherlands. Owen performed the song live on several shows, including Top of the Pops, CD:UK and The Graham Norton Show.
- "Alone Without You" was released as the album's second single on 27 October 2003. The song charted at number 26 on the UK Singles Chart. Owen performed the song live on Top of the Pops and Today with Des and Mel.

== Track listing ==
No.	Title	Writer(s)	Producer(s)	Length
1.	"Four Minute Warning"	Mark Owen, Eliot Kennedy	Henry Priestman, True North	4:05
2.	"Gravity"	Owen, John McLaughlin, Steve Robson	Steve Robson	3:21
3.	"Alone Without You"	Owen	Gary Clark	3:57
4.	"Head in the Clouds"	Owen, Robert Harris	Robson	3:23
5.	"Kill with Your Smile"	Owen, Gary Clark	Clark	4:49
6.	"Close to the Edge"	Owen, Guy Batson, Henry Priestman	Peter-John Vettese	4:18
7.	"How Do You Love"	Owen, Ali Thomson	Ali Thomson	3:44
8.	"Pieces of Heaven"	Owen, Peter-John Vettese	Vettese	3:11
9.	"Turn the Light On"	Owen, Gary Barlow, Kennedy	True North	3:13
10.	"Crush"	Owen, Harris	Robson	3:23
11.	"Baby I'm No Good"	Owen, Espen Lind, Amund Bjørklund	Espionage	3:15
12.	"If You Weren't Leaving Me"	Owen, Barlow, Kennedy, Tim Woodcock	True North	3:17
13.	"My Life"	Owen, McLaughlin, Dan Goudie, Ian McCulloch	Dave James, John McLaughlin	4:23
Total length:				48:31

== Personnel ==
- Jon Marius Aareskjold – engineer, mixing
- Robbie Adams – engineer, mixing
- Gary Barlow – composer, Instrumentation, Keyboards
- Andy Caine – Background vocals
- Ryan Carline – assistant
- Alison Clark – Background vocals
- Gary Clark – drum programming, engineer, guitar (acoustic), guitar (Bass), guitar (Electric), Harmonica, Instrumentation, Mixing, Producer, Synthesizer Programming, Tambourine, Background vocals
- Thymann Dansk – Photography
- Hugo Degenhardt – drums
- Geoff Dugmore – drums
- Richard Edgeler – assistant
- James Eller – bass
- Tom Elmhirst – mixing
- Mark Tufty Evans – engineer, guitar, Mixing, Programming
- Mark Feltham – Harmonica
- Ben Georgiades – engineer
- Pete Gleadall – mixing
- Ricky Graham – engineer
- Simon Hale – String arrangements
- Robert Harris – composer
- Dave James – engineer, producer
- Eliot Kennedy – composer, guitar, Instrumentation
- The London Session Orchestra – Orchestra
- Ian McCulloch – composer, guitar
- Robbie McKintosh – guitar
- John McLaughlin – composer, producer
- Yoad Nevo – programming
- Matthew Ollivier – engineer
- Mark Owen – composer, guitar (Electric), Vocals, Background vocals
- Henry Priestman – composer, producer
- Steve Robson – bass, composer, guitar, Keyboards, Mixing, Producer
- Jonn Savannah – guitar (Electric), Synthesizer, Background vocals
- Rohan Thomas – keyboards
- Ali Thomson – composer, engineer, keyboards, mixing, producer, programming, Background vocals
- Keith Uddin – assistant
- Peter-John Vettese – composer, drums, guitar, Keyboards, Producer, Programming, String arrangements
- Jeremy Wheatley – mixing, programming
- Tim Woodcock – composer
- Gavyn Wright – Orchestra Leader

== Chart performance ==
Chart (2003)	Peak position
Scottish Albums (OCC)	46
UK Albums (OCC)	59
