= Andy Pawlak =

British singer, musician and songwriter

- Born: Andrew R. Pawlak; 1964; Tynemouth, Northumberland
- Occupations: Singer, musician, songwriter
- Instruments: Vocals, guitar
- Years active: 1980s–present
- Labels: Phonogram

Andy Pawlak is an English singer, musician and songwriter, born in Tynemouth, Northumberland, in 1964. He signed a record deal with Phonogram in 1988 and released the album Shoebox Full of Secrets in 1989. After a period as a flight instructor, he resumed his music career in the 1990s as an independent artist.

== Background ==
In his early musical career, Pawlak performed as a solo act across Britain's live circuit, including as a support act for Wet Wet Wet, the Blow Monkeys and the Pogues. In 1988, he signed to Phonogram and formed a backing band to expand his sound, with Graham Henderson on keyboards, Nick Bagnall on bass and Paul Hudson on drums. Pawlak recorded his debut album Shoebox Full of Secrets that year with Craig Leon as producer. A song recorded for the album, "Love Letters", originally gained attention after it was used on The Tube during a feature on the photographer Jimmy Forsyth.

Pawlak's debut single "Mermaids" was released by Fontana on 10 October 1988 and was followed by "Secrets" on 9 January 1989. Shoebox Full of Secrets was released on 6 March 1989. The album gained positive critical reception in the UK music press, but failed to achieve commercial success. A third and final single, "She Kept a Hold of Love (Mother's Day)", was released on 30 May 1989. Pawlak was the support act for Bonnie Raitt at her London concert on 12 April 1989. He then joined Irish band Clannad as the special guest on their month-long British tour from 24 April.

After Shoebox Full of Secrets, Pawlak began recording his second studio album for Phonogram, but the label did not like the material. The album was never completed and Pawlak destroyed the demo recordings. Pawlak then moved to San Francisco and became a flight instructor. He returned to London later in the 1990s to resume his music career. He finished writing material for a new album and formed a band called Monkey, with Scott Donaldson on guitar, Richard Nolan on bass and Jasper Irn on drums. The band signed with Island to record the album Low Beat Folk, but the album was shelved. Pawlak attempted to retrieve the rights for the album, but Universal would not allow the recordings to be released.

In July 2008, Tales from the Monkeyshed was released on digital platforms under the name Subdeluxe. As a collaboration between Pawlak and Donaldson, the release contains re-recordings of tracks originally intended for Pawlak's unfinished second album. In 2016, Pawlak released In the Kitchen, a collection of demos he recorded in 1985, alongside another mini-album, Blood and Feathers, which contains miscellaneous demo recordings. In 2017, he released Low Beat Folk under his own name and later that year saw the release of a new album, Sasquatches and Synthesizers. This was followed by One Word of Truth Outweighs the World in 2019, along with the compilation Lost Demos 1985-1986. The single "Subside" was released in 2020 under the Subdeluxe name. The song was originally recorded by Monkey and was included on the soundtrack of the 1997 British crime drama film Face.

== Discography ==
=== Albums ===
- 1989: Shoebox Full of Secrets
- 2008: Tales from the Monkeyshed (as Subdeluxe)
- 2016: In the Kitchen (mini-album)
- 2016: Blood and Feathers (mini-album)
- 2017: Low Beat Folk
- 2017: Sasquatches and Synthesizers
- 2019: One Word of Truth Outweighs the World
- 2019: Lost Demos 1985-1986

=== Singles ===
- "Mermaids" (1988)
- "Secrets" (1988) (AUS #141)
- "She Kept a Hold of Love (Mother's Day)" (1989)
- "Subside" (2020) (as Subdeluxe)
