= Shoebox Full of Secrets =

Studio album by Andy Pawlak
- Released: 6 March 1989
- Genre: Sophisti-pop
- Length: 41:46 (LP, cassette); 49:13 (CD)
- Label: Fontana
- Producer: Craig Leon; Andy Pawlak; Graham Henderson

Andy Pawlak chronology
Shoebox Full of Secrets (1989)	In the Kitchen (2016)

Shoebox Full of Secrets is the debut studio album by English singer-songwriter Andy Pawlak, which was released by Fontana in 1989.

== Background ==
After performing across Britain's live circuit as a solo act, Pawlak signed to Phonogram's Fontana Records in 1988. He began recording his debut album Shoebox Full of Secrets that year, with Craig Leon as producer, and primarily backed by Graham Henderson on keyboards, Graham Edwards on bass and Paul Hudson on drums.

Pawlak's debut single "Mermaids" was released by on 10 October 1988 and was followed by "Secrets" in January 1989. Shoebox Full of Secrets was released on 6 March 1989, and a third and final single, "She Kept a Hold of Love (Mother's Day)", was released on 30 May 1989. The singles and album gained positive critical reception in the UK music press, but failed to achieve commercial success. "Secrets" peaked at number 141 in Australia's ARIA Chart in June 1989.

== Critical reception ==
Professional ratings
Review scores
Source	Rating
New Musical Express	7/10
Record Mirror	4.5/5 stars
Sounds	1/5 stars

On its release, David Giles of Record Mirror considered Pawlak to sound like the Style Council, as well as Paddy McAloon of Prefab Sprout and Roddy Frame of Aztec Camera. He commented, "While the LP is laughably derivative, you can't help but warm to a record so lovingly constructed. Pawlak may have swiped right, left and centre, but at least he's swiped from all the right sources." Giles praised Pawlak's lyrics as "very good indeed" and added that "they are not let down by the melodies". He wrote, "Pawlak proves he is capable of writing songs that sound irritatingly familiar on first listen but soon blossom into something great." Hi-Fi News & Record Review wrote, "Observant, articulate and not too precious, Pawlak makes music that warrants the tag 'fresh' without implying 'twee'. The melodies are distinctive [and] the feel is comfortable." The reviewer also drew comparisons between Pawlak and Black.

Len Brown of New Musical Express described Pawlak as an "old-fashioned songwriter with a fine ear for pop tunes" with "confessional songs dragged from the hidey-hole beneath his bed; nick-nacks of lyrics from his scrapbook mind, tingling memories of adolescent romances." Brown added, "He knows not to overburden every track with hooklines [and] knows how to leave the audience wanting to hear more. So that these are tinderbox long songs - sometimes a touch too sweet – isn't really a problem, because he varies the pace and emotional demands of each." John Morgan of the Derby Evening Telegraph commented, "In a similar vein to Prefab Sprout, Pawlak's interesting and quirky lyrics are sensitively handled musically, and he could be on the way to success in the same market as Aztec Camera." Sam King of Sounds was critical of the album, writing, "Pawlak might see himself as just another Newcastle poet out on the road yet, for all his Tyneside chic, he is the definitive yuppie artist. His tawdry vignettes display the quality of a third division Haircut 100, emotional vacancy masquerading as experience – the musical equivalent of grey formica."

== Track listing ==
All tracks are written by Andy Pawlak.

LP and cassette release
No.	Title	Length
1.	"Secrets"	4:24
2.	"You and Me"	4:21
3.	"Mermaids"	3:42
4.	"Best Regards"	3:44
5.	"Forever"	3:09
6.	"Mother's Day"	3:15
7.	"All That's Left of Me"	4:25
8.	"Eskimo Kissing"	3:21
9.	"Love Letters"	3:32
10.	"For Better or Worse"	3:30
11.	"White Eagles"	4:17

CD release bonus tracks
No.	Title	Length
12.	"No Compromise"	3:55
13.	"Wintertime"	3:31

== Personnel ==
- Andy Pawlak – guitar (tracks 1–10), vocals (tracks 1–11)
- Graham Henderson – piano (tracks 1–3, 5–11), synths (tracks 1–3, 5–8), organ (tracks 6, 10)
- Graham Edwards – bass (tracks 1–3, 5–8)
- Paul Hudson – drums (tracks 1–3, 5–8, 10)
- Luis Jardim – additional drums and percussion (tracks 1–3, 5–8), percussion (track 4)
- Dee Lewis, Shirley Lewis – backing vocals (tracks 1–3, 6–8)
- Craig Leon – string arrangement (tracks 1, 3–8, 11), brass arrangement (tracks 1, 6)
- Vince Sullivan – saxophone (track 3)
- Pete Stuart – double bass (tracks 4, 9–10)
- Guy Barker – trumpet solo (track 10)
- Jimmy Helms, George Chambers, Jimmie Chambers – backing vocals (track 10)

Production

- Craig Leon – producer (tracks 1–11)
- Andy Pawlak, Graham Henderson – producers (tracks 12–13)
- Dick Beetham – engineer (tracks 1, 3–5, 7–13)
- Arabella Rodriguez – engineer (tracks 2, 6)
- Jack Adams – mastering

Other

- Joseph McKenzie – front cover photography
- Derek Ridgers – inner sleeve photography
- Mark Whitehouse at the Design Clinic – layout
