= X-Men: The Last Stand (soundtrack) =

X-Men: The Last Stand – Original Motion Picture Soundtrack

Film score by John Powell
- Released: May 23, 2006
- Genre: Soundtrack
- Length: 61:27
- Labels: Varèse Sarabande; Fox Music
- Producer: John Powell

John Powell chronology
Ice Age: The Meltdown (2006)	X-Men: The Last Stand – Original Motion Picture Soundtrack (2006)	Happy Feet (2006)

X-Men: The Last Stand – Original Motion Picture Soundtrack was composed by John Powell. It was released on May 23, 2006 by Varèse Sarabande and Fox Music. X-Men: The Last Stand was the third film in the series, and Powell was the third composer used following Michael Kamen and John Ottman.

X-Men: The Last Stand – Original Motion Picture Soundtrack has received generally positive reviews from critics.

== Style ==
The film's director Brett Ratner invited John Powell to write the music for being a fan of Powell's work in The Bourne Identity. Powell included references to the score from the previous two films - "it all had to be in the same family, and the same language" - and used lyrics from Benjamin Britten's Requiem Mass for the choir parts.

Powell deviated from the first two in that he created less a set of individual cues and more of a cohesive sound throughout. Most of the 27 tracks are short, with the exception of a few extended battle sequence cues. The second track "Bathroom Titles" is an explosion of violent percussion in the form of Danny Elfman's Planet of the Apes soundtrack. Actually, Powell's style is a noticeable mixture of Elfman and John Williams (especially their Spider-Man and Superman soundtracks, respectively).

== Orchestration ==
Powell had 141 musicians of the Hollywood Studio Symphony at his disposal, and he did not waste them. Despite drawing similarities to other composers (like Danny Elfman and John Williams), soundtrack reviewer and talk show host Clark Douglas stated that Powell diverted from "recent action scores which force the orchestra to play second string to the synthetic elements (such as Klaus Badelt's "Poseidon")... [and instead] fully utilizes the elements at his disposal." Douglas went on to say that the orchestra is best used during the "final third" of the score.

== Track listing ==
All music is composed by John Powell.

No.	Title	Length
1.	"20 Years Ago"	1:10
2.	"Bathroom Titles"	1:09
3.	"The Church of Magneto/Raven Is My Slave Name"	2:40
4.	"Meet Leech, Then Off To the Lake"	2:37
5.	"Whirlpool of Love"	2:04
6.	"Examining Jean"	1:12
7.	"Dark Phoenix"	1:28
8.	"Angel's Cure"	2:34
9.	"Jean and Logan"	1:39
10.	"Dark Phoenix Awakes"	1:45
11.	"Rejection Is Never Easy"	1:09
12.	"Magneto Plots"	2:05
13.	"Entering the House"	1:18
14.	"Dark Phoenix's Tragedy"	3:18
15.	"Farewell to X"	0:30
16.	"The Funeral"	2:52
17.	"Skating On the Pond"	1:12
18.	"Cure Wars"	2:57
19.	"Fight in the Woods"	3:06
20.	"St Lupus Day"	3:03
21.	"Building Bridges"	1:16
22.	"Shock and No Oars"	1:15
23.	"Attack on Alcatraz"	4:36
24.	"Massacre"	0:31
25.	"The Battle of the Cure"	4:20
26.	"Phoenix Rises"	4:21
27.	"The Last Stand"	5:29
Total length:		61:27

- On the CD version of the album, the track "Phoenix Rises" is incorrectly labeled on the back and inside the booklet as having a length of 6:29 when, in fact, it is only 4:21.

== Reception ==
Professional ratings
Review scores
Source	Rating
Allmusic	3.5/5 stars
ScoreNotes	8/10 stars
Tracksounds	8/10 stars
Scorereviews.com	4/5 stars
Filmtracks	4/5 stars
Soundtrack.Net	4/5 stars

Sean Wilson of Den of Geek said Powell's soundtrack is less thoughtful than Michael Kamen’s X-Men score but more memorable and richly realized than John Ottman’s. They found it a shame that Powell’s old-school score was used in one of the franchise’s weaker films, noting that it combines action and emotion with multiple themes. Wilson also noted that this soundtrack solidifies Powell as one of modern film's great score composers and wishes the more recent X-Men movies had his input.

== Charts ==
Chart performance for X-Men: The Last Stand – Original Motion Picture Soundtrack
Chart (2006)	Peak position
UK Soundtrack Albums (OCC)	12
US Top Soundtracks (Billboard)	14

== Accolades ==
Award	Category	Nominee(s)	Result	Ref(s)
Saturn Award	Best Music	John Powell	Nominated	
