= Ice Age: The Meltdown (soundtrack) =

Ice Age: The Meltdown (Original Motion Picture Soundtrack)

Film score by John Powell
- Released: March 28, 2006
- Recorded: 2005
- Studios: Newman Scoring Stage, 20th Century Fox Studios, Los Angeles
- Genre: Film score
- Length: 62:48
- Labels: Varèse Sarabande; Fox Music
- Producer: John Powell

John Powell chronology
| Mr. & Mrs. Smith (2005) | Ice Age: The Meltdown (2006) | X-Men: The Last Stand (2006) |

Ice Age: The Meltdown (Original Motion Picture Soundtrack) is the film score to the 2006 film Ice Age: The Meltdown, the second instalment in the Ice Age franchise and the sequel to Ice Age (2002). The film score is composed and orchestrated by John Powell, who replaced the predecessor's composer David Newman and released through Varèse Sarabande and Fox Music labels on March 28, 2006.

== Background ==
David Newman who composed music for Ice Age did not return for the sequel. Instead, the score for The Meltdown is composed by John Powell. Powell was recruited for the film after previously composing for Blue Sky Studios film Robots (2005), and Chris Wedge who liked his score wanted him to work on the sequel. Powell did not incorporate Newman's themes for the film and composed fresh themes.

== Reception ==
Christian Clemmensen of Filmtracks wrote "Powell does accomplish a score that takes a small step above the usual formulaic approach that would probably have sufficed for the genre, but still doesn't quite capture the kind of enticing style that helps Chicken Run retain its popularity." A reviewer based at AllMusic wrote "Powell's dynamic music perfectly reflects moments in the film, ranging from the lively opening track, "The Waterpark," to the tense "Attack from Below the Ice" to the serene "Into the Sunset." Mike Brennan of Soundtrack.Net wrote "This is not Powell's best score, but it is nice to see him return to the energetic animated films." Todd McCarthy of Variety and Jeannette Catsoulis of The New York Times found it to be "fascinating" and "compelling".

== Track listing ==
| No. | Title | Length |
|---|---|---|
| 1. | "The Waterpark" | 2:24 |
| 2. | "The Vulture of Doom" | 1:18 |
| 3. | "Migration" | 3:32 |
| 4. | "Call of the Mammoth" | 1:52 |
| 5. | "Sad Manny and The Possums" | 1:44 |
| 6. | "Manny and Ellie Meet" | 3:44 |
| 7. | "Traveling with Possums" | 2:00 |
| 8. | "12 Ton Mammoth & A 10 Ton Possum" | 1:55 |
| 9. | "Attack from Below the Ice" | 2:04 |
| 10. | "Extreme Possum" | 1:50 |
| 11. | "Who Will Join Me on the Dung Heap?" | 0:44 |
| 12. | "Log Moving" | 0:59 |
| 13. | "Ellie Remembers" | 2:41 |
| 14. | "Foggy Balance" | 3:43 |
| 15. | "Goodnight Sweet Possums" | 0:48 |
| 16. | "Kidnapped" | 0:56 |
| 17. | "Sid's Sing-along" | 2:08 |
| 18. | "Food Glorious Food" | 1:34 |
| 19. | "The Boat and the Geysers" | 2:40 |
| 20. | "The Dam Breaks" | 1:54 |
| 21. | "Ellie Gets Trapped" | 0:32 |
| 22. | "Manny to the Rescue" | 2:08 |
| 23. | "Rescues All Round" | 3:05 |
| 24. | "Scrat to the Rescue" | 1:28 |
| 25. | "The Water Recedes" | 1:52 |
| 26. | "Mammoths" | 1:24 |
| 27. | "With the Herd" | 0:25 |
| 28. | "Into the Sunset" | 3:00 |
| 29. | "The Pearly Gates (Note: incorporates "Adagio" from Spartacus)" | 1:32 |
| 30. | "CPR" | 0:14 |
| 31. | "Mini-Sloths Sing-a-Long" | 2:13 |
| 32. | "The Meltdown" | 4:25 |
| Total length: | | 62:48 |

== Personnel ==
Credits adapted from liner notes:

- Music composer and producer – John Powell
- Music programming and arrangements – John Powell, James McKee Smith, John Ashton Thomas
- Engineer – Bill Talbott
- Assistant engineer – Tom Hardisty
- Score recordist – Tim Lauber
- Digital recordist – Erik Swanson
- Recording – Shawn Murphy, Dan Lerner
- Mixing – Shawn Murphy
- Mastering – Patricia Sullivan-Fourstar
- Score editor – David Channing
- Music editor – Tom Carlson
- Executive producer – Robert Townson
- Technical consultant – Koji Egawa
- Musical assistance – Germaine Franco
- Music coordinator – Rebecca Morellato
- Copyist – Joann Kane Music Services

Orchestra

- Performer – Hollywood Studio Symphony
- Orchestrators – Brad Dechter, Bruce Fowler, John Powell, John Ashton Thomas, Mark McKenzie, Randy Kerber
- Conductor – Pete Anthony
- Contractor – Debbi Datz-Pyle
- Stage manager – Jason Lloyd, Tom Steel
- Concertmaster – Bruce Dukov

Choir

- Contractor – Edie Lehmann Boddicker
- Vocals – Alvin Chea, Bob Joyce, Bobbi Page, Carmen Twillie, Clydene Jackson, Dan Navarro, Debbie Hall-Gleason, Dorian Holley, Edie Lehmann Boddicker, Elin Carlson, Emme Lehmann Boddicker, Jennifer Barnes, Jim Gilstrap, Jon Joyce, Karen Whipple, Monica L. Lee, Monique Donnelly, Oren Waters, Randy Crenshaw, Rick Logan, Sally Stevens, Sandie Hall, Teri Koide, Tim Dans, Eyvonne Williams

Instruments

- Bassoon – Dave Riddles, John Steinmetz, Ken Munday, Rose Corrigan
- Cello – Andrew Shulman, Tony Cooke, Cecilia Tsan, Tina Soule, Dane Little, Dennis Karmazyn, Erika Duke Kirkpatrick, Kim Scholes, Giovanna Clayton, Larry Corbett, Paul Cohen, Steve Erdody, Tim Landauer, Trevor Handy
- Clarinet – Gary Bovyer, Mike Grego, Ralph Williams
- Double bass – Ann Atkinson, Bruce Morgenthaler, Chris Kollgaard, Drew Dembowski, Ed Meares, Francis Lui Wu, Richard Feves, Sue Ranney
- Flute – Geri Rotella, Heather Clark, Jim Walker, Julie Long, Louise Ditullio
- French horn – Brad Warnaar, Brian O'Connor, Carol Drake, Dan Kelly, David Duke, Jim Thatcher, Joe Meyer, John Reynolds, Kristy Morrell, Kurt Snyder, Mark Adams (10), Nathan Campbell, Paul Klintworth, Phil Yao, Rick Todd, Ron Kaufman, Steve Becknell, Todd Miller
- Guitar – George Doering
- Harp – Ellie Choate, Gayle Levant, Katie Kirkpatrick, Marcia Dickstein
- Oboe – Leanne Becknell, Leslie Reed, Phil Ayling
- Percussion – Mike Fisher
- Piano and celeste – Randy Kerber
- Trombone – Alan Kaplan, Alex Iles, Bill Reichenbach, Bruce Otto, Charlie Loper, Craig Ware, Lori Stuntz, Phil Teele, Steve Holtman
- Trumpet – Dan Fornero, Harry Kim, John Fumo, Jon Lewis, Rick Baptist, Warren Luening, Wayne Bergeron
- Tuba – Doug Tornquist, Jim Self, John Van Houten
- Viola – Andrew Duckles, Brian Dembow, Darrin McCann, David Walther, Karen Van Sant, Keith Greene, Lynne Richburg, Matt Funes, Roland Kato, Shawn Mann, Simon Oswell, Thomas Diener, Vickie Miskolczy
- Violin – Alan Grunfeld, Alyssa Park, Ana Landauer, Arman Anassian, Claudia Parducci, Darius Campo, Eric Hosler, Eun Mee Ahn, Helen Nightingale, Irina Voloshina, Ishani Bhoola, Jennie Levin, Joel Derouin, Josefina Vergara, Julie Gigante, Katia Popov, Kevin Connolly, Liane Mautner, Lorenz Gamma, Marc Sazer, Marina Manukian, Natalie Leggett, Pat Johnson, Phil Levy, Richard Altenbach, Roberto Cani, Sara Parkins, Sarah Thornblade, Shalini Vijayan, Sid Page, Tereza Stanislav, Roger Wilkie
- Woodwind – Pedro Eustache

Management

- Music clearance for 20th Century Fox – Ellen Ginsburg
- Executive in charge of music for 20th Century Fox – Robert Kraft
- Music business and legal affairs for 20th Century Fox – Traci Dallas-Opdahl
- Music supervision for 20th Century Fox – Mike Knobloch

== Accolades ==
| Award | Category | Recipient | Result | Ref. |
|---|---|---|---|---|
| International Film Music Critics Association | Best Original Score for an Animated Film | John Powell | Nominated | |
| World Soundtrack Awards | Soundtrack Composer of the Year | John Powell | Nominated | |
