= Face (1997 film) =

- Face DVD cover
- Directed by: Antonia Bird
- Written by: Ronan Bennett
- Produced by: Elinor Day
- Starring: Robert Carlyle; Ray Winstone; Steven Waddington; Phil Davis; Lena Headey; Damon Albarn
- Cinematography: Fred Tammes
- Edited by: St. John O'Rorke
- Music by: Paul Conboy; Adrian Corker; Andy Roberts
- Production company: BBC Films
- Distributed by: United International Pictures
- Release date: 26 September 1997
- Running time: 105 minutes
- Country: United Kingdom
- Language: English

Face is a 1997 British crime drama directed by Antonia Bird and written by Ronan Bennett. It stars Robert Carlyle and Ray Winstone and features the acting debut of musical artist Damon Albarn.

== Plot ==
Five men, criminals Ray, Dave, Stevie, Julian ("Julie" as a nickname), and Jason, plan a robbery to steal a minimum of £2 million. Using a lorry modified as a battering ram, the group break into a security depot in London and steal a large amount of money before the police arrive.

Upon counting the loot however, they quickly discover, that despite it looking like a large sum of money, it is almost entirely made up of small notes and only around £340,000, meaning a share of £68,000 each.

Julian demands an extra sum for "expenses" for his work but is beaten and placed in the boot of Ray's car until he accepts his share. The group, without Julian, later spend time at a bar with Jason's uncle and fellow criminal Sonny, and Ray's girlfriend Connie, a protester. Ray and Stevie also visit an elderly couple, Linda and Bill, where they leave their stolen money for safekeeping.

The next day, Ray and Stevie, who live together with Connie, are alerted by a bruised Dave that his money was stolen, apparently by Julian. Ray, Dave, and Stevie investigate Linda and Bill's home to find them murdered and the money stolen, leaving Ray distraught. He visits Julian but his money is missing too. They conclude that Sonny stole the money and break into his house, only to find Jason dead with a head wound. The four are alerted to a pair of undercover police officers and flee, Dave and Julian exchanging fire with the police. Believing that he may be arrested for murder, Ray decides to flee after the money is found and goes to his mother and Connie for help. His mother gives him some money and her car to use, disappointed in her son's career but still caring for him. Ray then speaks with Connie and asks her to come with him and to meet her at a roadside service station on the M1 if she decides to come.

Ray visits the bar and learns from John the bartender that Dave left in a taxi with Jason and Sonny after the heist. Dave is beaten and interrogated by Ray, Stevie, and Julian, revealing he was being blackmailed by his daughter's boyfriend Chris, a corrupt police officer, to gain him the money to protect his daughter from harm. Dave also murdered Linda, Bill, Jason, and Sonny. The group attacks Chris in his apartment and he is forced to reveal that the money is in a locker room at a local police station. Dave is taken upstairs by the rest of the gang whereupon he sees a tray of prepared cocaine, enraging Dave to the point that he chokes Chris to death. Stevie and Julian remove Sarah and Ray shoots Dave for his treachery and his murders.

Ray, Stevie, and Julian sneak into the police station and recover the money but Julian turns on the other two and takes all the money. An alarm goes off, prompting Julian to go on a shooting frenzy and makes a one-man stand against all the police in the building, whilst Ray and Stevie, who is shot in the leg during the madness, escape with Julian's fate assumed to be being arrested after being knocked out with a gas bomb. They go to the M1 service station and are picked up by Connie, the three driving off to begin life anew.

== Cast ==
- Robert Carlyle – Ray
- Ray Winstone – Dave
- Steven Waddington – Stevie
- Philip Davis – Julian
- Damon Albarn – Jason
- Lena Headey – Connie
- Andrew Tiernan – Chris
- Peter Vaughan – Sonny
- Christine Tremarco – Sarah
- Sue Johnston – Alice
- Steve Sweeney – Weasel
- Gerry Conlon – Vince

== Release ==
The film opened in the UK on 26 September 1997 and grossed £292,043 from 126 cinemas in its opening weekend, placing at seventh at the box office.

== Soundtrack ==
Track listing
01. "Everything Has a Price to Pay" - Paul Weller
02. "Feel the Sunshine (DJ Pulse Remix)" - Alex Reece
03. "Opium Shuffle" - Death in Vegas
04. "London Calling" - The Clash
05. "Waiting for the Great Leap Forwards" - Billy Bragg
06. "Atom Bomb" - Fluke
07. "Kill me" - Space
08. "Doin' Jobz 4tha Mob (Radio Edit)" - Pigforce
09. "New Era"
10. "Lucky" - Lewis Taylor
11. "Subside" - Monkey
12. "Snakes Pass (Remix)" - A.P.E.
13. "On and On" - Longpigs
14. "London, Can You Wait?" - Gene
15. "Standing in Your Shadow" - Puressence
16. "Bullet" - Fluke
