= How the Mighty Fall =

Studio album by Mark Owen
- Released: 18 April 2005
- Recorded: 2004–2005
- Studios: Sunset Sound (Hollywood, California); Miloco Studios (London, England)
- Genres: Pop rock; indie pop; Brit pop
- Length: 64:19
- Labels: Sedna (UK); Edel (ROW)
- Producer: Tony Hoffer

Mark Owen chronology
In Your Own Time (2003)	How the Mighty Fall (2005)	The Art of Doing Nothing (2013)

Singles from How the Mighty Fall
- 1. "Makin' Out" Released: 7 June 2004; 2. "Believe in the Boogie" Released: 22 August 2005; 3. "Hail Mary" Released: 2 December 2005

How the Mighty Fall is the third solo studio album from Take That band member, Mark Owen. The album was released on 18 April 2005, nearly two years after his second album and produced by Tony Hoffer. The album sold 3,280 copies in the UK and missed the top 100, remaining his lowest selling album in his solo career. Three singles were released from the album: "Makin' Out", "Believe in the Boogie" and "Hail Mary". This was the last studio album released by Owen before the reunion of his band Take That.

Professional ratings
Review scores
Source	Rating
Allmusic	3/5 stars
MusicOMH	(positive)

== Track listing ==
All tracks are written by Mark Owen and produced by Tony Hoffer, additional songwriters are listed below.

Standard edition
No.	Title	Writer(s)	Length
1.	"They Do"		3:14
2.	"Sorry Lately"	Paul Freeman	3:33
3.	"Makin' Out"	Freeman	3:50
4.	"Waiting for the Girl"		2:38
5.	"Believe in the Boogie"	Freeman; Adam Falkner	3:59
6.	"3:15"	Freeman	3:06
7.	"Hail Mary"		5:27
8.	"Wasting Away"	Freeman	4:13
9.	"Stand"	Freeman; Jamie Norton	4:01
10.	"Come On"		5:39

Japanese edition bonus tracks
No.	Title	Writer(s)	Length
11.	"We Could Rule"	Rob Harris	4:03
12.	"Falling Star"	Guy Batson; Henry Priestman	4:25

German edition bonus tracks
No.	Title	Writer(s)	Length
11.	"Makin' Out" (acoustic)	Freeman	3:50
12.	"Believe in the Boogie" (acoustic)	Freeman; Falkner	3:59
13.	"Hail Mary" (acoustic)		5:27
14.	"Wasting Away" (acoustic)	Freeman	4:13

== Personnel ==
- Ben Mark - Acoustic Guitar, Guitar, Vocals (Backing Vocals)
- Jamie Norton - Piano, Vocals (Backing Vocals)
- David Campbell - Viola, Strings and Horns
- Paul Freeman - Guitar, Vocals (Backing Vocals)
- Mark Owen - Vocals (Backing Vocals)
- Dan Rothchild - Bass
- Rose Corrigan - Bassoon
- Larry Corbett - Cello
- Martin Jenkins - Recording
- Roger J. Manning Jr. - Keyboards, Piano, Synth
- Suzie Katayama - Cello, Contractor
- James Self - Tuba
- Leo Abraham - Piano
- Adam Falkner - Drums, Percussion
- Rachel Stegeman - Violin
- Tony Hoffer - Producer, Mixer
- Mark Christian - Guitar
- Daniel Higgins - Clarinet
- Joey Waronker - Drums, Percussion
- Neil Heal - Engineer
- Greg Kurstin - Piano
- Todd Burke - Engineer
- Sara Parkins - Violin
- Chris Reynolds - Engineer (Assistant)
- Bettie Ross-Blumer - Copyist
- Jon Lewis - Trumpet
- Dave Palmer - Keyboards, Synth (Additional)
- Bill Reichenbach Jr. - Trombone
- Jason Mott - Engineer (Assistant)
- Brian "Big Bass" Gardner - Mastering

== Chart performance ==
Chart	Peak position
German Albums (Offizielle Top 100)	56
UK Indie Chart (OCC)	28
