= The Cesarians =

London-based art rock band

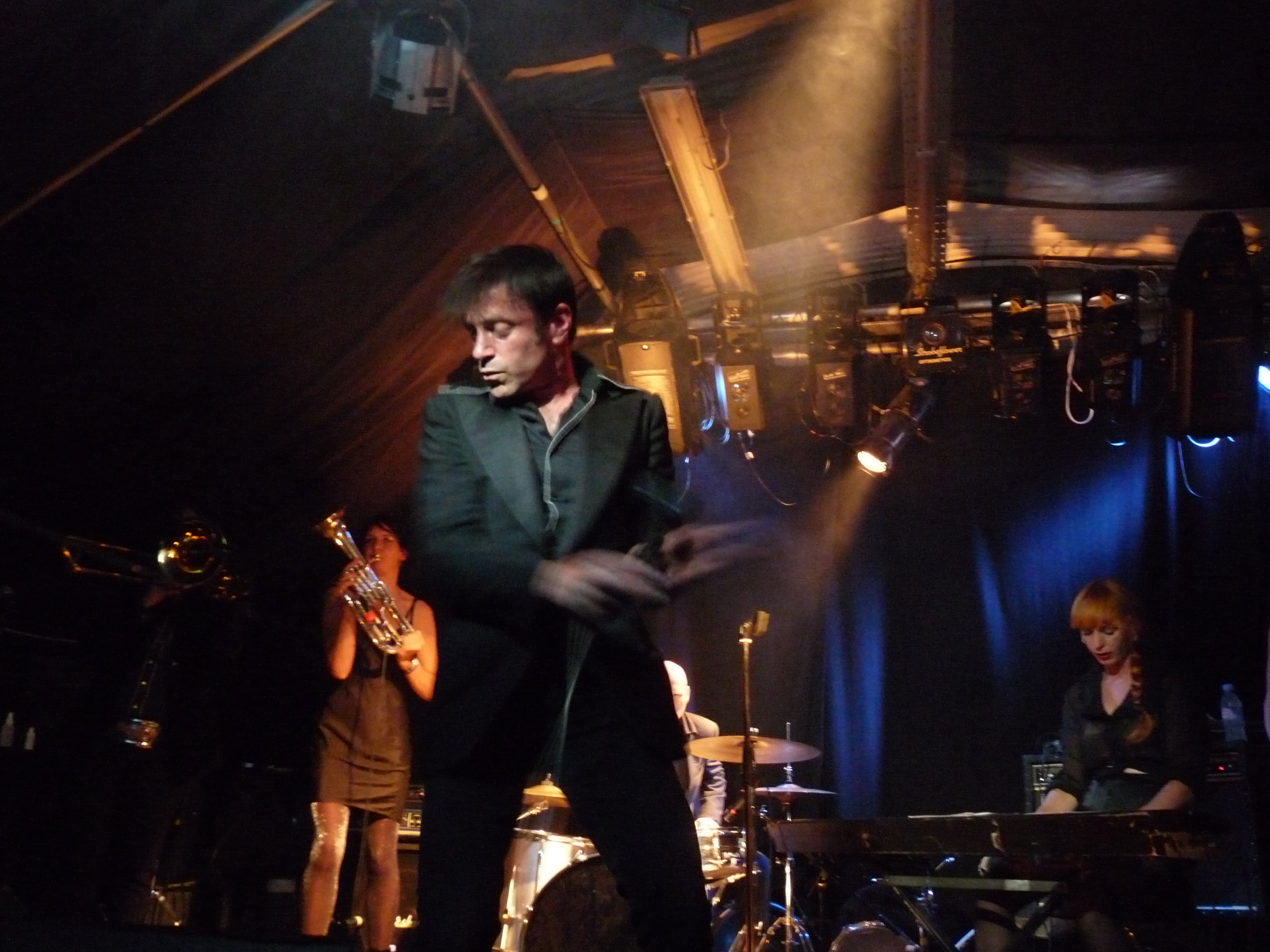
- The Cesarians, Corsica Studios, July 21, 2009

Background information
- Origin: Stoke Newington, London, England
- Genres: Art rock, experimental, pop music
- Years active: 2007–present
- Labels: Imprint, 12 Records, African Tape
- Members: Charlie Finke - vocals, harmonica, trumpet Justine Armatage - piano Beverley Crome - French horn, trumpet, vocals Suzi Owen - trombone Budge Magraw - bass Christine Lehlett - violin Ed Grimshaw - drums

The Cesarians are an English, London-based group, consisting of singer Charlie Finke, pianist Justine Armatage, drummer Jan Noble and an all-woman wind section. Their eponymous debut album, Cesarians 1, was recorded at Abbey Road studios and produced by Craig Leon.

In 2007 they opened for The Last Drive at the Indie Rocket Festival in Pescara, Italy and have since toured extensively throughout Europe, playing, most notably, at the Admiralspalast in Berlin and at the Donaufestival in Austria in 2009.

In April 2010, they supported Adam Ant at his notorious comeback gig at the Scala, and in June they performed alongside Martin Creed at London's ICA. They appeared at the Soy Festival in Nantes in October. In December 2010, they controversially revoked their pledge to "ban guitars" with the appointment of bassist, Budge Magraw (ex Gretschen Hofner with Justine Armatage).

== Discography ==
=== Studio albums ===
- Cesarians 1 (2009)
- Pure White Speed (2015)
- Rachel Frieda (2020)
