= Four Minute Warning (song) =

2003 single by Mark Owen

Single by Mark Owen

from the album In Your Own Time
- B-side: "Live If You Try"; "Jaywalker"
- Released: 4 August 2003
- Length: 4:05
- Label: Island
- Songwriters: Eliot Kennedy; Mark Owen
- Producer: Henry Priestman

Mark Owen singles chronology
"I Am What I Am" (1997)	"Four Minute Warning" (2003)	"Alone Without You" (2003)

"Four Minute Warning" is the first single released from Take That band member Mark Owen's second solo studio album, In Your Own Time. The single was released on 4 August 2003 as his first single on Island Records, after he was dropped from RCA in September 1997. The single peaked at number four on the UK Singles Chart, making it his third UK top-ten single. It has sold over 80,000 copies in the United Kingdom. The song also reached number 37 in Ireland and number 52 in the Netherlands.

== Synopsis ==
The song is based on the Four-minute warning, a public-alert system conceived by the British government during the Cold War (1953–1992) which was based on the estimated time it would take an ICBM from detection to reach its target. Owen's lyric, on one level, depicts people in denial of their own demise and the political circumstances that cause it. On the other, it gives the listener the impression of the shattered dreams of a group of people caught up in a nuclear strike on an unnamed British city. They also give a snapshot of the society through the people Owen portrays, while at the same time narrating the period between the UKWMO issuing a warning and the impact in real time (Owen's song is slightly over four minutes long). This is done with a countdown in the lyric akin to Crass's song They've got a bomb, which appears on their album The Feeding of the 5000. Each time the chorus is repeated, one minute is removed from the countdown. The lyrics near the end of the song provocatively ask the listener what would they do if such a warning was given, provoking listeners to empathise with the characters. The Chorus is an allusion to Peter Donaldson's warning message.

=== Video ===
The music video was directed by Lindy Heymann and runs on a total length of over four minutes. The video took over 14 hours to film. Prior to the video, Heymann was given the track only being told that it was by Mark Owen. After listening to the track, she late come up of the "end of the world" idea for the video. The concept for the video included a dark twist, but the label said that, from a marketing point of view, "this would push the 'Take That' fans away because Mark Owen is like the boy next door". Owen, however, praised her idea and even said that the idea "wasn't dark enough" and put the idea forward of him being dead at the end of the video. When the idea was suggested to the label, however, they were against it and tried to convince the director they want Owen to maintain his original image. The original idea was supposed to be filmed in an empty part of London, but this was impractical due to financial restrictions.

Like the lyric, the video is a snapshot of British society at the time of the conflict. It juxtaposes the characters' actions of denial with subsequent mass panic as an attack is imminent, while Owen walks through a British city whose streets become deserted. It is littered with subtle references to British cold war propaganda films, such as the infamous Protect and Survive series. The video subtly refers to the rising and falling note of the air attack sirens in the opening shots, which was the official warning of imminent attack since World War II (The Protect and Survive Public information films, The Warnings and Action After Warnings illustrate this). A discarded newspaper with the Headline "Four Minute Warning" being blown across the streets refers to Sound An Alarm (1971), a film commissioned by the Home Office's United Kingdom Warning and Monitoring Organisation to illustrate their role. In Sound an Alarm, we see a headline "War imminent?" on an advertisement for a newspaper being blown across the street, only for it to get stuck on the grille of a character's car. While it refers to propaganda films, it could also be seen to refer to the concept of nuclear winter through the darkening skies over the city (though these could also be references to the BBC Drama Threads by implicitly suggesting mushroom clouds)

== Track listings ==
UK CD single

1. "Four Minute Warning"
2. "Live If You Try"
3. "Jaywalker"
4. "Four Minute Warning" (video)

European CD single

1. "Four Minute Warning"
2. "Live If You Try"

== Charts ==
=== Weekly charts ===
Chart (2003)	Peak position
Europe (Eurochart Hot 100)	17
Ireland (IRMA)	37
Netherlands (Dutch Top 40 Tipparade)	9
Netherlands (Single Top 100)	52
Scottish Singles Sales (Official Charts)	2
UK Singles (Official Charts)	4
UK Airplay (Music Week)	41

=== Year-end charts ===
Chart (2003)	Position
UK Singles (OCC)	83
