= Believe in the Boogie =

Single by Mark Owen

from the album How the Mighty Fall
- B-side: "Makin' Out" (Acoustic Version); "3:15" (Junior Sanchez Mix)
- Released: 22 August 2005
- Recorded: 2004–2005
- Genre: Pop
- Length: 3:59
- Label: Sedna (UK); Edel (ROW)
- Songwriters: Mark Owen; Paul Freeman; Adam Falkner
- Producer: Tony Hoffer

Mark Owen singles chronology
| "Makin' Out" (2004) | "Believe in the Boogie" (2005) | "Hail Mary" (2005) |

"Believe in the Boogie" is the second single from Take That band member Mark Owen's independently released third solo studio album, How the Mighty Fall. The single was released on 22 August 2005. The single peaked at #57 on the UK Singles Chart, making it the lowest charting release of Owen's career up to that point. In the UK, the single was released on Owen's independent label, Sedna Records, while in the rest of the world, it was released on Edel Records.

== Track listing ==
UK CD single

1. "Believe in the Boogie" – 3:41
2. "Makin' Out" (Acoustic Version) – 4:05

German CD single

1. "Believe in the Boogie" (Radio Mix) – 3:31
2. "Believe in the Boogie" (UK Radio Edit) – 3:41
3. "Believe in the Boogie" (Acoustic Version) – 3:49
4. "Believe in the Boogie" (Album Version) – 3:59
5. "3:15" (Junior Sanchez Deep Breath Mix) – 7:04

== Chart performance ==
| Chart (2005) | Peak Position |
|---|---|
| Germany (GfK) | 78 |
| UK Singles (Official Charts) | 57 |
