= I Am What I Am (Mark Owen song) =

Single by Mark Owen

from the album Green Man
- B-side: "Mr. You"; "Johnny"
- Released: 1 August 1997
- Recorded: 1995–1996
- Genre: Britpop
- Length: 4:06
- Label: RCA
- Songwriter: Mark Owen
- Producer: Craig Leon

Mark Owen singles chronology
"Clementine" (1997)	"I Am What I Am" (1997)	"Four Minute Warning" (2003)

"I Am What I Am" is the third and final single to be released from Take That band member Mark Owen's debut solo album, Green Man. The single was released on 1 August 1997. The single peaked at number 29 on the UK Singles Chart, becoming his worst performing single from Green Man. "I Am What I Am" was originally intended to become the fourth single from the album, however due to ongoing battles between Owen and the label, became his final single on RCA Records before he was dropped.

== Track listing ==
UK CD single #1

1. "I Am What I Am" – 4:21
2. "Mr. You" – 4:23
3. "Johnny" – 3:12
4. "Clementine" (remix) – 3:56

UK CD single #2

1. "I Am What I Am" – 4:21
2. "Is That What It's All About" (live) – 5:11
3. "Secondhand Wonderland" (live) – 6:55
4. "I Am What I Am" (remix) – 4:06

UK cassette

1. "I Am What I Am" – 4:21
2. "Johnny" – 3:12

Promotional single

1. "I Am What I Am" – 4:06
2. "I Am What I Am" (album version) – 4:21
3. "Child" (radio edit) – 3:48
4. "Clementine" (remix) – 3:56

== Chart performance ==
Chart (1997)	Peak position
Estonia (Eesti Top 20)	7
Scotland (OCC)	24
Spain Airplay (Top 40 Radio)	21
Taiwan (IFPI Taiwan)	10
UK Singles (OCC)	29
UK Airplay (Music Week)	32
