= Mark Owen =

English singer-songwriter (born 1972)

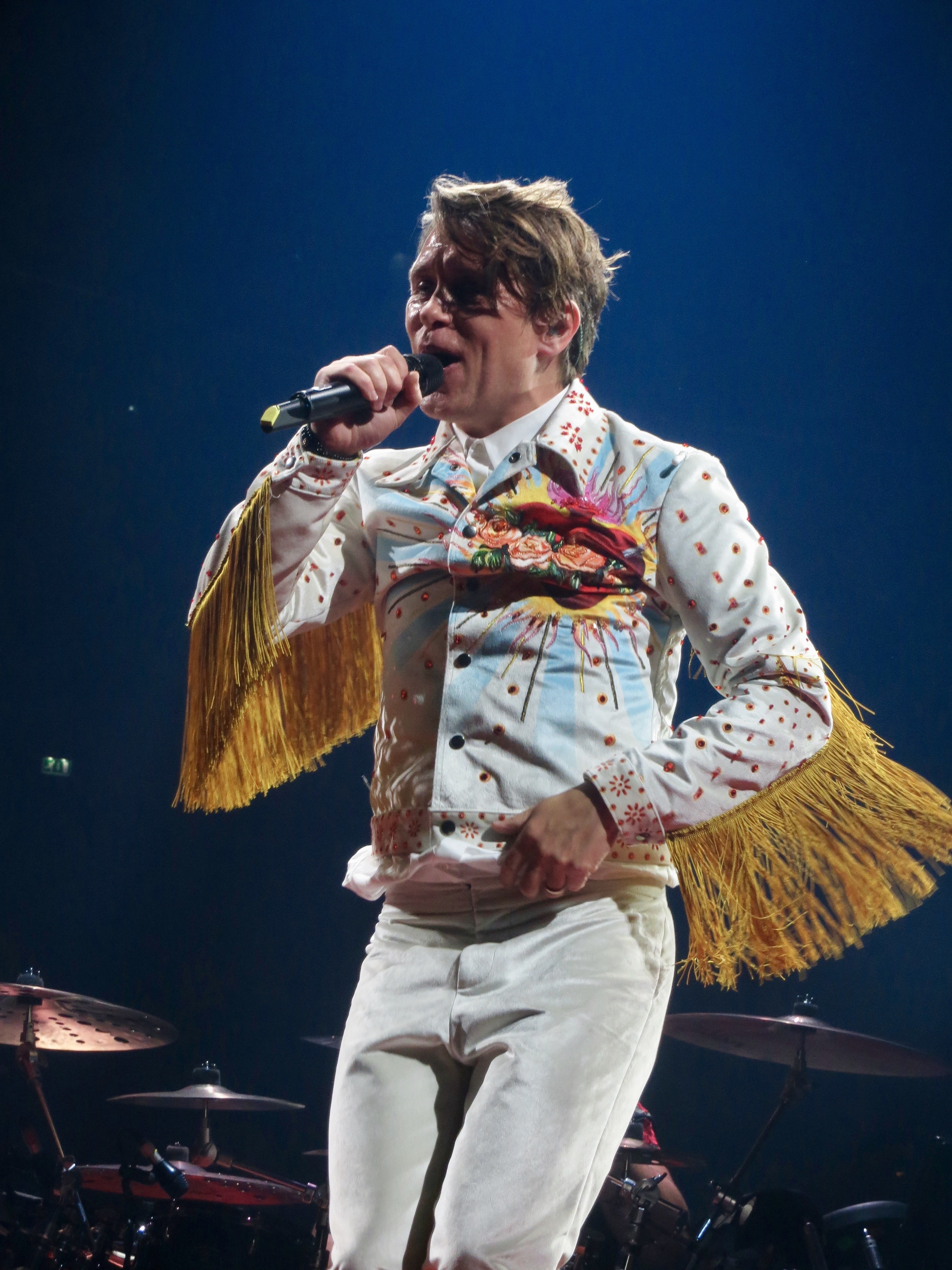
- Owen performing in Glasgow in 2017
- Born: 27 January 1972 (age 54); Oldham, Lancashire, England
- Occupations: Singer; songwriter
- Years active: 1989–1997; 2002–present
- Spouse: Emma Ferguson (m. 2009)
- Children: 3
- Musical career
- Genres: Pop; pop rock; rock; soft rock; electronic; alternative rock
- Instruments: Vocals; keyboards; guitar; bass guitar
- Labels: Sony BMG; Island; Sedna; MCA; Polydor; Mercury
- Member of: Take That
- Website: markowenofficial.com

Mark Anthony Patrick Owen (born 27 January 1972) is an English singer and songwriter best known for being a member of pop group and band Take That; as of 2024, the group have sold 14.4 million albums and 14.6 million singles in the UK. In Owen's solo career, he has released five studio albums: Green Man (1996), In Your Own Time (2003), How the Mighty Fall (2005), The Art of Doing Nothing (2013) and his most recent, Land of Dreams, which was released in September 2022 and debuted at number 5 on the UK Official Albums Chart.

== Early life ==
Growing up, Owen lived in a small council house in Oldham with his mother Mary, his father Keith, brother Daniel, and sister Tracey. His father was a decorator, later getting a job at a police station. His mother was a supervisor in a bakery. Owen was educated at Holy Rosary Primary and St Augustine's Catholic Schools, both in Oldham. He had little interest in music and played football briefly for Chadderton F.C., in addition to having trials at Manchester United and Rochdale. Before auditioning for Take That, he worked at Barclays in Failsworth.

== Take That ==
=== 1989–1996: Early success ===
After selecting Gary Barlow as the group's lead singer in 1989, Nigel Martin-Smith introduced Owen, Howard Donald, Jason Orange and finally Robbie Williams to the fold. The group were signed to RCA records, and after a number of top 40 hits, eventually secured their first number one with Barlow's "Pray". Previous hits included "A Million Love Songs", "It Only Takes a Minute" and "Could It Be Magic".

The band's debut album Take That & Party was released on 17 August 1992. It reached number two on the UK Album Chart. The following year saw the release of their second album, Everything Changes. It went straight in at number one on the UK Albums Chart and spawned four number-one singles, as well as "Why Can't I Wake Up with You" and "Love Ain't Here Anymore" hitting number two and three respectively. Owen sang lead vocals on "Babe", which was released in December 1993. Their third album Nobody Else went straight to number 1 and was to be their last studio album of the '90s. The album had three number-one singles, including "Back for Good" which peaked at number seven on the US Billboard Hot 100 and was brought forward an unprecedented six weeks before its official release such was the demand for the single. Owen also sang lead vocals on "The Day After Tomorrow" from the album. A Greatest Hits collection followed again reaching number one. The album featured the band's eighth number-one single "How Deep Is Your Love". This was to be the first single released by Take That as a four piece (without Williams) and it was their last single until they reformed in 2005.

Although Owen's vocal contributions were limited in Take That's original run, he was arguably the most popular member of the group, on account of his boyish good looks and sweet demeanour, regularly earning awards such as Smash Hits' "Most Fanciable Male in the World" and "Best Haircut".

=== 2005–present: reunion ===
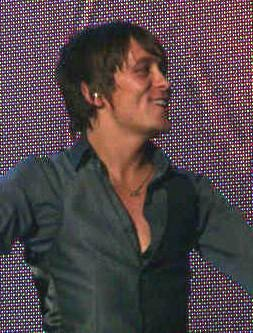
Owen during the Beautiful World tour in 2007

Owen returned to the spotlight in the TV documentary, Take That: For the Record in 2005. Following this success and renewed interest, Take That experienced a career renaissance in 2005 when the post-Williams line-up reformed for a sell-out stadium tour. The band released their comeback single "Patience" which went to number 1 for four weeks while also topping the charts across Europe. Patience was also voted The Record of the Year in 2006 and won a Brit for single of the year. This was followed with "Shine" which featured Owen on lead vocals and became the band's tenth number-one single. Take That's first album of new material in over ten years, Beautiful World, was released on 24 November 2006. The album peaked at number 1 in the UK Album Chart selling over 2.8 million copies in the UK alone to date. It was re-released as a tour edition with hit single "Rule the World" in 2007 and peaked again at number 1.

In June and July 2009, Take That performed the record breaking tour Take That Presents: The Circus Live throughout the United Kingdom which sold over one million tickets in five hours.

It was announced that the group was in the process of writing Take That's sixth studio album, set for release in late 2010. The album, Progress, was the first to feature the original line-up since their 1995 album, Nobody Else. The band also announced a stadium tour entitled Progress Live which took place in 2011. The tickets for the tour went on sale on 29 October 2010. Due to unprecedented high public demand for tickets, ticketmaster websites across the UK and Ireland crashed and all initial tour dates sold out in under 15 minutes. It was reported that a record breaking one million tickets were snapped up on the first day of sale, resulting in Take That smashing the previous box office record of tickets sold which was set in 2008 by Take That Present: The Circus Live.

The lead single from Progress was announced as "The Flood". The single debuted at number 2, selling over 500,000 copies since release. On the first day of the release of Progress, the album sold over 235,000 copies across the UK, making it the fastest selling record of the century. On 21 November 2010, Progress debuted at number one in the United Kingdom, becoming the band's seventh number-one album. By the end of its first week on sale the album sold over 520,000, making it the second fastest-selling album of all-time in UK chart history. To date Progress has sold 2.4 million copies in the UK and has achieved similar chart success across Europe. In June 2011, Take That released their first extended play collection entitled Progressed which returned the band to number 1 in the UK on its first week of release as well as charting across Europe.

== Solo career ==
=== 1996–1997: Green Man ===
After Take That split, Owen became the first of the band's ex-members to release a solo record. He reached number three in the UK Singles Chart with his debut single, "Child". His second single, "Clementine", also went to number three. In 1996 his album Green Man was released, charting at a number 33. After another single, "I Am What I Am", charted at number 29, Owen was dropped by BMG Records in late 1997.

Despite the album being viewed as having under performed it sold 1 million copies worldwide.

=== 2002–2003: Celebrity Big Brother and In Your Own Time ===
Owen won the second series of Celebrity Big Brother in November 2002 with 77% of the public vote against television presenter Les Dennis. Owen broke down in tears, overwhelmed by the fans' support. After being invited to perform on stage with Robbie Williams at Knebworth, he returned to the spotlight and signed a deal with Island/Universal Records. In August 2003, Owen returned to the charts with the Top 5 hit, "Four Minute Warning", which remained in the Top 40 for eight weeks. His second album, In Your Own Time, was released in November 2003, entering the charts at number 59. After a second single, "Alone Without You", charted at number 26, Owen was dropped by Island/Universal Records.

=== 2004–2006: How the Mighty Fall ===
In April 2004 he established his own record company, Sedna Records. One report around 2004 alleged that Owen was looking for a day job, but he simply said "Doing it properly isn't cheap. These are my indulgences. I don't have a Ferrari, I have two albums." Mark released his first single "Makin' Out" which charted at No. 30 on the UK Singles Chart, making it his highest charted single released in an independent label. He released his third solo album, How the Mighty Fall on 18 April 2005, which was recorded at Sunset Studios, Los Angeles, in 2004. It reached No. 56 in Germany. Owen said that it was more "his" album than the last couple because he had had full control over every aspect of the record and it was a true representation of where he was in his life. On the strength of this release, he was picked up by Caroline Elleray (Coldplay, Keane), resulting in his signing his publishing deal to BMG Music Publishing. Mark released his second single "Believe in the Boogie", charting at No. 57 in the UK charts, making it his lowest charting single at that time. Although it did not chart well, his second single was added to the European soundtrack of the American film Mr. and Mrs. Smith starring Brad Pitt and Angelina Jolie. In February 2006 he released "Hail Mary" as a single from the album.

=== 2012–2013: The Art of Doing Nothing ===
In March 2012, according to a report by The Sun Mark was planning to relaunch his solo career. A source said: "Mark has already made serious headway. He has put together new material in the studio with top writers and is planning more sessions over the next few months. All the lads are behind him. Success in his own right and his own writing material have always been a massive motivation, so he's a happy man." NME announced in October 2012 that Owen had finished recording the album and planned to tour the following spring.

In March 2013, further details of the album emerged, including the album title, The Art of Doing Nothing. The album was then mixed in New York at the Electric Lady Studios by Michael Brauer, Charlie Russell, Ben Mark and Jamie Norton. He confirmed the album would feature a collaboration with singer-songwriter Ren Harvieu, and production from Alt-J producer Charlie Russell. A source said: "Mark is really excited about the album – he sees it more as a collaborative work than a solo album, something he made with a collection of his friends. He's worked with some really interesting people on it including Ren Harvieu and Charlie Russell, the producer who has worked with Alt-J, as well as some brilliant illustrators, photographers and film makers. People will be surprised by the results – it's not what fans will expect." The album was to be released on 10 June 2013.

On 1 May 2013, Owen uploaded new photographs and videos to his official website, including the deluxe album artwork, which depicts him in a white room, scribbling on the wall, whilst wearing a dapper hat. A tagline to accompany the artwork reads: "Every idea has a starting place. Nothing begins in an empty space." The two videos consist of a montage video, picturing the photo shoot that shot the album cover, and the second, which is a short interview with Owen, in which he discusses the album's contents and cover. Following the announcement of his fourth studio album, Owen also confirmed that he would tour the UK and Germany throughout June.

=== 2022–present: Land of Dreams ===
On 1 February 2022, it was revealed that Owen had been writing new material, potentially for a new solo album. A source close to Owen said, "He has been writing some songs and they are sounding pretty good. It's said the singer will be performing at the Isle of Wight Festival in June, It is early days, but he is [...] toying with the idea of another solo record. Nothing is nailed down, but given he has done a solo album every 10 years or so for the last two decades, now feels like a nice time to think about it again."

On 13 May 2022, Owen officially announced on his social media platforms that he was making a new record, but shared no further details at the time. On 18 May 2022, he announced his new album "Land of Dreams", alongside its first single "You Only Want Me".

On 19 May 2022, "You Only Want Me" was released as the lead single, alongside the announcement of the release date of the album, which is 23 September 2022. The single entered the UK Downloads charts at number 76 and the UK Sales charts at 78. Owen performed the song at the National Lottery Big Jubilee party, along with the Take That hit "Shine". Owen also performed his single live on The Late Late Show with James Corden, his first US televised performance as a solo artist, and second overall. On 10 June 2022, his second single "Are You Looking for Billy?" was released. This was followed on 10 August 2022, with third single "Magic". Land of Dreams was released on 23 September 2022. On 26 September, the UK Official Charts predicted that the album would chart at number 2 on the Official Albums Charts. On 30 September 2022, the album debuted at number 5 on the UK Official Albums Chart Top 100, becoming Owen's highest charting solo studio album. Land of Dreams debuted at number 3 on the UK Album Downloads and Sales Charts. Due to digital sales of the album, "Magic" debuted at number 76 on the UK Official Singles Sales Chart Top 100.

== Personal life ==
Owen is married to actress Emma Ferguson. They have a son and two daughters. He is a patron of the charity Beyond Autism.

In March 2010, in the midst of recording for Progress, Owen publicly admitted to having multiple affairs, one of which lasted from late 2004 until September 2009, and an alcohol problem. Six months later, he checked into a private clinic for rehabilitation related to his drinking.

In June 2012, it was revealed that along with Take That band-mates Howard Donald and Gary Barlow, Owen had invested £26 million in music industry investment schemes. The news attracted controversy when it was understood that the schemes could serve as tax shelters for high-net-worth people. Lawyers responded to the claims, stating the band members "paid significant tax, and that they believed the schemes were not for tax avoidance purposes but were legitimate commercial enterprises." In an interview with BBC Radio in 2020, Paul Stenning, who worked for the band in 1995 under their financial advisor Simon Orange, explained the way the band's finances were structured, saying they were "meticulously disseminated".

In 2014, Owen was announced as an Ambassador for Amber Run on Channel 4's Launched. Owen also participated in both Soccer Aid 2012 and 2014. He is a supporter of Liverpool F.C.. In 2024 Owen released a coffee blend named 'Shine' in collaboration with Change Please, a social enterprise aiming to tackle homelessness.

== Discography ==
=== Albums ===
List of albums, with selected chart positions
Title	Album details	Peak chart positions	
Title	Album details	UK	SCO
Green Man	Released: 2 December 1996; Label: RCA; Formats: CD, cassette	33	50
In Your Own Time	Released: 3 November 2003; Label: Island; Formats: CD	59	46
How the Mighty Fall	Released: 18 April 2005; Label: Sedna; Formats: CD	— (Note: "How the Mighty Fall" did not enter the UK Albums Chart, but peaked at number 28 on the UK Independent Albums Chart.)	—
The Art of Doing Nothing	Released: 7 June 2013; Label: Polydor; Formats: CD, digital download	29	36
Land of Dreams	Release date: 23 September 2022; Label: BMG; Formats: CD, vinyl, cassette	5	2
"—" denotes album that did not chart or was not released in that territory.

=== Singles ===
==== As lead artist ====
List of singles, with selected chart positions
Title	Year	Peak chart positions		Album
Title	Year	UK	SCO	Album
"Child"	1996	3	3	Green Man
"Clementine"	1997	3	3	Green Man
"I Am What I Am"	1997	29	24	Green Man
"Four Minute Warning"	2003	4	2	In Your Own Time
"Alone Without You"	2003	26	22	In Your Own Time
"Makin' Out"	2004	30	29	How the Mighty Fall
"Believe in the Boogie"	2005	57	—	How the Mighty Fall
"Hail Mary"	2006	103	—	How the Mighty Fall
"Stars"	2013	135	—	The Art of Doing Nothing
"You Only Want Me"	2022	— (Note: "You Only Want Me" did not enter the UK Singles Chart, but peaked at number 76 on the UK Singles Downloads Chart.)	—	Land of Dreams
"Are You Looking for Billy?"	2022	—	—	Land of Dreams
"Magic"	2022	— (Note: "Magic" did not enter the UK Singles Chart, but peaked at number 76 on the UK Singles Downloads Chart.)	—	Land of Dreams
"—" denotes a recording that did not chart or was not released in that territory.

==== As featured artist ====
Title	Year	Album
"Hold Up a Light" (with Grasmere Primary School)	2019	Non-album single

=== Music videos ===
Title	Year	Director
"Child"	1996	Lee Hye-in
"Clementine"	1997	
"I Am What I Am"	1997	Peter Demetris
"Four Minute Warning"	2003	Lindy Heymann
"Alone Without You"	2003	Phil Griffin
"Makin' Out"	2004	Paul Donnelly
"Believe in the Boogie"	2005	Gregg Masuak
"Stars"	2013	James Slater
"S.A.D." ft. Ren Harvieu	2013	
"Carnival"	2013	James Slater
"Raven"	2014	Matt Robinson
"You Only Want Me"	2022	
"Magic"	2022	

Notes

Preceded by Jack Dee	Celebrity Big Brother UK Winner; Series 2 (2002)	Succeeded by Bez
