= The Art of Doing Nothing =

Studio album by Mark Owen
- Released: 7 June 2013
- Recorded: 2012–2013
- Genre: Pop; electronic
- Length: 65:12
- Label: Polydor
- Producer: Charlie Russell, Bradley Spence, Starsmith

Mark Owen chronology
How the Mighty Fall (2005)	The Art of Doing Nothing (2013)	Land of Dreams (2022)

Singles from The Art of Doing Nothing
- 1. "Stars" Released: 3 May 2013

The Art of Doing Nothing is the fourth solo studio album from Take That band member and singer-songwriter Mark Owen. The album was released on 7 June 2013 in Germany and 10 June 2013 in the UK, eight years since the release of his third studio album, How the Mighty Fall. The album was produced by Charlie Russell and Bradley Spence, with additional production on two tracks by Starsmith. The album was preceded by the release of the lead single "Stars", debuting at number 135 on the UK Albums Chart. The album has sold 6,360 copies in the UK.

== Background ==
In March 2012, The Sun reported that Owen was planning to re-launch his solo career and that he had been putting together new material. It was reported in June 2012 that Owen had recorded a number of electronic tracks and was toying with the idea of including different genres within the same project; it was also report that he had been working with producer Starsmith, who had previously worked with the likes of Ellie Goulding and Cheryl Cole. In October 2012, Owen previewed the recording of the album during the ninth series of The X Factor, inviting bandmate Gary Barlow and his category of contestants along to the recording studio to watch him making final touches to the album.

In March 2013, further details of the album emerged, including the album title, "The Art of Doing Nothing" and the conformation that Owen had recorded the majority of the album in his garden shed studio, known as the "rabbit hutch". The album was then mixed in New York at the Electric Lady Studios by Michael Brauer, Charlie Russell, Ben Mark and Jamie Norton. He confirmed the album would feature a collaboration with singer-songwriter Ren Harvieu along with production from Alt-J producer Charlie Russell. A source said, "Mark is really excited about the album—he sees it more as a collaborative work than a solo album, something he made with a collection of his friends. He's worked with some really interesting people on it including Ren Harvieu and Charlie Russell, the producer who has worked with Alt-J, as well as some brilliant illustrators, photographers, and film makers. People will be surprised by the results—it's not what fans will expect."

Owen said of the album title, "It's called The Art of Doing Nothing. It's like a project. The name came about because when anybody asks me what I'm up to, I say 'nothing', so now I'm calling it "The Art of Doing Nothing". On 1 May 2013, Owen uploaded new photographs and videos to his official website, including the deluxe album artwork, which depicts Mark in a white room, scribbling on the wall, while wearing a dapper hat. A tagline to accompany the artwork reads: "Every idea has a starting place. Nothing begins in an empty space." The two videos consist of a montage video, picturing the photo-shoot that shot the album cover and the second, which is a short interview with Owen, in which he discusses the album's contents and cover.

== Reception ==
The album received positive reviews, especially for the single "Stars" and "S.A.D.". Heather Maloney of Examiner.com described the album as "an amazing work of art". Robert Copsey from Digital Spy wrote: "For an artist often perceived to be bashful, the results are surprisingly compelling."

== Singles ==
"Stars" was released as the lead single from the album on 3 May 2013. The single premiered on BBC Radio 2 on the Ken Bruce show, before the music video was released later that afternoon. The video depicts Owen in an astronaut suit, walking around a city centre, in a shopping mall, and dancing at a disco, all while trying to escape from the suit.

== Track listing ==
The standard edition of the album contains ten tracks, while the deluxe contains an extra three. A super-deluxe boxset, containing a fifteen track album, five art prints (one of which is signed and limited to just fifty copies), and a headed notepad with the Mark Owen logo on, is available from Owen's official store.

Standard edition
No.	Title	Writer(s)	Producer(s)	Length
1.	"Giveaway"	Mark Owen, Ben Mark, Jamie Norton	Charlie Russell, Bradley Spence	4:09
2.	"The One"	Owen, Mark, Norton	Russell, Spence	4:05
3.	"Stars"	Owen, Mark, Norton	Russell, Spence	4:04
4.	"Carnival"	Owen, Mark, Norton	Russell, Spence	3:50
5.	"Animals"	Owen, Mark, Norton	Russell, Spence	4:26
6.	"Us and Ours"	Owen, Mark, Norton, Fin Dow-Smith	Russell, Spence, Starsmith (co.)	4:42
7.	"Heaven's Falling" (featuring Jake Emlyn)	Owen, Mark, Norton, Jake Emlyn	Russell, Spence	5:45
8.	"Raven"	Owen, Mark, Norton	Russell, Spence	4:12
9.	"S.A.D." (featuring Ren Harvieu)	Owen, Mark, Norton, Smith	Russell, Spence, Starsmith (add.)	4:55
10.	"End of Everything"	Owen, Mark, Norton, Smith	Russell, Spence	5:09

Deluxe edition bonus tracks
No.	Title	Writer(s)	Producer(s)	Length
11.	"Ghost"	Owen, Mark, Norton, Smith	Russell, Spence	3:39
12.	"Morning Belle"	Owen, Mark, Norton, Smith	Russell, Spence	3:51
13.	"The Lamb"	Owen, Mark, Norton, Smith	Russell, Spence	2:53

Super deluxe edition bonus tracks
No.	Title	Writer(s)	Producer(s)	Length
11.	"Ghost"	Owen, Mark, Norton, Smith	Russell, Spence	3:39
12.	"Morning Belle"	Owen, Mark, Norton, Smith	Russell, Spence	3:51
13.	"The Lamb"	Owen, Mark, Norton, Smith	Russell, Spence	2:53
14.	"Stars" (Matrix & Futurebound Vox remix)	Owen, Mark, Norton	Russell, Spence	4:13
15.	"Stars" (Matrix & Futurebound Dub remix)	Owen, Mark, Norton	Russell, Spence	4:11

== Personnel ==
- Solá Akingbolá – Percussion
- Alexander Beitzke – Engineer, Programming
- Mark Bengston – Assistant
- Michael H. Brauer – Mixing
- Lucy Butler – Prop Stylist, Set Stylist
- Fin Dow-Smith – Composer
- Jason Elliott – Engineer
- Jake Emlyn – Composer, Featured Artist, Vocals
- Steph Fraser – background vocals
- Brendan Collins (a.k.a. Futurebound) – Remixing
- Ryan Gilligan – Assistant
- Jon Green – Guitar, Keyboards, background vocals
- Isobel Griffiths – Orchestra Contractor
- Ren Harvieu – Featured Artist, Vocals
- Andy Hughes – Engineer
- Lucy Jules – background vocals
- Graham Kearns – Guitar, background vocals
- Dougal Lott – Engineer
- Bob Ludwig – Mastering
- Will Malone – Brass Arrangement, String Arrangements
- Ben Mark – Composer, Guitar, Ukulele, background vocals
- Jamie Quinn (a.k.a. Matrix) – Remixing
- Charlotte Matthews – Assistant Contractor
- Jamie Norton – Composer, Keyboards, Piano, background vocals
- Mark Owen – Composer, Vocals
- Martin Owen – French Horn
- Camilla Pay – Harp
- Perou – Photography
- Charlie Russell – Engineer, Producer, Programming
- Ash Soan – Drums
- Bradley Spence – Engineer, Producer, Programming
- Starsmith – Additional Production, Keyboards, Producer, Programming
- Mark "Spike" Stent – Mixing
- Paul Turner – Bass
- Tom Upex – Engineer

== Charts ==
Chart (2013)	Peak position
Belgian Albums (Ultratop Wallonia)	160
Greek Albums (IFPI Greece)	55
Irish Albums (IRMA)	78
Scottish Albums (OCC)	36
UK Albums (OCC)	29
UK Album Downloads (OCC)	53

== Release history ==
Region	Date	Format	Label
Germany	7 June 2013	CD, digital download	Polydor Records
United Kingdom	10 June 2013	CD, digital download	Polydor Records
United States	11 June 2013	CD, digital download	Polydor Records
