= Makin' Out =

Single by Mark Owen

from the album How the Mighty Fall
- B-side: "Good For Me"
- Released: 7 June 2004
- Recorded: 2003–2004
- Genre: Pop
- Length: 3:50
- Label: Sedna
- Songwriters: Mark Owen; Paul Freeman
- Producer: Tony Hoffer

Mark Owen singles chronology
| "Alone Without You" (2003) | "Makin' Out" (2004) | "Believe in the Boogie" (2005) |

"Makin' Out" is the first single to be released from Take That band member Mark Owen's independently released third solo album, How the Mighty Fall. The single was released on 7 June 2004. The single peaked at #30 on the UK Singles Chart, and in an interview with BBC Radio 1, Owen blamed this upon poor promotion. "Makin' Out" became the most successful of Mark's independently released singles.

== Track listing ==
UK CD single #1

1. "Makin' Out" – 3:50
2. "Good For Me" – 4:11

UK CD single #2

1. "Makin' Out" – 3:50
2. "Makin' Out" [Demo Version] – 3:18
3. "Makin' Out" [Enhanced Video – Seven Minute Short Film Version] – 7:00

== Chart performance ==
| Chart (2004) | Peak Position |
|---|---|
| Scottish Singles Sales (Official Charts) | 29 |
| UK Singles (Official Charts) | 30 |

== Covers ==
Pomplamoose covered this song on their album "Tribute to Famous People."
