= Green Man (album) =

Studio album by Mark Owen
- Released: 2 December 1996
- Recorded: 1995–1996
- Studios: Abbey Road Studios (London, England)
- Genres: Pop; rock; pop rock; indie pop; Britpop
- Length: 55:28
- Labels: RCA, BMG
- Producers: John Leckie, Craig Leon

Mark Owen chronology
Green Man (1996)	In Your Own Time (2003)

Singles from Green Man
- 1. "Child" Released: 18 November 1996; 2. "Clementine" Released: 3 February 1997; 3. "I Am What I Am" Released: 1 August 1997

Professional ratings
Review scores
Source	Rating
AllMusic	3/5 stars
Music Week	4/5 stars

Green Man is the debut solo album from English singer-songwriter Mark Owen. The album was released through RCA and BMG on 2 December 1996, months after the official split of his former boyband, Take That. The album was recorded at Abbey Road Studios in London. Three singles were released from the album: "Child", "Clementine" and "I Am What I Am". The album peaked at number 33 on the UK Albums Chart. The album was re-released in 2003 following the release of his second studio album, In Your Own Time which had been released earlier that year. Green Man has been certified gold by the British Phonographic Industry (BPI) for shipments of 100,000 copies in the United Kingdom. The album sold 1 million copies worldwide.

Green Man was written entirely by Mark Owen himself (except for two tracks): "The easiest option for Mark Owen who came out of Take That was to get some other people to write some nice catchy pop tunes, and maybe I could have done that for a couple of years. Then I probably would have been hated by everybody and fell by the wayside. But there wouldn’t have been an album unless I’d written it and it had come from me and I felt like it was my album. That’s all I was interested in."

Unlike the dance-pop music of his former group Take That, Green Man sees Owen develop a sound influenced by Britpop and other forms of alternative rock. Working with alternative rock producer John Leckie, the album has been described as having an "attractive sheen" that "sounds like a cross between Radiohead and the Stone Roses", two bands that Leckie had worked with. The album has also been described as an indie pop album. Owen's former Take That bandmate Robbie Williams would also pursue a Britpop-influenced direction on his debut album Life thru a Lens (1997).

== Track listing ==
Green Man track listing
No.	Title	Writer(s)	Producer(s)	Length
1.	"Green Man"	Mark Owen	John Leckie, Craig Leon	5:40
2.	"Clementine"	Mark Owen	Craig Leon	4:10
3.	"Child"	Mark Owen, Tim Laws, Martin Brammer	Craig Leon	5:05
4.	"Are You with Me"	Mark Owen, Tim Laws, Martin Brammer	John Leckie, Craig Leon	3:45
5.	"Naturally"	Mark Owen	John Leckie, Craig Leon	3:16
6.	"Ask Him To"	Mark Owen	John Leckie, Craig Leon	4:36
7.	"Backpocket and Me"	Mark Owen	John Leckie, Craig Leon	4:48
8.	"Move On"	Mark Owen	John Leckie, Craig Leon	4:20
9.	"Secondhand Wonderland"	Mark Owen	John Leckie, Craig Leon	5:46
10.	"My Love"	Mark Owen	John Leckie, Craig Leon	4:28
11.	"I Am What I Am"	Mark Owen	Craig Leon	4:21
12.	"Is That What It's All About"	Mark Owen	John Leckie, Craig Leon	4:28

Re-issue bonus tracks
No.	Title	Writer(s)	Producer(s)	Length
13.	"Confused"	Mark Owen	John Leckie	4:16
14.	"Home"	Mark Owen	John Leckie	5:04
15.	"Child" (acoustic)	Mark Owen, Tim Laws, Martin Brammer	John Leckie, Craig Leon	3:35
16.	"Johnny"	Mark Owen	Craig Leon	3:12
17.	"Mr. You"	Mark Owen	Craig Leon	4:23

== Charts and certifications ==
=== Charts ===
Chart performance for Green Man
Chart (1996)	Peak position
Australian Albums (ARIA)	83
Austrian Albums (Ö3 Austria Top 75)	28
Belgian (Ultratop 50 Vlaanderen) Albums	25
Belgian (Ultratop 50 Wallonia) Albums	40
Dutch Albums (MegaCharts)	62
European Albums Chart	26
Finnish Albums (Suomen virallinen lista)	27
German Albums (Media Control AG)	46
Italian Albums (FIMI)	15
Italian Albums (Musica e Dischi)	15
Japanese Albums (Oricon)	93
Scottish Albums (OCC)	50
Spanish Albums (PROMUSICAE)	3
Swiss Albums (Schweizer Hitparade)	22
UK Albums (OCC)	33

=== Year-end charts ===
Chart (1996)	Position
Italian Albums (Musica e dischi)	97

=== Certifications ===
Certifications for Green Man
Region	Certification	Certified units/sales
Spain (Promusicae)	Platinum	100,000^{^}
United Kingdom (BPI)	Gold	100,000^{^}
^{^} Shipments figures based on certification alone.
