= Child (Mark Owen song) =

1996 single by Mark Owen

Single by Mark Owen

from the album Green Man
- B-side: "Confused"; "Home"
- Released: 18 November 1996
- Length: 3:48
- Label: RCA; BMG
- Songwriters: Mark Owen; Tim Laws; Martin Brammer
- Producer: Craig Leon

Mark Owen singles chronology
"Child" (1996)	"Clementine" (1997)

"Child" is a song by Take That band member Mark Owen, released as his debut solo single on 18 November 1996 by RCA Records and BMG. It served as the lead single from his debut album, Green Man (1996). He told in an interview, "It was the first song I wrote, and while I was writing the others I always knew it was going to be the first." "Child" peaked at number three on the UK Singles Chart, making it Owen's joint-most-successful single of his solo career. It was certified silver and sold over 200,000 copies. The song reached number one in Lithuania, Spain, and Taiwan and peaked within the top 10 in Austria, Belgium, Czech Republic, Denmark, Estonia, Ireland, Israel and Switzerland.

== Critical reception ==
Pan-European magazine Music & Media described "Child" as "a subtle ballad, full of genuine emotions, which will pull everyone's heartstrings." A reviewer from Music Week gave it a top score of five out of five, writing, "Already one of the favourites for the Christmas number one slot, this ballad has hints of early Seventies John Lennon and should appeal to the teenies and their parents. A surefire hit." Retrospectively, Pop Rescue stated that "it's a great song, that orchestrally, lyrically, and vocally shines here."

== Track listings ==
- UK CD1
1. "Child"
2. "Confused"
3. "Home"
4. "Child" (acoustic version)
- UK CD2
1. "Child"
2. "Confused"
3. "Child" (instrumental)
- UK cassette single
1. "Child"
2. "Confused"
- European CD single
1. "Child" (radio edit)
2. "Confused"
- Australian and Japanese CD single
1. "Child" (radio edit)
2. "Child" (full length)
3. "Confused"
4. "Home"

== Charts ==
=== Weekly charts ===
Chart (1996)	Peak position
Australia (ARIA)	24
Austria (Ö3 Austria Top 40)	10
Belgium (Ultratop 50 Flanders)	7
Belgium (Ultratop 50 Wallonia)	9
Czech Republic (IFPI CR)	3
Denmark (IFPI)	9
Estonia (Eesti Top 20)	10
Estonia Airplay (Eesti Top 25)	21
Europe (European Hot 100)	9
Europe (European AC Radio)	8
Europe (European Hit Radio)	12
Europe (Channel Crossovers)	6
Finland (Suomen virallinen lista)	11
France Airplay (SNEP)	75
Germany (GfK)	20
Greece (IFPI Greece)	2
Ireland (IRMA)	10
Israel (IBA)	2
Italy (Musica e dischi)	15
Italy Airplay (Music & Media)	10
Japan International (Oricon)	12
Latvia (Latvijas Top 40)	8
Lithuania (M-1)	1
Netherlands (Dutch Top 40)	27
Netherlands (Single Top 100)	28
Poland Airplay (Music & Media)	11
Spain (AFYVE)	1
Spain Airplay (Top 40 Radio)	1
Scottish Singles Sales (Official Charts)	3
Sweden (Sverigetopplistan)	30
Switzerland (Schweizer Hitparade)	5
Taiwan (IFPI)	1
UK Singles (Official Charts)	3
UK Airplay (Music Week)	14

=== Year-end charts ===
Chart (1996)	Position
Italy (Musica e dischi)	83
UK Singles (OCC)	97

== Certifications ==
Region	Certification	Certified units/sales
United Kingdom (BPI)	Silver	200,000^{^}
^{^} Shipments figures based on certification alone.

== Release history ==
Region	Date	Format(s)	Label(s)	Ref.
United Kingdom	18 November 1996	CD; cassette	RCA; BMG	
Japan	2 December 1996	CD	BMG	
