= Clementine (Mark Owen song) =

1997 single by Mark Owen

Single by Mark Owen

from the album Green Man
- B-side: "Child"; "Are You with Me" (live); "I Am What I Am" (live)
- Released: 3 February 1997
- Length: 3:56
- Label: RCA; BMG
- Songwriter: Mark Owen
- Producer: Craig Leon

Mark Owen singles chronology
"Child" (1996)	"Clementine" (1997)	"I Am What I Am" (1997)

"Clementine" is the second single released from Take That band member Mark Owen's debut solo album, Green Man (1996). The single was released on 3 February 1997 by RCA and BMG, and peaked at number three on the UK Singles Chart, matching the peak of his debut single, "Child".

== Track listings ==
- UK CD1
1. "Clementine" (remix)
2. "Clementine" (acoustic version)
3. "Child" (radio edit)
4. "Child" (acoustic version)
- UK CD2
1. "Clementine" (remix)
2. "Child" (live at Abbey Road)
3. "Are You with Me" (live at Abbey Road)
4. "I Am What I Am" (live at Abbey Road)
- UK cassette single
1. "Clementine" (remix)
2. "Child" (acoustic version)
- European CD single
1. "Clementine" (radio edit)
2. "Clementine" (acoustic version)
- Australian CD single
1. "Clementine" (radio edit)
2. "Clementine" (acoustic version)
3. "Child" (live at Abbey Road)
4. "I Am What I Am" (live at Abbey Road)
- Japanese CD single
1. "Clementine" (radio edit)
2. "Clementine" (acoustic version)
3. "Child" (live at Abbey Road)
4. "Are You with Me" (live at Abbey Road)
5. "I Am What I Am" (live at Abbey Road)

== Charts ==
=== Weekly charts ===
Chart (1997)	Peak position
Australia (ARIA)	51
Belgium (Ultratop 50 Flanders)	50
Belgium (Ultratop 50 Wallonia)	20
Estonia (Eesti Top 20)	9
Europe (Eurochart Hot 100)	28
Europe (European Hit Radio)	5
France Airplay (SNEP)	17
Germany (GfK)	52
Greece (IFPI Greece)	9
Iceland (Íslenski Listinn Topp 40)	24
Ireland (IRMA)	10
Israel (Israeli Singles Chart)	11
Italy (FIMI)	5
Italy Airplay (Music & Media)	5
Japan International (Oricon)	2
Latvia (Latvijas Top 40)	17
Lithuania (M-1)	4
Netherlands (Dutch Top 40 Tipparade)	13
Netherlands (Single Top 100)	49
Poland Airplay (Music & Media)	12
Scottish Singles Sales (Official Charts)	3
Spain (AFYVE)	2
Spain Airplay (Top 40 Radio)	12
Taiwan (IFPI Taiwan)	10
UK Singles (Official Charts)	3
UK Airplay (Music Week)	7

=== Year-end charts ===
Chart (1997)	Position
UK Singles (OCC)	131

== Release history ==
Region	Date	Format(s)	Label(s)	Ref.
United Kingdom	3 February 1997	CD; cassette	RCA; BMG	
Japan	21 February 1997	CD	RCA; BMG	
