= Quiet Heart =

Quiet Heart: The Best of the Go-Betweens

Compilation album by The Go-Betweens
- Released: 27 August 2012
- Genre: Alternative rock
- Label: EMI

The Go-Betweens chronology
Oceans Apart (2005)	Quiet Heart: The Best of the Go-Betweens (2012)

Quiet Heart: The Best of the Go-Betweens is a compilation album by Australian alternative rock band, the Go-Betweens. It peaked at No. 51 on the ARIA Albums, No. 48 on the ARIA Physical Albums, and No. 15 on the ARIA Australian Artists Albums charts. Ian Wallace of Australian Recording Industry Association (ARIA) described how, "[it] is the first collection that spans the band's entire recorded output... A second disc features a live recording from 1987."

The tracks were selected by original band members Robert Forster, Lindy Morrison, Robert Vickers and Amanda Brown after a "long and arduous process." Unlike previous compilations, the tracks covered their entire career including the reformation years – critics were split on whether the later era songs seemed out of place, but all appreciated how the tracks flowed especially the "conscious sequencing" contrasting early singles with latter reformation era tracks.

== Track listing ==
All songs by Grant McLennan and Robert Forster (except "Karen" and "People Say", which are by Forster.)

1. "Spring Rain" (1986) – 3:07
  - Originally released on Liberty Belle and the Black Diamond Express
2. "Love Goes On" (1988) – 3:21
  - Originally released on 16 Lovers Lane
3. "Bye Bye Pride" (1987) – 4:07
  - Originally released on Tallulah
4. "Part Company" (1984) – 4:53
  - Originally released on Spring Hill Fair
5. "Darlinghurst Nights" (2005) – 6:18
  - Originally released on Oceans Apart
6. "Bachelor Kisses" (1984) – 3:33
  - Originally released on Spring Hill Fair
7. "Surfing Magazines" (2000) – 4:34
  - Originally released on The Friends of Rachel Worth
8. "Karen" (1978) – 4:03
  - Originally released as a single
9. "The Clock" (2000) – 4:06
  - Originally released on The Friends of Rachel Worth
10. "Head Full of Steam" (1986) – 3:41
  - Originally released on Liberty Belle and the Black Diamond Express
11. "Streets of Your Town" (1988) – 3:39
  - Originally released on 16 Lovers Lane
12. "People Say" (1979) – 2:40
  - Originally released as a single
13. "Finding You" – 4:01
  - Originally released on Oceans Apart
14. "Dive for Your Memory" (1988) – 4:10
  - Originally released on 16 Lovers Lane
15. "Cattle and Cane" (1983) – 4:19
  - Originally released on Before Hollywood
16. "Right Here" (1987) – 3:52
  - Originally released on Tallulah
17. "Here Comes A City" – 3:25
  - Originally released on Oceans Apart
18. "Quiet Heart" (1988) – 5:21
  - Originally released on 16 Lovers Lane

=== 2nd disc Vienna Burns – Live 1987 ===
1. "Unkind and Unwise"
2. "Part Company"
3. "The House That Jack Kerouac Built"
4. "The Clarke Sisters"
5. "The Wrong Road"
6. "Cut It Out"
7. "Head Full of Steam"
8. "Right Here"
9. "In the Core of the Flame"
10. "Man O'Sand to Girl O'Sea"
11. "Spring Rain"
12. "Apology Accepted"
