= Bellavista Terrace: Best of The Go-Betweens =

Bellavista Terrace: The Best of The Go-Betweens

Compilation album by the Go-Betweens
- Released: 1999
- Genre: Alternative rock

The Go-Betweens chronology
1978–1990 (1990)	Bellavista Terrace: The Best of The Go-Betweens (1999)	78 'til 79 the Lost Album (1999)

Bellavista Terrace: Best of the Go-Betweens is a compilation album by Australian band the Go-Betweens.

Professional ratings
Review scores
Source	Rating
AllMusic	4.5/5 stars
The Encyclopedia of Popular Music	4/5 stars
The New Rolling Stone Album Guide	4/5 stars

== Track listing ==
(All songs by Grant McLennan and Robert Forster)

1. "Was There Anything I Could Do?" (1988) – 3:09
  - Originally released on 16 Lovers Lane
2. "Head Full of Steam" (1986) – 3:41
  - Originally released on Liberty Belle and the Black Diamond Express
3. "That Way" (1983) – 4:09
  - Originally released on Before Hollywood
4. "Part Company" (1984) – 4:53
  - Originally released on Spring Hill Fair
5. "Cattle and Cane" (1983) – 4:19
  - Originally released on Before Hollywood
6. "Draining the Pool for You" (1984) – 4:19
  - Originally released on Spring Hill Fair
7. "The Wrong Road" (1986) – 4:55
  - Originally released on Liberty Belle and the Black Diamond Express
8. "Bye Bye Pride" (1987) – 4:07
  - Originally released on Tallulah
9. "Man O'Sand to Girl O'Sea" (1983) – 3:27
  - Originally released as a single
10. "The House That Jack Kerouac Built" (1987) – 4:42
  - Originally released on Tallulah
11. "Bachelor Kisses" (1984) – 3:33
  - Originally released on Spring Hill Fair
12. "Streets of Your Town" (1988) – 3:39
  - Originally released on 16 Lovers Lane
13. "Spring Rain" (1986) – 3:07
  - Originally released on Liberty Belle and the Black Diamond Express
14. "Dive for Your Memory" (1988) – 4:10
  - Originally released on 16 Lovers Lane

== Charts ==
Chart (1999)	Peak position
Australian Albums (ARIA Charts)	58
