= 1978–1990 (Go-Betweens album) =

Compilation album by the Go-Betweens
- Released: 1990
- Recorded: 1978–1990
- Genre: Alternative rock
- Label: Beggars Banquet
- Producer: John Davies; The Go-Betweens; Tony Cohen; John Brand; Richard Preston; Graig Leon; Mark Wallis; Alex Fergusson; Dale Griffin

The Go-Betweens chronology
| The Able Label Singles (1986) | 1978–1990 (1990) | Bellavista Terrace: Best of The Go-Betweens (1999) |

Professional ratings
Review scores
| Source | Rating |
|---|---|
| AllMusic | 4.5/5 stars |
| Robert Christgau | A |

1978–1990 (sometimes The Go-Betweens 1978–1990) is a 1990 compilation album by Australian band the Go-Betweens. The album draws together music spanning the band's career from their beginnings in Brisbane to their 1989 breakup, including singles, B-sides, songs recorded for broadcast and previously unreleased material.

== Reception ==
Melody Maker said, "I find myself holding a package containing some of the most shockingly accurate songs about life and love I've ever heard. The fact the Go-Betweens never became massive is a disgusting injustice – but here's an opportunity to discover their dazzling brilliance." Robert Christgau said, "Half best-of, half collectorama, this gets you coming and going: you had no idea the album highlights would mesh into perfect pop, and you had no idea the 45-rpm obscurities would coalesce into imperfect pop."

NME noted the album "spans their age, from the curiously unhinged art-pop of two Brisbane beatniks with a Phil Ochs/Patti Smith/Lee Remick obsession, to the smooth, accomplished craft of their last album."

== Track listing ==
(All songs by Grant McLennan and Robert Forster)

1. "Karen" (1978) – 4:03 (Included on vinyl edition of album only)
  - Recorded May 1978, Brisbane. Originally released as a single.
2. "Hammer the Hammer" (1982) – 2:50
  - Recorded January 1982, Melbourne. Originally released as a single.
3. "Cattle and Cane" (1983) – 4:02
  - Recorded October 1982, Eastbourne. Originally released on Before Hollywood.
4. "Man O'Sand to Girl O'Sea" (1983) – 3:26
  - Recorded August 1983, Sussex. Originally released as a single.
5. "Bachelor Kisses" (1984) – 3:29
  - Recorded July 1984, London. Originally released on Spring Hill Fair.
6. "Draining the Pool For You" (1984) – 4:16
  - Recorded May 1984, France. Originally released on Spring Hill Fair.
7. "Spring Rain" (1986) – 3:06
  - Recorded November 1985, London. Originally released on Liberty Belle and the Black Diamond Express.
8. "The Clarke Sisters" (1987) – 3:17
  - Recorded January 1987, London. Originally released on Tallulah.
9. "Right Here" (1987) – 3:52
  - Recorded December 1986, London. Originally released on Tallulah.
10. "Bye Bye Pride" (1987) – 4:03
  - Recorded January 1987, London. Originally released on Tallulah.
11. "The House That Jack Kerouac Built" (1987) – 4:41
  - Recorded January 1987, London. Originally released on Tallulah.
12. "Streets of Your Town" (1988) – 3:34
  - Recorded May 1988, Sydney. Originally released on 16 Lovers Lane.
13. "Love is a Sign" (1988) – 4:13
  - Recorded May 1988, Sydney. Originally released on 16 Lovers Lane.
14. "8 Pictures" (1981) – 4:49 (Included on vinyl edition of album only)
  - Recorded July 1981, Melbourne. Originally released on Send Me A Lullaby.
15. "I Need Two Heads" (1980) – 2:33
  - Recorded April 1980, Scotland. Originally released as a single.
16. "When People Are Dead" (1987) – 4:29
  - Recorded January 1987, London. Originally released as a single B side.
17. "The Sound Of Rain" (1978) – 3:05 (Included on vinyl edition of album only)
  - Recorded November 1978, Brisbane. Previously unreleased.
18. "People Say" (1979) – 2:40
  - Recorded May 1978, Brisbane. Originally released as a single.
19. "World Weary (1981) – 1:41
  - Recorded April 1981, Sydney. Originally released as a single B side.
20. "Rock and Roll Friend" (1988) – 3:34
  - Recorded August 1988, London. Originally released as a single B side.
21. "Dusty In Here" (1983) – 4:10
  - Recorded August 1983, Eastbourne. Originally released on Before Hollywood.
22. "A King In Mirrors" (1984) – 2:58 (Included on vinyl edition of album only)
  - Recorded December 1983, London, for David Jensen Show.
23. "Second-Hand Furniture" (1984) – 4:13
  - Recorded October 1984, London, for John Peel Show.
24. "This Girl, Black Girl" (1983) – 2:31
  - Recorded August 1983, Sussex. Originally released as a single B side.
25. "Don't Call Me Gone" (1987) – 2:17
  - Recorded January 1987, London. Originally released as a single B side.
26. "Mexican Postcard" (1987) – 2:12 (Included on vinyl edition of album only)
  - Recorded August 1988, London. Originally released as a single B side.
27. "You Won't Find It Again" (1988) – 3:21
  - Recorded January 1988, Sydney. Previously unreleased.
