= The Evangelist (album) =

Studio album by Robert Forster
- Released: April 2008
- Recorded: September – November 2007, London
- Genre: Rock
- Label: YepRoc, Tuition Records
- Producer: Mark Wallis, Dave Ruffy

Robert Forster chronology
Intermission (2007)	The Evangelist (2008)	Songs to Play (2015)

The Evangelist is the fifth solo album by Australian singer-songwriter Robert Forster, released by YepRoc in 2008.

== Background ==
Following the 1989 break-up of the Go-Betweens, the band he had formed at college in 1978 with his friend Grant McLennan, Robert Forster embarked on a solo career, releasing four albums under his own name between 1990 and 1996. In 2000, the Go-Betweens reunited and went on to record the albums The Friends of Rachel Worth (2000), Bright Yellow Bright Orange (2003) and Oceans Apart (2005). After winning Best Adult Contemporary Album at the 2005 ARIA Music Awards for Oceans Apart, Forster and McLennan began working on the tenth Go-Betweens album and had started writing eight songs together. McLennan died of a heart attack in May 2006, and Forster began work on completing three of the songs they had started writing together. The first new song that Forster wrote for the Evangelist was its title track, which was written in one day in August 2006.

Forster and his former bandmates, bass player Adele Pickvance and drummer Glenn Thompson, travelled to London to record the album with producers Mark Wallis and Dave Ruffy in the same studio they used to record Oceans Apart. In the studio, the band set McLennan's guitar and amplifier up while they were recording. The band used a string quartet that featured three musicians, including Audrey Riley, that had previously played on the Go-Betweens' 1986 album Liberty Belle and the Black Diamond Express. The Evangelist was released on 4 April 2008 in mainland Europe, 21 April in the United Kingdom, 26 April in Australia and 29 April the United States.

== Reception ==
Professional ratings
Aggregate scores
Source	Rating
Metacritic	81/100
Review scores
Source	Rating
AllMusic	4/5 stars
The Guardian	3/5 stars
Mojo	3/5 stars
MSN Music (Consumer Guide)	A−
Pitchfork	7.6/10
PopMatters	6/10
Q	4/5 stars
Slant Magazine	4/5 stars
Time Out New York	4/5 stars
Uncut	5/5 stars

At Metacritic, which assigns a normalised rating out of 100 to reviews from mainstream critics, The Evangelist received an average score of 81, based on 11 reviews, indicating "universal acclaim". In his review for AllMusic, critic Thom Jurek said that the album contained "an abundance of brilliant, emotionally communicable and translatable, adult pop music" that was Forster's "most fully realized, seamless, and masterfully articulated solo record yet." Slant Magazine's Jonathan Keefe stated that The Evangelist "impresses as much for its craft as for the way it allows Forster to honor McLennan's passing even as it advances [Forster's] own work." In a less favourable review, Jude Rogers of The Guardian praised the opening tracks on the album but found that the other songs were "lacking in subtlety" and offered "too many bursts of light when you feel like more shade." Uncut reviewer Alastair McKay found it to be "more cohesive than any of Forster's other solo albums, and more moving." Joshua Klein of Pitchfork Media called it Forster's "warmest and most welcoming solo album" but said that it "feels a little incomplete." Mojo's Andy Fyfe called it "beautiful and heartfelt" while praising Forster for creating "some of the most direct songs he's ever written".

== Track listing ==
All songs written by Robert Forster, except where noted.

1. "If It Rains" – 3:47
2. "Demon Days" (Forster, Grant McLennan) – 3:40
3. "Pandanus" – 3:59
4. "Did She Overtake You" – 3:24
5. "The Evangelist" – 4:30
6. "Let Your Light In, Babe" (Forster, McLennan) – 4:44
7. "A Place to Hide Away" – 2:33
8. "Don't Touch Anything" – 4:09
9. "It Ain't Easy" (Forster, McLennan) – 3:29
10. "From Ghost Town" – 5:42

== Personnel ==
- Adele Pickvance – electric bass, contra bass, mandolin, found sounds, mini moog, vocals
- Glenn Thompson – drums, acoustic and electric guitar, vocals
- Robert Forster – vocals, acoustic, nylon and electric guitar, piano, casio, harmonica
- Seamus Beaghen – celeste, piano, Hammond organ, Fender Rhodes
- Gill Morley – violin
- Audrey Riley – cello
- Sue Dench – violin
- Chris Tombling – violin
- Greg Warren Wilson – violin
