= Caroline and I =

Single by the Go-Betweens

from the album Bright Yellow Bright Orange
- B-side: "Instant Replay"
- Released: 9 June 2003
- Recorded: August–September 2002
- Studio: Sing Sing, Melbourne; Paradise, Brisbane
- Genre: Pop rock; indie rock
- Length: 3:50
- Label: Trifekta
- Songwriter(s): Robert Forster; Grant McLennan
- Producer(s): The Go-Betweens

The Go-Betweens singles chronology
"Surfing Magazines" (2001)	"Caroline and I" (2003)	"Here Comes a City" (2005)

"Caroline and I" is a song by the Australian indie rock band the Go-Betweens that was released as the lead single from their eighth studio album Bright Yellow Bright Orange. It was released as a promotional CD single on the Circus Records label in the United Kingdom in February 2003 and by Trifekta Records in Australia on 9 June 2003.

== Reception ==
David Nichols in his book The Go-Betweens considers that "'Caroline and I' is a light engaging study of the rather vague parallels between Robert Forster and Princess Caroline of Monaco, with an irresistible melody line rather similar to that of the Buzzcocks' 'Paradise'." The book also contains an interview with Forster, in which he states that he wrote the song in 1997, when he was living in Germany, saying "She meant a lot to me when I was between the ages of about fifteen and nineteen. She was a glamour figure. Obviously, from the lyrics, she was the same age as me. She was someone I felt attracted to..." "...[Caroline] was my age. I was attracted to her, and it was like we were living these two parallel lives. She went to university at the same time as I did. I went to Queensland University, she went to a university in Paris. It seemed that we were moving in the same direction."

The Guardian's Betty Clarke comments "The heavy-hearted nostalgia of 'Caroline and I' is the song Lou Reed could have written if he had fallen for Brian Wilson, not David Bowie."

The Undercover Review believes that the song is "reminiscent of that sound that has buried them into the psyche of every underground lover in this country and abroad. Such simple melodies thrown together with also simple, yet thought-provoking lyrics is often shrugged off as easy to create, but in reality even the most hardened avoider of trends will find this hard to resist."

The Oz Music Project is not so complimentary however stating "the sinewy sunburst of Robert Forster's typically clean-channeled arpeggio riffs winding their way throughout, it is Forster-by-numbers; skewed, jangly pop with that wildly oscillating warble whorling around over the top. Like much of 'Rachel Worth' it lacks the invention and passion that made the Go-Betweens such a joy in the first place."

== Track listing ==
All tracks are written by Robert Forster, Grant McLennan except where shown.

No.	Title	Length
1.	"Caroline and I"	3:50
2.	"Instant Replay"	2:41
3.	"Taxi Taxee" (G. Thompson, D. McCormack)	3:02
4.	"Girl Lying on a Beach"	3:21
Total length:		12:59

All tracks are written by R. Forster, G. McLennan.

UK Promotional release
No.	Title	Length
1.	"Caroline and I"	3:50
2.	"Poison in the Wall"	4:26
Total length:		8:06

== Release history ==
Date	Region	Label	Format	Catalogue
February 2003	United Kingdom	Circus	CD single	
9 June 2003	Australia	Trifekta	CD single	HORSE029-2
9 June 2003	Europe	Clearspot	CD single	EFA CDM 60213
June 2003	United States	Jetset	CD single	

== Personnel ==
Go-Betweens

- Robert Forster – vocals, guitars
- Grant McLennan – vocals, guitars, bass
- Adele Pickvance – bass, keyboards, backing vocals
- Glenn Thompson – drums, backing vocals

Production

- Artwork – Cameron Bird
- Recording, mixing – Tim Whitten ("Caroline and I")
- Engineer – Chris ("Instant Replay", "Taxi Taxee", "Girly Lying on a Beach")
- Mastering – Don Bartley
- Producer – The Go-Betweens

== Charts ==
Chart performance for "Caroline and I"
Chart (2003)	Peak position
Australia (ARIA)	178
