= Going Blind (The Go-Betweens song) =

2000 single by Australian indie group

Single by The Go-Betweens

from the album The Friends of Rachel Worth
- A-side: "Going Blind"
- Released: September 2000
- Recorded: 9–22 February 2000; Jackpot Recording Studios; Portland, Oregon
- Genre: Pop rock; Indie rock
- Length: 2:55
- Label: Trifekta
- Songwriters: Robert Forster, Grant McLennan
- Producer: The Go-Betweens

The Go-Betweens singles chronology
"Streets of Your Town" (1989)	"Going Blind" (2000)	"Surfing Magazines" (2001)

"Going Blind" is a song by the Australian indie rock band The Go-Betweens that was released as the lead single from their seventh album The Friends of Rachel Worth. It was released as a CD single by W. Minc Records (the label of their former manager, Steve Miller) in Australia, on the Circus Records label in the United Kingdom and Jetset Records (for whom former band member, Robert Vickers, was the label's publicist) in the United States in September 2000. "Going Blind" was The Go-Betweens' first single since "Love Goes On" in 1989.

== Recording ==
The song was recorded during the recording sessions for The Friends of Rachel Worth at the Jackpot Recording Studios in Portland, Oregon. As the band's previous drummer, Glen Thompson, was unavailable they took up an offer from Sleater-Kinney's drummer, Janet Weiss, to fill in. Weiss' partner Sam Coomes (Quasi) was included on keyboards, together with the other members of Sleater-Kinney, Carrie Brownstein and Corin Tucker.

Brownstein commenting "I played guitar on 'Going Blind' and Corin sang on that song. I really had a good time but I was there so briefly that it was all work, I just went in and did it and left. My part on the records, which they loved - "Oh, that's perfect!" - that was so funny because basically what I did was listen to all my Go-Betweens records, and just write a Go-Betweens part. And they were like, "it's great!" I said "well thank, but that's because it's exactly what you do on your records.""

After recording the album, Forster and McLennan took the master tapes to Germany to mix them with Mario Thaler at Uphon Tonstudios in Wellheim. The album's sound engineer, Larry Crane, stating "I still don't enjoy the mixes for 'German Farmhouse' or 'Going Blind'; I think the vocals are too loud."

== Reception ==
Allmusic's Ned Raggett commented that "this Friends of Rachel Worth selection has its own brief (under three minutes) and gently active energy, reminiscent of solo songs like "Lighting Fires" as much as his band efforts. Janet Weiss's drumming shows why she was a fine choice to stand in for Lindy Morrison, adding both power and subtle grace in equal measure to the song, while her gentle backing vocals back McLennan's portrait of emotional bemusement just so. It doesn't stand forth and scream its genius, but then when did that ever describe the Go-Betweens anyway?"

Richard A. Martin in CMJ New Music Monthly stated, "the assertive, kind of jaunty single, 'Going Blind' ranks with 'Cattle and Cane' and other early favourites, an amazing feat for a band that skipped a decade."

Spin was not so complimentary, stating "in Thomas Pynchon's 1963 novel V. there's a character named Gouveneur 'Roony' Winsome, owner of Outlandish Records. If there ever was one single song designed to be released by that label, it would be this outlandishly winsome little pop tune from an 80's band that's as out of place as it is out of time. But then, if life was as excellent as Pynchon novels, sweet little nothing Go-Betweens would be stars."

== Track listing ==
All tracks are written by R. Forster, G. McLennan

No.	Title	Length
1.	"Going Blind"	2:55
2.	"Woman Across the Way"	2:55
3.	"The Locust Girls"	3:25
Total length:		9:15

== Release history ==
Date	Region	Label	Format	Catalogue
2000	Australia	W. Minc	CD single	8894282
2000	United Kingdom	Circus	CD single	CIRCUS CDS002
2000	Europe	Clearspot	CD single	CS 042
2000	United States	Jetset	CD single	TWA32CD

== Personnel ==
Go-Betweens

- Robert Forster – vocals, organ, guitar
- Grant McLennan – vocals, guitar
- Adele Pickvance – bass, backing vocals
- Janet Weiss – drums, backing vocals
- Sam Coomes - keyboards

Additional musicians

- Jen Chorowhas - violin
- Carrie Brownstein - guitar ("Going Blind")
- Corin Tucker - vocals ("Going Blind")

Production

- Artwork, Photography - Martin Schori
- Engineer – Larry Crane
- Mixing - Mario Thaler
- Producer - The Go-Betweens
