= I Love Myself =

I Love Myself may refer to:

- "I Love Myself", a 2019 song from Beauty Marks (album) by Ciara
- "I love myself", a phrase used in the chorus of the 2014 song "I" by Kendrick Lamar
- "I Love Myself (And I Always Have)", a 2015 song from Songs to Play by Robert Forster

== See also ==
- Self-care – Taking care of one's own health
- Self-love – Concept in philosophy and psychology
- Narcissism – Excessive preoccupation with oneself
