= Remain =

Remain may refer to:

- Remain (José González EP)
- Remain (KNK EP)
- Remain, poetry book by Jennifer Murphy, 2005
- Remain, album by Tyrone Wells, 2009
- Remain, album by Great Divide, 2002
- Remain, album by Them Are Us Too, 2015
- "Remain", song by Kubb, 2005
- "Remain", song by Upside Down
- "Remain", song by Robert Forster from Inferno
- Remain (film), an upcoming American film
- "Remain" (a member of the European Union), one of the two options available to voters in the 2016 United Kingdom European Union membership referendum
  - Remainer, a person holding that opinion
