= Finding You =

Finding You may refer to:

- "Finding You" (The Go-Betweens song), a single (2005)
- "Finding You", a single released by Australian singer Jack Vidgen (2012)
- "Finding You", a song by Kesha from Rainbow (2017)
- Finding You (film), a 2021 American coming-of-age comedy-drama film
