= Warm Nights (album) =

Studio album by Robert Forster
- Released: September 1996
- Recorded: January – February 1996, London
- Genre: Rock
- Length: 44:32
- Label: Beggars Banquet
- Producer: Edwyn Collins

Robert Forster chronology
I Had a New York Girlfriend (1995)	Warm Nights (1996)	Intermission (2007)

Professional ratings
Review scores
Source	Rating
AllMusic	3.5/5 stars
Melody Maker	(favorable)
NME	8/10
Q	3/5 stars

Warm Nights is the fourth album by Robert Forster. It was released on LP and CD by Beggars Banquet in 1996 and was highlighted with a new version of the Go-Betweens' "Rock 'n' Roll Friend", which was a single B-side in 1988.

Forster later said, "It was about sweaty Brisbane nights, banana trees in the backyard, animals walking around at night, fruitbats flying in the air. I was looking at Brisbane with new eyes in this new suburb, and I was listening to this music that had more space, more rhythm. I wrote all the songs in about eight months, quicker than I had written since the late 70s."

== Track listing ==
All songs written by Robert Forster, except where noted.

Side one

1. "I Can Do" – 3:00
2. "Warm Nights" – 4:25
3. "Cryin' Love" – 5:28
4. "Snake Skin Lady" – 3:35
5. "Loneliness" – 3:21

Side two

6. "Jug of Wine" – 6:03
7. "Fortress" – 4:57
8. "Rock 'n' Roll Friend" (Forster, Grant McLennan) – 5:13
9. "On a Street Corner" – 5:29
10. "I'll Jump" – 3:01

== Personnel ==
- Robert Forster – vocals, guitar
- Edwyn Collins – guitar
- Martin Drover – trumpet, flugelhorn
- Clare Kenny – bass
- Oliver Karus – cell
- Neil Pentelow – saxophone
- Dave Ruffy – drums
- J. Neil Sidwell – trombone
