= Was There Anything I Could Do? =

Single by The Go-Betweens

from the album 16 Lovers Lane
- A-side: "Was There Anything I Can Do?"
- B-side: "Rock and Roll Friend"
- Released: 3 October 1988
- Length: 3:06
- Label: Mushroom (AUS); Beggars Banquet (UK)
- Songwriters: Robert Forster, Grant McLennan
- Producer: Mark Wallis

The Go-Betweens singles chronology
"Streets of Your Town" (1988)	"Was There Anything I Could Do?" (1988)	"Love Goes On" (1988)

"Was There Anything I Could Do?" is a song by Australian indie group the Go-Betweens that was issued as the second single from their 1988 album 16 Lovers Lane. The song was released 3 October 1988 by Beggars Banquet Records in the UK and Mushroom Records in Australia but failed to chart in either region. It was released as a promotional single in the US by Capitol Records and charted on Billboard's Modern Rock Tracks charts in the United States, peaking at No. 16.

"Was There Anything I Could Do?" was not necessarily the unanimous choice by all members of the band, with claims by some that they wanted Forster's "Clouds" whilst McLennan pushed for the song as it was more driving and anthemic.

== Cover versions ==
The song was covered by Maxïmo Park and included on a limited edition compilation album, released in July 2008 to celebrate the launch of Independents Day.

In 2010 a cover of the song by the Buzzards, was included on a Go-Betweens tribute album, Right Here.

Franz Ferdinand in November 2013 covered the song on Triple J's Like a Version programme.

In 2014 a cover of the song by Missy Higgins was included on her album, Oz.

== Track listing ==
=== Original 7" Vinyl release ===
1. "Was There Anything I Could Do?" - 3:06
2. "Rock and Roll Friend" - 3:30

=== Original 12" Vinyl release ===
1. "Was There Anything I Can Do?" - 3:06
2. "Rock and Roll Friend" - 3:30
3. "Mexican Postcard" - 2:13

=== Original CD single release ===
1. "Was There Anything I Can Do?" - 3:06
2. "Rock and Roll Friend" - 3:30
3. "Mexican Postcard" - 2:13
4. "Bye Bye Pride" - 4:06

== Release history ==
Region	Date	Label	Format	Catalogue
United Kingdom	October 1988	Beggars Banquet	7" vinyl	BEG 219
United Kingdom	October 1988	Beggars Banquet	12" vinyl	BEG 219T
United Kingdom	October 1988	Beggars Banquet	CD single	BEG 219CD
Australia	December 1988	Mushroom	7" vinyl	K698
Australia	December 1988	Mushroom	12" vinyl	X14667
United States	1988	Capitol	12" vinyl	SPRO-79427^{[A]}

== Notes ==
A.:The US release was a 12" promotional release with "Was There Anything I Could Do?" on each side.

== Charts ==
Chart (1988–89)	Peak position
Australia (ARIA)	159
US Alternative Airplay (Billboard)	16
