= I Had a New York Girlfriend =

Studio album by Robert Forster
- Released: October 25, 1994
- Recorded: 1994, Sing Sing and Fortissimo studios, Melbourne, Australia
- Genre: Rock
- Length: 38:42
- Label: Beggars Banquet
- Producer: Robert Forster

Robert Forster chronology
Calling from a Country Phone (1993)	I Had a New York Girlfriend (1994)	Warm Nights (1996)

Professional ratings
Review scores
Source	Rating
AllMusic	3.5/5 stars
Robert Christgau	(1-star Honorable Mention)

I Had a New York Girlfriend is the third album by Robert Forster, released in 1994 on Beggar's Banquet. It consists of cover versions of his favourite songs and unlike his previous albums contains no original compositions.

The album was reissued in 2024 as Beautiful Hearts (the album's original working title) on the Needle Mythology label.

== Critical reception ==
Trouser Press called the collection "quirky enough to maintain a distinctly confessional quality."

== Track listing ==
Side one

1. "Nature's Way" (Randy California) – 2:25
2. "Broken Hearted People" (Guy Clark) – 3:47
3. "Echo Beach" (Mark Gane) – 2:53
4. "Tell Me That It Isn't True" (Bob Dylan) – 2:36
5. "2541" (Grant Hart) – 3:46
6. "Anytime" (Rick Nelson) – 3:55

Side two

7. "Locked Away" (Steve Jordan, Keith Richards) – 3:27
8. "Look Out (Here Comes Tomorrow)" (Neil Diamond) – 2:49
9. "Alone" (Tom Kelly, Billy Steinberg) – 3:12
10. "Bird" (Michael Hansonis) – 4:47
11. "Frisco Depot" (Mickey Newbury) – 2:36
12. "3 A.M." (Bill Anderson, Jerry Todd) – 2:29

== Personnel ==
- Robert Forster – guitar, vocals, handclaps
- Suzy Ahearn – backing vocals
- Gordy Blair – bass
- Warren Ellis – violin
- Dave Graney – growl
- Mark C. Halstead – backing vocals
- Mick Harvey – bass, guitar, backing vocals
- Rod Hayward – guitar
- Graham Lee – pedal steel, backing vocals
- Clare Moore – drums, backing vocals, handclaps
- Charlie Owen – guitar, dobro
- Andy Parsons – backing vocals
- Conway Savage – organ, piano, backing vocals, handclaps
- Rob Snarski – backing vocals
