= The Candle and the Flame =

Studio album by Robert Forster
- Released: 3 February 2023
- Studio: Alchemix Studios, Brisbane
- Genre: Folk-pop
- Length: 37:03
- Label: Tapete

Robert Forster chronology
Inferno (2019)	The Candle and the Flame (2023)

The Candle and the Flame is the eighth solo album by Australian singer-songwriter Robert Forster, released by Tapete Records on 3 February 2023. It reached number 32 in the German charts.

== Details ==
In 2021, during the COVID-19 pandemic, Forster's wife, Karin Bäumler, was diagnosed with stage four inoperable ovarian cancer. While Baumler was undergoing chemotherapy treatment, Forster's mother died at the age of 94. Forster said, "I take solace from the fact she lived a long, happy life. My father died at 87. These are the kind of ages Karin and I are reaching for."

Although many of the lyrics could appear to relate to Bäumler's illness, only one, "She's a Fighter", was written after the diagnosis. Forster said, "Karin talked of fighting for her health and a path through chemotherapy to recovery. The phrase came to me, and I knew immediately that it would work with my new melody. I needed just one other line for the lyric: 'Fighting for good'. The song was finished. I had written my first two-line song. I had just out-Ramoned the Ramones!" Elsewhere, he declared it, "The best six words I have ever written." Bäumler, a violinist, played xylophone on the track as it was the only instrument she felt strong enough to play. "Music was a refuge. It was like taking an amnesia tablet." she said. They were joined on the recording by their children, Loretta and Louis Forster (a former member of the Goon Sax).

Others to appear on the album included Adele Pickvance, a former member of the Go-Betweens, and Luke McDonald and Scott Bromiley of the John Steel Singers. With Bäumler unable to play her usual instrument, her violin teacher, Christine Dunaway, filled her role.

== Reception ==
According to the review aggregator Metacritic, The Candle and the Flame received "universal acclaim" based on a weighted average score of 86 out of 100 from 8 critic scores.

The Guardian wrote, "The shadow of mortality hangs over The Candle and the Flame. It is startling in its intimacy and quiet power. But it is ultimately life-affirming. It's not very rock'n'roll. It's a lot more interesting and enduring than that." Pitchfork wrote, "Forster has recorded a hangout album—with the people he actually hangs out with. The songs sound as fresh as morning air through open kitchen windows. it stands out because simpatico players have kicked around and toughened up the fuller, thicker-bodied ruminations."

Uncut called the album a "freewheeling folk-pop wonder", noting Forster was "jettisoning ornamentation in pursuit of the raw fundaments".

== Track listing ==
All songs written by Robert Forster.

No.	Title	Length
1.	"She's a Fighter"	2:13
2.	"Tender Years"	5:28
3.	"It's Only Poison"	4:35
4.	"The Roads"	5:05
5.	"I Don't Do Drugs I Do Time"	4:47
6.	"Always"	4:06
7.	"There's a Reason to Live"	2:35
8.	"Go Free"	3:23
9.	"When I Was a Young Man"	4:51
Total length:		37:03

== Personnel ==
- Robert Forster – acoustic guitar, vocals
- Louis Forster – bass, acoustic guitar, electric guitar, percussion, vocals, toy piano
- Adele Pickvance – bass, congas (tracks 3, 5 and 6)
- Luke McDonald – bass, vocals, piano, electric guitar (tracks 2, 4, 6 and 8)
- James Harrison – cello (track 4)
- Tony McCall – drums (tracks 6 and 8)
- Scott Bromiley – drums, organ, acoustic guitar, vocals (track 2)
- Loretta Forster – electric Guitar, vocals (tracks 1 and 8)
- Chrissy Dunaway Reilly – violin (track 4)
- Karin Bäumler – xylophone, vocals (tracks 1, 3, 5, 6 and 8)

=== Recording ===
- Jason Mitchell – mastering
- Victor Van Vugt – mixing
- Marly Luske – recording

== Charts ==
Chart performance for The Candle and the Flame
Chart (2023)	Peak position
German Albums (Offizielle Top 100)	32
