= Love Goes On (song) =

Single by The Go-Betweens

from the album 16 Lovers Lane
- A-side: "Love Goes On"
- B-side: "Clouds"
- Released: January 1989
- Recorded: April 1988
- Length: 3:20
- Label: Beggars Banquet
- Songwriters: Robert Forster, Grant McLennan
- Producer: Mark Wallis

The Go-Betweens singles chronology
"Was There Anything I Could Do?" (1988)	"Love Goes On" (1989)	"Going Blind" (2000)

"Love Goes On" is a song by the Australian indie rock group The Go-Betweens, issued as the third and final single from their 1988 album 16 Lovers Lane. The song was released in January 1989 by Beggars Banquet Records in the UK, with "Clouds" as the B-side. "Love Goes On" was the last single issued by the band before their split in December 1989.

== Reception ==
Thom Jurek in his review of 16 Lovers Lane at AllMusic describes the song as setting the stage "for a kind of refined yet primal emotional transference that pop music is rarely capable of revealing." "As he [McLennan] sings... ...the doorway to the heart and its secrets opens. In the grain of his voice lie the flowers in the dustbin whose names are desperation and affirmation. With its hyperactive acoustic guitars, Amanda Brown's cooing string arrangements, and the deftly layered, subtly played brass instruments, the tune becomes a gauzy anthem; it celebrates the ravaged heart as a beacon of strained hope in the entryway to a hall of bewilderment."

In the book, Lost in the Grooves: Scram's Capricious Guide to the Music You Missed, it states that "'Love Goes On' is either a literal story of obsession or a metaphor for the transitory nature of love, driven by a cheery electric guitar line and a Spanish guitar break over strings, synths and God knows how many other instruments."

== Track listing ==
=== 7" Vinyl release ===
All tracks are written by R. Forster, G. McLennan

No.	Title	Length
1.	"Love Goes On"	3:20
2.	"Clouds"	4:00

== Release history ==
Date	Region	Label	Format	Catalogue
January 1989	United Kingdom	Beggars Banquet	7" vinyl	BEG 225
1989	Spain	Beggars Banquet/Victoria	7" vinyl	VIC 359

== Credits ==
The Go-Betweens

- Amanda Brown – violin, oboe, guitar, vocals
- Robert Forster – vocals, rhythm guitar, harmonica
- Grant McLennan – vocals, lead guitar
- Lindy Morrison – drums
- John Willsteed – bass guitar, guitar, Hammond organ, piano

Production

- Mixing — Tony Visconti ("Love Goes On")
- Producer — Mark Wallis
