= Calling from a Country Phone =

Studio album by Robert Forster
- Released: 24 October 1993
- Recorded: Sunshine Studios, Brisbane, Australia
- Genre: Rock
- Length: 38:14
- Label: Beggars Banquet
- Producer: Robert Forster

Robert Forster chronology
Danger in the Past (1990)	Calling from a Country Phone (1993)	I Had a New York Girlfriend (1995)

Calling from a Country Phone is the second album by former Go-Between Robert Forster, and his first self-produced disc. Drummer Glenn Thompson would later join Forster and Grant McLennan in a reformed Go-Betweens years later. The album also features Custard frontman David McCormack on lead guitar.

== Details ==
Forster had recently returned to Australia from Germany. "I came back with an agenda, because I had an album written. I wanted to come back and find some musicians in Brisbane, and I wanted to record it probably at Sunshine. There wasn't a better studio in town."

Forster was unsure where to find local musicians. He said, "So I went to the one place in Brisbane where, if you’re a little bit disoriented, you’re looking for information, you’re looking for people – there’s only one place you can go. So I walked into Rockinghorse Records, and I said to Warwick Vere – who’s run the shop since 1975 – 'I need a band. I need some young musicians around town.' He told me to go to the Queens Arms on a Sunday night, down there on James Street. I walked in and there was a band on stage called COW. " COW (Country or Western) were a Bob Moore band that featured Dave McCormack from Custard and future member of the Go-Betweens and Custard, Glenn Thompson. As Forster's backing band, they toured under the name the Silver Backwash.

COW had never recorded an album before, and Thompson said the practice before entering the studio was, "relentless - he had a real holistic idea of what he wanted.

== Reception ==
Lisa Kearns, writing in the Melbourne Age of Forster’s ‘idiosyncratic brilliance’, praised the album as a ‘softly glowing, moody, and many-faceted concoction that gathers memories from the years Forster spent travelling the globe, from Los Angeles to Berlin.’

Andrew Stafford, in Pig City, said it was "perhaps Robert Forster's most full realised work. Where Danger in the Past was brooding, even solemn, [this] was bright and optimistic. The addition of boogie-woogie piano, violin and pedal steel also lent the music a certain grandeur."

Professional ratings
Review scores
Source	Rating
Allmusic	link

== Track listing ==
All songs written by Robert Forster.

1. "Atlanta Lie Low" – 3:13
2. "121" – 3:28
3. "The Circle" – 3:45
4. "Falling Star" – 4:05
5. "I Want to Be Quiet" – 3:34
6. "Cat's Life" – 3:52
7. "Girl to a World" – 4:18
8. "Drop" – 4:08
9. "Beyond Their Law" – 5:03
10. "Forever & Time" – 2:48

== Personnel ==
- Robert Forster – guitar, vocals
- John Bone – violin, piano, organ
- David McCormack – guitar
- Robert Moore – bass
- Dallas Southam – pedal steel, acoustic guitar
- Glenn Thompson – drums
