= Hammer the Hammer =

Single by The Go-Betweens
- A-side: "Hammer the Hammer"
- B-side: "By Chance"
- Released: June 1982
- Recorded: January 1982; A.A.V. Studios, Melbourne
- Length: 2:50
- Label: Rough Trade
- Songwriter: Grant McLennan
- Producer: Tony Cohen

The Go-Betweens singles chronology
"Your Turn, My Turn" (1981)	"Hammer the Hammer" (1982)	"Cattle and Cane" (1983)

"Hammer the Hammer" was released as a stand-alone single by Australian indie group The Go-Betweens. It was released as a 7" vinyl record on the Missing Link Records label in Australia in June 1982 and by Rough Trade Records in the United Kingdom in July, with "By Chance" as the B-side. Forster considered that "By Chance" was a personal break-through for him. Pitchfork Media describes "By Chance" as sounding "more than a bit like the early Smiths.

== Details ==
According to music journalist Clinton Walker "Hammer the Hammer" was about McLennan's growing taste for narcotics encouraged by a proximity to the Birthday Party. McLennan however denied that the song was about drugs and in the liner notes for the band's compilation album, 1978-1990, he describes it as being "an incomplete meditation on loneliness and violence, sometimes mistakenly thought to be about drugs".

Forster described the song as, "Grant's first great pop tune. An urgent, melodic verse, a foot to the floor chorus - its lyric just the repeated title. Perfect. From his earliest songs I found his lyrics surprisingly oblique and melancholic."

The band recorded the two songs at Armstrong's Audio Visual (A.A.V.) Studios in Melbourne, at the same time as The Birthday Party was recording Junkyard. It was during these sessions that the two groups decided to collaborate on a song. The result, "After the Fireworks", was a Forster/McLennan joint composition with the lyrics by Nick Cave. It was subsequently released by on Au Go Go Records (ANDA-22) under the name Tuff Monks.

== Reception ==
Reviewed in NME at the time of release, it was described as, "Miscreant pop music attempting to disgrace its fealty to any number of sources. It seems to stumble when a stride is called for and winds up notating needless obscurities. Vacancy trussed up as abstraction is not the stuff of success, in any sense."

The Guardian describes the song as an "odd, punkish sort of folk rock, deceptively primitive and sometimes rattlingly suggestive of the Velvet Underground."

== Track listing ==
=== Original 7" Vinyl release ===
No.	Title	Writer(s)	Length
1.	"Hammer the Hammer"	G. McLennan	2:50
2.	"By Chance"	R. Forster	2:30

== Release history ==
Date	Region	Label	Format	Catalogue
June 1982	Australia	Missing Link	7" vinyl	MISS 33
July 1982	United Kingdom	Rough Trade	7" vinyl	RT 108

== Credits ==
The Go-Betweens

- Robert Forster – vocals, rhythm guitar
- Grant McLennan – vocals, bass guitar, lead guitar
- Lindy Morrison – drums, vocals

Production

- Producer, Engineer — Tony Cohen
- Producer — The Go-Betweens
