= Inferno (Robert Forster album) =

Studio album by Robert Forster
- Released: 1 March 2019
- Genre: Rock, pop rock
- Label: Tapete
- Producer: Victor Van Vugt

Robert Forster chronology
Songs to Play (2015)	Inferno (2019)	The Candle and the Flame (2023)

Inferno is the seventh solo album by Australian singer-songwriter Robert Forster, released by Tapete Records in 2019. It reached number 17 in the German charts and 24 in Scotland.

== Details ==
Forster said, "I had nine songs I believed in, and I wanted to take them out of hometown Brisbane and record them somewhere else. Somewhere exotic. And producer/engineer Victor Van Vugt had a studio in Berlin. Perfect. The album title relates to Brisbane, as the summers are getting brutal hot. Inferno fits that and the fevered mood of the LP." Van Vugt had been engineer on Forster's solo debut, Danger in the Past. Forster said, "There's a certain grandness to what he does, and a space, and I wanted to put the songs in that. He immediately injects mood."

The song "Crazy Jane on the Day of Judgement" is an adaptation of the poem with the same name by W. B. Yeats. Forster first played it in Dublin in 2013, on the 150th anniversary of Yeats' birth.

"I'm Gonna Tell It" had been written in 2007 and left off the previous two albums. Forster said, "Grant had died about a year and a half before and I’d just come through the hepatitis C treatment, which hadn’t worked. So there was a lot of new information that was going to come out, and that I was going to be questioned about. That then fed into the writing of Grant & I — so the song almost foretold the book, in a way."

== Reception ==
Professional ratings
Review scores
Source	Rating
The Guardian	4/5 stars
The Irish Times	5/5 stars
Pitchfork	7.7/10
Record Collector	4/5 stars
Vice (Expert Witness)	B+

Record Collector said, "Inferno primarily concentrates on the erudite, high-calibre guitar pop we’ve long since associated with Robert Forster. It's hardly revolutionary, but it's revelatory, nonetheless. In fact, after all these years, it lifts the heart to hear him sounding so exhilarated on the hard-rocking 'Inferno (Brisbane In Summer)'", but also noted it was unlikely to find him any mainstream acceptance.

Uncut declared, "Greatest living Australian returns," and said, "his antic muse is too skewiff to stay sober for long, and the best moments on Inferno are hymns to everyday pleasures." Mojo noted, "this is a slim volume rather than a blockbuster epic, but one exquisitely presented and rendered in the kind of creamy white clarity that will not yellow or crack. The natural timbres of live players are captured with intimacy and warmth." Pitchfork noted, "The rest of the band, dubbed by Forster the Magic Five, go tight or loose as the material requires, a marriage adapting to the times".

The Guardian said, "He's very much an acquired taste, but lyric-driven songs that seem tuneless on the surface are the ones you find yourself humming later. And the ones that seem most banal, like "The Morning", have a wisdom that hits you later. He knows what he does is good without needing the validation of others." Tony Clayton-Lea, in The Irish Times, noted, "For an album that lasts a mere 35 minutes, a lot is packed into it – a few generations' worth, in fact. Aligning the confessional lyrics with music that is shrewdly textured and nonchalantly performed, Forster achieves what is, to date, a personal best."

== Track listing ==
All songs written by Robert Forster (except #1 with words by William Butler Yeats)

No.	Title	Length
1.	"Crazy Jane on the Day of Judgement"	4:41
2.	"No Fame"	4:28
3.	"Inferno (Brisbane in Summer)"	2:45
4.	"The Morning"	4:14
5.	"Life Has Turned a Page"	4:44
6.	"Remain"	2:55
7.	"I'll Look After You"	3:13
8.	"I'm Gonna Tell It"	2:45
9.	"One Bird in the Sky"	5:14

== Personnel ==
'The Magic Five' (as credited on back cover):

- Robert Forster – vocals, electric and acoustic guitar
- Scott Bromiley – bass, electric and nylon string guitar, synthesiser, organ, vocals
- Earl Harvin (as 'Earl Havin') – drums, bongos
- Michael Mühlhaus – Bösendorfer piano, Fender Rhodes
- Karin Bäumler – violin, glockenspiel, vocals

== Charts ==
Chart (2019)	Peak position
German Albums (Offizielle Top 100)	17
Scottish Albums (OCC)	24
Portuguese Albums (AFP)	50
UK Independent Albums (OCC)	16
