= Head Full of Steam =

Single by the Go-Betweens

from the album Liberty Belle and the Black Diamond Express
- A-side: "Head Full of Steam"
- B-side: "Don't Let Him Come Back"
- Released: May 1986
- Recorded: Berry Street, London
- Genre: Jangle pop; indie pop
- Length: 3:35
- Label: Beggars Banquet (UK); True Tone (AUS)
- Songwriters: Grant McLennan; Robert Forster
- Producer: Richard Preston

The Go-Betweens singles chronology
"Spring Rain" (1986)	"Head Full of Steam" (1986)	"Right Here" (1987)

"Head Full of Steam" is a song by the Australian alternative rock band the Go-Betweens that was released as the second single from their fourth album Liberty Belle and the Black Diamond Express. It was released as a 7-inch and 12-inch vinyl single on the Beggars Banquet label in the United Kingdom in May 1986, with "Don't Let Him Come Back" as the B-side. In Australia it was released in 1987 by True Tone Records, with "Little Joe" as the B-Side.

The single version is markedly different from the album recording, with added keyboards, and a middle eighth where Forster asks, "Can I come to your place, and can I wash your hair?"

== Video ==
The video was a take-off of Prince's recent video for "Kiss". It featured the Go-Betweens' co-founders Robert Forster cavorting in a mid-riff top and flares and Grant McLennan in drag. Forster later wrote that, "This was weird and gave the video an odd edge. I didn't know what Grant was thinking. A team of psychologists at a lakeside retreat outside Vienna would have to work that one out."

== Critical reception ==
Ned Raggett at AllMusic states "'Head Full of Steam' finds the band in relatively jangly mode, the sparkling chime of Robert Forster's and Grant McLennan's guitars almost as close as they ever got to being like the Cocteau Twins. It's an inexact comparison admittedly—there's not any digital delay soundscapes for a start! -- while the steady, fairly relaxed pace of the song and its melody found the band in easy rather than tense, concerned mode. Forster himself is in fine form vocally, his particular plaintive style just nervously worried enough to convey his unsuccessful-but-he'll-try-anyway pursuit of an unrequited love. Thorn's singing is understated but adds a nice bit of low-key contrast and flair."

In Jason McNeil's review of Liberty Belle and the Black Diamond Express in PopMatters, he states the "lone drawback might be the laissez faire attitude on "Head Full of Steam", a track whose title misrepresents it totally." Alternately, The Guardian thought, "Its softer, janglepop sound showed that shifting towards simplification could work in their favour."

Treblezine's Jeff Terich states that it is "another song that bears similarities to The Smiths. But it's Grant McLennan's voice that gives it away each time. Sounding like a cross between Robyn Hitchcock and Tom Verlaine, his voice is no less unmistakable than Morrissey's."

Australian musician David McCormack (Custard) believes that "It's a classic. It's mysterious but it's got such a great euphoric chorus. My fascination with this particular song is also about when I discovered it – whenever I put it on, it transports me back to Brisbane in the mid-80s, which is where I first heard it at a friend's house. I also recommend checking out the video which features Robert doing his best Prince impersonation."

== Track listing ==
=== Original 7-inch vinyl release ===
All tracks are written by G. McLennan and R. Forster.

No.	Title	Length
1.	"Head Full of Steam" (Remix)	3:35
2.	"Don't Let Him Come Back"	2:30

=== Original 12-inch vinyl release ===
All tracks are written by G. McLennan and R. Forster.

No.	Title	Length
1.	"Head Full of Steam" (Remix)	3:35
2.	"Don't Let Him Come Back"	2:30
3.	"The Wrong Road" (Early Version)

== Release history ==
Region	Date	Label	Format	Catalogue
United Kingdom	May 1986	Beggars Banquet	7-inch vinyl	BEG 159
United Kingdom	May 1986	Beggars Banquet	12-inch vinyl	BEG 159T
Australia	1986	True Tone	7-inch vinyl	884 809-7

== Credits ==
The Go-Betweens

- Grant McLennan — vocals, lead guitar, loops, treatments
- Lindy Morrison — drums
- Robert Forster — vocals, rhythm guitar
- Robert Vickers — bass guitar

Additional musicians

- Tracey Thorn — backing vocals ("Head Full of Steam")
- Dean B Speedwell — keyboards ("Don't Let Him Come Back")

Production

- Producer — The Go-Betweens, Richard Preston
- Artwork — Mick Lowe
- Remix — Mike Pela
