= Bright Yellow Bright Orange =

Studio album by the Go-Betweens
- Released: February 2003
- Recorded: August–September 2002
- Studios: Sing Sing, Melbourne; Paradise, Sydney
- Genre: Indie rock
- Labels: Trifekta (Australia); Circus (UK); Clearspot (Germany); Jetset (US); Wonderground (Japan)

The Go-Betweens chronology
The Friends of Rachel Worth (2000)	Bright Yellow Bright Orange (2003)	Oceans Apart (2005)

Singles from Bright Yellow Bright Orange
- 1. "Caroline and I" Released: June 2003

Professional ratings
Aggregate scores
Source	Rating
Metacritic	82/100
Review scores
Source	Rating
AllMusic	4/5 stars
Blender	4/5 stars
Entertainment Weekly	B+
The Guardian	5/5 stars
Pitchfork	6.9/10
Q	4/5 stars
Rolling Stone	3/5 stars
Spin	A−
Uncut	4/5 stars
The Village Voice	B+

Bright Yellow Bright Orange is the eighth studio album by Australian indie rock group the Go-Betweens, released in February 2003 on the Trifekta record label. It was nominated at the 2003 ARIA Music Awards for Best Adult Contemporary Album, but lost to John Farnham for The Last Time.

== Track listing ==
All tracks are written by Grant McLennan, Robert Forster.

No.	Title	Length
1.	"Caroline and I"	3:50
2.	"Poison in the Walls"	4:26
3.	"Mrs Morgan"	4:07
4.	"In Her Diary"	3:00
5.	"Too Much of One Thing"	5:53
6.	"Crooked Lines"	2:49
7.	"Old Mexico"	4:39
8.	"Make Her Day"	3:44
9.	"Something for Myself"	4:01
10.	"Unfinished Business"	2:12

The first pressing of the Jetset version of the CD, that was available in some US stores, included a bonus disk.

Jetset bonus disk
No.	Title	Length
1.	"Instant Replay"	2:42
2.	"Woman Across The Way"	2:54
3.	"Locust Girls"	3:25
4.	"Girl Lying On A Beach"	3:22

== Personnel ==
- Robert Forster – vocals, electric and acoustic guitar, slide, Hammond organ, piano
- Grant McLennan – vocals, electric and acoustic guitar
- Adele Pickvance – electric and upright bass, keyboards, vocals
- Glenn Thompson – drums, electric guitar, Farfisa organ, keyboards, vocals
- Hope Csutoros – violin
- Helen Mountfort – cello
- David Chesworth – string arrangement
