= Songs to Play =

Studio album by Robert Forster
- Released: 18 September 2015
- Recorded: Wild Mountain Sound Studio, Mount Nebo
- Genre: Rock
- Labels: Universal Music Australia, Tapete Records
- Producers: Luke McDonald, Robert Forster, Scott Bromiley

Robert Forster chronology
The Evangelist (2008)	Songs to Play (2015)	Inferno (2019)

Songs to Play is the sixth solo album by Australian singer-songwriter Robert Forster, released by Universal Music Australia in 2015. It peaked in the lower reaches of the German and Austrian charts. It was nominated at the 2016 ARIA Music Awards for Best Adult Contemporary Album, but lost to Bernard Fanning for Civil Dusk.

== Details ==
Scott Bromiley and Luke McDonald of the band The John Steel Singers played many instruments on the album and were also credited as co-producers. Forster had previously produced their debut album, Tangalooma. Forster said, "from very early on I wanted to work with Scott and Luke from The John Steel Singers. I had most of the album written by about 2010 or 2011, and I had them over to the house and I just said, 'Look, I'd love to work with you on the next album, and you take the songs where you want to take them. I'm not just having you over here to play bass and guitar — go with it. Bring your sensibility into the songs and we can work together on them.'"

It was also the first of Forster's album's to feature a strong contribution from his wife, Karin Bäumler, something they had wanted to do for some time.

Forster was insistent that the recording be analogue. Forster claimed, "that was very, very important. I didn't want a screen. I wanted the musicians to play in a room and then come back inside and not stare at a screen. I wanted that atmosphere, I wanted that openness in the studio. And I like the sound of analogue as well." The album was recorded at Wild Mountain Sound, about a half-hour drive from Forster's home. Forster said, "The recording budget was lower than anything I have ever done and I found that liberating. You find another way to work. I had the feeling, I can do whatever I want." Twelve songs were recorded, with two omitted and intended for future release.

== Reception ==
Professional ratings
Aggregate scores
Source	Rating
Metacritic	79/100
Review scores
Source	Rating
AllMusic	4/5 stars
The Guardian	4/5 stars
PopMatters	7/10 stars

Songs to Play reached number 57 in the Austrian charts and 60 in Germany.

At Metacritic, which assigns a normalised rating out of 100 to reviews from mainstream critics, Songs to Play received an average score of 79, based on 11 reviews, indicating "generally favorable reviews".

The Guardian said listeners should "imagine Reed narrating a Talking Heads album (it could be 77 or True Stories) and you’re getting close to the feeling of Songs To Play. For all its antecedents, though, Songs To Play is Robert Forster at his most singular. It's the sound of Forster starting anew, and the spring in his step is welcome."

An AllMusic review stated "these songs are direct and kinetic, full of hooks, rich in metaphors and irony, and a sleight-of-hand confessionalism. Though rock & roll riffs are in your face, the quirky pop spirit of the Go-Betweens is never far away." The review noted the debt owed to The Velvet Underground, and also said, " these spirited, well-crafted songs offer rock & roll in a manner he's never even hinted at before."

PopMatters said it "needs to be acknowledged as an album from a unique songwriter who just so happened to catch his sound so damn well that it makes a strong case for Forster’s artistic life beyond the Go-Betweens." Uncut called it "strikingly immediate, yet also rewarding repeated immersion. The 10 tracks here are, just as Forster intended, amusing, infectious and relaxed."

Luke Haines said, "The real joy of this album is the newness of it all. Robert sounds so agog with the possibilities that life has to offer that it’s as if he’s just discovered the sheer genius of the greatest art form of the modern age — that’s rock & roll — for the first time. So wake up and smell the coffee, babe, take in the sunlight, put on Songs to Play and surrender to genius."

== Track listing ==
All songs written by Robert Forster

No.	Title	Length
1.	"Learn to Burn"	4:35
2.	"Let Me Imagine You"	3:07
3.	"Songwriters On The Run"	3:16
4.	"And I Knew"	3:04
5.	"A Poet Walks"	4:59
6.	"I'm So Happy For You"	3:50
7.	"Love Is Where It Is"	3:51
8.	"Turn On The Rain"	3:04
9.	"I Love Myself (And I Always Have)"	3:35
10.	"Disaster In Motion"	5:55

== Personnel ==
- Robert Forster - vocals, guitar
- Scott Bromiley - guitar, keyboards, bass, backing vocals
- Luke McDonald - bass, guitar, keyboards, backing vocals, sitar
- Matt Piele - drums, bongos
- Karin Bäumler - violin, backing vocals

Guest Players

- Louis Forster - guitar ("Learn to Burn")
- Ric Trevaskes - backing vocals
