= Man O'Sand to Girl O'Sea =

Single by The Go-Betweens
- B-side: "This Girl, Black Girl"
- Released: October 1983
- Recorded: August 1983
- Genre: Jangle pop; indie pop
- Length: 3:25
- Label: Rough Trade
- Songwriter: Robert Forster
- Producer: John Brand

The Go-Betweens singles chronology
"Cattle and Cane" (1983)	"Man O'Sand to Girl O'Sea" (1983)	"Part Company" (1984)

"Man O'Sand to Girl O'Sea" was originally released as a stand-alone single by Australian indie group The Go-Betweens. It was released as a 7" vinyl record on the Rough Trade Records label in the United Kingdom in October 1983, with "This Girl, Black Girl" as the B-side. It reached No. 24 on the UK Independent Singles Chart. Another recording of the song was included as the final track on the band's 1984 album, Spring Hill Fair.

== Background ==
Robert Vickers was recruited into the band in February 1982. Following short tours of Switzerland, Britain and Germany, they went to the studio between 4 and 7 May 1983 and recorded "Man O'Sand to Girl O'Sea" and "Newton Told Me" with John Brand producing. The Go-Betweens then returned to Australia to promote Before Hollywood and "Cattle and Cane". Upon returning to England in August 1983 the band went back into the studio with John Brand and re-recorded "Man O'Sand to Girl O'Sea", together with "This Girl, Black Girl". The details are not clear as to why the recording was redone but it may have been related to ongoing difficulties with their label, Rough Trade.

McLennan said of the song, "If you think about it it's quite simple.'O' is an abbreviation for of...if you think of the metaphor of how the sea erodes the rock to make sand. I don't mean to be condescending, but I think it's quite beautiful."

== Critical reception ==
In a review in The Age newspaper, Chris Johnston said ""Man O'Sand" is typically (Grant) McLennan and (Robert) Forster in that it wraps up a simple sentiment in obtuse poetic constructs. It's a break-up song. Forster wrote the lyrics: I want you back, I want you back, I want you back, because I feel no better, feel no better, feel no better. Perhaps she was someone he went swimming with and perhaps he refused to swim. Perhaps she was mysterious like the depths of the ocean and he was certain and grounded."

Steve Bell of TheMusic.com.au states "While musically the song is all terse and fiery post-punk and features excellent percussion from Morrison to offset Forster’s deft guitar lines, the lyrics are desperate and pleading but couched in vaguely highbrow imagery – hyper-literacy was always one of the band’s strengths, yet seemed easily confused with pretence by the more casual listener. It’s a great song but it seems slightly incongruous now that it was chosen as a viable radio single given what was airing at the time (although the single version was a slightly more urgent alternate take and slightly abridged compared to the album version)."

In a review of Spring Hill Fair, Allmusic's Ned Raggett describes the song's "pounding chorus one of the band's best captured moments of desperation." He goes on to state ""Man O'Sand to Girl O'Sea" was recorded in a mood of, as Robert Forster later described it, "let's burn this land." And burn the band did, in its own soaring, strong way, Forster's guitar reaching a prime post-punk fire and kick, clear, ringing, wiry, but not trying to imitate the Edge." and "The Robert Vickers/Lindy Morrison combination gets as speedy and blunt as it ever did on the chorus, Forster almost spitting out the syllables of the title with desperation."

NME was less complimentary at the time of release, saying the band, "seem reluctant to colour their jagged guitar soundscape with commercial poptones. They have a detachment from that strand of their sound that borders on sarcasm and it prevents their music attaining a fulsome, rounded finish."

== Track listing ==
=== Original 7" Vinyl release ===
All tracks are written by G. McLennan, R. Forster

No.	Title	Length
1.	"Man O'Sand to Girl O'Sea"	3:25
2.	"This Girl, Black Girl"	2:31

== Release history ==
Region	Date	Label	Format	Catalogue
United Kingdom	October 1983	Rough Trade	7" vinyl	BEG 159

== Credits ==
The Go-Betweens

- Grant McLennan — vocals, lead guitar, loops, treatments
- Lindy Morrison — drums
- Robert Forster — vocals, rhythm guitar
- Robert Vickers — bass

Production

- Producer — John Brand
- Photography — Bleddyn Butcher (cover photo)
