= Oceans Apart =

Studio album by the Go-Betweens
- Released: 3 May 2005
- Recorded: November 2004 – January 2005
- Genre: Rock
- Length: 65:04
- Label: LO-MAX, EMI
- Producer: Mark Wallis, Dave Ruffy

The Go-Betweens chronology
Bright Yellow Bright Orange (2003)	Oceans Apart (2005)	Quiet Heart (2012)

Singles from Oceans Apart
- 1. "Here Comes a City" Released: 23 May 2005; 2. "Finding You" Released: 25 July 2005

Oceans Apart is the ninth and final studio album by the Go-Betweens, released in 2005. All the songs were written by Grant McLennan and Robert Forster. The album was recorded at the Good Luck Studios in London between November 2004 through to January 2005—except for "Boundary Rider", which was recorded at The White Room Recording Studio in Brisbane.

== Details ==
The live recordings on the bonus disc were recorded at The Barbican Concert Hall, London, on 27 June 2004.

The album won the 2005 "Adult Contemporary Album" award at the 2005 ARIA music awards.

Many reviews and fans complained of the aggressively loud and distorted mastering of the initial release by Jon Astley to the extent that Lo-Max offered to exchange the original pressing for a newer release where the problem is less evident.

Forster later claimed "Darlinghurst Nights" was the song he was most pleased with writing throughout his career. He said, "I loved writing the lyric, and I could just get all these people in - Frank Brunetti, who used to be in Died Pretty and was a music journalist on RAM; Clinton Walker is in it. It's a song that no-one else could have written but me - for better or worse."

McLennan said, "We didn't want to be on the outer ripples of the pond anymore. We wanted to jump back into the maelstrom – London, just the energy, the competition of the place. We've made enough records and have listened to enough records by other people that we know this is a fucking good one."

== Reception ==
Professional ratings
Aggregate scores
Source	Rating
Metacritic	85/100
Review scores
Source	Rating
AllMusic	4/5 stars
Blender	4/5 stars
Entertainment Weekly	A−
The Guardian	5/5 stars
Mojo	5/5 stars
Pitchfork	7.0/10
Rolling Stone	3.5/5 stars
Spin	B+
Uncut	4/5 stars
The Village Voice	A

According to the review aggregator Metacritic, Oceans Apart received "universal acclaim" based on a weighted average score of 85 out of 100 from 23 critic scores. The site named it the 22nd-best-reviewed album of 2005.

== Track listing ==
1. "Here Comes a City" – 3:25
2. "Finding You" – 4:02
3. "Born to a Family" – 3:08
4. "No Reason to Cry" – 3:53
5. "Boundary Rider" – 2:45
6. "Darlinghurst Nights" – 6:18
7. "Lavender" – 3:09
8. "The Statue" – 4:25
9. "This Night's for You" – 4:25
10. "The Mountains Near Dellray" – 3:28

=== Bonus disc ===
1. "People Say" (Live) – 3:31
2. "He Lives My Life" (Live) – 4:03
3. "The Wrong Road" (Live) – 5:17
4. "Bye Bye Pride" (Live) – 4:54
5. "When People Are Dead" (Live) – 4:45
6. "Streets of Your Town" (Live) – 3:36

== Personnel ==
=== Go-Betweens ===
- Robert Forster – vocals, guitars, piano, organ
- Grant McLennan – vocals, guitars
- Adele Pickvance – bass, keyboards, backing vocals
- Glenn Thompson – drums, keyboards, guitar, backing vocals

=== Additional musicians ===
- Tom Rees-Roberts – flugelhorn
- Trevor Miles – trombone
- David Powell – tuba
- Duncan Lamont – clarinet
- Dave Ruffy – keyboards, percussion
