= Finding You (The Go-Betweens song) =

Single by The Go-Betweens

from the album Oceans Apart
- A-side: "Finding You"
- B-side: "Born to a Family"
- Released: July 2005
- Recorded: November 2004 – January 2005; Good Luck Studios, London
- Genre: Pop rock; Indie rock
- Length: 4:02
- Label: LO-MAX
- Songwriters: Robert Forster, Grant McLennan
- Producer: Mark Wallis

The Go-Betweens singles chronology
"Here Comes a City" (2005)	"Finding You" (2005)

"Finding You" is a song by Australian indie group The Go-Betweens that was released as the second single from their ninth studio album Oceans Apart. It was released as a promotional CD single on the LO-MAX Records label in the United Kingdom in July 2005 and by Tuition Records in Germany on 25 July 2005.

The song peaked at No. 17 on the Austrian Singles chart in December 2005. "Finding You" was the last single released by the Go-Betweens, as the group disbanded following the death of co-bandleader Grant McLennan in 2006.

== Composition ==
Robert Forster in a later interview described as a song he loved, "I really like the powerful build-up, it hits the line about lightning and then it’s like a crescendo. It’s written by Grant and he wrote it probably two years or something before he died, and I think it’s one of the best five to 10 songs he ever did. Magnificent song. I wrote most of the lyric. He wrote the chorus thing and I asked if I could write the verse lyric. It was so fresh; he played it to me and he’d only written it a week or two ago. He’d written the chorus and he was just making stuff up in the verses. I asked him – it just hit me so hard, I could hear it and I drove away from that session and I had that song in my head. I got home and I just wrote the lyric. Phoned him up and said, “I’m sorry but I just jumped in on this.” He said, “Great, bring it over to me.” A couple of days later I had it all on a sheet and he put the sheet beside his guitar, sang it first time through, put in his chorus – all that lightning stuff is his as well, that middle eight is all him as well. He just put his chorus and middle eight to my three verses and bang, you know? It’s a real collaborative piece of songwriting."

== Ed Kuepper cover ==
Kuepper was asked to provide a song to Love Goes On: A Tribute To Grant McLennan and then also included the song on his album Jean Lee and the Yellow Dog. Kuepper said, "It was important to me to do something relatively recent of his. But it also reminded me that back in the early 80's when the Gobs first moved to Sydney, Grant crashed at my house for a while. We had a bit of a chat about music and Grant [told] me quite earnestly 'Ed, you'll never have a hit record if you keep writing songs in minor keys'. I laughed and let it pass because he was a young country boy in the big smoke for the first time and I could vaguely remember what that was like. I mention this because even though I like the lyric the main thing that attracted me to "Finding You" was the fact it had been written in A minor."

== Reception ==
AllMusic's Thom Jurek, in his review of Oceans Apart, describes the song as being "beautiful" "with its lilting guitars, spare, clean lines, and poetic, emotional lyrics that can open veins with the fine slash of their honesty."

Adam Moerder in Pitchfork states that "Finding You" benefits the most out of all the songs on the album "from Wallis's tinkering: Instead of the Sydney Symphony Orchestra, Forster's stark electric lead and McLennan's delicate "ah's" comprise the song's climactic bridge."

Grant McLennan in an April 2005 interview commented that "'Finding You' has got a touch of, you know, [a] party upstairs at the Dome in the mid-60s of the Warhol scene." and that the b-side, "Born to a Family" was a "sort of knees-up, 2/4 kind of jump song."

In musicOMH, Tony Heywood, states "the song begins with a crystalline melody, shimmering off the strings of McLennan’s acoustic guitar. His voice rich and tender, an aching cello adds a bittersweet undertow and a biting distorted guitar swoops in. It builds, gently unwinds, builds again and then evaporates into a blissful double tracked vocal. When McLennan sings “and then the lighting [sic] finds us” the hairs on the back of my neck prickle and my heart swoons." The Sydney Morning Herald simply calls "Finding You" an "upbeat love song."

Tom Zimpleman in Dusted magazine considers that "'Finding You' is probably too sentimental for most people’s taste, as he’s literally talking about the song, qua representation of its author, finding a lost loved one."

== Track listing ==
All tracks are written by R. Forster, G. McLennan

No.	Title	Length
1.	"Finding You"	3:59
2.	"Born to a Family"	3:08
3.	"Streets of Your Town" (live at the Barbican, London, 27 June 2004)	3:35

== Release history ==
Date	Region	Label	Format	Catalogue
July 2005	United Kingdom	LO-MAX	CD single	LO-MAX CD022P
25 July 2005	Germany	Tuition	CD single	TIN 0002 2

== Personnel ==
=== Go-Betweens ===
- Robert Forster – vocals, guitars, piano, organ
- Grant McLennan – vocals, guitars
- Adele Pickvance – bass, keyboards, backing vocals
- Glenn Thompson – drums, keyboards, guitar, backing vocals

=== Additional musicians ===
- Dave Ruffy – keyboards, percussion ("Finding You", "Born to a Family")

Production

- Engineer — Dave Ruffy
- Producer — Mark Wallis
