= Before Hollywood =

Studio album by the Go-Betweens
- Released: May 1983
- Recorded: October 1982
- Studio: ICC (Eastbourne, England)
- Genre: Rock, alternative rock, indie rock
- Length: 39:00
- Label: Rough Trade
- Producer: John Brand

The Go-Betweens chronology
Send Me a Lullaby (1982)	Before Hollywood (1983)	Spring Hill Fair (1984)

Singles from Before Hollywood
- 1. "Cattle and Cane" Released: February 1983

Before Hollywood is the second album by Australian rock band the Go-Betweens, released in May 1983. The album reached No. 2 on the UK Independent Charts and a single, "Cattle and Cane", reached No. 4. In 2001 "Cattle and Cane" was voted as one of the 30 all-time best Australian songs in an Australasian Performing Right Association poll of 100 music industry personalities.

The album, recorded in the UK, was the first to have a 50-50 split of songs written by Robert Forster and Grant McLennan. In a 1996 radio interview McLennan nominated Before Hollywood as one of his two definitive Go-Betweens albums, describing it as a "nice combination of our skewered and classic songwriting, but with a heavy underground feeling".

An expanded version was released in 2002 featuring a second disc of eight bonus tracks and a music video for "Cattle and Cane".

== Recording ==
Songwriting for the album began with Robert Forster's "By Chance", which was written in Melbourne in December 1981, a month after the Australian release of the band's debut album, Send Me a Lullaby. Forster admitted he had disliked much of what he had written in 1980 and 1981 and had been in "a hole". But "By Chance" marked the turnaround. "I was away again, my songwriting driven by the simple logic that if I could write one strong song, I could write another." The song was used as the B-side to the Grant McLennan composition "Hammer the Hammer", which was released as a single in March 1982. Missing Link label boss Keith Glass, who had funded the recording and distribution of Send Me a Lullaby, told the band he could not finance a second LP, but began shopping the debut album overseas. Geoff Travis, owner of Rough Trade Records in London, agreed to license both the album and the new single for UK release, then also invited the Go-Betweens to London to record a follow-up album.

By the time the band arrived in London in May 1982, they had a new song, McLennan's "A Bad Debt Follows You", which was followed soon after by Forster's "On My Block". In letters back to friends in Brisbane, Forster wrote that they had "a wealth of songs" for the as-yet unnamed album. Apparently fascinated by a recently aired documentary TV series on the history of Hollywood, he wrote of his sadness over the death of actor Grace Kelly and his concern that "so much of Hollywood is dying".

As they rehearsed for the upcoming album, the band discussed with Travis possible options for its recording: the band was unenthusiastic about Travis's proposal that they work in New York with Chris Stamey of power pop outfit the dB's, instead suggesting they book a studio in Tennessee with Jim Dickinson, who had earlier worked with the Byrds and played keyboards with Ry Cooder. Robbie Robertson from the Band and Lindsey Buckingham from Fleetwood Mac were also suggested as possible producers. The decision in the end was to go with John Brand, an engineer who had worked with XTC and Magazine and was making the transition from engineer to record producer. Brand had just completed High Land, Hard Rain, the debut album by Aztec Camera, for Rough Trade at International Christian Communications (ICC) Studios in the seaside town of Eastbourne, and its two singles featured catchy, singalong choruses that were directly aimed at the charts. Author David Nichols has speculated that McLennan particularly was keen for Brand to lead the Go-Betweens in a more commercial direction with simpler songs and less complex drumming. In a 1983 radio interview, McLennan said Brand had been strict about keeping the drums to a steady rhythm and the singing in tune—"because Robert and I have a propensity to wander off in directions of sheer anarchic brilliance. And he said, 'No anarchic brilliance on this record, just straight melody and in tune.'"

Brand brought in an Australian keyboardist, Bernie Clarke, who had shared production duties on High Land, Hard Rain and formulated a sound that Forster later said was "not fashionable at the time: live drums, electric and acoustic guitar, Hammond organ and piano". Forster also praised Brand's skill at breaking down song structures and instrumentation, to tighten and enhance them when reassembling. He noted:

He favoured a careful layering of instrumentation. It's a method that can lead to sterility of sound, but John got the balance between live recording and a coating of overdubs just right. In the process he did a wonderful thing to our music—he rained colour through it. Where Send Me a Lullaby was like a great recording of us in the practice room, Before Hollywood was a production—the band brightened, the tunefulness brought forward, the quirky riffs and time signatures kept—yet, through John's engineering skills, clear and punchy.

The setting for the recording added a further dimension to the album's tone. Though most of the album had been written through summer, Eastbourne in autumn presented a dark and moody contrast. The band often walked along the town's 19th century seafront and surveyed its decaying present with its nostalgia for a romantic past.

== Songwriting ==
Before Hollywood was the first Go-Betweens album to list all songwriter credits as "Forster/McLennan" and marked the point when both writers made a verbal agreement that each would have an equal number of songs on every album.

Forster rated the songs on the album as the best set he and McLennan had ever written, most flowing "in a gold rush over a warm English summer". He said his songs were mostly built out of "By Chance" (which Brand re-recorded for the album) and that his improved guitar riffs were the foundations for "Before Hollywood" and "On My Block." He said "As Long As That" was written as an ode to his then partner, drummer Lindy Morrison.

Forster described McLennan's five songs as "enormous ... an exciting set of pop songs built on his greatest strength—melody, which he could spin by the yard". Among McLennan's contributions were "Dusty In Here," directed to the ghost of his father, a doctor, who had died when McLennan was aged six, and "Cattle and Cane", a part-autobiographical song inspired by his childhood in far north Queensland. Forster wrote of "Cattle and Cane": "It proved difficult to put chords to, so I doubled his part; then Lindy arrived with her drumsticks and announced that the song was in some incredible time count ... 13/8 or something, which theoretically only Charlie Parker could play, and to her credit she didn't try to straighten it, only preserved its oddness, in turn making one of the most distinctive beats in rock." Another McLennan composition, "That Way," was written about his musician friend Peter Walsh, a former member of The Apartments, who had left Brisbane to move to New York.

== Critical reception ==
Professional ratings
Review scores
Source	Rating
AllMusic	4.5/5 stars
Entertainment Weekly	A−
NME	8/10
Now	4/5
Q	4/5 stars
The Rolling Stone Album Guide	3/5 stars
Select	3/5
Spin Alternative Record Guide	8/10
Uncut	4.5/5 stars
The Village Voice	B+

Reviewing in NME at the time of release, Mat Snow said "Lindy Morrison's drumming is crisp, subtle and dynamic, Grant's bass is a model of telling economy and Robert plays a song-writer's guitar – soaring and lyrical but always to the point." The influence of Bob Dylan, Tom Verlaine, and David Byrne is noted. The review concludes by describing the album as "a rare masterpiece."

Ned Raggett states in AllMusic that "The Go-Betweens were already a good band well before they made Before Hollywood, but this second album is what proved for many listeners that they were great. For good reason – both Robert Forster's and Grant McLennan's singing sounds much more honestly theirs, finding their own voices, while collectively the trio create a series of intricate, surprising melodies and songs which balance past and present beautifully."

Andrew Stafford, in his book Pig City: From the Saints to Savage Garden, states "Before Hollywood' s impressionistic lyrics and sparkling blend of acoustic and electric textures recalled earlier folk influences – Simon & Garfunkel, the Byrds, and, especially Bob Dylan's Bringing It All Back Home. Even Before Hollywood's sleeve design nods towards the Dylan album, with the Go-Betweens framed by a collection of antiques."

In October 2010 Before Hollywood was listed in the book 100 Best Australian Albums at No. 87, with their 1988 album 16 Lovers Lane at No. 12. The authors writing that "On Before Hollywood, The Go-Betweens offer up an elusive, lo-fi take on classic mid '60s Bob Dylan and the New York downtown sound a decade later."

== Track listing ==
(All tracks written by Grant McLennan and Robert Forster)

No.	Title	Lyrics	Length
1.	"A Bad Debt Follows You"	McLennan	2:24
2.	"Two Steps Step Out"	McLennan	3:28
3.	"Before Hollywood"	Forster	3:44
4.	"Dusty in Here"	McLennan	4:09
5.	"Ask"	Forster	5:14
6.	"Cattle and Cane"	McLennan	4:20
7.	"By Chance"	Forster	2:20
8.	"As Long As That"	McLennan, Forster	5:25
9.	"On My Block"	Forster	3:49
10.	"That Way"	McLennan	4:07
Total length:			39:00

2002 bonus disc
No.	Title	Writer(s)	Length
1.	"Hammer the Hammer"	McLennan	2:49
2.	"Heaven Says"		4:06
3.	"Just a King in Mirrors"		2:57
4.	"A Peaceful Wreck"		2:31
5.	"Man O'Sand to Girl O'Sea"	Forster	3:24
6.	"Near the Chimney"		3:39
7.	"This Girl, Black Girl"		3:32
8.	"The Exception of Deception"		1:49
9.	"Cattle and Cane" (video)
Total length:			24:47

== Release history ==
Date	Region	Label	Format	Catalogue
May 1983	UK	Rough Trade	LP	ROUGH 54
May 1983	AUS	Stunn	LP	STUN 508
1984	AUS	Rough Trade	LP	RTRANZ 008
1990	UK	Rough Trade	CD	ROUGH LCD 54
1990	US	Rough Trade	CD	ROUGH US 91
1990	AUS	Red Eye	Cassette	RED MC 16
1990	AUS	Red Eye	LP	RED LP 16
March 1996	UK	Beggars Banquet	CD	BBL 2002 CD
March 1996	AUS	Silk Sheen	CD	SILK 003
March 1996	JP	Rough Trade	CD	TKCB-70897
2002	UK	Circus	CD	FYL010
2002	US	Jetset	CD	TWA47CD
2002	AUS	EMI Australia	CD	0946 3 69608 2 1

== Personnel ==
The Go-Betweens

- Robert Forster — vocals, guitar, rhythm guitar
- Grant McLennan — vocals, bass guitar, guitar
- Lindy Morrison — drums, backing vocals

Additional musicians

- Bernard Clarke — organ, piano
- Robert Vickers — bass guitar on bonus tracks "The Man O'Sand to Girl O'Sea" and "This Girl, Black Girl"

=== Production ===
- Producer/Engineer — John Brand
- Photography — Tom Sheehan
- Layout — Martyn Lambert
