= Spring Rain (The Go-Betweens song) =

Single by the Go-Betweens

from the album Liberty Belle and the Black Diamond Express
- A-side: "Spring Rain"
- B-side: "The Life at Hand"
- Released: 1986
- Genre: Rock, pop
- Length: 3:05
- Label: Beggars Banquet, True Tone
- Songwriter(s): Grant McLennan, Robert Forster
- Producer(s): Richard Preston, The Go-Betweens

The Go-Betweens singles chronology
"Bachelor Kisses" (1984)	"Spring Rain" (1986)	"Head Full of Steam" (1986)

"Spring Rain" is a song by the Australian alternative rock band the Go-Betweens that was released as the lead single from their fourth album Liberty Belle and the Black Diamond Express in 1986. The single was issued by Beggars Banquet in the UK and Truetone in Australia, failing to chart in the UK and reaching number 92 in Australia.

In the UK a 12-inch single was also released, with an extra b-side, "Little Joe".

== Details ==
Songwriter Robert Forster said the song was written when he was in London in his late twenties, looking back on a time when he was in his late teens and living in Brisbane suburbia. He said song reminded him of Creedence Clearwater Revival in, "just the music and the way that chorus is especially. And there's a simplicity to it; a beauty to it. It's one of those happy things where you really like something like a group and it might take you years and years and years till you write something in that vein and suddenly you see it."

In 2016, Forster wrote, "Instead of labouring over lyrics, as had been my way, I wrote quickly, first thought best thought, taking Grant's example of delving into the past, to stop at eighteen.

The song featured in the movies Something Wild (1986) and Kingpin (1996) but appeared on neither soundtrack CD.

== Reception ==
Describing the song in AllMusic, it was said, "There's a gentle lope and swing as much breezy '60s pop as there is roots revival intensity". While the reviewer noted the oddly hollow drum sound, they concluded, "Forster's ear for a lyrical image (check the part talking about hanging one's elbow out of the window of a car) and the soaring chorus make this number a winner in the end."

PopMatters described the song as, "a mid-tempo countrified tune featuring the strong give and take chorus from vocalists Robert Forster and Grant McLennan. Reeking of all the melody and infectious Brit, er, Aussie pop it's capable of, it glides along without any need for tweaking." Nick Reynolds from the BBC said, "the optimistic shuffle of 'Spring Rain' [is] one of their finest moments." Rock Australia Magazine noted Forster's "fractured vocals lending an air of casualness to the jaunty rhythm and straight verse line".

== Track listing ==
All tracks are written by G. McLennan and R. Forster.

7-inch vinyl version
No.	Title	Length
1.	"Spring Rain"	3:05
2.	"The Life at Hand"	2:53
Total length:		5:58

All tracks are written by G. McLennan and R. Forster.

12-inch vinyl version
No.	Title	Length
1.	"Spring Rain"	3:05
2.	"The Life at Hand"	2:53
3.	"Little Joe"	3:24
Total length:		9:22

== Release history ==
Year	Country	Label	Format	Catalogue No.
1986	UK	Beggars Banquet	7" single	BEG 155
1986	UK	Beggars Banquet	12" single	BEG 155T
1986	AUS	True Tone	7" single	884 473-7

== Personnel ==
=== Go-Betweens ===
- Robert Forster — vocals, guitar
- Grant McLennan — vocals, guitar
- Lindy Morrison — drums
- Robert Vickers — bass
