= Danger in the Past =

Studio album by Robert Forster
- Released: 1990
- Recorded: 20 June – 4 July 1990
- Studios: Hansa and Preussen Ton, Berlin
- Genre: Rock
- Length: 38:22
- Label: Beggars Banquet
- Producer: Mick Harvey

Robert Forster chronology
| Danger in the Past (1990) | Calling from a Country Phone (1993) |

Professional ratings
Review scores
| Source | Rating |
|---|---|
| AllMusic | 3/5 stars |
| The Rolling Stone Album Guide | 4/5 stars |
| Select | 4/5 medals |

Danger in the Past is the debut solo album by Robert Forster, formerly of the Go-Betweens. It was recorded in Germany, where Forster was living.

== Details ==
Forster had recently moved to Bavaria to be with his future wife, Karin Bäumler, who appeared on the album. He said, "I phoned Mick Harvey, who was up in Berlin, and asked him if he wanted to produce it, and he was very enthusiastic." Forster explained, "When Nick Cave & the Bad Seeds did Your Funeral, My Trial, I absolutely loved that record. I knew that the person largely responsible for that sound was Mick. Very natural, very real, but also sounded big, and I love that."

The album was recorded over 12 days. Musicians on the album included Bad Seeds Hugo Race and Thomas Wydler. Forster said, "It was a stressful time for Mick. He was - I'd call it co-managing The Seeds. But it was a beautiful atmosphere, it was going back to playing living, breathing music. It was the record I'd always dreamed of making."

Forster later said, "Our work method was simple. Thomas would listen to a demo; Mick, on bass, would talk him through the arrangement; we'd go into the recording room, play the song no more than four times, do a take, and then go on to the next number. In this manner we were doing three of four songs a day. I was skipping between the recording and control rooms exalted.

For the cover of the album, Forster was photographed in a similar to pose to a picture of James Joyce he'd found in a library in Ravensburg University, where Bäumler was studying, after he noted the resemblance to his grandfather. "I decided to replicate the photo for the cover and make no mention of it; just send it out in the world and see what people made of it."

== Track listing ==
All songs written by Robert Forster.

Side one

1. "Baby Stones" – 4:07
2. "The River People" – 3:25
3. "Leave Here Satisfied" – 4:59
4. "Heart Out to Tender" – 4:14
5. "Is This What You Call Change" – 2:38

Side two

1. "Dear Black Dream" – 6:04
2. "Danger in the Past" – 4:50
3. "I've Been Looking for Somebody" – 4:20
4. "Justice" – 3:45

== Personnel ==
- Robert Forster – guitar, vocals
- Mick Harvey – organ, bass, guitar, percussion, piano, vocals
- Hugo Race – guitar
- Thomas Wydler – drums
- Karin Bäumler – vocals
