= Liberty Belle and the Black Diamond Express =

Studio album by the Go-Betweens
- Released: March 1986
- Studio: Berry Street, London, England
- Genre: Rock, alternative rock, indie rock
- Length: 36:53
- Label: Beggars Banquet
- Producer: Richard Preston, The Go-Betweens

The Go-Betweens chronology
Spring Hill Fair (1984)	Liberty Belle and the Black Diamond Express (1986)	Tallulah (1987)

Singles from Liberty Belle and the Black Diamond Express
- 1. "Spring Rain" Released: February 1986; 2. "Head Full of Steam" Released: May 1986

Liberty Belle and the Black Diamond Express, the fourth album by the Go-Betweens, was released in March 1986 in the UK on Beggars Banquet Records, the record label that would release the remainder of the original group's LPs through their break-up in 1989. The album was recorded at Berry Street Studios in London, England. The original release consisted of ten songs. The UK CD release in 1986 (BEGA 72) had the original ten tracks, plus two bonus tracks: "The Life At Hand" and "Little Joe". In 2004, LO-MAX Records released an expanded CD which included a second disc of eleven bonus tracks and music videos for the songs "Spring Rain" and "Head Full of Steam" (Single Version).

== Details ==
The band had signed a deal with an English branch of the label Elektra, which closed two weeks into the album's recording. The Go-Betweens' co-founder Robert Forster said, "Elektra pays for the record and doesn't even know it. We've got an album that's ours, we can sell it to anyone. Free album." Soon after, they signed with Beggars Banquet.

Drummer Lindy Morrison later said, "This is my favourite album. This is a really, really fabulous album. We produced this ourselves and it's got the best songs, and I think every single song is a classic. And if we had produced those songs the way radio demands – like, if we'd used drum machines and just had synthesisers do most of the stuff – I think we could have got a hit."

The band entered the studio determined to create the album they envisioned. Forster later wrote, "If this was to be our last shot, it had to be on our terms. There'd be no drum machines, no piecemeal recording, no acquiescence to higher authority. Our intention was to expand on the crisp, woody sound of Before Hollywood, to include a grander, more exotic range of instrumentation."

Both Grant McLennan and Forster praised the contributions of Dean B. Speedwell. McLennan said, "We used another person on that record, like we had on Before Hollywood, a kind of keyboard-y dude called Dean B. Speedwell, and he was such a musician that we could say 'Well, we want vibes like Lionel Hampton' and he could do it, or we wanted a bassoon part and he could play it."

Later McLennan said, "There was quite a fundamental musical change in the band towards simplification. Something we've been accused of in the past, of being almost a pop band, almost an art band, you know, now we're simplifying. Thinking more of 4/4." Similarly. Forster claimed to have had a revelation in the wake of Spring Hill Fair. He said, "I'm writing a lot less complicated music, and it's giving me space to put myself in it."

== Reception ==
Professional ratings
Review scores
Source	Rating
AllMusic	4.5/5 stars
Blender	4/5 stars
Mojo	4/5 stars
NME	10/10
PopMatters	8/10
The Rolling Stone Album Guide	3/5 stars
Select	5/5
Spin Alternative Record Guide	8/10
Uncut	5/5 stars
The Village Voice	A−

In his review for The Village Voice, Robert Christgau wrote that "there are no popsters writing stronger personal love songs. I doubt there are any page poets envisioning more plangently, either." BBC Music said, "If you like lyrics, and rambling imagery, you'll love these songs. There are ten of them in thirty six minutes. Only the flat production lets them down; something they often had trouble with. But alongside Spring Hill Fair this is their best album."

AllMusic noted, "Robert Forster's endearingly fey persona, equal parts Bryan Ferry and gangly bookstore clerk, reaches full flower on the Go-Betweens' fourth album, which tempers the angularity and occasional claustrophobia of the band's previous work with a new airiness and nervous romanticism. The lighter sound can be partly attributed to the growing influence of co-leader Grant McLennan." Mojo said the album was "organic, homespun, with echoes of Australian country in its classicist rock novellas".

== Track listing ==
All tracks are written by G. McLennan, R. Forster.

No.	Title	Length
1.	"Spring Rain"	3:10
2.	"The Ghost and the Black Hat"	2:36
3.	"The Wrong Road"	4:57
4.	"To Reach Me"	3:37
5.	"Twin Layers of Lightning"	4:25
6.	"In the Core of a Flame"	2:57
7.	"Head Full of Steam"	3:36
8.	"Bow Down"	3:47
9.	"Palm Sunday (On Board the SS Within)"	3:19
10.	"Apology Accepted"	4:25
11.	"Spring Rain" (video on 2004 expanded CD)
12.	"Head Full of Steam" (single version - video on 2004 expanded CD)
Total length:		36:53

All tracks are written by G. McLennan, R. Forster, except where noted.

2004 bonus disc
No.	Title	Length
1.	"Life at Hand"	3:34
2.	"Don't Let Him Come Back" (new version)	2:39
3.	"Apology Accepted" (radio session)	3:48
4.	"I Work in a Health Spa"	3:42
5.	"Bow Down" (early version)	4:09
6.	"Casanova's Last Words"	2:39
7.	"Head Full of Steam" (single version)	3:38
8.	"Little Joe"	3:28
9.	"Wrong Road" (early version)	3:18
10.	"Reunion Dinner"	4:49
11.	"I'm Gonna Knock on Your Door" (Aaron Schroeder and Sid Wayne)	1:53
Total length:		37:37

== Release history ==
Year	Country	Label	Format	Catalogue No.
1986	UK	Beggars Banquet	LP	BEGA 72
1986	UK	Beggars Banquet	Cassette	BEGC 72
1986	UK	Beggars Banquet	CD	BEGA 72 CD
1986	AUS	True Tone	LP	826 714-1
1986	AUS	True Tone	Cassette	826 714-4
1986	US	Big Time	LP	10030-1
1986	GER	Rebel Rec.	LP	RE 0024
1986	CA	Vertigo	LP	VOG-1-3369
1986	JP	Japan	LP	25JAL-3059
1988	UK	Beggars Banquet	LP	BBL 72
1996	UK	Beggars Banquet	CD	BBL 2004 CD
1996	AUS	Silk Sheen	CD	SILK 005
2004	UK	LO-MAX	CD	LO-MAX CD002
2004	AUS	EMI Australia	CD	3696022
2004	US	Jetset	CD	TWA70CD

== Personnel ==
The Go-Betweens

- Robert Forster — vocals, rhythm guitar
- Grant McLennan — vocals, lead guitar, loops, treatments
- Lindy Morrison — drums
- Robert Vickers — bass guitar

Additional musicians

- Dean B. Speedwell — organ, piano, accordion, vibes, bassoon
- Audrey Riley — cello, string arrangements
- Chris Tomlin — 1st violin
- Sally Herbert — 2nd violin
- Sue Dench — viola
- Tracey Thorn — backing vocals on "Head Full of Steam" and "Apology Accepted"
- Richard Preston — loops, treatments on "Reunion Dinner"
