= 16 Lovers Lane =

Studio album by the Go-Betweens
- Released: August 19, 1988
- Recorded: April–May 1988
- Studio: Studios 301 (Sydney)
- Genres: Rock; alternative rock; indie rock
- Length: 37:04
- Labels: Mushroom (AUS); Beggars Banquet (UK)
- Producer: Mark Wallis

The Go-Betweens chronology
Tallulah (1987)	16 Lovers Lane (1988)	The Friends of Rachel Worth (2000)

Singles from 16 Lovers Lane
- 1. "Streets of Your Town" Released: July 1988; 2. "Was There Anything I Could Do?" Released: October 1988; 3. "Love Goes On" Released: 1989

16 Lovers Lane is the sixth studio album by Australian indie rock group the Go-Betweens, released in 1988 by Beggars Banquet Records. Prior to the recording of the album, longtime bassist Robert Vickers left the band when the other group members decided to return to Australia after having spent several years in London, England; he was replaced by John Willsteed. The album was recorded at Studios 301 in Sydney, between Christmas 1987 and Autumn 1988.

16 Lovers Lane was the final release from the original version of the band. The Go-Betweens broke up in 1989 and would produce no other material until Grant McLennan and Robert Forster reformed the band, with a new line-up, in 2000.

== Details ==
In late 1987, the band relocated from the UK to Sydney. The relationship between guitarist Robert Forster and drummer Lindy Morrison had ended, whilst singer Grant McLennan and violinist Amanda Brown became more involved. Upon their return to Australia, the band added John Willsteed on bass and began preparing their sixth album.

The recording process for 16 Lovers Lane was different to previous releases. Between December 1987 and January 1988, McLennan and Forster began an intense songwriting process. They demoed all the songs in advance and then presented them to the producer and their bandmates, leaving less room for improvisation. McLennan stated: "We really sat down for the first time in years and wrote together in the sense that anything new we'd come up with the night before we'd go through and rearrange and discard or put it into something else. Our normal method was to write separately and the spend two weeks together, familiarising ourselves with each others songs and suggesting things. So this way was a completely different process and it was due to trying to get back to what started the band – closeness."

McLennan said the band was also affected by moving back to Australia. "We'd spent five years in London—blackness, darkness, greyness and poverty—and suddenly for some reason we seemed to have more money in Sydney, and we all had places to live and being in a city where after five years we can go to the beach in ten minutes." Forster agreed saying it brought on "a burst of energy, a burst of songs".

McLennan said, "I had a vision for this record. It was, in some way, just sitting down with acoustic guitars in sunlight, writing songs, and then making a record. It was as simple as that. And I get that vibe from the record, a summer feeling". Forster described the album as, "the perfect combination between London melancholy and Sydney sunshine".

The songwriting duo demoed sixteen tunes acoustically and sent them to English producer Mark Wallis prior to his arrival in Australia. The book 100 Best Australian Albums states that Wallis' production maintained the acoustic feel, embellishing them sparingly and "affording them a sparkle and crispness that suggested the summer that was their inspiration". Morrison was said to have "hated" Wallis, which may be a reflection of the fact that Wallis replaced Morrison with a drum machine on five of the songs on the album. Both Morrison and Brown were unhappy with the pre-production process, which limited their contribution, but Forster defended it, saying: "The pre-production to every album can't always been the same. You can't keep doing the same things over and over". Still, in the documentary Great Australian Albums (2008) episode one, on the album, Wallis says that the drumming on all of the tracks are a mix of programmed and real drums, and Morrison – not available all the time for family reasons – says that you can tell that the machine beats are still hers from the fact that "everything is so simple".

"Unbelievably brilliant, I think the whole album was incredible. Normally if you have an album with two singers and two writers, there's always one that you like better. Not in the case of The Go-Betweens, two equally talented guys, just like Lennon and McCartney."

— −Steve Kilbey

Elsewhere, Forster blamed others for the synthetic nature of the recordings. He said: "I wanted to make the kind of record I ended up making on Danger in the Past. I just wanted the band to be playing live, get us into a really big studio. Instead, it was one person in the studio with the rest of them playing pool. Lindy would be talking about drum machines, and her and Amanda were talking about triggering the violin to make synthesizer keyboard sounds. The only two live tracks on that album are both my songs, and I insisted on those." In 2016, Forster wrote, "I had trouble with 16 Lovers Lane for a long time. It wasn't until the late nineties that I recognised it for what it was – a pop record".

The original release of the album contained ten songs. Most of McLennan's lyrics were written about Brown.

In 2004, LO-MAX Records issued a greatly expanded CD, which included a second disc of ten bonus tracks, and music videos for the songs "Streets of Your Town" (two versions) and "Was There Anything I Could Do?", which were filmed to promote 16 Lovers Lane at the time of its initial release.

== Reception ==
Professional ratings
Review scores
Source	Rating
AllMusic	5/5 stars
Blender	4/5 stars
The Buffalo News	3.5/4 stars
Mojo	5/5 stars
NME	6/10
Q	4/5 stars
Record Mirror	5/5
Rolling Stone	3/5 stars
Uncut	5/5 stars
The Village Voice	A−

In a contemporary review for The Village Voice, Robert Christgau described 16 Lovers Lane as the Go-Betweens' "straightest and catchiest bunch of love songs" and called the band "still the romantic poets good popsters ought to be." Record Mirror critic Johnny Dee lauded the album as "classic, tearful, moving." In Spin, Evelyn McDonnell wrote that the band reminded her of "whooping cranes: great gangling creatures capable of heights of gracefulness when in flight and passionate spasms when in heat. Similarly, the Go-Betweens infuse portentious poetry into giddy pop structures, then throw the uncertain songs in the air, whispering 'Fly or fuck.'" On the album's more ornate production, McDonnell felt that Wallis' "tendency to over-embellish" resulted in occasional "putrid moments", while Michael Azerrad of Rolling Stone observed "a strangely pleasant flirtation with banality in the album's honeyed melodies, soft strings and wistful, understated vocals", despite the songs conveying "a depth of emotion and a height of intellect rarely found in pop".

In 2010, 16 Lovers Lane was listed at No. 12 in the book 100 Best Australian Albums. The authors called the album "the band's high-water mark", commenting that "Forster and McLennan knew they'd nailed it" and that the songs were "their most direct, accessible and heartfelt ever", with "Forster, particularly, having learnt a new restraint. Gone was the bravado and archness that had informed much of his earlier work and in its place was an openness and honesty."

16 Lovers Lane was included in the book 1001 Albums You Must Hear Before You Die. In 2021, it was listed at No. 15 in Rolling Stone Australia's "200 Greatest Australian Albums of All Time" countdown.

== Track listing ==
All tracks are written by Grant McLennan and Robert Forster.

Original 1988 release
No.	Title	Length
1.	"Love Goes On"	3:19
2.	"Quiet Heart"	5:20
3.	"Love Is a Sign"	4:12
4.	"You Can't Say No Forever"	3:57
5.	"The Devil's Eye"	2:05
6.	"Streets of Your Town"	3:36
7.	"Clouds"	4:02
8.	"Was There Anything I Could Do?"	3:06
9.	"I'm All Right"	3:10
10.	"Dive for Your Memory"	4:17
11.	"Streets of Your Town" (Australian video on 2004 expanded CD)
12.	"Streets of Your Town" (US/UK video on 2004 expanded CD)
13.	"Was There Anything I Could Do?" (video on 2004 expanded CD)

2004 CD Cover of 16 Lovers Lane

All tracks are written by G. McLennan, R. Forster, except where noted.

2004 bonus disc
No.	Title	Length
1.	"Love Goes On" (single version – re-mixed by Tom Visconti at Good Earth Studios, London in May 1988)	3:18
2.	"Wait Until June" (recorded at Electric Avenue Studios Sydney in 1988)	3:03
3.	"Mexican Postcard" (recorded at Bloomsbury London in August 1988)	2:13
4.	"Rock and Roll Friend" (recorded at Bloomsbury London in August 1988)	3:34
5.	"Casanova's Last Words" (recorded at Electric Avenue Studios Sydney in 1988)	2:38
6.	"You Won't Find It Again" (recorded at Trackdown Studios, Sydney on 14 January 1988)	3:21
7.	"Running the Risk of Losing You" (live – recorded at Max's Petersham Inn, Sydney on 15 December 1989)	3:06
8.	"Apples in Bed" (recorded at Damian Gerrard Studios, Ultimo, Sydney, in April 1988)	2:37
9.	"Head Over Heels" (recorded at Damian Gerrard Studios, Ultimo in April 1988)	2:27
10.	"You're a Big Girl Now" (Bob Dylan – recorded at McCabe's Guitar Shop in Santa Monica, California, on 11 November 1988)	3:41

== Release history ==
Region	Date	Label	Format	Catalogue
Australia	August 1988	Mushroom	LP	L38950
Australia	August 1988	Mushroom	CD	D38950
United Kingdom	August 1988	Beggars Banquet	LP	BEGA 95
United Kingdom	August 1988	Beggars Banquet	Cassette	BEGC 95
United Kingdom	August 1988	Beggars Banquet	CD	BEGA 95CD
United States	1988	Capitol	CD	CDP 7 91230 2
Germany	1988	Rebel Rec.	CD	SPV 85-2875
United Kingdom	1996	Beggars Banquet	CD	BBL 2006 CD
Australia	1996	Silk Sheen	CD	SILK 007
Europe	1996	Labels	CD	724384173029
United Kingdom	2004	LO-MAX	CD	LO-MAX CD004
Australia	2004	EMI Australia	CD	0946 3 69600 2 9
United States	2004	Jetset	CD	TWA72CD

== Personnel ==
=== The Go-Betweens ===
- Grant McLennan – lead vocals and backing vocals, lead guitars
- Amanda Brown – violin, oboe, adittional rhythm guitar, lead vocals, backing vocals and tambourine (listed as Oliver Tambo on the sleevenotes, an in-joke of the band)
- Robert Forster – rhythm guitars, harmonica and backing vocals
- John Willsteed – bass, spanish guitar, Hammond organ and piano
- Lindy Morrison – drums and drum machine Roland TR - 707

=== Additional musicians ===
- Michael Armiger – bass on "Running the Risk of Losing You"
