= The Friends of Rachel Worth =

Studio album by the Go-Betweens
- Released: 16 September 2000
- Recorded: February 2000
- Studio: Jackpot! Recording, Portland, Oregon
- Genre: Indie rock
- Length: 39:49
- Label: W. Minc (Australia); Circus (UK); Clearspot (Germany); Jetset (US)
- Producer: The Go-Betweens

The Go-Betweens chronology
16 Lovers Lane (1988)	The Friends of Rachel Worth (2000)	Bright Yellow Bright Orange (2003)

Singles from The Friends of Rachel Worth
- 1. "Going Blind" Released: January 2001; 2. "Surfing Magazines" Released: 25 July 2005

The Friends of Rachel Worth is the seventh studio album by Brisbane indie band the Go-Betweens, released in 2000, 12 years after their sixth, 16 Lovers Lane. For this album, Robert Forster and Grant McLennan were joined by all members of American indie rock bands Sleater-Kinney and Quasi as well as new bassist Adele Pickvance. The album was recorded in Portland, Oregon, at Jackpot! Recording Studio by Larry Crane.

McLennan said, "Rachel felt really natural – it wasn't like Robert and I had separate managers or any of that industry bullshit. We'd always wanted to record in America, too, so that was a real dream. I think it has a really mysterious, otherworldly, 'lost' feel to it."

== Reception ==
Professional ratings
Aggregate scores
Source	Rating
Metacritic	77/100
Review scores
Source	Rating
AllMusic	3.5/5 stars
Consumer Guide	A
Entertainment Weekly	B+
The Guardian	4/5 stars
Melody Maker	4/5 stars
NME	8/10
Pitchfork	6.5/10
Rolling Stone	3.5/5 stars
Spin	8/10
Uncut	4.5/5 stars

The Friends of Rachel Worth received generally positive critical reviews. It holds a score of 77 out of 100 on the review aggregator website Metacritic, indicating "generally favorable reviews".

== Track listing ==
All music by Robert Forster and Grant McLennan.

1. "Magic in Here" (lyrics, McLennan) – 3:52
2. "Spirit" (lyrics, Forster) – 3:59
3. "The Clock" (lyrics, McLennan) – 4:06
4. "German Farmhouse" (lyrics, Forster) – 3:51
5. "He Lives My Life" (lyrics, Forster) – 3:58
6. "Heart and Home" (lyrics, McLennan) – 3:13
7. "Surfing Magazines" (lyrics, Forster) – 4:34
8. "Orpheus Beach" (lyrics, McLennan) – 4:48
9. "Going Blind" (lyrics, McLennan) – 2:56
10. "When She Sang About Angels" (lyrics, Forster) – 4:31

== Personnel ==
The Go-Betweens

- Grant McLennan – vocals, guitar
- Robert Forster – vocals, guitar, organ
- Adele Pickvance – bass, vocals
- Janet Weiss – drums, vocals
- Sam Coomes – keyboards

Additional personnel

- Carrie Brownstein – guitar on "Going Blind"
- Corin Tucker – vocals on "Going Blind"
- Brent Arnold – cello
- Jen Chorowhas – violin
