= Cattle and Cane =

1983 single by The Go-Betweens

- 7" single cover

Single by the Go-Betweens

from the album Before Hollywood
- B-side: "Heaven Says"
- Released: February 1983
- Recorded: October 1982
- Studio: I.C.C. (Eastbourne, England)
- Genre: Alternative rock
- Length: 4:12
- Label: Rough Trade
- Songwriters: Grant McLennan, Robert Forster
- Producer: John Brand

The Go-Betweens singles chronology
| "Hammer the Hammer" (1982) | "Cattle and Cane" (1983) | "Man O'Sand to Girl O'Sea" (1983) |

"Cattle and Cane" is a song by the Australian alternative rock band the Go-Betweens, released as the first single from their second album Before Hollywood. It was released as a single in the United Kingdom by Rough Trade Records in February 1983 and reached No. 4 on the UK Independent Chart. The single and album were both released in Australia on Stunn, a small label allied with EMI. The Stunn pressings were of poor quality and their distribution limited.

Vocalist and bass guitarist Grant McLennan wrote the lyrics for his mother as an autobiographical description of his return home to a Queensland farm when a boy. He used Nick Cave's acoustic guitar while staying at Cave's London apartment. Vocalist and guitarist Robert Forster co-wrote the song. Drummer Lindy Morrison also supplied backing vocals. The single and album both failed to appear on the relevant Australian Kent Music Report Top 50 charts. In May 2001, "Cattle and Cane" was selected by Australasian Performing Right Association (APRA) as one of the Top 30 Australian songs of all time.

== Background ==
"Cattle and Cane" was recorded by the Go-Betweens in October 1982 at I.C.C. Studios in Eastbourne, United Kingdom, with John Brand producing. Formed in Brisbane in 1977, the band signed with Missing Link Records in 1981 with the line-up of Robert Forster on vocals, lead guitar and rhythm guitar; Grant McLennan on vocals, bass guitar and guitars; and Lindy Morrison on drums and backing vocals. Their debut album, Send Me a Lullaby, was released as an eight-track in Australia in November. It was expanded with four bonus tracks when released in the UK on Rough Trade Records in February 1982.

The Go-Betweens released "Cattle and Cane" in late February 1983, ahead of their second album, Before Hollywood, which appeared in May. The single and album were both released in Australia on Stunn, a small label allied with EMI. The Stunn pressings were of poor quality and their distribution limited. The B-side on the Stunn recordings was "Man O'Sand to Girl O'Sea" with newly joined bass guitarist Robert Vickers on board, which freed McLennan for lead guitar work. The group recorded a video for the single in May, six weeks after its UK release. It was filmed in an antique shop in Fulham, with Vickers miming playing the bass guitar, to portray group solidarity, even though he didn't play on the actual recording.

== Song development ==
"Cattle and Cane" is an autobiographical story of McLennan as a schoolboy embarked on a journey home, evoking memories of a "house of tin and timber," the train edging him closer to the past "through fields of cattle, through fields of cane." McLennan wrote it while using Nick Cave's acoustic guitar in Cave's London apartment in 1982, whilst Cave was comatose after injecting heroin.

In 1983, McLennan described writing the song:

I wrote (the song) to please my mother. She hasn't heard it yet because my mother and stepfather live (on a cattle station) and they can't get 240 volts electricity there, so I have to sing it over the phone to her [...] I don't like the word nostalgic; to me, it's a sloppy yearning for the past, and I'm not trying to do that in that song. I'm just trying to put three vignettes of a person, who's a lot like myself, growing up in Queensland, and just juxtaposing that against how I am now.

Lindy Morrison later said:

Grant was incredibly homesick for the first couple of years we were in England and he spent those first couple of years thinking about his past. He was obsessed with it. A lot of those songs on Before Hollywood have the imagery of Australia. I think "Cattle and Cane" is a master song.

The Canberra Times noted, "The three verses by McLennan cover three phases of his life to date in a series of images – the primary schoolboy scrambling through cane fields, the adolescent in boarding school losing his late father's watch in the showers, the young man at university discovering a bigger brighter world – and then the fourth phase of his life: Robert Forster, playing himself."

A feature of the song is the unusual time signature used in most it, which is explained by Morrison in a radio interview: "Grant had written that song and [...] he wrote it in that time signature. It's a bar of five, then a bar of two, then a bar of four, so the phrase is eleven beats [...] but when you get to the chorus it goes to four-four. The final section is [...] over the verse chord [...] back into the eleven pattern." McLennan had already acknowledged the importance of Morrison's drum part on the song: "It had a great rhythm which I don't think any drummer in the world could've played except her. That rhythm never ceases to amaze me."

Forster later said, "Grant managed to create something new in the Australian songbook with 'Cattle and Cane.' When he first played me the riff I thought it was like one of a number of his that were good, but it was the lyric that did it. The music is quite sort of post-punky, but the lyric is just like Slim Dusty, it's Banjo Paterson or something."

== Reception and influence ==
"Cattle and Cane" reached No. 4 on the UK Independent Charts in 1983. The single and album both failed to appear on the relevant Australian Kent Music Report Top 50 charts. However, "Cattle and Cane"'s popularity saw it reach No. 11 in Triple J's Hottest 100 for 1989, No. 27 in 1990 and No. 96 in 1991. The song was also selected by NME writers in their "100 Best Indie Singles Ever" in 1992.

In AllMusic's review of Before Hollywood, Ned Raggett described the single:

Arguably the band's absolute highlight of its earliest years and one of the early-'80s' utter classics, the combination of McLennan's nostalgia-laden but not soppy lyric, his flat-out lovely singing and overdubbed backing vocals, and the catchy, beautifully elegant acoustic/electric arrangement is simply to die for.

Fellow Australian musician Paul Kelly recalled hearing the song for the first time while driving in Melbourne:

My skin started tingling, and I had to pull over ... [it] had an odd, jerky time signature which acted as a little trip-switch into another world – weird and heavenly and deeply familiar all at once ... I could smell that song ... What planet was this from? When did The Stranglers go to northern Queensland and get all arty?

Reviewed in Melody Maker, Edwyn Collins said, "A monumental record. On first hearing, this isn't immediately impressive. But it's actually very, very insidious. On repeated plays I find it very moving. I think the Go-Betweens are the most perceptive writers since Blonde on Blonde-era Dylan."

In May 2001, "Cattle and Cane" was selected by Australasian Performing Right Association (APRA) as one of the Top 30 Australian songs of all time.

"Cattle and Cane" was covered by British indie rock group the Wedding Present as a B-side to their 1992 single "Blue Eyes" and by Jimmy Little on his ARIA award winning 1999 album The Messenger.

== Track listing ==
UK release

1. "Cattle and Cane" (McLennan, Forster) – 4:12
2. "Heaven Says" (McLennan, Forster) – 4:06

Australian release

1. "Cattle and Cane" (McLennan, Forster) – 4:12
2. "Man O'Sand to Girl O'Sea" – 3:24

== Personnel ==
The Go-Betweens members

- Robert Forster – vocals, lead guitar, rhythm guitar
- Grant McLennan – vocals, bass guitar, guitars
- Lindy Morrison – drums, backing vocals
- Robert Vickers – bass guitar on "Man O'Sand to Girl O'Sea"

Additional musicians

- Bernard Clarke – organ, piano

Production details

- Producer – John Brand
- Engineer – John Brand, Tony Cohen
- Mastering – Ian Cooper
- Tape transfer – Ingo Vauk
- Studio – I.C.C. Studios, Eastbourne, England

== Releases ==
| Format | Country | Label | Catalogue No. | Year |
| 7" single | UK | Rough Trade | RT 124 | February 1983 |
| 7" single | AUS | Rough Trade | RTANZ 007 (Promotional release) | 1983 |
| 7" single | AUS | Stunn | BFA 952 | 1983 |
