= Robert Forster (musician) =

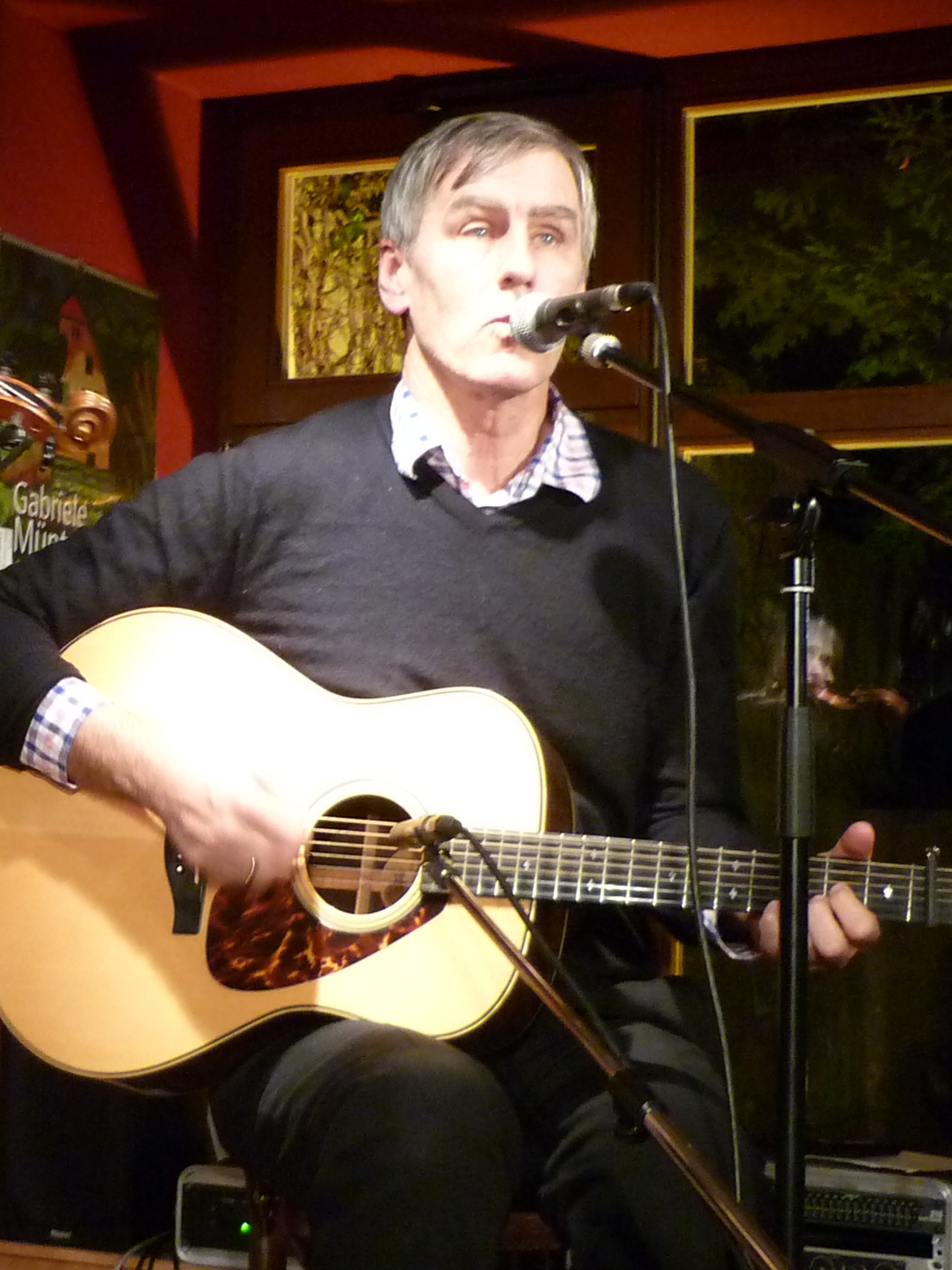
- Forster performing at Dombrowsky Bookstore, Regensburg, Germany, in December 2012

Background information
- Born: Robert Derwent Garth Forster; 29 June 1957 (age 69); Brisbane, Queensland, Australia
- Genres: Pop; country; indie rock
- Occupations: Musician; music critic
- Instruments: Vocals; guitar
- Labels: Beggars Banquet; Shock; Concubine; Yep Roc
- Website: robertforster.net

Robert Derwent Garth Forster (born 29 June 1957) is an Australian singer-songwriter, guitarist and music critic. In December 1977 he co-founded an indie rock group, the Go-Betweens, with fellow musician Grant McLennan. In 1980, Lindy Morrison joined the group on drums and backing vocals, and by 1981 Forster and Morrison were also lovers. In 1988, "Streets of Your Town", co-written by McLennan and Forster, became the band's highest-charting hit in both Australia and the United Kingdom. The follow-up single, "Was There Anything I Could Do?", was a number-16 hit on the Billboard Modern Rock Tracks chart in the United States. In December 1989, after recording six albums, the Go-Betweens disbanded. Forster and Morrison had separated as a couple earlier, and Forster began his solo music career from 1990.

Forster's solo studio albums are Danger in the Past (1990), Calling from a Country Phone (1993), I Had a New York Girlfriend (1995), Warm Nights (1996), The Evangelist (2008), Songs To Play (2015), Inferno (2019), The Candle and the Flame (2023) and Strawberries (2025). AllMusic's Stewart Mason described him as having "a knack for crafty pop songs along with the brooding ballads he contributed to the Go-Betweens' albums, and his solo career has shown a healthy mix of the two styles". From 2000 to 2006, the Go-Betweens reformed and issued three more studio albums before Grant McLennan died on 6 May 2006, of a heart attack. In May 2001 "Cattle and Cane", from the Go-Between's Before Hollywood (1983), was selected by Australasian Performing Right Association (APRA) as one of the Top 30 Australian songs of all time. In 2008, 16 Lovers Lane (1988) was highlighted on Special Broadcasting Service (SBS) TV's The Great Australian Albums series as a classic example of 1980s rock music. Forster began writing as a music critic in 2005 for national current affairs magazine The Monthly and a columnist for its sister publication The Saturday Paper in 2014.

For his debut solo album, Danger in the Past, Forster was backed on vocals by Karin Bäumler of German pop group Baby You Know. In the early 1990s Forster and Bäumler married; the couple has two children.

A portrait of Forster, by the artist known as what, won the 2019 Doug Moran National Portrait Prize.

== Biography ==
Robert Derwent Garth Forster was born on 29 June 1957 and grew up in Brisbane. His father was a fitter and turner, and his mother taught physical education. He attended Brisbane Grammar School in Spring Hill, where he started to learn guitar and wrote poetry. In 1975, he formed the Mosquitoes with Stephen Hollingsworth and the following year he was in the Godots with Malcolm Kelly. In 1976 Forster met Grant McLennan in drama classes in his second year at the University of Queensland; they were both fans of Bob Dylan and the New York music scene. Forster enjoyed music by Mott the Hoople, Patti Smith, Ry Cooder, and the Velvet Underground. In December 1977, the pair co-founded an indie rock group, the Go-Betweens, with Forster on guitar and McLennan on bass guitar, and both as singer-songwriters. Later Forster also provided keyboards and McLennan took up guitar.

=== The Go-Betweens ===
In May 1978 Forster's first recorded work was the group's debut single, "Lee Remick", released in September that year on the Able Label. It was a paean to the Hollywood actress of the same name. Forster later recalled "I didn't have a girlfriend or any sort of romantic side to my life ... I wanted to write a love song. But who was I in love with? No-one. I had to find someone and I found Lee Remick". He also wrote the B-side, "Karen", as an ode to the university's library staff, "[t]here was kindness in the library, then you walk out of the library into the harsh real world". Forster then wrote their second single, "People Say". According to Australian musicologist Ian McFarlane, both singles were "sparsely produced, poorly played yet passionately performed folksy, post-punk pop songs. They were sunny, catchy and hopelessly romantic, earning the band immediate local and international acclaim".

In November 1979 the Go-Betweens relocated to London, they re-released their early material and followed with another single on the Scottish label Postcard Records entitled "I Need Two Heads" which was also written by Forster. It peaked at No. 6 on the United Kingdom Independent Charts. The group remained in UK for almost a year but ran out of money and needed a drummer, so they returned to Brisbane. By November 1980 Lindy Morrison (ex-Xero) had joined the group on drums and backing vocals. By 1981 Forster and Morrison were also lovers; she later remembered: "Robert never took part in any group discussions ... He would not stay in the house if there were other people present ... he and I would have cups of tea on the verandah and debate the place of politics in art".

As a member of the Go-Betweens he contributed to all their studio albums, Send Me a Lullaby (February 1982), Before Hollywood (May 1983), Spring Hill Fair (September 1984), Liberty Belle and the Black Diamond Express (March 1986), Tallulah (June 1987) and 16 Lovers Lane (September 1988). Forster and McLennan wrote most of the tracks for the band's albums and alternated lead vocal duties. By December 1989 the group disbanded; Forster and Morrison had separated as a couple earlier and Forster began his solo music career from 1990. Back in 1982, the Go-Betweens' Forster, McLennan and Morrison had recorded "After the Fireworks" as a collaboration with the Birthday Party's Nick Cave on vocals, Mick Harvey on piano and Rowland S. Howard on guitar. It was released that year as a single under the band name Tuff Monks on Au Go Go Records.

=== The Go-Betweens breakup ===
After the disbandment of the Go-Betweens, Forster relocated to Germany in 1990 and recorded his debut solo album, Danger in the Past, in Berlin. It was produced by Harvey (Anita Lane) and issued on Beggars Banquet Records. AllMusic's Ned Raggett found the album showed "literate, understated rock & roll" with his "gently cracked, high vocals" and "setting and maintaining a variety of moods from sudden energy to soft rumination". In November he issued a single, "Baby Stones", from the album. Also that year he provided guitar for German pop group Baby You Know's debut album, To Live Is to Fly. Karin Bäumler featured on violin and vocals on To Live Is to Fly. Bäumler also provided vocals for Forster's Danger in the Past. Forster and Bäumler married in the early 1990s.

By 1993, Forster had returned to Brisbane to record his second solo album, Calling from a Country Phone, at Sunshine Studios with members of local pop group Custard. It was produced by Forster and issued on Shock Records and Beggars Banquet in June. A single, "Drop", had appeared a month ahead of the album. For touring he formed Robert Forster's Silver Backwash with David McCormack on guitar, Robert Moore on bass guitar and Glenn Thompson on drums. Although described as a "bustling country-pop" album by McFarlane, according to AllMusic's Greg Adams, its "folk-rock sound ... recalls Felt's Me and a Monkey on the Moon more than ... Nashville". Forster also produced his third solo album, I Had a New York Girlfriend, which is a collection of cover versions recorded in Melbourne in 1994. Raggett felt it was "an interesting and at times defiantly anti-hip visit through a surprising, entertaining selection of songs".

By 1995, Forster had formed a three-piece group, Warm Nights, with Thompson and Adele Pickvance on bass guitar. Late that year, Forster and McLennan performed together in Brisbane and the duo were accompanied by Pickvance and Thompson. Forster denied it was a tribute show: "anyone that did the Australian Go-Betweens Show would be tighter ... people that start those [tribute] bands generally play a lot tighter than the bands that they're honouring or copying or whatever". In May the following year the same line-up performed at Les Inrockuptibles's 10th anniversary celebration in Paris.

Forster's next solo album, Warm Nights, was recorded in London in 1996 and produced by Edwyn Collins (the Proclaimers, Vic Godard, A House) – Collins also provided guitar alongside a five-member brass section. The rhythm section were Pickvance and Thompson. It appeared in September that year and McFarlane described it as "a laid-back collection of summery pop". Raggett found it is "a touch less obviously country-pitched in comparison – more of the deft, understated rock/pop". The album's lead single, "Cryin' Love", included a music video which McFarlane states is "one of the most entertaining film clips for the year". In mid-1997 Forster and McLennan briefly reformed the Go-Betweens for a series of gigs in the UK and Ireland.

=== The Go-Betweens reformation ===
In 2000, after both Forster and McLennan had each recorded four solo albums, the Go-Betweens reformed with Pickvance to create a new studio album, The Friends of Rachel Worth; they were assisted by Janet Weiss (Sleater-Kinney, Quasi) on drums and backing vocals and Sam Coomes (Quasi) on keyboards. It was issued in September with Bäumler credited for string arrangements, and production duties shared by Coomes, Forster, McLennan and Weiss. Allmusic's Hal Horowitz praised their "[p]oetic, languid, spoken/sung vocals similar to Lou Reed weave between lovely melodies whose appeal unfolds with repeated listens"; however it "sounds more like a combination of two solo albums rather than one from a cohesive unit". The Village Voice's critic, Robert Christgau, described them as "rather than lyric poets, as I once thought, Forster and McLennan are better conceived as short-story writers, with the concreteness and forward motion of voices and music compensating for imagistic technique and low word count". He declared that Forster's tracks "are the catchiest and most fetching tracks on the album, taking up surfing dreams, a fond and funny envoi to Patti Smith, and a life-swapping fable that when you think about it may be a love song after all".

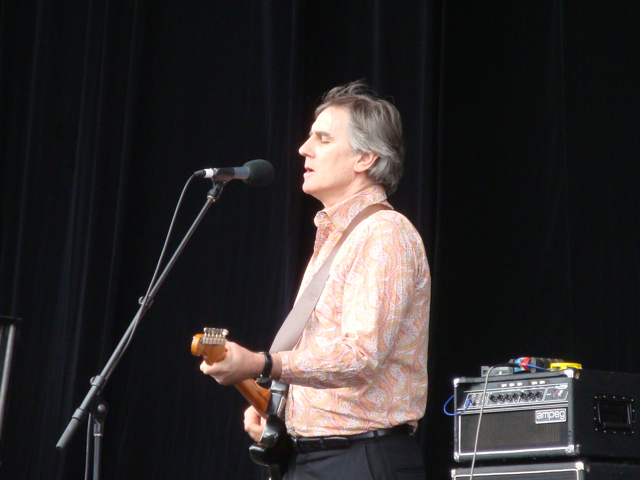
Forster performing at All Tomorrow's Parties, Mt Buller, Victoria, on 10 January 2009.

The Go-Betweens line-up of Forster, McLennan, Pickvance and Thompson (he had rejoined in 2001) issued two more studio albums, Bright Yellow Bright Orange (2003) and Oceans Apart (2005), AllMusic's Stewart Mason described Forster as having "a knack for crafty pop songs along with the brooding ballads he contributed to the Go-Betweens' albums, and his solo career has shown a healthy mix of the two styles". Grant McLennan died on 6 May 2006 of a heart attack, aged 48.

=== Solo career ===
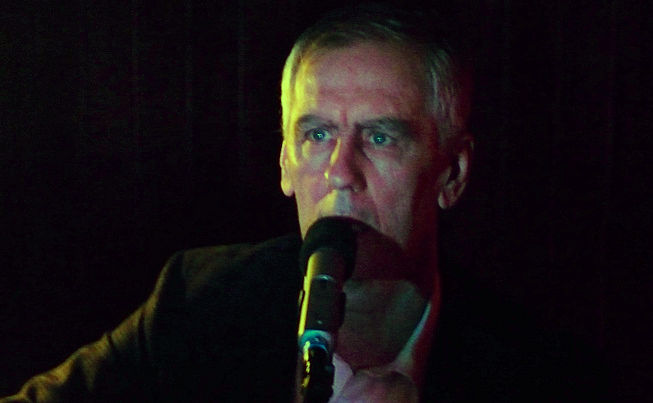
Robert Forster performing at King George, Cologne (Germany), on 10 November 2017.

In July 2007, Forster resumed his solo music career with live performances over four nights at the Queensland Music Festival. He picked three songs co-written with McLennan, including "Demon Days", which is the last track the pair wrote together, and recorded them alongside his own material for his first solo album in 11 years, The Evangelist, which was released on 26 April 2008 through Yep Roc Records. It had been recorded with Pickvance and Thompson at Good Luck Studios, London, from September to November 2007 (except a track, "A Place to Hide Away"). Allmusic's Thom Jurek noted that Forster "has never been this direct before, so unadorned and honest, and yes, vulnerable without the mask of his gift to weave a story, even in first person, and make himself seem a narrator".

In reference to a show in Whelan's, Dublin Review of Books has described Forster as "a cypher, a vague energy field of the gangly, playful and camp. A gent draped in the garb of satire, he was the second pillar of The Go-Betweens: he stood on stage, a dandy staring into the middle distance, a mild-mannered mockery of rock ‘n’ roll in his performance but plenty of poetics in his heart."

== Music journalism ==
Since May 2005, Forster has had a parallel career as a music critic, he began writing for the Australian magazine, The Monthly and its sister publication The Saturday Paper in 2014. Previously he had virtually no print experience, with only a column on hair care for a fanzine in the 1980s to his credit. He was asked by then-editor of The Monthly, Christian Ryan, to write a regular column. Forster later recalled "[m]usic journalism was something that always interested me but only as a reader. I thought about music and I would almost run ideas through my head when I listened to a record or saw a concert, but I never put any of thoughts to paper". On 25 October 2006 Forster won the Pascall Prize for Critical Writing for his columns. In 2009 he collated some of his critiques, written from 2005 to 2009, on international artists The Rolling Stones, Nana Mouskouri, Neil Diamond and Cat Power as well as Australian acts Nick Cave and the Bad Seeds, Mark Seymour and Paul Kelly. It was published as The 10 Rules of Rock and Roll: Collected Music Writings 2005–09 on Black Inc books.

== Musical legacy ==
In May 2001, "Cattle and Cane", co-written by Forster and McLennan, from The Go-Between's Before Hollywood (1983), was selected by Australasian Performing Right Association (APRA) as one of the Top 30 Australian songs of all time. In 2008, 16 Lovers Lane (1988) was highlighted on Special Broadcasting Service (SBS) TV's The Great Australian Albums series as a classic example of 1980s rock music. On 25 June 2010, the Brisbane City Council celebrated the opening of the Go Between Bridge with a concert featuring performances by Forster, Angus & Julia Stone, Josh Pyke and Bob Evans. In May 2013 Forster performed at Primera Persona, Barcelona, he was backed by local indie musicians, Part Company. He described his writing to Time Out Barcelona's Marta Salicrú "[m]y work is very autobiographical – I'm a singer-songwriter ... My songs reflect on and talk about my life and how I've lived it. But I'm not one of those lyricists who explains everything. My stories aren't obvious. There are some singer-songwriters who say too much". His repertoire included new songs, which he hoped to record.

== Bibliography ==
Articles

- "The Exford Dregs," The Monthly, 11, April 2006
- "A True Hipster," The Monthly, 14, July 2006
- "Modern Times and Times Before That," The Monthly, 17, October 2006
- "The Coronation of Normie Rowe," Meanjin, volume 65, number 3, 2006, pp. 48–52.
- "Love Goes to a Building on Fire," The Monthly, 21, March 2007, pp. 58–60.
- Forster, Robert (April 2009). "Thoughts in the middle of a career". The Monthly. 44: 62–64. Reviews Paul Kelly's Songs from the South and Songs from the South Volume 2.

Books

- Forster, Robert; McLennan, Grant; The Go-Betweens (2008). The Go-Betweens : history, lyric, songbook : the songs of Robert Forster and Grant McLennan. New York: Schott. ISBN 978-3-7957-5826-4.
- Forster, Robert (2009). The 10 rules of rock and roll: collected music writings 2005–09. Black Inc. ISBN 978-1-86395-450-1.
- Forster, Robert (2016). Grant & I: Inside and outside the Go-Betweens. Penguin Books Australia. ISBN 978-0-67007-822-6.

== Discography ==
=== Solo albums ===
Title	Details
Danger in the Past	Released: 1990; Label: Beggars Banquet; Format: CD, LP, cassette
Calling from a Country Phone	Released: 1993; Label: Beggars Banquet; Format: CD, cassette
I Had a New York Girlfriend	Released: 1994; Label: Beggars Banquet; Format: CD, cassette; Reissued in 2024 as Beautiful Hearts on Needle Mythology
Warm Nights	Released: 1996; Label: Beggars Banquet; Format: CD, LP
The Evangelist	Released: 2008; Label: Capitol; Format: CD, LP, digital
Songs to Play	Released: 2015; Label: Tapete; Format: CD, LP, digital
Inferno	Released: 2019; Label: Tapete; Format: CD, LP, digital
The Candle and the Flame	Released: 3 February 2023; Label: EMI Music Australia; Format: CD, LP, digital
Strawberries	Released: 23 May 2025; Label: Tapete Records; Format: CD, LP, digital

=== Compilation albums ===
Title	Details
Intermission: The Best of the Solo Recordings 1990-1997 (with Grant McLennan)	Released: 2007; Label: Beggars Banquet / EMI; Format: CD, Cassette

=== Other appearances ===
- Songs for the Young at Heart (2007) – contributed "Uncle Sigmund's Clockwork Storybook"
- I'm Your Fan: The Songs of Leonard Cohen (1991) – contributed "Tower of Song"

=== With Go-Betweens ===
- See The Go-Betweens

== Filmography ==
- Prüfstand VII as Ferryman (2001)
- Big Gold Dream (documentary) as narrator (2015)

== Awards ==
=== ARIA Music Awards ===
The ARIA Music Awards is an annual awards ceremony held by the Australian Recording Industry Association. They commenced in 1987.

Year	Nominee / work	Award	Result
2008	The Evangelist	Best Adult Contemporary Album	Nominated
2016	Songs to Play	Best Adult Contemporary Album	Nominated

=== Queensland Music Awards ===
The Queensland Music Awards (previously known as Q Song Awards) are annual awards celebrating Queensland, Australia's brightest emerging artists and established legends. They commenced in 2006.

Year	Nominee / work	Award	Result (wins only)
2008	"From Ghost Town"	Published song of the Year	Won
