= Lloyd Cole discography =

- Studio albums: 16
- Live albums: 7
- Compilation albums: 7
- Singles: 26

This article includes the albums and singles released by both Lloyd Cole as a solo artist and the recordings of his band Lloyd Cole and the Commotions, and with his next band Lloyd Cole and the Negatives.

== Lloyd Cole and the Commotions discography ==
=== Studio albums ===
Title	Album details	Peak chart positions				Certification
Title	Album details	UK	AUS	CAN	SWE	Certification
Rattlesnakes	Released: October 1984; Label: Polydor, Geffen, Capitol	13	28	68	25	BPI: Gold
Easy Pieces	Released: 22 November 1985; Label: Polydor, Geffen, Capitol	5	14	77	25	BPI: Gold
Mainstream	Released: 26 October 1987; Label: Polydor, Capitol	9	54	—	31	BPI: Gold

=== Compilation albums ===
Title	Album details	Peak chart positions		Certification
Title	Album details	UK	AUS	Certification
1984–1989	Released: March 1989; Label: Polydor, Capitol	14	85	BPI: Gold
Lloyd Cole. The Commotions. The Singles	Released: 2004; Label: Universal	—	—	
Don't Look Back – An Introduction to Lloyd Cole and Lloyd Cole and the Commotions	Released: 2015; Label: Spectrum, Universal	—	—	

=== Live albums ===
Title	Album details
Live at the Hammersmith Apollo, London (2004)	Released: 14 November 2004; Label: Instant Live, Demon
Live at the BBC, Volume 1 (1984)	Released: August 2007; Label: Universal, Capitol
Live at the BBC, Volume 2 (1985/86)	Released: August 2007; Label: Universal, Capitol
Live at the BBC (1990/95)	Released: August 2007; Label: Universal, Mercury

=== Singles ===
Title	Year	Peak chart positions					Album
Title	Year	UK	AUS	IRE	NL	US Alt	Album
"Perfect Skin"	1984	26	54	—	—	—	Rattlesnakes
"Forest Fire"	1984	41	87	—	—	—	Rattlesnakes
"Rattlesnakes"	1984	65	59	—	31	—	Rattlesnakes
"Brand New Friend"	1985	19	73	11	—	—	Easy Pieces
"Lost Weekend"	1985	17	49	10	—	—	Easy Pieces
"Cut Me Down" (Remix)	1986	38	—	12	—	—	Easy Pieces
"Rich" (Europe only)	1986	—	—	—	—	—	Easy Pieces
"My Bag"	1987	46	—	20	—	13	Mainstream
"Jennifer She Said"	1988	31	—	27	—	—	Mainstream
"From the Hip"	1988	59	—	—	—	—	Mainstream

== Solo discography ==
=== Studio albums ===
Title	Album details	Peak chart positions					Certification
Title	Album details	UK	AUS	FRA	GER	SWE	Certification
Lloyd Cole	Released: 19 February 1990; Label: Polydor	11	49	—	38	6	BPI: Silver
Don't Get Weird on Me Babe	Released: 16 September 1991; Label: Polydor	21	108	—	—	7	
Bad Vibes	Released: 11 October 1993; Label: Polydor	38	—	—	—	8	
Love Story	Released: 25 September 1995; Label: Polydor	27	—	—	—	9	
The Negatives	Released: November 2000; Label: Mercury Records Ltd 1998 / XIII Bis Records 2000	-	—	—	—	-	
Plastic Wood	Released: June 2001; Label: The Establishment / XIII Bis / One Little Indian	—	—	—	—	—	
Music in a Foreign Language	Released: 9 May 2003; Label: Sanctuary	114	—	—	—	—	
Antidepressant	Released: August 2006; Label: Sanctuary	156	—	152	—	20	
Broken Record	Released: February 2010; Label: Tapete	150	—	—	58	12	
Standards	Released: June 2013; Label: Tapete	74	—	—	98	22	
1D Electronics 2012–2014	Released: September 2015; Label: Bureau B	—	—	—	—	—	
Guesswork	Released: 26 July 2019; Label: Edel AG	75	—	—	93	—	
On Pain	Released: 23 June 2023; Label: Edel AG	—	—	—	—	—	

=== Compilation albums ===
Title	Album details	Peak chart positions		
Title	Album details	UK	SWE	SCO
The Collection	Released: 4 May 1998; Label: Universal	24	56	12
2001 – Collected Recordings 1996–2000	Released: June 2001; Label: various	—	—	—
Etc.	Released: 4 October 2001; Label: The Establishment / XIII Bis / One Little Indian	—	—	—
Cleaning Out the Ashtrays (Collected B-Sides & Rarities 1989–2006)	Released: May 2009; Label: Tapete	—	—	

=== Live albums ===
Title	Album details
Radio Bremen: Folksinger Volume 1	Released: 30 January 2009; Label: Tapete
The Whelan: Folksinger Volume 2	Released: 30 January 2009; Label: Tapete
My Austere Demeanour: Folksinger Volume 3	Released: 2018; Label: Tapete

=== Singles ===
Title	Year	Peak chart positions			Album
Title	Year	UK	AUS	US Alt	Album
"No Blue Skies"	1990	42	86	—	Lloyd Cole
"Don't Look Back"	1990	59	—	—	Lloyd Cole
"Downtown"	1990	—	—	5	Lloyd Cole
"She's a Girl and I'm a Man"	1991	55	149	7	Don't Get Weird on Me Babe
"Weeping Wine"	1991	91	—	—	Don't Get Weird on Me Babe
"Butterfly"	1992	90	—	—	Don't Get Weird on Me Babe
"So You'd Like to Save the World"	1993	72	—	—	Bad Vibes
"Morning Is Broken"	1993	83	—	—	Bad Vibes
"Like Lovers Do"	1995	24	—	—	Love Story
"Sentimental Fool"	1995	73	—	—	Love Story
"Baby"	1996	99	—	—	Love Story
"That Boy"	1998	—	—	—	Collection
"No More Love Songs"	2003	—	—	—	Music in a Foreign Language
"Writers Retreat!"	2010	—	—	—	Broken Record
"Period Piece"	2013	—	—	—	Standards
"Violins"	2019	—	—	—	Guesswork

=== Other charting songs ===
- "Tell Your Sister" – number 6 on the US Billboard Modern Rock Tracks in 1992.

== Lloyd Cole and the Negatives discography ==
=== Studio albums ===
Title	Album details
The Negatives	Released: 2000; Label: XIII Bis

=== Singles ===
Title	Year	Album
"Impossible Girl"	2000	The Negatives
