= 1984–1989 =

Compilation album by Lloyd Cole and the Commotions
- Released: 28 March 1989
- Length: 52:39
- Label: Polydor; Capitol
- Producer: Paul Hardiman; Clive Langer; Alan Winstanley; Ian Stanley

Lloyd Cole and the Commotions chronology
Mainstream (1987)	1984–1989 (1989)

1984–1989 is the first compilation album by the British band Lloyd Cole and the Commotions, released on 28 March 1989 through Polydor Records in the UK. It compiles material released by the band on their three studio albums, Rattlesnakes (1984), Easy Pieces (1985), and Mainstream (1987). It reached the top 20 in the UK and was certified gold by the British Phonographic Industry (BPI).

== Critical reception ==
Professional ratings
Review scores
Source	Rating
AllMusic	4.5/5 stars

Mike DeGagne of AllMusic wrote that with the Commotions, Cole "produced a number of melody-ridden songs that are best accessed on 1984–1989, a collection of their finest material", going on to say that the compilation "really does gather the cream of their music, and each song relinquishes a clean, robust sound" that has the "bright jangle of guitar that's hitched to palatable pop tempos" and "used polished instrumentation behind elements of subdued '80s Europop". DeGagne concluded: "Relatively unknown in North America, Lloyd Cole and the Commotions contributed to some of the finest music to ever hover with pop ease, and this compilation lines up his best work all in one place."

== Track listing ==
1984–1989 track listing
No.	Title	Original album	Length
1.	"Perfect Skin"	Rattlesnakes (1984)	3:11
2.	"Are You Ready to Be Heartbroken?"	Rattlesnakes	3:03
3.	"Forest Fire" (remix)	Rattlesnakes	5:09
4.	"You Will Never Be No Good"	Rattlesnakes	2:39
5.	"Rattlesnakes"	Rattlesnakes	3:25
6.	"Perfect Blue"	Easy Pieces (1985)	4:15
7.	"Brand New Friend"	Easy Pieces	4:51
8.	"Cut Me Down"	Easy Pieces	4:27
9.	"Lost Weekend"	Easy Pieces	3:14
10.	"Her Last Fling"	Easy Pieces	2:43
11.	"Mr. Malcontent"	Mainstream (1987)	4:49
12.	"My Bag"	Mainstream	3:54
13.	"Jennifer She Said"	Mainstream	3:01
14.	"From the Hip"	Mainstream	3:58
Total length:			52:39

== Charts ==
Chart performance for 1984–1989
Chart (1989)	Peak position
Australian Albums (Australian Music Report)	85
European Albums (Eurotipsheet)	50
UK Albums (OCC)	14

== Certifications ==
Certifications for 1984–1989
Region	Certification	Certified units/sales
United Kingdom (BPI)	Gold	100,000^{^}
^{^} Shipments figures based on certification alone.
