= Cut Me Down =

1985 song by Lloyd Cole and the Commotions

Single by Lloyd Cole and the Commotions

from the album Easy Pieces
- B-side: "Are You Ready to Be Heartbroken?"
- Released: 10 January 1986
- Studio: Westside Studios (Shepherd's Bush, London)
- Length: 4:30 (album version); 4:18 (single version); 6:05 (extended version)
- Label: Polydor
- Songwriter: Lloyd Cole
- Producers: Clive Langer; Alan Winstanley

Lloyd Cole and the Commotions singles chronology
"Lost Weekend" (1985)	"Cut Me Down" (1986)	"Rich" (1986)

Music video
- "Cut Me Down" on YouTube

"Cut Me Down" is a song by the British rock and pop band Lloyd Cole and the Commotions, released on 10 January 1986 by Polydor Records as the third single from their second studio album, Easy Pieces (1985). The song was written by Lloyd Cole and produced by Clive Langer and Alan Winstanley. It peaked at number 38 on the UK singles chart and remained in the top 75 for four weeks.

== Background ==
In a 2009 interview with Time Out, Cole said, "'Cut Me Down' was a lovely song, just three chords, which was ruined by the arrangement we gave it."

== Critical reception ==
Upon its release, Karen Swayne of Number One felt "Cut Me Down" was a welcome choice as a single after its "too-jaunty" predecessor "Lost Weekend". She commented, "It's a return to what he does best – all moody angst and careworn vocals alongside a dreamy beat." She added, "It may be too low key to win him any new supporters, but the bedsit brigade will be kept entertained." James Belsey of the Bristol Evening Post picked it as the newspaper's "single of the week" and described it as "subtle, elegantly thoughtful music with an infectious lilt". Andy Hurt of Sounds was negative in his review, remarking that Cole "wimps out his latest A-level essay in anaemic pop."

== Track listing ==
7–inch single (UK, Europe and Australasia)

1. "Cut Me Down" (Remix) – 4:18
2. "Are You Ready to Be Heartbroken?" (Live – September '85) – 2:50

7–inch limited edition double pack single (UK)

1. "Cut Me Down" (Remix) – 4:18
2. "Are You Ready to Be Heartbroken?" (Live – September '85) – 2:50
3. "Perfect Blue" (Instrumental) – 4:16
4. "Forest Fire" (Live – December '84) – 4:41

12-inch single (UK, Europe and Australasia)

1. "Cut Me Down" (Extended Remix) – 6:05
2. "Cut Me Down" (7" Remix) – 4:18
3. "Are You Ready to Be Heartbroken?" (Live) – 2:50
4. "Forest Fire" (Live) – 4:41

12-inch single (Canada)

1. "Cut Me Down" (Extended Remix) – 6:05
2. "Lost Weekend" (Extended Mix) – 4:20
3. "Forest Fire" (Live) – 4:23
4. "Perfect Skin" (Live) – 3:00

== Personnel ==
Lloyd Cole and the Commotions

- Lloyd Cole – vocals, guitar
- Neil Clark – guitar
- Blair Cowan – keyboards
- Lawrence Donegan – bass
- Stephen Irvine – drums

Production

- Clive Langer – producer ("Cut Me Down", "Perfect Blue"), remixer ("Cut Me Down", "Perfect Blue")
- Alan Winstanley – producer ("Cut Me Down", "Perfect Blue"), remixer ("Cut Me Down", "Perfect Blue")
- Pete Dauncey – producer of "Are You Ready to Be Heartbroken? (Live)"
- Paul Nixon – producer of "Are You Ready to Be Heartbroken? (Live)"
- The Commotions – producers of "Forest Fire" (Live) and "Perfect Skin" (Live)

Other

- Peter Anderson – sleeve
- Clare Cameron – sleeve

== Charts ==
Chart (1986)	Peak position
Europe (European Hot 100 Singles)	92
Ireland (IRMA)	12
New Zealand (Recorded Music NZ)	49
UK Singles (Official Charts)	38
