= Mainstream (Lloyd Cole and the Commotions album) =

1987 studio album by Lloyd Cole and the Commotions

Studio album by Lloyd Cole and the Commotions
- Released: 26 October 1987
- Length: 40:02
- Label: Polydor (UK and Europe); Capitol (US)
- Producer: Ian Stanley

Lloyd Cole and the Commotions chronology
Easy Pieces (1985)	Mainstream (1987)	1984–1989 (1989)

Singles from Mainstream
- 1. "My Bag" Released: 21 September 1987; 2. "Jennifer She Said" Released: 28 December 1987; 3. "From the Hip" Released: 11 April 1988

Mainstream is the third and final studio album by Lloyd Cole and the Commotions. It was produced by Ian Stanley and released by Polydor Records in the UK and by Capitol Records in the US on 26 October 1987. It included the singles "My Bag", "Jennifer She Said" and "From the Hip". Although the album reached number nine in the UK, it failed to chart in the US and was not embraced by all critics: Mainstream is the only Lloyd Cole and the Commotions album not to sell at least 100,000 copies in the US.

== Recording ==
Finding a producer proved difficult for the band. They first went with Chris Thomas, when that did not work out they brought in Stewart Copeland. With Copeland they only recorded one track, "Hey Rusty", then finally found Ian Stanley, famous for his work with Tears For Fears.

Bass player Lawrence Donegan reflected in 2004 that "with the previous LP, Easy Pieces, we had tried to broaden out and make more of a pop record and it hadn't really worked. It sounded rushed and the songs were not all up to standard. So, a year after Easy Pieces, we went into the studio to try and make something more powerful. But the LP that we actually made took so long that we lost our initial vision by the time we finished it. The songs that Lloyd was writing were more introspective, so the stadium rock idea gradually went out the window."

Mainstream cost £300,000, ten times as much as their 1984 debut album Rattlesnakes, and took five months to record. Keyboardist Blair Cowan had already left the group by the time the album came out (hence his picture is missing from the photographs of the band that feature on the artwork, and only included on a 'dedication' to him on the inner sleeve) and Donegan was also close to calling it a day, having been accepted on a journalism course. As a result the group decided that they had come to a natural end and to split up after the release of the album, but were obliged to promote it and undertake a tour first, which took a year. After the Commotions broke up, Cole moved to New York to resume his songwriting partnership with Cowan and joined up with Fred Maher and Robert Quine, both former associates of Lou Reed, to begin work on a solo career.

== Composition ==
The album's opening track and lead single, "My Bag", contains several allusions to cocaine. Cole said, "I wrote [the song] when I was drunk one night. It's basically about a coked up stockbroker. I took most of the scenarios from that song from Big Lights, Bright City [sic] or things that I'd heard like some executive that we've dealt with getting a phone call from another part of the office saying, 'Come upstairs, it's snowing' which of course meant a whole load of new coke was in. I thought 'a multi-story snowstorm' was quite a nice way to start a song." On the track "From the Hip", Cole laments over his helplessness in combating violence and abuse. "Jennifer She Said" has a Mark Knopfler-like guitar break and is about a newlywed who has lost interest and "last forever love that leads to a tattoo".

"Mr. Malcontent" is based on the character played by Daniel Day-Lewis in My Beautiful Laundrette and is about someone who would rather waste time than face the world. "Sean Penn Blues" is a "cheeky [and] upbeat" tune and "recover[s] the sly wit" of the band's earlier material. The track was inspired by an incident that Cole had read about in which the actor Sean Penn was invited to a poetry reading which turned out to be set up purely to mock him. The song opens with dialogue featuring the voices of Scottish actors Robbie Coltrane and Katy Murphy, taken from the BBC television comedy-drama series Tutti Frutti which had been broadcast seven months before the release of Mainstream.

"Hey Rusty", the one track produced by Stewart Copeland of the Police, has a "Springsteen-like theme and a U2-like musical track". "These Days" has a bassline copied from a track on Mister Heartbreak by Laurie Anderson and has been called "gorgeous [and] melancholic".

== Critical reception ==
Professional ratings
Review scores
Source	Rating
AllMusic	2/5 stars
The Great Rock Discography	5/10
Melody Maker	favourable
NME	8/10
New Straits Times	3/5 stars
Q	4/5 stars
Record-Journal	B
Record Mirror	4.5/5 stars
(The New) Rolling Stone Album Guide	4/5 stars
Sounds	4/5 stars

Although Mainstream was not universally embraced by the press it was favoured by some critics. Q said, "Two years and six producers in the making, Mainstream could have easily appeared suffering from exhaustion and over-production... Mainstream put Lloyd Cole in the enviable position of being on a hat-trick of excellent contemporary pop albums. It is to his credit that he has remained communicative without being verbose and intelligent without being clever-clever." John Williamson of the Evening Times called Mainstream "the band's most accomplished work to-date" and "a major development for the band". In (The New) Rolling Stone Album Guide the album is called Cole's "most well-rounded" and "cleanly produced". Jim Zebora of the Record-Journal gave the album a B and said it "hit with a lot of artistry" but admits Cole's "potential hasn't been reached". RS Murthi of New Straits Times writes that Cole's "rough-hewn vocals...provide a fine contrast to the smooth and buoyant music" and it "bristles with chiming guitars and dulcet synthesizer textures". NME observed that "instead of going mad, these people have overcome mega self-consciousness to make a record they should have made years ago. Mainstream beats most contemporary rock for its wit, intelligence and use of stringed instruments, and it thrashes crateloads of pop on the tunes, production and fun level." Record Mirror considered that calling the album Mainstream was "asking for trouble. It's a statement of intent as well as a nifty way to draw critics' fire before the cries of 'sell out' come your way." The reviewer felt that "the only disappointment is that Mainstream sounds a little too polite at times. You yearn for just one track that will hit you between the shoulder blades with the bare boned intensity of some of their earlier work..." but concluded that overall it was "a flawed (slightly) masterpiece".

On the other hand, Richard Luck of The Rough Guide to Rock writes that Mainstream "was by and large a disappointing affair". William Ruhlmann, in AllMusic, laments that there is "little to alleviate the vitriol in the music". He did favour the track "Hey Rusty" but other than that he believed the songs are not "coherent, specific, [or] moving". The album is described in The Great Rock Discography as "sound[ing] lacklustre in comparison" to their earlier work. Sounds was disappointed, saying, "Unfortunately, by developing his laid-back style, Lloyd has sacrificed some of the urgency and excitement so often present in his tales of seedy weekends and perfect lovers... He's given up pampering the intellectuals and is facing up to the things that are important in his own life. For these changes he can only be applauded, and yet the net result, at moments, seems somewhat lacklustre."

== Track listing ==
All tracks written and composed by Lloyd Cole and the Commotions, except where noted.

1. "My Bag" – 3:56
2. "From the Hip" (Neil Clark, Cole, Blair Cowan, Lawrence Donegan, Stephen Irvine, McKillop) – 3:57
3. "29" – 5:28
4. "Mainstream" – 3:14
5. "Jennifer She Said" – 3:02
6. "Mr. Malcontent" – 4:49
7. "Sean Penn Blues" – 3:28
8. "Big Snake" (lyrics: Cole, music: Ian Stanley) – 5:16
9. "Hey Rusty" – 4:30
10. "These Days" – 2:27

== Personnel ==
Lloyd Cole and the Commotions

- Lloyd Cole – guitar, vocals
- Neil Clark – guitar
- Blair Cowan – keyboards
- Lawrence Donegan – bass
- Stephen Irvine – drums

Additional personnel

- Jon Hassell – trumpet on "Big Snake"
- Nicky Holland – backing vocals on "29", string arrangements on "Jennifer She Said"
- Tony Jackson – backing vocals on "Mainstream"
- John Sloman – backing vocals on "Mainstream"
- Fraser Speirs – harmonica on "Sean Penn Blues"
- Tracey Thorn – vocals on "Big Snake"
- Tommy Willis – lap steel guitar on "29"

Production

- Femi Jiya – engineer
- Ian Stanley – producer
- Bruce Lampcov – mixer
- Stewart Copeland – producer on "Hey Rusty"
- Alastair Thain – photography

== Charts ==
Chart (1987-1988)	Peak position
European Albums (Eurotipsheet)	51
New Zealand Albums (RMNZ)	37
Swedish Albums (Sverigetopplistan)	31
UK Albums (OCC)	9

Singles
Year	Song	Chart	Peak
1987	"My Bag"	UK Singles	46
1987	"My Bag"	Billboard Modern Rock	13
1988	"My Bag"	Billboard Dance	48
1988	"Jennifer She Said"	UK Singles	31
1988	"From the Hip"	UK Singles	59

== Certifications ==
Region	Certification	Certified units/sales
United Kingdom (BPI)	Gold	100,000^{^}
^{^} Shipments figures based on certification alone.

== Release history ==
Region	Date	Label	Format	Catalog
United Kingdom	26 October 1987	Polydor	LP	LCLP 3
United Kingdom	26 October 1987	Polydor	cassette	LCMC 3
Europe	26 October 1987	Polydor	LP	883 691-1
Europe	26 October 1987	Polydor	cassette	883 691-4
United Kingdom and Europe	26 October 1987	Polydor	CD	833 691-2
United States	1987	Capitol	LP	C1-90893
United States	25 October 1990	Capitol	CD	CDP 7 90893 2
