= Rattlesnakes (song) =

1984 song by Lloyd Cole and the Commotions

Single by Lloyd Cole and the Commotions

from the album Rattlesnakes
- B-side: "Sweetness"
- Released: 2 November 1984
- Studio: The Garden (London)
- Genre: Acoustic rock
- Length: 3:30
- Label: Polydor
- Songwriters: Neil Clark; Lloyd Cole
- Producer: Paul Hardiman

Lloyd Cole and the Commotions singles chronology
"Forest Fire" (1984)	"Rattlesnakes" (1984)	"Brand New Friend" (1985)

Music video
- "Rattlesnakes" on YouTube

"Rattlesnakes" is a song by the British rock and pop band Lloyd Cole and the Commotions, released in 1984 as the third and final single from their debut studio album of the same name. The song was written by Lloyd Cole and produced by Paul Hardiman. It peaked at number 65 in the UK singles chart and remained in the top 100 for three weeks.

== Background ==
"Rattlesnakes" originated with a guitar riff from the band's guitarist Neil Clark. Clark recalled in 2004, "[It's] the only riff and tune that's ever come to me in my sleep. I got up at 3am and recorded it quickly on a portastudio. We played it at practice the next day." When Clark introduced his riff idea, Cole came up with a counter-melody and wrote the song's lyrics. Inspired by the works of American writer Joan Didion, Cole took the main character from Didion's 1977 novel A Book of Common Prayer and "inserted her into the landscape" of her 1970 novel Play It as It Lays.

== Critical reception ==
Upon its release as a single, Cath Carroll of NME commented that Cole "exploits a pre-set formula to the full, but does it with such grace, such artistry, etc, that 'Rattlesnakes' is irresistible". Feargal Sharkey, as guest reviewer for Melody Maker, praised "Rattlesnakes" as "definitely one up for Mr. Cole". He felt the song was an example of a "good record", one which "affect[s] people's emotions" and "makes you feel happy so you just wanna cruise along with it". Morrissey, guest reviewing the singles for Smash Hits, noted, "This is their best yet, but I wish Lloyd would realise that Chapel-en-le-Frith has far more literary worth than Baltimore." (Note: This comment seems to ignore the fact that the song is explicitly set in San Jose, California, and never mentions Baltimore in any context whatsoever.) Frank Edmonds of the Bury Free Press gave the single an 8 out of 10 rating. He described it as "wonderful" and "catchy", and also noted the "lovely driving guitar rhythm".

Andy McCluskey of Orchestral Manoeuvres in the Dark, as guest reviewer for Record Mirror, commented, "Having just listened to Depeche Mode this sounds positively dated, but that's what people want these days. Why is it that old Marlon Brando movies are so bloody trendy these days?" Paul Benbow of the Reading Evening Post commented it is "nice to sing along to" but added it was "perhaps not the strongest track" from Rattlesnakes. Radio Luxembourg DJ Mike Hollis, writing for the Daily Mirror, felt the song was "good" but added, "I'm not sure it's strong enough to compete with all that's going to be around over the next couple of weeks."

== Track listing ==
7–inch single (UK, Europe, Australasia and Japan)

1. "Rattlesnakes" – 3:27
2. "Sweetness" – 2:50

7–inch single (Spain)

1. "Rattlesnakes" – 3:27
2. "Perfect Skin" – 3:10

12-inch single (UK, Europe and Australasia)

1. "Rattlesnakes" – 3:27
2. "Sweetness" – 2:50
3. "Four Flights Up" – 2:39

== Personnel ==
Lloyd Cole and the Commotions

- Lloyd Cole – vocals
- Neil Clark – guitar
- Blair Cowan – keyboards
- Lawrence Donegan – bass
- Stephen Irvine – drums

Production

- Paul Hardiman – producer

Other

- Da Gama – design
- Peter Anderson – photography

== Charts ==
Chart (1984)	Peak position
Australia (Kent Music Report)	59
Netherlands (Dutch Top 40)	31
Netherlands (Single Top 100)	31
Belgium (Ultratop 50 Flanders)	33
UK Singles (OCC)	65
