= Jennifer She Said =

1987 song by Lloyd Cole and the Commotions

Single by Lloyd Cole and the Commotions

from the album Mainstream
- B-side: "Perfect Blue"
- Released: 29 December 1987 (UK)
- Length: 3:03
- Label: Polydor
- Songwriters: Lloyd Cole and the Commotions
- Producer: Ian Stanley

Lloyd Cole and the Commotions singles chronology
"My Bag" (1987)	"Jennifer She Said" (1987)	"From the Hip" (1988)

"Jennifer She Said" is a song by British band Lloyd Cole and the Commotions, released in 1987 as the second single from their third and final studio album Mainstream (1987). The song was written by the band and produced by Ian Stanley. It peaked at number 31 in the UK Singles Chart and remained in the top 75 for five weeks.

== Background ==
Speaking of the song's lyrics, Cole told Smash Hits in 1988,

"It's the story of a gentleman engaged in an embrace with a young lady who notices he has a tattoo that isn't her name. People assume that love will be forever and it very rarely is. It is a little fatalistic, but I absolutely believe the sentiments of it. I don't know how many times I've said 'forever', or at least thought it if I didn't say it out loud. I wrote the song because I wanted to describe that little scenario of her seeing the tattoo that illustrated this recurring truth. But I think people who conclude from that that you can't love somebody because you don't know if it will last are just silly. To be in love for a few years is better than not being in love at all."

== Critical reception ==
Upon its release as a single, Bob Stanley of NME praised "Jennifer She Said" as "a charming vignette to tattoos and marriage" that "yields all those deft lyrical twists which seemed to have deserted Cole after the self-parody of Easy Pieces and the forgettable 'My Bag'". He considered it the band's "best single in yonks" and noted it could have been "one of the finer moments" from the band's 1984 debut album Rattlesnakes. He added, "Most impressive is the way in which the production includes nothing but a small string section for frills. Delightful." Jerry Smith of Music Week described it as a "superb track" and added that, in light of the preceding single's failure to reach the top 40, "If talent like this can't result in hits, then God help us!" Kate Davies of Number One awarded three out of five stars and commented, "One of the best things they've had out for yonks. Lloyd's got the sort of voice that soon gets under your skin once you've got used to its compelling breathiness."

Marcus Hodge of the Cambridge Evening News praised it as the "strongest song" from Mainstream and added, "Lloyd at his best, being both literary and tuneful. Hope it's a hit." In a 2012 feature on the song, Jim Griffin, writing for The Guardian, described it as his favourite Lloyd Cole song and noted the "jangly guitars", "croaked delivery" and lyrics "about the fickle nature of early romance".

== Track listing ==
7–inch single (UK, Europe and Australasia)

1. "Jennifer She Said" – 3:03
2. "Perfect Blue" – 4:13

12–inch single (UK, Europe and Australasia)

1. "Jennifer She Said" – 3:03
2. "Perfect Blue" – 4:13
3. "Mystery Train" (Recorded live at 'The World' USA 1986) – 2:48
4. "I Don't Believe You" (Recorded live at 'The World' USA 1986) – 3:04

CD single (UK and Europe)

1. "Jennifer She Said" – 3:03
2. "Perfect Blue" – 4:13
3. "My Bag" (Dancing Remix) – 6:38

== Personnel ==
Lloyd Cole and the Commotions

- Lloyd Cole – vocals, guitar
- Neil Clark – guitar
- Blair Cowan – keyboards
- Lawrence Donegan – bass
- Stephen Irvine – drums

Additional musicians

- Nicky Holland – string arrangements ("Jennifer She Said")

Production

- Ian Stanley – producer ("Jennifer She Said", "My Bag")
- Femi Jiya – recording ("Jennifer She Said")
- Bruce Lampcov – mixing ("Jennifer She Said")
- Paul Hardiman – producer ("Perfect Blue")
- François Kevorkian – remixer ("My Bag")

Other

- Alastair Thain – photography
- Michael Nash Associates – sleeve

== Charts ==
=== Weekly charts ===
Chart (1988)	Peak position
Ireland (IRMA)	27
Italy Airplay (Music & Media)	3
UK Singles (OCC)	31
