= From the Hip (song) =

1987 song by Lloyd Cole and the Commotions

Song by Lloyd Cole and the Commotions

from the album Mainstream
- Released: 11 April 1988
- Length: 3:57 (album version); 3:53 (single version); 4:37 (extended version)
- Label: Polydor
- Songwriter(s): Lloyd Cole and the Commotions
- Producer(s): Ian Stanley

Lloyd Cole and the Commotions singles chronology
| "Jennifer She Said" (1987) | "From the Hip" (1988) |

Music video
- "From the Hip" on YouTube

"From the Hip" is a song by British band Lloyd Cole and the Commotions, released in 1988 as an extended play from their third and final studio album Mainstream (1987). The song was written by the band and produced by Ian Stanley. It peaked at number 59 in the UK Singles Chart and remained in the top 75 for two weeks.

== Background ==
"From the Hip" was Lloyd Cole and the Commotions' final release before their split in 1989. For its release on the EP, "From the Hip" was remixed by Gavin MacKillop and the band. The EP's three additional tracks, "Please", "Lonely Mile" and "Love Your Wife", were new songs recorded by the band during what would be their final recording sessions in February 1988. By this time, the band were reduced to a four piece as keyboardist Blair Cowan had left in 1987. In 2008, Cole recalled of the band's final sessions, "I guess we were interested in being more of a rock band, yes. We had no keyboard player – that's a start!"

== Critical reception ==
Upon its release as an EP, Tom Doyle of Smash Hits praised the song as "a very clever ditty" and "one of the better tracks on Mainstream", but felt that "it's really more of an LP cut than a hit single". He added, "But since this is a four track EP with three quite good brand new songs included, there'll no doubt be a lot of fans who'll rush out to [buy] it." Jerry Smith of Music Week drew attention to the EP's "three brand new, and rather effective, numbers". Marcus Alton of the Newark Advertiser commented, "It's best to sit in a dark room when listening to this EP. Then you'll match the depressing mood Lloydie must have been in when he wrote three quarters of it". He described "From the Hip" as a "beautifully bitter number", "Please" and "Lonely Mile" as "topping the sad scale" and "Love Your Wife" as the track that "adds hope". He added that the EP represented "good value" for money. Tom Jones, writing for The Ayrshire Post, stated, "Once again Cole demonstrates true style as an artiste. Great vocals, great song, great production."

== Track listing ==
7–inch EP (UK and Europe)

1. "From the Hip" (Remix) – 3:53
2. "Please" – 3:55
3. "Lonely Mile" – 4:00
4. "Love Your Wife" – 3:47

12–inch EP (UK and Europe)

1. "From the Hip" (Extended Remix) – 4:37
2. "Lonely Mile" – 4:00
3. "Love Your Wife" – 3:47
4. "Please" – 3:55

CD EP (UK and Europe)

1. "From the Hip" (Remix) – 3:53
2. "Lonely Mile" – 4:00
3. "Love Your Wife" – 3:47
4. "Please" – 3:55

== Personnel ==
Lloyd Cole and the Commotions

- Lloyd Cole – vocals, guitar
- Neil Clark – guitar
- Blair Cowan – keyboards (on "From the Hip" only)
- Lawrence Donegan – bass
- Stephen Irvine – drums

Production

- Ian Stanley – producer ("From the Hip")
- Gavin MacKillop – remixing ("From the Hip")
- The Commotions – remixing ("From the Hip"), producers ("Please", "Lonely Mile" and "Love Your Wife")
- Kenny MacDonald – producer ("Please", "Lonely Mile" and "Love Your Wife")

Other

- Russell Young – photography
- Michael Nash Associates – sleeve

== Charts ==
| Chart (1988) | Peak position |
|---|---|
| UK Singles (OCC) | 59 |
