= My Bag (Lloyd Cole and the Commotions song) =

1987 song by Lloyd Cole and the Commotions

Single by Lloyd Cole and the Commotions

from the album Mainstream
- B-side: "Jesus Said"
- Released: 21 September 1987 (UK)
- Length: 3:54
- Label: Polydor; Capitol (North America)
- Songwriters: Lloyd Cole and the Commotions
- Producer: Ian Stanley

Lloyd Cole and the Commotions singles chronology
"Rich" (1986)	"My Bag" (1987)	"Jennifer She Said" (1987)

Music video
- "My Bag" on YouTube

"My Bag" is a song by British band Lloyd Cole and the Commotions, released in 1987 as the lead single from their third and final studio album Mainstream (1987). The song was written by the band and produced by Ian Stanley. It peaked at number 46 in the UK Singles Chart and remained in the top 75 for three weeks.

== Background ==
Musically, "My Bag" was written as a group effort by the band and originated from several other song ideas which were never fully developed. Cole's lyrics were largely inspired by the cocaine-addicted narrator of American author Jay McInerney's 1984 novel Bright Lights, Big City. In a 1987 interview with Sounds, he revealed,

"I actually thought that in 'My Bag' I'd recovered some of the reckless, careless writing that I used to do in things like 'Perfect Skin'. I wrote it when I was drunk one night. It's basically about a coked up stockbroker. I took most of the scenarios from Bright Lights, Big City or things that I'd heard like some executive that we've dealt with getting a phone call from another part of the office saying, 'Come upstairs, it's snowing', which of course meant a whole load of new coke was in. I thought 'a multi-story snowstorm' was quite a nice way to start a song."

Bassist Lawrence Donegan told The Journal in 1987, "It's about a cocaine freak. There's no message, it's just an observation type song. The band is definitely anti-drugs and I think the song makes it clear that the guy is an idiot."

== Release ==
The B-side "Jesus Said" was originally recorded as an outtake in 1985 but did not see a release until its inclusion on the "My Bag" single. For the 12-inch formats of the single, a "Dancing Remix" of "My Bag" was made by François Kevorkian. Cole has described it as the "only good" 12-inch remix of all the band's work.

"My Bag" was considered a commercial disappointment after it failed to reach the UK top 40. Cole told Record Mirror in 1987, "We knew that coming back after all this time was going to be difficult, especially with a tricky single, though that had always worked for us in the past. It normally meant that people were more interested. 'My Bag' seemed the right one for us to come back with because we didn't want people to hang this reticent, thoughtful pop group thing on us and 'My Bag' was more upfront than people would normally associate us with."

== Music video ==
The song's music video features some altered lines as the band's record label feared it would either not get played or be banned for its drug references. The video achieved breakout rotation on MTV.

== Critical reception ==
Upon its release as a single, Hue and Cry, as guest reviewers for Smash Hits, picked "My Bag" as the magazine's "single of the fortnight". Pat Kane noted the unexpected appearance of "wah-wah guitars" and "funky clipped chords" on a Lloyd Cole and the Commotions record, and stated, "It's a pop record that strives to be individual within the confines of pop music and doesn't surrender to the clichés just to make money." Andy Rutherford of the Gateshead Post noted that it had a "funkier sound than before" which "add[s] strength" to the band's "usual guitar-driven jangle". Mat Snow of Sounds commented that the song, with its lyrics where the narrator is "in the throes of a king-size nose-candy paranoid psychosis", "hardly suits Cole's made-to-measure cool" and, despite its "dramatic scenario", felt it to be "second-hand The The". Birmingham Daily News described it as "fast pop-rock" but added it is "hard to pick out the tune".

Pan-European magazine Music & Media picked "My Bag" as their "single of the week" and described it as a "driving pop single which still leaves their lyrical base fully intact". They noted the "crisp and accessible production" by Ian Stanley and added that it is "the most commercial single of their career so far". In the US, Bill Coleman of Billboard praised it as a "bopping rock piece" which "could move [these] cult faves into the mainstream". Hard Report believed the song had strong potential on alternative radio and noted the "hook" and "bright dance melody". They added, "Gone are the rather cumbersome and self-conscious lyrics, although lyrical intelligence is still the key, but without weighing the record down."

== Track listing ==
7–inch single (UK, Europe, Japan and Australasia)

1. "My Bag" – 3:54
2. "Jesus Said" – 3:10

7–inch single (US and Canada)

1. "My Bag" – 3:54
2. "Love Your Wife" – 3:59

12–inch single (UK, Europe and Australasia)

1. "My Bag" (Dancing Remix) – 6:22
2. "Perfect Skin" (Commotions Meet the Irresistible Force) – 5:33
3. "Jesus Said" – 3:10

12–inch limited edition single (UK)

1. "My Bag" (Dancing Remix) – 6:38
2. "My Bag" (Dancing Remix Dub) – 5:35
3. "Jesus Said" – 3:10

12–inch single (US and Canada)

1. "My Bag" (Dancing Remix) – 6:37
2. "My Bag" (Dancing Remix Dub) – 5:34
3. "Love Your Wife" – 3:59

== Personnel ==
Lloyd Cole and the Commotions

- Lloyd Cole – vocals, guitar
- Neil Clark – guitar
- Blair Cowan – keyboards
- Lawrence Donegan – bass
- Stephen Irvine – drums

Production

- Ian Stanley – producer ("My Bag")
- Paul Hardiman – producer ("Jesus Said", "Perfect Skin")
- Femi Jiya – recording ("My Bag")
- Bruce Lampcov – mixing ("My Bag")
- Lloyd Cole and the Commotions – producers ("Love Your Wife")
- Kenny MacDonald – producer ("Love Your Wife")
- The Irresistible Force (Mixmaster Morris and Des de Moor) – re-producers ("Perfect Skin")
- Serge Glanzberg – engineer ("Perfect Skin")
- François Kevorkian – remixer ("My Bag" – Dancing Remix/Dancing Remix Dub)

Other

- Alastair Thain – photography
- Michael Nash Associates – sleeve

== Charts ==
=== Weekly charts ===
Chart (1987–1989)	Peak position
Ireland (IRMA)	20
Italy Airplay (Music & Media)	14
UK Singles (Official Charts)	46
US Billboard Hot Dance Music Club Play	48
US Billboard Modern Rock Tracks	13
