= Brand New Friend =

1985 song by Lloyd Cole and the Commotions

Single by Lloyd Cole and the Commotions

from the album Easy Pieces
- B-side: "Her Last Fling"
- Released: 6 September 1985
- Length: 4:51
- Label: Polydor
- Songwriter(s): Lloyd Cole; Blair Cowan
- Producer(s): Clive Langer; Alan Winstanley

Lloyd Cole and the Commotions singles chronology
"Rattlesnakes" (1984)	"Brand New Friend" (1985)	"Lost Weekend" (1985)

Music video
- "Brand New Friend" on YouTube

"Brand New Friend" is a song by British band Lloyd Cole and the Commotions, released in 1985 as the lead single from their second studio album Easy Pieces. The song was written by band members Lloyd Cole and Blair Cowan, and produced by Clive Langer and Alan Winstanley. It peaked at number 19 in the UK Singles Chart and remained in the top 100 for nine weeks.

== Background ==
In a 1985 interview with Sounds, Cole described "Brand New Friend" as being "about a character who's in a fairly pitiful position of being aware that he's not as happy as he once was, but not being sure what to do about it. He's also aware that he's verging on self-pity, which is also quite ridiculous. So it's quite funny too. He's aware it's a little cry for help."

== Critical reception ==
Upon its release as a single, Diane Cross of Record Mirror described "Brand New Friend" as "another slightly uptempo, soulful sound from the man with the sorrowful eyes". She felt it would "probably manage to avoid chart domination, but will more than please his many fans". Frank Edmonds of the Bury Free Press gave the single an 8 out of 10 rating. He noted the "striking vocal married to a lovely tune" and added, "Cole just oozes stylish moodiness and here it spills out all over the record."

Karen Swayne of Number One commented, "Lloyd's mannered vocals are as appealing as ever, though a bit uncomfortable over such a jaunty little tune. There are strings and girl backing vocals thrown in for good measure, but I'd have preferred a simpler sound. Even so, it outclasses most of the week's releases." Sean O'Hagan of NME felt both "Brand New Friend" and its B-side, "Her Last Fling", are "haunted by the ghost of vintage Dylan/Reed/Ferry". He commented, "The opening line bodes well but Lloyd is still content to slip into the guise of his heroes and revisit territory that has already been done to death."

== Track listing ==
7–inch single (UK, Europe, US, Canada and Japan)

1. "Brand New Friend" – 4:46
2. "Her Last Fling" – 2:46

7–inch single (Australasia)

1. "Brand New Friend" – 4:00
2. "Her Last Fling" – 2:46

12–inch single (UK, Europe and Australasia)

1. "Brand New Friend" (Long Version) – 5:34
2. "Her Last Fling" – 2:46
3. "2CV" (Recorded live) – 3:00
4. "Speedboat" (Recorded live) – 4:15

== Personnel ==
Lloyd Cole and the Commotions

- Lloyd Cole – vocals, guitar
- Neil Clark – guitar
- Blair Cowan – keyboards
- Lawrence Donegan – bass
- Stephen Irvine – drums

Additional musicians on "Brand New Friend"

- Jimmy Thomas – backing vocals
- Jimmy Helms – backing vocals
- Lance Ellington – backing vocals
- Anne Dudley – string arrangement

Production

- Clive Langer – producer ("Brand New Friend")
- Alan Winstanley – producer ("Brand New Friend")
- Lloyd Cole and the Commotions – producers ("Her Last Fling", "2CV", "Speedboat")
- Richard Sullivan – engineer ("Brand New Friend", "Her Last Fling")
- Mark Saunders – engineer ("Brand New Friend", "Her Last Fling")
- Kenny MacDonald – engineer ("Brand New Friend", "Her Last Fling")

Other

- Peter Anderson – sleeve
- Clare Cameron – sleeve

== Charts ==
Chart (1985)	Peak position
Australia (Kent Music Report)	73
Europe (European Top 100 Singles)	52
Ireland (IRMA)	11
UK Singles (OCC)	19
