= Music in a Foreign Language =

Studio album by Lloyd Cole
- Released: 9 June 2003
- Recorded: 2002–2003
- Genre: Acoustic folk
- Length: 39:05
- Label: Sanctuary
- Producer: Lloyd Cole

Lloyd Cole chronology
Love Story (1995)	Music in a Foreign Language (2003)	Antidepressant (2006)

Music in a Foreign Language is the sixth solo studio album by English musician Lloyd Cole, released on 9 June 2003 through Sanctuary Records. It includes a cover of Nick Cave's track "People Ain't No Good" from his 1997 album The Boatman's Call, as well as contributions from Dave Derby, who worked with Cole in the band the Negatives, and former Commotions member Neil Clark on guitar.

== Critical reception ==
Professional ratings
Review scores
Source	Rating
AllMusic	4/5 stars

Tim Sendra of AllMusic called the album Cole's "most intimate and low-key yet", with its "acoustic guitars, restrained drums, and subtle instrumentation", writing that it "succeeds in a way that most of his over-produced previous albums fail to do". Sendra also felt that Cole "manages to strip down his sound without falling into the trap that many artists do, that of stripping too much away and becoming boring". Rob Horning of PopMatters opined that Cole had "made the inevitable singer-songwriter move to acoustic folk", finding that the album "has a consolidating, retrenching feel" and its 10 songs are "extremely consistent in melody and mood without being monotonous". Horning went on to call its tracks "hushed, pensive, and more or less percussion-free, with delicately picked guitar quaintly ornamented by steel guitar and gentle string arrangements" and its melodies "familiar and pretty". Dan Tallis, reviewing for the BBC, called it an "unashamedly laid back affair" with "10 simple and beautiful songs".

== Track listing ==
All tracks are written by Lloyd Cole, except where noted

Music in a Foreign Language track listing
No.	Title	Length
1.	"Music in a Foreign Language"	4:28
2.	"My Other Life"	4:08
3.	"Late Night, Early Town"	4:06
4.	"Cutting Out"	3:24
5.	"No More Love Songs"	3:15
6.	"Today I'm Not So Sure"	3:13
7.	"My Alibi"	3:15
8.	"People Ain't No Good" (written by Nick Cave)	5:03
9.	"Brazil" (written by Cole, Dave Derby and Jill Sobule)	2:58
10.	"Shelf Life"	5:15
Total length:		39:05

== Personnel ==
Musicians

- Lloyd Cole – vocals, guitar, piano, programming
- Lullaby Baxter – vocals (1, 3, 5, 8, 9)
- Neil Clark – electric guitar (1, 4, 9, 10)
- Dave Derby – steel guitar (3, 5, 7), voice (9)
- Ray Mason – bass guitar (5, 7, 9, 10)
- Virginia Soledade – voice (9)

Production

- Lloyd Cole – producer
- Mick Glossop – mixing
- Bunt Stafford Clark – mastering

Other

- Blaise Reutersward – photography
- Hosuk Lee-Makiyama – art direction

== Charts ==
Chart performance for Music in a Foreign Language
Chart (2003)	Peak position
UK Albums (OCC)	114
UK Independent Albums (OCC)	18
