= Standards (Lloyd Cole album) =

Studio album by Lloyd Cole
- Released: 21 June 2013
- Recorded: November 2012 – February 2013
- Genre: Alternative rock
- Length: 39:22
- Label: Tapete
- Producer: Lloyd Cole

Lloyd Cole chronology
| Broken Record (2010) | Standards (2013) | Guesswork (2019) |

Singles from Standards
- 1. "Period Piece" Released: 31 May 2013

Standards is a rock album by English singer, songwriter and musician Lloyd Cole released on 21 June 2013 by Tapete Records. It is Cole's tenth solo album under his own name, although only his second since 1995 to feature a full band of additional musicians.

Cole produced the album himself with additional mixing by Olaf Opal and Joerg Siegeler.

== Background ==
Cole says that he was inspired by the energy and vibrancy of Bob Dylan's album Tempest, which surprised him considering Dylan's age. Cole said:

I am conscious of having been maybe overly concerned with being dignified in my old age [...] I just thought to myself, 'what would happen if I just kind of let loose and not worry about whether it is appropriate to be making this music or not? And just basically follow my guts?'

The album is also notable for its emphasis on electric guitar; Cole had established himself as an acoustic and folk musician through his most recent studio releases and touring predominantly as solo performer with an acoustic guitar.

When I was conceiving these songs from the ideas in my notebooks, I realised that at least half of them were rock’n’roll, something I thought belonged to my past. But I believe you should allow the songs to be boss, and the songs were saying, You need to make a rock record – or at least a pop record with a rock’n’roll band.

The band assembled by Cole includes, among others, the rhythm section from his debut self-titled solo album (1990) and his follow up Don't Get Weird on Me Babe (1991) in the form of drummer Fred Maher and bassist Matthew Sweet. Blair Cowan a former member of the Commotions plays keyboards and Joan Wasser plays piano and supplies additional vocals. Cole's own son William plays guitar on the album including a solo on the track 'It's Late'. William also appeared in the video for the song 'Period Piece'.

Cole wrote 10 original songs for the album alone before taking them to the studio to play with the other musicians, he only had the guitar parts to play as he had not recorded demo tracks prior to entering the studio. The album features a cover of a John Hartford song called "California Earthquake," which Cole mistakenly believed to have been a composition by John Phillips of The Mamas & the Papas after hearing a version sung by Cass Elliot.

The album was recorded in Los Angeles, Easthampton and New York and mixed in Bochum.

== Financing ==
The recording of the album was partially financed through pre-sales of a deluxe limited edition of the album; the purchasers were also credited as executive producers of the album and received copies before general release. The deluxe limited edition of the album was a pre-sale exclusive and featured an additional disc of outtakes, a handwritten lyric book, and a personal note of thanks from Cole, as well as the complete album. A target of 600 box sales was successfully reached before the scheduled deadline. The rest of the recording budget was provided by Tapete Records and Cole himself.

== Critical reception ==
Professional ratings
Aggregate scores
| Source | Rating |
|---|---|
| Metacritic | 83/100 |
Review scores
| Source | Rating |
| AllMusic | 4/5 stars |
| American Songwriter | 4/5 stars |
| Mojo | 4/5 stars |
| Mirror | 4/5 stars |
| Popmatters | 9/10 stars |
| Q | 4/5 stars |
| Uncut | 4/5 stars |

The album has been well received by critics and reviewers. The Independent described it as 'what may be [Cole's] best album... he's devised a sound replete with twisting, cyclical guitar lines and tints of keyboards.' The Sunday Times wrote that 'Lloyd Cole's latest album is fine advertisement for approaching the act of writing in contemplative way. Record Collector said of the album: 'glittering literate... with its steely interlaced guitars and high/low cultural references is like Television and Lou Reed on a road trip in a top-down convertible, with a stack of jazz mags in the boot. The magazine Mojo described the album as 'captivating' saying the tracks 'form a charming, intriguing whole, sometimes with telling simplicity.'

Reviews have also compared the album both positively and negatively to his work with the Commotions. The Arts Desk described it as 'an album that ticks a lot of the old boxes, with some lovely dad-rock flourishes. While Roy Wilkinson writing in Mojo said the album harks back to the Commotions' second album Easy Pieces, dubbing it archetypal Cole. In contrast, The Telegraph said 'Each song is carefully crafted, filled with a kind of mordant, misanthropic wit that skates over deep emotions' and that Cole fails to 'recapture the firebrand innocence of his early pop classics.'

== Track listing ==
All tracks are written by Lloyd Cole except where noted.

| No. | Title | Writer(s) | Length |
|---|---|---|---|
| 1. | "California Earthquake" | John Hartford | 3:49 |
| 2. | "Women's Studies" | | 4:12 |
| 3. | "Period Piece" | | 3:27 |
| 4. | "Myrtle and Rose" | | 5:19 |
| 5. | "No Truck" | | 2:52 |
| 6. | "Blue Like Mars" | | 4:19 |
| 7. | "Opposites Day" | | 4:16 |
| 8. | "Silver Lake" | | 2:41 |
| 9. | "It's Late" | | 3:12 |
| 10. | "Kids Today" | | 2:56 |
| 11. | "Diminished Ex" | | 4:18 |

== Personnel ==
Musicians

- Lloyd Cole – guitar, keyboards, vocals, production
- Matthew Sweet – bass guitar, backing vocals
- Fred Maher – drums
- Blair Cowan – keyboards
- Mark Schwaber – guitar, harmony vocals
- Will Cole – guitar, harmony vocals
- Matt Cullen – guitar
- Joan Wasser – piano, harmony vocals
- Dave Derby – harmony vocals
- Mike Wyzik – percussion

Technical personnel

- Olaf Opal – mixing
- Joerg Siegeler – mixing
- Hosuk Lee-Makiyama – artwork design

== Charts ==
Chart performance for Standards
| Chart (2013) | Peak position |
|---|---|
| German Albums (Offizielle Top 100) | 98 |
| Swedish Albums (Sverigetopplistan) | 22 |
| UK Albums (OCC) | 74 |
| Scottish Albums (OCC) | 72 |
| UK Independent Albums (OCC) | 17 |
