= Forest Fire (song) =

1984 song by Lloyd Cole and the Commotions

Single by Lloyd Cole and the Commotions

from the album Rattlesnakes
- B-side: "Andy's Babies"
- Released: 17 August 1984
- Studio: The Garden (London)
- Genre: Soul
- Length: 4:33
- Label: Polydor
- Songwriter: Lloyd Cole
- Producer: Paul Hardiman

Lloyd Cole and the Commotions singles chronology
"Perfect Skin" (1984)	"Forest Fire" (1984)	"Rattlesnakes" (1984)

Music video
- "Forest Fire" on YouTube

"Forest Fire" is a song by the British band Lloyd Cole and the Commotions, released in 1984 as the second single from their debut studio album, Rattlesnakes. The song was written by Lloyd Cole and produced by Paul Hardiman. It peaked at number 41 in the UK singles chart and remained in the top 75 for six weeks.

== Writing ==
Cole first thought of the title at the age of 16 and made note of it for a future song. He told Record Mirror in 1984, "I thought the [title] was very evocative, though the idea of fire being synonymous with passion is nothing new." Cole then wrote and demoed the song during a weekend in 1983, in his room at Glasgow Golf Club, where his parents worked and lived. He demoed the track using a Portastudio, a DX7 and a drum machine, all of which the band had recently purchased after securing a publishing deal. The band signed to Polydor Records shortly after.

Cole has described "Forest Fire" as "a straight love song" and told Record Mirror in 1984, "It's about as straight as I can get. I still can't resist telling jokes in the song at the same time as I'm being relatively serious." He added to Melody Maker, "It's very difficult for me to do things straight. 'Forest Fire' is obviously just a simple metaphor, so that's my little joke, but the song is actually quite serious and I don't write many serious songs."

== Recording ==
Guitarist Neil Clark recorded the guitar solo in the studio one night. He told The Guardian in 2019, "I came up with this epic solo, and Paul and I stayed up all night recording it. At 2am, with everything turned up, it sounded incredible, but the next day I thought we'd gone over the top and wanted to take some of it off. Paul said, 'No, play it to everyone as it is' and everyone agreed it was incredible, so we left it."

== Critical reception ==
Upon its release as a single, Adrian Thrills of NME picked "Forest Fire" as the magazine's "single of the week" and described it as a "brooding piece of emotional melodrama". He wrote, "Against an organ motif that could have been lifted from Roxy Music's 'Psalm', this mini-epic swells and groans as the countrified funk guitar metamorphoses into giant slabs of metallic chaos by the closing bars." He added that Cole's lyrics "positively bristles with the depth and feeling of a lover ready to be heartbroken". Dylan Jones of Record Mirror noted the "original, soulful and mindbending lyrics topping off a humdinger of a tune". Robert Hodgens of The Bluebells, as guest reviewer for Smash Hits, considered it "an excellent record" on which "the mood prevails". He felt the highlight was the "great guitar break at the end".

Jerry Smith of Music Week praised it as a "slow, moody song" which starts with just his deep resonant vocal and builds with some atmospheric backing into a languid, echoing guitar solo". He added that it "looks certain to give him another hit". Frank Hopkinson of Number One considered "Forest Fire" to be "less poppy" than its predecessor, "Perfect Skin", but "still '60s orientated". Jim Whiteford of The Kilmarnock Standard described it as an "emotive down-tempo pop ballad with dragging vocal embalmed in organ". He added that it is "pretty well written" and "repetitive enough to become a small hit".

== Track listing ==
7–inch single (UK, Europe and Australasia)

1. "Forest Fire" – 4:33
2. "Andy's Babies" – 2:50

7–inch gatefold single (with free single) (UK)

1. "Forest Fire" – 4:33
2. "Andy's Babies" – 2:50
3. "Perfect Skin" (Demo Version) – 3:20

12-inch single (UK, Europe and Australasia)

1. "Forest Fire" (Extended Version) – 5:12
2. "Andy's Babies" – 2:50
3. "Glory" – 2:39

== Personnel ==
Lloyd Cole and the Commotions

- Lloyd Cole – vocals
- Neil Clark – guitar
- Blair Cowan – keyboards
- Lawrence Donegan – bass
- Stephen Irvine – drums

Production

- Paul Hardiman – producer ("Forest Fire", "Andy's Babies", "Glory")

Other

- Da Gama – design
- Nick Knight – photography

== Charts ==
Chart (1984)	Peak position
Australia (Kent Music Report)	87
Europe (European Top 100 Singles)	82
Netherlands (Tipparade)	17
New Zealand (Recorded Music NZ)	25
UK Singles (Official Charts)	41
