= Lost Weekend (song) =

1985 song by Lloyd Cole and the Commotions

Single by Lloyd Cole and the Commotions

from the album Easy Pieces
- B-side: "Big World"
- Released: 1 November 1985
- Studio: Westside Studios (Shepherd's Bush, London)
- Length: 3:14
- Label: Polydor
- Songwriters: Neil Clark; Lloyd Cole; Lawrence Donegan
- Producers: Clive Langer; Alan Winstanley

Lloyd Cole and the Commotions singles chronology
"Brand New Friend" (1985)	"Lost Weekend" (1985)	"Cut Me Down" (1986)

Music video
- "Lost Weekend" on YouTube

"Lost Weekend" is a song by the British rock and pop band Lloyd Cole and the Commotions, released on 1 November 1985 by Polydor Records as the second single from their second studio album, Easy Pieces (1985). The song was written by band members Neil Clark, Lloyd Cole and Lawrence Donegan, and produced by Clive Langer and Alan Winstanley. It peaked at number 17 in the UK singles chart and remained in the top 75 for seven weeks. It also hit number 10 in Ireland. It is the highest-ever charting song of Cole's, whether with Commotions or as a solo act.

== Background ==
Cole was inspired to write the lyrics to "Lost Weekend" after he fell ill during a visit to Amsterdam in the Netherlands. He told The Mouth Magazine in 2020, "As I remember it, I was going over to sort of rendezvous there with my girlfriend of the time. I got ill, properly ill and was confined to hotel quarters."

Speaking of the influence that Iggy Pop's 1977 song "The Passenger" had on "Lost Weekend", Cole recalled in 2010, "It just went that way in rehearsal and while we were aware that the rhythm part was the same, the chords and everything else was different, so we weren't bothered. Gosh, I wish it owed more – 'The Passenger' is a fantastic track, 'Lost Weekend', to my ear, is a decent tune done overly quirkily."

== Critical reception ==
Upon its release as a single, Tom Hibbert of Smash Hits commented, "This is lovely – chiming guitars sturdily jaunting and winking at an idea based on Iggy Pop's 'The Passenger' with customary jumbly vocal delivery". He added, "It all sounds uncharacteristically merry until one starts to pick up the words which appear to be about contracting pneumonia in Amsterdam, almost dying and then undergoing a religious conversion." Mat Snow of NME described it as "an agreeable piece of fluff worth at least five plays, if only to spot the 'influence', in this case Iggy's 'The Passenger'".

Malcolm Dome of Kerrang! called it "catchy, sub-Buddy Holly pop/rock" which is "by no means awesome yet certainly invigorating". Dave Ling of Number One felt the song is "forgettably pleasant in a whimsical sort of way" and noted that "a fair amount of thought has been put into the lyrics", but added "it's not the sort of record I'd want to be subjected to more than once". Mike Mitchell of Record Mirror was critical, stating there's "too much jingle [and] not enough song".

== Track listing ==
7–inch single (UK, Europe and Australasia)

1. "Lost Weekend" – 3:14
2. "Big World" – 2:18

10-inch limited edition single (UK)

1. "Lost Weekend" (Extended Version) – 4:19
2. "Big World" – 2:18
3. "Lost Weekend" (7" Version) – 3:14

12-inch single (UK, Europe and Australasia)

1. "Lost Weekend" (Extended Version) – 4:19
2. "Big World" – 2:18
3. "Nevers End" – 2:32
4. "Lost Weekend" (7" Version) – 3:14

== Personnel ==
Lloyd Cole and the Commotions

- Lloyd Cole – vocals, guitar
- Neil Clark – guitar
- Blair Cowan – keyboards
- Lawrence Donegan – bass
- Stephen Irvine – drums

Additional musicians on "Lost Weekend"

- Jimmy Thomas – backing vocals
- Jimmy Chamberland – backing vocals
- Tony Jackson – backing vocals
- Gary Barnacle – brass
- Anne Dudley – string arrangement

Production

- Clive Langer – producer ("Lost Weekend")
- Alan Winstanley – producer ("Lost Weekend")
- Mark Saunders – producer ("Big World", "Nevers End")
- The Commotions – producers ("Big World", "Nevers End")

Other

- Peter Anderson – sleeve
- Clare Cameron – sleeve
- Green Ink – creative assistance

== Charts ==
Chart (1985)	Peak position
Australia (Kent Music Report)	49
Belgium (Ultratop 50 Flanders)	38
Europe (European Hot 100 Singles)	57
Ireland (IRMA)	10
New Zealand (Recorded Music NZ)	33
UK Singles (Official Charts)	17
