= Easy Pieces =

Studio album by Lloyd Cole and the Commotions
- Released: 22 November 1985
- Studio: Westside Studios (Shepherd's Bush, London)
- Genre: Indie pop
- Length: 39:36
- Label: Polydor (UK and Europe); Geffen (US and Canada)
- Producer: Clive Langer; Alan Winstanley

Lloyd Cole and the Commotions chronology
| Rattlesnakes (1984) | Easy Pieces (1985) | Mainstream (1987) |

Singles from Easy Pieces
- 1. "Brand New Friend" Released: 2 September 1985; 2. "Lost Weekend" Released: 1 November 1985; 3. "Cut Me Down" Released: 6 January 1986

Easy Pieces is the second studio album by the British rock and pop band Lloyd Cole and the Commotions. It was released on Polydor Records in the UK on 22 November 1985 and included the UK top 40 singles "Brand New Friend" (#19), "Lost Weekend" (#17) and "Cut Me Down" (#38). The title of the album derives from the American road drama film Five Easy Pieces (1970), which Cole described as "one of my very favourite films", saying, "I want to write at least five songs out of that film".

Following the praise and healthy sales of their debut studio album Rattlesnakes the previous year, Easy Pieces became the band's fastest-selling album, selling more in its first two weeks than Rattlesnakes had managed in a whole year. It was also their highest charting album in the UK, peaking at number 5. The album produced three UK top 40 singles. However, despite Easy Pieces' commercial success, the reception from critics was indifferent and the band themselves were not satisfied with the end result. Cole would later say, "It strikes me that there's something really fresh on the first album which has been dragged onto the second album, and the freshness is not there and something to replace the freshness is not there either". Bassist Lawrence Donegan was more succinct, describing the album as "terrible".

== Composition and recording ==
The band intended Easy Pieces to be more accessible than Rattlesnakes, with Cole saying, "We wanted the sound to be warmer, more luscious". He described the lead single "Brand New Friend" as being "about a character who's in a fairly pitiful position of being aware that he's not as happy as he once was, but not being sure what to do about it. He's also aware that he's verging on self-pity, which is also quite ridiculous. So it's quite funny too. He's aware it's a little cry for help." Cole would later disown some of his writing on the album, stating in 1990, "There are two terrible songs on Easy Pieces, one called "Grace" and another called "Minor Character" which is literally the worst lyric ever written. I really believed I was the Raymond Carver of song when I wrote that. It's truly appalling."

Following promotion for Rattlesnakes, the band went back into the studio with Paul Hardiman again to record the follow-up. However, the relaxed atmosphere that had surrounded the recording of the first record was not replicated. Polydor had left the group alone while recording Rattlesnakes, but now that the band were well known and commercially successful, they took a more active interest and soon dismissed Hardiman, after the initial recording sessions did not immediately prove fruitful. Experienced producers Clive Langer and Alan Winstanley, who up until that point had worked with Madness, the Teardrop Explodes, Dexys Midnight Runners, and Elvis Costello and the Attractions, were drafted in to replace him. Unlike Hardiman, who had taken a hands-off approach, Langer and Winstanley made more suggestions during the recording process, which the Commotions did not always agree with. Langer asked Cole to control the vibrato in his voice, which Cole had no idea how to do as it was his natural way of singing, and as a result he became self-conscious about his singing. Reflecting in 2004 on the process of recording Easy Pieces, Cole felt they had been pushed into making a second record too quickly: "We didn't give ourselves time to step back and think. The record company was telling us 'this is your moment and you must take it now' – which is crap. People would have waited for us. We were insecure so we made the record too soon and the record company fired Paul Hardiman."

== Critical reception ==
Professional ratings
Review scores
| Source | Rating |
|---|---|
| AllMusic | 3/5 stars |
| Mojo | 3/5 stars |
| Record Mirror | 5/5 stars |
| Sounds | 3/5 stars |

Unlike the widespread praise for Rattlesnakes, the reception for Easy Pieces was noticeably inferior. Melody Maker felt that "these songs and their performances sound second-hand. The music is mushy and lacks edges, keyboards brought forward to dilute the guitars. Cole's lyrics sound as though they were written to fit the metre rather than to say anything." NME gave the album little praise, saying "taken on its own terms, it's that most simultaneously fine and useless of creations, a very good pop record". Sounds observed that "the solid production swells to leave no white space. That, though, is the downfall. So solid is this backing, and so relatively unvaried, every verse filled with Cole tones alone, that each tune becomes part of a suety whole. Individually many of the tracks are opalescent, but the overriding feel becomes one of a long (too long) excursion into [...] American country pop."

In the US, Spin was more enthusiastic, stating, "The promise reflected on their impressive debut album Rattlesnakes has been kept... [Cole] and the Commotions write clean, crisp, guitar-oriented pop songs with addictive hook lines."

== Track listing ==
All lyrics written by Lloyd Cole, all songs composed by Cole except where noted.

1. "Rich" – 4:23
2. "Why I Love Country Music" (Cole, Blair Cowan) – 3:00
3. "Pretty Gone" (Neil Clark, Cole) – 3:32
4. "Grace" – 4:05
5. "Cut Me Down" – 4:29
6. "Brand New Friend" (Cole, Cowan) – 4:52
7. "Lost Weekend" (Clark, Cole, Lawrence Donegan) – 3:14
8. "James" – 3:53
9. "Minor Character" (Clark, Cole) – 3:46
10. "Perfect Blue" – 4:30
11. "Her Last Fling" (B-side of "Brand New Friend") – 2:47 (bonus track on cassette and CD)
12. "Big World" (B-side of "Lost Weekend") – 2:17 (bonus track on cassette and CD)
13. "Nevers End" (Clark, Cole) (B-side of 12" of "Lost Weekend") – 2:33 (bonus track on CD only)

== Personnel ==
Lloyd Cole and the Commotions

- Neil Clark – guitar
- Lloyd Cole – vocals, guitar
- Blair Cowan – keyboards
- Lawrence Donegan – bass guitar, guitar
- Stephen Irvine – drums, tambourine

Additional personnel

- Jimmy Thomas, Jimmy Helms, Lance Ellington, Jimmy Chambers, Tony Jackson, Lynda Hayes – additional vocals
- Anne Dudley – string arrangements
- Gary Barnacle – brass arrangements
- "Her Last Fling" produced by Lloyd Cole and the Commotions
- "Big World" and "Nevers End" produced by Mark Saunders and the Commotions

== Charts ==
=== Weekly charts ===
1985–86 weekly chart performance for Easy Pieces
| Chart (1985–86) | Peak position |
|---|---|
| Australian Albums (Kent Music Report) | 14 |
| Dutch Albums (Album Top 100) | 37 |
| European Albums (Eurotipsheet) | 39 |
| New Zealand Albums (RMNZ) | 6 |
| Swedish Albums (Sverigetopplistan) | 25 |
| UK Albums (OCC) | 5 |

=== Year-end charts ===
1986 year-end performance for Easy Pieces
| Chart (1986) | Position |
|---|---|
| New Zealand Albums (RMNZ) | 49 |

== Certifications ==
| Region | Certification | Certified units/sales |
|---|---|---|
| United Kingdom (BPI) | Gold | 100,000^{^} |
^{^} Shipments figures based on certification alone.

== Release history ==
| Region | Date | Label | Format | Catalog |
|---|---|---|---|---|
| United Kingdom | 18 November 1985 | Polydor | LP | LCLP 2 |
| United Kingdom | 18 November 1985 | Polydor | Cassette | LCMC 2 |
| Europe | 18 November 1985 | Polydor | LP | 827 670-1 |
| Europe | 18 November 1985 | Polydor | Cassette | 827 670-4 |
| United Kingdom & Europe | 18 November 1985 | Polydor | CD | 827 670-2 |
| United States | 1985 | Geffen | LP | GHS 24093 |
| Canada | 1985 | Geffen | LP | XGHS 24093 |
| United States | 25 October 1990 | Capitol | CD | CDP 7 91183 2 |
