= Broken Record (album) =

Studio album by Lloyd Cole
- Released: 10 September 2010
- Recorded: March–May 2010
- Genre: Pop; acoustic rock
- Length: 34:56
- Label: Tapete
- Producer: Dave Derby; Lloyd Cole

Lloyd Cole chronology
Antidepressant (2006)	Broken Record (2010)	Standards (2013)

Broken Record is the eighth solo studio album by English musician Lloyd Cole, released on 10 September 2010 through Tapete Records. The album was partly financed by Cole's fans, and includes collaborations with Cole's former Commotions bandmate, keyboardist Blair Cowan, as well as Fred Maher, who co-produced Cole's self-titled album in 1990.

== Critical reception ==
Professional ratings
Review scores
Source	Rating
AllMusic	3.5/5 stars
Record Collector	3/5 stars

Thom Jurek of AllMusic found Broken Record to be "small in scope, but full of crafty hooks, wry, self deprecating humor, and genuine irony. Cole's lyric panache is enhanced by this solid meld of classic singer/songwriter-ish pop, country-tinged acoustic rock, and crystalline production". Jurek concluded that it is the "most consistent upbeat record Cole's released in a dog's age". The Line of Best Fit described the album as a "fine collection" as well as "a concerted attempt to reconnect with his audience. It is accessible and melodic, relatively brief at a little over 35 minutes, feeling country with pedal steel without committing itself fully to Nashville". Reviewing the album for Record Collector, Terry Staunton called it "a busier and more beefed-up collection than 2006's Antidepressant, yet sacrifices none of the introspective intimacy at which the singer excels". He also felt the record is "delivered with the poetic grace and subtle humour we've come to expect, but with a refreshed focus that comes from having collaborators off whom to bounce ideas".

== Track listing ==
All tracks are written by Lloyd Cole.

Broken Record track listing
No.	Title	Length
1.	"Like a Broken Record"	3:18
2.	"Writers Retreat!"	3:03
3.	"The Flipside"	4:02
4.	"Why in the World?"	2:52
5.	"Westchester County Jail"	2:22
6.	"If I Were a Song"	3:47
7.	"That's Alright"	3:56
8.	"Oh Genevieve"	3:35
9.	"Man Overboard"	2:44
10.	"Rhinestones"	2:15
11.	"Double Happiness"	3:02
Total length:		34:56

== Charts ==
Chart performance for Broken Record
Chart (2010)	Peak position
German Albums (Offizielle Top 100)	58
New Zealand Albums (RMNZ)	11
Swedish Albums (Sverigetopplistan)	12
UK Albums (OCC)	150
UK Independent Albums (OCC)	21
