= Rattlesnakes (album) =

Studio album by Lloyd Cole and the Commotions
- Released: 12 October 1984
- Recorded: 1984
- Studio: The Garden (London)
- Genres: Jangle pop; college rock; folk rock; pub rock
- Length: 35:29
- Labels: Polydor (UK and Europe); Geffen (US and Canada)
- Producer: Paul Hardiman

Lloyd Cole and the Commotions chronology
Rattlesnakes (1984)	Easy Pieces (1985)

Singles from Rattlesnakes
- 1. "Perfect Skin" Released: 11 May 1984; 2. "Forest Fire" Released: 17 August 1984; 3. "Rattlesnakes" Released: 2 November 1984

Rattlesnakes is the debut studio album by the British rock and pop band Lloyd Cole and the Commotions, released on 12 October 1984 by Polydor Records. The album reached number 13 on the UK Albums Chart and included the singles "Perfect Skin" (number 26 in UK), "Forest Fire" (number 41 in UK, number 25 in New Zealand) and "Rattlesnakes" (number 65 in UK, number 31 in the Netherlands).

== Composition and recording ==
"If I hadn't listened to 'Subterranean Homesick Blues' I could never have written 'Perfect Skin'. I was totally drunk on [Bob] Dylan at the time I wrote that song and all the imagery is deliberately Dylanesque. I thought, 'why not be blatant?' The only difference is, Dylan would have written a song like 'Perfect Skin' in an hour. It took me a week!"

— Lloyd Cole on his debut single, August 1984

The bulk of the album was written by frontman Lloyd Cole, who formed the band while a student at the University of Glasgow. Cole cited Bob Dylan and Booker T. & the M.G.'s as major influences, but also noted the impact of his studies in English and philosophy on both the album's title, a reference to the novel Play It as It Lays (1970) by Joan Didion, and its lyrics, which also reference Renata Adler, Simone de Beauvoir and Norman Mailer.

The album's songs were written at Glasgow Golf Club, where Cole's father worked as club master and where the family lived. Cole recalled, "'Perfect Skin' and 'Forest Fire' were written one weekend in the basement, underneath the golf club where we used to live and my parents used to work. We'd got our publishing deal so we bought a Portastudio, a [Yamaha] DX7 and a drum machine. I demo-ed both of them that weekend and we had a record deal within a month of that; it was that quick. Every single song on Rattlesnakes was written within a year of the record coming out."

Cole described the songs on Rattlesnakes as "about the things people do when they are in love. People get in all sorts of weird scenarios and I quite like the idea of that. I write about that more than anything. Sometimes it is comic, sometimes tragic, sometimes funny and tragic at the same time. After years of trying to deny it, I'm also starting to realise that I basically write about myself." He later reflected, "It's like most of [the characters in the songs] live in that same basement flat. It's very romanticised." After the Commotions broke up, he later stated to being embarrassed by some of his lyrics on Rattlesnakes: "'She looks like Eve Marie Saint [sic]/In On the Waterfront'. Yes, some of the earlier lyrics were very naive. But I was a young man! I really was. You can just imagine me trying to wear a French trenchcoat at the time, thinking I looked very cool when, in fact, I looked really stupid. But maybe that's why people liked it."

The track "Speedboat" was inspired by the 1976 novel of the same name by Renata Adler. In the book the narrator is startled when a rat runs across the table in the restaurant where she and her partner are dining, and her partner says, "You were all right there until you lost your cool": Cole said that he stole the line and included it in the song because he loved the phrase. Cole stated that "Down on Mission Street" is "about a character who says he'll never look back and will step all over other people". The character in "Charlotte Street" is "based very closely on me. My idea of romance obviously is meeting a wonderful, beautiful girl in the library. I wrote that song and it took me a year to realise that I hadn't actually mentioned that it was set in a library. I forgot to put that in, which is a bit stupid really." Of the album's closing track "Are You Ready to be Heartbroken?", he said, "It's about being so in love there's only one way to go – if you get so happy then you're ready to be heartbroken".

The album was recorded during the British summer of 1984 at The Garden studios in Shoreditch in east London (built and owned by original Ultravox frontman John Foxx), with Paul Hardiman producing. All the band members remembered the recording of Rattlesnakes as a very easy and relaxed process: bassist Lawrence Donegan later said, "Every day we'd arrive at the studio, lay down a few backing tracks, nip along to Brick Lane for a curry and some pints, then head back and record some more. The album was finished in a month. Happy days indeed." Guitarist Neil Clark added, "It was great... Paul Hardiman was great to work with and the weather was great. We just went in and did our stuff. It was like the best job ever at the time. We'd start at 10 am and finish at 6 pm, though I did the 'Forest Fire' solo late one night but that was an exception. We were well organised and we'd played the songs in."

The album cover is a picture by photographer Robert Farber which was chosen by design company Da Gama from a selection of stock photographs.

== Critical reception ==
Professional ratings
Review scores
Source	Rating
AllMusic	4.5/5 stars
Mojo	4/5 stars
Number One	5/5
Q	3/5 stars
Record Mirror	4.5/5 stars
Rolling Stone	3/5 stars
The Rolling Stone Album Guide	4/5 stars
Sounds	4.5/5 stars
Uncut	4/5 stars
The Village Voice	B+

The reception for the UK music magazines at the time of the album's release was generally very positive. Sounds stated, "Rattlesnakes is a wonderful LP, the most refreshing, uncontrived gorgeous lump of gold to be mined from Scotland in ages, pursuing the alternately vibrant and tender pop courses discovered by 'Perfect Skin' and the classic 'Forest Fire'. And it still finds time for excursions into Dylanesque string-embellished balladry, age-old blues licks or eloquent country melody, all led on by the infinitely capable guitar of Neil Clarke (sic)." Record Mirror felt that they could "forgive Lloyd Cole his pretentions towards poetry; his band and he have made one of the best debut albums for a long time". NME ranked it number 21 among the "Albums of the Year" for 1984 and said, "Is there anyone who doesn't like Cole and his cronies, who have made the Velvets do a part C&W album and part deep-south blues-funk – gentle, self-mocking, inoffensive and superbly balanced. Every song is instantly memorable."

Melody Maker was somewhat more critical, believing that "like Orange Juice's Texas Fever and ABC's The Lexicon of Love, Rattlesnakes is an album of cynicism masquerading as romance. It's about past pop's legacy to the present, rather than love or hate or any of the emotions it feigns. It's about how modes of expression haven't moved on one iota from early Bob Dylan, how a generation bereft of its own voice falls back on playing with the language of its peers." However, the review went on to state that the album had much to commend it and admitted that it "had been too hard here on purpose because this record's good enough to stand it. Compared to most else around, it's a gem but Rattlesnakes cried out to shed some of that perfect skin. Then, maybe, we'd believe as well as admire."

In the US the reviews were also favourable. Spin claimed that "Lloyd Cole and the Commotions are the most interesting new band since Jonathan Richman and the Modern Lovers, and Rattlesnakes is a brilliant first album... This is the first album I've heard of late that rejects the techno-pop banality we've been drowning in without being overly self-conscious in its minimalism or wearing a chip on its shoulder." Rolling Stone felt "too much of Rattlesnakes [...] sounds like Lou Reed, Tom Verlaine and Bob Dylan doing the best of Lloyd Cole... But if Rattlesnakes arrives critically short of the greatness claimed for it in the British rock press, its promise is not so easily dismissed... A few more songs like ['Perfect Skin'] and the man really could start a commotion."

Reviewing the 2004 reissue, Mojo hailed Rattlesnakes as "a timeless pop album". Q was less enthusiastic, observing that "the results were, and remain, equal parts irritating and beguiling". Calling the record "one of the finest debuts of the '80s", AllMusic stated that "Rattlesnakes is a college rock masterpiece of smart, ironic lyrics and sympathetic folk-rock-based melodies".

== Track listing ==
All lyrics by Lloyd Cole, all music composed by Cole except where noted.

Side one

1. "Perfect Skin" – 3:13
2. "Speedboat" – 4:37
3. "Rattlesnakes" (Cole, Neil Clark) – 3:28
4. "Down on Mission Street" – 3:49
5. "Forest Fire" – 4:34

Side two

6. "Charlotte Street" – 3:55
7. "2cv" – 2:52
8. "Four Flights Up" (Cole, Lawrence Donegan) – 2:37
9. "Patience" (Cole, Blair Cowan) – 3:40
10. "Are You Ready to Be Heartbroken?" (Cole, Clark) – 3:06

On the North American version of the album, released on Geffen Records, the tracks "Perfect Skin", "Four Flights Up" and "Patience" were remixed by Ric Ocasek of new wave band the Cars.

=== 1985 CD bonus tracks ===
The album was first released on CD in April 1985, six months after the LP/cassette. The CD included four additional songs, all of which had been B-sides to the singles.

11. "Sweetness" (B-side of "Rattlesnakes") – 2:48
12. "Andy's Babies" (Cole, Donegan) (B-side of "Forest Fire") – 2:50
13. "The Sea and the Sand" (B-side of "Perfect Skin" 7" and 12") – 3:02
14. "You Will Never Be No Good" (Cole, Cowan) (B-side of "Perfect Skin" 12") – 2:41

The CD also included the extended version of "Forest Fire", which had appeared on the 12" version of the single. At 5:11 it is almost 40 seconds longer than both the 7" single and original album versions. The Deluxe Edition released in 2004 reverted to the shorter version.

=== 2004 Deluxe Edition ===
In 2004, the band reformed for a brief reunion tour of the UK and Ireland to commemorate the album's 20th anniversary. At the same time, a 2-CD deluxe edition of the album was released on Universal International and Capitol Records in North America. It comprised the ten original album tracks on the first disc, and the four tracks from the CD version and 14 additional tracks, including demos, concert and radio performances, on the second disc. The extended version of "Forest Fire" was not included on this edition.

The album was remastered by Gary Moore from the original master tapes where possible. The CD booklet included comments from Cole and the rest of the band on the various tracks. The BBC tracks were included on the album Live at the BBC Volume 1 released in 2007.

Disc one: As original LP/cassette version of album.

Disc two:

Demos

1. "Are You Ready to Be Heartbroken?" (Cole, Clark) Demo – 2:08
2. "Perfect Skin" Demo – 3:09

Live

3. "Glory" (Tom Verlaine) Live at Nightmoves (15 June 1984) – 2:29
4. "Beautiful City" Live at The Marquee (5 November 1984) – 3:43
5. "Charlotte Street" Live at The Marquee (5 November 1984) – 3:40
6. "Sweetness" Live at The Barrowlands (9 September 1985) – 2:42
7. "2cv" Live at The Barrowlands (9 September 1985) – 2:50

Radio Sessions

8. "Patience" (Cole, Cowan) Saturday Live – BBC Radio 1 Session (26 May 1984) – 3:21
9. "Forest Fire" Richard Skinner Session – BBC Radio 1 (5 July 1984) – 4:13
10. "Speedboat" Richard Skinner Session – BBC Radio 1 (5 July 1984) – 3:59
11. "Rattlesnakes" (Cole, Clark) Richard Skinner Session – BBC Radio 1 (5 July 1984) – 3:29

B-sides/out takes

12. "The Sea and the Sand" – 3:03
13. "You Will Never Be No Good" (Cole, Cowan) – 2:39
14. "Andy's Babies" (Cole, Donegan) – 2:52
15. "Glory" (Tom Verlaine) (B-side of 12" of "Forest Fire") – 2:39
16. "Sweetness" – 2:51
17. "Beautiful City" (Rattlesnakes recording) – 3:37
18. "Jesus Said" (Cole, Clark) (B-side of "My Bag") – 3:13

== Personnel ==
Lloyd Cole and the Commotions

- Neil Clark – guitar
- Lloyd Cole – vocals, guitar
- Blair Cowan – keyboards
- Lawrence Donegan – bass guitar
- Stephen Irvine – drums, tambourine

Production

- Paul Hardiman – producer
- Ric Ocasek – remix on "Perfect Skin", "Four Flights Up" and "Patience"
- Anne Dudley and the Commotions – string arrangements
- Derek MacKillop – management

Artwork

- Robert Farber – cover photo
- Peter Anderson – inner sleeve photo
- Da Gama – cover design

== Charts ==
Chart (1984–1985)	Peak position
Australian Albums (Kent Music Report)	28
Canada Top Albums/CDs (RPM)	68
Dutch Albums (Album Top 100)	17
European Albums (Eurotipsheet)	56
New Zealand Albums (RMNZ)	13
Swedish Albums (Sverigetopplistan)	25
UK Albums (Official Charts)	13

== Certifications ==
Region	Certification	Certified units/sales
United Kingdom (BPI)	Gold	100,000^{^}
^{^} Shipments figures based on certification alone.

== Release history ==
Region	Date	Label	Format	Catalog
United Kingdom	12 October 1984	Polydor	LP	LCLP 1
United Kingdom	12 October 1984	Polydor	Cassette	LCMC 1
Europe	12 October 1984	Polydor	LP	823 683-1
Europe	12 October 1984	Polydor	Cassette	823 683-4
United States	1984	Geffen	LP	GHS 24064
Canada	1984	Geffen	LP	XGHS 24064
Europe	April 1985	Polydor	CD	823 683-2
United States	25 October 1990	Capitol	CD	CDP 7 91182 2
United Kingdom and Europe	4 October 2004	Polydor	2-CD Deluxe Edition	9821820
