= Blair Cowan =

Blair Cowan may refer to:

- Blair Cowan (musician), Scottish musician
- Blair Cowan (rugby union) (born 1986), Scottish rugby union player, born in New Zealand
