= The Bubble (2006 film) =

2006 film by Eytan Fox

- Theatrical poster
- הבועה
- Directed by: Eytan Fox
- Written by: Eytan Fox; Gal Uchovsky
- Produced by: Ronen Ben Tal
- Starring: Ohad Knoller; Alon Friedman; Daniela Virtzer; Yousef 'Joe' Sweid; Shredy Jabarin
- Cinematography: Yaron Scharf
- Edited by: Yosef Grunfeld; Yaniv Raiz
- Music by: Ivri Lider
- Distributed by: United King Films
- Release date: 29 June 2006
- Running time: 117 minutes
- Country: Israel
- Languages: Hebrew; Arabic
- Box office: $1,029,926

The Bubble (Hebrew: הבועה, romanized: HaBuah) is a 2006 romantic drama directed by Eytan Fox telling the story of two men who fall in love, one Israeli and one Palestinian.

The title of the film is the nickname of Tel Aviv for it being a relatively peaceful city, remote from the war actions.

== Plot ==
Noam, a young Israeli reservist working at a checkpoint while on reserve duty, is crushed when he witnesses a Palestinian woman giving birth to a dead baby; he also locks eyes with a young Palestinian man there, Ashraf. He then gets back to Tel Aviv as he has finished his military service. There he shares a flat with another gay man, Yali, and a woman, Lulu, who works in a soap shop. The three roommates live a generally bohemian life.

Ashraf arrives at the apartment to return Noam's passport, which he had dropped and left at the checkpoint. Noam takes Ashraf to the roof to look at the city skyline. They talk and Ashraf kisses Noam and they spend the night together. Soon it is agreed that Ashraf will move in with them and work in Yali's restaurant as a Jew under the name Shimi, as he could not be openly gay in the Palestinian territories like he can in the more liberal and cosmopolitan city of Tel Aviv. For a time, all goes well for the couple despite some jealousy on the part of Yali. However, Ashraf flees to his family in Nablus when he is recognized by Lulu's former boyfriend as a Palestinian. Ashraf does not return any of Noam's calls.

Noam is devastated by Ashraf's desertion, and refuses to get out of bed. When the news reports violence in Ashraf's hometown, Noam becomes worried. He and Lulu go to the West Bank identifying themselves as French television journalists and find Ashraf at his parents' house and there the two men kiss. Ashraf's future brother-in-law, Jihad (who is a Hamas militant), sees them and repudiates him, adding that Ashraf has to marry his cousin or he will reveal his secret. Lulu and Noam leave in a hurry, but encourage Ashraf to come to their anti-occupation rave party. Ashraf shows up, and he and Noam spend another night together.

Before his sister's wedding ceremony, Ashraf tells her he is in love with a man. She angrily refuses to believe him, and Ashraf is devastated. Later, during the wedding, he overhears Jihad planning a bombing in Tel Aviv. Yali is maimed in the bombing, and will never walk again.

The next morning, Ashraf's sister is killed in front of him by stray bullets in a military raid seeking those responsible for the Tel Aviv bombing. At the funeral Jihad promises revenge, telling Ashraf's father that his daughter was a martyr and will not die in vain. Jihad once again demands that Ashraf marry his cousin, revealing a poster of Ashraf's involvement with the Israeli rave. It is clear at this point that Ashraf is walled in and feels no hope of escape from his situation. His brother-in-law, Jihad, decides to avenge the death of his newlywed bride, and while creating a suicide video, Ashraf decides to take Jihad's place as a suicide bomber in Tel Aviv.

Ashraf wanders the streets of Tel Aviv with a sorrowful and blank expression. He winds up at the cafe in which he once worked. When Ashraf primes his explosive belt, Noam sees him from inside the bar where he has just bought Yali's and Lulu's dinner, and rushes out to Ashraf. Seeing Noam, Ashraf walks away from the bar to the middle of the street. As Noam approaches, Ashraf turns to face him. The two stare at each other and start to kiss when the bomb explodes, killing them both. The news report that Ashraf avoided more death by suddenly turning away from the cafe into the empty street. The film ends with Noam talking about the love the two shared, wondering whether they ever had a chance, wishing for a place where they can just love each other, and hoping that people will see "how stupid these wars are", over a scene of young Noam and young Ashraf playing together as children in Jerusalem, their mothers sitting side by side.

== Cast ==
- Ohad Knoller as Noam
- Yousef (Joe) Sweid as Ashraf
- Daniela Virtzer as Lulu
- Alon Friedman (actor) as Yali
- Zohar Liba as Golan
- Ruba Blal as Rana
- Shredy Jabarin as Jihad
- Lior Ashkenazi as himself

== Production ==
The Bubble might be the most personally important film that Eytan Fox has created. In telling about his experiences with coming out of the closet, he described the struggle he and his father experienced in reaching an understanding, which only truly was achieved around the time of filming this project. Very shortly after the film's premiere, and after confessing his final understanding of his son, Eytan's father died due to a heart attack.

== Critical reception ==
The film received mixed reviews from critics. Review aggregator Rotten Tomatoes reports that 51% out of 39 professional critics gave the film a positive review, with a rating average of 5.8/10. Michael Phillips from the Chicago Tribune wrote “Director and co-writer Eytan Fox is going for a sexually democratic, politically aware variation on story themes familiar to “Sex and the City” viewers. (At one point Lulu is referred to as “Miss Israeli Carrie Bradshaw.”) Surprisingly, it works, and the entire cast is excellent.” Sylvie Simmons from the San Francisco Chronicle wrote “The Bubble surprises us at every turn.” Dennis Harvey from Variety wrote “Eytan Fox delivers another involving tale in The Bubble.”

== Background ==
- Eytan Fox has admitted that the film might have been prompted by his memory of falling in love with a Palestinian man when he was going through his military service, when he was eighteen, although he did not follow this through.
- The film was originally meant to be titled Romeo and Julio in reference to Romeo and Juliet, but the title was changed to The Bubble after Eytan Fox was told it would sound like a porn movie.

== Soundtrack ==
HaBuah (The Bubble) (Music from the Motion Picture)

Soundtrack album by Various Artists
- Released: 2006
- Genres: Soundtrack, Pop rock
- Length: 56:57
- Label: HaTav HaShmini

Ivri Lider composed most of the soundtrack for the film, and sings the song "Loving That Man of Mine". He appears as himself singing the theme song of the movie, the Gershwin classic, "The Man I Love". The ending credits of the movie feature "Song to a Siren", a cover of "Song to the Siren" by Tim Buckley.

1. "First Day Of My Life" - Bright Eyes
2. "Always Love" - Nada Surf
3. "Music In A Foreign Language" - Lloyd Cole
4. "The Man I Love" - Gershwin, performed by Ivri Lider
5. "Woman's Realm" - Belle & Sebastian
6. "Tonight Is Forever" - Acid House Kings
7. "Clever and Strong" - Amit Erez
8. "Holly Scott and The Aerial" - Jay Walk Snail (Oren Lahav)
9. "Sit in the Sun" - Keren Ann
10. "Day Out/Close to You" - Antiquex
11. "Birthday Cake" - Ivri Lider
12. "Song to a Siren" - Tim Buckley, performed by Ivri Lider
13. "Aganjú" - Bebel Gilberto
14. "Cada Beijo" - Bebel Gilberto
