= Perfect Skin (Lloyd Cole and the Commotions song) =

1984 song by Lloyd Cole and the Commotions

Single by Lloyd Cole and the Commotions

from the album Rattlesnakes
- B-side: "The Sea and the Sand"
- Released: 11 May 1984
- Studio: The Garden (London)
- Length: 3:10
- Label: Polydor
- Songwriter: Lloyd Cole
- Producer: Paul Hardiman

Lloyd Cole and the Commotions singles chronology
"Perfect Skin" (1984)	"Forest Fire" (1984)

Music video
- "Perfect Skin" on YouTube

"Perfect Skin" is a song by the British rock and pop band Lloyd Cole and the Commotions, released on 11 May 1984 by Polydor Records as the debut single from their debut studio album Rattlesnakes. The song was written by Lloyd Cole and produced by Paul Hardiman. It peaked at number 26 on the UK singles chart and remained in the top 100 for ten weeks.

== Writing ==
Cole wrote and demoed the song during a weekend in 1983, in his room at Glasgow Golf Club, where his parents worked and lived. He demoed the track using a Portastudio, a [Yamaha] DX7 and a drum machine, all of which the band had recently purchased after securing a publishing deal. The band signed a recording contract with Polydor Records shortly after.

Speaking to Melody Maker in 1984, Cole said of the song, "I would say that 'Perfect Skin' is just a few ideas linked by a title. It's just like 'Michelle, ma belle', wee verses that I thought sound good – the literal meaning of the words didn't have a lot to do with it. It was a whole atmosphere." He added in an interview with Sounds, "If I hadn't listened to 'Subterranean Homesick Blues' I could never have written 'Perfect Skin'. I was totally drunk on [Bob] Dylan at the time I wrote that song and all the imagery is deliberately Dylanesque."

== Critical reception ==
Upon its release as a single, Jennet Dainty of Record Mirror described "Perfect Skin" as "avant-garde meets country and western" and "an interesting one that grows and grows". She added, "If Lou Reed had ever sung the lyrics to a spaghetti western this would have been exactly how he'd have done it." Martin Townsend of Number One and stated that it "sounds more like Lou Reed than Lou Reed does these days" and praised the "shamefully infectious melody". Jerry Smith of Music Week considered the band to have the "same pop spirit that produced Aztec Camera and Orange Juice". He noted the sound on "Perfect Skin" is "based on acoustic guitars, with some echoing lead guitar and a soulful vocal that's reminiscent of Paul Haig or Edwyn Collins".

== Track listing ==
7–inch single (UK, European, South Africa, Australasia and Canada)

1. "Perfect Skin" – 3:10
2. "The Sea and the Sand" – 3:03

12–inch single (UK and France)

1. "Perfect Skin" – 3:10
2. "The Sea and the Sand" – 3:03
3. "You Will Never Be No Good" – 2:40

=== 1985 release ===
7–inch single (Germany, the Netherlands and Australasia)

1. "Perfect Skin" (Remix) – 3:10
2. "Andy's Babies" – 2:50

12–inch single (Germany and Australasia)

1. "Perfect Skin" (Remix) – 3:10
2. "Four Flights Up" (Remix) – 2:39
3. "Andy's Babies" – 2:50
4. "Glory" – 2:39

A further remix of the song, 're-produced' by the Irresistible Force (Mixmaster Morris and Des de Moor), appeared on one of the 12–inch issues of the band's "My Bag" single in 1987.

== Personnel ==
Lloyd Cole and the Commotions

- Lloyd Cole – vocals
- Neil Clark – guitar
- Blair Cowan – keyboards
- Lawrence Donegan – bass
- Stephen Irvine – drums

Production

- Paul Hardiman – producer ("Perfect Skin", "The Sea and the Sand", "You Will Never Be No Good", "Andy's Babies", "Glory")
- Ric Ocasek – remixer ("Perfect Skin", "Four Flights Up")
- Peter Watts – producer ("Four Flights Up")

Other

- Peter Anderson, Neil Clark, Lloyd Cole – design (1984 sleeve)
- Da Gama – design (1985 sleeve)

== Charts ==
Chart (1984)	Peak position
Australia (Kent Music Report)	54
Europe (European Top 100 Singles)	62
UK Singles (Official Charts)	26
