= Antidepressant (album) =

Studio album by Lloyd Cole
- Released: 25 September 2006
- Recorded: 2004–2006
- Genre: Pop
- Length: 40:04
- Label: Sanctuary
- Producer: Chris Hughes

Lloyd Cole chronology
| Music in a Foreign Language (2003) | Antidepressant (2006) | Broken Record (2010) |

Antidepressant is the seventh solo studio album by English musician Lloyd Cole, released on 25 September 2006 through Sanctuary Records. It contains a cover of American rock band Moby Grape's "I Am Not Willing" and contributions from Jill Sobule as well as Cole's former Commotions bandmate Neil Clark.

== Critical reception ==
Professional ratings
Review scores
| Source | Rating |
|---|---|
| AllMusic | 4/5 stars |
| Slant Magazine | 4.5/5 stars |

Thom Jurek of AllMusic described the album as "an interesting mirror image to 2003's dark and moody Music in a Foreign Language. These songs are about mid-life, its traps, compromises, disappointments, and the hidden delights found in aging". Jurek concluded that it is "an intimate look at not only aging, but at the gracefulness of it all. Solid, delightful, and moving." Preston Jones of Slant Magazine called Antidepressant "40 minutes of positively luminous pop" in which Cole paints his "anxious desperation as a series of low-key melodies", summarising it as a "prescription for sweetly downcast pop that will cure whatever ails you".

== Track listing ==
All tracks are written by Lloyd Cole, except where noted.

Antidepressant track listing
| No. | Title | Length |
|---|---|---|
| 1. | "The Young Idealists" | 2:43 |
| 2. | "Woman in a Bar" | 3:37 |
| 3. | "NYC Sunshine" | 4:21 |
| 4. | "Antidepressant" | 2:39 |
| 5. | "I Didn't See It Coming" | 3:41 |
| 6. | "How Wrong Can You Be?" | 4:54 |
| 7. | "Everysong" | 2:21 |
| 8. | "I Am Not Willing" (written by Peter Lewis) | 3:51 |
| 9. | "Slip Away" (written by Cole and Neil Clark) | 2:58 |
| 10. | "Travelling Light" | 3:46 |
| 11. | "Rolodex Incident" | 5:13 |
| Total length: | | 40:04 |

== Charts ==
Chart performance for Antidepressant
| Chart (2006) | Peak position |
|---|---|
| French Albums (SNEP) | 152 |
| Swedish Albums (Sverigetopplistan) | 20 |
| UK Albums (OCC) | 156 |
| UK Independent Albums (OCC) | 12 |
