= On Pain =

Studio album by Lloyd Cole
- Released: 23 June 2023
- Studios: The Establishment, Massachusetts
- Genre: Synth-pop
- Length: 37:24
- Label: Edel Music
- Producer: Chris Hughes

Lloyd Cole chronology
Guesswork (2019)	On Pain (2023)

On Pain is the twelfth solo studio album by English musician Lloyd Cole and was released on 23 June 2023 through Edel Music/Earmusic. Like Cole's previous album, Guesswork (2019), On Pain was produced by Chris Hughes and again features contributions from Cole's former Commotions bandmates Blair Cowan and Neil Clark. Cole will embark on a tour of the UK and Ireland later in 2023 in support of the album.

== Background ==
Cole remarked in regards to the album that he is "excited to still be finding new methods, new perspectives, new sounds. The album may be nearing commercial death, but my career has been in that state for almost 30 years and here we are, still, and I still want to make albums. I still want to be heard."

== Singles, (P)Remixes and Videos ==
On April 13 Cole offered up the first taste of On Pain in the form of two "(p)remixes" of album closer "Wolves", one done by Cole himself and the other by synthpop figurehead Martyn Ware, co-founder of The Human League and Heaven 17.

On May 8, Cole dropped upbeat first single "Warm By The Fire", which was inspired by the California wildfires. "Sure, it could be a Ballard story, or it could be a discarded script," Cole says of the song. "It could be a VR game the protagonist is immersed in. It could be happening, it could happen, but maybe it isn't. Maybe it won't."

On May 23 Cole released "Warm By The Fire" - the mini-movie, a collaboration with Canadian film maker Doug Arrowsmith from Feltfilm. It was filmed on the shores of Lake Ontario, and features an interpretive performance by dance artist Nyda Kwasowsky from the National Ballet School of Canada; the video is further punctuated by a handful of Toronto skaters and global riot footage, interspersed with Lloyd's AI generated images of LA. Says Lloyd Cole: "I wanted skateboards. Doug found Nyda. We've ended up with a dance interpretive of something which may or may not be happening."

Second single "The Idiot" - released on August 25 - could be read as a homage to David Bowie's and Iggy Pop's friendship during their Berlin era in the late '70's. According to CLASH Music the video for "The Idiot" is a touching vision of love and friendship, shot not in Berlin but in Toronto's legendary Horseshoe Bar. Directed again by Doug Arrowsmith and starring the dancers Kaelin Isserlin (as 'David') and Ryan Kostyniuk (as 'Jim').

On December 8, 2023, the Wolves Disco and Boogaloo Remixes single was released, featuring 'Wolves' remixes by Mogwai a.o.

== Critical reception ==
Professional ratings
Aggregate scores
Source	Rating
Metacritic	81/100
Review scores
Source	Rating
AllMusic	4/5 stars
MusicOMH	3/5 stars
Uncut	4/5 stars

On Pain received a score of 81 out of 100 on review aggregator Metacritic based on seven critics' reviews, indicating "universal acclaim". Mojo described the album as "a richly detailed synth-pop LP of admirable sophistication", while Uncut's Pete Paphides highlighted the track "Wolves" and wrote that Cole "has become more of what he always was. And somehow he's achieved that by paring his music down to its rawest essence". Tim Sendra of AllMusic concluded that On Pain "is overall both an exciting artistic achievement and a record that should fit the bill for anyone looking for a very cold and sad synth pop update". John Murphy of MusicOMH wrote that "anyone who wants a nostalgia rush back to the Commotions days may be disappointed with On Pain, but for everyone else this is an effective indication of an artist steadily on his own path, and doing very well out of it".

MOJO Magazine listed On Pain at #42 in their best albums of 2023 Top 100, Classic Rock Magazine at #3.

== Track listing ==
On Pain track listing
No.	Title	Length
1.	"On Pain"	4:01
2.	"Warm by the Fire"	4:07
3.	"I Can Hear Everything"	3:29
4.	"The Idiot"	4:17
5.	"You Are Here Now"	5:02
6.	"This Can't Be Happening"	4:10
7.	"More of What You Are"	4:45
8.	"Wolves"	7:33
Total length:		37:24

== Charts ==
Chart performance for On Pain
Chart (2023)	Peak position
Scottish Albums (Official Charts)	17
UK Album Downloads (Official Charts)	47
UK Independent Albums (Official Charts)	9
