= The Bathers (band) =

Scottish chamber pop band

The Bathers are a Scottish chamber pop band. The vehicle for singer-songwriter Chris Thomson, they have released seven albums and have been referred to as "the best-kept secret in Scottish music". They were initially active between 1985 and 2001 and reformed in 2016.

== Biography ==
Chris Thomson originally came to attention with the 1980s Glasgow funk/pop/Celtic soul band Friends Again, which also featured future Love and Money members Paul McGeechan, James Grant and Stuart Kerr. When Friends Again split up in 1985, Thomson secured a solo deal with Go! Discs Records, using the project name of "The Bathers" and drawing on a pool of musicians (including Grant) to flesh out his songs.

The debut Bathers album was 1987's Unusual Places To Die. Recorded with a core band of Thomson, Sam Loup (bass), Jon Turner (keyboards) and James Locke (drums), it gained an enthusiastic critical reception, but label politics limited its success. Thomson went back to the drawing board, changed record labels, and released the follow-up Sweet Deceit on Island Records in 1990, to further critical acclaim. Thomson then took time out from The Bathers to work with two former members of Lloyd Cole and the Commotions (Neil Clark and Stephen Irvine) and Madness bass player Mark Bedford in the one-off band Bloomsday, who released their lone album Fortuny in 1990.

Returning to The Bathers, Thompson signed to the German label Marina Records, which would go on to release three albums by the band – Lagoon Blues (1993), Sunpowder (1995) and Kelvingrove Baby (1997). Working from a floating membership (which still included James Grant, Neil Clark and James Locke) The Bathers now featured string players and arrangers Mark Wilson and Iain White, keyboard player Carlo Scattini and drummer/percussionist Hazel Morrison (who also added operatic soprano backing vocals). Elizabeth Fraser of the Cocteau Twins recorded several tracks with the band on 1995's Sunpowder, and performed live with them in Glasgow. Although Thomson enjoyed a good relationship with Marina, he felt that a label nearer home would be preferable: consequently, The Bathers' sixth album Pandemonia appeared on Wrasse Records in 1999.

By 2001, The Bathers featured Thomson, Morrison, White, Callum McNair (electric guitar), Ken McHugh (bass), Barry Overstreet (saxophone, guitar, vocals) and Robert Henderson (trumpet), but gigs were rare. Despite never formally splitting up, the band quietly bowed out after releasing Desire Regained in 2001 (a compilation of twenty re-recordings of the best known Bathers songs). The Bathers' reputation remained intact despite their retirement – in 2003, The Scotsman listed the fifth Bathers album Kelvingrove Baby at number 42 in its 100 Best Scottish Albums; in 2005 the newspaper put the band's second opus Sweet Deceit as one of their five lost Scottish classic albums.

After fifteen years of inactivity, Chris Thomson reformed The Bathers in January 2016 to play two shows at the Celtic Connections festival in Glasgow, with a lineup of himself, Hazel Morrison and James Grant, plus Maya Burman-Roy, Andrew Cruickshank and Kobus Frick. Subsequently reverting to the Thomson-Morrison-McNair-McHugh lineup, the band announced further dates for October 2016 in Glasgow, Edinburgh and London, as well as reissues of their back catalogue and the recording of a new album. Also in 2016, Thomson was confirmed as one of the main contributors to Paul McGeechan's Starless LP.

In August 2020, 'Lagoon Blues', 'Sunpowder' and 'Kelvingrove Baby' were reissued through Marina Records on limited edition vinyl.

In 2023 The Bathers released their seventh studio album “ Sirenesque” on the Last Night From Glasgow label .

== Personnel ==
=== Current members ===
- Chris Thomson – lead vocals, guitar, piano, keyboards
- Callum McNair – electric guitar, vocals
- Ken McHugh – bass guitar
- Hazel Morrison – drums, percussion, vocals

=== Previous/ensemble members ===
- Sam Loup – bass guitar
- Jon Turner – keyboards
- Mark Wilson – violin
- Iain White – violin, viola
- Fermina Haze – keyboards
- Douglas MacIntyre – bass guitar, mandolin, electric guitar
- Barry Overstreet – saxophone, guitar, vocals
- Robert Henderson – trumpet
- Carlo Scattini – keyboards
- James Grant – guitar
- James Locke – drums, percussion
- Maya Burman-Roy
- Andrew Cruickshank
- Kobus Frick
- Paul Leonard Morgan – piano, keyboards

== Discography ==
=== Albums ===
- Unusual Places to Die (1987), Go! Discs
- Sweet Deceit (1990), Island Records
- Lagoon Blues (1993), Marina Records
- Sunpowder (1995), Marina Records
- Kelvingrove Baby (1997), Marina Records
- Pandemonia (1999), Wrasse Records
- Desire Regained (2001), Wrasse Records
- Summer Lightning (2022), Last Night from Glasgow
- Sirenesque (2023), Last Night from Glasgow

=== Singles ===
- "Fancy Dress" (1987), Go! Discs
- "Twenty-Two" (1999), Wrasse Records
