= Guesswork (album) =

Studio album by Lloyd Cole
- Released: 26 July 2019
- Genre: Electropop
- Length: 44:00
- Label: Edel
- Producers: Chris Hughes; Olaf Opal

Lloyd Cole chronology
Standards (2013)	Guesswork (2019)	On Pain (2023)

Guesswork is the eleventh studio album by English musician Lloyd Cole, released on 26 July 2019 through Edel Music. It includes contributions from his former Commotions bandmates Blair Cowan and Neil Clark, and was produced by Chris Hughes and Olaf Opal.

== Critical reception ==
Professional ratings
Aggregate scores
Source	Rating
Metacritic	75/100
Review scores
Source	Rating
AllMusic	4/5 stars
The Observer	3/5 stars
PopMatters	7/10
The Skinny	2/5 stars

Guesswork received a score of 75 out of 100 based on nine critics' reviews on review aggregator Metacritic, indicating "generally favorable" reception. Q felt that "A couple of other tracks veer too close to pastiche, but taken as a whole, this is a rich, brave, eloquent piece of work", while Uncut pointed to the length of the songs (three of the eight being under five minutes) as making them "a little ponderous, but clearly, our expectations are of little concern".

Mark Deming of AllMusic wrote that the album provides "a little bit of both" Cole's types of solo work, "literate and well-crafted pop songs" and "experimental synthesizer projects", and Cole is "writing and singing near the top of his game. But this time, the melodies are performed on a variety of vintage synthesizers and rhythm machines, many of which give this album a sound that's sleek and evocative, but a decade or three out of date". Reviewing the album for PopMatters, Christopher Laird described Guesswork as Cole "going electropop", writing that it "offers a new palette of sounds that deepen the impact of his wordy ramblings". Laird went on to note that the album "finds him trying to fuse his typical indie rock bent with his electronic adventures. It's fresh ground for Cole. Occasionally, it expands the impact. Otherwise, it's more of the same with a different package [...] lyrical snark backed by windy riffs and concrete choruses".

Phil Mongredien of The Observer concurred with Deming regarding Cole melding the two sides of his work, finding it to "combin[e] the two strands, with conventional song structures fleshed out by synths" and that while it "starts promisingly, with the honourable exception of the sparkling 'Moments and Whatnot' the second half of this front-loaded album is a little underwhelming, its songs needlessly extended when a more succinct execution might have worked better". Pete Wild of The Skinny called Guesswork a "keyboard-heavy record that doesn't hit all the right notes" with occasional good moments but that "for the most part, it feels like a pedestrian Morrissey album (without, of course, the taint of dubious politics). It's great that he's trying out new things, it's just that this avenue is one-way and ends in a dead-end".

== Track listing ==
Guesswork track listing
No.	Title	Length
1.	"The Over Under"	7:06
2.	"Night Sweats"	6:19
3.	"Violins"	6:48
4.	"Remains"	5:09
5.	"The Afterlife"	4:28
6.	"Moments and Whatnot"	4:13
7.	"When I Came Down from the Mountain"	4:50
8.	"The Loudness Wars"	5:21
Total length:		44:00

== Charts ==
Chart performance for Guesswork
Chart (2019)	Peak position
German Albums (Offizielle Top 100)	93
Swiss Albums (Schweizer Hitparade)	84
UK Albums (Official Charts)	75
Scottish Albums (Official Charts)	17
UK Independent Albums (Official Charts)	4
