= Are You Ready to Be Heartbroken? =

Single by Sandie Shaw
- B-side: "Steven (You Don't Eat Meat)"
- Released: 1986
- Genre: Pop
- Length: 3:42
- Label: Polydor
- Songwriters: Neil Clark; Lloyd Cole
- Producers: Clive Langer; Alan Winstanley

Sandie Shaw singles chronology
| "Hand in Glove" (1984) | "Are You Ready to Be Heartbroken?" (1986) | "Frederick" (1986) |

Music video
- "Are You Ready to Be Heartbroken?" on YouTube

"Are You Ready to Be Heartbroken?" is a song by the British rock and pop band Lloyd Cole and the Commotions, released on their debut studio album, Rattlesnakes (1984). It was covered by Sandie Shaw in 1986. Her version reached number 68 on the UK singles chart in June that year. In 2006, the Scottish band Camera Obscura released an answer song, "Lloyd, I'm Ready to Be Heartbroken", on their album Let's Get Out of This Country.

== Charts ==
Chart performance for "Are You Ready to Be Heartbroken?" by Sandie Shaw
| Chart (1986) | Peak position |
|---|---|
| UK Singles (Official Charts) | 68 |
