= Dave Derby =

American songwriter

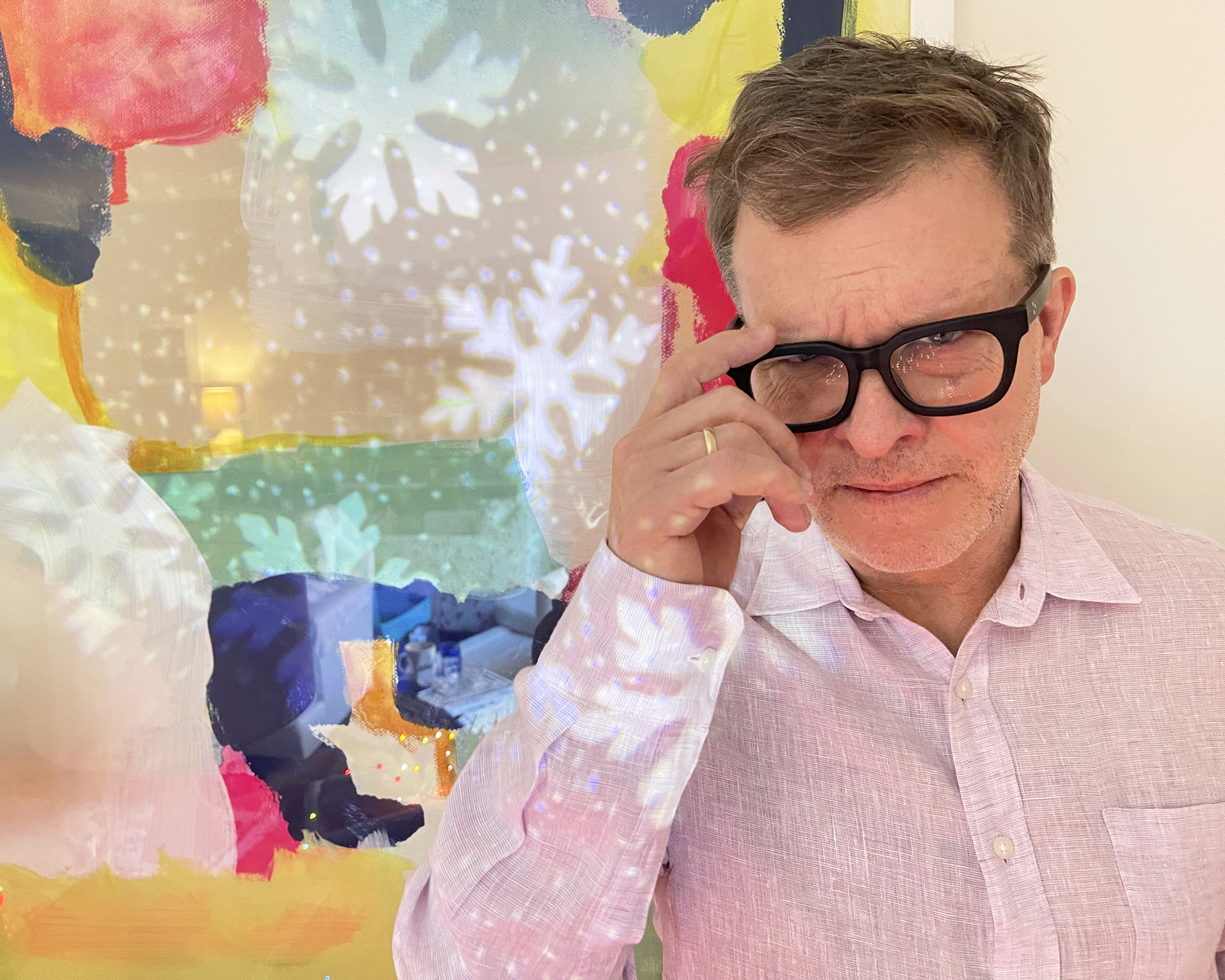
- Dave Derby photo by Debora Francis

Background information
- Occupations: Songwriter, Producer, Composer
- Labels: Magic Door, Reveal Records

Dave Derby is an American songwriter, recording artist, producer, and composer who was born in Honolulu, Hawaii and now resides in New York City.

Derby serves as a songwriter and producer for the Dambuilders, and Gramercy Arms, a New York City musical and artist collective featuring members of Luna, Elk City, The Dambuilders, Guided by Voices, Shudder to Think, Joan As Police Woman, Mascott, Sparklehorse and A Girl Called Eddy, as well as notable artists such as Lloyd Cole, Tanya Donelly, Matthew Caws, Doug Gillard, Diesel and Kay Hanley. Derby has also produced albums for Reveal Records.

== Recordings ==
=== The Dambuilders ===
Dave was a founding member of The Dambuilders, a band in the early 1990s Boston rock scene. The founding members: Derby, Tryan George, and Eric Masunaga, all from Hawaii had played in different incarnations (such as the Exactones, Papaya, Pomade, Green-Eyed Tiki and Chicken Eats the Worm) before moving to Boston in 1990. The band began as the Dambuilders in Hawaii in a three-piece and four-piece configuration. Early violin was provided by Debbie Fox. With Fox's involvement, nearly all of the band's songs had electric violin tracks. Around 1992, the "classic line-up" consisted of Derby (bass guitar and lead vocals), Masunaga (guitar), Kevin March (drums), and Joan Wasser (violin). The band reformed in 2026, featuring original members, Derby, March, and Masunaga, as well as new members Sean Eden (Luna) on guitar and Claudia Chopek (Bright Eyes, Father John Misty, Dexys) on violin.

=== Gramercy Arms ===
Gramercy Arms has released three albums. Their first eponymous album was released on Reveal Records and Cheap Lullaby Records in 2008. Their second album, The Seasons of Love was released in 2014 on Reveal Records. The album received a positive review in The Wall Street Journal. A video was released on YouTube for the album's song "Beautiful Disguise" which featured Lloyd Cole and Joan Wasser on lead vocals. Their third album, Deleted Scene, was released on Magic Door Records in April 2023 and their fourth album, The Making Of The Making Of, was released on Magic Door in April 2024.

=== Lloyd Cole ===
Following the dissolution of the Dambuilders in 1996, Dave formed a lo-fi home-recording-focused musical project called Brilliantine. Dave's friend Claudia Gonson (The Magnetic Fields) introduced him to Lloyd Cole who was initially interested in producing Brilliantine only to join as keyboardist. When Cole's bassist was unavailable for a tour of the US and Brazil, Dave was recruited to play bass in Lloyd Cole's band The Negatives. Derby and Cole have co-written numerous songs and shared production credits for both of their respective musical projects.

=== Other projects ===
In 2003 Derby released his first solo album Even Further Behind on Badman Recordings and in 2007 released Dave Derby and the Norfolk Downs on Reveal Records.

=== Film and TV ===
Derby has also composed and produced music for film and TV including a song that he co-wrote with Michael Kotch and Colleen Fitzpatrick (Vitamin C) for Hannah Montana in Hannah Montana: The Movie .

Derby wrote and performed music for Sam Seder's 1997 film Who's the Caboose? as well as the theme song for the miniseries sequel Pilot Season starring Sarah Silverman. The song eventually became the end theme for The Majority Report with Sam Seder.

Derby is currently producing a documentary of the Dambuilders, directed by Bruno Corbo and Zeke Bowman.
