= Paul Hardiman =

British record producer

- Origin: United Kingdom
- Genres: Pop; rock
- Occupations: Record producer

Paul Hardiman is a British record producer. He worked with Lloyd Cole and the Commotions (on their debut Rattlesnakes) and Lloyd Cole's solo career. His other production credits include Chris de Burgh's most commercially successful albums Into the Light (including worldwide hit "The Lady in Red") and Flying Colours, as well as Soul Mining by the The.

== Partial list of credited works ==
- 1972 – Hogwash – the Groundhogs
- 1973 – Mystery to Me – Fleetwood Mac
- 1973 – The Session – Jerry Lee Lewis
- 1974 – Here Come the Warm Jets – Brian Eno
- 1974 – The Hoople – Mott the Hoople
- 1975 – Panic – Zzebra
- 1976 – Ramshackled – Alan White
- 1977 – Before We Were So Rudely Interrupted – the Animals
- 1977 – Pink Flag – Wire
- 1977 – Whatever Happened to Slade? – Slade
- 1977 – White Rock [Original Motion Picture Soundtrack] – Rick Wakeman
- 1978 – Chairs Missing – Wire
- 1978 – The Shirts – the Shirts
- 1979 – 154 – Wire
- 1979 – Imperial Wizard – David Essex
- 1980 – Live in Europe – Leo Kottke
- 1981 – Nighthawks [Original Soundtrack] – Keith Emerson
- 1981 – Non-Stop Erotic Cabaret – Soft Cell
- 1981 – Tainted Love/Where Did Our Love Go – Soft Cell
- 1982 – The Dreaming – Kate Bush
- 1983 – Soul Mining – the The
- 1984 – Rattlesnakes – Lloyd Cole / Lloyd Cole and the Commotions
- 1985 – Call and Response – Zeke Manyika
- 1985 – Eventide – the Faith Brothers
- 1985 – From Across the Kitchen Table – the Pale Fountains
- 1985 – Hounds of Love – Kate Bush
- 1985 – If You Can't Please Yourself You Can't Please Your Soul
- 1986 – Best Revenge [Original Soundtrack] – Keith Emerson
- 1986 – Boat to Bolivia – Martin Stephenson / Martin Stephenson & the Daintees
- 1986 – Into the Light – Chris de Burgh
- 1986 – Swimmer – the Big Dish
- 1987 – Just Say Yes: Sire's Winter CD Music Sampler
- 1988 – Bringing Home the Ashes – the Wild Swans
- 1988 – Flying Colours – Chris de Burgh
- 1988 – Just Say Yo: Vol. 2 of Just Say Yes
- 1988 – Voice of Reason – Fountainhead
- 1989 – 1984–1989 – Lloyd Cole and the Commotions
- 1989 – Spark to a Flame: The Very Best of Chris de Burgh – Chris de Burgh
- 1989 – Working Girl [Original Soundtrack] – Carly Simon
- 1990 – Lloyd Cole – Lloyd Cole
- 1991 – Don't Get Weird on Me Babe – Lloyd Cole
- 1991 – Lady in Red: The Very Best of Chris de Burgh – Chris de Burgh
- 1991 – She's a Girl and I'm a Man – Lloyd Cole
- 1991 – The Real People – the Real People
- 1991 – Twist – Fat Lady Sings
- 1993 – Now: 1986 [1993]
- 1993 – Walk the Big Circle – Andy Halsey
- 1994 – Hardest Hits, Vol. 5
- 1996 – Our Friends Electric [2 CDs]
- 1996 – This Is the 80's [Alex]
- 1997 – The Love Songs – Chris de Burgh
- 1998 – All Time Greatest Movie Songs [UK]
- 1998 – The Collection – Lloyd Cole
- 1998 – There's Something About Mary
- 1999 – Now: 1986 [1999]
- 1999 – The Complete London Sessions, Vol. 1 – Jerry Lee Lewis
- 2000 – Pink Flag/Chairs Missing/154 – Wire
- 2000 – Pure Love
- 2000 – Recollections: The Very Best of Rick Wakeman – Rick Wakeman
- 2001 – Class of 84 – Visco Space
- 2001 – I Want My 80's Box
- 2001 – Notes from Planet Earth: The Best of Chris de Burgh – Chris de Burgh
- 2001 – The Ultimate Collection – Chris de Burgh
- 2002 – 45 RPM: The Singles of The The – the The
- 2002 – Immer Wieder Schlager
- 2002 – London Town 1983–1993 – the The
- 2002 – The Twelve Inch Singles – Soft Cell
- 2003 – Dark Side of the 80s
- 2003 – Hardest Hits [Box]
- 2004 – 20th Century Masters – The Millennium Collection: The Best of Chris de Burgh – Chris de Burgh
- 2004 – The Singles – Lloyd Cole
- 2005 – At the Movies – Keith Emerson
- 2006 – Beautiful Dreams: Live – Chris de Burgh
- 2007 – Burning Sounds: 20 Killer Power Pop Cuts
- 2007 – Live at the BBC, Vol. 1 [Lloyd Cole & the Commotions] – Lloyd Cole and the Commotions
- 2009 – Cleaning Out the Ashtrays – Lloyd Cole
- 2010 – Flying Colours/Man on the Line – Chris de Burgh
- 2011 – 12" '80s Classics
- 2011 – Best of My Love (Songs from the Heart 1961–2011)
- 2011 – Tales of Taliesin: The EMI Years Anthology 1975–1981 – Soft Machine
- 2012 – A&M 50: The Anniversary Collection
- 2012 – Para Ti Papá
- 2012 – The Art of the 12", Vol. 2: A Promotion of a Way of Life
- 2013 – Classic Album Selection – Chris de Burgh
- 2015 – Collected Recordings: 1983–1989 – Lloyd Cole / Lloyd Cole and the Commotions
- 2017 – In New York: Collected Recordings 1988–1996 – Lloyd Cole
- 2017 – So Fresh: Greatest Hits of the 80's
- 2018 – Remastered, Part I – Kate Bush
- 2018 – Remastered, Part II – Kate Bush
- 2020 – (I Can't Get No) Satisfaction – Jerry Lee Lewis
- 2020 – Cum On Feel the Hitz: The Best of Slade – Slade
- 2020 – The Best of Rory Gallagher [Universal] – Rory Gallagher
- 2021 – 12" '80s Classics [2021]
- 2023 – The Other Side of Slade: The 70's – Slade
- 2024 – Deadpool & Wolverine [Original Motion Picture Soundtrack]
- 2024 – Eno: A Rather Deep Level – Brian Eno
- 2024 – Eno: Retrace Your Steps – Brian Eno
- 2025 – Tainted Love/Where Did Our Love Go? [2023 Extended Version] – Soft Cell
