= Lloyd Cole =

English singer-songwriter (born 1961)

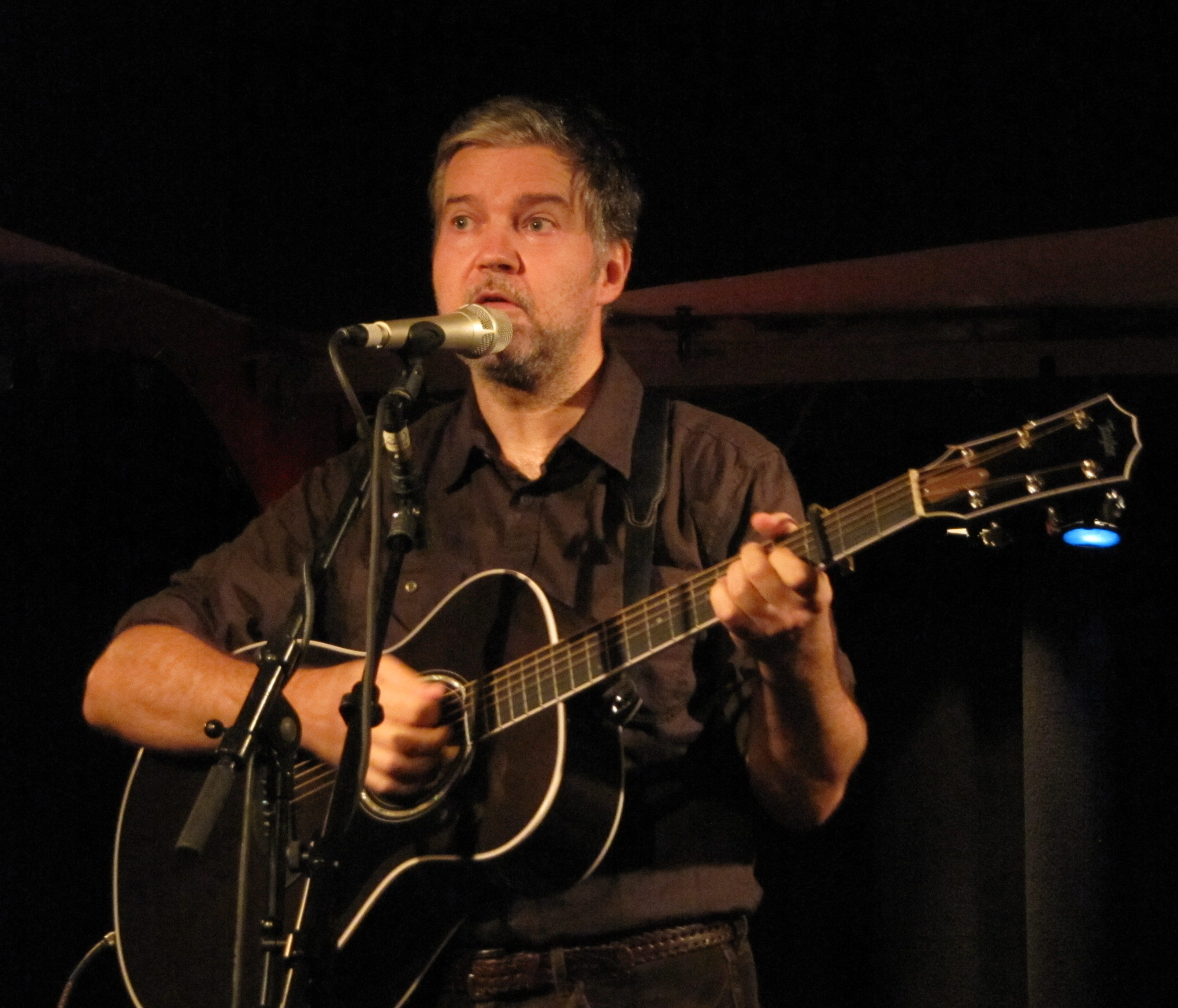
- Publicity portrait of Cole, c. 2010

Background information
- Born: 31 January 1961 (age 65); Buxton, Derbyshire, England
- Origin: Chapel-en-le-Frith, Derbyshire, England
- Genres: Rock; pop; indie pop
- Occupations: Singer; songwriter; musician
- Instruments: Vocals; guitar; harmonica; synthesizers; piano; bass; banjo
- Years active: 1984–present
- Labels: Polydor; Capitol; Sanctuary; One Little Indian; earMUSIC
- Formerly of: Lloyd Cole and the Commotions; the Negatives
- Website: lloydcole.com

Lloyd Cole (born 31 January 1961) is an English singer, songwriter and musician. He was lead vocalist of Lloyd Cole and the Commotions from 1984 to 1989 and subsequently worked solo.

== Early life ==
Cole was born in Buxton, Derbyshire, England. He grew up in nearby Chapel-en-le-Frith and went to New Mills Comprehensive School and later attended Runshaw College in Leyland, Lancashire. He studied a year of law at University College London but switched to the University of Glasgow, where he studied philosophy and English, and also met the future members of the Commotions.

== Career ==
=== 1984–1989: Lloyd Cole and the Commotions ===
The Commotions' debut studio album, Rattlesnakes (1984), contained literary and pop culture references to such figures as Arthur Lee, Norman Mailer, Grace Kelly, Eva Marie Saint, Simone de Beauvoir, Truman Capote and Joan Didion. The band produced two more studio albums, Easy Pieces (1985) and Mainstream (1987), before disbanding in 1989.

Songs by the band include "Perfect Skin", "Rattlesnakes", "Forest Fire", "Are You Ready to Be Heartbroken?", "Lost Weekend" and "Jennifer She Said". Cole subsequently relocated to New York City and recorded with various musicians, including Fred Maher, Robert Quine and Matthew Sweet.

=== 1990–1992: Lloyd Cole and Don't Get Weird on Me Babe ===
This solo setting produced two studio albums: Lloyd Cole in 1990 – preceded by the single "No Blue Skies" – and Don't Get Weird on Me Babe in 1991. The latter was recorded in two parts: one side continued the New York rock of his debut solo studio album, while the other side featured a session orchestra, much in the style of Burt Bacharach or Scott Walker. While he remained with Polydor as his record label, the US distribution contract with Capitol Records ended (US rights were picked up by Rykodisc). "She's a Girl and I'm a Man", "Weeping Wine" and "Butterfly" were released as singles.

"Downtown" (from Lloyd Cole, 1990) was featured in the American psychological thriller film Bad Influence (1990) – starring Rob Lowe and James Spader – while "Pay for It" (from Don't Get Weird on Me Babe, 1991) was on the soundtrack of When the Party's Over, starring Sandra Bullock.

=== 1993–1999: Bad Vibes, Love Story and The Collection ===
Cole recorded Bad Vibes in 1993, a collaboration with producer and remixer Adam Peters, using a harder sound. "So You'd Like to Save the World" and "Morning Is Broken" were released as singles.

Love Story (1995) was recorded with the help of Stephen Street (who has worked with Blur and the Smiths) and former Commotion Neil Clark. It produced a minor hit with the song "Like Lovers Do", affording Cole a mid-1990s appearance on Top of the Pops.

=== 2000–2009: The Negatives, Music in a Foreign Language, Antidepressant ===
In 1997 and 1998, Cole played with some New York musicians under the name the Negatives. The group consisted of Jill Sobule, Dave Derby of the Dambuilders, Mike Kotch and Rafa Maciejak, who recorded an eponymous CD, released mainly in Western Europe and North America.

He has since released solo albums on smaller independent labels. Sanctuary Records released Music in a Foreign Language (2003) in the UK. Recorded largely by Cole himself (including tracks recorded directly onto a Mac), the songs had a stark, folk-inspired singer-songwriter style. The album was released in the US by the One Little Indian label, which also collected a number of outtakes (recorded from 1996 to 2000) on 2002's Etc. and released an instrumental ambient electronica album, Plastic Wood, the same year. It featured new versions of Nick Cave's "People Ain't No Good" and his own "No More Love Songs".

In 2004, to mark the 20th anniversary of the release of Rattlesnakes, Lloyd Cole and the Commotions reformed to perform a one-off tour of the UK and Ireland. The reformation was never intended to be permanent, and Cole released another solo studio album in 2006, Antidepressant, using his usual home recording outfit by playing all the instruments himself with friends like Sobule, Derby and the guitar work of former Commotion Neil Clark on some tracks.

In 2009, Cole released Cleaning Out the Ashtrays – a collection of outtakes, B-sides, rarities and alternative versions of his solo work. Notable cover versions include Leonard Cohen's "Chelsea Hotel #2", T. Rex's "The Children of the Revolution" and Kris Kristofferson's "For the Good Times", which he recorded with Jill Sobule.

=== 2010–2018: Broken Record, Standards and Selected Studies Vol. 1 ===
Broken Record, released in September 2010 preceded by the single "Writer's Retreat", marked a departure from his solo recordings, as it was performed by a band of longstanding friends and working partners, including Fred Maher, Joan As Police Woman, Rainy Orteca, Dave Derby and Blair Cowan – as well as two musicians, Matt Cullen (guitar; banjo) and Mark Schwaber (guitar; mandolin), with whom Cole tours, billed as 'Lloyd Cole Small Ensemble'. The recording of the album was entirely financed by advance purchases by his fans and contributions from Tapete Records, which later distributed the album and also oversaw and negotiated the rights to release a boxed set with his complete collection of B-sides, alternative takes and previously unreleased material, under the title Cleaning Out the Ashtrays.

A further album co-funded by fans, Standards, was released in June 2013, and includes contributions from Fred Maher and Matthew Sweet, Blair Cowan (The Commotions) and Joan Wasser (a.k.a. Joan As Police Woman). It was preceded by the single and music video "Period Piece". Other notable songs on the album were Cole's re-make of John Hartford's "California Earthquake", "Women's Studies" and favourite "Myrtle and Rose". For the first time since 1999's The Collection, Cole appeared on the UK Albums Chart for one week at position 74.

In February 2013 a new album of electronic music by Cole and Hans-Joachim Roedelius was released, called Selected Studies Vol. 1.

In 2016, Cole went on tour with the Leopards to celebrate the release of the Lloyd Cole and the Commotions Collected Recordings 1983–1988 box set. Live album Lloyd Cole and the Leopards – Live at Brooklyn Bowl was released through his website along with several live recordings of shows he performed with his son William on guitar.

In early 2017 the single "Man on the Verge" was released as a taster for the Lloyd Cole in New York – Collected Recordings 1988–1996 box set.

=== Since 2019: Guesswork and On Pain ===
Cole's eleventh studio album Guesswork was released on 26 July 2019 by earMUSIC. Recorded (mostly) in his attic studio in Massachusetts, Guesswork was produced by Cole and mixed by German producer Olaf Opal, with executive production from Chris Hughes. The record was mastered by Kai Blankenberg at Skyline Tonfabrik in Düsseldorf. The electronic sounding album also featured contributions from, among others, Fred Maher and former Commotions Blair Cowan and Neil Clark. It was preceded by the singles "Violins" and "Night Sweats".

In 2021, Cleaning Out the Ashtrays – the 2009 collection of outtakes, alternative versions of his solo work, and cover versions – was released digitally.

On 30 January 2023, Cole announced his twelfth studio album On Pain to be released on 23 June 2023: an album featuring eight songs recorded in Cole's attic and produced by Chris Merrick Hughes. Four of the songs are co-written by founding Commotions members Blair Cowan and Neil Clark. It was preceded by the upbeat single and music video "Warm by the Fire". It received 4-star reviews by Uncut, Mojo and AllMusic and it entered the UK Albums Chart at number 23.

The second single "The Idiot" – released on 25 August 2023 – is a homage to David Bowie's and Iggy Pop's friendship during their Berlin era in the late 1970s. According to Clashmusic.com, the video for "The Idiot" is a touching vision of love and friendship, shot not in Berlin but in Toronto's legendary Horseshoe Bar.

The first leg of the On Pain Tour started in Newcastle on October 6, 2023 and finished in Amsterdam on November 6. The show consisted of a semi-acoustic part and an electric part, both performed with Commotions co-founders Blair Cowan and Neil Clark, and Icelandic drummer Signy Jakobsdottir.

On 8 December 2023, the Wolves Disco and Boogaloo Remixes single was released, featuring 'Wolves' remixes by Mogwai a.o.

== Personal life ==
Cole married his American wife, Elizabeth Lewis, in December 1989. They live in Easthampton, Massachusetts.

== Cover versions ==
Some of Cole's songs have been covered by other artists. "Rattlesnakes" has been covered by Tori Amos on her concept album Strange Little Girls (2001), while Sandie Shaw released a version of "(Are You) Ready to Be Heartbroken?" in 1986.

In 2006, Scottish indie pop band Camera Obscura released the song "Lloyd, I'm Ready to Be Heartbroken" as an answer song to Cole's 1984 hit "Are You Ready to Be Heartbroken?".

== Discography ==
Lloyd Cole and the Commotions

- Rattlesnakes (1984)
- Easy Pieces (1985)
- Mainstream (1987)

Lloyd Cole and the Negatives

- The Negatives (2000)

Solo

- Lloyd Cole (1990)
- Don't Get Weird on Me Babe (1991)
- Bad Vibes (1993)
- Love Story (1995)
- Plastic Wood (2001)
- Music in a Foreign Language (2003)
- Antidepressant (2006)
- Cleaning Out The Ashtrays (2009) (Collected b-sides and rarities 1989-2006)
- Broken Record (2010)
- Standards (2013)
- 1D Electronics 2012–2014 (2015)
- Guesswork (2019)
- On Pain (2023)
