= Lloyd Cole and the Commotions =

British rock/pop band

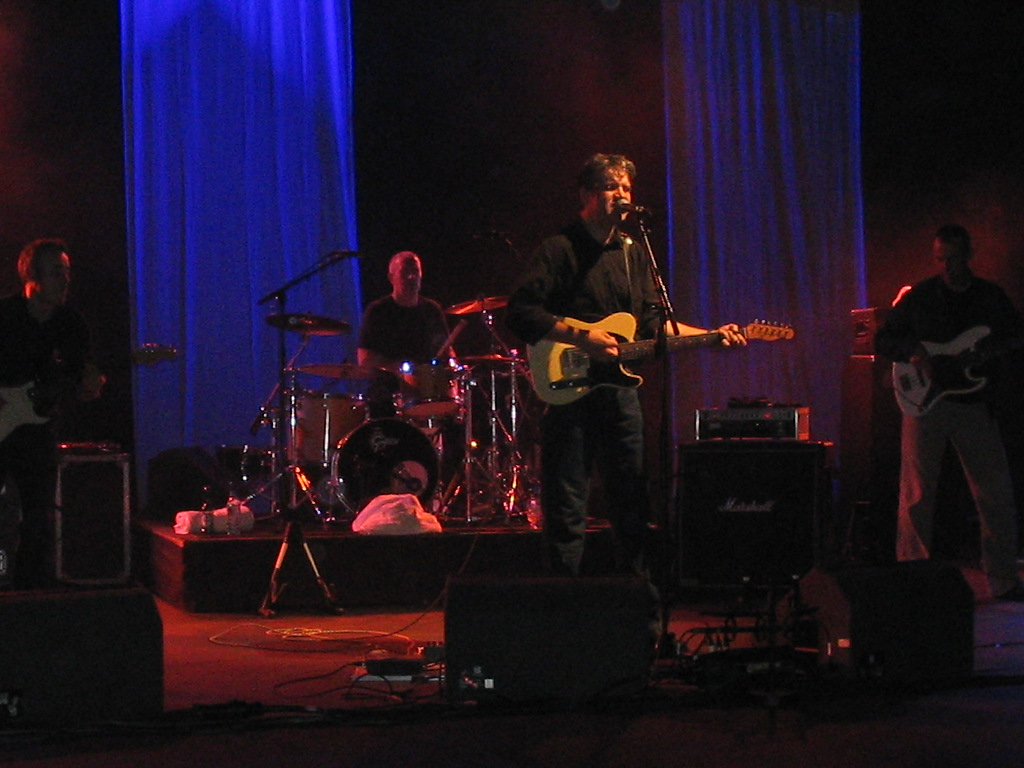
- Lloyd Cole and the Commotions performing in London, 2004

Background information
- Origin: Glasgow, Scotland
- Genres: Jangle pop; indie pop; new wave; pop rock
- Years active: 1982–1989; 2004; 2009
- Labels: Polydor; Geffen; Capitol
- Members: Lloyd Cole; Blair Cowan; Lawrence Donegan; Neil Clark; Stephen Irvine

Lloyd Cole and the Commotions were a British rock and pop band that formed in Glasgow, Scotland in 1982. Between 1984 and 1989, the band scored four Top 20 albums and five Top 40 singles in the UK; it also had success in several other countries including Australia, the Netherlands, Sweden and New Zealand. After they broke up in 1989, Cole embarked on a solo career but the band reformed briefly in 2004 to perform a 20th anniversary mini-tour of the UK and Ireland.

== Band history ==
The band were formed whilst Cole (who was born in Derbyshire, England) was studying at the University of Glasgow. They signed a recording contract with Polydor Records; their debut single "Perfect Skin" reaching number 26 on the UK singles chart in spring 1984, while the second single "Forest Fire" reached 41. Their debut studio album, Rattlesnakes, was released in October 1984. Produced by Paul Hardiman and featuring string arrangements by Anne Dudley, it peaked at No. 13 in the UK and was certified gold for sales over 100,000 copies. NME included it in its Top 100 Albums of All Time list, and the title track was later covered by the American singer Tori Amos. The Welsh band Manic Street Preachers included the album amongst their favorite albums list and the Scottish indie pop band Camera Obscura named their single "Lloyd, I'm ready to be heartbroken" after The Commotions' "Are you ready to be heartbroken?"

The band's follow-up studio album, Easy Pieces, was produced by Clive Langer and Alan Winstanley, who had previously produced for Madness, the Teardrop Explodes, Dexys Midnight Runners and Elvis Costello and the Attractions. Released in November 1985, the album was a quicker commercial success than its predecessor (entering the UK Albums Chart at No. 5, and certified gold within a month). The singles "Brand New Friend" and "Lost Weekend" were the band's first and only UK top 20 hits (reaching No. 19 and No. 17 respectively).

Two years later, the band released their third and final studio album, Mainstream. Produced by Ian Stanley (former songwriter and keyboardist of Tears for Fears), the album peaked at No. 9 in the UK and was also certified gold, but contained only one UK top 40 single, "Jennifer She Said" (No. 31). Its first single "My Bag", and a later release, the "From the Hip" EP, failed to make the top 40.

In 1989, the band decided to break up and released a "best of" compilation, 1984–1989, which was their fourth top 20 album (UK No. 14) and fourth gold certification. Following this, Cole embarked on a solo career with the release of his eponymous debut studio album in 1990.

On the first two Commotions albums, Cole was the band's principal songwriter (though he co-wrote several songs with various bandmembers). The third studio album is credited to the band as a whole.

During 2004, Lloyd Cole and the Commotions reunited for a month to celebrate the release of the Rattlesnakes deluxe edition. Rehearsals were in Glasgow and the band played to packed houses at the Barrowlands, and then in Dublin, Manchester and London.

== Band members ==
- Lloyd Cole (born 31 January 1961) – lead vocals, guitar, lyricist
- Blair Cowan (born 1960?) – keyboards
- Lawrence Donegan (born 13 July 1961) – bass guitar
- Neil Clark (born 3 July 1958) – guitar
- Stephen Irvine (born 16 December 1959) – drums

== Post-breakup careers ==
- Cole moved to New York City and later to New England to pursue a solo career with Polydor and Capitol Records and later appeared on Rykodisc, before establishing self-published entities in the United States. His solo career has found him collaborating with the late Robert Quine, Fred Maher, Matthew Sweet, Dave Derby and Jill Sobule.
- Clark continued working with Cole on almost all of his solo releases and full band tours. He was also a member of the short-lived group Bloomsday, with Irvine (of the Commotions) and Chris Thomson of the Bathers. He later worked as a website designer and wrote music for film and TV.
- Cowan collaborated with Cole and his new backing band in New York on Cole's first two solo studio albums (1989–1991). He returned for Broken Record (2010), Standards (2013), Guesswork (2019) and On Pain (2023). He played with Del Amitri, Paul Quinn and the Independent Group, the Kevin McDermott Orchestra and Texas.
- Donegan is a journalist and an author – he was a golf journalist for The Guardian and published several non-fiction titles, including No News at Throat Lake and Four Iron in the Soul.
- Irvine joined former bandmate Clark in Bloomsday, and as a session musician worked with Del Amitri, Étienne Daho and Sarah Cracknell. He is also managing artists and bands.

== Discography ==
- Rattlesnakes (1984, No. 13 UK)
- Easy Pieces (1985, No. 5 UK)
- Mainstream (1987, No. 9 UK)
