= Lawrence Donegan =

Scottish journalist and former musician

Lawrence Donegan (born 13 July 1961) is a Scottish journalist and former musician.

== Life and career ==
Donegan was born on 13 July 1961 in Stirling, and educated at St Modan's High School in Stirling and at the University of Glasgow, where his musical career began.

He was the bassist in The Bluebells, whose biggest hit was "Young at Heart", and Lloyd Cole and the Commotions. After the latter group split, Donegan became a journalist and an author. Between these roles, he worked as the House of Commons assistant to Labour MP Brian Wilson. Whilst in that role, he was part of a one-off band called the Stop Its that recorded an anti-poll tax song of a similar name. The band included David Hill, later press spokesman for Tony Blair, and Tim Luckhurst, who was later briefly editor of The Scotsman newspaper, and is now the head of South College at Durham University.

He worked at The Scotsman and is now a golf journalist for The Guardian. He has held a post with The Guardian since 2004, although he has been at the newspaper since 1994, as a general reporter and then as Scotland correspondent from 1997 to 2004. During the 2010 Winter Olympics, Donegan gained notoriety for his overly critical reviews of the games. Journalists believed that his harsh reviews and similar critiques coming from the British media were made as an attempt to make the games look bad as the following Olympics would be held in London. In 2012, The Guardian made a tongue-in-cheek reference to the severe criticism of the prior Games by inviting a Canadian journalist to similarly critique the Summer Olympics in London as the 'worst ever'.

Donegan has written non-fiction books:

- Four Iron in the Soul (Penguin, 1998) – the story of his year caddying for Ross Drummond, the 438th-best golfer in the world at the time, also published as Maybe It Should Have Been A 3-Iron in North America.
- California Dreaming: A Smooth-running, Low-mileage, Cut-price American Adventure (Washington Square Press, 1999) – about the time he spent as a used-car salesman in the United States.
- No News at Throat Lake (Penguin, 2000) – about working for a bi-weekly newspaper in the small County Donegal village of Creeslough in the west of Ulster.
- Quiet Please (Yellow Jersey Press, 2004) – about his experiences as a Ryder Cup steward.
- Shergar: The Final Word (HarperCollins, 2009) – the story of the kidnapping of the racehorse Shergar.
