= Stephen Irvine =

Scottish musician

- Born: 16 December 1959 (age 66)
- Origin: Scotland
- Genres: Pop; rock; indie pop
- Occupation: Instrumentalist
- Instrument: Drums
- Formerly of: Lloyd Cole and the Commotions

Stephen Irvine (born 16 December 1959) is a Scottish musician, formerly a member of Lloyd Cole and the Commotions. Following the breakup of that band, he continued to work in the music industry and as a session musician worked with Del Amitri, Étienne Daho and Sarah Cracknell. He was part of the band Bloomsday (with fellow Commotions member Neil Clark), managed the band Cherry Falls and worked with MTV.
