= Blair Cowan (musician) =

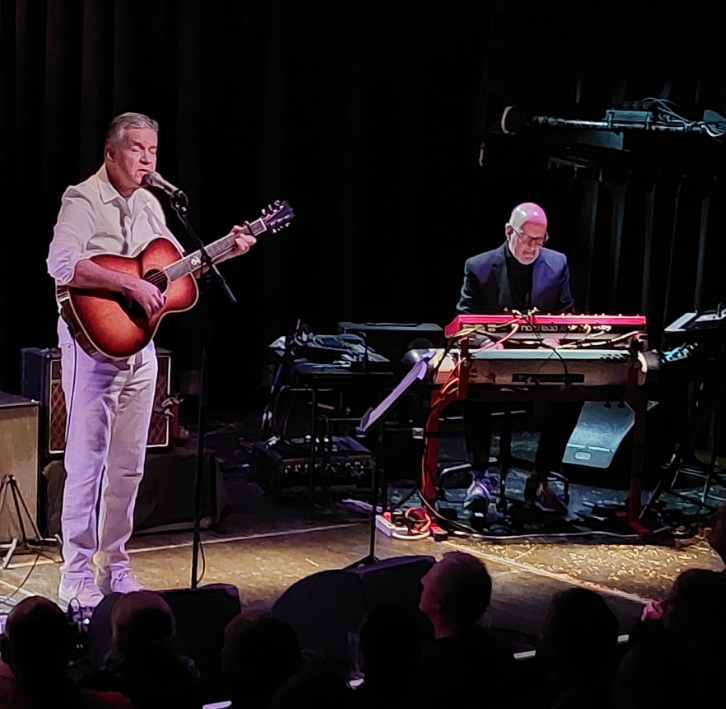
- Blair Cowan with Lloyd Cole in 2023

Background information
- Origin: Scotland
- Genres: Pop; rock; indie pop
- Occupation: Instrumentalist
- Instruments: Piano; keyboards; accordion; melodica
- Formerly of: Lloyd Cole and the Commotions

Blair Cowan is a Scottish musician, formerly a member of Lloyd Cole and the Commotions. Following the breakup of that band, he continued to collaborate with Lloyd Cole early in the singer's solo career, playing and co-writing on 1990's Lloyd Cole and 1991's Don't Get Weird on Me Babe.

He has since performed on other artists' recordings, including Del Amitri, Texas, the Hot Rod Cadets, the Kevin McDermott Orchestra, and Alisdair Robertson. His collaboration with Robertson resulted in the album Confessions of a Justified Singer. He plays piano, keyboards, accordion, and melodica. In the 1990s, Cowan was a member and co-producer of Paul Quinn and the Independent Group on the revived Postcard Records.

In 2007, Cowan played in Kevin McDermott's album, Wise to the Fade.

In 2010, Cowan collaborated on Lloyd Cole's Broken Record, co-writing "Oh Genevieve".

In 2019, Cowan also collaborated on Cole's Guesswork, teaming up with former Commotions bandmate, Neil Clark.
