= Neil Clark (musician) =

Scottish guitarist (born 1958)

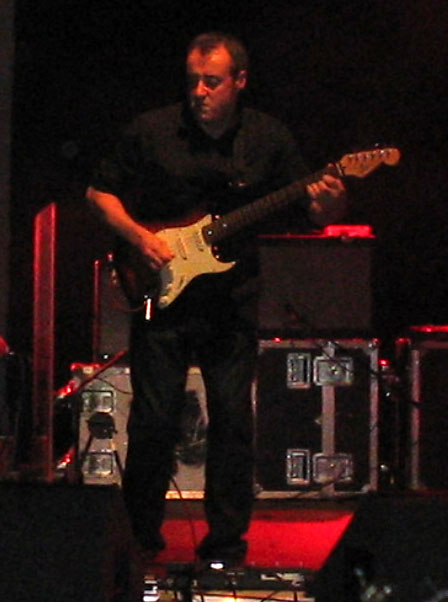
Neil Clark in 2004

Neil Clark (born 3 July 1958, in Hamilton, South Lanarkshire, Scotland) is a Scottish guitarist, known for his work with Lloyd Cole and the Commotions. He has regularly worked and toured with Lloyd Cole post-Commotions including playing on and touring in support of Cole's 2006 album, Antidepressant. He also worked on Cole's albums Bad Vibes, Love Story, Etc, Music in a Foreign Language, and Guesswork. Clark was a member of Bloomsday with Stephen Irvine of the Commotions and Chris Thomson of The Bathers. Clark features on the Bathers' 1993 album, Lagoon Blues. He collaborated with Canadian singer Mae Moore on her album Dragonfly - his guitar playing featured on her single "Genuine", which reached No. 6 on the RPM "Top 100" singles chart in Canada. In 1995 and 1998 he worked on two albums with French singer Axelle Renoir.

Two songs, co-written by Clark for Lloyd Cole and the Commotions, have been covered by other artists: "Rattlesnakes", by Tori Amos and "(Are You) Ready to Be Heartbroken?", by Sandie Shaw.

He lives in Toronto, Ontario, Canada and has released two solo albums, Sundogs in 2008 and Second Story Sunlight in 2010. Both albums mix minimalist and cinematic guitar styles with ambient electronica. He currently also plays and writes with Ambrose Pottie (drums) and Alisdair Jones (bass) in post-jazz trio, Sleepers.

Clark toured the UK, Ireland, France, New-Zealand, Australia with Lloyd Cole in an acoustic concert at multiple venues in October, November and December 2019.
