= FOC =

FOC may refer to:

== Places ==
- Falls of Cruachan railway station, in Scotland
- Fuzhou Changle International Airport, in Fujian, China

== Arts, entertainment, and media ==
=== Gaming ===
- Transformers: Fall of Cybertron, a video game
- Star Wars: Empire at War: Forces of Corruption, an expansion for the game Star Wars: Empire at War

=== Music ===
- FOC (album), by Australian rock group Far Out Corporation
- Far Out Corporation, an Australian band
- Flag of Convenience (band), an English rock band

=== Other arts, entertainment, and media ===
- Flight of the Conchords, a New Zealand comedy duo

== Communications and technology ==
- Faint Object Camera, on the Hubble Space Telescope
- Festival of Code, an annual hackathon
- Fiber-optic cable
- Field-oriented control

== Occupations or roles ==
- Father of the Chapel, a trade union official
- Friend of the court

== Organizations ==
- Federal Office of Culture, in Switzerland
- Finnish Organization of Canada, a cultural organisation
- First Class CW Operators' Club, an Amateur Radio Morse code organisation
- Workers Front of Catalonia (Catalan: Front Obrer de Catalunya)

== Other uses ==
- Foc (Barcelona Metro), a railway station in Barcelona, Spain
- First order condition
- Final Order Cutoff, allowance to increase or/and decrease quantity numbers in orders until print run day
- Flag of convenience (business)
- Flag of convenience
- Focus (linguistics)
- Forward of center (or front of center), a measure of the weight bias of an arrow
- Fractional-order control
- Free of charge
- Freedom of choice
- Full operational capability
- Fundamental Orders of Connecticut, a 1639 political charter of the Connecticut Colony
- Fusarium oxysporum f. sp. cubense or Foc, the pathogen of Panama disease/Fusarium wilt of banana

== See also ==
- FOCS (disambiguation)
