= Quasi-foreign corporation =

A quasi-foreign corporation (also known as a pseudo-foreign corporation) is a corporation incorporated in a jurisdiction with which it has minimal business contacts. Corporations may incorporate in foreign jurisdictions in order to minimize liability, taxes, or regulatory interference.

Offshore corporations are a common example, as are Delaware corporations and Nevada corporations in the United States.

== Legal regimes ==
Generally, the internal affairs doctrine provides that a corporation's internal affairs are governed by the jurisdiction in which it is incorporated. However, many jurisdictions apply local law to foreign corporations in certain determinations such as piercing the corporate veil. Some jurisdictions have gone further in attempting to control the activities of quasi-foreign corporations.

=== California ===
Section 2115 of the California Corporations Code applies many aspects of California corporate law to foreign corporations operating in California under Californian ownership, including many provisions dealing with director liability and shareholder authority. While these rules may apply in suits brought against foreign corporations in California courts, Delaware courts refuse to apply Section 2115 in suits against Delaware corporations.

=== Japan ===
The Japanese corporate statute of 2006 provides that "no foreign company having its main office in Japan or the primary purpose of which is to carry on business in Japan may engage in transactions on a continuous basis in Japan" and that "any person who has engaged in transactions in violation of the provision of the preceding paragraph shall be jointly and severally liable with the foreign company to any counterparty for such transactions."

Before the statute was passed, many banks and other multinational corporations operated in Japan as foreign entities in order to avoid Japanese regulations requiring banking and securities businesses to be separated by Chinese walls. These companies, along with international chambers of commerce and other organizations, extensively lobbied the Japanese government to change the language of the draft bill.

The solution was for the House of Councillors, the upper house of the Diet of Japan, to add a rider to the bill calling for "all efforts... to ensure that existing foreign companies in Japan and future investments that may be made by foreign companies into Japan will not be adversely impacted."
