= Intermission (Robert Forster & Grant McLennan album) =

Compilation album by Robert Forster and Grant McLennan
- Released: 2007
- Recorded: 1990–1997
- Genre: Alternative rock
- Length: 104:19
- Label: Beggars Banquet
- Producer: Robert Forster, Mick Harvey, Edwyn Collins, Dave Dobbyn, John Keane, Wayne Connolly

Professional ratings
Review scores
Source	Rating
Allmusic	4/5 stars
Pitchfork Media	(8.5/10)

Intermission is a two-CD compilation album by Robert Forster and Grant McLennan, bandmates in The Go-Betweens, of material recorded for their solo albums through the 1990s.

Although the album was released after the death of McLennan in May 2006, it had been planned since 2000 and a final track list prepared in April 2006. The album title was chosen by McLennan.

Forster, in a 2007 interview, explained: "Grant and I had always planned to take last year off. Our last album Oceans Apart did so well, Intermission was intended to give new fans something to look into and to tide old fans over. When Grant died, I froze. I didn't know what to do about music. Everyone left me alone to decide in my own time and, at the end of 2006, I felt the best thing to do was to carry on as we'd planned; finish sorting Intermission."

He said the album had always been planned as two separate discs, each presenting their own work: "We enjoyed those years of exploring our songs apart, they helped us grow. They don't sound like The Go-Betweens, and to force them together retrospectively wouldn't be right."

The recordings were re-mastered by Bill Inglot and longtime manager Bob Johnson.

== Track listing ==
=== Robert Forster ===
(All songs written by Robert Forster except where marked)

1. "Falling Star" – 4:05
  - Recorded Brisbane, October 1992. Originally on Calling From a Country Phone
2. "Baby Stones" – 4:06
  - Recorded Berlin, June/July 1990. Originally on Danger in the Past
3. "121" – 3:29
  - Recorded Brisbane, October 1992. Originally on Calling From a Country Phone
4. "I've Been Looking For Somebody" – 4:20
  - Recorded Berlin, June/July 1990. Originally on Danger in the Past
5. "I'll Jump" – 3:02
  - Recorded London, January/February 1996. Originally on Warm Nights
6. "Beyond Their Law" – 5:03
  - Recorded Brisbane, October 1992. Originally on Calling From a Country Phone
7. "I Can Do" – 3:00
  - Recorded London, January/February 1996. Originally on Warm Nights
8. "The Circle" – 3:44
  - Recorded Brisbane, October 1992. Originally on Calling From a Country Phone
9. "Cryin' Love" – 5:26
  - Recorded London, January/February 1996. Originally on Warm Nights
10. "The River People" – 3:26
  - Recorded Berlin, June/July 1990. Originally on Danger in the Past
11. "Frisco Depot" (Mickey Newbury) – 2:38
  - Recorded Melbourne, January 1994. Originally on I Had a New York Girlfriend
12. "Danger in The Past" – 4:51
  - Recorded Berlin, June/July 1990. Originally on Danger in the Past
13. "Falling Star (Original Version)" – 4:04
  - Recorded Berlin, June/July 1990.

=== Grant McLennan ===
(All songs by Grant McLennan)

1. "Haven't I Been A Fool" – 3:23
  - Recorded Sydney, September/October 1990. Originally on Watershed
2. "Easy Come Easy Go" – 4:01
  - Recorded Sydney, September/October 1990. Originally on Watershed
3. "Black Mule" – 4:45
  - Recorded Sydney, September/October 1990. Originally on Watershed
4. "The Dark Side Of Town" – 3:45
  - Recorded Sydney and Melbourne, 1993. Originally on Fireboy
5. "Lighting Fires" – 3:36
  - Recorded Sydney and Melbourne, 1993. Originally on Fireboy
6. "Surround Me" – 3:55
  - Recorded Sydney and Melbourne, 1993. Originally on Fireboy
7. "No Peace In The Palace" – 4:16
  - Recorded Athens, Georgia, 1994. Originally on Horsebreaker Star
8. "Hot Water" – 3:48
  - Recorded Athens, Georgia, 1994. Originally on Horsebreaker Star
9. "I'll Call You Wild" – 4:42
  - Recorded Athens, Georgia, 1994. Originally on Horsebreaker Star
10. "Horsebreaker Star" – 4:15
  - Recorded Athens, Georgia, 1994. Originally on Horsebreaker Star
11. "Malibu 69" – 4:46
  - Recorded Sydney, December 1996/January 1997. Originally on In Your Bright Ray
12. "One Plus One" – 2:59
  - Recorded Sydney, December 1996/January 1997. Originally on In Your Bright Ray
13. "In Your Bright Ray" – 4:57
  - Recorded Sydney, December 1996/January 1997. Originally on In Your Bright Ray
