= Butterfly (Lloyd Cole song) =

1991 song by Lloyd Cole

Single by Lloyd Cole

from the album Don't Get Weird on Me Babe
- Released: 2 March 1992
- Length: 3:05
- Label: Polydor
- Songwriter(s): Lloyd Cole
- Producer(s): Lloyd Cole; Fred Maher; Paul Hardiman

Lloyd Cole singles chronology
"Weeping Wine" (1991)	"Butterfly" (1992)	"So You'd Like to Save the World" (1993)

"Butterfly" is a song by English singer, songwriter and musician Lloyd Cole, released in 1991 as the third and final single from his second studio album, Don't Get Weird on Me Babe. The song was written by Cole, and produced by Cole, Fred Maher and Paul Hardiman. It peaked at number 90 in the UK Singles Chart.

== Background ==
Cole wrote "Butterfly" on the piano. It was the last track on his second studio album Don't Get Weird on Me Babe for which he recorded the vocals. The lyrics for the song were left incomplete until towards the end of the album's recording sessions. In a 1991 interview on the Irish TV show An Eye on the Music, Cole said, "I hadn't written [the lyrics] because there just hadn't been time, I'd been doing something else all the time. We had three days left so I said [to the others in the studio], 'Go do something for a while, leave me in here' and I actually wrote the whole lyric in about half an hour which is quite quick by my standards."

The song's lyrics have been described as "a dark, twisted tale of possession and pain masquerading as love". Cole told the Daily Record in 1992, "It's about a guy who finds this innocent creature and perverts it. It's one of the best songs I've ever written." Speaking of the song in more detail, Cole revealed to the Chicago Tribune in 1991, "The actual sound of 'Butterfly' is pretty aggressive once it gets going. Those chords are not pretty chords. I think it's very nice to juxtapose lyrics like that against a scenario of music which people tend to associate with Barry Manilow. A lot of people heard my orchestral side and thought, 'Oh, he's gone soft.' I think 'Butterfly' [is one] of the hardest things I've ever done."

== Release ==
Cole had originally agreed to Polydor's wishes for "She's a Girl and I'm a Man" to be the lead single from Don't Get Weird on Me Babe on the condition that "There for Her" or another track from the album's "orchestral side" would be the second single. The label ultimately decided to release the more commercial "Weeping Wine" as the second single instead without Cole's input. In early 1992, Polydor decided to release "Butterfly", one of the album's orchestral tracks, as a single and Cole agreed to their request of commissioning someone to remix the track. Polydor chose Adam Peters who, in turn, created a near seven-minute version of the track titled "The Planet Ann Charlotte Mix", which was included on the 12-inch and CD formats of the single.

Cole later recalled of Peters' remix, "I thought what he did with 'Butterfly' was wonderful and completely unexpected – he didn't even keep the piece in the same key. He was thinking outside the box, or at least outside my box." He added to Hearsay Magazine in 2000, "At the time I wanted to go further with being less like myself and what he'd done with something I'd written was far more radical than anything I had done." Cole was so impressed with the remix that he invited Peter to come to New York and work with him. Peters would serve as producer among other roles on Cole's 1993 album Bad Vibes and his 1995 album Love Story.

== Critical reception ==
Upon its release as a single, John Mulvey of NME felt that, on "Butterfly", Cole "practises his hard bastard fantasies while an orchestra swirls and broods behind him" and added that he come across "not half as mean as he hopes, of course, but still effectively sullen". Mulvey felt that Adam Peters' "Planet Ann Charlotte Mix" was "a failure, but a noble one", commenting that he "tries to pull off an 'Unfinished Sympathy'-style coup by adding a techno pulse and a soulful female vocal to all the strings and surly suffering". A reviewer for the Lancashire Evening Telegraph awarded the single an 8 out of 10 rating, calling it "the best from Lloyd in quite some time" and the "perfect vehicle for his undoubted, if irregular, talent". In a review of Don't Get Weird on Me Babe, Jon Wilde of Melody Maker described the song as "preposterously melodramatic". Diana Valois of The Morning Call noted its "strong drum beat" and "Chris Isaak-meets-Marc Almond sense of romantic surrealism".

== Track listing ==
7–inch single (UK and Europe)

1. "Butterfly" – 3:02
2. "Jennifer She Said" (Recorded live at the Hammersmith Odeon, 26 October 1991) – 3:20

12–inch single (UK and Europe)

1. "Butterfly" (The Planet Ann Charlotte Mix) – 6:50
2. "Butterfly" – 3:02
3. "Jennifer She Said" (Live) – 3:20

CD single (UK and Europe)

1. "Butterfly" – 3:02
2. "Jennifer She Said" (Live) – 3:20
3. "Butterfly" (The Planet Ann Charlotte Mix) – 6:50

CD single (France)

1. "Butterfly" – 3:02
2. "Jennifer She Said" (Live) – 3:20

== Personnel ==
Credits are adapted from the Don't Get Weird on Me Babe CD album liner notes and the UK CD single.

"Butterfly"

- Lloyd Cole – vocals, piano, organ, guitar
- Fred Maher – drums
- Bashiri Johnson – percussion

Additional musicians on "The Planet Ann Charlotte Mix"

- Ann Charlotte Vensgaarde – additional vocals

Production

- Lloyd Cole – producer, mixer ("Butterfly")
- Fred Maher – producer, mixer ("Butterfly")
- Paul Hardiman – producer, mixer, engineer ("Butterfly")
- Tim Young – mastering ("Butterfly")
- Adam Peters – remixer ("The Planet Ann Charlotte Mix")
- Pete Dauncey – producer ("Jennifer She Said")
- Chris Sheldon – mixing ("Jennifer She Said")
- Dave Mulkeen – engineer ("Jennifer She Said")

== Charts ==
Chart (1992)	Peak position
UK Singles Chart (OCC)	90
UK Music Week Airplay Top 10 Breakers	4
