= Don't Get Weird on Me Babe =

Studio album by Lloyd Cole
- Released: 1991
- Recorded: Late 1990 – 1991
- Studios: Axis, New York City; Right Track, Manhattan, New York City; Capitol, Hollywood, California
- Genre: Alternative rock
- Label: Polydor
- Producers: Lloyd Cole; Fred Maher; Paul Hardiman

Lloyd Cole chronology
Lloyd Cole (1990)	Don't Get Weird on Me Babe (1991)	Bad Vibes (1993)

Don't Get Weird on Me Babe is the second solo album by the English musician Lloyd Cole, released in 1991. The title comes from a Raymond Carver expression. Unlike the original release, the American version of the album leads with the "rock" half and ends with the orchestral songs.

The album peaked at No. 40 on Billboard's Heatseekers Albums chart. It peaked at No. 21 on the UK Albums Chart. Cole promoted the album by touring with Robert Forster and Grant McLennan.

== Production ==
The album was produced by Cole, Fred Maher, and Paul Hardiman. The string parts were arranged by Paul Buckmaster. Robert Quine, Matthew Sweet, and Maher joined Cole on the "rock" half of the album.

== Critical reception ==
Professional ratings
Review scores
Source	Rating
AllMusic	4.5/5 stars
The Encyclopedia of Popular Music	3/5 stars
Entertainment Weekly	B
NME	8/10
St. Petersburg Times	5/5 stars

Upon its release, Jon Wilde of Melody Maker felt the album provided "reason enough for some kind of modest assessment" of Cole's work, commenting, "Divided between orchestral arrangements and more familiar chastened rockers, it somewhat surprisingly offers some of his sharpest, smartest-writing since Rattlesnakes." He noted that the first side "suggests that Cole might yet venture where Iggy Pop feared to tread after the disintegration of The Stooges" and is characterised by the "lush string arrangements" of Paul Buckmaster. He considered side two to be "more uneven" with a mix of "chunky-knit rockers and picked-clean guitar pop". Stuart Maconie of NME described it as "a great pop record featuring Lloyd's perennial concerns all set to great, big-screen arrangements" and that the "prevalent mood of the record is tousle-haired, whiskey flavoured, a dog-eared Salinger paperback of a thing". He noted that the "terrific" side one "primarily features orchestral tracks and a new-found fascination with the truckstop romanticism of '68 period Jim Webb/Glen Campbell", whereas side two is "a more usual collection of crumpled, glamorous, guitar-driven pop". Maconie also noted Cole's "attractively exasperated voice".

Entertainment Weekly, noting the string arrangements on six of the songs, wrote that "Cole’s no dilettante, and Don’t Get Weird is a strong record ... But Cole should perhaps concentrate on delivering real rock & roll goods over a full album." Trouser Press called Don't Get Weird on Me Babe "a great record," writing that "Cole’s uncomplicated romantic angst [is] made fleshy and devastating by the surrounding lushness of woodwinds, strings, percussion, piano and female backing vocals."

Stereo Review deemed it "one of the most genuinely nervy and idiosyncratic major-label rock albums of the year." Rolling Stone declared: "Lloyd Cole has made a late-Sixties pop album. Think drums with brushes, Hammond B-3 organ, a big string section; think Neil Diamond, Glen Campbell and Sinead [O'Connor]'s pal Frank." The St. Petersburg Times called the album "a masterpiece" and "a breathtaking record full of inspired writing, smooth melodies and eloquent instrumentation."

AllMusic wrote that the album was initially "considered a self-indulgent oddity ... In retrospect, however, it's clearly one of Lloyd Cole's finest works."

== Track listing ==
All tracks composed by Lloyd Cole, except where noted. For the US track listing, the album opens with UK tracks 7–12 (in the exact same order), and concludes with UK tracks 1–6 (again, in the same order).

1. "Butterfly" – 3:02
2. "There for Her" (Lloyd Cole, Blair Cowan) – 4:06
3. "Margo's Waltz" (Lloyd Cole, Blair Cowan) – 4:04
4. "Half of Everything" (Lloyd Cole, Blair Cowan) – 7:04
5. "Man Enough" (Lloyd Cole, Blair Cowan) – 4:03
6. "What He Doesn't Know" (Lloyd Cole, Blair Cowan) – 4:05
7. "Tell Your Sister" – 3:31
8. "Weeping Wine" – 2:38
9. "To the Lions" – 2:41
10. "Pay for It" – 6:21
11. "The One You Never Had" – 2:31
12. "She's a Girl and I'm a Man" (Lloyd Cole, Robert Quine) – 4:17

== Personnel ==
- Lloyd Cole – lead vocals, guitar; bass and percussion on "What He Doesn't Know", harmonica on "There for Her" and "What He Doesn't Know", organ on "Butterfly", piano on "Butterfly" and "Man Enough"
- Robert Quine – guitar on tracks 7–12
- Matthew Sweet – bass, backing vocals
- Blair Cowan – Hammond organ, piano; accordion on "Man Enough", harmonium on "What He Doesn't Know", guitar sampler on "There for Her" and "What He Doesn't Know"
- Fred Maher – drums; guitar on "Half of Everything", percussion on "Tell Your Sister" and "There for Her"
- Bashiri Johnson – percussion
- Jack Johnson – guitar on "Half of Everything"
- Carlos Vega – drums on "There for Her" and "Margo's Waltz"
- Leland Sklar – bass on "There for Her" and "Margo's Waltz"
- Beti – backing vocals on "Margo's Waltz" and "Half of Everything"
- Paul Buckmaster – conductor
- Sid Page – concertmaster
- Suzie Katayama – copyist

Technical

- Paul Hardiman – engineer
- David Schober – orchestral recordings engineer
- Matthew Donaldson – photography

== Charts ==
Chart performance for Don't Get Weird on Me Babe
Chart (1991)	Peak position
Dutch Albums (Album Top 100)	91
European Albums (Eurotipsheet)	39
Portuguese Album Chart	7
Swedish Albums (Sverigetopplistan)	7
UK Albums (Official Charts)	21
