= Baby (Lloyd Cole song) =

1995 single by Lloyd Cole

Single by Lloyd Cole

from the album Love Story
- Released: 29 April 1996
- Length: 3:56
- Label: Fontana
- Songwriter: Lloyd Cole
- Producers: Stephen Street; Adam Peters; Lloyd Cole

Lloyd Cole singles chronology
"Sentimental Fool" (1995)	"Baby" (1996)	"That Boy" (1998)

"Baby" is a song by English singer, songwriter and musician Lloyd Cole, released in 1996 as the third and final single from his fourth studio album Love Story. The song was written by Cole and produced by Stephen Street, Adam Peters and Cole. It peaked at number 99 in the UK Singles Chart and remains his last top 100 entry to date.

== Background ==
Speaking of the song and its limited commercial success, Cole recalled in 2005, "I always thought that was one of the better songs [from Love Story] and when it didn't shake the world I guess I may have lowered my expectations, somewhat." Two versions of the CD single featured a photograph of Cole and his son William on the front sleeve. Cole recalled of the photography session, "It was supposed to be for family use only. The record company were not supposed to use that shot."

== Critical reception ==
Upon its release as a single, Ken Banks of the Press and Journal felt it was a "stirring testament" that "Baby" "remains worth buying" despite being "one of the weaker tracks on Cole's new album". He added that the "quietly enchanting single must surely make its way into the charts even if other tracks on the album actually manage to outshine it". Andrew Hirst of the Huddersfield Daily Examiner wrote, "If your baby won't sleep, a few bars of this lilting lullaby should help."

== Track listing ==
Cassette single (UK and Europe)

1. "Baby" – 3:56
2. "Jennifer She Said" (Lloyd Cole and the Commotions) – 3:05

CD single (UK and Europe #1)

1. "Baby" – 3:56
2. "The Steady Slowing Down of the Heart" – 3:26
3. "Baby" (Original Demo) – 3:54
4. "Live Lovers Do" (Stephen Street Mix) – 3:58

CD single (UK and Europe #2)

1. "Baby" – 3:56
2. "My Bag" (Lloyd Cole and the Commotions) – 4:01
3. "Jennifer She Said" (Lloyd Cole and the Commotions) – 3:05
4. "From the Hip" (Lloyd Cole and the Commotions) – 3:54

CD single (Europe)

1. "Baby" – 3:56
2. "Jennifer She Said" (Lloyd Cole and the Commotions) – 3:05

== Personnel ==
Production

- Stephen Street – producer ("Baby", "Like Lovers Do")
- Adam Peters – producer ("Baby", "Baby" (Original Demo))
- Lloyd Cole – producer ("Baby", "The Steady Slowing Down of the Heart", "Baby" (Original Demo), "Like Lovers Do")
- Ian Stanley – producer ("Jennifer She Said", "My Bag", "From the Hip")
- Mick Glossop – mixing ("Baby", "The Steady Slowing Down of the Heart")

== Charts ==
Chart (1996)	Peak position
UK Singles (Official Charts)	99
