= Lee Remick (disambiguation) =

Lee Remick (1935–1991) was an American film and television actress.

Lee Remick may also refer to:

- "Lee Remick" (song), by Go-Betweens song, 1978
- "Lee Remick" (Hefner song), 1998
