= FOCS (disambiguation) =

FOCS is an abbreviation for the annual IEEE Symposium on Foundations of Computer Science.

It may also refer to:

- Federation of Old Cornwall Societies
- Fiber optic current sensor
- FOCS, a flight scheduling product from Flygprestanda
- Friends of Clayoquot Sound

== See also ==
- FOC (disambiguation), some of whose expansions may be pluralized as FOCs
