= The Predators (Australian band) =

Australian rock band

- Origin: Brisbane, Australia
- Genres: Rock
- Years active: 2005–present
- Label: Dew Process
- Spinoff of: Powderfinger
- Members: Ross McLennan; Steven Bishop; John Collins; Ian Haug

The Predators are an Australian rock band formed in Brisbane in 2005. It comprises three of the original members of the rock group Powderfinger: Steven Bishop, Ian Haug, and John Collins, and Haug's fellow member of Far Out Corporation, Ross McLennan. As of 2023, they have released one EP, Pick Up the Pace (2006), and one full-length album, Everybody Loves (2021).

== History ==
Early in Powderfinger's days, Bishop left the group for personal reasons, while Haug and Collins stayed on. Haug helped form the group Far Out Corporation in 1997, with singer/guitarist Grant McLennan and drummer Ross McLennan.

In 2005, when Powderfinger went on hiatus, Haug and Collins reconnected with Bishop and began writing songs together. They named themselves the Predators and were signed to Dew Process, a label begun by Powderfinger's manager, Paul Piticco. The Predators released their debut EP, Pick Up the Pace, in July 2006.

In late 2006, Powderfinger reunited, and the Predators project was shelved. In 2021, they released a full-length album, titled Everybody Loves.

== Discography ==
- Pick Up the Pace (EP, 2006)
- Everybody Loves (2021)

== Band members ==
- Ian Haug – guitars and backing vocals
- John Collins – bass
- Steven Bishop – vocals, studio drums
- Ross McLennan – live drums
