= International financial management =

International financial management, also known as international finance, is the management of finance in an international business environment; that is, trading and making money through the exchange of foreign currency. The international financial activities help the organizations to connect with international dealings with overseas business partners- customers, suppliers, lenders etc. It is also used by government organization and non-profit institutions.

== History and background ==
During the post-war years, the GATT was established to improve trade. It removed the trade barriers notably over the years, as a result of which international trade grew manifold. The financial participation of the trader's exporters and importers and the international transactions flowed significantly. It started when different countries started "liberalizing" i.e. when countries agreed to open doors for each other and traded. The advancement of technology and liberalization resulted in the idea of financial management both domestically and globally.

== Domestic vs international financial management (IFM) ==
Financial Systems may be classified as domestic or overseas, closed or open. A ‘domestic’ is one inside a country. Thus financial system in the United States, is an international financial system from the India's view. The mean and objective of both domestic and international financial management remains the same but the dimensions and dynamics broaden drastically. Foreign currency, market imperfections, enhanced opportunity sets and political risks are four broader heads under which IFM can be differentiated from financial management (FM). The goal of IFM is not only limited to maximization of shareholders but also stakeholders.

== Importance ==
Compared to national financial markets international markets have a different shape and analytics. Proper management of international finances can help the organization in achieving same efficiency and effectiveness in all markets, hence without IFM sustaining in the market can be difficult.

Companies are motivated to invest capital in abroad for the following reasons

- Efficiently produce products in foreign markets than that domestically.
- Obtain the essential raw materials needed for production.
- Broaden markets and diversify
- Earn higher returns
- foreign investment

== See also ==
- Outline of management
