= Weeping Wine =

1991 song by Lloyd Cole

Single by Lloyd Cole

from the album Don't Get Weird on Me Babe
- Released: 21 October 1991
- Length: 2:38
- Label: Polydor
- Songwriter(s): Lloyd Cole
- Producer(s): Lloyd Cole; Fred Maher; Paul Hardiman

Lloyd Cole singles chronology
"She's a Girl and I'm a Man" (1991)	"Weeping Wine" (1991)	"Butterfly" (1992)

"Weeping Wine" is a song by English singer, songwriter and musician Lloyd Cole, released in 1991 as the second single from his second studio album Don't Get Weird on Me Babe. The song was written by Cole, and produced by Cole, Fred Maher and Paul Hardiman. It reached number 91 in the UK Singles Chart.

== Release ==
Cole originally agreed to Polydor's wishes for "She's a Girl and I'm a Man" to be the lead single from Don't Get Weird on Me Babe on the condition that "There for Her" or another track from the album's "orchestral side" would be the second single. After "She's a Girl and I'm a Man" failed to meet the label's expectations, Cole was scheduled to appear on Wogan to perform the follow-up single. The label ultimately decided to release the more commercial "Weeping Wine" as the second single instead of an orchestral one without Cole's input. He told Hearsay Magazine in 2000, "It was quite strange because when 'She's a Girl and I'm a Man' wasn't a hit there was no Plan B and I'd been booked to do the Wogan show. Polydor told me that Wogan wouldn't have me on if I played an orchestral song, so they pressed up 'Weeping Wine' as the second single without telling me."

"Weeping Wine" failed to reach the top 75 in the UK Singles Chart and reached its peak of number 91 in its first week on 2 November 1991. In Europe, the single gained enough adds on radio playlists for it to be listed by Music & Media as one of the "European Hit Radio New Add Leaders" on 9 November 1991. In the US, "Weeping Wine" was released as a promotional single by Capitol in January 1992. It reached number 30 in The Hard Report Focus 50 Adult Alternative Airplay chart on 21 February.

== Promotion ==
A music video was filmed to promote the single. Cole also appeared and performed the song on the British TV show Wogan which was broadcast on 21 October 1991.

== Critical reception ==
Upon its release as a single, Billy Bragg, as guest reviewer for NME, commented, "This is alright. It sounds nice. Lloyd is obviously trying to crack the US mass market so he's made a classic radio single. It'll probably do well." The Accrington Observer awarded the single a three out of five star rating. The reviewer believed it was "destined for the outer reaches of the charts" and added, "Without the Commotions, Lloyd is actually producing some of his best stuff to date as he toys with catchy choruses and twangy guitars. The fans will love it."

Paul Lester of Melody Maker described Cole as "the most ludicrously, laughably overrated songwriter of his generation" and noted how his previous work was "all Lou Reed made simple". He continued, "'Weeping Wine' sets Lloyd up quite nicely for his next career move, as the late Roy Orbison's understudy in the Traveling Wilburys. Bring on the chortling alsatians!" The Rhondda Leader was negative in their review, stating that it "sounds just like every bland 60s, 70s or 80s MOR track you've ever heard". They added, "Lloyd is in trouble. Any singer with a record advertised 'as seen on Wogan' needs help, but this [single] is not the lifeline he needs."

== Track listing ==
7–inch and cassette single (UK and Europe)

1. "Weeping Wine" – 2:38
2. "The 'L' Word (Tell Your Sister)" – 3:20

12–inch and CD single (UK and Europe) and CD single (Australia)

1. "Weeping Wine" – 2:38
2. "The 'L' Word (Tell Your Sister)" – 3:20
3. "Somewhere Out in the East" – 2:18

12–inch and CD promotional single (US)

1. "Weeping Wine" – 2:38
2. "The 'L' Word" ("Tell Your Sister" Demo) – 3:20
3. "Somewhere Out in the East" (Instrumental) – 2:18

== Personnel ==
Credits are adapted from the Don't Get Weird on Me Babe CD album liner notes and the UK CD single.

"Weeping Wine"

- Lloyd Cole – vocals, guitar
- Robert Quine – guitar
- Matthew Sweet – bass, backing vocals
- Fred Maher – drums

Production

- Lloyd Cole – producer ("Weeping Wine", "The 'L' Word", "Somewhere Out in the East")
- Fred Maher – producer ("Weeping Wine")
- Paul Hardiman – producer ("Weeping Wine"), engineer ("Weeping Wine")
- Tim Young – mastering ("Weeping Wine")

Other

- Matthew Donaldson – photography

== Charts ==
Chart (1991)	Peak position
UK Singles Chart (OCC)	91
