= In Your Bright Ray =

Studio album by Grant McLennan
- Released: 23 September 1997
- Recorded: Paradise, Sydney, December 1996
- Genre: Alternative rock
- Length: 50:06
- Labels: Cortex, Beggars Banquet
- Producer: Wayne Connolly

Grant McLennan chronology
Horsebreaker Star (1994)	In Your Bright Ray (1997)	Intermission (2007)

In Your Bright Ray is the fourth and final solo album, released in 1997, by Grant McLennan.

The album features Brett Myers of Died Pretty and Wayne Connolly of Knievel on guitars, Maurice Argiro of Underground Lovers on bass, and Tim Powles of The Church on drums.

== Critical reception ==
Professional ratings
Review scores
Source	Rating
AllMusic	4/5 stars
Robert Christgau	(neither)
The Encyclopedia of Popular Music	4/5 stars
Entertainment Weekly	B+
MusicHound Rock: The Essential Album Guide	4/5 stars
NME	6/10

AllMusic wrote: "With a top-notch backing group teasing all the little subtleties that a fan of crafted, gilded, lovely pop could want and McLennan's increasingly wizened, becalmed vocals, the mix of sounds and McLennan's marvelously well-developed material radiates, sparkles, and snaps, crackles, and pops with all his strengths and then some." Trouser Press called the album "pleasant and expertly executed," writing that it "offers little in the way of standouts." CMJ New Music Monthly called the album "McLennan's least immediate offering," writing that "whatever additional concentration is required to appreciate its charms is amply rewarded with a deepened appreciation of his artistry."

== Track listing ==
All words and music by Grant McLennan.

1. "In Your Bright Ray" – 4:59
2. "Cave In" – 3:34
3. "One Plus One" – 2:59
4. "Sea Breeze" – 3:49
5. "Malibu 69" – 4:46
6. "Who Said Love Was Dead" – 3:02
7. "Room for Skin" – 3:11
8. "All Them Pretty Angels"– 3:32
9. "Comet Scar" – 3:38
10. "Down Here" – 5:06
11. "Lamp By Lamp" – 3:11
12. "Do You See the Lights?" – 4:54
13. "The Parade of Shadows" – 3:25

== Personnel ==
- Grant McLennan – guitar, vocals
- Brett Myers – guitar, vocals
- Wayne Connolly – guitar, organ, vocals
- Maurice Argiro – bass
- Tim Powles – drums
