= Downtown (Lloyd Cole song) =

1990 song by Lloyd Cole

Single by Lloyd Cole

from the album Lloyd Cole
- Released: 15 October 1990
- Length: 5:20 (album version); 4:15 (single version)
- Label: Polydor; Capitol (US)
- Songwriter(s): Lloyd Cole; Blair Cowan
- Producer(s): Lloyd Cole; Fred Maher; Paul Hardiman

Lloyd Cole singles chronology
"Don't Look Back" (1990)	"Downtown" (1990)	"She's a Girl and I'm a Man" (1991)

Music video
- "Downtown" on YouTube

"Downtown" is a song by English singer, songwriter and musician Lloyd Cole, released in 1990 as the third and final single from his self-titled studio album. The song was written by Cole and Blair Cowan, and produced by Cole, Fred Maher and Paul Hardiman. It failed to enter the UK Singles Chart but reached number 5 on the US Billboard Modern Rock Tracks chart. The song was included in the soundtrack of the 1990 American psychological thriller film Bad Influence.

== Music video ==
The song's music video achieved medium rotation on MTV.

== Critical reception ==
Upon its release as a single, Andrew Collins of NME described "Downtown" as "a grateful, sublimely-paced evening song" which "enjoys a harmonica as jam-hot" as the one played on David Bowie's 1977 track "A New Career in a New Town". He praised the decision to release the song as a single, noting that "as someone at Polydor has finally spotted", it is "the premier track on Lloyd's accomplished and surprisingly unpretentious solo LP". Selina Webb of Music Week commented that the "warm and touching" song is "classic Cole", "although never quite delivering the full melancholy promised by the intro". She believed the song would "tempt back any stray fans lost when the Commotions split".

Steve Stewart of the Press and Journal awarded the single five out of five stars and described it as a "wonderfully moody cut, with the cool Cole casual vocal". Everett True of Melody Maker was critical of the song, stating, "You suspect he thinks he's making 'art' here. You suspect he thinks he's making something of worth here – and that's why everything's so polite, so mannered, so fucking boring."

== Track listing ==
7–inch and cassette single (UK and Europe)

1. "Downtown" – 4:15
2. "A Long Way Down" (Recorded live in Los Angeles) – 3:50

12–inch single (UK) and CD single (UK and Europe)

1. "Downtown" – 4:15
2. "A Long Way Down" (Recorded live in Los Angeles) – 3:50
3. "Sweetheart" (Recorded live in Los Angeles) – 4:45

12–inch limited edition and numbered single (UK)

1. "Downtown" – 4:15
2. "A Long Way Down" (Recorded live in Los Angeles) – 3:50
3. "Rattlesnakes" (Recorded live in Los Angeles) – 3:43

12-inch promotional and CD promotional single (US)

1. "Downtown" (Edit) – 4:15
2. "Downtown" (LP Version) – 5:20

== Personnel ==
Credits are adapted from the Lloyd Cole CD album liner notes and the UK CD single.

"Downtown"

- Lloyd Cole – vocals, guitars, piano, harmonica
- Blair Cowan – Hammond organ, synthesisers
- Matthew Sweet – bass
- Fred Maher – drums
- Dorathea Strauchen – backing vocals

Production

- Lloyd Cole – producer, mixing (live tracks)
- Fred Maher – producer
- Paul Hardiman – producer
- John Herman – additional engineering ("Downtown")
- Tim Young – mastering ("Downtown")
- Jim Rondinelli – mixing (live tracks)

Other

- Anders Thessing – photography
- Michael Nash Associates – design

== Charts ==
Chart (1990)	Peak position
US Billboard Modern Rock Tracks	5
