= So You'd Like to Save the World =

1993 single by Lloyd Cole

Single by Lloyd Cole

from the album Bad Vibes
- B-side: "For the Pleasure of Your Company"
- Released: 13 September 1993
- Length: 3:33
- Label: Fontana
- Songwriter: Lloyd Cole
- Producer: Adam Peters

Lloyd Cole singles chronology
"Butterfly" (1992)	"So You'd Like to Save the World" (1993)	"Morning Is Broken" (1993)

"So You'd Like to Save the World" is a song by English singer, songwriter and musician Lloyd Cole, released in 1993 as the lead single from his third studio album Bad Vibes. The song was written by Cole and produced by Adam Peters. It peaked at number 72 in the UK Singles Chart and remained in the top 75 for two weeks.

== Background ==
Like the rest of the Bad Vibes album, "So You'd Like to Save the World" was recorded in Cole's home studio in New York. Speaking of the song's message, which takes a swipe at po-faced environmentalists, Cole told the Daily Record in 1993, "I'm having a gentle go at people like Sting and Peter Gabriel. Both of these guys have a sense of humour, so why don't they use it more? If you believe in helping the environment, it doesn't mean you can't make fun of it, too. The song is very self-mocking. I recycle products as much as the next guy, and I'm all for these environmental issues. If people take my song too literally, I don't care. I'm sick of worrying what people make of my lyrics."

== Critical reception ==
Upon its release, Stuart Bailie of NME commented, "Sounds a bit like '70s Lennon, which is handy, since Lloyd has already done the pastiche of Lou and Dylan and we need a change. Still, you feel cheerful, because there are jokey lines about star signs and eco freaks and his mates all clap fondly at the end." Peter Kinghorn of the Newcastle Evening Chronicle noted that "despite the plodding beat it bubbles along nice and brightly". Taylor Parkes of Melody Maker commented on how he felt Cole's career had been on a continuous downward spiral since Lloyd Cole and the Commotions' 1984 debut album Rattlesnakes, on which Cole had the lyrical ability to "pump out rough nuggets of eloquent, pretend-bohemian beauty". Parkes continued, "By the second album, it was shrinking fast, carried on shrinking... shrinking... Until finally: 'So You'd Like to Save the World'. Piss off, Lloyd."

== Track listing ==
7–inch single (UK and Europe) and CD single (Australia)

1. "So You'd Like to Save the World" – 3:33
2. "For the Pleasure of Your Company" – 3:41

CD single (UK and Europe)

1. "So You'd Like to Save the World" – 3:33
2. "For the Pleasure of Your Company" – 3:41
3. "4 M.B." – 4:46

Limited edition CD single (UK and Europe)

1. "So You'd Like to Save the World" – 3:33
2. "Vicious" – 3:51
3. "Mystic Lady" – 3:03

== Personnel ==
Production

- Adam Peters – producer (all tracks)
- Bob Clearmountain – mixing ("So You'd Like to Save the World")
- Lloyd Puckitt – mixing ("For the Pleasure of Your Company")

Other

- David Sims – photography

== Charts ==
Chart (1993)	Peak position
UK Singles (Official Charts)	72
