= No Blue Skies =

1990 song by Lloyd Cole

Single by Lloyd Cole

from the album Lloyd Cole
- Released: 22 January 1990
- Length: 4:11
- Label: Polydor; Capitol (US)
- Songwriter: Lloyd Cole
- Producers: Lloyd Cole; Fred Maher; Paul Hardiman

Lloyd Cole singles chronology
"No Blue Skies" (1990)	"Don't Look Back" (1990)

Music video
- "No Blue Skies" on YouTube

"No Blue Skies" is the debut solo single by English singer, songwriter and musician Lloyd Cole, released in 1990 from his self-titled studio album. The song was written by Cole and produced by Cole, Fred Maher and Paul Hardiman. It peaked at number 42 in the UK Singles Chart and remained in the top 100 for four weeks. Cole has described "No Blue Skies" as "very simple" and a "girl leaves boy or boy leave girl" song.

== Background ==
"No Blue Skies" was the last track to be written and recorded for the album, after Polydor told Cole that they felt the album lacked a song strong enough for release as the lead single. Cole went off and demoed two new songs, but these were immediately rejected by Polydor. He then wrote most of "No Blue Skies" in a very short space of time and guitarist Robert Quine, when he first heard the track, came up with the lead guitar hook. Cole was so pleased with the song that he arranged for it to be recorded immediately. He recalled in 2009, "I was so sure that it was the one that, without demoing it, I reassembled the album production team to record immediately." The song was recorded at Skyline Studios in New York City as Right Track Studios in Manhattan, where the rest of the album was recorded, was unavailable.

Although Cole had yet to finish writing the song, namely a third verse, the backing track was recorded with him providing a rough guide vocal to help guide the musicians, a performance which he would later consider to be his "best vocal take". Cole intended to re-record the vocals after he completed writing the song, but the musicians who played on the track told him that any change to the song's arrangement and an attempt to re-record the vocals would not better what was already completed. Cole initially "insisted that I could do better and that the song would benefit" and so wrote lyrics for the third verse and polished those in the middle eight section. While more keyboards and backing vocals were subsequently added to the track, Cole's attempt to re-record his vocals proved to be in vain and the original take was left. He later recalled, "I don't recall how long it took for me to come around to their way of thinking but it did eventually happen. That one vocal take, not meaning to be anything other than a guide, was the one, and I couldn't better it. There was something going on during the original recording... whatever the voodoo was, we couldn't recreate it."

"No Blue Skies" was Cole's debut single as a solo artist, following the split of Lloyd Cole and the Commotions in 1989. Although Quine felt the original mix at Skyline was superior, the "more polished" mix produced at Maison Rouge in London was the one to be released as a single and on the album. The original mix was included on Cole's 2009 compilation Cleaning Out the Ashtrays (Collected B-Sides & Rarities 1989-2006).

== Music video ==
The song's music video was shot in Los Angeles in December 1989. It was directed by Neil Abramson.

== Critical reception ==
Upon its release as a single, Roger Morton of NME considered "No Blue Skies" to be "an expanded, sultry version of old Cole" and added that it "has a swaying grandeur to it in a U2-meets-Roy Orbison sort of way". Music & Media praised it as "a very strong return" and predicted it would be "a huge hit". They wrote, "The melody of this song is simply superb, which, combined with Cole's measured delivery, makes the chorus a killer."

David Giles of Music Week considered it a "pleasant if unexciting return" for Lloyd. He noted the "nice chugging guitars, everything held back, [and] quite interesting lyrics", but added that "you can't help feeling that the Commotions gave him that little extra bite". Iestyn George of Record Mirror commented, "Lloyd, embarking on a solo career, remains a bastion of reliability. Many fear that he has turned down a creative cul de sac, rehashing old ideas and familiar melodies. As for me, I'm just as happy he's still around." Everett True of Melody Maker was critical of the song, describing it as "languid, hrumph, 'adult' rock".

== Track listing ==
7–inch single (UK, Europe and Australia) and cassette single (UK)

1. "No Blue Skies" – 4:11
2. "Shelly I Do" – 2:58

12–inch and CD single (UK and Europe)

1. "No Blue Skies" – 4:11
2. "Shelly I Do" – 2:58
3. "Wild Orphan" – 3:49

10–inch limited edition and numbered single (UK and Europe) and 12-inch limited edition and numbered single (UK)

1. "No Blue Skies" – 4:11
2. "Shelly I Do" – 2:58
3. "Wild Orphan" – 3:49

CD single (US) and 12-inch promotional single (US)

1. "No Blue Skies" – 4:09
2. "Blame Mary Jane" – 3:48
3. "Witching Hour" – 3:53

CD promotional single (US)

1. "No Blue Skies" – 4:09

== Personnel ==
Credits are adapted from the Lloyd Cole CD album liner notes and the UK and US CD singles.

"No Blue Skies"

- Lloyd Cole – vocals, guitar
- Robert Quine – guitar
- Matthew Sweet – guitar, bass, backing vocals
- Blair Cowan – synthesisers
- Fred Maher – drums
- Nicky Holland – backing vocals

Production

- Lloyd Cole – producer (all tracks)
- Fred Maher – producer ("No Blue Skies", "Wild Orphan", "Blame Mary Jane" and "Witching Hour")
- Paul Hardiman – producer ("No Blue Skies", "Wild Orphan", "Blame Mary Jane" and "Witching Hour"), engineer ("No Blue Skies")
- Blair Cowan – producer ("Shelly I Do")
- John Herman – additional engineering ("No Blue Skies")
- Tim Young – mastering ("No Blue Skies")

Other

- Kevin Westenberg – photography
- Michael Nash Associates – design

== Charts ==
Weekly chart performance for "No Blue Skies"
Chart (1990)	Peak position
Australia (ARIA)	86
Italy Airplay (Music & Media)	10
UK Singles (Official Charts)	42
