= Foreign corporation =

Type of corporation in the United States

Foreign corporation is a term used in the United States to describe an existing corporation (or other type of corporate entity, such as a limited liability company or LLC) that conducts business in a state or jurisdiction other than where it was originally incorporated. The term applies both to domestic corporations that are incorporated in another state and to corporations that are incorporated in a nation other than the United States (known as "alien corporations"). All states require that foreign corporations register with the state before conducting business in the state.

For U.S. federal tax purposes, where "foreign corporation" means a corporation that is not created or organized in the United States. For tax purposes, the Internal Revenue Service (IRS) treats all domestic companies in the same manner for tax purposes, without regard to where they were originally formed or organized within the United States, but applies different rules to companies that are formed or organized outside of the US.

== Registration requirements ==
States need to know who is conducting business in the state for public safety and interest, tax and other considerations. Consequently, all states require companies "transacting business" within their borders to register with the state. Such a registration is called a "foreign registration," and such a company becomes a "foreign corporation" within such a state.

What it means to be "transacting business" varies from state to state, according to each state's specific rules and regulations. For example, California may require corporations to register based upon the compensation it pays to residents of the state, even if its revenues are generated outside of the state.

== Alternatives ==
The two basic ways to organize a corporation that operates in multiple jurisdictions are

- to operate as a single corporation having one jurisdiction to which it is a domestic corporation and register as a foreign corporation in all other states, or
- to create one primary corporation (or parent corporation) that owns the stock of all the other corporations, and each of the other corporations is registered as a domestic corporation in each state it operates. The parent corporation (or parent company) is usually referred to as a holding company, while the separate corporations are referred to as subsidiaries. If the parent corporation owns all of their stock, they would be referred to as wholly owned subsidiaries of the parent company.

=== Holding companies ===
Operating a corporation as a holding company and separate corporations in each state, or operating as a single corporation with registrations as foreign corporations in all the other states than its home state, is a matter of choice for the corporation's directors and officers depending on how it operates, damage liability and tax consequences. A corporation may find it more advantageous operating as separate companies in each state or jurisdiction, or it may find that operating as a single organization may make more sense.

One reason for operating as a single corporation having foreign corporation status in other states is because of corporate governance rules which dictate that the rules of the state where the corporation is a domestic corporation apply for certain provisions such as voting rights, officer and director protection, and liability for misconduct. If a corporation is sued and is considered to have operated in a fraudulent manner such as essentially acting as the alter ego of the stockholders (especially in the case of a corporation having only one stockholder) the corporation's existence may be disregarded by the court. This is referred to as piercing the corporate veil, and is subject to the rules of the home state where the corporation is a domestic corporation. In the case of corporations domesticated in Nevada, for example, as of 2007, over the last twenty years, only twice has the corporate veil been pierced, and in both cases the corporation's owners engaged in fraud.

One reason for operating as a holding company with separate domestic corporations is because of potential liability issues such as in operating facilities which have high potential liabilities in the event of accident or failure. Thus only the assets of the particular corporation in the particular state are at risk in the event of a lawsuit, as opposed to the assets of the entire corporate entity. In some cases, because of ownership rules, the laws of a jurisdiction may require separate businesses to be operated by subsidiaries in order to protect the business of the subsidiary from the operations of the parent. This is most prevalent in the case of subsidiaries which are banks or public utilities such as electric power companies.

=== Federally chartered corporations ===
Except for corporations chartered by act of Congress, the United States does not have federally chartered corporations. A corporation that chartered in Washington, D.C. is not federally chartered and for legal purposes is treated in the same manner as a domestic business corporation that was incorporated in any of the fifty states.

A bank may be eligible for a federal charter, but a federally chartered bank is still incorporated in a specific state.

== Jurisdictional issues ==
Many public corporations in the United States are registered in the State of Delaware (because of more favorable corporate governance regulations), or registered in Nevada (because of more favorable tax provisions and corporate officer liability protection) and then are registered as foreign corporations in all the other states that they do business in. Thus the corporation is a domestic corporation in Delaware or Nevada, and is a foreign corporation in any other state (or country) with which it registers.

While there may be tax benefits as a result of choosing where a corporation's domestic jurisdiction is located, registering as a foreign corporation in another state can create new tax liabilities. For example, Nevada, Texas and Wyoming have no state income tax. While Delaware does not have income tax, it does have a substantial corporate privilege tax. If the company is taxed as a pass-through entity, it may be required to file a partnership return in the state (or states) that it has filed a foreign corporation. If the company is taxed as a C-Corporation, then it may have to pay income taxes to the state (or states) it has filed a foreign corporation, in proportion to the income generated in each state. US Tax Law is complicated all by itself, and adding foreign registrations to an existing company adds to the complication.

== International equivalent ==
Most countries require corporations incorporated elsewhere that establish a branch or place of business in their territory to register with the host country government. In the United Kingdom, and many jurisdictions which derive their company law from English law, such companies are known as "overseas companies".

== See also ==
- Flag of convenience (business)
