= Ross McLennan (drummer) =

Australian drummer

- Birth name: Ross McLennan
- Origin: Brisbane, Queensland, Australia
- Genres: Indie rock Alternative rock
- Instrument: Drums
- Years active: 1996 (Turtlebox), 1998–2000 (Far Out Corporation), 2005 – present (The Predators)
- Labels: Dew Process; Polydor

Ross McLennan is an Australian drummer, best known as a member of Australian rock band The Predators. Prior to performing for The Predators, McLennan also drummed for Far Out Corporation, a rock band led by Grant McLennan (no relation). He also drummed for Brisbane four piece group Turtlebox from 1995 until 1996.

McLennan's first release was an EP entitled UFO Jesus Returns, recorded with the band Turtlebox in 1996. The band had released their debut EP Shameless Pop Songs prior to McLennan joining the group. He subsequently released an album with Far Out Corporation - FOC in 1998, and also released an EP with The Predators, entitled Pick Up the Pace in 2006.

McLennan currently plays guitar for the Minnesota Triplets, a Husker Du tribute band and drums in Brisbane band Union Radio.

== Musical style ==
McLennan drums for The Predators only during live performances, as all recorded drumming is performed by Steven Bishop, who is also the group's singer. McLennan's style is influenced mainly by alternative and classical rock drummers, such as Dave Grohl, John Bonham, Charlie Watts, and Ringo Starr. The Predators' debut EP, Pick Up the Pace, has also drawn comparisons to the likes of David Bowie, especially when performed at live concerts such as Splendour in the Grass.

== Discography ==
Turtlebox

- 1996: UFO Jesus Returns (EP)

Far Out Corporation

- 1998: FOC (Album)

The Predators

- 2006: Pick Up the Pace (EP)

== See also ==
- Far Out Corporation
- The Predators
- Grant McLennan
