= Pick Up the Pace =

2006 EP by the Predators

EP by The Predators
- Released: (Australia) 1 July 2006
- Recorded: Airlock Studios, Brisbane
- Genre: Alternative rock
- Length: 26:58
- Label: Dew Process/Universal Music Australia
- Producer: The Predators

Pick Up the Pace is the debut EP by Australian alternative rock band The Predators. It was released on 1 July 2006 through Dew Process and Universal Music Australia. The EP was produced after Powderfinger entered a hiatus, and several of its band members sought work with side projects. Following the release of Pick Up the Pace, The Predators embarked on a minor tour around Australia, including a performance at Splendour in the Grass, before officially going on hiatus, around the time Powderfinger reformed.

== History ==
The Predators consist of the three original Powderfinger members; Ian Haug (guitar), John Collins (bass), and Steven Bishop (drums, vocals), and thus Pick Up the Pace was influenced by the band's early work. As the three had attended school together, the music on the EP flowed easily. According to Haug, the trio had been discussing the possibility of reuniting for a long time. Ross McLennan, the fourth Predators member, only played drums on live appearances, to allow Bishop to focus on singing. The EP was recorded at Haug's Airlock Studios in the band's home town, Brisbane, with songs first released to radio on 17 May 2006.

In a 2006 interview, John Collins said that the group's formation and the recording of the EP was just "for fun", with no intention of "taking it too seriously". He also noted that the idea of the EP was first proposed when Powderfinger's hiatus began, and he asked Bishop the question "Do you want to write some songs and just have a bit of fun?" Originally, the band had not intended to release any work, stating "It’s not very commercial, in a sense." However, in a later interview with FasterLouder, Bishop noted that the band would "maybe send it off to Europe and The States with some indie labels", as well as hoping to tour around the country.

The EP, and most of the songs on it, were influenced by musical greats such as Pink Floyd, David Bowie and the entire indie rock genre. It was noted that the EP contained "roaring guitar riffs and big choruses". Haug noted in an interview that the original group of songs recorded "lacked vibe", and so the band chose less perfected songs "to ensure that the attitude of the recording was good".

Following the release of Pick Up the Pace, The Predators embarked on a minor tour before performing at Splendour in the Grass. The tour saw them performing along the east coast of Australia. Four concerts were performed, in Sydney, Melbourne, Brisbane, and at Splendour in the Grass, near Byron Bay.

== Music video ==
"Pick Up the Pace"
A 21 second sample from "Pick Up the Pace", the lead track on the EP. This sample includes the song's first chorus.

A music video for "Pick Up the Pace", the lead song on the EP, was recorded in a Brisbane music venue, and released in May 2006. It featured lead singer Steven Bishop "day dreaming of days gone by". The video was distributed by Dew Process.

== Track listing ==
All music written and performed by The Predators.

1. "Pick Up the Pace" – 2:46
2. "Paintings" – 4:29
3. "My Line" – 4:20
4. "Precious Moments" – 5:25
5. "High And Low" – 4:36
6. "Still My Friend" – 5:22
