= Morning Is Broken =

1993 single by Lloyd Cole

Single by Lloyd Cole

from the album Bad Vibes
- B-side: "Radio City Music Hall"
- Released: 8 November 1993 (UK); May 1994 (US)
- Length: 5:20; 3:55 (edit)
- Label: Fontana; Rykodisc (US)
- Songwriter: Lloyd Cole
- Producer: Adam Peters

Lloyd Cole singles chronology
"So You'd Like to Save the World" (1993)	"Morning Is Broken" (1993)	"Like Lovers Do" (1995)

Music video
- "Morning Is Broken" on YouTube

"Morning Is Broken" is a song by English singer, songwriter and musician Lloyd Cole, released in 1993 as the second and final single from his third studio album Bad Vibes. The song was written by Cole and produced by Adam Peters. It reached number 83 in the UK Singles Chart and remained in the top 100 for two weeks.

== Background ==
"Morning Is Broken" originated as the track "Sleeper", which was named after a patch used on it from a Sequential Prophet VS synthesiser. The song was then recorded properly, including John Valentine Carruthers on guitar and Anton Fier on drums, and a mix of the track was completed. As Cole was later unhappy with the song's structure, he reworked its arrangement and had backing vocals added. The song's original mix remained unreleased until it appeared on Cole's 2009 compilation Cleaning Out the Ashtrays (Collected B-Sides & Rarities 1989-2006).

Speaking of the song's lyrics in 2005, Cole said, "I still quite like the lyric and it is, I hope, on the right side of the Bad Vibes fence. Who inspired it? More than one person, but the main one I cannot name."

== Release ==
In the UK and Europe, Fontana released "Morning Is Broken" as the second and final single from Bad Vibes on 8 November 1993. In 1994, the song was released in the US as a CD-5 extended play by Rykodisc. It was one of the nominations at the National Association of Independent Record Distributors and Manufacturers' 1994 Indie Awards under the 'Pop music' category.

== Critical reception ==
Upon its release as a single, Jane Downing of the Sunday Sun gave "Morning Is Broken" a 9 out of 10 rating and commented, "Lloyd hasn't had much luck with singles lately, but this is not a bad little number and will probably end up in the charts." Graham Dunbar of The Northern Echo remarked, "Very mature with a U2-esque thumping guitar but Lloyd has lost his sense of humour and direction." In a review of Bad Vibes, Andrew Collins of Select described it as "an unruly, strutting late-nite rocker with drums like a good kicking and guitars that fume".

== Track listing ==
7–inch single (UK and Europe)

1. "Morning Is Broken" – 5:20
2. "Radio City Music Hall" – 2:46

CD single (UK and Europe)

1. "Morning Is Broken" – 5:20
2. "Radio City Music Hall" – 2:46
3. "Eat Your Greens" – 4:01

CD single, limited edition (UK and Europe)

1. "Morning Is Broken" – 5:20
2. "The Slider" – 3:18
3. "Mannish Girl" – 4:16

CD extended play (US)

1. "Morning Is Broken" (Edit) – 3:55
2. "My Way to You" – 4:20
3. "The Slider" – 3:18
4. "Vicious" – 3:53
5. "Mystic Lady" – 3:04

== Personnel ==
Production

- Adam Peters – producer (all tracks except "Mannish Girl")
- Lloyd Cole – producer ("Mannish Girl")
- Bob Clearmountain – mixing ("Morning Is Broken", "Radio City Music Hall", "My Way to You")

Other

- David Sims – photography

== Charts ==
Chart (1993)	Peak position
UK Singles Chart	83
