= Sentimental Fool =

1995 single by Lloyd Cole

Single by Lloyd Cole

from the album Love Story
- Released: 13 November 1995
- Length: 3:25
- Label: Fontana; Rykodisc (US)
- Songwriter: Lloyd Cole
- Producer: Stephen Street

Lloyd Cole singles chronology
"Like Lovers Do" (1995)	"Sentimental Fool" (1995)	"Baby" (1996)

"Sentimental Fool" is a song by English singer, songwriter and musician Lloyd Cole, released in 1995 as the second single from his fourth studio album Love Story. The song was written by Cole and produced by Stephen Street. It peaked at number 73 in the UK Singles Chart and remained in the top 75 for two weeks.

== Background ==
Speaking to The Mouth Magazine in 2016, Cole said of the song's arrangement, "The arrangement is traditional and quite dull. It could have been more inventive."

== Critical reception ==
Upon its release as a single, Music & Media stated that "languid melodies and lost loves form the basis" of "Sentimental Fool". The reviewer added that "acoustic guitars and a modest organ are soon joined by crescendo violins to accentuate Cole's bad luck in romance". The Guardian were less enthusiastic, writing, "Anybody worried about society's 'dumbing down' should listen to Cole's latest jingle-jangle whine. About 10 years ago, this guy epitomised the coolest kind of songwriterly intellectualism. 'Sentimental Fool' smells of libraries just like the rest of his stuff, except that today his attempts scintillating wordplay sound suspiciously like stupidity." In the US, Larry Flick of Billboard commented that Cole "evokes romantic emotions and pleasant harmonies on this ballad".

== Track listing ==
Cassette single (UK and Europe)

1. "Sentimental Fool" – 3:25
2. "Brand New Friend" (Lloyd Cole and the Commotions) – 4:52

CD single (UK and Europe #1)

1. "Sentimental Fool" – 3:25
2. "Most of the Time" – 4:06
3. "Millionaire" – 3:04
4. "Sold" – 3:55

CD single (UK and Europe #2)

1. "Sentimental Fool" – 3:25
2. "Brand New Friend" (Lloyd Cole and the Commotions) – 4:52
3. "Lost Weekend" (Lloyd Cole and the Commotions) – 3:15
4. "Cut Me Down" (Lloyd Cole and the Commotions) – 4:27

CD single (US, 1996)

1. "Sentimental Fool" – 3:25
2. "Sold" – 3:55
3. "Millionaire" – 3:04
4. "The Steady Slowing Down of the Heart" – 3:25

== Personnel ==
Production

- Stephen Street – producer ("Sentimental Fool", "Millionaire", "Sold")
- Lloyd Cole – producer ("Most of the Time", "The Steady Slowing Down of the Heart")
- Mick Glossop – mixing ("Sentimental Fool", "Millionaire", "Sold")
- Adam Peters – mixing ("Most of the Time"), production thanks ("Most of the Time")
- Clive Langer – producer ("Brand New Friend", "Lost Weekend", "Cut Me Down")
- Alan Winstanley – producer ("Brand New Friend", "Lost Weekend", "Cut Me Down")

== Charts ==
Chart (1995)	Peak position
UK Singles (Official Charts)	73
