= Lloyd Cole (album) =

Studio album by Lloyd Cole
- Released: 21 February 1990
- Recorded: 1988–1989
- Studios: Right Track, New York City
- Genre: Rock
- Length: 52:20
- Labels: Polydor, Capitol
- Producers: Lloyd Cole, Paul Hardiman, Fred Maher

Lloyd Cole chronology
Lloyd Cole (1990)	Don't Get Weird on Me Babe (1991)

Singles from Lloyd Cole
- 1. "No Blue Skies" Released: 27 January 1990; 2. "Don't Look Back" Released: 31 March 1990; 3. "Downtown" Released: 15 October 1990

Lloyd Cole, also known as The X Album, is the debut solo album by English singer, songwriter and musician Lloyd Cole released on 21 February 1990 by Polydor and Capitol. Previously Cole was best known for his work with the Commotions but this album marked a departure from their signature sound and an opportunity for him to collaborate with other musicians and explore new ideas.

== Background ==
Following the release of Mainstream, and limited touring and promotion in support of it, Cole left the Commotions. The chance to write and record new types of songs was the motivating factor.

"The Commotions had been a certain kind of pop band; a thoughtful pop band. I wanted to do everything the Commotions had not done; I wanted to make stupid rock 'n' roll or beautiful, almost, fleur bleue type music. The things someone in the band would have said no to were all the things I wanted to say yes to."

He also believed that the group had reached a natural conclusion and he no longer wanted the pressure and responsibility of managing a band. His self-titled debut album was written and recorded in New York, where, following the demise of the Commotions and a long-term relationship, he resided permanently. "I left London, because I was only there for two reasons," said Cole. "It was where the band recorded and it was where my girlfriend lived. I left to escape the shadow of these things after they had gone wrong. It was a chance to start over." Cole lived in a studio apartment in lower Manhattan where, over the course of six months, he wrote the songs for his first solo release. Turning his living space into a recording studio to demo ideas and sounds, he had to move his bed into the kitchen to make space for all the equipment. The songwriter found the New York environment and atmosphere inspiring, "I wrote more songs in [those] months than I had done in the previous couple of years." For the recording of the album, Cole wanted a nucleus of musicians to play with. He was first in contact with Fred Maher who would co-produce the album and also serve as the drummer. For the lead guitar, Cole already had had Robert Quine in mind long before a meeting was arranged by mutual acquaintance Maher. Blair Cowan, formerly of the Commotions, was re-united with Cole and would receive song writing credits for some of his contributions to the album. Matthew Sweet, then an obscure solo artist, was recruited under recommendation from Maher to play bass guitar.

All of the album was recorded and mixed at Right Track Studios in Manhattan with the exception of "No Blue Skies" which was recorded at Skyline Studios in NYC and mixed at Maison Rouge in London.

This period in Cole's life would later be the subject of the self-referential song "I Tried to Rock" released on The Negatives released in 2000. A self-deprecating song in which the singer makes light of the dramatic change in music, and his own lifestyle, after his move to New York.

== Composition ==
Cole made a conscious decision to change and evolve his lyrical style from that which he used in the Commotions. A new approach saw him less afraid to attempt more obvious themes and simpler narratives, "You get to the point, in writing, where the obvious is the best thing to do. I shied away from that for a long time. I think you have to be a better writer to use the obvious, and still make it sound fresh." The album opens with the track "Don't Look Back", which is about how people become more attracted to faith the older they become and the closer to death they get. The song's protagonist is based on character traits Cole feared he could attain. "No Blue Skies" was the first song released, "[It] is a simple song; boy leaves girl or girl leaves boy, bitterness. That's what I like about it, it's so simple," said Cole. The song was the last to be written and recorded for the album after Cole was told the album needed a lead single. After writing most of what would become "No Blue Skies", he was so pleased with it that he arranged for the song to be recorded immediately. Still in the process of writing the lyrics and structuring the song, in the studio he performed a rough vocal track to guide the other musicians. This would be the only vocal track recorded, after he was reluctantly convinced by the other musicians that it could not be bettered. "A Long Way Down" is based on the themes of excess and materialism but also serves as a song about a comedown. It was written for an unreleased film about a Glaswegian artist who becomes entangled in the New York high life, losing his values and sense of perspective in the process. The song "Undressed" has a double meaning, Cole explained: "Half the song is about nakedness, and the other half about emotional nakedness and, vulnerability. That's why it opens with the line, 'You look so good when you're depressed', because women do. It's really unfair!"

== Promotion and touring ==
Before the album was released, Cole began publicising the album in Paris, staying on in the city after enjoying a honeymoon. Large cardboard cut outs of the singer were displayed in record shops across Europe during the early days of the record release. Three singles were released for the album; "No Blue Skies" debuted just under a month before the release of the album to heighten anticipation, with a music video also produced. "Don't Look Back" followed, again with an accompanying music video. The final single was "Downtown", which would become a moderate radio success reaching number five on the US Modern Rock charts, making it Cole's most successful song in the US. The song was also included in the soundtrack for the film Bad Influence which starred Rob Lowe. The music video for the song featured excerpts from the film.

Before the release of the album, Cole plus Fred Maher, Matthew Sweet, Nicky Holland and Sprague Hollander performed as a live covers band under the monikers 'The Bob Dylan Band' and 'Billy Blake and The Eternals'. A bootleg of them performing at CBGBs currently circulates on the internet. Cole wanted the core of musicians who recorded the album to join him on tour in support of the album. Blair Cowan was signed up and Matthew Sweet was to play guitar instead of bass. Maher and Quine both declined, the latter had become disenchanted with the rigmarole of touring. Cole eventually convinced the guitarist to tour but it would be the last time he would play with any band on the road. Cole later praised Quine for his contribution to the band's live performances, "[He and] no-one else had my ear. We might as well have been called the Quine Band." Dan McCarroll (drums) and David Ball (bass) were later added to complete the line-up.

As well as tracks from the album, the shows would include songs from the Commotions' back catalogue, often with new arrangements, and cover versions including the Beatles' "Why Don't We Do It in the Road?" and Lou Reed's "A Gift".

== Reviews ==
Professional ratings
Review scores
Source	Rating
AllMusic	3/5 stars
NME	8/10
Record Mirror	3.5/5 stars
Smash Hits	6/10

Music Week made the record its album of the week; "[It] has all the trade-marks of his past work along with a couple of Stonesy riffs, greater vocal depth and a little more diversity in style. It takes a while to really get into but Cole's musings and the lush synthesized backing soon become irresistible. He's certainly lost none of his appeal." St. Petersburg Times gave the album a glowing review; "Cole uses his austere yet seductive voice to create mental pictures. His songs are vivid vignettes and scenarios... The songs are closely related enough to make Lloyd Cole a cohesive whole. Cole's shades are gray, but translucent enough to show musical light, and enjoyable enough to show he is a viable solo artist." The Guardian praised the assembled musicians who feature on the album, "They charge into the mostly laid-back, introspective material with a rare confidence, balancing crisp guitar lines against a moody swirl of Hammond organ, shifting gear for a chugging, wide-screen ballad setting, or showing their New York underground roots with a pounding muted rocker. They are so good that they could easily run away with the album, and it's to Cole's credit that his personality dominates." Record Mirror gave the album a positive review but identified the lack of exceptional material; "Of the 13 songs on the album, those with harder edges work best. The bluesy riffs of 'What Do You Know About Love', the gambolling bass and haunting harmonica of 'Downtown'... and the hard, Stones-ish rock of 'I Hate To See You Baby Doing That Stuff' smack of leathers and punky sneers. The single 'No Blue Skies' and the ballad 'Loveless' are the pick of the lighter moments on the album which, though not disappointing, offers no surprises or classics." The Washington Post criticised the album, describing it as "Moody, low-key and drowsy, this long album is almost too too Lloyd Cole, complete with such characteristically literary put-downs as 'Baby, you're too well-read.' A few more songs that aspire to the rambunctiousness of 'Sweetheart' or 'I Hate to See You Baby Doing That Stuff' would be welcome."

== Track listing ==
All lyrics are written by Lloyd Cole; all music is composed by Cole except where noted.

Lloyd Cole track listing
No.	Title	Writer(s)	Length
1.	"Don't Look Back"		3:47
2.	"What Do You Know About Love?"		4:09
3.	"No Blue Skies"		4:10
4.	"Loveless"	Cole, Blair Cowan	4:12
5.	"Sweetheart"		4:32
6.	"To the Church"		2:25
7.	"Downtown"	Cole, Cowan	5:20
8.	"A Long Way Down"		5:24
9.	"Ice Cream Girl"	Cole, Cowan	3:06
10.	"Undressed"		3:06
11.	"I Hate to See You Baby Doing That Stuff"	Cole, Fred Maher	4:00
12.	"Waterline"		3:02
13.	"Mercy Killing"		5:16

== Personnel ==
- Lloyd Cole – vocals (1–13), guitars (1–5, 7–13), bass (4, 5), piano (6, 7, 10), harmonica (7), synthesizers (6, 13), string and horn arrangements (8)
- Robert Quine – guitars (1–3, 5, 10–12)
- Blair Cowan – Hammond organ (1, 2, 4, 5, 7, 9, 10, 12, 13), synthesizers (3, 4, 7, 9)
- Matthew Sweet – bass (1–3, 7–13), guitar (3), backing vocals (3, 11)
- Fred Maher – drums (1–13), guitar (11, 13)
- Sprague Hollander – guitar (4, 9)
- Nicky Holland – backing vocals (1–5, 8, 13), string and horn arrangements (8)
- Parker DuLany – backing vocals (2, 8)
- Dorathea Strauchen – backing vocals (7)

== Charts ==
Chart performance for Lloyd Cole
Chart (1990)	Peak position
Australian Albums (ARIA)	49
European Albums (Eurotipsheet)	24
German Albums (Offizielle Top 100)	38
Swedish Albums (Sverigetopplistan)	6
UK Albums (Official Charts)	11

== Certifications ==
Certifications for Lloyd Cole
Region	Certification	Certified units/sales
United Kingdom (BPI)	Silver	60,000^{^}
^{^} Shipments figures based on certification alone.
