= Delaware corporate exodus =

Trend of U.S. firms fleeing Delaware

The Delaware corporate exodus is the accelerating trend, which began in 2024, of major U.S. corporations reincorporating from Delaware to other states perceived as more business-friendly, such as Texas and Nevada. Up until the start of this exodus, Delaware had been the most prevalent jurisdiction in the United States for corporate registrations due to the Delaware General Corporation Law. Consequently, Delaware was considered a corporate haven because of its business-friendly and anti-consumer corporate laws compared to most other U.S. states.

The Delaware corporate exodus stems from dissatisfaction with high-profile rulings by the Delaware Court of Chancery, particularly those expanding shareholder litigation risks and scrutinizing executive compensation under state corporate law. Critics, including prominent executives like Elon Musk, argue these decisions represent judicial overreach, fostering unpredictability and increasing legal costs for boards and founders.

As of November 2025, at least a dozen publicly traded companies with market capitalizations exceeding $1 billion have reincorporated elsewhere, signaling a potential shift in U.S. corporate governance norms. The trend has entered broader cultural and political discourse, with some observers framing it as a "culture war" over corporate law predictability versus shareholder protections. Informally known online as the "McCormick Effect" after Chancellor Kathaleen McCormick, it is more widely termed "DExit" in media coverage.

== Terminology ==
The exodus is commonly referred to as "DExit" (short for "Delaware Exit"), a portmanteau popularized in 2024 following Musk's public criticism of Delaware's courts and subsequent reincorporations by Tesla and others. The term appears in legal analyses and business press to describe the wave of reincorporations, often highlighting competition from states like Texas and Nevada. Separately, "McCormick Effect" has emerged in online discussions on X (formerly Twitter) as informal slang referencing the perceived impact of McCormick's rulings, with early uses in late 2024 and wider adoption in 2025 amid data on declining formations.

== Background ==
Delaware has dominated U.S. corporate incorporations since the early 20th century, hosting approximately 68% of Fortune 500 companies and generating over $2 billion annually in franchise taxes, which accounted for about 30% of the state's operating budget as of 2025. Its appeal stems from the specialized Court of Chancery, a non-jury equity court staffed by expert jurists who provide swift, predictable resolutions under the flexible Delaware General Corporation Law (DGCL). This framework has historically favored managerial discretion via the "business judgment rule," minimizing the second-guessing of board decisions absent conflicts of interest.

However, a series of Chancery Court decisions in the early 2020s, particularly those applying the stringent "entire fairness" standard to transactions involving controlling stockholders (e.g., founders or large investors), heightened litigation risks. These rulings, often authored or presided over by Chancellor McCormick—who assumed the role in 2021—shifted toward greater scrutiny of executive pay, merger approvals, and conflicted transactions, aligning more closely with plaintiff-friendly outcomes. Proponents view this as essential for protecting minority shareholders in an era of concentrated ownership, while detractors decry it as activism that undermines director protections and innovation, especially in tech and cryptocurrency sectors reliant on founder-led governance.

== Key rulings ==
The Delaware corporate exodus crystallized around several landmark Chancery Court decisions under McCormick's tenure:

- Tornetta v. Musk (January 2024): McCormick voided Elon Musk's $56 billion Tesla compensation package, approved by shareholders in 2018, ruling it breached fiduciary duties due to inadequate disclosure and conflicts. Despite a subsequent shareholder ratification in June 2024, the decision exemplified heightened judicial review of "all-performance" pay structures, prompting Musk to publicly warn against incorporating in Delaware.
- Moelis & Company (February 2024): Invalidated a merger agreement for failing to meet statutory disclosure requirements under DGCL §251, broadening scrutiny of deal protections and accelerating calls for legislative fixes.
- TripAdvisor, Inc. (2023–2024): Ruled against a going-private transaction involving founder control, applying entire fairness and highlighting risks for legacy family businesses.

These cases, collectively, amplified fears of "uncapped securities claims" and protracted litigation, with attorney fees in the Tesla case alone exceeding $345 million.

== Corporate responses ==
The rulings triggered a wave of reincorporations, dubbed "DExit" by activists and media. High-profile exits include:

Company	Sector	Destination	Date	Market Cap (2025)
Tesla, Inc.	Automotive/Technology	Texas	June 2024	$1.2T
SpaceX	Aerospace	Texas	2024	$210B (private)
Coinbase	Cryptocurrency	Texas	November 2025	$82B
Dropbox	Cloud Storage	Undisclosed	February 2025	$8B
TripAdvisor	Travel Technology	Nevada	2024	$3B
Andreessen Horowitz	Venture Capital	Nevada	2025	$43B (AUM)
Trump Media & Technology Group	Media	Florida	2024	$5B

Coinbase's Chief Legal Officer, Paul Grewal, cited Delaware's "unpredictability" as forcing the move, despite 78% shareholder approval. Texas has emerged as the top destination, offering no corporate income tax, specialized business courts under Senate Bill 29 (2025), and pro-crypto policies via the Texas Blockchain Council. Nevada appeals for its privacy protections and low taxes, while Florida attracts media and real estate firms.

The "Leave Delaware" movement, amplified on platforms like X, has mobilized executives and investors, with over 500,000 engagements on related posts by November 2025.

== Delaware's legislative response ==
Facing revenue threats, Delaware enacted emergency reforms, departing from its traditional expert-driven process via the Corporation Law Council:

- 2024 Market Practice Amendments: Validated stockholder agreements granting veto rights to investors, addressing cases like Moelis.
- 2025 DExit Amendments (Senate Bill 21, signed March 25): Overhauled the DGCL with safe harbors for conflicted transactions (§144), narrowed "controlling stockholder" definitions, controller exculpation, restricted §220 books-and-records demands, and eased derivative suit requirements. Critics, including McCormick herself, decried the "rushed" process as undermining the court's independence and Delaware's deliberative ethos.

Despite these measures, new incorporations dropped 8% in 2024–2025, with no mass exodus but sustained high-profile defections.

== Impact ==
The Delaware corporate exodus poses existential risks to Delaware's franchise, potentially costing hundreds of millions in lost fees and eroding its role in shaping national corporate law. Beneficiary states like Texas have gained momentum, with Governor Greg Abbott touting relocations as economic wins. Broader implications include heightened interstate competition, possible federal chartering proposals, and a reevaluation of equity court models. In cryptocurrency and tech, it accelerates migration to "innovation hubs," potentially influencing global incorporation trends.

While the exodus poses broader risks to Delaware's corporate franchise, its direct repercussions for Delawarians—the state's residents—have been minimal as of late 2025, with no evidence linking corporate reincorporations to immediate tax hikes or service cuts. Franchise tax losses from the dozen-plus high-profile DExits total under $10 million annually, representing less than 0.5% of the $2.2 billion revenue stream and a negligible 0.15% of the overall state budget. Independent analyses emphasize that these departures primarily affect non-resident entities with no local employment footprint, shielding Delaware's 1 million residents from job impacts. A projected $400 million FY2026 budget shortfall, which has spurred legislative debates on revenue protections, arises chiefly from federal tax reforms under the One Big Beautiful Bill Act rather than the exodus. Nonetheless, sustained trends could indirectly pressure public funding for education and infrastructure—key priorities comprising over 60% of expenditures—potentially leading to future fiscal adjustments if unchecked.

== See also ==
- Corporate law in the United States
- Delaware General Corporation Law
- Business judgment rule
- Elon Musk
- Corporate raid
