= Don't Look Back (Lloyd Cole song) =

1990 song by Lloyd Cole

Single by Lloyd Cole

from the album Lloyd Cole
- Released: 26 March 1990
- Length: 3:46
- Label: Polydor
- Songwriter(s): Lloyd Cole
- Producer(s): Lloyd Cole; Fred Maher; Paul Hardiman

Lloyd Cole singles chronology
"No Blue Skies" (1990)	"Don't Look Back" (1990)	"Downtown" (1990)

"Don't Look Back" is a song by English singer, songwriter and musician Lloyd Cole, released in 1990 as the second single from his self-titled studio album. The song was written by Cole and produced by Cole, Fred Maher and Paul Hardiman. It peaked at number 59 in the UK Singles Chart and remained in the top 100 for three weeks.

== Music video ==
The song's music video was directed by Matthew Chapman and produced by Laura Bickford for the production company VIVID.

== Critical reception ==
Upon its release as a single, David Giles of Music Week described "Don't Look Back" as "a fairly downbeat, almost countrified blues, track loaded with references to Cole's adopted homeland [the US]". He noted that there was "none of the subtle twists and turns of old, unfortunately". Tom Hingley of Inspiral Carpets, as guest reviewer for NME, commented, "The musical content of this record makes Dire Straits sound radical. You can hear tons of influences but it's all so unchallenging and formularised. It's quite pleasant sounding but who gives a fuck about that?"

Robin Smith of Record Mirror commented that the song "seems to have precious little substance underneath all the surrounding gloss" and added that it "gave me a hankering for those glorious days of 'Jennifer She Said'". Penelope Leyland of Australia's The Canberra Times considered it to be "workmanlike pop/rock" and noted that Cole "sounds much the same" as he did with the Commotions.

== Track listing ==
7–inch single (UK, Europe and Australia) and cassette single (UK)

1. "Don't Look Back" – 3:46
2. "Blame Mary Jane" – 3:49

10–inch limited edition and numbered single (UK and Europe)

1. "Don't Look Back" – 3:46
2. "Blame Mary Jane" – 3:49
3. "Witching Hour" – 3:53

12-inch and CD single (UK and Europe)

1. "Don't Look Back" – 3:46
2. "Blame Mary Jane" – 3:49
3. "Witching Hour" – 3:53

== Personnel ==
Credits are adapted from the Lloyd Cole CD album liner notes and the UK CD single.

"Downtown"

- Lloyd Cole – vocals, backing vocals, guitars
- Robert Quine – guitars
- Blair Cowan – Hammond organ
- Matthew Sweet – bass
- Fred Maher – drums
- Nicky Holland – backing vocals

Production

- Lloyd Cole – producer
- Fred Maher – producer
- Paul Hardiman – producer
- John Herman – additional engineering ("Don't Look Back")
- Tim Young – mastering ("Don't Look Back")

== Charts ==
Chart (1990)	Peak position
UK Singles (OCC)	59
