= FOC (album) =

Studio album by Far Out Corporation
- Released: 26 October 1998
- Recorded: January–February 1998
- Studio: Airlock Studios, East Brisbane
- Genre: Rock
- Length: 41:17
- Label: Polydor
- Producer: Tim Whitten, Far Out Corporation

FOC or Far Out Corporation is the only studio album released by Australian collaborative rock group, Far Out Corporation (a.k.a. the FOC), in October 1998. Its title is an initialism of the group's name. It is the sole album from the group, which was produced by Tim Whitten and the FOC at Airlock Studios, East Brisbane, via Polydor Records.

For FOC the group's line-up were Ian Haug on lead guitar and vocals (from Powderfinger), Grant McLennan on lead guitar and vocals (ex-the Go-Betweens, solo), Ross MacLennan (no relation) on drums and guitar (ex-Turtlebox) and Adele Pickvance on bass guitar and vocals (from Dave Graney Band).

Australian musicologist, Ian McFarlane, described FOC, which "successfully blended a pop sensibility with a more cerebral orientation (reminiscent of Underground Lovers, New Order or Velvet Underground)." He observed the band were, "[a] conceptual art group with a pop orientation."

== Track listing ==
All tracks are written by Ian Haug, Grant McLennan, Ross MacLennan, Adele Pickvance; unless otherwise indicated

No.	Title	Length
1.	"Don't Blame the Beam"	3:57
2.	"Hold"	4:16
3.	"Sick Bed"	3:18
4.	"Montreal"	3:46
5.	"Shadow Overload"	4:19
6.	"If You Want Release"	3:41
7.	"Sketch"	1:47
8.	"The Shower Song"	5:15
9.	"Suicide at Home"	2:52
10.	"Parachute"	3:32
11.	"Still Burn Down"	4:34

== Personnel ==
The FOC

- Ian Haug – lead guitar, vocals
- Grant McLennan – lead guitar, vocals
- Ross McLennan – drums, guitar
- Adele Pickvance – bass guitar, vocals

Additional musicians

- Matt Murphy – keyboards

Recording details

- Producer – Tim Whitten, the FOC at Airlock Studios, East Brisbane
- Audio engineer – Tim Whitten
- Mixing at Paradise Studios, Sydney

Artworks

- Cover art – Kino Ruin (design)
