= Like Lovers Do (Lloyd Cole song) =

1995 single by Lloyd Cole

Single by Lloyd Cole

from the album Love Story
- Released: 28 August 1995
- Length: 3:58
- Label: Fontana; Rykodisc (US)
- Songwriter: Lloyd Cole
- Producers: Stephen Street; Lloyd Cole

Lloyd Cole singles chronology
"Morning Is Broken" (1993)	"Like Lovers Do" (1995)	"Sentimental Fool" (1995)

"Like Lovers Do" is a song by English singer, songwriter and musician Lloyd Cole, released in 1995 as the lead single from his fourth studio album, Love Story (1995). The song was written by Cole and produced by Stephen Street and Cole. As Cole's only UK top 40 solo hit single to date, "Like Lovers Do" peaked at number 24 in the UK Singles Chart and remained in the top 75 for three weeks.

== Background ==
Despite launching his solo career in 1990, "Like Lovers Do" was Cole's first (and only to date) solo entry in the top 40 of the UK Singles Chart. He told the Daily Record in 1995, "I was ready for failure, absolutely, but the success we are having right now is just down to a lot of good fortune, and that's that. We are so lucky the radios picked it up, because I am extremely unfashionable in Britain right now."

== Music video ==
Recalling the song's music video in 2009, Cole said, "I always thought it was an awful video. I wasn't involved much."

== Critical reception ==
Upon its release as a single, Music & Media wrote, "Cole is one of those rare artists who can let time stand still and yet manage to move on. This fine country-esque song could just as easily have been included on his 1984 debut as on his new CD." Gordon Barr of the Newcastle Evening Chronicle gave the song a 7 out of 10 rating and stated, "The voice is instantly recognisable and the tune's not half bad either. A pleasant, mellow offering that should see Lloyd back on the pop map before too long." The Dumfries & Galloway Standard listed the song as one of their two "barnstorm disc[s] of the week". The reviewer considered the song to be "equally as good" as the material on Lloyd Cole and the Commotions' 1984 debut album Rattlesnakes and added, "Cole is too mellow to come back with anything like a bang, but back to his best he most certainly is. If the rest of his new album is up to the same standard, he should make his way back into the forefront of the British music scene with considerable ease." Johnny Cigarettes of NME was negative in his review, writing, "This one jangles along tastefully enough, with the obligatory wordy lyrics and Lloyd's vaguely smoky twang failing to paper over the complete and utter lack of any passion, interest, or indeed tune."

== Track listing ==
CD single (UK #1)

1. "Like Lovers Do" – 3:58
2. "Traffic" (Album Outtake – Long Version) – 4:20
3. "Forest Fire" (Lloyd Cole and the Commotions) – 4:45

CD single (UK #2)

1. "Like Lovers Do" – 3:58
2. "Brand New Baby Blues" (Demo) – 3:16
3. "Perfect Skin" (Lloyd Cole and the Commotions) – 3:09

CD single (UK #3)

1. "Like Lovers Do" – 3:58
2. "I Will Not Leave You Alone" – 2:22
3. "Rattlesnakes" (Lloyd Cole and the Commotions) – 3:26

CD single (Europe and Australia)

1. "Like Lovers Do" – 3:58
2. "Forest Fire" – 4:45
3. "Rattlesnakes" – 3:26
4. "Perfect Skin" – 3:09

CD single (Europe, cardboard sleeve)

1. "Like Lovers Do" – 3:58
2. "I Will Not Leave You Alone" – 2:22

CD single (US)

1. "Like Lovers Do" – 3:58
2. "I Will Not Leave You Alone" – 2:18
3. "Brand New Baby Blues" (Demo) – 3:16
4. "Most of the Time" – 4:10

== Personnel ==
Production

- Stephen Street – producer ("Like Lovers Do")
- Lloyd Cole – producer ("Like Lovers Do", "Brand New Baby Blues", "I Will Not Leave You Alone", "Most of the Time")
- Mick Glossop – mixing ("Like Lovers Do", "Traffic", "I Will Not Leave You Alone")
- Paul Hardiman – producer ("Forest Fire", "Perfect Skin", "Rattlesnakes")
- Adam Peters – mixing ("Brand New Baby Blues"), production thanks ("I Will Not Leave You Alone", "Brand New Baby Blues", "Most of the Time")

Other

- Nan Goldin – photography

== Charts ==
Chart (1995)	Peak position
Europe (Eurochart Hot 100)	96
Europe (European Hit Radio)	25
UK Singles (Official Charts)	24
UK Top 50 Airplay (Music Week)	37
