= Horsebreaker Star =

Studio album by Grant McLennan
- Released: 1994
- Recorded: 1994
- Studios: John Keane, Athens, Georgia
- Genre: Alternative rock
- Length: 95:27
- Labels: Concubine, Beggars Banquet
- Producer: John Keane

Grant McLennan chronology
Fireboy (1992)	Horsebreaker Star (1994)	In Your Bright Ray (1997)

Professional ratings
Review scores
Source	Rating
AllMusic	4.5/5 stars
Chicago Tribune	3/4 stars
Christgau's Consumer Guide	A−
The Guardian	3/4 stars
The Philadelphia Inquirer	3.5/4 stars
Rolling Stone	4/5 stars

Horsebreaker Star is the third solo album by Grant McLennan, a member of the Go-Betweens. McLennan recorded the album in Athens, Georgia, with American musicians. It was also the only ever double album associated with the Go-Betweens. In a 1995 interview he said the album had been "a lot of work".

"I wanted it to be the kind of record that could be played by anyone, but not too obvious. You know, the London Symphony Orchestra doesn't have to do the ballads, Johnny Cash doesn't have to do the country songs. I don't like to be that predictable. I like surprises," he said.

This was the first of his solo albums credited to "Grant", rather than "G.W." as on the previous two.

The single-disc American release stripped off six songs — "Late Afternoon in Early August" and "Ballad of Easy Rider" from the first disc and "Do Your Own Thing" through "Head over Heels" from the second — while adding on "Lighting Fires" from Fireboy. Neither version sold well.

== Reception ==
In CMJ New Music Monthly, Franklin Bruno said, "His solo work seems fascinated by its own simplicity. Some tunes get a sparse country treatment, others get a fuller pop production, but nearly everything here would be equally effective in a solo acoustic setting. When McLennan is this good, one can almost forgive the tepid, anonymous backing that plagues the album's weaker stretches." Robert Christgau said McLennan "cut his most consistently catchy solo album by getting off the plane in Georgia and recording 30 snapshots of a resigned romantic, every damn one he had, with a producer and musicians he'd never met. With too many backing vocals, not enough licks, and a rather mild lead singer, the pleasures emerge gradually."

== Tour ==
McLennan toured the US, Europe and Australia in 1995 to promote the album, playing with musicians including Anna Burley and Dave Folley from the Killjoys, and Phil Kakulas from Blackeyed Susans. His American performances received highly favourable reviews from The New York Times and Rolling Stone, which called McLennan "one of the world's great songwriters".

== Track listing ==
All tracks written by Grant McLennan, except where noted.

Disc one

1. "Simone & Perry" – 4:09
2. "Ice in Heaven" – 4:22
3. "What Went Wrong" – 8:11
4. "Race Day Rag" – 2:03
5. "Don't You Cry for Me No More" – 3:06
6. "Put You Down" – 4:46
7. "Late Afternoon in Early August" – 2:47
8. "Coming Up for Air" – 3:43
9. "Ballad of Easy Rider" (Roger McGuinn) – 3:48
10. "Open Invitation" – 4:53
11. "Open My Eyes" – 3:22
12. "From My Lips" – 2:31

Disc two

1. "Dropping You" – 3:16
2. "Hot Water" – 3:47
3. "Keep My Word" – 3:28
4. "Do Your Own Thing" – 2:58
5. "That's That" – 3:23
6. "If I Was a Girl" – 6:01
7. "Head over Heels" – 2:47
8. "Girl in a Beret" – 4:31
9. "All Her Songs" – 4:12
10. "No Peace in the Palace" – 4:15
11. "I'll Call You Wild" – 4:41
12. "Horsebreaker Star" – 4:13

== Personnel ==
- Grant McLennan – guitars, vibes, vocals
- John Keane – guitars, banjo, keyboards, bass, xylophone, percussion, backing vocals
- Joel Morris – drums
- Steve Venz – bass
- Andy Carlson – strings, electric guitar, mandolin
- Tim White – organ, piano
- Bill Holmes – organ, piano
- Dwight Manning – oboe
- Syd Straw – backing vocals
- Esta Hill – backing vocals ("Put You Down")
