= Fireboy =

Studio album by Grant McLennan
- Released: 1993
- Recorded: Paradise, Sydney, Platinum, Melbourne
- Genre: Alternative rock
- Length: 52:42
- Label: White Label
- Producer: Dave Dobbyn

Grant McLennan chronology
Watershed (1991)	Fireboy (1993)	Horsebreaker Star (1994)

Fireboy is the second solo album by Grant McLennan, a member of the Go-Betweens. It was released in 1993. In the album's liner notes McLennan said the songs were for Gloria Swanson, Kenneth Slessor, Brett Whiteley and Dean Martin. Produced by Dave Dobbyn, it was recorded in Woolloomooloo. The first single was "Surround Me".

== Critical reception ==
Professional ratings
Review scores
Source	Rating
Calgary Herald	B+
Robert Christgau	(2-star Honorable Mention)

Trouser Press called the album "a near-perfect convergence of observant, passionate words and jangly, surging tunes." The Calgary Herald wrote that McLennan "sings with conviction [and] poetic insight."

AllMusic wrote: "If there are hints of older rock styles here and there, McLennan's singing in particular still has the sharp, modern edge that helped make the Go-Betweens great, all while not losing his trademark warmth."

== Track listing ==
All tracks written by Grant McLennan, except where noted.

1. "Lighting Fires" – 3:36
2. "Surround Me" – 3:55
3. "One Million Miles from Here" – 3:45
4. "The Dark Side of Town" – 3:46
5. "Things Will Change" – 2:45
6. "The Pawnbroker" – 8:12
7. "Whose Side Are You On?" – 3:09
8. "Fingers" (Grant McLennan, Dave Dobbyn)– 3:34
9. "Signs of Life" – 4:23
10. "The Day My Eyes Came Back" – 4:08
11. "Bathe (in the Water)" – 3:30
12. "When I Close My Eyes" – 1:24
13. "Riddle in the Rain" – 6:29

== Personnel ==
- Grant McLennan – vocals, guitars, tambourine, maracas
- Dave Dobbyn – guitars, keyboards, backing vocals
- Ian Belton – bass
- Pedro Bull – organ, piano
- Michael Barclay – drums, backing vocals
- Penny Flanagan – vocals ("Surround Me", "Bathe")
- Julia Richardson – vocals ("Surround Me", "Bathe")
- Karin Jansson – vocals ("The Dark Side of Town", "Things Will Change")
- Mae Moore – vocals ("Bathe")
- Nicky Ferguson – vocals ("Lighting Fires")
- Stephen Hurley – organ ("Bathe")
