= Flygprestanda =

Swedish aviation company

Flygprestanda AB
- Type: Aktiebolag
- Industry: Aviation
- Founded: 1969
- Headquarters: Malmö, Sweden
- Area served: Worldwide
- Products: Guru
- Services: Airport analysis
- Revenue: ▼SEK 29,959,000 (2012)
- Net income: ▼SEK 557,000 (2012)
- Total assets: ▼SEK 10,556,000 (2012)
- Total equity: ▼SEK 3,261,000 (2012)
- Number of employees: 41 (2012)
- Website: flygp.se

Flygprestanda AB (ICAO: FPA) is a Swedish aviation company specializing in the support of takeoff and landing calculations. This is done in part through their 'Guru' software, powered by an airport database derived partly from national Aeronautical Information Publications and NOTAMS. As of January 2011, the database covers more than 6000 airports.

One of their other core services is the creation of Route Performance Manuals, which deal with the efficiency of aircraft operations. Flygprestanda were present during the 2008 Middle East Business Aviation Association conference, showcasing their 'Guru' software, and again in 2010 focusing on a new product called FOCS dealing with flight scheduling, planning, route finding & ATC filing services. The company is ISO 9001 certified and have a secondary office in the United States
