= Bad Vibes (Lloyd Cole album) =

Studio album by Lloyd Cole
- Released: 11 October 1993
- Recorded: 1992–1993
- Length: 47:39
- Label: Fontana
- Producer: Adam Peters

Lloyd Cole chronology
Don't Get Weird on Me Babe (1991)	Bad Vibes (1993)	Love Story (1995)

Bad Vibes is the third studio album by Lloyd Cole. It was released in October 1993 on Fontana Records and reached number 38 on the UK Albums Chart and number 8 on the Swedish chart.

== Critical reception ==
Professional ratings
Review scores
Source	Rating
NME	5/10

Upon its release, Johnny Dee of NME gave a mixed review of Bad Vibes. He commented that, like Cole's previous two solo albums, there was "plenty to recommend" and praised the "majestic" "Morning Is Broken", the "lyrical wisecracks" of "So You'd Like to Save the World" and the "druggy Beatles drawl" of "Love You So What". He felt the album then "very quickly get[s] bogged down in arty sleaze", picking "Wild Mushrooms" as the "nadir" and adding that "there's more lyrical embarrassments" on "Can't Get Arrested". He concluded, "If only he'd stop trying to impress us. 'Identity Crisis – The Musical' would have been a better title." Sarra Manning of Melody Maker noted the album's "definite Sixties timbre, as in little acoustic refrains, gently thumping piano and windy chords like raindrops on windowpanes" and described Cole as "a slightly worn voice that breaks into throaty emphasis on a caustic word". She was critical of "Fall Together" and "Can't Get Arrested" for being "truly horrendous Beatles' pastiches", but concluded, "Forget all your ill-conceived notions of what's credible and what's not and make room for 11 songs that put some aesthetic equilibrium back in your life."

== Track listing ==
1. "Morning Is Broken" – 5:19
2. "So You'd Like to Save the World" – 3:30
3. "Holier Than Thou" – 3:53
4. "Love You So What" – 3:26
5. "Wild Mushrooms" – 2:09
6. "My Way to You" – 4:18
7. "Too Much of a Good Thing" – 5:04
8. "Fall Together" – 4:50
9. "Mister Wrong" – 3:24
10. "Seen the Future" – 3:21
11. "Can't Get Arrested" – 8:25

1994 reissue bonus tracks

12. "For the Pleasure of Your Company" – 3:42
13. "4 M.B." – 4:46

== Personnel ==
- Lloyd Cole
- Ann Charlotte Vensgaarde
- Anton Fier
- "Lightning" Bob Hoffnar
- Curtis Watts
- Dan McCarroll
- Dana Vlcek
- Fred Maher
- John Valentine Carruthers
- John Micco
- Matthew Sweet
- Neil Clark
- Peter Mark

Technical

- Dave O'Donnell, Fred Kevorkian, Jon Goldberger, Lloyd Puckitt, Michael White, Mike Krowiak – recording engineers
- Bob Clearmountain – mixing
- David Sims – photography

== Charts ==
Chart performance for Bad Vibes
Chart (1993)	Peak position
European Albums (Eurotipsheet)	69
Swedish Albums (Sverigetopplistan)	8
UK Albums (OCC)	38
