= Flag of convenience (business) =

In business and commerce, the term flag of convenience is the use of a place, jurisdiction, state or country as a nominal (in name only) "home base" for one's operations or charter, even though either no or virtually no operations or business are conducted there. It is also used where the organization operates in one place even though nearly all of its customers are from elsewhere. It is a type of jurisdiction shopping.

There are several reasons for doing this.

== Corporation requirements ==
The most common use of a flag of convenience is a U.S. corporation being chartered as a domestic corporation in Nevada or Delaware because of favorable corporate governance rules. The reason for this sort of a choice is that, in general, in the United States, a corporation which operates in more than one state (or country) has a particular state where it is incorporated, to which it is a domestic corporation. In all other states where it operates and has filed papers to be allowed to operate, it is a foreign corporation, and the requirements for corporate governance in the case of a lawsuit do not use the law where the corporation is sued, but instead, the law where the corporation is a domestic corporation.

For example, because the provisions on "piercing the corporate veil" are corporate governance matters, if a corporation is chartered in California, for example, (which has much more creditor friendly provisions permitting this) is sued anywhere, California law applies, but a corporation chartered in Nevada, which operates only in California, is sued in a California court, the California court would use Nevada law in determining what the requirements permitting this, and in this issue Nevada law applies (which is much more supportive of the corporation's interest), even if the corporation only operates in California and has never had any other contact with Nevada and is simply chartered there as a flag of convenience.

Another use is for tax reasons. At least one major software development company licenses its software through a subsidiary Nevada corporation, which has no state income tax, rather than licensing through the parent corporation (chartered in a different state that does have a state income tax), saving millions of dollars in taxes.

== Legal restrictions on operations ==
Use of a different base of operations than one normally operates within can often be done because of legal restrictions on operations in one area which are avoided by changing the nominal base of operations.

=== Television ===
- Television station WPKD-TV is licensed to Jeannette, Pennsylvania, even though it serves the city of Pittsburgh because no station allocation slots are available for the latter.
- During the 1960s, it was noted that San Diego could support another television station, but because of allocations already given to Los Angeles, and the Mexican Government having two channels allocated to it for the neighboring city of Tijuana, there were no channel spaces available, so a Mexican corporation obtained a license from that government to operate XETV, Channel 6, which operated exclusively in English from the late 1950s until 2017, when it began broadcasting exclusively in Spanish. During its tenure as an English-language station, it basically served the city of San Diego even though it then (as now) broadcast from Tijuana.
- RKO General was the owner of New York City television station WOR-TV, channel 9, when a series of scandals broke involving its parent company, General Tire. As part of the settlement of issues, Channel 9 moved from New York City to Secaucus, New Jersey in 1983 in order to give New Jersey its first commercial VHF television station since 1962 (Newark's original independent WATV 13 had become what is now WNET). Nonetheless, the station's market is almost exclusively the New York City area. Channel 9's renewal was approaching, and at the time, a federal law had been passed that gave automatic renewal to any station that moved to a state that did not have a TV station. The only states this applied to were New Jersey and Delaware, so to get around its licensing problems, RKO moved its station from New York to New Jersey to take advantage of the automatic approval of renewal.

=== Radio ===
- From the 1960s to the 1980s, AM radio station XETRA, located in Tijuana, Baja California, Mexico, operated on a frequency of 690 kHz, with an entirely English programming format, and was primarily directed toward listeners in Southern California. During the 1960s and 1970s, it broadcast all news. During the 1980s, it broadcast Top 40 (most popular rock-and-roll) music, having a large enough audience to be one of the top radio stations in the region. The station operated as what is called a border blaster, a station operated in one country almost exclusively for one or more neighboring countries.

=== Fireworks ===
- The tourist attraction South of the Border, is located in Dillon, South Carolina, about 300 feet (91 m) from the border between North Carolina and South Carolina, and sells tremendous amounts of fireworks to people from other states, including North Carolina, where such sales are illegal.
- It is illegal in the Commonwealth of Pennsylvania for residents of the state to have fireworks and it is illegal to sell fireworks in Pennsylvania to a resident, however, it is legal to sell fireworks to non-residents of Pennsylvania who are buying them to take them out of the state, thus a number of fireworks stores in Pennsylvania operate to sell fireworks only to non-residents, who must show an out-of-state license.
- A number of small towns in California permit some fireworks to be sold, while the nearby larger communities forbid them, so residents will often visit small towns nearby to buy fireworks to take home and use.
- Washington, D.C. permits the sale of fireworks while the neighboring jurisdictions of Montgomery and Prince George's counties in Maryland do not; in some cases, police from those jurisdictions would watch fireworks stands outside of the state, collect license tag numbers of cars that visited them, and if the person drove into Maryland, would stop and ticket them for having illegal fireworks.

=== Alcohol ===
- In some parts of the United States the local community has banned the sale, and possibly, the use of alcohol in a so-called dry county. In this case, a nearby county which is not dry will have a liquor store which is much larger than that county could actually support because it also provides alcohol for the residents of the (one or more) dry counties near it.
- Very high excise taxes on alcohol in the Nordic countries has resulted in considerable reimportation of alcohol and conflicts with European Union legislation. For example, Åland, an autonomous province of Finland, is not a part of the EU VAT area and ships stopping at any of the ports of Åland can sell tax-free alcohol, much of which is often Finnish-produced.

=== Excise goods ===
- Items which are subject to heavy taxes at point of sale (such as motor fuels, alcohol and tobacco, perfumes and luxury items) often are offered for sale at border crossings. Some are the staples of "duty-free shops", which sell solely to clients who are leaving the country and who otherwise would need to pay a higher price for the identical commodities at their intended destination. One of the rare instances in which a Petro-Canada station has operated abroad was to serve a busy interstate highway at a Québec border crossing near St. Albans, Vermont.

=== Merchandising ===
- Due to opposition from residents in the community in which it would normally operate, some operators of big-box stores will move into a small community or unincorporated township and operate there, even though the general customer base of the store is the much larger (intended) community. Builders of large factories and shopping centres have often chosen locations just outside a community's city limits to take advantage of more favourable municipal tax rates or less stringent or non-existent urban planning restrictions in an adjacent municipality or semi-rural area.

== In fiction ==
- In the movie Footloose the particular town where all the high school students in the movie live, has outlawed public dancing, so one student decides to hold the dance (with the suggestion of the owner) in the flour warehouse located immediately next to the town in the town of Basin which does not have a ban on dancing.

== See also ==
- Dépeçage
- Choice of law clause
