= Nevada corporation =

Incorporation method

A Nevada corporation is a corporation incorporated under Chapter 78 of the Nevada Revised Statutes of the U.S. state of Nevada. It is significant in United States corporate law. Nevada, like Delaware (see Delaware General Corporation Law), is well known as a state that offers a corporate haven. Many major corporations are incorporated in Nevada, particularly corporations whose headquarters are located in California and other Western states.

== Piercing the veil ==
Nevada law provides extremely strong protection against piercing the corporate veil, where a corporation's owners can be held responsible for the actions of a corporation. For instance, from 1987 to 2007, there was only one case that successfully pierced the corporate veil of a Nevada corporation, and in this case the veil was pierced due to fraud on the part of the corporation's owners.

Because the provisions on "piercing the corporate veil" are corporate governance matters, if a corporation chartered in California, for example, (which has much more creditor-friendly provisions) is sued anywhere, California law applies. In contrast, if a corporation chartered in Nevada, which operates only in California, is sued in a California court, the California court would use Nevada law in determining the requirements to hold the company's owners (i.e. shareholders) personally responsible. In other words, Nevada law applies (which is much more supportive of the corporation's interest), even if the corporation only operates in California and has never had any other contact with Nevada and is simply chartered there as a "flag of convenience." Note that foreign corporations, including those, for example, incorporated in Nevada, may be subject to California Corporation Code 2115.

== Director primacy ==
Nevada's laws offer flexibility to a board of directors in managing the affairs of a corporation, and permit management to put in place strong protection from hostile takeovers. Nevada (unlike other states) permits the corporation's articles of incorporation to vest authority to adopt, amend or repeal bylaws exclusively in the directors, so that shareholders would not be able to change the corporation's bylaws.

== Tax benefits ==
Nevada's tax structure is also a large benefit to incorporation in Nevada. Nevada has no franchise tax. It also has no corporate tax or personal income tax. There is an annual $200 "Business License Fee" which is paid to the Secretary of State's office at the time of formation or renewal of the corporation.

Nevada additionally applies a 1.475% tax rate for most General Business employers, as opposed to Financial Institutions, on wages after deduction of health benefits paid by the employer and certain wages paid to qualified veterans—that tax is equivalent to a personal income tax. The first $50,000 of gross wages is not taxable as a state tax, however federal taxes do apply. Nevada also imposes a "Commerce Tax" on businesses with Nevada gross revenue exceeding $4,000,000 within a taxable year. Nevada and Texas are the only two states that do not have information sharing agreements with the Internal Revenue Service. In addition there are,

- No state corporate income tax, franchise tax, personal income tax, or taxes on corporate shares
- No IRS information-sharing agreement (although other states' incorporation laws often supersede Nevada law in certain cases)
- Low annual fees and minimal reporting/disclosure requirements
- Stockholders, directors, and officers are not public record, not required to reside or hold meetings in Nevada, and are not required to be US citizens
- Directors not required to hold stock
- Officers/directors are protected from personal liability for lawful acts of the corporation
- Corporations may purchase, hold, sell, or transfer shares of its own stock
- Corporations may issue stock for capital, services, personal property, or real estate, including leases and options
- Directors may determine the value of any transactions; their decision is final once determined

== Regulatory competition debate ==
Organizers of a business generally have a choice on where to incorporate the business. In the United States, corporations are generally organized pursuant to state law, rather than federal law. Moreover, a business need not establish or maintain a physical presence in a state in order to incorporate under the state's general corporation law. If the corporation transacts business in a state other than the state of incorporation, it is considered by the other state to be a foreign corporation. See NRS Chapter 80. For example, a business may be headquartered in San Jose, California but incorporated in Nevada. The corporation is a Nevada corporation and the State of California will consider it to be a foreign corporation. See California Corporations Code Section 171.

In the United States, states generally, but not invariably, follow the internal affairs doctrine. "The internal affairs doctrine is a conflict of laws principle which recognizes that only one State should have the authority to regulate a corporation's internal affairs ... because otherwise a corporation could be faced with conflicting demands." Under the internal affairs doctrine, courts will generally apply the law of the state of incorporation to the "internal affairs" of the corporation.

States can derive revenues through the incorporation of businesses. These revenues include direct payments to the state in the form of filing and other fees. The state can also receive revenues indirectly through businesses (law firms, resident agents, accounts and other service providers) to corporations. The Nevada legislature has tried to make Nevada an attractive alternative to Delaware as a state for incorporation. In many instances, it has tried to "out Delaware" Delaware.

Disputes over the internal affairs of Nevada corporations are usually filed in the Nevada District Courts, from which judgments can be appealed to the Supreme Court of Nevada, the state supreme court. Because of the large number of corporations chartered in Nevada, the courts in that state are more focused on the application of corporate law than the courts of most other states. Nevada's courts are developing a strong body of case law that serves to give corporations and their counsel guidance on matters of corporate governance, although Delaware and some other states have a larger body of such case law. Nevada's lack of a court dedicated solely to business matters has resulted in calls for the adoption of a chancery court system, which would have exclusive jurisdiction over all business cases and will assist in growing Nevada's body of business case law.

== See also ==
- United States corporate law
