= Lee Remick (song) =

- Australian 7" vinyl single (1978) – Able Label

Single by The Go-Betweens
- A-side: "Lee Reemick"
- B-side: "Karen"
- Released: September 1978
- Recorded: 16 May 1978; Window Studios, Brisbane
- Genre: Jangle pop; indie pop
- Length: 2:28
- Label: Able Label
- Songwriter: Robert Forster

The Go-Betweens singles chronology
"Lee Remick" (1978)	"People Say" (1979)

"Lee Remick" is the debut single by Australian indie group The Go-Betweens. It was released in September 1978 by the Australian independent record label, Able Label, with only 700 copies of the 7" vinyl record produced.

Both songs were re-released on The Able Label Singles in 1986 (together with "People Say" and "Don't Let Him Come Back") and on the 1999 compilation album, 78 'til 79 The Lost Album. In January 2009 the German label, Little Teddy Recordings, re-issued the single for the 30th anniversary of its original release. Only 500 vinyl copies were pressed. The copies were dubbed from the original vinyl record as the original master tapes of the recordings, which were sent to Beserkley Records in 1988, were subsequently lost and are presumed to have been destroyed in a fire.

== History ==
In the late 1970s Grant McLennan, who was working part-time at the Toowong Music Centre, a small independent record store, suggested to the owner, Damien Nelson, that they establish a record label. With funding from Nelson, McLennan and Forster they established the Able Label. The first release on the new label was the Go-Betweens' "Lee Remick". The song was recorded at Window Studios on 16 May 1978 (the same studio that The Saints had recorded "(I'm) Stranded" eighteen months earlier), with Dennis Cantwell, the drummer of fellow Brisbane band, The Numbers. In David Nichols' seminal book on the Go-Betweens, Forster recalls that the selection of the studio was fortunate "We got it out of the phone book. It was twenty-four track, it had good microphones. We did it in three hours. It would have been only the twentieth time we'd played those songs ever."

The single however was not released until September as Nelson, Forster and McLennan, who were essentially ignorant about the vinyl-pressing process, had ordered a thousand labels for the record, with each one having to be moistened and individually applied to the record by hand. Nelson stating "We got 700 of these singles back, then we got the labels for the A-side and the B-side. And we just sat around the table sticking them on." By the time the single was released the group had appointed the band's first full-time drummer, Temucin Mustafa, who is listed on the sleeve as a member of the band even though he didn't play on the recordings. The single's sleeve depicts Forster and McLennan alongside portraits of Bob Dylan, Che Guevara and Lee Remick.

In a subsequent interview Forster recalls "It was one of the first songs I wrote. I wanted to write a love song. But I wasn't in love with anyone, so I just projected it towards that screen image. I didn't know anyone I felt strongly enough about to write a love song for." He also stated "I didn't have a girlfriend or any sort of romantic side to my life ... I wanted to write a love song. But who was I in love with? No-one. I had to find someone and I found Lee Remick".

The B-side to the single, "Karen", was written as a tribute to the University of Queensland library staff. Forster states "'Karen' is a song I wrote while I was there [University of Queensland]. I spent a lot of time in the libraries and the librarians had this stillness about them I found very attractive." and "They reminded me a little of nuns in a convent. There was kindness in the library, then you walk out of the library into the harsh real world."

In January 1979 the group claimed to have sold over 500 copies of the single, with copies distributed in Sydney and Melbourne by Robert Vickers (a member of The Numbers), along with copies of his band's single, "Sunset Strip", also on the Able Label. Vickers later became the bass guitarist for the band, between the 1983 and 1987. The Go-Betweens used "Lee Remick" as a promotional tool, sending copies to magazines and record labels around the world. This resulted in the English arm of US label Beserkley Records, contacting the group and offering them a contract, for "Lee Remick" and "Karen" to be re-issued as separate singles, a further two singles to be recorded, followed by an eight-album deal. Beserkley Records however dissolved before the band were able to finalise the contract.

== Reception ==
According to Australian musicologist, Ian McFarlane, both singles were "sparsely produced, poorly played yet passionately performed folksy, post-punk pop songs. They were sunny, catchy and hopelessly romantic, earning the band immediate local and international acclaim".

Allmusic's Ned Raggett describes the "Lee Remick" as being "quirky, cinema-obsessed, wry. ...might not have been as swooningly romantic (or regretfully so) as many future highlights, but in its own odd little way it shows more than a little something of what made the Go-Betweens so special. Musically, if everything is a touch more tight and tense, it isn't punkishly so. "Lee Remick" is sung, not sneered, obviously in debt to '60s pop and rock in its own giddy way. Everything is little more than a mash note to an unapproachable star in the end, but as a sweet little singalong that at least helped get the band out there somewhere in Australia, rough and simple as it was (check Grant McLennan's bass line, which is about as basic as one can get). Killer line that ensures the song is more than a curiosity: 'She was in The Omen with Gregory Peck/She got killed – what the heck?'"

Stanton Swihart, also from Allmusic describes, the B-side, "Karen", as having a "beatnik nonchalance", "with its literary roll call – Hemingway, Genet, Brecht, Joyce – is very much in the mold of Dylan, even showing a similarly effortless, tongue-in-cheek artsiness."

Andrew Street in the Australian music website, Mess+Noise, describes the song as "Robert Forster’s ode to the titular screen goddess, is a piece of awesome three-chord indie-thrash."

London in Stereo's Gareth Ware stated that it was "An infectious slice of Monkees-esque pop, ‘Lee Remick’ would at once show their way with a tune and what happens when film buffs are given free reign [sic] to write lyrics. On its b-side, ‘Karen‘, Forster would again demonstrate his way with words by channelling The Modern Lovers to describe his own loneliness and a yearning for excitement."

Joseph Neff describes "Lee Remick” as being "a truly swank mixture of bubblegum wittiness and an incessant melody, while the plainly Modern Lovers-derived “Karen” succeeds by not skimping on the VU and then conjuring up a narrative of sizeable depth."

Jon Dolan in the Chicago Reader however states "Forster's ode to Remick isn't a love song, and it's only vestigially related to the kind of pop-culture fetishizing made hip by Redd Kross. Skittish and punchy, with a terse chorus or two of ba ba ba ba bas, it seems more than anything a slightly clunky attempt to rewrite Richman's "Roadrunner" or the Velvets' "Sweet Jane" as his own peculiar theme of outsider identification. The B side, "Karen," is the real love song, a skeletal, moody, mid-tempo-then-speeding-up-as-the-blood-boils ode to a librarian who helped Forster find Hemingway, Chandler, Genet, Brecht, and Joyce: "She always makes the right choice!""

== Cover versions ==
Other artists have performed cover versions of "Lee Remick". In 1993, the Swedish band the Wannadies covered the song on their EP ”Cherry Man”. They have played the song live several times. Most recently on their 2022 tour.

The band the Meanies covered the song on the Go-Betweens tribute album, Right Here (1996); Patience Hodgson (of the Grates) on another tribute album, Write Your Adventures Down (2007) disc one; and Darren Hanlon on that same album's second disc.

== Track listing ==
No.	Title	Writer(s)	Length
1.	"Lee Remick"	R. Forster	2:28
2.	"Karen"	R. Forster	4:04
Total length:			6:32

== Release history ==
Date	Region	Label	Format	Catalogue
September 1978	Australia	Able Label	7" vinyl	AB001
27 January 2009	Germany	Little Teddy Recordings	7" vinyl	LiTe743

== Credits ==
The Go-Betweens

- Robert Forster – vocals, guitar, piano, organ
- Grant McLennan – vocals, bass guitar

Additional musicians

- Dennis Cantwell – drums

Production

- Producer, Engineer – Jon Davis
- Photography – Paul Nearhos
- Art Direction – Allan Martin
