= She's a Girl and I'm a Man =

1991 song by Lloyd Cole

Single by Lloyd Cole

from the album Don't Get Weird on Me Babe
- B-side: "Weird on Me"
- Released: 19 August 1991
- Length: 4:15
- Label: Polydor; Capitol (US)
- Songwriters: Lloyd Cole; Robert Quine
- Producers: Lloyd Cole; Fred Maher; Paul Hardiman

Lloyd Cole singles chronology
"Downtown" (1990)	"She's a Girl and I'm a Man" (1991)	"Weeping Wine" (1991)

"She's a Girl and I'm a Man" is a song by English singer, songwriter and musician Lloyd Cole, released on 19 August 1991 as the lead single from his second studio album, Don't Get Weird on Me Babe (1991). The song was written by Cole and Robert Quine, and produced by Cole, Fred Maher and Paul Hardiman. It peaked at number 55 in the UK Singles Chart and remained in the top 75 for two weeks. In the US, it reached number 7 on the Billboard Modern Rock Tracks chart.

== Background ==
"She's a Girl and I'm a Man" was originally recorded in the studio for use as a potential B-side. Inspired by T-Rex, Cole recalled to Hearsay Magazine in 2000, "It was knocked out in the studio as a B-side idea. We'd been playing a T-Rex song earlier that day, not dissimilar to the way the Smiths came up with 'Panic' after, rumour has it, playing around with 'Metal Guru' which is only one chord different." When Cole presented Don't Get Weird on Me Babe to Polydor, the head of the label, David Munns, was enthusiastic about "She's a Girl and I'm a Man" and felt it would be a hit. On the strength of the song, the label resigned Cole to their roster.

The original version of the song did not finish with the chorus, so Polydor encouraged Cole to return to the studio in attempt to improve its commercial potential. He recalled in 2009, "We went back into the studio to edit, and re-record, to make the song the way it should always have been. It was not easy and the 'You wouldn't understand him, Sister it's a man thing' which we inserted to hide the edit is not one of my finest moments. Still, Polydor were happy and it was the first single." When released, the single did not reach Polydor's commercial expectations and Cole recalled how there was "no Plan B". The original version of the song was included on Cole's 2009 compilation Cleaning Out the Ashtrays (Collected B-Sides & Rarities 1989-2006).

The song drew some criticism for what some saw as sexist lyrics. In 2016, Cole told The Mouth Magazine, "The only potentially sexist aspect is that the narrator refers to the female character as 'a girl' and not 'a woman'. That was written that way purely because it sounded better. Really, if you wanted to one could argue that there's an element of sexism to putting women on a pedestal and worshipping them. That's certainly the type of song that 'She's a Girl and I'm a Man' was. It's very clear that the narrator is in love with her and still somewhat aghast that she's in love with him. He's still dizzy from thinking that a creature as beautiful as she could fall for somebody like him."

== Critical reception ==
Upon its release as a single, Tony Parsons of The Daily Telegraph picked "She's a Girl and I'm a Man" as the newspaper's "single of the week", describing it as a "sour love song" which features "a crunching white-knuckled riff and great lines like 'She's got to be the stupidest girl I've ever seen'". The Kilmarnock Standard praised the song as "a slice of pure, laconic pop" and added that Quine's "indomitable guitar playing could drive the new single to a lofty chart placing".

Ian Gittins of Melody Maker stated, "I always thought Cole's studious dullard reputation somewhat undeserved but lines like, 'He thought women and drinking would make a man out of him, so he left his studies,' aren't going to reduce his notoriety for penning pained, self-conscious autobiography. He does spit out the line, 'She's got to be the stupidest girl I've ever seen' with a fair lorryload of feeling, mind." Adam Porter of the Evening Standard was critical, describing it as "a rather silly and weak song" with a title that "British people will be very embarrassed by and rightly so". He added, "His self-enforced exile to New York has served to make him more sloppy and self-indulgent than before. Bit disappointing for his eager Metropolite fans."

In the US, Larry Flick of Billboard wrote that Cole's "expressive vocals drive this dynamic, hook-driven tune". He noted the song's "strong hook", "ringing guitar", "catchy chorus" and "wild production", and felt it could achieve interest from both "modern rockers and pop programmers".

== Track listing ==
- 7–inch and cassette single (UK and Europe) and CD single (Australia)
1. "She's a Girl and I'm a Man" – 4:15
2. "Weird on Me" – 3:41
- 12–inch single (UK and Europe), CD single (UK, Europe and US) and 12-inch promotional single (US)
1. "She's a Girl and I'm a Man" – 4:15
2. "Weird on Me" – 3:41
3. "Children of the Revolution" – 2:43
- CD promotional single (US)
1. "She's a Girl and I'm a Man" – 4:15

== Personnel ==
Credits are adapted from the Don't Get Weird on Me Babe CD album liner notes and the UK CD single.

"She's a Girl and I'm a Man"

- Lloyd Cole – vocals, Hammond organ, guitars
- Robert Quine – guitars
- Blair Cowan – Hammond organ
- Matthew Sweet – bass
- Fred Maher – drums

Production

- Lloyd Cole – producer
- Fred Maher – producer
- Paul Hardiman – producer, engineer
- Tim Young – mastering

Other

- Matthew Donaldson – photography

== Charts ==
Chart (1991–92)	Peak position
Australia (ARIA)	149
Europe (European Hit Radio)	29
Sweden (Sverigetopplistan)	27
UK Singles (OCC)	55
UK Airplay (Music Week)	33
US Billboard Modern Rock Tracks	7
