= Internal affairs doctrine =

The internal affairs doctrine is a choice of law rule in corporate law. Simply stated, it provides that the "internal affairs" of a corporation (e.g. conflicts between shareholders and management figures such as the board of directors and corporate officers) will be governed by the corporate statutes and case law of the state in which the corporation is incorporated, sometimes referred to as the lex incorporationis.

== Practical effects of the doctrine ==
The internal affairs doctrine ensures that such issues as voting rights of shareholders, distributions of dividends and corporate property, and the fiduciary obligations of management are all determined in accordance with the law of the state in which the company is incorporated. On the other hand, the "external affairs" of a corporation, such as labor and employment issues and tax liability, are typically governed by the law of the state in which the corporation is doing business. Some issues and activities, such as contracts, mergers and acquisitions, and sales of securities to third parties, may be governed both by the laws of the state of incorporation and by the laws of the state in which the transaction takes place, and in some cases, by federal law as well (for example, United States securities law and antitrust law).

== Relation to federalism ==
In the United States, each state has the power to set its own corporate law. Because of this, and the fact that the internal affairs doctrine has been used by courts to allow application of the lex incorporationis, this has created a competitive market for incorporations among the states. Several states have taken advantage of this situation by becoming corporate havens, particularly Delaware and Nevada. Likewise, many jurisdictions apply the internal affairs doctrine internationally, which has permitted offshore financial centres to flourish.

== Exceptions ==
A few states, like California, narrowly apply the internal affairs doctrine. California broadly applies the public policy exception to the internal affairs doctrine, meaning that it will not defer to the law of the state of incorporation whenever that law contradicts its own domestic regulatory schemes that were intended to serve broad public interests as distinguished from the "more narrow interests of a corporation's shareholders". Thus, California does not defer to Delaware law with respect to the enforcement of California's statutes against insider trading.

California has also adopted the "pseudo-foreign corporation doctrine", in which it refuses to treat a foreign corporation as such "because most of its owners and operations are physically located within the state".

== See also ==
- United States corporate law
- Delaware corporation
- Nevada corporation
