= Far Out Corporation =

Australian rock band

- Origin: Brisbane, Queensland, Australia
- Genres: Rock
- Years active: 1997–2000
- Label: Polydor
- Past members: Ian Haug; Ross MacLennan; Grant McLennan; Adele Pickvance

Far Out Corporation were an Australian rock band formed in Brisbane, Queensland in November 1997. They were led by singer-guitarist Grant McLennan, formerly in The Go-Betweens. McLennan started the group with Ross MacLennan (no relation) on drums (ex-Turtlebox), bass player Adele Pickvance (from Davey Graney Band) and Powderfinger's guitarist Ian Haug. It was a side project for most of its members, other than Ross MacLennan, as they were in other bands which were in hiatus. The group's name is a reference to the rock supergroup, Far Corporation.

In November 1997 McLennan was asked to provide an ambient audio track for a music-arts project, Occiput Hammerings, held at Brisbane's Metro Arts Theatre. Australian musicologist, Ian McFarlane, described them as a "conceptual art group with a pop orientation." Far Out Corporation was initially a one-off group to fulfil the commission and performed live at one of the six nights of the Occiput Hammerings display early in 1998. The group then continued to gig at various Brisbane venues. In October 1998 they released their first and only album, FOC, which is an initialism of their name. It was produced by Tim Whitten and Far Out Corporation. McFarlane felt the album "successfully blended a pop sensibility with a more cerebral orientation (reminiscent of Underground Lovers, New Order or Velvet Underground)." It provided the CD single, "Don't Blame the Beam". In late 1999 The Go-Betweens reformed and McLennan brought Pickvance into a new Go-Betweens line-up; Far Out Corporation were disbanded by 2000. On 6 May 2006 Grant McLennan died.

== Related projects ==
- In 2005, when Powderfinger took an extended hiatus, Ian Haug recalled upon Far Out Corporation drummer Ross MacLennan to form a new side project, The Predators with fellow Powderfinger member, bassist John Collins and former Powderfinger drummer Steven Bishop as the group's front man.
- As a tribute to McLennan, Triple J put together a collection of songs by McLennan performed by various Australia musicians which included Ian Haug. This was recorded in late 2006 and released in June 2007.

== Discography ==
=== Albums ===
Title	Details
FOC	Released: 26 October 1998; Label: Polydor (537 977-2); Format: CD
