= Watershed (Grant McLennan album) =

Studio album by Grant McLennan
- Released: 1991
- Recorded: September and October 1990
- Studios: Paradise, Chinese Laundry, Sydney
- Genre: Alternative rock
- Length: 47:23
- Labels: White Label (Mushroom) (Australia), Beggars Banquet (Europe)
- Producer: Dave Dobbyn

Grant McLennan chronology
Watershed (1991)	Fireboy (1992)

Watershed is the debut solo album by Grant McLennan, founding member of the Go-Betweens released under the name G. W. McLennan. The album was recorded nine months after the Go-Betweens called it quits and was released in 1991.

The album featured contributions by singer-songwriters Paul Kelly and Dave Dobbyn, ex-Go-Between Amanda Brown, and Phil Kakulas of Blackeyed Susans. The album peaked at No. 96 on the Australian album charts.

Singles from the album were "Haven't I Been a Fool" (Europe only), "When Word Gets Around" and "Easy Come Easy Go".

== Critical reception ==
Professional ratings
Review scores
Source	Rating
AllMusic	4.5/5 stars
Calgary Herald	C−
Robert Christgau	A−

Robert Christgau noted that "the synthy guitar and hot drum programming put welcome glitz and steel into his romantic verse." Musicologist Ian McFarlane said it was an "ambitious and highly personalised collection of songs charted McLennan's emotions in the wake of The Go-Betweens' break-up... [it] revealed McLennan to be, in turns, the introspective singer/songwriter or the carefree and gregarious performer."

Melody Maker said, "People bleat on about Bobby Dylan, but it's been a good 16 years since [he] delivered anything as evocative as the choice moments on this record. GW stands in the shadow of a volcano singing his blessed heart out. Indeed, this some of the loveliest literate pop music you've heard."

== Track listing ==
All tracks written by Grant McLennan.

Side A

1. "When Word Gets Around" – 4:33
2. "Haven't I Been a Fool" – 3:23
3. "Haunted House" – 3:00
4. "Stones for You" – 3:20
5. "Easy Come Easy Go" – 4:00
6. "Black Mule" – 4:45

Side B

1. "Putting the Wheels Back On" – 4:15
2. "You Can't Have Everything" – 3:09
3. "Sally's Revolution" – 3:57
4. "Broadway Bride" – 3:42
5. "Just Get That Straight" – 3:17
6. "Dream About Tomorrow" – 5:57

== Personnel ==
- Grant McLennan – guitars, vocals
- Paul Kelly
- Amanda Brown
- Dave Dobbyn – guitars, keyboards
- Huey Benjamin
- Ian Belton – bass
- James Cruickshank
- Kenny Davis Jnr
- "Diamond Jim" Elliott
- Phil Hall
- Phil Kakulas
- Francine McDougall
- Astrid Munday
- Sarah Peet
- Stephen Philip
- Kit Quarry
- Tim Rollinson – guitar
- Kathy Wemyss

== Charts ==
Chart performance for Watershed
Chart (1991)	Peak position
Australian Albums (ARIA)	96
