= First Class CW Operators' Club =

The First Class CW Operators' Club (usually known by the abbreviation FOC) is a club for amateur radio operators who regularly make use of Morse code.

The club originated in the United Kingdom and is still headquartered there but has members all over the world. Membership is by invitation only.

Many FOC members are prominent in the world of DXpeditions and amateur radio contesting, or are known for their skill in chasing DX. Members must be able to operate Morse code at not less than 25 words per minute. The club has an active social programme and many members engage in extensive travel to meet other members in person.
