= Love Story (Lloyd Cole album) =

Studio album by Lloyd Cole
- Released: 1995
- Genre: Pop
- Length: 44:02
- Labels: Fontana; Rykodisc

Lloyd Cole chronology
Bad Vibes (1993)	Love Story (1995)	Music in a Foreign Language (2003)

Love Story is the fourth solo studio album by the English musician Lloyd Cole, released in 1995. Cole supported the album with UK and North American tours.

The album peaked at No. 27 on the UK Albums Chart. The first single was "Like Lovers Do". "Sentimental Fool" and "Baby" were also released.

== Production ==
Recorded in New York City, the album was produced by Cole and Stephen Street, among others. Cole considered the album to be an example of what he does best, rather than another attempt to reinvent himself. Robert Quine and Neil Clark played guitar on the album. Fred Maher played drums. "Trigger Happy" is about getting older.

== Critical reception ==
Professional ratings
Review scores
Source	Rating
AllMusic	3/5 stars
Calgary Herald	3.5/5 stars
The Encyclopedia of Popular Music	3/5 stars
The Guardian	2/5 stars
MusicHound Rock: The Essential Album Guide	2/5 stars
NME	4/10
(The New) Rolling Stone Album Guide	3/5 stars
Martin C. Strong	5/10

Trouser Press noted that "there's certainly nothing lacking in the spare, well-crafted songwriting or Cole's frequently beauteous (and ever-breaking) shaggy-dog voice." The Guardian opined that the album "passes in a comfy blur, only the melancholy 'Baby' making much impression." The Chicago Tribune determined that "the record's stripped-down arrangements, built around Cole's acoustic guitar, focus attention on how economical his songwriting has become over the years."

The Irish Times concluded that Cole "seems to have regained the immediacy and simplicity which made him an icon of the bedsit set, and which put him right up there with Morrissey in the hearts of many thinking teens." The Calgary Herald deemed Cole "a British Leonard Cohen in soft-soled shoes." The Ottawa Citizen stated that "'Sentimental Fool', 'Love Ruins Everything' and 'Trigger Happy' are infectious, timeless pop with a hint of irony."

AllMusic called the album "melodic folk-rock" that presents a "negative world-view." Mark Beaumont of NME considered Love Story to be Cole "stripped down" which, despite "some moments", is "not robust stuff" but largely "one man and his orchestra's trawl through the lite romance of familee life".

== Track listing ==
Love Story track listing
No.	Title	Length
1.	"Trigger Happy"	3:01
2.	"Sentimental Fool"	3:24
3.	"I Didn't Know That You Cared"	4:11
4.	"Love Ruins Everything"	3:20
5.	"Baby"	3:57
6.	"Be There"	4:48
7.	"Unhappy Song"	3:41
8.	"Like Lovers Do"	3:59
9.	"Happy for You"	3:50
10.	"Traffic"	2:50
11.	"Let's Get Lost"	2:02
12.	"For Crying Out Loud"	4:59
Total length:		44:02

== Charts ==
Chart performance for Love Story
Chart (1995)	Peak position
European Albums (Eurotipsheet)	32
Swedish Albums (Sverigetopplistan)	9
UK Albums (Official Charts)	27
Scottish Albums (Official Charts)	42
