= Grant McLennan =

Australian musician (1958–2006)

- McLennan in 1994

Background information
- Born: Grant William McLennan; 12 February 1958; Rockhampton, Queensland, Australia
- Died: 6 May 2006 (aged 48) Brisbane, Queensland, Australia
- Genres: Rock, alternative rock
- Occupations: Musician, songwriter, singer
- Instruments: Vocals, guitar, percussion, bass guitar
- Years active: 1977–2006
- Labels: Mushroom, Postcard, Rough Trade, Beggars Banquet, Atlantic

Grant William McLennan (12 February 1958 – 6 May 2006) was an Australian alternative rock singer-songwriter-guitarist. He co-founded the Go-Betweens (1977–89, 2000–06) with Robert Forster in Brisbane in 1977 and issued four solo albums: Watershed (1991), Fireboy (1992), Horsebreaker Star (1994) and In Your Bright Ray (1997). He collaborated with other artists on side projects. In May 2001, the Australasian Performing Right Association called his "Cattle and Cane" (1983) one of its top 30 Australian songs of all time.

== Early life ==
Grant William McLennan was born on 12 February 1958 in Rockhampton, Queensland. His father was a general practitioner, and McLennan grew up with a younger brother and sister. After the death of their father, when McLennan was four years old, his family moved to Cairns. He spent five years at the Anglican Church Grammar School in Brisbane as a boarder. His mother remarried, and the family then relocated to a cattle station in central Far North Queensland.

McLennan's songs, which often evoke the impressions and imagery of the regional background of his childhood, include "Cattle and Cane", "Unkind and Unwise", "Dusty in Here" (about his father), "Boundary Rider" and "Bye Bye Pride".

In 1976, McLennan began a Bachelor of Arts degree at the University of Queensland. Joh Bjelke-Petersen was Premier of Queensland at the time, and McLennan was arrested in a student protest against aspects of that government's conservative policies.

== Career ==
=== 1977–1990: Go-Betweens ===
In 1977, McLennan met Robert Forster at university. Forster encouraged him to learn bass guitar – McLennan had no musical training – and to form an alternative rock band, the Go-Betweens, in Brisbane. For several months they used a succession of interim drummers, with McLennan on bass guitar and Forster on lead guitar and lead vocals. The group released their first single in September 1978, "Lee Remick", which was written by Forster.

During the group's initial period, Forster provided most of the songwriting and lead vocals. In November 1979, the Go-Betweens' McLennan and Forster travelled to England and then to Scotland, where they recorded new material, including their third single, "I Need Two Heads" (June 1980). By the time it appeared, they had returned to Australia. As McLennan's own distinctive compositional style developed, the two shared lead vocal duties almost equally. For Go-Betweens releases from about 1980 forward, some songs were credited to "Forster/McLennan", although the two generally wrote separately, each singing their own compositions.

In November 1981, the Go-Betweens issued their debut album, Send Me a Lullaby, with Lindy Morrison as their permanent drummer. Aside from lead vocals and bass guitar McLennan also provides lead guitar for three of its eight tracks – he wrote four tracks and co-wrote one with Forster. McLennan told Gavin Sawford of Rave magazine, in April 1996, that "[it] is to me an inauspicious debut... if I'd heard that and I wasn't in the band, I think my comment would have been 'What the fuck is going on here.' There's great melodies but then there's changes which to this day I can't work out. There's lyrics to this day which I don't understand and when I actually summon up enough courage to get to the microphone, I sound like a choirboy with a mouthful of fruitcake."

In 1982, they relocated to London and recorded new material, also during that year McLennan was part of a side project, Tuff Monks, with Forster and Morrison joined by label mates, Nick Cave, Mick Harvey and Rowland S. Howard of the Birthday Party. The group released only a single, "After the Fireworks", on Missing Link Records. In late 1983 the Go-Betweens added Robert Vickers on bass guitar – which allowed McLennan to shift to lead guitar.

Late in 1986, Amanda Brown joined on oboe, violin, guitar, keyboards and backing vocals. McLennan and Brown were soon in a romantic relationship. Many of McLennan's new lyrics were about this relationship. John Willsteed replaced Vickers on bass guitar in November 1987.

After recording six albums the Go-Betweens disbanded in December 1989. McLennan and Forster had made tentative plans to form an acoustic duo together. When McLennan told Brown, she ended their relationship.

McLennan and Forster each pursued solo careers while Brown and Morrison formed Cleopatra Wong in 1991.

McLennan and Forster reformed The Go-Betweens in 2000, and recorded three more studio albums. Their last one, Oceans Apart (October 2005), won the band their first ARIA Award: for Best Adult Contemporary Album at the 2005 ceremony. Their live album, That Striped Sunlight Sound (2006), was nominated for Best Music DVD at the 2006 awards.

=== 1990–2003: Jack Frost, Far Out Corporation and solo work ===
In 1990, on lead vocals, bass guitar, lead guitar and keyboards, McLennan formed the rock band Jack Frost in Sydney with the Church's front man, Steve Kilbey on lead vocals, bass guitar, lead guitar, keyboards and drums. The group released a self-titled album in 1991 and the pair resumed the collaboration in 1995 for a second album, Snow Job.

Also in 1990, McLennan produced the debut single "On and On" for Sydney-based duo Club Hoy.

In June 1991, McLennan released his debut solo album Watershed under the name G.W. McLennan, which was produced by Dave Dobbyn (DD Smash) on Mushroom Records' White Records label. Australian musicologist Ian McFarlane felt it was an "ambitious and highly personalised collection of songs charted McLennan's emotions in the wake of The Go-Betweens' break-up... [it] revealed McLennan to be, in turns, the introspective singer/songwriter or the carefree and gregarious performer." AllMusic's Norm Elrod noticed that McLennan "isn't the most talented singer; his voice is a bit plain, and his range somewhat limited. He isn't the most gifted guitarist; his playing sometimes amounts to basic acoustic strums. He is, however, a truly exceptional artist who, in the spirit of Lloyd Cole, crafts moments of brilliance to fit his limitations."

In November 1992, McLennan released the album Fireboy, produced by Dobbyn again. McFarlane compared it with his previous one and found it was "an even more melancholy set of songs that boasted fuller (though never obtrusive) arrangements". Ned Raggett of AllMusic felt it "finds the musician in excellent form, with a baker's dozen worth of songs that won't challenge preconceptions, but do make for a great listen all around" with "sweetly sparkling, sometimes barbed, numbers". Robert Christgau, an American journalist, preferred the tracks "The Dark Side of Town", "Riddle in the Rain" and "Whose Side Are You On?", which were "living tunes in studio-rock amber". During 1993 he toured Australia with a backing band comprising Michael Barclay on drums, Pedro Bull on keyboards (both ex-ex-Paul Kelly and the Messengers), Maurice Frawley on guitar (ex-Paul Kelly and the Dots) and Phil Kakulas on bass guitar (ex-Blackeyed Susans).

In December 1994, McLennan released Horsebreaker Star. It was recorded in Athens, Georgia with American session musicians and was produced by John Keane (R.E.M., Indigo Girls, Vic Chesnutt). Christgau found it was McLennan's "most consistently catchy solo album" providing "30 snapshots of a resigned romantic" while "unrolling tune after sweet, simple-seeming tune". McFarlane praised "its wide-screen outlook, the album shifted from country rock to bright acoustic pop with a great deal of optimism and passion". Raggett opined that it was "more of a country/Southern rock bent...his ear for focused, sharp lyrical portraits of life and love, paired with his ever-striking crisp singing style, continues to lead the way".

In September 1997, McLennan released In Your Bright Ray, with Wayne Connolly producing. AllMusic's Jack Rabid found it "returns him to his more well-trodden ground... [and] is as warm and soft as a cake out of the oven, a just-washed blanket, and an Eskimo coat".

In November 1997, he formed Far Out Corporation with Ian Haug, Ross McLennan and Adele Pickvance. McFarlane described them as a "conceptual art group with a pop orientation". They issued their sole album FOC in October 1998, which was co-produced by Tim Whitten with the group.

=== 2006: Death ===
McLennan died at his Brisbane home on 6 May 2006, aged 48, from a heart attack. He was preparing for a party to celebrate with his fiancée, Emma Pursey; he complained of feeling unwell, and he went upstairs to rest. He was found dead soon after by Pursey, his flatmate and friends. Over 1,000 people attended his funeral, including musicians Dave Dobbyn, Bernard Fanning, Ian Haug, Lindy Morrison, Dave McCormack, Steve Kilbey, Paul Kelly and Ed Kuepper.

Following McLennan's death, the Queensland Government established the Grant McLennan Lifetime Achievement Award, presented at the Queensland Music Awards.

== Discography ==
=== Albums ===
Title	Details	Peak chart positions
Title	Details	AUS
Watershed	Released: June 1991; Label: White Label (D 30547); Format: CD, LP, cassette	96
Fireboy	Released: November 1992; Label: White Label (D 30841); Format: CD, cassette	—
Horsebreaker Star	Released: December 1994; Label: Concubine (ALBUM004); Format: 2×CD, cassette	—
In Your Bright Ray	Released: September 1997; Label: Cortex (CTX084CD ); Format: CD	—

=== Compilation albums ===
Title	Details
Intermission (with Robert Forster)	Released: 2007; Label: EMI (094639544424); Format: 2x CD, digital download

=== Extended plays ===
Title	Details
Surround Me	Released: 1992; Label: White Label Records (D11237); Format: CD, Cassette

=== Charting singles ===
List of singles within the top 150, with selected chart positions
Title	Year	Chart positions
Title	Year	AUS
"Surround Me"	1993	122

== Awards ==
=== Queensland Music Awards ===
The Queensland Music Awards (previously known as Q Song Awards) celebrate Queensland, Australia's brightest emerging artists and established legends. In 2006, the inaugural year, McLennan won a Lifetime Achievement Award.
