= Delaware corporation =

Statute governing corporate law in Delaware

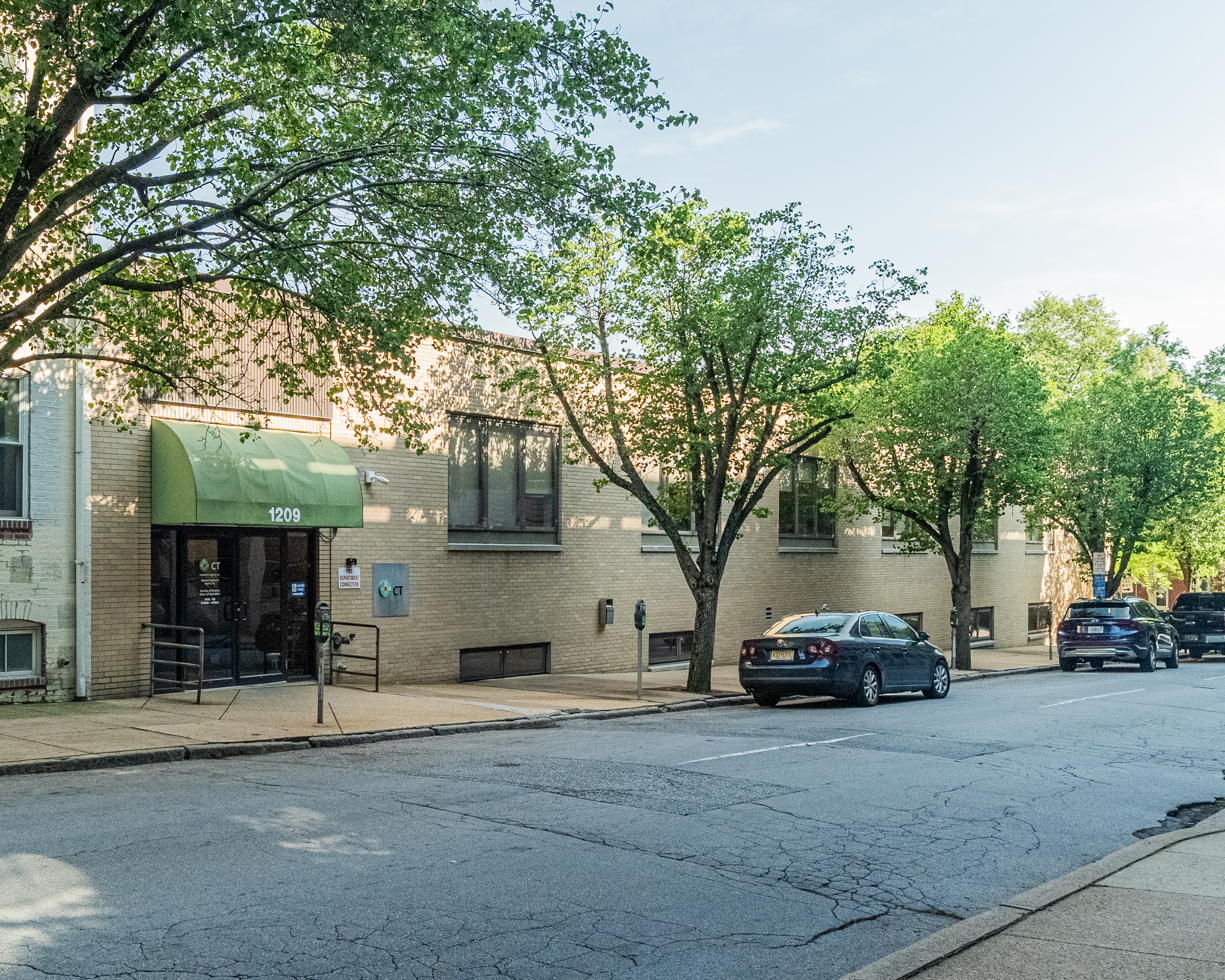
Corporation Trust Center, 1209 North Orange Street, Wilmington. In 2012, it was the registered agent address of at least 285,000 separate American and foreign businesses who operate or trade in the United States.

Corporations in the U.S. state of Delaware are regulated through the Delaware General Corporation Law (DGCL), officially the General Corporation Law of the State of Delaware (Title 8, Chapter 1 of the Delaware Code). The statute was adopted on March 10, 1899. Since the 1913 reforms in New Jersey under the governorship of Woodrow Wilson, Delaware has become the most prevalent jurisdiction in United States corporate law and has been described as the de facto corporate capital of the United States.

Delaware is considered a corporate haven because of its business-friendly corporate laws compared to most other U.S. states. 66% of the Fortune 500, including Walmart and Amazon (two of the world's largest companies by revenue) are incorporated (and therefore have their domiciles for service of process purposes) in the state. Over half of all publicly traded corporations listed in the New York Stock Exchange (including its owner, Intercontinental Exchange) are incorporated in Delaware.

The statute has been credited with reducing the tax burdens on Delaware residents as revenues from the statute provide two-fifths of the state's budget. It has also been criticized for facilitating tax dodging and money laundering by multinational corporations, and for providing safe haven to money launderers, kleptocratic foreign rulers, and human traffickers.

== History ==
Delaware acquired its status as a corporate haven in the early 20th century. Following the example of New Jersey, which enacted corporate-friendly laws at the end of the 19th century to attract businesses from New York, Delaware adopted on March 10, 1899, a general incorporation act aimed at attracting more businesses. The group that pushed for this legislation intended to establish a corporation that would sell services to other businesses incorporating in Delaware. Before the rise of general incorporation acts, forming a corporation required a special act of the state legislature. General incorporation allowed anyone to form a corporation by simply raising money and filing articles of incorporation with the state's Secretary of State.

As of 2015, the Delaware House of Representatives had the highest percentage of legislators without bachelor's degrees, 21%, out of any state legislatures. Thus, changes to the law are usually decided by the lawyers at the Corporation Law Council of the Delaware Bar and approved by the representatives.

== Other legal aspects ==
Because of the extensive experience of the Delaware courts, Delaware has a more well-developed body of case law than other states, which serves to give corporations and their counsel greater guidance on matters of corporate governance and transaction liability issues. Disputes over the internal affairs of Delaware corporations are usually filed in the Delaware Court of Chancery, which is a separate court of equity, as opposed to a court of law. Because it is a court of equity, there are no juries; its cases are heard by judges, called chancellors. Since 2018, the court has consisted of one chancellor and six vice-chancellors. The court is a trial court, with one chancellor hearing each case. Litigants may appeal final decisions of the Court of Chancery to the Delaware Supreme Court.

Delaware has also attracted major credit card banks because of its relaxed rules regarding interest. Many U.S. states have usury laws limiting the amount of interest a lender can charge. Federal law allows a national bank to "import" these laws from the state in which its principal office is located. Delaware (among others) has relatively relaxed interest laws, so several national banks have decided to locate their principal office in Delaware. National banks are, however, corporations formed under federal law, not Delaware law. A corporation formed under Delaware state law benefits from the relaxed interest rules to the extent it conducts business in Delaware, but is subject to restrictions of other states' laws if it conducts business in other states.

Pursuant to the "internal affairs doctrine", corporations which act in more than one state are subject only to the laws of their state of incorporation with regard to the regulation of the internal affairs of the corporation. As a result, Delaware corporations are subject almost exclusively to Delaware law, even when they do business in other states.

While most states require a for-profit corporation to have at least one director and two officers, Delaware laws do not have this restriction. All offices may be held by a single person who also can be the sole shareholder. The person, who does not need to be a U.S. citizen or resident, may also operate anonymously with only the listing agent through whom the company is registered named.

== Tax benefits and burdens ==
Delaware charges no income tax on corporations not operating within the state, so taking advantage of Delaware's other benefits does not result in taxation. At the same time, Delaware has a particularly aggressive tax on banks that locate in the state. However, in general, the state is viewed as a positive location for corporate tax purposes because favorable laws of incorporation allow companies to minimize corporate expenditures.

In addition, Delaware has used its position as the state of incorporation to generate revenue from its abandoned and unclaimed property laws. Under U.S. Supreme Court precedent, the state of incorporation gets to keep any abandoned and unclaimed property, such as uncashed checks and unredeemed gift certificates, if the corporation does not have information about the location of the owner of the property. Abandoned property provides Delaware with about half a billion dollars annually.

Delaware charges a franchise tax on the corporations incorporated in it. Franchise taxes in Delaware are higher than in most other states which typically get revenue from corporate income taxes on the portion of the corporation's business done in that state. Delaware's franchise taxes supply about one-fifth of its state revenue.

In February 2013, The Economist published an article on tax-friendly jurisdictions, commenting that Delaware stood for "Dollars and Euros Laundered And Washed At Reasonable Expense". Jeffrey W. Bullock, Delaware's Secretary of State, insists that the state has struck the right balance between curbing criminality and "paying deference to the millions of legitimate businesspeople who benefit" from hassle-free incorporation.

The state corporate law system, known locally as "the franchise", generates USD 2 billion a year for the state, covering 29% of the general revenue.

Delaware is one of 5 states in the U.S. that has no sales tax. This policy enables out-of-state shoppers to avoid paying sales tax in their own states by having items shipped to a Delaware address. It is common for consumers to cross state lines in order to avoid sales taxes on regular purchases, according to the International Consortium of Investigative Journalists (ICIJ).

== 2013 amendments ==
On June 30, 2013, Delaware Governor Jack Markell signed amendments to the Delaware General Corporation Law. The new legislation took effect on August 1, 2013, except for the ratification of the defective corporate acts amendment which took effect in 2014.

== Securities law ==
In 2020, the Delaware Supreme Court upheld a provision allowing companies to require in their certificates of incorporation all Securities Act of 1933 claims to be filed in federal court.

DGCL 203 is particularly known as an anti-takeover law.

== See also ==
- Nevada corporation
- 1899 in the United States
- Delaware corporate exodus (2024–present)
- Combined reporting
- Corporation
- Corporate haven
- Delaware Journal of Corporate Law
- Flag of convenience (business)
- Say on pay
- United Kingdom company law
