= Information Society discography =

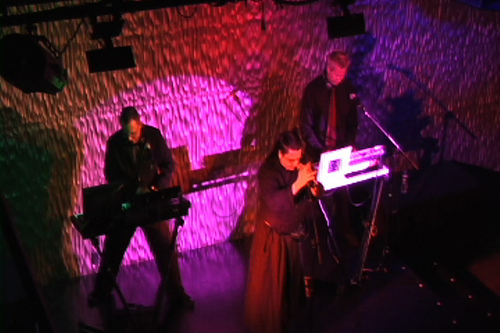
- Jim Cassidy, Kurt Harland, Paul Robb (2007)
- Studio albums: 7
- EPs: 6
- Live albums: 1
- Compilation albums: 7
- Singles: 21
- Video albums: 1
- Music videos: 19

The discography of Information Society, an American synth-pop/freestyle band founded by Kurt Harland and Paul Robb in 1982.

== Albums ==
=== Studio albums ===
List of studio albums, with selected details, chart positions, and certifications
Title	Details	Peak chart positions		Certifications
Title	Details	US	CAN	Certifications
Information Society	Released: 21 June 1988; Label: Tommy Boy, Reprise, Warner Bros.	25	41	RIAA: Gold
Hack	Released: 16 October 1990; Label: Tommy Boy, Reprise, Warner Bros.	77	—	
Peace and Love, Inc.	Released: 26 October 1992; Label: Tommy Boy, Reprise, Warner Bros.	—	—	
Don't Be Afraid	Released: 23 September 1997; Label: Cleopatra	—	—	
Synthesizer	Released: 1 September 2007; Label: Hakatak	—	—	
Hello World	Released: 23 September 2014; Label: Hakatak	—	—	
Orders of Magnitude	Released: 11 March 2016; Label: Hakatak	— (Note: 1. 10 on the Dance/Electronic Albums chart.)	—	
Oddfellows	Released: 6 August 2021; Label: Hakatak	"—" denotes a recording that did not chart or was not released in that territory.		

=== Live albums ===
- It Is Useless to Resist Us: Information Society Live (2013)

=== Compilation albums ===
- InSoc Recombinant (1999)
- strange haircuts // cardboard guitars // and computer samples (2001)
- Pure Energy (2004)
- Apocryphon: Electro Roots 1982–1985 (2008)
- Energize! Classic Remixes, Vol. 1 (2011)
- Engage! Classic Remixes, Vol. 2 (2014)
- Encode! Classic Remixes, Vol. 3 (2015)

=== Video albums ===
- It Is Useless to Resist Us: 25 Years of Information Society (2009)

== Extended plays ==
- The InSoc EP (1983)
- Creatures of Influence (1985)
- Oscillator (2007)
- Modulator (2009)
- Land of the Blind (2014)
- Brothers! Sisters! (2016)

== Singles ==
List of singles, with selected chart positions, showing year released and album name
Title	Year	Peak chart positions								Album
Title	Year	US Hot 100	US Alt.	US Dance	US R&B/Hip-Hop	CAN	NLD	IRE	UK	Album
"Running"	1985	—	—	10	—	—	—	—	—	Creatures of Influence
"What's on Your Mind (Pure Energy)"	1988	3	10	1	—	11	—	18	81	Information Society
"Walking Away"	1988	9	15	5	64	23	—	—	—	Information Society
"Repetition"	1989	76	—	—	—	—	—	—	—	Information Society
"Lay All Your Love on Me"	1989	83	—	23	—	—	—	—	—	Information Society
"Think"	1990	28	—	5	—	—	20	—	—	Hack
"How Long"	1991	—	—	20	—	—	—	—	—	Hack
"Peace & Love, Inc."	1992	—	—	10	—	—	—	—	—	Peace and Love, Inc.
"1,000,000 Watts of Love" (Japan only)	1992	—	—	—	—	—	—	—	—	Peace and Love, Inc.
"Going, Going, Gone" (US only)	1993	—	—	—	—	—	—	—	—	Peace and Love, Inc.
"Are Friends Electric?" (US promo)	1997	—	—	—	—	—	—	—	—	Don't Be Afraid
"What's on Your Mind (Pure Energy) '99" (US only)	1998	—	—	—	—	—	—	—	—	InSoc Recombinant
"Express Yourself" / "What's on Your Mind (Pure Energy) '99" (Brazil only)	1999	—	—	—	—	—	—	—	—	InSoc Recombinant
"Running '01" (US only)	2001	—	—	2	—	—	—	—	—	strange haircuts // cardboard guitars // and computer samples
"What's on Your Mind (Pure Energy) '01" (US only)	2001	—	—	4	—	—	—	—	—	strange haircuts // cardboard guitars // and computer samples
"What's on Your Mind (Pure Energy) '02" (Spain only)	2002	—	—	—	—	—	—	—	—	Non-album single
"Get Back"	2014	—	—	—	—	—	—	—	—	Hello World
"Land of the Blind"	2014	—	—	—	—	—	—	—	—	Hello World
"Nothing Prevails"	2018	—	—	—	—	—	—	—	—	Non-album singles
"Bennington"	2019	—	—	—	—	—	—	—	—	Non-album singles
"World Enough"	2019	—	—	—	—	—	—	—	—	Non-album singles
"—" denotes a recording that did not chart or was not released in that territory.

== Music videos ==
- Fall in Line (1983)
- What's on Your Mind (Pure Energy) (1988)
- Walking Away (1988)
- Repetition (1989)
- Think (1990)
- How Long (1991)
- Peace and Love, Inc (1992)
- I Like the Way You Werk It (2007)
- Great Big Disco World (2007)
- Me and My Rhythm Box (2014)
- Jonestown (2014)
- Where Were You (2014)
- The Prize (2014)
- Beautiful World (feat. Gerald V. Casale) (2014)
- Creatures of Light & Darkness (2014)
- Above and Below (2014)
- Let it Burn (2014)
- Land of the Blind (2014)
- Get Back (2014)
- Nothing Prevails (2018)
