= Strange haircuts // cardboard guitars // and computer samples =

strange haircuts // cardboard guitars // and computer samples

Greatest hits album by Information Society
- Released: April 24, 2001
- Recorded: 1984–1993
- Genre: Synth-pop; Europop
- Length: 71:07
- Label: Tommy Boy; Warner Bros.

Information Society chronology
InSoc Recombinant (1999)	strange haircuts // cardboard guitars // and computer samples (2001)	Pure Energy (2004)

Professional ratings
Review scores
Source	Rating
AllMusic	3/5 stars

strange haircuts // cardboard guitars // and computer samples is a greatest hits album by the electronic band Information Society.

== Track listing ==
1. "Running" – 7:41
2. "Walking Away" – 3:58
3. "Repetition" – 4:32
4. "Lay All Your Love on Me" (Metal Mix) – 6:48
5. "What's on Your Mind (Pure Energy)" – 4:33
6. "Think" – 3:54
7. "How Long" – 4:05
8. "Crybaby" – 5:10
9. "Peace & Love, Inc." – 5:00
10. "Going, Going, Gone" – 4:53
11. "Strength" – 5:10
12. "A Knife and a Fork/Think Tank" (The Massively Parallel Mix) – 7:06
13. "Running" (Victor Calderone Remix) – 4:31
14. "What's on Your Mind (Pure Energy 2001)" (Junior Vasquez Remix) – 3:46
