= Kurt Harland =

American singer-songwriter (born 1963)

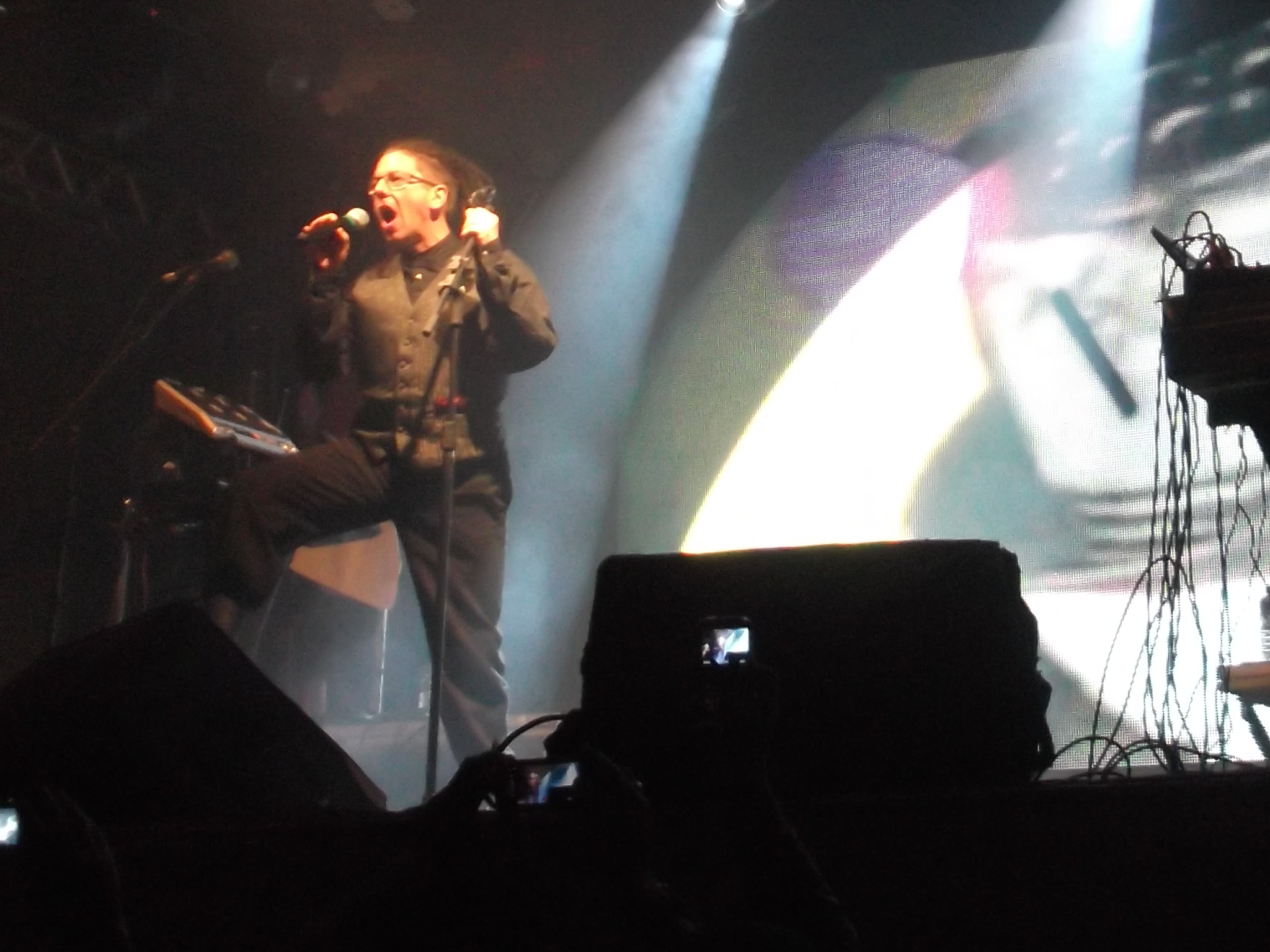
- Harland performing in 2012

Background information
- Also known as: Kurt Valaquen; Kurt Harland Valaquen; Kurt Larson
- Born: Kurt Harland Larson; January 25, 1963 (age 63)
- Origin: Minneapolis, Minnesota
- Genres: Synthpop, hi-NRG, electronic, freestyle
- Occupations: Singer, songwriter, record producer, game soundtrack composer, audio engineer
- Years active: 1982-present

Kurt Harland is an American singer, songwriter, and audio engineer. He is the lead singer of Information Society. He also works on video game scores, including two of the soundtracks for the Legacy of Kain video game series (Legacy of Kain: Soul Reaver and Soul Reaver 2 in collaboration with Jim Hedges).

== Personal life ==
Kurt Harland Larson was born on January 25, 1963 in Minneapolis, Minnesota. He lived in Minneapolis until he was 5, when he moved to New Brighton.

Kurt began learning piano at age 6 and took lessons on and off until age 19. He began singing in the school choirs and theater productions in 8th grade, which he continued through college. Between the ages of 14 and 19, he experimented with painting.

At age 18 he moved back into the city to attend college, in Saint Paul. From 1982 to 1988, he lived in South Minneapolis, except for a 6-month stay in Vienna, Austria.

He graduated from Irondale High School in 1981, and attended Macalester College in Saint Paul for a year before attending the University of Minnesota in 1982.

Kurt has stated he started performing and making music with Information Society at age 19 in 1982.

In 1988, he moved to New York City for 5 years before settling in San Francisco in 1993.

== Career ==
=== Information Society ===
In early concerts and albums, Harland was credited under the pseudonym "Kurt Valaquen", Valaquen taken from Tolkien, meaning child of light. After the band had achieved mainstream success, he began using his own middle name as his professional last name.

=== 1982–1990 ===
Formed in 1982, synthpop band Information Society achieved mainstream success for a time in the late eighties and early nineties. They are most widely known for their 1988 hit single "What's on Your Mind (Pure Energy)". The band's last major (top 40) charting release was "Think" in 1990, from the album Hack.

=== 1990–1997 ===
After the moderate success of Hack, the band released Peace and Love, Inc. in 1992. The album did not achieve much commercial success and failed to chart to a notable degree. MTV were reportedly opposed to playing the music video of the title track on its channel.

After Information Society broke up, Harland kept the rights to the name of the band and worked with Steven Seibold of Hate Dept.. The resulting album titled Don't Be Afraid, was released in 1997. The album resulted in a more industrial influenced sound, purportedly fulfilling the wishes of Harland in pursuing a darker approach that he had previously hoped to explore.

=== 1997–present ===
A 2004 episode of VH1's Bands Reunited, caused a brief controversy when Harland refused to appear in an Information Society reunion performance, despite apparently accepting the invitation on-camera by signing a copy of their first album. In an account of the incident written by Harland and available on his website, Harland disputes VH1's depiction of the events and his portrayal on the show, claiming that the show was edited to make it look as if he had accepted the invitation and then backed out of it.

In 2006, he turned the name back over to Paul Robb and James Cassidy, who reformed the band with a new singer. Harland cited family obligations and a demanding career in not returning full-time; he has since been involved nonetheless, performing at a few concerts, and is featured as a vocalist on their 2007 album Synthesizer. He later rejoined the band full-time, singing and writing for subsequent releases. These additional albums were Hello World in 2014 and Orders of Magnitude in 2016.

=== Video games ===
After 30 years as a full-time recording artist, Harland moved to San Francisco and began his career in video game audio engineering. Over the years he has been involved with eighteen different projects, notably six years with Crystal Dynamics and a stint at Electronic Arts.

Harland has worked on the following:

- 1995: Scooby-Doo Mystery — Sunsoft, Mega Drive
- 1995: X-Men 2: Clone Wars — Headgames / Sega, Mega Drive
- 1995: Ballz — PF.Magic, 3DO
- 1995: Nightmare Circus — Funcom Oslo / Sega, Mega Drive
- 1997: Gex: Enter the Gecko — Crystal Dynamics, PlayStation
- 1999: Legacy of Kain: Soul Reaver — Crystal Dynamics, PlayStation / Dreamcast / Windows
- 2001: Soul Reaver 2 — Crystal Dynamics, Windows / PlayStation 2
- 2003: Whiplash — Crystal Dynamics, PlayStation 2 / Xbox
- 2003: Legacy of Kain: Defiance — Crystal Dynamics, Windows / PlayStation 2 / Xbox
- 2005: The Godfather — Electronic Arts, PlayStation 2 / Xbox / PC
- 2005: Death Jr. – Backbone Entertainment, PSP
- 2006: Death Jr. II: Root of Evil – Backbone Entertainment, PSP
- 2007: Death Jr. and the Science Fair of Doom – Backbone Entertainment, Nintendo DS
- 2011: PlayStation Move Heroes – Nihilistic Software Inc., PlayStation 3 with PlayStation Move
- 2012: Resistance: Burning Skies – Nihilistic Software Inc., PlayStation Vita
- 2020: Ori and the Will of the Wisps – Moon Studios, Windows, Xbox One, Nintendo Switch, Xbox Series X|S

Four songs from Information Society's album Don't Be Afraid were also used in video games that had their soundtracks composed by Kurt Harland:

- Early versions of "Closing In" and "On the Outside" had been used in the 3DO version of Ballz.
- The instrumental track "Ozar Midrashim" would later be used as the intro theme of Legacy of Kain: Soul Reaver.
