= Pure Energy =

Pure Energy may refer to:

== Energy ==
- Pure Energy Services Ltd., owner of Canadian Sub-Surface oil field services, acquired by FMC Technologies
- Pure Energy, licensee of Rechargeable alkaline battery technology
- Pure Planet, a former energy company in England

== People ==
- Gary David, Filipino basketball player, nicknamed "Mr. Pure Energy"
- Gary Valenciano, Filipino singer, nicknamed "Mr. Pure Energy"

== Music ==
- Pure Energy (band), an American music group
- PureNRG, pronounced "pure energy", an American Christian band

=== Albums ===
- Pure Energy (Information Society album), a 2004 compilation
- Pure Energy 1996 album by Steve Marriott

=== Songs ===
- "What's On Your Mind (Pure Energy)", a 1988 song by Information Society
- "Pure Energy", 1985 song by Five Star written by Stedman Pearson
