= Pure Energy (Information Society album) =

Compilation album by Information Society
- Released: March 30, 2004
- Length: 79:46
- Label: Cleopatra

Information Society chronology
strange haircuts // cardboard guitars // and computer samples (2001)	Pure Energy (2004)	Oscillator (2007)

Pure Energy: The Very Best of Information Society is a compilation album by the electronic band Information Society. It is generally poorly regarded by band members. Released three years after their previous compilation, strange haircuts // cardboard guitars // and computer samples, lead singer Kurt Harland was not involved with production.

== Production ==
This album contains tracks from the albums Don't Be Afraid (done by Harland alone) and InSoc Recombinant (a remix album, again a solo work by Harland), along with different mixes of "Are 'Friends' Electric?" and "What's on Your Mind", and a cover version of a Madonna song (which had been made for Cleopatra's tribute album entitled Virgin Voices Vol. 1: A Tribute to Madonna).

The album was produced by Cleopatra Records from archived material without any involvement from the band. Despite being listed in the liner notes as the album's producer, singer Harland did not work on it, and did not know of it before it was released.

== Track listing ==
1. "What's on Your Mind (Pure Energy)" – 4:18
2. "Peace & Love, Inc." (Biokraft Mix) – 5:02
3. "Empty 3.0" – 8:34
4. "Closing In 2.0" – 8:13
5. "On the Outside 2.1" – 6:49
6. "Walking Away" (Leæther Strip Mix) – 5:01
7. "What's on Your Mind (Pure Energy)" (Effcee Mix) – 5:42
8. "Are 'Friends' Electric?" (Slightly Altered Version) – 4:57
9. "Going, Going, Gone" (Razed in Black Mix) – 4:58
10. "Express Yourself" – 5:01
11. "Ozar Midrashim 1.1" – 6:54
12. "Seek 300 2.11" – 4:36
13. "The Ridge 1.1" – 9:41

== Band reaction ==
Paul Robb says this is "not an Information Society record" and "an insult to both the band and the fans". He also detested the cover art, calling it "dreadful".

Despite refusing to "endorse or un-endorse" it, Harland expressed a strong dislike regarding the cover art, for being poorly done and for depicting him bearing a firearm.

The band has referred to it in their MySpace blog as "that horrible Cleopatra abomination".
