= American Psycho (soundtrack) =

American Psycho: Music from the Controversial Motion Picture

Soundtrack album by various artists
- Released: April 4, 2000
- Recorded: 1980s, 1999-2000
- Length: 58:08
- Label: Koch

American Psycho: Music from the Controversial Motion Picture is the soundtrack to the 2000 film American Psycho directed by Mary Harron. The soundtrack featured music from the 1980s performed by artists such as David Bowie, Huey Lewis, Eric B. & Rakim, the Cure, among several others. The musical selections were inspired from the characteristics of Patrick Bateman (played by Christian Bale) and also authentic to the film's setting as Harron wanted it to set the film's tone. Velvet Underground co-founder John Cale's film score was also featured in the album subtitled as "monologues". The album was distributed by Koch Records on April 4, 2000. Despite the positive reception, the soundtrack was also controversial in regard to music licensing, due to the film's violent content.

== Critical reception ==
Derrick Mathis, in his review for AllMusic, added that the "loud, ham-fisted goth rock" cinematically illustrated the nature of Bateman and also felt that it "holds up as fresh as anything out today." In a negative review, Margaret Moser of The Austin Chronicle assigned oneand-a-half-star and wrote "Somewhere out there is a killer Eighties soundtrack waiting to be made, but American Psycho just doesn't cut it." Shaurya Thapa and Stephen Barker of Screen Rant summarized "Each song in the soundtrack has a distinct role in the movie, reflecting different scenes and revealing aspects of Patrick Bateman's personality."

== Controversy ==
The Huey Lewis and the News' "Hip to Be Square" was featured in the film in a sequence where Bateman kills Paul Allen (played by Jared Leto) and the song is played in the background. However, it was not included in the soundtrack album that resulted in Koch Records forcing to recall approximately 100,000 copies of the album.

Koch Records' president Bob Frank claimed that the removal was due to Lewis objecting to the film's violence, but Lewis' manager Bob Brown claimed that the song was included in the album without their permission, which he speculated was a publicity stunt.

In a later interview, Lewis dismissed Frank's claims being "completely made up". Lewis would go on to parody this scene in a Funny or Die sketch with Weird Al. Lewis playing the parody role of Patrick Bateman, leading to more credibility that Lewis didn't appose the violence of the scene.

== Track listing ==
American Psycho: Music from the Controversial Motion Picture track listing
No.	Title	Writer(s)	Artist(s)	Length
1.	"You Spin Me Round (Like a Record)" (Dead or Alive cover)	Pete Burns; Steve Coy; Wayne Hussey; Tim Lever; Mike Percy	Dope	2:43
2.	"Monologue 1"	Cale	John Cale	0:38
3.	"Something in the Air" (American Psycho Remix)	Bowie; Reeves Gabrels	David Bowie	6:01
4.	"Watching Me Fall" (Underdog Remix)	Robert Smith	The Cure	7:42
5.	"True Faith"	Gillian Gilbert; Stephen Hague; Peter Hook; Stephen Morris; Bernard Sumner	New Order	5:53
6.	"Monologue 2"	Cale	John Cale	0:30
7.	"Trouble"	Ash	Daniel Ash	4:15
8.	"Paid in Full" (Coldcut Remix)	Eric Barrier; Rakim Allah	Eric B. & Rakim	7:08
9.	"Who Feelin' It?" (Philip's Psycho Mix)	Chris Frantz; Tina Weymouth	Tom Tom Club	4:52
10.	"Monologue 3"	Mynarski	M.J. Mynarski	1:19
11.	"What's on Your Mind" (Pure Energy Mix)	Paul Robb; Kurt Harland	Information Society	4:35
12.	"Pump Up the Volume"	Martyn Young; Steve Young	MARRS	4:06
13.	"Paid in Full" (Remix)	Barrier; Allah	The Racket	3:06
14.	"Monologue 4"			1:17
15.	"Hip to Be Square"	Bill Gibson; Sean Hopper; Huey Lewis	Huey Lewis and the News	4:03
Total length:				58:08
