= Information Society (album) =

Studio album by Information Society
- Released: June 21, 1988
- Recorded: Platinum Island (New York City); Nicollet (Minneapolis)
- Genres: Electropop; synth-pop
- Length: 43:42
- Labels: Tommy Boy; Reprise
- Producers: Fred Maher; Paul Robb

Information Society chronology
Creatures of Influence (1984)	Information Society (1988)	Hack (1990)

Singles from Information Society
- 1. "What's on Your Mind (Pure Energy)" Released: April 26, 1988; 2. "Walking Away" Released: 1988; 3. "Repetition" Released: 1989; 4. "Lay All Your Love on Me" Released: 1989

Information Society is the debut studio album by American synth-pop band Information Society, released on June 21, 1988, by Tommy Boy Records and Reprise Records. It was the band's first release under a major label, after two independently released extended plays. The album was certified gold by the Recording Industry Association of America (RIAA) on December 6, 1988, denoting shipments in excess of 500,000 copies in the United States. Four singles were released from the album, including "What's on Your Mind (Pure Energy)", the group's most commercially successful single to date. It was one of the few albums released in the CD+G format.

== Production ==
The album's CD+G content was notable, as very few albums included such features at the time. As the CD+G format never caught on and compatible players are difficult to find, the whole content was also made available on the band's website. "What's on Your Mind (Pure Energy)" and "Walking Away" were used in a sampler disc bundled with the Sega CD to showcase the console's CD+G capability. The sampler disc, which included "What's on Your Mind (Pure Energy)" and "Walking Away," featured CD+G content with the same graphics as the album.

According to the CD+G notes, instruments used in the production of this album include: Akai S-900 sampler, E-MU SP-12 Drum Machine, Prophet 2002 Sampler (X2), Yamaha TX Rack Module (X8), Moog Minimoog Synthesizer, Roland Super Jupiter Synth (X3), Roland JX-3P Synth, Roland S-50 Synth. This album was recorded onto floppy disk via Voyetra Technology's "Sequencer Plus MK III" MIDI sequencer software in the summer of 1987. It was transferred to 48-track analog tape in autumn 1987, at which time vocals were added. The 48-track was then mixed down to a stereo master in winter 1987–1988.

== Reception ==
Professional ratings
Review scores
Source	Rating
AllMusic	4.5/5 stars
The Rolling Stone Album Guide	3.5/5 stars

John Bush of AllMusic noted "an infectious update of the classic synth-pop most famous earlier in the decade", albeit with "elements of industrial dance and hip-hop". Bush concluded, "All in all, it's a much better album than expected from the group many dismissed as mere one-hit wonders." Trouser Press critic Ira Robbins was less favorable, observing "shallow and poorly sung electro-pop" that resembles "a lighter variation on Ministry's early records". Robbins noted a debt to electronic acts such as Kraftwerk, OMD, and Giorgio Moroder.

== Track listing ==
All tracks produced by Fred Maher, except "Running" produced by Paul Robb. The album divides its tracks into two thematic sections, "Software" and "Hardware", reflecting the band's conceptual framing of the album.

Software
No.	Title	Writer(s)	Length
1.	"What's on Your Mind (Pure Energy)"	Robb; Kurt Valaquen	4:33
2.	"Tomorrow"	Robb; Amanda Kramer; Valaquen	4:08
3.	"Lay All Your Love on Me"	Benny Andersson; Björn Ulvaeus	3:39
4.	"Repetition"	Robb	4:32
5.	"Walking Away"	Robb	5:01

Hardware
No.	Title	Writer(s)	Length
6.	"Over the Sea"	Valaquen	3:53
7.	"Attitude"	Robb; Valaquen	4:11
8.	"Something in the Air"	Robb	4:53
9.	"Running"	Murat Konar	7:41
10.	"Make It Funky"	Robb	1:11

== Personnel ==
Credits adapted from the liner notes of Information Society.

=== Information Society ===
- Paul Robb – keyboards and programming, arrangements
- Kurt Valaquen – samples, Vocals
- James Cassidy – bass, keyboards
- Amanda Kramer – keyboards, synthesizers

=== Additional musicians ===
- Murat Konar – vocals (track 9)
- ELIZA – guest vocals (track 10)

=== Technical ===
- Fred Maher – production, mixing, recording engineering (tracks 1–8, 10); arrangements, programming
- Paul Robb – production (track 9)
- Roey Shamir – mixing, mix engineering (tracks 1–8, 10)
- Joey Gardner – mixing (track 9)
- "Little" Louie Vega – mixing (track 9)
- Kevin Laffey – executive production
- Chopper Black – recording engineering (track 9)
- Eric Calvi – mix engineering (track 9)
- Jon Smith – mix engineering (track 9)
- Oz Fritz – engineering assistance
- Angela Piva – engineering assistance
- The Latin Rascals (Tony Moran and Albert Cabrera) – edits (track 9)
- Herb Powers Jr. – mastering

=== Artwork ===
- Grey Organisation – art direction
- Isabel Snyder – photography
- Steven Miglio – layout
- Daniel Shapiro – typography

== Charts ==
Chart performance for Information Society
Chart (1988)	Peak position
Canada Top Albums/CDs (RPM)	41
US Billboard 200	25
US Top R&B/Hip-Hop Albums (Billboard)	78

== Certifications ==
Certifications for Information Society
Region	Certification	Certified units/sales
United States (RIAA)	Gold	500,000^{^}
^{^} Shipments figures based on certification alone.
