= Hack (album) =

Studio album by Information Society
- Released: October 16, 1990
- Genres: Synthpop, freestyle, electronica
- Length: 62:46
- Labels: Tommy Boy/Reprise/Warner Bros. Records; 26258
- Producers: Fred Maher; Paul Robb

Information Society chronology
Information Society (1988)	Hack (1990)	Peace and Love, Inc. (1992)

Professional ratings
Review scores
Source	Rating
AllMusic	2/5 stars

Hack is an album by the freestyle synthpop band Information Society. The album sold quite well but did not outsell the band's first album. It is the only major-label-distributed title that has the modern Tommy Boy Records logo on it.

== Artwork and packaging ==
The menacing car on the cover is "Vector", Kurt Harland's heavily customized 1973 Plymouth Satellite Sebring. The cassette tape for this album used an unusual naming convention for the sides. Instead of 1 and 2 or A and B, there was the Gilligan Side and the Skipper Side. The vinyl edition had a Scooby Side and a Shaggy Side.

== Musical style ==
"Seek 200"
An 18 second sample of "Seek 200" that demonstrates the harsher sound that was used on this album compared with the debut album.

Riding on the success of its self-titled major-label debut, Harland decided to have the band experiment on this album with a more radical, harsher sound. The other members agreed somewhat, feeling that they should stay on level ground with the pop sensibilities. This is more pronounced on tracks like "Seek 200" and "Hard Currency". This notion eventually lead to Don't Be Afraid, Harland's solo album.

Like the others, this album is thick with samples and loops, including Kraftwerk, James Brown, Nitzer Ebb and Beastie Boys.

=== Star Trek references ===
There are multiple references to the first Star Trek series on various tracks on the album. On the track "Charlie X", the line "I could make you all go away, any time I want to" is a reference to the episode "Charlie X". On "Come with Me," the following lines are a reference to the episode "The Changeling":

"What is the meaning?"

"Singing, What purpose is singing?"

"I like to sing. I felt like music"

== Track listing ==
Standard edition
No.	Title	Writer(s)	Length
1.	"Seek 200"	Kurt Harland Valaquen	3:06
2.	"How Long"	Paul Robb	4:06
3.	"Think/Wenn Wellen Schwingen"	Paul Robb	5:05
4.	"A Knife & a Fork/R.I.P."	Paul Robb	3:23
5.	"Now That I Have You"	Paul Robb	5:04
6.	"Fire Tonight"	Kurt Harland Valaquen	5:39
7.	"Can't Slow Down/T.V. Addicts"	Paul Robb	5:14
8.	"Hard Currency"	Kurt Harland Valaquen	2:34
9.	"Move Out/CP Drill KKL"	Kurt Harland Valaquen, Fred Maher	4:34
10.	"Mirrorshades/We Don't Take"	Paul Robb	5:38
11.	"Hack 1/Charlie X"	Paul Robb	3:32
12.	"If Only"	Paul Robb	4:06
13.	"Come With Me"	Kurt Harland Valaquen, Fred Maher	4:23
14.	"Slipping Away/Here Is Kazmeyer"	Kurt Harland Valaquen	4:12
15.	"Chemistry"	Paul Robb	2:12
Total length:			1:02:46

Note

- The sub-listings under several main tracks are index 2, while each of the main tracks is index 1. These are listed as the decimal part of the track number on the back cover of the jewel case. For example, "Slipping Away" is 14.0, "Here Is Kazmeyer" is 14.1, though they will usually play or be ripped as a single track numbered 14.

== Personnel ==
Information Society

- Kurt Harland – lead vocals, programming, MIDI
- Paul Robb – programming, MIDI
- James Cassidy – backing vocals, programming, MIDI
- Think Tank – MIDI

Additional musicians

- India – backing vocals (2, 7, 10)
- Nocera – backing vocals (3, 5, 6, 9, 12, 13)

Artwork

- Janette Beckman – photography
- Kim Champagne – art direction

Technical

- Information Society – production
- Paul Robb – mixing
- Paul Berry – assistant, assistant engineer
- Debi Cornish – assistant engineer
- Kevin Laffey – executive producer, producer
- Fred Maher – engineer, mixing, producer, programming
- Lloyd Puckitt – engineer, mixing
- Bob Rosa – engineer, mixing
- Dana Vlcek – assistant, assistant engineer
