= Information society (disambiguation) =

An information society is a society in which the manipulation of information is a significant and sometimes measured amount of personal activity.

Information society may also refer to:

- Information Society (band), a synth-pop band
  - Information Society (album), the band's first album
- The Information Society, a journal
- The IEEE Information Theory Society, a group for professionals studying information theory
