= Walking Away (Information Society song) =

Single by Information Society

from the album Information Society
- B-side: "Make It Funky"
- Released: 1988
- Recorded: 1988
- Genre: New wave
- Length: 5:01 (album version); 3:59 (radio and video edits)
- Label: Tommy Boy
- Songwriter: Paul Robb
- Producer: Fred Maher

Information Society singles chronology
"What's on Your Mind (Pure Energy)" (1988)	"Walking Away" (1988)	"Repetition" (1989)

Music video
- "Walking Away" on YouTube

"Walking Away" is a 1988 song by American synth-pop group, Information Society. Released as a single in late 1988, the song peaked at No. 9 in the United States in February 1989, No. 5 in the Hot Dance Club Play chart and No. 15 on the Modern Rock Tracks chart. "Walking Away" is the second single from the band's eponymous album. The music video was directed by Mark Pellington.

The song contains samples of William Shatner as James T. Kirk saying "It is useless to resist us" from the Star Trek episode, "Mirror, Mirror", and James Doohan as Scotty saying "Let's Go See!" from the Star Trek episode, "Wolf in the Fold".

== Background ==
Keyboardist Paul Robb said,

"Walking Away" was a song where I sat down and said, "I want to write a song that's kind of like "What's on Your Mind," but it's going to be directed to some former members of our band who had sort of quit the band at an importune moment. As a matter of fact, they both quit right before we made it big with "Running." So if you listen to the lyrics of "Walking Away," it's basically just someone complaining about people who left. That's because that's exactly what it is. It's a very transparent song - there's no deep meanings in that one.

== Track listings ==
=== EP ===
1. "Walking Away" (S.M.D. Mix) – 7:09
2. "Walking Away" (House Dub) – 6:09
3. "Walking Away" (Radio Version) – 3:59

=== 12" single ===
Walking Away
No.	Title	Length
1.	"Walking Away" (Space Age Mix)	6:36
2.	"Space Age Dub"	7:57
3.	"Make It funkier" (Boot It Up Vocal)	2:56
4.	"Walking Away" (S.M.D. mix)	7:09
5.	"Walking Away" (House Dub)	6:09
6.	"Walking Away" (Radio Version)	3:59

=== CD single ===
No.	Title	Length
1.	"Walking Away" (Radio Version)	3:58
2.	"Walking Away" (LP Version)	5:01
3.	"Walking Away" (Space Age Mix)	6:36
4.	"Walking Away" (S.M.D. mix)	7:08

== Charts ==
Chart (1988–1989)	Peak position
Canada RPM Top Singles	23
Canada RPM Canadian Dance Chart	9
Canada RPM 30 Retail Singles	24
US Billboard Hot 100	9
US Hot Dance Music/Club Play	5
US Hot Dance Music/Maxi-Singles Sales	1
US Hot Black Singles	64
US Modern Rock Tracks	15
US Cashbox	10
US Dance Tracks (Dance Music Report)	1
US Radio & Records	6
