= Whiplash (video game) =

2003 video game

- US box art for PS2 version
- Developer: Crystal Dynamics (Note: Additional work by Nixxes Software.)
- Publisher: Eidos Interactive
- Director: Noah Hughes
- Producer: Alex Jones
- Programmer: Paul Taylor
- Artist: Scott Anderson
- Writer: Richard Gaubert
- Composer: Kurt Harland
- Platforms: PlayStation 2, Xbox
- Release: NA: November 18, 2003; EU: March 5, 2004
- Genres: Platform, action-adventure
- Mode: Single-player

Whiplash is a 2003 platform video game for the PlayStation 2 and Xbox. The game follows the adventures of Spanx, a long-tailed weasel, and Redmond, a rabbit, who find themselves chained together inside the warehouse of Genron, a product testing corporation run by the animal-hating CEO Franklin D. Mann. The game is a 3D platformer, with Spanx being controlled by the player for the majority of the game, and Redmond used more in combat or as a means of traversing the world.

The game was featured on the cover of PSE2. There was also some controversy over the game's depiction of animal cruelty.

== Gameplay ==
The chain can be used in a variety of ways.

Although Redmond (the rabbit) and Spanx (the weasel) are two animals chained together, the gameplay is much like any other platformer. The player controls only Spanx, using Redmond as a weapon or tool as the situation requires. Spanx has most standard platforming abilities, while Redmond is completely indestructible as a result of cosmetics testing conducted upon him by Genron. Redmond can be hurled into security guards, jammed into machinery, and used as a grappling hook, among other uses. Redmond can also be inserted into special "Fusion Outlets" to be set on fire, frozen, electrified, inflated with helium, or drenched in radioactive waste.

Defeating human enemies found in the levels allows special "Hypersnacks" to be looted that the team can eat to increase both animals' levels, which increases Spanx' health or Redmond's rage. The player is also rewarded for freeing the other animals trapped and caged by Genron.

Many objects are breakable and are assigned a dollar amount; if the player completes the game with more than $6 million in damage, Genron will be bankrupted and special content will be unlocked.

== Development ==
Spanx the Weasel first appeared in the game Mad Dash Racing in 2001. The music for Whiplash was composed by Kurt Harland of Information Society. The music features a unique interactivity scheme: it responds to player input on the controller; the more input received through the controller buttons, the more the music does. The music also expands in response to successful hits of breakable objects and enemies.

== Reception ==
Reception

Aggregate score
Aggregator	Score	
Aggregator	PS2	Xbox
Metacritic	66/100	68/100

Review scores
Publication	Score	
Publication	PS2	Xbox
Edge	5/10	N/A
Electronic Gaming Monthly	7/10	7/10
Eurogamer	5/10	N/A
Game Informer	4/10	4/10
GamePro	N/A	4.5/5
GameRevolution	C−	C−
GameSpot	6.4/10	6.6/10
GameSpy	2/5	2/5
GameZone	7/10	7.2/10
IGN	7/10	7/10
Official U.S. PlayStation Magazine	3.5/5	N/A
Official Xbox Magazine (US)	N/A	6.8/10
The Times	3/5	N/A

Whiplash received "average" reviews according to video game review aggregator Metacritic.

Before the game was released in the United Kingdom, the Royal Society for the Prevention of Cruelty to Animals (RSPCA), the Research Defence Society, the chairman of the British House of Commons and the Police Federation of England and Wales were deeply shocked at the level of cartoonish cruelty in animal product testing, despite the whole premise of the game as being against this. They thought it condoned violence and made a joke of animal suffering, but Eidos claimed that it would raise positive awareness among children with this issue.
