= Synthesizer (album) =

Studio album by Information Society
- Released: September 1, 2007 (limited Edition release by Hakatak); October 9, 2007 (in-store release by Dancing Ferret)
- Recorded: 2006
- Genre: Synth-pop; electropop; freestyle
- Length: 60:13
- Label: Hakatak; Dancing Ferret

Information Society chronology
| Oscillator (2007) | Synthesizer (2007) | Apocryphon: Electro Roots 1982–1985 (2008) |

Synthesizer is an album by the electronic band Information Society. It was released on September 1, 2007, from the band's official website, and on October 9, 2007, in record stores.

== Track listing ==
1. "Baby Just Wants" – 5:16
2. "Back in the Day" – 4:49
3. "I Like the Way You Werk It" – 4:41
4. "Run Away" – 3:46
5. "Free" – 4:12
6. "I Love It When..." – 4:47
7. "More to This" – 3:53
8. "Somnambulistic" – 4:53
9. "Burning Bridges" – 5:56
10. "Can't Get Enough" – 3:37
11. "This Way Tonight" – 4:15
12. "Synthesizer" – 4:41
13. "The Seeds of Pain" – 5:27

== Track listing for the Brazilian pressing on Maxpop/Universal ==
1. "Baby Just Wants" – 5:16
2. "Back in the Day" – 4:49
3. "I Like the Way You Werk It" – 4:41
4. "Run Away" – 3:46
5. "Free" – 4:12
6. "I Love It When..." – 4:47
7. "More to This" – 3:53
8. "Somnambulistic" – 4:53
9. "Burning Bridges" – 5:56
10. "Can't Get Enough" – 3:37
11. "This Way Tonight" – 4:15
12. "The Seeds of Pain" – 5:27
13. "Synthesizer" – 4:41
14. "Back in the Day" (Maxpop Remix)
15. "Runaway 2008" (Maxpop Remix)

== Liner notes ==
=== Production credits ===
- Produced by: Information Society
- Music director: Paul Robb
- Recorded at Paul's house

=== Musical credits ===
- Paul Robb
- James Cassidy
- Christopher Anton
- Leila Mack
- Colleen Fitzpatrick
- Kurt Harland Larson – vocals on "The Seeds of Pain"
- Angela Michael
- Dave Derby

=== Additional credits ===
- Art direction: Adam King / King Design Office
- Photography: Tyler Shields, Brandon Showers
