= The InSoc EP =

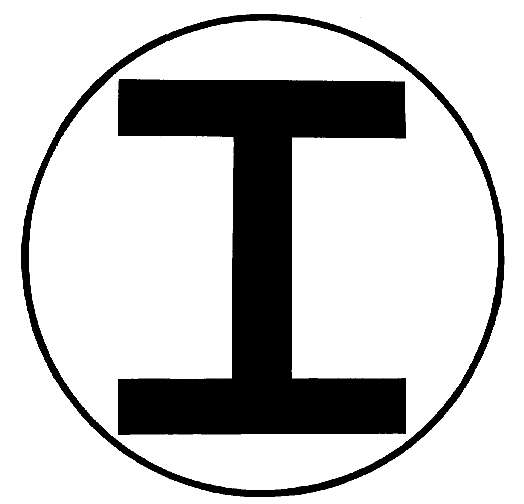

EP by Information Society
- Released: 1983
- Recorded: March 1983
- Genre: Synthpop

Information Society chronology
The InSoc EP (1983)	Creatures of Influence (1984)

The InSoc EP (also called The Information Society) is an EP by the synthpop band Information Society. It was their first record.

The InSoc EP was recorded in 14 hours, for $600. Only 1,000 copies were printed, at a cost of $1000, and around 50 were actually sold. Harland saved around 200, but most were discarded and destroyed. The remaining copies were put for sale, autographed, on Information Society's website on June 12, 2007; they were sold out by the next day.

It was temporarily made available for free listening on the band's website but was removed in preparation for the re-release in the Apocryphon compilation.

== Track listing ==
All songs composed by Paul Robb; track 4 based on "Get Up Offa That Thing" by James Brown.

1. "Bacchanale" – 1:38
2. "Fall in Line" – 3:44
3. "Growing Up with Shiva" – 4:15
4. "Get Up (Away from that Thing)" – 5:35
5. "Can You Live as Fast as Me" – 5:13

== Personnel ==
- Kurt Harland
- Pamela Brustman
- Paul Robb
- Kristin Leader
- Jim Cassidy
