= Oscillator (EP) =

EP by Information Society
- Released: March 19, 2007 (online); June 21, 2007 (CD)
- Recorded: 2006, 2007
- Label: Hakatak
- Producer: Information Society

Information Society chronology
Pure Energy (2004)	Oscillator (2007)	Synthesizer (2007)

Alternative cover
- Online release

Oscillator is an EP by Information Society. It was their first new commercial release after six-year break.

This six-song record uses the vocal stylings of newcomer Christopher Anton, as well as a range of intriguing guests and remixers. In addition to four mixes of the underground hit "Back in the Day", there is a live recording of "Great Big Disco World", made at Club Milky Robot in Osaka, Japan, in 2006.

== Release ==
Oscillator was released March 19, 2007, as an Internet-only EP, offered for purchase through a variety of web-based music retailers including iTunes, Napster and Rhapsody. A CD version of Oscillator was released June 21, 2007, with an extra audio track and a bonus CD-ROM video track.

== Track listing ==
1. "Back in the Day"
2. "Back in the Day (Kasino Mix)"
3. "Back in the Day (Electro Roots Mix)"
4. "Back in the Day (Kain & Arvy Mix)"
5. "I Like The Way You Werk It"
6. "Great Big Disco World (Live) (feat. Vitamin C)"
