= Death Jr. and the Science Fair of Doom =

2007 video game

- Developer: Backbone Entertainment
- Publisher: Konami
- Series: Death Jr.
- Platform: Nintendo DS
- Release: NA: May 22, 2007; EU: July 25, 2007; AU: August 3, 2007
- Genres: Platform, action-adventure
- Modes: Single-player, multiplayer

Death Jr. and the Science Fair of Doom is a 2007 Nintendo DS platform game developed by Backbone Entertainment. It is one of the sequels to 2005's Death Jr., the other being Death Jr. II: Root of Evil. In this game, Death Jr. and Pandora are both playable. The game uses both screens, as well as the touch capabilities. It also features local wireless multiplayer.

== Reception ==
Reception

Aggregate scores
Aggregator	Score
GameRankings	50.42%
Metacritic	47/100

Review scores
Publication	Score
1Up.com	F
Game Informer	7/10
GameRevolution	C−
GameSpot	4.9/10
GamesRadar+	2.5/5
GameZone	6/10
IGN	4/10
Nintendo Power	5/10
PALGN	6/10
X-Play	2/5

The game was met with mixed to negative reception, as GameRankings gave it a score of 50.42% while Metacritic gave it 47 out of 100.
