= Brooktown High =

2007 video game

- Cover art
- Developer: Backbone Entertainment
- Publisher: Konami
- Platform: PlayStation Portable
- Release: NA: May 22, 2007
- Genre: Dating sim
- Mode: Single-player

Brooktown High (working title: Brooktown High: Senior Year) is a dating sim video game for the PlayStation Portable. It was developed by Backbone Entertainment and published by Konami.

== Gameplay ==
Being touted as "your chance to re-live your high school days," Brooktown High places the gamer in the shoes of either a male or female high school student. This character is customizable, to some extent - hair style and color, eye color, height and weight are editable. Questions at the beginning of the game categorize the player into one of the social cliques.

The player then gets to interact with the 20 other students at Brooktown, who have their own social circles and distinct personalities, in order to become part of the different cliques. There are four different cliques: Nerds, Jocks, Preps, and Rebels.

The main goal is to find a boyfriend or girlfriend, who can be taken on dates to various locations such the movies, the beach, and the mall. Players may be asked to perform favors in exchange for characters' phone numbers.

Various mini-games will be used to reach the goals mentioned above. Each game boosts some percentage of the player's clique points (for example, smarts points to get into the nerds clique and athletic points to get into the jocks clique).

== Reception ==
Reception

Aggregate score
Aggregator	Score
Metacritic	51/100

Review scores
Publication	Score
1Up.com	D+
Electronic Gaming Monthly	4.83/10
Game Informer	6.75/10
GameSpot	5.6/10
GameSpy	1.5/5
GameZone	5.5/10
Hardcore Gamer	2.5/5
IGN	5.2/10
Pocket Gamer	2/5
PlayStation: The Official Magazine	8/10
411Mania	2.5/10

The game received "mixed" reviews according to the review aggregation website Metacritic.
