= Monster Lab =

2008 video game

- Developer: Backbone Entertainment
- Publisher: Eidos
- Platforms: Wii, PlayStation 2, Nintendo DS
- Release: November 4, 2008
- Genre: Action role-playing
- Modes: Single player, multiplayer (Nintendo versions only)

Monster Lab is a video game for the Wii, PlayStation 2 and Nintendo DS that was developed by Backbone Entertainment and published by Eidos. Debuting at the 2006 Comic-Con International convention in comic book form as Mad Science Alliance, the game was described as "Pokémon meets Tim Burton". The player controls a scientist and is helped by three professors to build his own humanoid monster. There are 150 parts to build a monster (which affect the monster's strengths and weaknesses), and 300 items. The Wii version featured Wi-Fi online modes until the service was discontinued. In addition to turn-based combat, extensive use is made of the DS stylus and Wii Remote and Nunchuck in monster-building minigames.

== Mad Sciences ==
A main point of the game focuses on the three types of Mad Sciences. They are mechanical, biological and alchemical. Three portions of the Castle (your HQ) are the three areas of these sciences. They are the Workshop (owned by Professor Fuseless), bio chamber (owned by Dr. Heleena Sonderbar), and arcanium (owned by Brazo De La Sombra).

- The mechanical science makes mechanical parts for your monster, they may be gear and steam-powered or shiny and futuristic.
- The biological science makes living parts, a lot of plants, and things made of human and animal flesh.
- The alchemical science makes (summons) magic parts for your monsters, including undead, elemental, or mythical creature components.

Mechanical attacks are strong against biological parts, biological attacks are strong against alchemical parts, and alchemical attacks are strong against mechanical parts. In order to create parts, you have to collect ingredients from defeated enemies and mini-games. Those ingredients are brought to the labs of one of the three mad scientists where you play mini-games to combine the pieces into either legs, heads, torsos, or arms. You may then create your own controllable monster by combining the parts into a single creature.

== Plot ==
The world of Uncanny Valley has been plunged into darkness by the iron-fist rule of Baron Mharti. It is up to you and the decorated mad scientists to defeat him and restore peace to their world.

== Reception ==
The Wii version was nominated for Best RPG for the Wii by IGN in its 2008 video game awards.
