= Christopher Anton =

American singer-songwriter

- Christopher Anton

Background information
- Also known as: christopher ANTON
- Born: Christopher A. Jones; July 21; San Gabriel, California, United States
- Genres: Synthpop
- Occupation: Singer-songwriter
- Instrument: Vocals
- Years active: 1996–present
- Labels: 2003, with Pseudocipher: Gem Tree; 2006–2009, with Information Society: Hakatak, Dancing Ferret; 2009–2012: Mirror Piece Records; 2010: A Different Drum
- Members: Nick James; Donna Jean; Dimitri Hammond; DJ Hans242; Jon Siren
- Website: christopherantonmusic.com

Christopher Anton, alternately styled christopher ANTON, (born July 21), is an American singer-songwriter. Anton is known for being the vocalist of the synthpop band Information Society, as well as the synth rock band Pseudocipher. In 2010, Anton gained popularity as a solo artist with the release of his cover version of the dance single "Fade to Grey". After the success of "Fade to Grey", Anton released his debut album Destination: X.

== History ==
=== Pseudocipher ===
Christopher Anton founded the alternative synth-rock band Pseudocipher in 1998. The band initially began by recording a collage of electronic synthpop and rock inspired pieces. This origin inevitably led the band to having two releases, Pseudocipher (self-titled) in 1998, and Fragments of Empathy in 2003. Fragments of Empathy (aka FOE) was produced by the French Brothers in Burbank, California, and was released on Gem Tree Records. On FOE, Anton was joined by Jon Siren (drums) and Natasha Cox (keys) of Mankind Is Obsolete. The success of Fragments of Empathy saw the band sharing the stage with acts such as Berlin, Real Life, Daniel Ash (Bauhaus) and Anything Box.

=== 101 ===
In March 2003, Anton auditioned for and was chosen as lead singer and frontman for Adolfo Valencia's Depeche Mode cover band, 101. Valencia (guitars, keyboards and vocals) and Anton were joined by Oziel Rufio (keyboards and vocals) and by Anton's Pseudocipher bandmate, Siren (drums).

=== Information Society ===
In January 2006, Anton auditioned for and was selected as the new lead singer for the synthpop band Information Society. Anton began recording with Paul Robb and James Cassidy (two of the band's original members) in January 2006 with Anton co-writing several tracks alongside Robb. The sessions lasted until January 2007 and the results were twofold. An EP entitled Oscillator and its counterpart, the full-length release Synthesizer were both released in late 2007. The two releases marked the first new music from Information Society in 10 years. Synthesizer is a nod to the band's electro-dance origins with tracks "Burning Bridges", "Back in the Day" and "Baby Just Wants" and also reached the top 5 on Germany's DAC album chart. During 2006–2007, Anton performed as frontman for Information Society, which included shows for crowds in numbers up to 20,000 in Oregon, California, New York, New Jersey, and Brazil. In late 2007, Anton recorded and released the international dance track "I’m Lost in You" which was written and produced by electroclash pioneer Isaac Junkie from Mexico City. In October 2007, Anton joined Isaac Junkie in a sold-out performance at the Club Ultravioleta in Mexico City.

=== Solo career ===
In November 2008, Anton released his first solo EP, Your Perfect Tragedy. To create the EP, Anton teamed up with producer Nick James, and began performing live with Nick James (keyboards, synthesizers) and Donna Jean (keyboards, bass, percussion).

In 2010, Anton released a dance maxi single, "Fade to Grey", a cover of the 1980 Visage song. Anton's full-length album entitled Destination:X was released on July 20, 2010, through U.S. Synthpop label A Different Drum as a Limited Edition C.D. A remix contest for the track "Lovefix" soon followed.

In 2012, Anton announced his newest release Spaceships and Dreamers, an EP jointly produced by Nick James and John von Ahlen of Parralox. It also features Donna Jean on vocals, and a guest appearance by Houston hip hop artist Drastic Vango.

On March 1, 2013, an EP featuring new remixes of the track "In Silence" from Spaceships and Dreamers plus additional B-sides was released.

In 2019, Anton announced that a new album is in the works. The first single, titled "Living on the Edge of Time", was released on June 6, 2019.

== Discography ==
=== Albums and EPs ===
Pseudocipher

- Pseudocipher (1998 LP)
- Fragments of Empathy (2003 LP)

Information Society

- Oscillator (2007 EP)
- Synthesizer (2007 LP)
- Modulator (2009 EP)

Christopher Anton

- Your Perfect Tragedy (2008 EP)
- Fade to Grey (2010 maxi-single)
- Destination: X (2010 LP)
- Spaceships And Dreamers (2012 EP)
- In Silence (2013 EP)
- We Are The Free (2013 single)
- Personal Jesus (2016 single)
- Don't Let Me Go (2017 single)
- Genesis of Sound (Volume 1) (2017 compilation)
- Send Me An Angel (2017 single)
- Calling Love (Ricardo Autobahn Remix) (2017 single)
- Connected (2017 album)
- Living on the Edge of Time (2019 single)
- Don't Let Me Go (2019 EP)
- A Broken Thought (2019 single)
- Danger! (2020 single)
- Danger! (Club Mix) (2020 single)
- Blinding Lights (2020 single)
- Genesis of Sound II (2021 compilation)
- I Was Made For Lovin' You (2022 single)
- Heartbeat One (2023 single)
- Behind The Sun (Coast-to-Coast Mixes) (2024 single)
- Behind The Sun (Unplugged Mix) (2024 single)
- Don't Cry Tonight (2024 single)
- Signals (2024 single)
- Fade To Grey (Nick James Mix) (2024 single)
