= Nightmare Circus =

1996 video game

- South American cover art
- Developer: Funcom
- Publishers: NA: Sega; BR: Tec Toy
- Producer: Maxwell Taylor
- Designer: Ricardo Pinto
- Programmer: Johan Andersson
- Artist: Lars-Petter Anfinsen
- Composers: Kurt Harland; Jim Hedges; Andy Armer
- Platform: Mega Drive/Genesis
- Release: NA/EU: April 1996 (Sega Channel); BRA: 1996; EU: May 1997 (Sega Channel)
- Genre: Platform
- Modes: Single-player, multiplayer

Nightmare Circus is a platform video game developed by Funcom and published by Tec Toy for the Sega Mega Drive. The game was first released in April 1996 on the Sega Channel in North America by Sega, and physically released on cartridge in Brazil sometime that same year. It was also released on the Sega Channel in Europe the following year.

== Plot ==
The story begins with a circus that was held out in the desert of Arizona. On opening night, the circus was burned completely to the ground by its shady and villainous operator, the Jester, who intended to cash in on an insurance policy. Afterwards, the Jester was convicted for the deaths of the fire victims. However, before he was executed, the Jester warned that the souls of his victims would be forever tormented. Many years later, a Native American named Raven, who had lost relatives in the fire, goes to investigate the location where the circus was held, and where supernatural events have been reported. Night comes, and suddenly there appears, via the psi-energy of the Jester, a ghostly apparition of the destroyed circus.

== Gameplay ==
Players can stick to the wall via centripetal force, but only when the room is spinning sufficiently fast.

In the game, Raven must go through multiple levels of the circus environment using various fighting moves to destroy enemies. The game has a normal one-player mode, but it also features a cooperative two-player mode, a one-on-one duel mode where a player can fight against a second player or an enemy character, and a mode where one player controls Raven and the second player controls the generation of the enemies in the game.

The game has a "Tweak" mode which allows a player to adjust numerous game variables such as the gravity, the speed of objects, and the appearance of enemies. The soundtrack was composed by Jim Hedges, Kurt Harland Larsen, and Andy Armer.

== Reception ==
USA magazine Next Generation commented that the game had a lot more detail than many other platform games, but that its potential significance was reduced since the Sega Genesis was starting to be supplanted by other consoles. The game's intended North American release in late 1995 was indeed cancelled, though it later appeared in that region for the Sega Channel.
