= Repetition (Information Society song) =

Single by Information Society

from the album Information Society
- Released: 1989
- Genre: Electronic-Ballad
- Length: 4:32 (album version); 4:00 (radio version)
- Label: Tommy Boy Records
- Songwriter: Paul Robb

Information Society singles chronology
"Walking Away" (1988)	"Repetition" (1989)	"Lay All Your Love on Me" (1989)

Audio sample
- file; help

Music video
- "Repetition" on YouTube

"Repetition" is a ballad by the electronic band Information Society, released in 1989 as the third single from the band's self-titled album, Information Society. Unlike the band's two prior singles, which reached the Top 10 on the Billboard Hot 100, "Repetition" only peaked at No. 76.

The music video, shot in black and white, shows the band amidst building ruins and old objects, which visually complements the melancholic lyrics

== Tracks ==
7" Single

No.	Title	Length
1.	"Repetition (Edit)"	4:00
2.	"Something in the Air"	4:53

12" Single

No.	Title	Length
1.	"Repetition" (LP Version)	4:32
2.	"Something in the Air" (Extended Club Edit)	6:24
3.	"Something in the Air" (Dub)	6:24

CD Single

No.	Title	Length
1.	"Repetition" (Edit)	4:00
2.	"Repetition" (LP Version)	4:32

== Charts ==
Chart (1989)	Peak position
US Billboard Hot 100	76
