= Fred Maher =

American drummer, music programmer and record producer

- Birth name: Frederick J. Maher
- Born: Manhattan, New York, U.S.
- Genres: Rock; new wave; post-punk
- Occupations: Musician; music programmer; record producer
- Instrument: Drums
- Labels: E.G.; Elektra

Frederick J. Maher is an American drummer, music programmer and record producer.

He was a member of the bands Massacre (1980–81), the Dance, Material, Scritti Politti, and has recorded and toured with Lou Reed. In 1984 he released Basic, an instrumental collaboration album with ex-Voidoids guitarist Robert Quine.

Maher's credits as a producer include Lou Reed's New York (1989), Trip Shakespeare's Across the Universe (1990), Matthew Sweet's Girlfriend (1991), Information Society's self-titled album (1988, which achieved platinum sales status), their 1990 album Hack, and a track on 1997's Don't Be Afraid. Maher co-produced Lloyd Cole's self-titled debut solo album. He was nominated for a Grammy for his work on Fuel's Natural Selection album.

Maher regularly works as a studio drummer, and he has often collaborated with entertainment producer Ron Baldwin.

== Discography ==
=== Solo ===
- Basic (1984, with Robert Quine)
