= InSoc Recombinant =

Remix album by Information Society
- Released: April 6, 1999
- Length: 58:21
- Label: Cleopatra

Information Society chronology
Don't Be Afraid (1997)	InSoc Recombinant (1999)	strange haircuts // cardboard guitars // and computer samples (2001)

Professional ratings
Review scores
Source	Rating
AllMusic	2/5 stars

InSoc Recombinant is a remix album by the electronic band Information Society. It includes, as a bonus, a CD-ROM with five music videos.

== Track listing ==
1. "What's on Your Mind (Pure Energy)" (CKB Remix) – 4:48
2. "Closing In" (Rosetta Stone Mix) – 4:59
3. "Peace & Love, Inc." (Biokraft Mix) – 4:59
4. "Think" (Spahn Ranch Mix) – 4:58
5. "What's on Your Mind? (Pure Energy)" (Girl Eats Boy Mix) – 4:59
6. "Walking Away" (Leæther Strip Mix) – 4:59
7. "Going Going Gone" (Razed in Black Mix) – 4:56
8. "What's on Your Mind? (Pure Energy)" (Judson Leach and the Exhibition Mix) – 4:51
9. "Empty" (Astralasia Mix) – 4:59
10. "Ending World" (Electric Hellfire Club Mix) – 4:48
11. "On the Outside" (THC Mix) – 4:15
12. "What's on Your Mind? (Pure Energy)" (David J Remix) – 4:50

Notes:

- The Brazilian release included Information Society's cover of Madonna's "Express Yourself" (previously released on the compilation Virgin Voices Vol. 1: A Tribute to Madonna).
- All the remixes of "What's on Your Mind? (Pure Energy)" were released on a 12-inch single the year before.

== Video listing ==
- "What's on Your Mind (Pure Energy)"
- "Walking Away"
- "Repetition"
- "Think"
- "Peace & Love, Inc"
