= Backbone Entertainment =

American video game developer

- Type: Subsidiary
- Industry: Video games
- Founded: 2003; 23 years ago
- Defunct: 2015; 11 years ago
- Fate: Dissolved
- Headquarters: Emeryville, California, US
- Products: Death Jr.
- Parent: Foundation 9 Entertainment (2005–2015)

Backbone Entertainment was an American video game developer based in Emeryville, California. The company was formed in 2003 as the result of a merger between developers Digital Eclipse and ImaginEngine. In 2005, Backbone merged with The Collective to form Foundation 9 Entertainment.

== History ==
Backbone Entertainment was formed in 2003 through a merger between Digital Eclipse, a developer of emulations of arcade games, and ImaginEngine, an edutainment games developer. ImaginEngine remained an independent studio, based in Framingham, Massachusetts, while Digital Eclipse's studios were absorbed by Backbone, becoming Backbone Emeryville and Backbone Vancouver, respectively. In 2004, in co-operation with the University of Hawaii, Backbone opened an office in Honolulu, Hawaii, under the lead of Backbone's chairman, Mark Loughridge. On March 29, 2005, Backbone Entertainment announced that it was merging with another developer, The Collective, to form Foundation 9 Entertainment. By this point, Backbone also operated Games2Learn, another edutainment game developer. Later in 2005, Backbone first rose to prominence with the release of Death Jr., a game for PlayStation Portable.

In February 2006, Backbone opened another subsidiary studio, Backbone Charlottetown, in Charlottetown, Prince Edward Island, Canada, under the lead of Andrew Ayre. In May 2007, the new studio, including Ayre and several former Digital Eclipse employees, spun off from Backbone and became Other Ocean Interactive, aiming at showcasing Digital Eclipse's former traits in a smaller fashion. In September 2008, Backbone let go most people employed at its Vancouver studio, followed by a full closure of the studio in May 2009. In October 2012, Backbone laid off the majority of its Emeryville-based staff to avoid closing completely. A few days later, it was reported that ImaginEngine had shut down, leaving 25 people, including studio head Randall Sanborn, out of work.

== Subsidiaries ==
- Backbone Charlottetown (2006–2007)
- Backbone Emeryville (2003–2015)
- Backbone Vancouver (2003–2009)
- Games2Learn
- ImaginEngine (2003–2012)

== Games developed ==
Year	Title	Platform(s)
2004	The Incredibles: Escape from Nomanisan Island	Microsoft Windows
2005	Rifts: Promise of Power	N-Gage
2005	Death Jr.	PlayStation Portable
2005	Rayman: Hoodlums' Revenge	Game Boy Advance
2005	Namco Museum 50th Anniversary	GameCube, Game Boy Advance, Microsoft Windows, PlayStation 2, Xbox
2005	Smash TV	Xbox 360
2005	Gauntlet	Xbox 360
2005	Joust	Xbox 360
2006	Ultimate Mortal Kombat 3	Xbox 360
2006	Time Pilot	Xbox 360
2006	Scramble	Xbox 360
2006	Robotron: 2084	Xbox 360
2006	Contra	Xbox 360
2006	Frogger	Xbox 360
2006	Defender	Xbox 360
2006	Age of Empires: The Age of Kings	Nintendo DS
2006	Charlotte's Web	Game Boy Advance, Nintendo DS
2006	Death Jr. II: Root of Evil	PlayStation Portable, Wii
2006	NBA Ballers: Rebound	PlayStation Portable
2006	Sonic Rivals	PlayStation Portable
2006	MechAssault: Phantom War	Nintendo DS
2006	IWL: Interstellar Wrestling League	Mattel Hyperscan
2007	Castlevania: Symphony of the Night	Xbox 360
2007	Streets of Rage 2	PlayStation 3, Xbox 360
2007	Sonic the Hedgehog	PlayStation 3, Xbox 360
2007	Sonic the Hedgehog 2	PlayStation 3, Xbox 360
2007	Ecco the Dolphin	Xbox 360
2007	Golden Axe	Xbox 360
2007	Yie Ar Kung-Fu	Xbox 360
2007	Track & Field	Xbox 360
2007	Teenage Mutant Ninja Turtles	Xbox 360
2007	Super Contra	Xbox 360
2007	Rush'n Attack	Xbox 360
2007	Root Beer Tapper	Xbox 360
2007	Paperboy	Xbox 360
2007	Gyruss	Xbox 360
2007	Cyberball 2072	Xbox 360
2007	Bomberman Live	Xbox 360
2007	Death Jr. and the Science Fair of Doom	Nintendo DS
2007	Sonic the Hedgehog	iOS
2007	Brooktown High	PlayStation Portable
2007	Super Puzzle Fighter II Turbo HD Remix	PlayStation 3, Xbox 360
2007	Sonic Rivals 2	PlayStation Portable
2007	Shrek n' Roll	Xbox 360
2007	Yaris	Xbox 360
2008	Discs of Tron	Xbox 360
2008	Monster Lab	Wii, Nintendo DS, PlayStation 2
2008	Wolf of the Battlefield: Commando 3	PlayStation 3, Xbox 360
2008	1942: Joint Strike	PlayStation 3, Xbox 360
2008	Super Street Fighter II Turbo HD Remix	PlayStation 3, Xbox 360
2008	Tron	Xbox 360
2009	Altered Beast	Xbox 360
2009	Comix Zone	Xbox 360
2009	Diner Dash	Xbox 360
2009	Gunstar Heroes	Xbox 360
2009	Military Madness: Nectaris	Xbox 360
2009	Phantasy Star II	Xbox 360
2009	Space Invaders Extreme	Xbox 360
2009	Shinobi	Xbox 360
2009	Sonic the Hedgehog 3	Xbox 360
2009	Sonic & Knuckles	Xbox 360
2009	Sonic's Ultimate Genesis Collection	PlayStation 3, Xbox 360
2009	G.I. Joe: The Rise of Cobra	Nintendo DS
2009	Rock Band Unplugged	PlayStation Portable
2009	Lego Rock Band	Nintendo DS
2009	Marvel vs. Capcom 2	PlayStation 3, Xbox 360
2010	X-Men	PlayStation 3, Xbox 360
2010	Rock Band 3	Nintendo DS, Wii
2011	Ugly Americans: Apocalypsegeddon	PlayStation 3, Xbox 360
2011	Sonic Generations (Emulation for Sonic the Hedgehog)	PlayStation 3, Xbox 360
2011	Zombie Apocalypse: Never Die Alone	PlayStation 3, Xbox 360
2012	The Simpsons Arcade Game	PlayStation 3, Xbox 360
2012	Dance Central 3	Xbox 360
2012	Midway Arcade Origins	PlayStation 3, Xbox 360
