= Death Jr. =

2005 video game

- North American packaging artwork
- Developer: Backbone Entertainment
- Publisher: Konami
- Producer: Jessi Harrison
- Designer: Micah Russo
- Composer: Robert Baffy
- Platform: PlayStation Portable
- Release: NA: August 16, 2005; EU: February 10, 2006; AU: March 17, 2006
- Genres: Action, hack and slash
- Mode: Single-player

Death Jr. is a 2005 video game for the PlayStation Portable. The PSP iteration was the first PSP game shown publicly and advertised as a killer-app. It was released to a mixed reception and noted for many problems with the camera, gameplay and uninspiring graphics, but was praised for its Tim Burton themes and quirky characters. Slightly better received was the comic book adaptation by Gary Whitta and Ted Naifeh, which includes two three-issue miniseries. The game was followed by Death Jr. II: Root of Evil in 2006 and Death Jr. and the Science Fair of Doom in 2007.

Death Jr. was conceived during experiments with the engine of the cancelled game Prime 8, a planned spin-off to the Spyro the Dragon series.

== Gameplay ==
In the game, the player has a variety of guns ranging from pistols to a rocket launcher. The player controls the protagonist by moving around with the analog nub and attacking enemies with the square and circle buttons. There is a lot of emphasis on the combos which can be achieved by linking attacks to each other in rapid succession.

== Plot ==
The game and comic book are about the teenage son of the Grim Reaper, called Death Jr. (DJ for short). His father tried many times (all of them failed) to stop his son from creating chaos at every school he has attended. Now is DJ's last chance. If he creates chaos one more time, he will be sent to military school. He meets new friends at this school: Pandora, a girl with obsessive–compulsive disorder and a fascination for locked boxes; Stigmartha, a girl who has holes in her hands and bleeds from them whenever she is nervous; Smith and Weston, conjoined twins who are very smart and conjoined at the head; the Seep, an armless, legless, foul-mouthed kid in a vat; and the Dead Guppy, a character who speaks for himself.

The friends go on a field trip to a museum, where they find a locked box that Pandora wants opened, so DJ opens it to impress her. Unfortunately, all hell breaks loose and demons run amok. It is up to DJ to stop them and revert the town back to normal, all the while making sure Dad does not find out.

== Reception ==
Reception

Aggregate scores
Aggregator	Score
GameRankings	63.30%
Metacritic	61/100

Review scores
Publication	Score
1Up.com	C+
Edge	4/10
Electronic Gaming Monthly	4.83/10
Game Informer	7/10
GamePro	2.5/5
GameRevolution	C−
GameSpot	6.5/10
GameTrailers	7.1/10
IGN	7/10
Official U.S. PlayStation Magazine	2.5/5
CiN Weekly	68/100
Detroit Free Press	3/4

The game received average or mixed reviews, as GameRankings gave it a score of 63.30% while Metacritic gave it a score of 61 out of 100.

== See also ==
- Death Jr. and the Science Fair of Doom
- Death Jr. II: Root of Evil
