= Peace and Love, Inc. =

Peace and Love Inc.

Studio album by Information Society
- Released: October 26, 1992
- Genre: Synthpop, electronic
- Label: Tommy Boy/Reprise/Warner Bros. Records; 45093
- Producer: Paul Robb; Kurt Harland; Mike Thorne Eric Kupper Joey Beltram Karl Bartos

Information Society chronology
Hack (1990)	Peace and Love Inc. (1992)	Don't Be Afraid (1997)

Professional ratings
Review scores
Source	Rating
Allmusic	3/5 stars

Peace and Love Inc. is the third studio album by the synthpop band Information Society. The album received great critical reviews but the label did little to promote it. It was the least successful of the three albums released by Tommy Boy/Reprise and was the last Tommy Boy title to be distributed by major-label channels (WEA in this case), although Warner Bros. Records owned a stake in the label until 2002. The track "300bps N, 8, 1 (Terminal Mode Or Ascii Download)" is actually a text file encoded as modem tones. When decoded, the content is a tale by Kurt Harland about a bizarre but purportedly true event that took place when the band was playing in the city of Curitiba, Brazil.

== Track listing ==
All songs written by Paul Robb except for 5 and 11 written by Kurt Harland.

1. "Peace & Love, Inc." — 5:00
2. "Going, Going, Gone" — 4:53
3. "To the City" — 3:30
4. "Made to Be Broken" — 4:25
5. "Still Here" — 4:48
6. "1,000,000 Watts of Love" — 4:22
7. "Where Would I Be Without IBM" — 4:28
8. "To Be Free" — 3:50
9. "If It's Real" — 4:33
10. "Crybaby" — 5:10
11. "Where the I Divides" — 8:15
12. "300bps N, 8, 1 (Terminal Mode or Ascii Download)" — 3:00

== Personnel ==
- Paul Robb
- James Cassidy
- Kurt Harland
