= What's on Your Mind (Pure Energy) =

1988 song by Information Society

Single by Information Society

from the album Information Society
- Released: April 26, 1988
- Genre: Synth-pop; new wave; acid house
- Length: 4:33 (album version); 3:36 (single version)
- Label: Tommy Boy – TB 911
- Songwriters: Paul Robb; Kurt Harland
- Producer: Fred Maher

Information Society singles chronology
"Running" (1985)	"What's on Your Mind (Pure Energy)" (1988)	"Walking Away" (1989)

Audio sample
- "Pure Energy": file; help

Music video
- "What's on Your Mind (Pure Energy)" on YouTube

"What's on Your Mind (Pure Energy)" is a song by American synth-pop band Information Society that was released as a single in 1988. The "Pure Energy" subtitle derives from a sample of Leonard Nimoy's voice from the Star Trek episode "Errand of Mercy". There are also samples of DeForest Kelley (the character Dr. McCoy) in the song's introduction, saying, "it's worked so far, but we're not out yet." and Richard Tatro's (The Android Norman) voices from the episode "I, Mudd".

== Composition ==
The song started out as a 10-minute instrumental jam, when Information Society was trying to record their first album. Tommy Boy Records grew frustrated that the band was spending so much money in the studio but had nothing to show for it, and pressured them to make a hit. Paul Robb came up with a chorus he said was partly inspired by "Sledgehammer" by Peter Gabriel, as well as Duran Duran. After the chorus, he wrote verses with Kurt Harland.

Robb emulated minimalist new wave artists such as Gary Numan and Devo by trying to write lyrics that "said as little as possible". He said the verses were "just sort of a random collection of emotional impressions. ... But when you look back at it now, it's a clear narrative about the difficulty that people have communicating with each other. At the time, we weren't writing it with that in mind, but it's so clear when you just read through the lyrics. It's a very simple and very clear-cut story."

== Release ==
The song was a big hit in the US, spending 25 weeks on the Billboard Hot 100, peaking at number three in October 1988. The single was certified gold by the RIAA on January 18, 1989, selling 500,000 copies.

== Critical reception ==
John Leland of Spin magazine called it a "pretty potent dance record".

In 2009, VH1 ran a countdown of the 100 Greatest One Hit Wonders of the '80s. Information Society's "What's on Your Mind (Pure Energy)" placed at number 74 on the countdown.

== Appearances ==
The song was featured in the feature films Loverboy and American Psycho. A remixed version was included in American Psycho's soundtrack. The song was featured in Grand Theft Auto VI's Vice City FM.

== Radio incident ==
In 1989, Pittsburgh radio station WYDD-FM played this song non-stop in a loop for 25½ hours — focusing on a repeat of the "Pure Energy" sample from Leonard Nimoy as Star Trek's Mr. Spock. The marketing stunt caused listeners to call emergency services, concerned that some calamity had befallen the DJs and other station employees. Bob Hank, general manager at the time, told reporters he was only trying to draw attention to the station's switch in format and new call letters WNRJ (N-R-J = "energy"), adding: "We never dreamed it would go this far."

== Track listings ==
=== 1988 ===
==== 7": Tommy Boy * London / 886 420-7 (Netherlands) ====
1. "What's on Your Mind (Pure Energy)" (Pure Energy Radio Edit) – 3:35
2. "What's on Your Mind (Pure Energy)" (Club Radio Edit) – 3:15

==== 12": Tommy Boy / TB 911 (US) ====
1. "What's on Your Mind (Pure Energy)" (Club Mix) – 8:00
2. "What's on Your Mind (Pure Energy)" (The 54 Mix) – 5:12
3. "What's on Your Mind (Pure Energy)" (Percappella) – 4:09
4. "What's on Your Mind (Pure Energy)" (Pure Energy Mix) – 4:33
5. "What's on Your Mind (Pure Energy)" (What's on Your Dub Mix) – 6:22
- tracks 1–3 remixed by "Little" Louie Vega, Roman Ricardo
- track four is the album version.
- also available on MC (TBC 911)
- also available on CD (TBCD 911)

==== 12": London / LONX 211 (UK) ====
1. "What's on Your Mind (Pure Energy)" (Club Mix) – 8:00
2. "What's on Your Mind (Pure Energy)" (Pure Energy Mix) – 4:33
3. "What's on Your Mind (Pure Energy)" (What's on Your Dub Mix) – 6:22
- also available on CD (LONCD 211)

=== 1998 ===
==== 12": Cleopatra Records CLP 0327 ====
Side A

1. "What's on Your Mind" (Girl Eats Boy Mix)
2. "What's on Your Mind" (Remixed by David J of Love & Rockets)

Side B

1. "What's on Your Mind" (Remixed by Christian B./Daren Kramer for CKB Production)
2. "What's on Your Mind" (Remixed by Judson Leach and Exhibition)
- All of these remixes would make a second appearance on the remix album InSoc Recombinant.

=== 2001 ===
==== CD single: Tommy Boy silver label ====
1. "What's on Your Mind (Pure Energy)" (Pure Energy 2001 Edit) – 3:48
2. "What's on Your Mind (Pure Energy)" (Boris & Beck Exit Edit) – 3:58
3. "What's on Your Mind (Pure Energy)" (Junior's Blue Zone Club Mix) – 9:08
4. "What's on Your Mind (Pure Energy)" (Boris & Beck Exit Mix) – 8:46
5. "What's on Your Mind (Pure Energy)" (Sugarpussy Psychic Funk Mix) – 6:38

== Personnel ==
Credits adapted from the liner notes of Information Society.

=== Information Society ===
- Paul Robb – keyboards and programming, arrangements
- Kurt Valaquen – samples
- James Cassidy – bass, keyboards
- Amanda Kramer – keyboards, synthesizers

=== Technical ===
- Fred Maher – production, mixing, recording engineering, arrangements, programming
- Roey Shamir – mixing, mix engineering
- Kevin Laffey – executive production
- Oz Fritz – engineering assistance
- Angela Piva – engineering assistance
- Herb Powers Jr. – mastering

=== Artwork ===
- Grey Organisation – art direction
- Isabel Snyder – photography
- Steven Miglio – layout
- Daniel Shapiro – typography

== Charts ==
Chart (1988–1989)	Peak position
Canada RPM Canadian Dance Chart	2
Canada RPM 30 Retail Singles	6
Canada Canadian Singles Chart	11
Canada RPM Top Singles	14
Canada Much Music Countdown	19
Ireland IRMA	18
UK Singles Chart	81
US Billboard Hot 100	3
US Hot Dance Music/Club Play	1
US Hot Dance Music/Maxi-Singles Sales	2
US Modern Rock Tracks	10
US Cashbox	3
US Radio & Records	4

=== Year-end charts ===
Chart (1988)	Position
Canada Dance/Urban (RPM)	10
US Billboard Hot 100	52

== See also ==
- List of number-one dance singles of 1988 (U.S.)
