= Hello World (Information Society album) =

Studio album by Information Society
- Released: September 23, 2014
- Recorded: 2014
- Length: 44:03
- Label: Hakatak

Information Society chronology
Land of the Blind (2014)	Hello World (2014)	Encode! Classic Remixes, Vol. 3 (2015)

Hello World (stylized as _hello world) is an album by the electronic band Information Society. It is a return to the band's "classic" 1980s lineup.

== Track listing ==
1. "Land of the Blind" – 3:49
2. "The Prize" – 4:00
3. "Where Were You?" – 3:51
4. "Get Back" – 4:09
5. "Jonestown" – 3:30
6. "Dancing with Strangers" – 4:35
7. "Beautiful World" (featuring Gerald Casale) – 3:32
8. "Creatures of Light and Darkness" – 4:26
9. "Above and Below" – 3:53
10. "Let It Burn" – 4:35
11. "Tomorrow the World" – 3:12

There is an unlisted track 12 (which is unnamed, but shows up on the Internet as Blackman-Harris FFT 1K-10K Linear). When rendered using a spectrogram, it provides a URL and login credentials for a "Secret Content" website where three additional songs can be downloaded in 320 kbit/s MP3 format:

- "Praying to the Aliens" – 4:09
- "Dancing with Strangers" (Kurt's DoomVox Mix) – 4:35
- "Fly Like an Eagle" – 3:37

== Personnel ==
- Kurt Harland
- Paul Robb
- James Cassidy
- Gerald Casale – vocals on "Beautiful World"
