= Lay All Your Love on Me =

1981 single by ABBA

Single by ABBA

from the album Super Trouper
- B-side: "On and On and On"
- Released: 10 July 1981
- Recorded: September–October 1980
- Genre: Dance-pop; electro-disco
- Length: 4:32
- Label: Polar; Epic (UK); Polydor (Germany and Netherlands); Vogue (France)
- Songwriters: Benny Andersson; Björn Ulvaeus
- Producers: Benny Andersson; Björn Ulvaeus

ABBA singles chronology
"Andante, Andante" (1981)	"Lay All Your Love on Me" (1981)	"One of Us" (1981)

Lyric video
- "Lay All Your Love on Me" on YouTube

DiscoNet 12" extended remix 1981

"Lay All Your Love on Me" is a song recorded by the Swedish pop group ABBA for their seventh studio album, Super Trouper (1980). The song features lead vocals by Agnetha Fältskog. It was originally not intended as a single by Polar Music, the group's label, but a remix version of the track gained major popularity in nightclubs. As a result, "Lay All Your Love on Me" was released on 10 July 1981, as Super Trouper's sixth and final single, only in certain territories and only as a 12-inch single.

"Lay All Your Love on Me" became a chart success, charting at number seven on the UK singles chart and becoming the then-highest selling 12-inch single in UK chart history. In the United States, the song peaked atop the Billboard Dance Club Songs chart. It has gone on to become one of the group's most enduring hits. Slant Magazine ranked the song at number 60 in their list of the greatest dance songs of all time in 2006, and number 66 in the revised 2020 list.

== Composition ==
"Lay All Your Love on Me" is an electro-disco song penned by Benny Andersson and Björn Ulvaeus, with Agnetha Fältskog singing lead. Recording began at Polar Music Studios in Stockholm on 9 September 1980, with the final mix of the song being completed on 10 October 1980. It is known for a descending vocal sound at the end of the verse immediately preceding the refrain. This was achieved by sending the vocal into a harmoniser device, which was set up to produce a slightly lower-pitched version of the vocal. In turn its output was fed back to its input, thereby continually lowering the pitch of the vocal. Andersson and Ulvaeus felt that the chorus of the song sounded like a hymn, so parts of the vocals in the choruses were run through a vocoder, to recreate the sound of a church congregation singing, slightly out of tune. The song was not originally intended to be released as a single, but was issued in 12-inch form in the UK and a few other countries in 1981. "Lay All Your Love on Me" has since been much covered and is also featured in the Mamma Mia! musical (and its film adaptation), that showcases many of ABBA's hits.

== Music video ==
ABBA did not film a promotional video for "Lay All Your Love on Me", and so Epic hastily assembled a video (at a cost of £3,500) by using excerpts from the existing ABBA videos for "Take a Chance on Me", "Summer Night City", "The Name of the Game", "I Have a Dream", "Voulez-Vous" and "The Winner Takes It All". It was never shown on TV because Epic managers thought it "wasn't needed", but was included on the ABBA Gold VHS.

== Release ==
"Lay All Your Love on Me" was originally not intended as a single release. However, in 1981, a remixed version of the track by Raul A. Rodriguez, otherwise known as C.O.D of Disconet, was released and became a hit in nightclubs, enough so that it ended up topping the US Billboard Dance Club Songs chart along with "Super Trouper" and "On and On and On". This success resulted in Polar Music releasing the track as a single in selected territories and only as a 12-inch single, as opposed to the standard 7-inch record.

== Commercial performance ==
In the United Kingdom, "Lay All Your Love on Me" debuted at number 19 on the UK singles chart the week of 18 July 1981, and rose to its peak position of number seven the following week; alternatively, it peaked at number five on the NME charts. Although it was their lowest-charting hit since "I Do, I Do, I Do, I Do, I Do", "Lay All Your Love on Me" would become the first ever song to reach the top ten in the UK based solely on 12-inch sales. It would become the group's seventeenth consecutive top-ten hit, and eighteenth overall. At the time, it was the best selling 12-inch single in history, later surpassed by "Blue Monday" from New Order. As of September 2021, it is ABBA's 17th-biggest song in the UK, including both pure sales and digital streams.

Because of the limited release, "Lay All Your Love on Me" charted in only a few regions. In West Germany, the song debuted at number 35 on the German Singles Chart the week of 17 August 1981, and peaked at number 26, becoming the first single since "Voulez-Vous" to miss the top ten in the country. In Ireland, the single peaked at number eight on the Irish Singles Chart, becoming the group's eighteenth consecutive top ten single. In Belgium, it peaked at number 13 on the Ultratop 50.

== Legacy ==
In 2006, Slant Magazine ranked "Lay All Your Love on Me" No. 60 in their list of the greatest dance songs of all time, and No. 66 in the updated 2020 list. In September 2024, Swedish national radio Sveriges Radio P3 ranked it among the world's 300 best songs.

== Personnel ==
- Agnetha Fältskog – lead vocals
- Anni-Frid Lyngstad – backing vocals
- Benny Andersson – keyboards, synthesizers, backing vocals
- Björn Ulvaeus – guitar, backing vocals
- Lasse Wellander – guitar
- Rutger Gunnarsson – bass
- Ola Brunkert – drums
- Harry Bisset – piano and vocals

== Charts ==
=== Weekly charts ===
Chart (1981)	Peak position
Belgium (Ultratop 50 Flanders)	13
Ireland (IRMA)	8
UK Singles (NME)	5
UK Singles (Official Charts)	7
US Dance Club Songs (Billboard) with "Super Trouper" and "On and On and On"	1
West Germany (GfK)	26

2007 weekly chart performance for "Lay All Your Love on Me"
Chart (2007)	Peak position
Russia Airplay (TopHit)	110

Chart (2020–2021)	Peak position
Sweden (Sverigetopplistan)	68
UK Singles Sales (OCC)	10
UK Physical Singles (OCC)	4
UK Vinyl Singles (OCC)	1

Chart (2025)	Peak position
Netherlands (Single Tip)	10
UK Singles Sales (OCC)	11
UK Physical Singles (OCC)	2
UK Vinyl Singles (OCC)	2

Chart (2026)	Peak position
Netherlands (Single Tip)	24
UK Singles Sales (OCC)	17
UK Physical Singles (OCC)	5
UK Vinyl Singles (OCC)	5

=== Year-end charts ===
Chart (1981)	Position
US Dance Club Songs (Billboard) with "Super Trouper" and "On and On and On"	14

== Release history ==
Region	Date	Title	Label	Format	Catalogue
Netherlands, West Germany	3 Jul 1981	"Lay All Your Love On Me" / "On And On And On"	Polydor	12-inch vinyl	2141 397
UK, Ireland	13 Jul 1981	"Lay All Your Love On Me" / "On And On And On"	Epic	12-inch vinyl	EPC A 13 1456
France	1981	"Lay All Your Love On Me" / "On And On And On"	Vogue	12-inch vinyl	310922
USA	1981	"Lay All Your Love On Me" / "On And On And On"	Atlantic	12-inch vinyl, promo	DMD 259
Brazil	1981	"Lay All Your Love On Me" / "On And On And On"	RCA Victor	12-inch vinyl, promo	100.8063
Japan	1981	"Lay All Your Love On Me" / "Super Trouper"	Discomate	12-inch vinyl, promo	DSS-1008
Japan	1981	"Lay All Your Love On Me"	Discomate	7-inch vinyl, promo, single-sided	DSS-11
Netherlands, West Germany	1988	"Lay All Your Love On Me" / "The Day Before You Came" / "Cassandra" / "Under Attack"	Polydor	CD	871 115-2
Europe	30 Oct 2020	"Lay All Your Love On Me" / "On And On And On"	Polar	7-inch vinyl, picture disc	0602508778643
Europe	7 Feb 2025	"Lay All Your Love On Me" / "I’ve Been Waiting For You"	Polar	7-inch vinyl, shaped disc	00602475143727
Worldwide	14 Feb 2025	"Lay All Your Love On Me"	Polar	Streaming	
Europe	6 Feb 2026	"Lay All Your Love On Me" / "My Love, My Life"	Polar	10-inch vinyl, picture disc	00602488280075

== Certifications ==
=== Original version ===
Region	Certification	Certified units/sales
Denmark (IFPI Danmark)	Platinum	90,000^{‡}
Germany (BVMI)	Gold	300,000^{‡}
Italy (FIMI) sales from 2009	Gold	50,000^{‡}
New Zealand (RMNZ)	Platinum	30,000^{‡}
Spain (Promusicae)	Gold	30,000^{‡}
United Kingdom (BPI)	Platinum	600,000^{‡}
^{‡} Sales+streaming figures based on certification alone.

=== Mamma Mia! version ===
Region	Certification	Certified units/sales
New Zealand (RMNZ)	Platinum	30,000^{‡}
United Kingdom (BPI)	Gold	400,000^{‡}
^{‡} Sales+streaming figures based on certification alone.

== Notable cover versions ==
=== Information Society version ===
"Lay All Your Love on Me"

Single by Information Society

from the album Information Society
- Released: 1989
- Label: Tommy Boy
- Songwriters: Benny Andersson; Björn Ulvaeus

Information Society singles chronology
"Repetition" (1989)	"Lay All Your Love on Me" (1989)	"Think" (1990)

"Lay All Your Love on Me" was covered by American synth-pop band Information Society on their 1988 first album Information Society. The track peaked at No. 83 on the US Billboard Hot 100 in 1989. It was later included on the compilation ABBA: A Tribute – The 25th Anniversary Celebration.

Track listing

1. "Lay All Your Love on Me" (Justin Strauss Remix)
2. "Lay All Your Love on Me" (Restricted Re-mix)
3. "Lay All Your Love on Me" (Prohibited Dub)
4. "Lay All Your Love on Me" (Radio Hot Mix)
5. "Lay All Your Love on Me" (Phil Harding Metal Mega-Mix)
6. "Funky at 45"
