= Running (Information Society song) =

Single by Information Society

from the album Creatures of Influence
- Released: 1985
- Genre: Freestyle
- Length: 8:03 (main version); 3:07 (video mix)
- Label: Wide Angle Records
- Songwriter: Murat Konar
- Producer: Paul Robb

Information Society singles chronology
"Running" (1985)	"What's on Your Mind (Pure Energy)" (1988)

Music video
- "Running" on YouTube

"Running" is the debut single by the band InSoc (Information Society) originally released on the Creatures of Influence album in 1985.

In early 2008, Murat Konar joined Paul Robb, Jim Cassidy, and Kurt Harland onstage in San Francisco to sing "Running".

In 2001, Running was released exclusively for the North American market, with remixes by Victor Calderone e Robbie Rivera, through Tommy Boy Records.

== Track listings ==
12" single (1985)

1. "Running"
2. "Running" (instrumental)

12" and CD maxi-single (1986)

1. "Running" (vocal remix) (7:41)
2. "Running" (percappella) (3:55)
3. "Running" ("The Nest" remix) (5:25)
4. "Running" (instrumental) (7:42)
- Remixed by Joey Gardner and "Little Louie" Vega.
- The "Vocal Remix" is the same as the version featured on the album.

CD maxi-single: Tommy Boy Silver Label (2001)

1. "Running" (Calderone Leather radio edit)
2. "Running" (Robbie Rivera Diskofied vocal edit)
3. "Running" (Calderone Leather mix)
4. "Running" (Robbie Rivera Diskofied vocal mix)
5. "Running" (Robbie Rivera Smooth House mix)
- The 12" single release also featured the "Calderone Dub".
- A dub version by Robbie Rivera of unknown origin also exists.

Running 2K14 Remixes (2014)

- AM Remixes
1. "Running 2K14" (Lem Spingsteen Soulful House mix)
2. "Running 2K14" (Alias Rhythm remix)
3. "Running 2K14" (Todd Terry remix)
4. "Running 2K14" (Eric Kupper mix)
5. "Running 2K14" (Lem Springsteen & Drew Kingsbury Strobelight mix)
6. "Running 2K14" (Todd Terry dub)
- PM Remixes
1. "Running 2K14" (Marcos Carnaval & Paulo Jeveaux club mix)
2. "Running 2K14" (David Anthony mix)
3. "Running 2K14" (Chachi remix)
4. "Running 2K14" (Dezza remix)
5. "Running 2K14" (Rudedog NY remix)
6. "Running 2K14" (Marcos Carnaval & Paulo Jeveaux Tribal mix)
