= Death Jr. II: Root of Evil =

2006 video game

- North American PSP cover art
- Developer: Backbone Entertainment
- Publishers: Konami; Eidos (Wii)
- Platforms: PlayStation Portable, Wii
- Release: PSP: NA: October 31, 2006; EU: April 27, 2007; AU: May 4, 2007; Wii: NA: May 27, 2008; EU: May 30, 2008
- Genre: Action adventure
- Modes: Single-player, multiplayer

Death Jr. II: Root of Evil is a 2006 action-adventure game developed by Backbone Entertainment and the sequel to Death Jr. The game has various differences from the first, including having a second playable character, Pandora. It also introduced cooperative play with one player as DJ and the other as Pandora.

== Reception ==
Reception

Aggregate scores
Aggregator	Score
GameRankings	(Wii) 70.61% (PSP) 70.36%
Metacritic	(Wii) 71/100 (PSP) 68/100

Review scores
Publication	Score
1Up.com	(Wii) B (PSP) C+
Electronic Gaming Monthly	6.33/10
Game Informer	(PSP) 8.25/10 (Wii) 7.25/10
GamePro	4/5
GameSpot	(Wii) 6.5/10 (PSP) 6.4/10
GameSpy	(Wii) 4.5/5 (PSP) 3/5
GameTrailers	6.7/10
GameZone	6/10
IGN	(Wii) 7.4/10 (PSP) 7.1/10
Nintendo Power	7/10
Official U.S. PlayStation Magazine	6/10

The game was given mixed, but generally positive reviews. Detroit Free Press criticized the game's uninteresting combat and poor camera controls. While Game Informer noted that "the original Death Jr. title, despite its clever characters and cool setting, was hamstrung by iffy level design and a poor camera. This sequel addresses both of those problems magnificently, and lets the off-beat tone and refreshingly unique universe reach their full potential. Though not without its problems, Death Jr. 2 successfully delivers on the unfulfilled promise of the first game."
