= Don't Be Afraid (album) =

Studio album by Information Society
- Released: September 23, 1997
- Recorded: 1992–1997
- Studio: Fred Maher's studio (Los Angeles); Steve Seibold's studio (San Clemente); Kurt Harland's home studio (San Francisco)
- Genre: Industrial; dark ambient
- Length: 59:46
- Label: Cleopatra; Accession
- Producer: Kurt Harland; Fred Maher; Steven Seibold

Information Society chronology
| Peace and Love, Inc. (1992) | Don't Be Afraid (1997) | InSoc Recombinant (1999) |

Professional ratings
Review scores
| Source | Rating |
|---|---|
| AllMusic | 2/5 stars |

Don't Be Afraid is a 1997 album by electro/synthpop group Information Society. The album adds industrial elements and guitars. The album was recorded with Kurt Harland remaining the sole member of the band, featuring collaborators Fred Maher and Steve Siebold of Hate Dept. The album features a more conceptual sound unlike past material, with Harland describing the album's themes as "extremes of emotion and sensation". The eighth track, "Ozar Midrashim", is used extensively in the video game Legacy of Kain: Soul Reaver, as the theme of the main character Raziel.

== Background ==
According to Kurt Harland's Insoc.org website, the oldest work on the album is the first version of "Closing In", which dates back to 1992. Most tracks on the album have had previous iterations and versions, with these tracks being updated over the years. Harland initially worked with Fred Maher in 1996 on some of the first tracks of the album; Steve Seibold of Hate Dept. joined in January 1997 taking Maher's place and collaborated by playing guitar, producing and mixing on a number of tracks. This album is the first and only Information Society album to feature guitars, which are used on several tracks.

== Artwork ==
In 1999, Accession Records released a new edition of the album Don't Be Afraid, featuring a different cover and booklet from the original 1997 version. The change was made because the original cover was considered "heavy" and "aggressive" to many fans.

== Track listing ==
All tracks are written by Kurt Harland, except where noted.

| No. | Title | Writer(s) | Length |
|---|---|---|---|
| 1. | "Empty 3.0" | | 8:32 |
| 2. | "Closing In 2.0" | | 8:11 |
| 3. | "On the Outside 2.1" | | 6:46 |
| 4. | "Ending World 1.1" | | 5:31 |
| 5. | "Seek300 2.11" | | 4:29 |
| 6. | "The Sky Away 2.0" | | 3:59 |
| 7. | "Are 'Friends' Electric? 2.0" | Gary Numan | 5:41 |
| 8. | "Ozar Midrashim 1.1" | | 6:52 |
| 9. | "The Ridge 1.1" | | 8:41 |
| 10. | "White Roses 1.1 (300 8-N-1 Terminal Mode or ASCII download)" (modem noise) | | 0:56 |

Don't Be Afraid V.1.3 rerelease
| No. | Title | Writer(s) | Length |
|---|---|---|---|
| 10. | "White Roses 1.0" | | 7:59 |
| 11. | "Kebabträume 1.0" | Robert Görl | 5:23 |

== Other releases ==
- Accession Records released a version of the album featuring different artwork and inserts in 1999.
- The album was remastered and re-released on April 1, 2008, as a digital download in the iTunes and Amazon music stores.

== Personnel ==
Credits adapted from the album's liner notes.

=== Information Society ===
- Kurt Harland – vocals, programming

=== Guests ===
- Fred Maher – guitar on track 5
- Steven Seibold – guitar on tracks 2–4 and 9, drums on tracks 2, 6, and 9, programming
- Rachel Girard – vocals on track 6

=== Production ===
- Tracks 1–4, 6, and 9 produced and mixed by Steven Seibold, recorded at Seibold Studios.
- Tracks 5 and 7 produced and mixed by Fred Maher, recorded at Fred Maher's studio.
- Tracks 8, 10 and 11 produced and mixed by Kurt Harland, recorded in KurtsCar.
