= Think (Information Society song) =

Single by Information Society

from the album Hack
- Released: 1990
- Genre: Dance-pop
- Length: 3:59
- Label: Tommy Boy Records
- Songwriter: Paul Robb

Information Society singles chronology
"Lay All Your Love On Me" (1989)	"Think" (1990)	"How Long" (1991)

Music video
- "Think" on YouTube

"Think" is a song by American electronic band Information Society, released in 1990 by Tommy Boy Records, as the first single from their second album, Hack (1990). The song peaked at numbers 24 and 28 on the US Cash Box Top 100 and Billboard Hot 100 charts, and number five on the Billboard Hot Dance Club Play chart. The accompanying music video was directed by English director Peter Hewitt.

== Track listing ==
- CD single
1. Think (Hack radio edit) – 3:58
2. Think (Virtual Reality radio edit) – 4:15
3. Think (Bluebox 2600 mix) – 6:50
4. Think (Virtual Reality Mix) – 7:04
5. Think (Phone Phreak Mix) – 6:24
6. Think (Mindmeld Mix) – 5:19
7. Think (Phone Phreak dub) – 4:54
- 12" single
1. Think (Virtual Reality radio edit) – 4:15
2. Think (Bluebox 2600 mix) – 6:50
3. Think (Virtual Reality Mix) – 7:04
4. Think (Phone Phreak Mix) – 6:24
5. Think (Acappella) – 2:05
- Cassette single
1. Think (Hack radio edit) – 3:58
2. Think (Virtual Reality radio edit) – 4:15
- Cassette Maxi-Single
1. Think (Virtual Reality radio edit) – 4:15
2. Think (Bluebox 2600 mix) – 6:50
3. Think (Virtual Reality Mix) – 7:04
4. Think (Phone Phreak Mix) – 6:24
5. Think (Virtual Reality Dub)

== Charts ==
Chart performance for "Think"
Chart (1991)	Peak position
Australia (ARIA)	132
Dutch Singles Chart	20
US Billboard Hot 100	28
US Hot Dance Club Play (Billboard)	5
US Cash Box Top 100	24
