= Information Society (band) =

American band

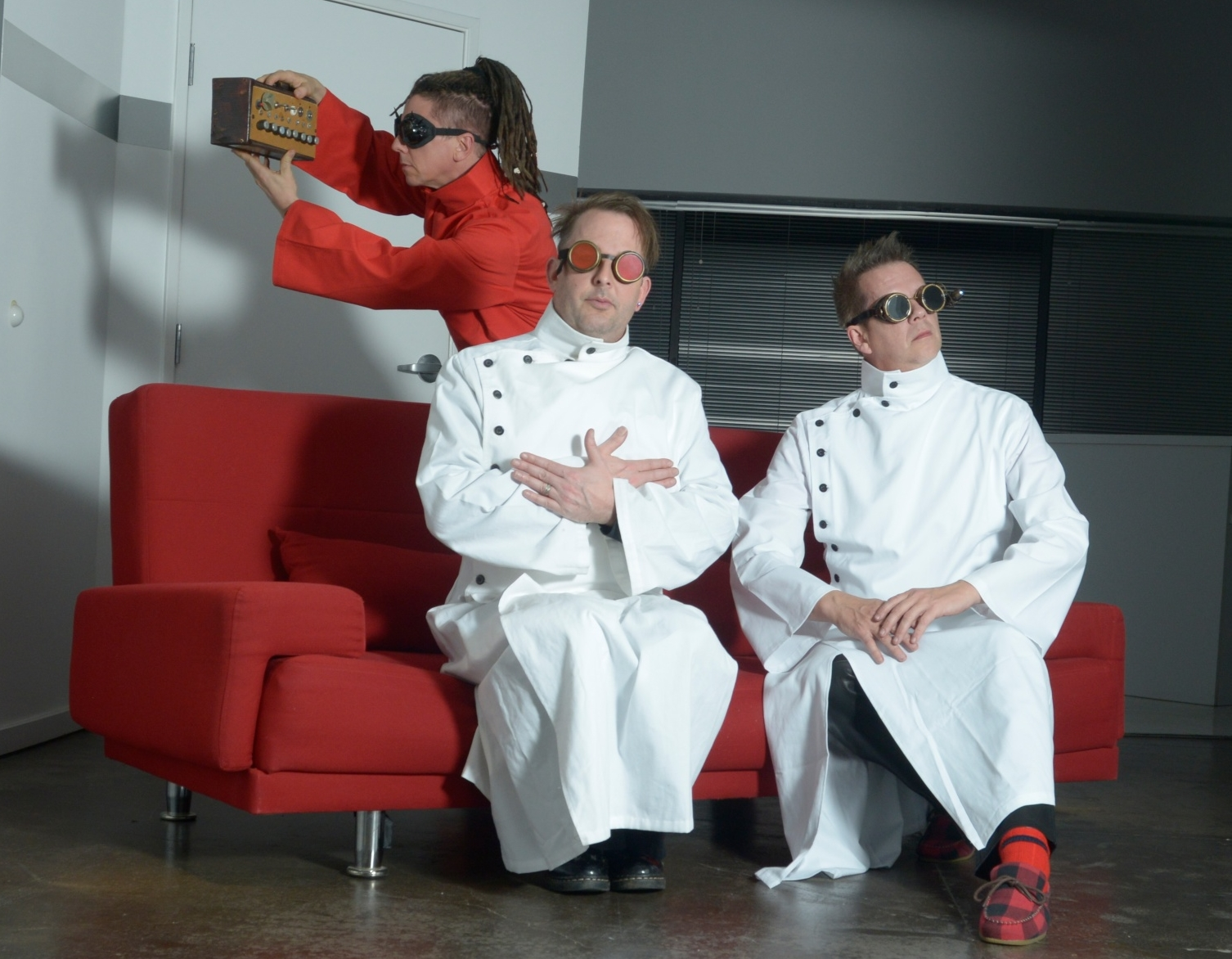
- Information Society, 2014: (from left to right) Kurt Harland, Jim Cassidy, Paul Robb

Background information
- Origin: Saint Paul, Minnesota, U.S.
- Genres: Synth-pop; freestyle; new wave; electro-industrial
- Years active: 1982–1997; 2006–present
- Labels: Twin/Tone; Tommy Boy/Reprise/Warner Bros.; Cleopatra; Dancing Ferret
- Members: Paul Robb; James Cassidy; Kurt Harland Larson
- Past members: See "Band members"
- Website: informationsociety.us

Information Society (also known as InSoc) is an American electronic band from Minneapolis–Saint Paul, Minnesota, initially active from 1982 to 1997, primarily consisting of Paul Robb, James Cassidy and Kurt Harland Larson; the former two reconvened the band in 2006, initially with Christopher Anton as lead vocalist, then with Harland rejoining them as lead vocalist by 2008.

The group's breakout single was 1988's "What's on Your Mind (Pure Energy)", a dance song that spent 39 weeks on the dance chart, going straight to number one and also peaking at number three on the Hot 100 pop chart. The track included a vocal sample of Mr. Spock (Leonard Nimoy) from Star Trek, saying "pure energy".

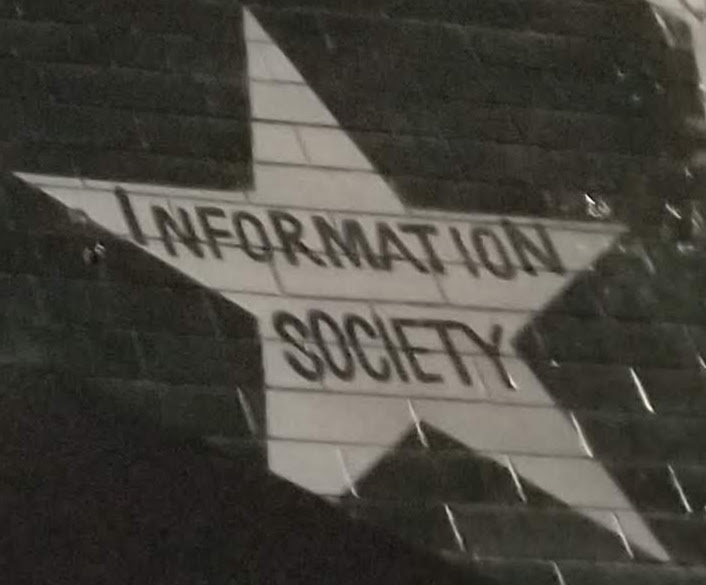
Information Society's star on the outside mural of Minneapolis nightclub First Avenue

The band has been honored with a star on the outside mural of the Minneapolis nightclub First Avenue, recognizing performers that have played sold-out shows or have otherwise demonstrated a major contribution to the culture at the iconic venue. Receiving a star "might be the most prestigious public honor an artist can receive in Minneapolis," according to journalist Steve Marsh.

== History ==
=== Founding, influences, and initial albums (1982–1992) ===
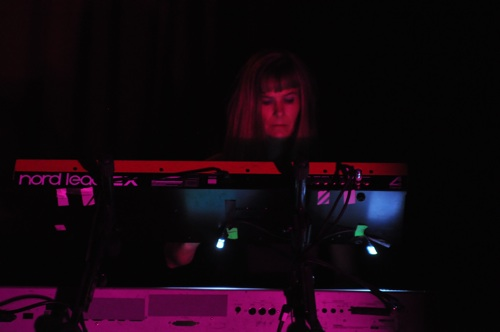
Amanda Kramer – Keyboardist from 1986 to 1988

The band was formed in Harland's dormitory room in Dupre Hall at Macalester College in Saint Paul, Minnesota, in 1982, and they performed avant-garde electronic music with flourishes of hip hop, dub, and electro. The name was chosen partly after Ingsoc, the newspeak term for English socialism in George Orwell's dystopian novel Nineteen Eighty-Four. The group were initially influenced by acts such as Kraftwerk, Gary Numan and Deutsch Amerikanische Freundschaft (D.A.F.), thereafter developing an admiration for the likes of Pet Shop Boys, Duran Duran and OMD. In 1983, the band independently released The InSoc EP and Creatures of Influence.

Two years later, the group released ‘Running’, its first single, which became a hit in New York City's Latin dance clubs and helped establish their presence. The extended seven-minute song was written and sung by Murat Konar, who left the band soon afterward. It was released on the Twin Cities-based label Twin-Tone Records, which was known for rock music rather than dance music. Its growing success led the group to move from its native Minneapolis–Saint Paul to New York City, and the ensuing revenues and contacts, as well as the addition of keyboardist Amanda Kramer to the lineup, led the group to record its proper debut album for Tommy Boy Records, which bought out the group's Twin-Tone contract because of its expertise in street-oriented music.

InSoc was the only Tommy Boy act to have all of its albums released through major-label distribution channels rather than independent distribution, since the label, a former subsidiary of Warner Bros. Records, had that option available to it throughout its years as a Warner subsidiary. In this case, Warner sub-label Reprise Records was the distributor. The group's 12-inch vinyl singles, however, were distributed through independent channels.

In addition to "What's on Your Mind (Pure Energy)", the group's self-titled major release debut Information Society (1988) also produced another Top 10 Billboard entry in "Walking Away" which reached number five on the dance chart and number nine on the Hot 100 chart. Kramer left the band shortly after. A third single, the ballad "Repetition" managed to reach number 76 on the Hot 100 also. The fourth single from the album was a cover of ABBA's "Lay All Your Love on Me" which reached number 23 on the dance chart and number 83 on the Hot 100.

The audio samples from Star Trek were authorized for use on the album partially thanks to the efforts of Adam Nimoy, a fan of the band and son of Star Trek's Leonard Nimoy. The album sold out its initial pressing in the United States in two weeks. Information Society peaked at number 25 on the Billboard 200, and was certified gold within five months of its release in the US. The disc was one of the few to use CD+G, which included digital graphics on the compact disc version in addition to the music. The graphics for the CD+G portion can be seen on the Information Society website along with computer-based information which has been included on other releases. The songs "What's On Your Mind (Pure Energy)" and "Walking Away" were used in a sampler disc bundled with the Sega CD to showcase the console's CD+G capability, using the same graphics as the album.

During this time, the band released an anonymous single (composed of two tracks from their forthcoming second album) under the name Think Tank. Years later, Robb would release tracks under the name Think Tank through the formerly-fictional record label Hakatak.

Information Society made a guest appearance on the soap opera "General Hospital" in 1990, performing their hit song "What's on Your Mind (Pure Energy)." This crossover helped introduce their music to a broader audience beyond the typical music scene.

Their song, the instrumental track "Hit Me", was placed on the soundtrack to the science-fiction comedy film Earth Girls Are Easy. By 1989, Information Society joined the "Club MTV Tour" that also included Paula Abdul, Milli Vanilli, Tone Loc, Was (Not Was) and Lisa Lisa.

The second release, Hack (1990), was not as successful, but had a top 40 entry with "Think", which also went to number five on the Dance Club/Play Songs list. "How Long" went to number 20 on the Dance Club/Play Songs list. The album managed to sell quite well in late 1990, staying on the Billboard charts for 14 weeks, peaking at number 77. Music videos were produced for those two tracks, but only "Think" got video airplay; the Adam Ant-directed spot for "How Long" was put aside as nobody involved was happy with it. A third single, "Now That I Have You", was remixed and sent out to DJs but was never released. In January 1991 the band performed at the Rock In Rio II festival in front of 190,000 fans at the Maracanã Stadium.

The group's third release, Peace and Love, Inc. (1992), proved to be more powerful and critically acclaimed, although its label failed to do much to promote it despite featuring production by Karl Bartos of German electronic music band Kraftwerk. The first single, "Peace & Love Inc.", reached number 10 on the Billboard Dance Chart. A music video was produced for the track, but MTV declined to play it. The album is also notable for being perhaps the first album ever produced to contain a track of modem tones, which, when played into a telephone connected to a computer, resulted in a bonus message from the band. To promote the album, Information Society embarked on a club tour in fall 1992 with Cause and Effect, but the tour was canceled when Cause and Effect frontman Sean Rowley died of complications from an asthma attack during their soundcheck in Minneapolis on November 8, 1992.

=== Don't Be Afraid and Cleopatra Records (1997–1999) ===
In 1997 the band released a fourth album, Don't Be Afraid (1997). Written and performed by Kurt Harland alone and produced by Steven Seibold, DBA was more industrial-driven than previous albums and reflected more of what Harland wanted to do during most of his tenure with InSoc. Cleopatra Records released the album, but — like Tommy Boy Records — did little to promote it. Harland's love of computer-related materials continued to be evident, as the album included a CD-ROM filled with bonus material, not yet a common occurrence in 1997. The disc included a selection of digital samples used in the album's production, miscellaneous works of art by InSoc fans, a program to generate the distinctive border graphics used on the album's cover, and the music video of "Peace & Love, Inc."

There was also a carefully orchestrated digital scavenger hunt culminating in the discovery of a bonus track, "White Roses". The scavenger hunt began with decoding a modem's signal recorded at the end of the audio CD, resulting in a text message from Harland which pointed the way to a website where the search began. There is also a cover included of Gary Numan's "Are 'Friends' Electric?" Also included is "Ozar Midrashim", later used as the main theme for the videogame Soul Reaver. The album eventually went out of print, but it had a second release in a remastered version in 2008, this time with "White Roses" included as an audio track.

A remix album, InSoc Recombinant (1999), was produced, featuring vocals to the band's earlier hits remixed by various artists. The vocals to songs pre-Don't Be Afraid were not the originals, they were new versions re-recorded by Harland alone specifically for the remixers' use. Included on a bonus, unadvertised CD-ROM were digital copies of most of the band's officially produced promotional videos, including a copy of the "Peace and Love Inc." video of higher quality than that distributed with Don't Be Afraid. This CD-ROM, however, did not feature the "How Long" video.

=== Compilations and Bands Reunited (1999–2005) ===
In 2001, strange haircuts // cardboard guitars // and computer samples was released including all the hits from 1988 to 1992.

In 2004, Cleopatra Records released a compilation, Pure Energy. The release consisted of tracks from Don't Be Afraid and InSoc Recombinant, supplemented with a slightly altered mix of "Are Friends Electric?" and two new remixes of "What's On Your Mind", one by Effcee, and one unattributed mix labeled "What's On Your Mind (Pure Energy)" which attempted to emulate the original Tommy Boy version of the track. Robb called the album "an insult to both the band and the fans". Harland, despite being credited as producer in the liner notes, had nothing to do with the release; and while declining to either "endorse or un-endorse" the album, he did take particular issue with the cover art, both for its low quality and for its portrayal of him holding a gun.

The group was featured in an episode of VH1's Bands Reunited in November 2004. As broadcast, it appeared that Aamer Haleem (host of the show) got every member to agree to reuniting. However, Kurt had declined to appear in the planned concert, for reasons he later detailed in a post on the band's official website. The post also details his experiences behind the scenes of the production, and how they differ from the portrayals in the episode as broadcast.

The VH1 show was followed by a period of relative quiet, although Harland, Cassidy, and Robb gave two performances at a weekend music festival in New York City on August 20–21, 2005.

=== Oscillator, Synthesizer, and Modulator releases (2005–2009) ===
In 2006, it was announced that Paul Robb and James Cassidy had decided to reconvene Information Society without Kurt Harland's full participation in the recording process. From Kurt: Harland's absence in the studio line-up was attributed to family and work obligations. Harland ultimately contributed lead vocals to one track, "Seeds of Pain".

The new lineup included Christopher Anton as lead vocalist on Oscillator and Synthesizer and co-wrote several tracks on each including the title track of the latter. They were also joined by Sonja Myers who played additional keyboards and provided a return to female background vocals.

Christopher Anton performed live as the lead singer for Information Society throughout 2006–2008, including shows in California, Oregon, New York, New Jersey, and São Paulo, Brazil. By mid-2007, the band began to return to its original lineup of Harland, Cassidy, and Robb, who performed on July 21, 2007, at the Freestyle Reunion 2 Concert at Madison Square Garden. After the release of Synthesizer, the trio performed a series of concerts in Philadelphia, Seattle, San Francisco and Austin, Texas. The concert in Philadelphia was filmed for the DVD, It Is Useless to Resist Us: 25 Years of Information Society, released on Dancing Ferret Discs.

On 19 March 2007, Information Society self-released an EP, Oscillator, first as an Internet-only release – their first commercial release in over six years. This EP was later released in CD format with an extra audio track and a bonus CD-ROM video track. It includes remixes by the Brazilian duo Kain & Arvy for "I Like The Way You Werk It" (only on CD version) and "Back In The Day" (on both releases). This was followed by the album Synthesizer which was released on October 9 in North America and October 5 in Europe on Dancing Ferret Discs. The album was released digitally in North America and Europe on September 4, 2007. Several live shows in the US followed the album's release.

Information Society commissioned chiptune/micromusic artist 8 Bit Weapon to remix "I Like the Way You Werk It". 8 Bit Weapon remixed the song using both a Commodore 64 computer and a Game Boy Classic handheld console. The remix was titled "I Like the Way You Werk It – 8 Bit Weapon Remix". "I Like the Way You Werk It" was also remixed by LA-based indie promoter and electronica artist Jon Hershfield. The remix is titled "Werk It V.2." Both Robb and Anton have been guests on Hershfield's internet radio program Isgoodmusic.com.

Modulator, an EP of remixes from Synthesizer, was released on Dancing Ferret Discs in digital-only format in September 2009. It was also included in its entirety on the It Is Useless to Resist Us: 25 Years of Information Society DVD released later that year. Notable remixers on the Modulator EP included Dave Aude and Tommie Sunshine. Modulator also included a live version of "Wrongful Death" and a brand new song, "Don't Touch The Devil" with Kurt on vocals.

=== Reformation of classic lineup and subsequent material (2009–present) ===
In September 2014, Information Society released their first album of new material featuring the old Harland/Cassidy/Robb line-up since 1992, Hello World. Robb and Harland worked on this album throughout 2013 and the first half of 2014, as well as another project, still unannounced as of October 1, 2014. This album, with Harland back at lead vocals, brings the band closer to its classic sound, yet with a modern edge. Much like the Easter egg on the last track on Peace and Love, Inc., this album also has a secret track, when rendered using a spectrogram provides a URL and login credentials (now defunct) to 3 bonus tracks.

Information Society released the aforementioned project, Orders of Magnitude on March 11, 2016, again featuring the old Harland/Cassidy/Robb line-up. The album features numerous covers, including "Dominion" by The Sisters of Mercy, "Beautiful World" by Devo (Featuring Gerald V. Casale on vocals), and "Don't You Want Me" by Human League. Other guest artists include Vitamin C, Ayria, and Leila Mack.

The single "Nothing Prevails" was released on the Tommy Boy Records label on June 29, 2018. Two versions were made available: one with vocals in English, and one with vocals in German. A video was also released, featuring mostly still art but with some slight animation. The singles "World Enough" and "Bennington" were released on the Tommy Boy Records label on January 11 and May 17, 2019, respectively.

On August 6, 2021, the band released ODDfellows, their eighth album, in both a standard mix and in THX Spatial Audio, optimized for headphones.

=== Side projects ===
Information Society's members Kurt Harland and Murat Konar's brother Mithat collaborated under the name A.K.A. They recorded two songs ("Cruel Lovin'" sung by Mithat, and "All You Ever Told Were Lies" sung by Harland) that were produced by Harland.

== Artistry ==
Information Society's musical style has been described as synth-pop, freestyle, dance-pop, electronic, new wave, electropop and electro-industrial.

== Band members ==
Information Society is a musical collective which has been recording and performing since 1982.

Current members

- Paul Robb – keyboards, backing vocals (1982–1993, 2004–present)
- James Cassidy – bass, backing vocals, keyboards, percussion (1983–1993, 2004–present)
- Kurt Harland – lead vocals, keyboards, percussion (1982–1999, 2008–present)

Session/touring members

- Zeke "VJ Falcotronik" Prebluda – video production (2008–present)
- Mike Wimer – percussion (2008–present)

Former recording members

- Pamela Tzara/Brustman – keyboards, percussion (1982–1983)
- Kristin (Kaerlin) Leader – keyboards, backing vocals (1983)
- Murat Konar – lead vocals (1984–1985)
- Amanda Kramer – keyboards, percussion (1986–1988)

Former touring members

- Heather LeFay – keyboards (1982)
- Shawntelle Martin – (1984)
- Belinda Beasley – (1984)
- Chris Little – keyboards (1984–1985)
- Lisa Tonra – keyboards (1984–1985)
- Mithat Konar – keyboards (1985)
- Sally Ven-Yu Berg – percussion (1988–1989) (died 2015)
- Ed Potokar – percussion (1989–1991, 2007)
- Ed Wozniak – percussion (1991–1994)
- Sherry Heart – percussion (1991)
- Will Loconto – keyboards (1992–1996)
- Kristoffer Larson – percussion (1993–1996)
- Liam Hart – trumpet (1994–1996)
- Maria Nocera – backing vocals, keyboards (1989–1991)
- Sonja Myers – percussion (2007)
- Christopher Anton – lead vocals (2004–2008)
- Jon Siren – percussion (2014)

== Discography ==
- Information Society (1988)
- Hack (1990)
- Peace and Love, Inc. (1992)
- Don't Be Afraid (1997)
- Synthesizer (2007)
- Hello World (2014)
- Orders of Magnitude (2016)
- ODDfellows (2021)
