= James Cassidy (musician) =

American musician and educator

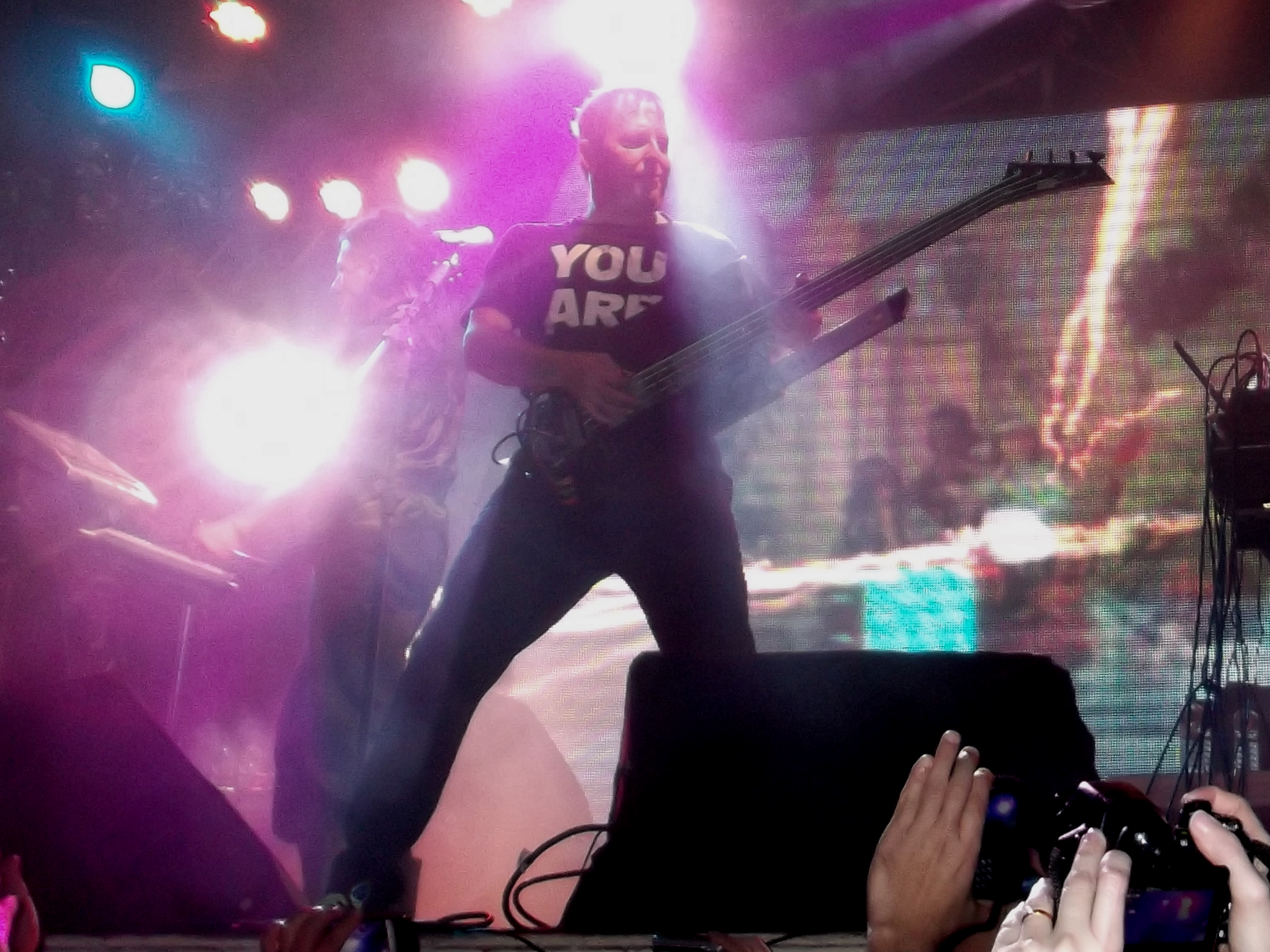
James Cassidy performing live in 2012

James Cassidy is an American musician and educator who is one of the founding members of the band Information Society (InSoc). He played bass and keyboards with the band from its beginning in the early 1980s until 1992, when the group released its final album as a trio, Peace & Love, Inc.

After the band dissolved, Cassidy left the music business and enrolled at Mt. Hood Community College in Gresham, Oregon, earning an Associate of Science degree in fisheries technology. He earned a bachelor's degree in fisheries science and a master's degree in crop and soil science from Oregon State University in Corvallis, Oregon.

Cassidy is an instructor and research assistant in crop science and soil science at Oregon State University, where he also serves as faculty advisor to the OSU Organic Growers Club.

In 2006, Cassidy and Paul Robb reconvened InSoc with a new lineup and released new material in 2007.
