= Paul Robb =

American musician (born 1963)

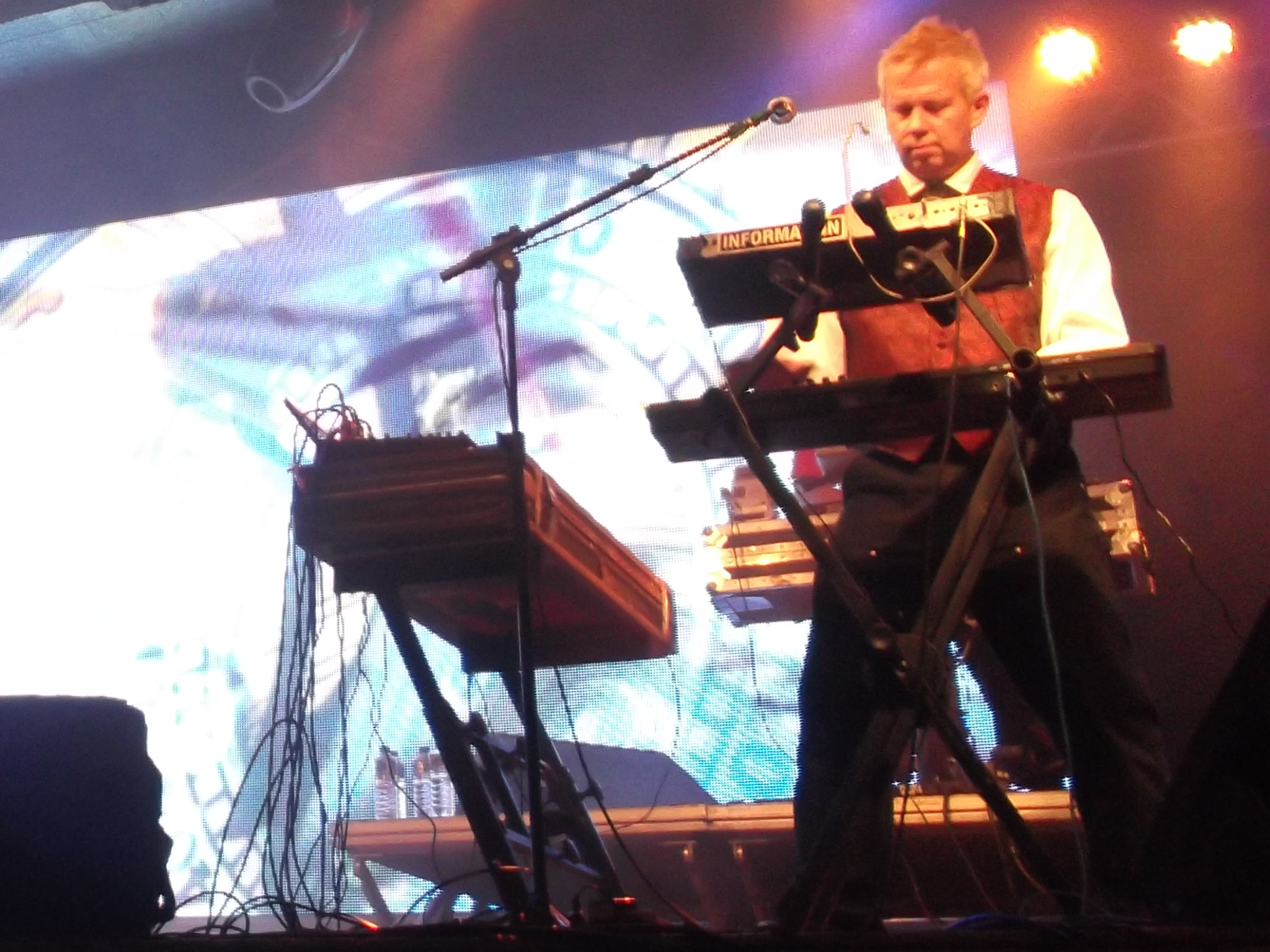
- Paul Robb performing live in 2012
- Born: Paul Jason Robb; February 8, 1963 (age 63); Minneapolis, Minnesota, U.S.
- Occupations: Synthesizer player, producer, songwriter
- Website: http://paulrobb.com/

Paul Jason Robb is an American synthesizer player, producer, songwriter and one of the founding members of the band Information Society.

== Biography ==
Robb was a member of Information Society from its inception in the early 1980s until 1992 (after its third release Peace and Love, Inc.).

When Information Society's contract with Tommy Boy/Reprise/Warner Bros. Records ended, Paul (who at the time had a new infant) chose to work in films and commercials, winning two Clio Awards for BMW ads in the process. In 1996, he started a record company called Hakatak International. Hakatak featured his one-man industrial-tinged band Think Tank, as well as a trip hop- and world music-flavored collaboration with Minneapolis folk singer Barbara Cohen named Brother Sun Sister Moon.

When trip hop briefly gained mainstream popularity following the release of Portishead's Dummy, Brother Sun Sister Moon recorded for Virgin Records, causing the temporary dissolution of Hakatak in June 1997. No album ever resulted from that deal, however, and to this day neither Robb nor Virgin will say what happened.

Robb continued to do TV, film, and commercial work but had no further commercially recorded output until January 2002, when he reappeared with a new record company named Bleep! Records and an album under the name of Luminous, which turned out to be a renamed Brother Sun Sister Moon. The Bleep! Web site promised a new Robb solo album under the name Bitcrusher, but that album was not released before Robb's investors pulled the plug and killed Bleep! in late 2002.

Robb owns a recording studio in Los Angeles called Digitalis (a pun on the heart drug) and continues to produce music for advertisements and television shows. His credits include MTV's The Real World and Road Rules and the score for Trey Parker and Matt Stone's first movie Orgazmo. He later remixed the theme for Parker and Stone's long-running South Park series and was involved in the Chef Aid album as well.

It was announced in 2006 that Robb and James Cassidy would reform Information Society with a new vocalist, Chris Anton. Original vocalist Kurt Harland opted out, citing work and family obligations for a time, but resumed his role as lead singer in 2008. In 2007, the band released an EP, Oscillator, and a new album, Synthesizer, under the resurrected Hakatak label. In 2014 Kurt rejoined the band full time and the album Hello World was released being the first studio album featuring the lineup of Harland, Robb and Cassidy since 1992.

== Hakatak ==
Hakatak
- Founded: 1995
- Founder: Paul Robb
- Genre: Electronic
- Country of origin: U.S.
- Official website: www.hakatak.com

Hakatak International is an American independent record label founded by Robb. It specializes in electronic music acts.

=== Roster ===
- Brother Sun Sister Moon
- Dissonance
- Information Society
- Metrognome:Falcotronik
- Think Tank
