= Rich Man's Wardrobe – A Concise History of The Big Dish =

Studio album by The Big Dish
- Released: 1994
- Length: 60:42
- Label: Virgin

The Big Dish chronology
Satellites (1991)	Rich Man's Wardrobe – A Concise History of The Big Dish (1994)

Rich Man's Wardrobe – A Concise History of The Big Dish is a compilation album by Scottish pop band The Big Dish, which was released by Virgin in 1994.

The compilation gathers fourteen tracks from the band's first two album's, 1986's Swimmer and 1988's Creeping Up on Jesus, along with "Voodoo Baby", which was the B-side of the 1988 single "European Rain". No tracks from the band's 1991 album Satellites are included.

== Background ==
Virgin first made plans to release a Big Dish compilation album in 1991, following the band's Top 40 success with their single "Miss America", released on East West Records. Lindsay was critical of the band's former label's decision and he told the New Musical Express in 1991, "We've heard that Virgin are already putting together a compilation of the first two albums to cash in on the 'Miss America' success – the bastards. They couldn't give a shit when we were actually on the label and now they're doing this."

== Critical reception ==
Professional ratings
Review scores
Source	Rating
The Encyclopedia of Popular Music	3/4 stars

Upon its release, Record Collector considered Rich Man's Wardrobe to be a "respectful collection" and described the Big Dish as "basically a pop vehicle for Steven Lindsay's quaint observations on life". They added, "Although at first glance the Big Dish seemed to be cynically commercial, there was a certain aplomb to Lindsay's talents that lent his songs a similar appeal to those of say, Momus."

== Track listing ==
All tracks are written by Steven Lindsay except where noted

No.	Title	Writer(s)	Length
1.	"Christina's World"		4:09
2.	"Wishing Time"		3:56
3.	"Swimmer"		5:24
4.	"Life"		4:21
5.	"Big New Beginning"		3:22
6.	"Jealous"		3:48
7.	"Faith Healer"		3:59
8.	"Jean"		3:36
9.	"Where Do You Live?"	Lindsay, Paul Wickens	3:41
10.	"Waiting for the Parade"	Lindsay, Brian McFie	4:23
11.	"European Rain"		3:49
12.	"The Loneliest Man in the World"		3:39
13.	"Voodoo Baby"		4:09
14.	"Slide"		5:07
15.	"Prospect Street"		3:23

== Personnel ==
Production

- Ian Ritchie – producer (tracks 1, 3, 12, 14–15)
- Paul Wickens – producer (tracks 2, 9)
- Bruce Lampcov – producer (tracks 4, 7–8, 10–11)
- Paul Hardiman – producer (track 5)
- The Big Dish – producers (tracks 6, 13)

Other

- Walker Evans – church photography (front cover)
- Simon Fowler – front cover photography
- Ronnie Gurr – sleeve notes
