= List of newspapers in Bolivia =

This is a list of newspapers in Bolivia.

== Current newspapers ==
- Ahora el Pueblo — state-funded
- Bolivian Express (La Paz)
- El Chaqueño (Tarija)
- Correo del Sur (Sucre)
- El Deber (Santa Cruz de la Sierra)
- El Día
- El Diario (La Paz) — began publication 5 April 1904; oldest currently in circulation
- La Estrella del Oriente (Santa Cruz de la Sierra)
- Hoy
- Jornada (La Paz) — began publication February 1948
- La Misión
- El Mundo (Santa Cruz de la Sierra)
- El Nacional (Tarija)
- El Nuevo Día (Santa Cruz de la Sierra)
- Nuevo Sur (Tarija)
- Opinión (Cochabamba)
- Página Siete (La Paz) — began publication April 2010
- El País (Tarija)
- La Palabra de Beni
- La Patria (Oruro) — began publication 19 March 1919
- La Prensa (La Paz)
- La Razón (La Paz) — began publication 17 February 1917
- El Sol (Santa Cruz de la Sierra)
- Los Tiempos (Cochabamba) — began publication September 1943
- El Tunari (weekly; Quillacollo) — began publication 26 February 2011

== Defunct newspapers ==
- Última Hora — began publication 30 April 1929; ceased 2001
- Cambio — began publication 22 January 2009; ceased 2019; state-funded
- Bandera Roja — socialist newspaper from 1926 to 1927

== See also ==
- List of newspapers
- Actual list with Bolivian newspapers
