= El Mundo =

El Mundo may refer to:

== Newspapers ==
- El Mundo (Argentina), an Argentine newspaper
- El Mundo (Bolivia), a Bolivian newspaper
- El Mundo (California), a California newspaper based in San Francisco
- El Mundo (Colombia), a Colombian newspaper based in Medellín
- El Mundo (Cuba), a Cuban newspaper which has ceased publication
- El Mundo (El Salvador), a Salvadoran newspaper
- El Mundo (Nevada), a Nevada newspaper
- El Mundo (Puerto Rico), a Puerto Rican newspaper
- El Mundo (Santa Cruz), a Bolivian newspaper
- El Mundo (Spain), a Spanish newspaper
- El Mundo (Texas), a Texas newspaper
- El Mundo (Venezuela), a Venezuelan newspaper

== Other uses ==
- El mundo (novel), a 2007 novel by Juan José Millás
- El Mundo (Diomedes Díaz album), a 1983 album recorded by Diomedes Díaz
- El Mundo (Mitsou album), a 1988 album recorded by Mitsou
- El Mundo (game), a four-player tables game described in the Alfonso X manuscript Libro de los juegos

== See also ==
- Mundo (disambiguation)
