= 25 Years =

25 Years may refer to:

== Albums ==
- 25 Years (Country Gentlemen album), 1980
- 25 Years (EP), a 2009 EP by Middle Class Rut, or the title song
- 25 Years – The Chain, a box set by Fleetwood Mac, 1992
- 25 Years, an album by Donnie Iris, 2004
- 25 Years, a box set by Sting, 2011

== Songs ==
- "25 Years" (The Big Dish song), 1991
- "25 Years" (Hawkwind song), 1978
- "25 Years", a song by Avail from Dixie, 1994
- "25 Years", a song by Blackmore's Night from The Village Lanterne, 2006
- "25 Years", a song by The Catch, 1983
- "25 Years", a song by Pantera from Far Beyond Driven, 1994

== Television ==
- 25 Years (TV programme), a 1985 New Zealand television special
- WWE Raw 25 Years, a 2018 special episode of WWE Raw

== See also ==
- 25 Años (disambiguation)
