= Mundo =

Mundo, meaning "world" in Spanish and Portuguese, may refer to:

== Places ==
- Mundo (river), a river in south-eastern Spain

== People ==
- Mundo (general) (died 536), East Roman general
- Carles Mundó (born 1976), Spanish lawyer and politician from Catalonia
- Edmundo Suárez (1916-1978), Spanish footballer
- Liza del Mundo (born 1975), Filipino-American voice actress
- Joan Maria Mundó i Freixas (1877–1932), Spanish explorer and diamond trader
- Johnny Mundo, ring name of American professional wrestler John Morrison
- Miguel Pedro Mundo (1937–1999), American Catholic bishop in Brazil
- Osmundo Rama (1914—1998), Filipino politician
- Raffaele Armando Califano Mundo (1857–1930), Italian painter

== Other uses ==
- Mundo (Rubén Blades album), 2003
- Mundo (Mariza album), 2015
- "Mundo", a 2018 song by IV of Spades

== See also ==
- El Mundo (disambiguation)
- Mondo (disambiguation)
- Mundus (disambiguation)
