= Prospect Street (song) =

1985 song by The Big Dish

"Prospect Street" is a song by Scottish pop band The Big Dish. Written by lead singer Steven Lindsay, the song was originally recorded with producer Paul Hardiman and released as a non-album single in 1985. A re-recorded version with Ian Ritchie as producer was included on the band's debut studio album Swimmer and was released as the album's second single in 1986.

The song was inspired by the Edward Hopper's 1934 painting Sun on Prospect Street.

== 1985 version ==
"Prospect Street"

Single by The Big Dish
- B-side: "Something from Nothing"
- Released: October 1985
- Length: 3:25
- Label: Virgin
- Songwriter: Steven Lindsay
- Producer: Paul Hardiman

The Big Dish singles chronology
"Big New Beginning" (1985)	"Prospect Street" (1985)	"Slide" (1986)

=== Critical reception ===
Upon its release, Jerry Smith of Music Week described the Big Dish as "promising" and noted that they "carry on the Scottish tradition of bright, funky pop with this memorable tune". He added that the song "show[s] a keen sense of dramatics within its effective Paul Hardiman production". Music & Media felt it continued the "acoustic base" of the "Lloyd Cole influenced" band's debut single "Big New Beginning" and added that the lead vocals are "strong and committed". Stephen Padgett of Cash Box noted the song's "rich melodicism", "rolling acoustic guitars" and "a searching romanticism". They added it was "recommended, especially for your Aztec Camera, Del Amitri, et al fans". Mike Gardner of Record Mirror was critical, describing it as "blandness in all its jangly guitar glory".

=== Track listing ===
7-inch single (UK)

1. "Prospect Street" – 3:25
2. "Something from Nothing" – 2:42

7-inch single double-pack with free "Big New Beginning" single (UK)

1. "Prospect Street" – 3:25
2. "Something from Nothing" – 2:42
3. "Big New Beginning" – 3:24
4. "Jealous" – 3:48

12-inch single (UK)

1. "Prospect Street" – 3:25
2. "Something from Nothing" – 2:42
3. "Tours" – 3:26

=== Personnel ===
Production

- Paul Hardiman – producer ("Prospect Street", "Big New Beginning")
- Steven Lindsay – producer ("Something from Nothing", "Tours")
- Gordon Rintoul – engineer ("Something from Nothing", "Tours")
- The Big Dish – producers ("Jealous")
- Allan McNeil – engineer ("Jealous")

Other

- Walker Evans estate – front cover photograph
- Red Ranch – sleeve design

=== Charts ===
Chart (1985)	Peak position
UK Singles Chart	166

== 1986 version ==
"Prospect Street"

Single by The Big Dish

from the album Swimmer
- B-side: "From the Neighbourhood"
- Released: October 1986
- Length: 3:24
- Label: Virgin
- Songwriter: Steven Lindsay
- Producer: Ian Ritchie

The Big Dish singles chronology
"Slide" (1986)	"Prospect Street" (1986)	"Christina's World" (1987)

=== Critical reception ===
Upon its release as a single, Anna Martin of Number One praised "Prospect Street" as a "worthy release" which "verges on almost perfect pop – powerful, opulent and polished". She added, "Executed in their usual wonderfully melodic style, the Big Dish have once again juggled with the right ingredients – catchy tune, tantalising riffs and highly competent playing – and created yet another tasty sampler." John Lee of the Huddersfield Daily Examiner described it as "a boppy little number which has definite chart potential" and added that it is "clean, crisp and ideally suited to extensive radio play".

Paul Benbow of the Reading Evening Post noted it is "the sort of sound that made hit and after hit for Lloyd Cole". William Leith of NME noted the "obvious guitar-rip" from Bruce Springsteen's "Born to Run" and added, "It's a bold move on the part of the group. And it's not a bad bit of rock, with a hint of Rod Stewart at the beginning and the odd dropped vocal in the style of Lloyd Cole. Polished." Edwin Pouncey of Sounds called out the "steal" from "Born to Run" and added that the "blatant rip-off was the only thing to capture my attention as it spun to its doom". Roger Morton of Record Mirror commented, "Accomplished white boys making clean soul pop, for the love of mimicry. The Big Dish re-release their very decent 'un-recognised gem' with its Northern soul-ish chorus." In a 1992 'guide to streets in rock', NME included "Prospect Street" and wrote, "Shite Scots band maintain the tiresome Caledonian tradition of naming songs after streets."

=== Track listing ===
7-inch single (UK and New Zealand)

1. "Prospect Street" – 3:24
2. "From the Neighbourhood" – 3:44

12-inch single (UK)

1. "Prospect Street" – 3:24
2. "From the Neighbourhood" – 3:44
3. "Back Door Bound" – 4:05

=== Personnel ===
The Big Dish

- Steven Lindsay – vocals, guitar, keyboards
- Brian McFie – lead guitar, second guitar
- Raymond Docherty – bass

Production

- Ian Ritchie – producer ("Prospect Street", "Back Door Bound")
- Chris Sheldon – engineer ("Prospect Street", "Back Door Bound")
- Glyn Johns – producer ("From the Neighbourhood")

Other

- Gary Wathen – art direction
- Red Ranch and Gowans – design
- Heather Angel – fish photography
- Bleddyn Butcher – band photography
