= The Big Town =

The Big Town may refer to:

- The Big Town (1925 film), an American short silent comedy film
- The Big Town (1987 film), an American drama film
- Big Town (1932 film), an American crime film
- Big Town (1947 film), an American crime film
- Big Town, a radio drama series, later adapted to film and television and a comic book
- "Big Town" (song), a 1990 song by The Big Dish
- "Big Town", a song by OMD from the album Sugar Tax
- Big Town (TV series), 1955 American TV series
- Big Town (American TV series), 1950-1956 American TV series
