= Exit Music (album) =

Studio album by Steven Lindsay
- Released: 8 November 2004
- Length: 36:12
- Label: Seminal
- Producer: Steven Lindsay

Steven Lindsay chronology
Exit Music (2004)	Kite (2007)

Exit Music is the debut solo studio album from Scottish singer-songwriter Steven Lindsay, released by Seminal Records on 8 November 2004. The label reissued the album in 2005 with two bonus tracks.

Following the split of his band, the Big Dish, in 1991, Lindsay focused on a new career as an illustrator and art director. Although he continued to be involved in some music projects during this time, Exit Music was Lindsay's first album since the Big Dish's Satellites in 1991. With the breakup of his marriage, he was inspired to record an album "totally on my own terms". Exit Music received positive reviews from critics.

== Background ==
The recording and release of Exit Music marked Lindsay's full-time return to the music industry. After the Big Dish split in 1991, Lindsay felt disillusioned with the music industry and moved into the design industry, where he worked as an illustrator and art director. He remained involved with music by sporadically recording soundtrack music for TV, collaborating with other artists as a songwriter or producer, and managing a band for a time.

Speaking of his days in the Big Dish and his decision to record a solo album over a decade later, Lindsay told the Sunday Mail in 2004, "There was always pressure in the business to have hit singles. They didn't let you develop as a writer or artist, so I turned my back on it. But I woke up one morning and thought, 'I can make a great record again.' The songs on Exit Music have been recorded totally on my own terms."

Lindsay attributed the writing and recording of Exit Music, and his decision to return to the music industry, to the breakup of his marriage. In a 2007 interview with Londonist, he described Exit Music as "more a breakup record" and "more instinctive" when compared to his 2007 follow-up album Kite.

Rather than write new material using a guitar as he had previously done with the Big Dish, Lindsay chose to write the songs for Exit Music on the piano, an instrument he felt less confident with. He told Penny Black Music in 2007, "I thought that I would start writing songs on the piano for Exit Music and it all fell together from that. The sound was quite fluid and I liked that. I then added guitar and drum machine parts later."

== Critical reception ==
Professional ratings
Review scores
Source	Rating
The Guardian	4/5 stars
The Independent	3.5/5 stars

On its release, Henrietta Roussoulis of The Independent summarised Exit Music as "a gloss-free, coffee-table pop record" and "music to mooch around the house to". She described Lindsay's voice as "border[ing] on Rufus Wainwright territory" and the album's lyrics as being "firmly in the David Gray league". Craig McLean of The Daily Telegraph noted the "elegant beauty" of the album, describing it as one which "already feels like a quiet, timeless masterpiece". He added, "The piano, drum machines and home-cooked synthscapes work in well-oiled tandem with the string arrangements of Craig Armstrong. This deft, bespoke musicianship is pressed into the service of some fantastic songs."

Adam Sweeting of The Guardian considered Exit Music to be "a showcase for Lindsay's powerful melodies and clean, agile vocals". He added, "After a couple of spins the music starts to seep into your pores and play tricks with your emotions. It's the kind of disc that's liable to start its own cult." Entertainment.ie praised it as a "minor masterpiece" and noted the "instrumentation is sparse and unobtrusive, mainly made up of haunting piano and subtle string arrangements". The reviewer felt Lindsay's vocals were reminiscent of Bono and added that "there are plenty of songs here that would grace any U2 album". Scotland on Sunday picked Exit Music as their "Album of the Year".

== Track listing ==
All tracks are written by Steven Lindsay.

No.	Title	Length
1.	"The 14th"	1:53
2.	"Breakdown"	3:47
3.	"Butterfly"	4:12
4.	"Goodnight"	2:35
5.	"November"	3:24
6.	"Birdsong"	3:18
7.	"Midnight"	3:48
8.	"Shoot the Breeze"	3:35
9.	"Low"	3:09
10.	"Submarine"	4:03
11.	"Valentine"	2:54

2005 CD re-issue bonus tracks
No.	Title	Writer(s)	Length
12.	"Spread It Around"		3:21
13.	"The First Time Ever I Saw Your Face"	Ewan MacColl	3:58

== Personnel ==
- Steve Lindsay – vocals and instruments (all tracks), string arrangements (tracks 7, 11)
- Craig Armstrong – string arrangements (tracks 3, 5)
- Cecilia Weston – string arrangements (tracks 7, 11)
- The Scottish Ensemble – string section
- Scott Frazer – bass (tracks 2, 7)

Production

- Steve Lindsay – producer
- Brian McNeil, Robin Rankine – engineers

Other

- Graham Wylie – photography
