= Carlos Subirana Gianella =

Bolivian politician (born 1986)

Carlos Subirana
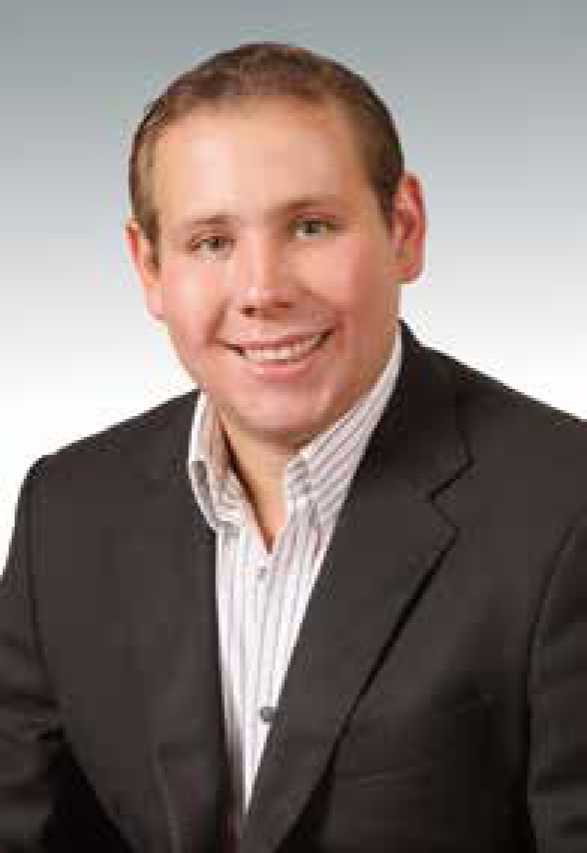
- Official portrait, 2014

Member of the Chamber of Deputies from Santa Cruz circumscription 50
- In office 19 January 2010 – 18 January 2015
- Substitute: Verónica Aguilera
- Preceded by: Katia Romero
- Succeeded by: Griselda Muñoz (Note: Redistribution; circumscription 51.)
- Constituency: Santa Cruz de la Sierra

Personal details
- Born: Carlos Eduardo Subirana Gianella; 18 August 1986 (age 40) Santa Cruz de la Sierra, Bolivia
- Party: Revolutionary Nationalist Movement (2005–2014)
- Parents: Carlos Subirana Suárez; Ana María Gianella Peredo
- Relatives: Wálter Subirana (uncle)
- Education: Private University of Santa Cruz de la Sierra
- Occupation: Lawyer; politician
- Website: Official blog

Carlos Eduardo Subirana Gianella (born 18 August 1986) is a Bolivian lawyer and politician who served as a member of the Chamber of Deputies from Santa Cruz, representing circumscription 50 from 2010 to 2015.

Subirana was born into the wealthy Subirana family of Santa Cruz de la Sierra. He is a son of Carlos Subirana Suárez, a prominent businessman and politician. He graduated as a lawyer from the Private University of Santa Cruz de la Sierra. While still in law school in 2009, Subirana was elected to the Chamber of Deputies, representing an urban constituency in his home department.

At age 23, Subirana was one of the youngest persons ever elected to parliament – a development brought about by the reduction of constitutional age limits in place until the 2009 election. Although elected as a member of the opposition, Subirana defected to the governing party in 2014, following the course of his father and other Santa Cruz elites.

After leaving office, Subirana joined his family's law firm, Subirana & Associates, where he previously worked as a paralegal. He served as general manager of the family-owned newspaper La Estrella del Oriente from 2015 to 2017 and sits on the publication's editorial board.

== Early life and career ==
=== Early life and education ===
Carlos Subirana was born on 18 August 1986 in Santa Cruz de la Sierra to businessman Carlos Subirana Suárez and Ana María Gianella Peredo. The Subirana family are a wealthy, well-established clan in Santa Cruz. His father worked as an executive in the financial services sector and served as minister of justice in the administration of Hugo Banzer; his uncle, Wálter, was minister of labor in the second cabinet of Gonzalo Sánchez de Lozada.

Raised Catholic, Subirana received an education befitting his family's social status. He received his secondary baccalaureate from the prestigious bilingual Eagles' School at age 18, and studied law at the Private University of Santa Cruz de la Sierra – an elite institute that catered in large part to the city's economic and political upper crust.

=== Legal and media career ===
Outside of office, Subirana spent the bulk of his career employed at a number of family-related businesses and media outlets. He began as a paralegal at his family's firm, Subirana & Associates, where he later practiced law after his term in parliament. From 2015 to 2017, Subirana served as general manager of the family-owned newspaper La Estrella del Oriente; (Note: Subirana is listed as "general manager" on La Estrella del Oriente's impressum from its 7,892nd edition published 29 May 2015 until its 8,700th published 6 September 2017; a relative, Sonia Satt Subirana, succeeded him on that date.) he currently holds a seat on the publication's editorial board. He is a co-host with his father on the pro bono legal advice radio program Subirana Responde.

== Chamber of Deputies ==
=== Election ===
Before running for office, Subirana led a non-partisan youth political advocacy group based in Santa Cruz de la Sierra. Following the breakup of the organization, he took the unusual step of joining the Revolutionary Nationalist Movement (MNR), a front in such steep political decline that Subirana himself would later describe it as a "dead party". He led a cohort of youth activists that sought to reorient the MNR back to its ideological roots, away from the centrist neoliberalism promoted by past leadership. Subirana served on the board of the MNR's department branch office in Santa Cruz; as a member of the party's youth wing, he composed part of the MNR campaign team for the 2006 Constituent Assembly election.

The MNR did not contest the 2009 election. Its presidential candidate, Germán Antelo, dropped out to back National Convergence (CN), the big tent alliance of Manfred Reyes Villa. For his support, CN granted Antelo broad discretion over its slate of candidates in Santa Cruz. Subirana, who was still in law school, was among the few MNR members Antelo selected. He ran in and won single-member circumscription 50, an urban district encompassing western portions of Santa Cruz de la Sierra. After his father and great-grandfather, he was the third in the Subirana family to hold a seat in parliament.

=== Tenure ===
Subirana was sworn in on 19 January 2010; at 23, he was the youngest voting (Note: Three members elected as substitutes were younger than Subirana. When factoring in these, Rodolfo Avilés – born 6 March 1988 – becomes the youngest individual elected to office in 2009.) member of the chamber and is one of the youngest persons ever elected to parliament. He joined the first freshman class to be elected under the 2009 Constitution, which lowered the minimum age for holding office from 25 to 18 years.

What's right is right and what's wrong [is wrong. There are times] in which I'm more radical than the ruling party ... on other occasions, I'm more opposed than any opposition [lawmaker].

— Carlos Subirana, 2013

A self-styled "proactive opponent", Subirana was more amicable toward the ruling Movement for Socialism (MAS) compared to other opposition lawmakers. On occasion, this position earned him flack from more adversarial members of his caucus.

In legislation, Subirana hitched his platform to public safety reform, which he pursued while in office. He penned modifications to articles 133 of the criminal procedure code and 177 of the penal code, which – with some amendments and under a different name – were enacted into law. In 2013, he authored a bill that declared 23 September as the National Day Against Human Trafficking, which also passed into law.

In an about-face, Subirana flipped his support to the MAS in the 2014 election. The reversal followed the nomination of his father to contest a seat in parliament for the ruling party. Despite their previous opposition to the government, the flip was not unprecedented, as both Subiranas had long been open about their left-wing views. (Note: According to Salvador Romero, the Subiranas reflected a change in attitude among some Santa Cruz elites, who considered that Evo Morales's prolonged stay in power indicated a need to set aside previous animosity for the sake of regional business interests.) With his father running, Subirana was sidelined, meaning he was not nominated for a second term.

=== Commission assignments ===
- Chamber of Deputies Directorate (Third Secretary: 2013–2014)
- Constitution, Legislation, and Electoral System Commission
  - Constitutional Development and Legislation Committee (2010–2011)
  - Democracy and Electoral System Committee (Secretary: 2011–2012)
- Education and Health Commission (President: 2012–2013)
- Government, Defense, and Armed Forces Commission
  - Fight Against Drug Trafficking Committee (2014–2015)

== Electoral history ==
Electoral history of Carlos Subirana
Year	Office	Party	Alliance	Votes			Result	Ref.
Year	Office	Party	Alliance	Total	%	P.	Result	Ref.
2009	Deputy	Revolutionary Nationalist Movement	National Convergence	43,654	52.48%	1st	Won	
Source: Plurinational Electoral Organ | Electoral Atlas

Chamber of Deputies of Bolivia
Preceded by Katia Romero	Member of the Chamber of Deputies from Santa Cruz circumscription 50; 2010–2015	Succeeded by Griselda Muñoz
Preceded by Erika Claure	Third Secretary of the Chamber of Deputies; 2013–2014	Succeeded by Farides Vaca
Honorary titles
Preceded by Oscar Chirinos	Baby of the Chamber; 2010–2014	Succeeded by Juan Pablo Flores
Media offices
Preceded by Ana María Gianella	General Manager of La Estrella del Oriente; 2015–2017	Succeeded by Sonia Satt
