= Heather Angel =

Heather Angel may refer to:

- Heather Angel (actress) (1909–1986), English actress
- Heather Angel (photographer) (born 1941), British nature photographer, author and television presenter
