= Slide (The Big Dish song) =

Single by The Big Dish

from the album Swimmer
- B-side: "Reverend Killer"
- Released: 18 August 1986
- Length: 5:06 (album version); 3:58 (single version); 5:58 (extended version)
- Label: Virgin
- Songwriter: Steven Lindsay
- Producer: Ian Ritchie

The Big Dish singles chronology
"Prospect Street" (1985)	"Slide" (1986)	"Prospect Street" (1986)

"Slide" is a song by Scottish pop band The Big Dish, which was released on 18 August 1986 as the second single from their debut studio album, Swimmer (1986). The song was written by Steven Lindsay and produced by Ian Ritchie.

With its original 1986 release, "Slide" failed to reach the top 100 of the UK Singles Chart, stalling at number 147. A reissue saw the single peak at number 86 in the UK Singles Chart in May 1987.

== Music video ==
The song's music video was directed by Larry Williams and produced by Leslie Libman and Francine Moore. It achieved light rotation on MTV.

== Critical reception ==
Upon its release as a single, Richard Cook of Sounds picked "Slide" as the magazine's "single of the week". He praised it as a "subtle, unemphatic pearl" that is "finely tailored to a regimental Britpop production" and "very knowing in its use of a great pop hook". He added, "It seems like nothing at first, but Stephen Lindsay's insight into love song hackery and the way it's lifted by shining pop melody is second to none." Paul Henderson of Kerrang! wrote, "Definitely a very classy sound. Simple song, simple bass line but a great feel. Reminds me a bit of Tom Robinson's 'War Baby'. Single of the week – definitely." John Waite, as a guest reviewer in the same issue of the magazine, was also positive, stating, "Oh yes! Good groove. It's a hit. Good singer, great choice of notes, he 'bends around' the song. Great stuff."

Paul Benbow of the Reading Evening Post considered it to be "big production pop just right for Radio 1". Paul Massey of the Aberdeen Evening Express stated, "One of the UK's most underrated bands come up with another song that reaches out and demands attention: rather mournful but deserving of success." Jerry Smith of Music Week called it "another well written number, but although polished and worthy of attention, does lack the pop dynamics of their two previous, brilliant, singles". He described the Big Dish as "promising" and "certainly a band to watch for in the future".

As the band's US debut single, Billboard wrote, "Highly touted Scottish band offers a graceful reworking of the "Everybody Wants to Rule the World" groove, with attractive baritone vocal, tidy arrangement, and soaring chorus." Cash Box considered "Slide" to be an "emotionally rendered pop song with jazzy overtones" and a "promising debut". In a review of Swimmer, Brant Houston of the Hartford Courant described "Slide" as a track that "provides [a] big, open sound for a summer's day of lounging on the lawn".

== Track listing ==
7" single

1. "Slide" – 3:58
2. "Reverend Killer" – 3:59

7" single (US promo)

1. "Slide" (Edit) – 3:58
2. "Slide" (Edit) – 3:58

12" single

1. "Slide" (Extended Version) – 5:58
2. "Reverend Killer" – 3:59
3. "Presence" – 3:38

12" single (US promo)

1. "Slide" (LP Version) – 5:06
2. "Slide" (Edit) – 3:58

== Personnel ==
The Big Dish

- Steven Lindsay – vocals, guitar, keyboards
- Brian McFie – lead guitar, second guitar
- Raymond Docherty – bass

Production

- Ian Ritchie – producer and programming on "Slide"
- Chris Sheldon – engineer on "Slide" and "Reverend Killer"
- Paul Hardiman – producer on "Reverend Killer"
- Glyn Johns – producer on "Presence"

Other

- Gary Wathen – art direction
- Red Ranch – design
- Heather Angel – photography

== Charts ==
Chart (1987)	Peak position
UK Singles (OCC)	86
