= Nina Py Brozovich =

Bolivian activist

Nina Py Brozovich is a Bolivian climate activist. She founded Fridays For Future in Bolivia. She was a part of the United Nations Youth Climate Summit.

Her work has appeared in Bolivian Express, Pagina Siete (Spanish: Página Siete), and Fridays for Future weekly. She was a part of the UNICEF "One Generation" campaign. She is a volunteer at La Senda Verde.
