= Colegio Urdaneta Ikastetxea =

Colegio Padres Agustinos de Urdaneta

Location
- C/ Lauroeta Etorbidea, 6 48180 Loiu (Biscay); Loiu, Biscay; Spain

Information
- Type: Semi-private
- Founded: 1970
- Director: Daniel Bengoechea
- Enrollment: 2200
- Campus: Suburban
- Colours: Sky blue and marine blue.
- Affiliation: Provincia Agustiniana del Santísimo Nombre de Jesús de Filipinas
- Website: http://www.colegiourdaneta.com/

Colegio Urdaneta Ikastetxea is an Augustinian semi-private mixed elementary, middle and high school owned by Congregation for Religious “Provincia Agustiniana del Santísimo Nombre de Jesús de Filipinas”. Its facilities are located in Loiu, Neguri and Moyua, in the province of Biscay, Spain.

This school was ranked in 26th position among the first best one hundred schools in Spain by El Mundo Newspaper in 2017.

== See also ==
- Augustine of Hippo
