= Bandera Roja (La Paz) =

Bolivian weekly newspaper

- Type: Weekly newspaper
- Founder: Felipe Reque Lozano
- Founded: June 8, 1926
- Ceased publication: 1927
- Political alignment: Socialist
- Language: Spanish language
- Headquarters: La Paz

Bandera Roja ('Red Flag') was a weekly labour newspaper published from La Paz, Bolivia, between 1926 and 1927. In total 52 issues of the newspapers were published, a record for Bolivian labour publications of the era.

== Early period ==
Felipe Reque Lozano was the director and administrator of the newspaper. Reque Lozano also owned the printing press used for printing Bandera Roja.

The first issue of Bandera Roja appeared on June 8, 1926. It was linked to different trade unions. Along with Reque Lozano the newspaper was run by a group of intellectuals during its early phase. The people behind Bandera Roja included Óscar Cerruto, Rafael A. Reyeros, Carlos Mendoza Mamani (a tailor, leader of the Federación Obrera del Trabajo union) and Julio M. Ordoñez.

== Editorial line ==
Seeking to reach the working class, the writers of the newspaper adopted vulgar and simplified discourses. It often used attention-grabbing graphics.

Bandera Roja promoted the 8-hour working day and university autonomy. The publication was vehemently anti-clerical. It also promoted rights for the indigenous population.

Whilst some of the material in Bandera Roja had an anarchist tint, Bandera Roja was the first Bolivian publication that identified itself with the Communist International. Some of the articles from Bandera Roja were reproduced in the Latin American organ of the Communist International, La Correspondencia Sudamericana. Whilst not an organ for any party, the newspaper wrote about electoral campaigns of 'comrades' running for local offices.

== Uncia miners' massacre ==
In July 1926 Bandera Roja denounced a massacre of mine workers in Uncia. In response the government launched a crack-down against Bandera Roja. Its office was stormed. Two editors (Ordoñez and Reyeros) were arrested, whilst Reque Lozano, Mendoza Mamani and Cerruto went underground. The crack-down on Bandera Roja was criticized sharply in the mainstream press.

== FOT organ ==
Towards the end of 1926 Bandera Roja shifted course. Reque sought to make the newspaper an organ of the trade union movement and a committee, which included FOT and other unions, was formed to support Bandera Roja. This move led to a break with the intellectuals. A new editorial team was formed after the split, which included Guillermo Gamarra (president of the Uncia Workers Federation). The newspaper became an organ of FOT.

== Closure ==
In 1927 Bandera Roja dismissed government claims of a communist plot to seize power (which supposedly would have involved unions and the Labour Party). The newspaper was closed down by the government soon afterwards.
