= Malgrat de Mar =

Malgrat
- Municipality
- Malgrat de Mar
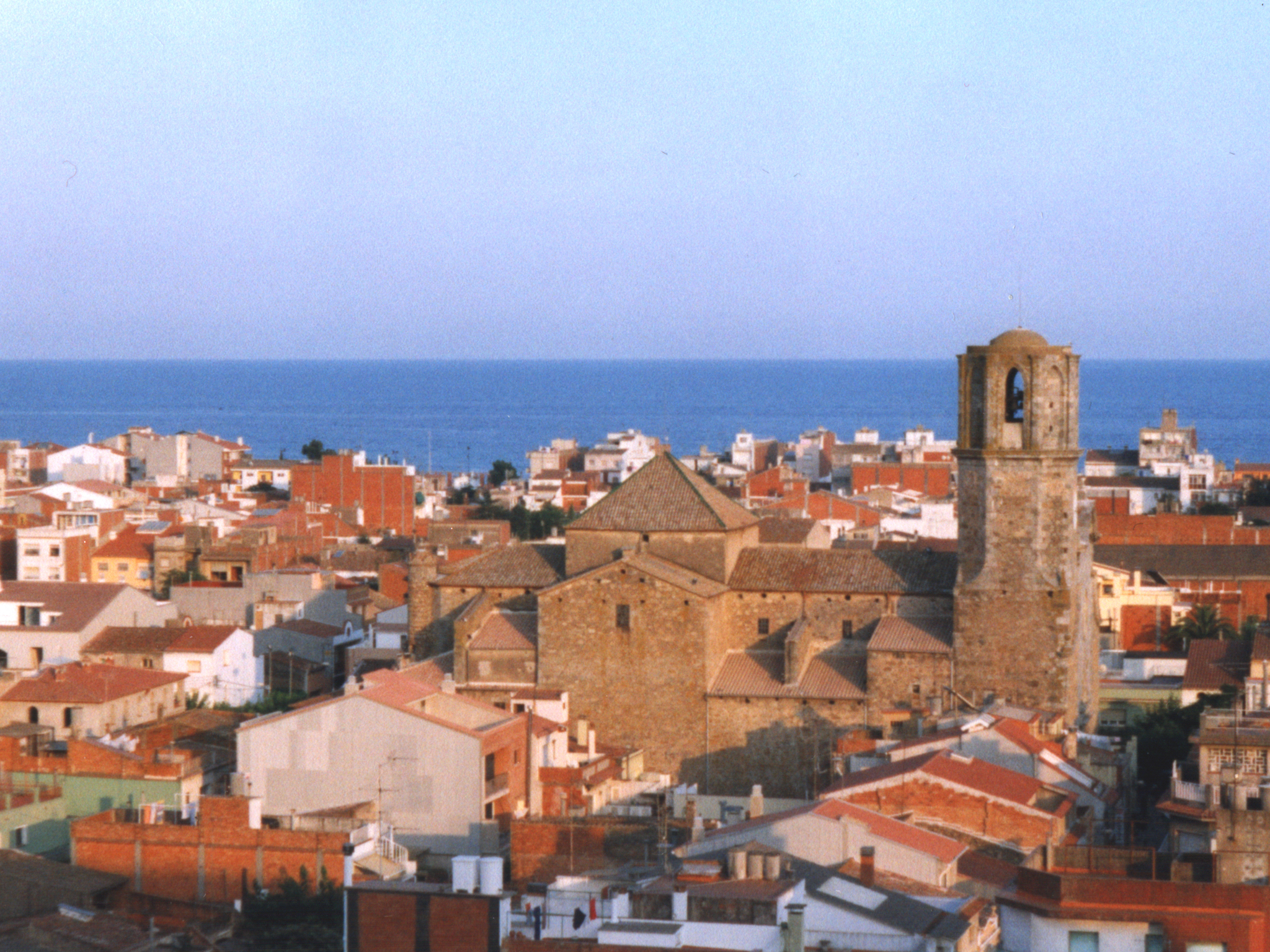
- Malgrat de Mar in 1999

- Coat of arms
- Motto: Malgrat t'estima*
- Location in Catalonia Malgrat (Spain)
- Coordinates: 41°39′N 2°45′E
- Country: Spain
- Community: Catalonia
- Province: Barcelona
- Comarca: Maresme
- Established: 1373

Government
  - Mayor: Sònia Viñolas (PSC Malgrat)

Area
  - Total: 8.8 km^{2} (3.4 sq mi)
- Elevation: 4 m (13 ft)

Population (2025-01-01)
  - Total: 19,714
  - Density: 2,200/km^{2} (5,800/sq mi)
- Demonym: Malgratenc
- Postal code: 08380
- Area code: +34 93
- Website: www.ajmalgrat.cat

Malgrat de Mar (Catalan pronunciation: [məlˈɣɾad də ˈmaɾ]) is a municipality in the comarca of the Maresme, in the province of Barcelona, Catalonia, Spain. It is located on the Barcelona Coast between Santa Susanna and Blanes. A local road runs from the town to the main N-II road, while the B-682 connects it with Blanes, Lloret de Mar and Tossa de Mar. It is served by a Renfe railway station on the R1 line between Barcelona and Maçanet-Massanes.

== History ==
Malgrat de Mar was originally part of the barony of Palafolls and the first fishermen's houses were built around the chapel of Sant Antoni Abat, on the left bank of a stream called Malgrat de Mar. During the 16th century, it was attacked by the Ottomans in 1543, 1545 and 1550. In 1373, a charter of the founding population called Vilanova de Palafolls was granted and in 1559, it achieved the parish independence from Sant Genís de Palafolls (now a neighbourhood of Palafolls).

Since the 14th century, Malgrat de Mar has been recognized as a prominent cultural, artistic and social center. Modernism in Malgrat de Mar also left its mark.

The name Malgrat appears in the 19th century, although the place name is already documented in the 13th century. The etymology is discussed as either pre-Roman or it could be related to bad degree in the sense of disembarkation (mal grau). Some speculate that the name originates from French soldiers taken prisoner in Hostalric during the Crusade against the Crown of Aragon, who were taken to work "reluctantly" (mal great, in Catalan) According to Bernat Boades, in the Libre dels Feyts d'armes de Catalunya, "He made them go to work in a big tower near the sea. As they went there reluctantly, they went from Palafolls to work in that land they called Malgrat (reluctantly)"

On May 30, 1937, in the middle of the Spanish Civil War, the transport ship Ciudad de Barcelona, carrying volunteer brigadiers, was torpedoed by Italian-flagged submarines and sank in front of Malgrat de Mar about 2 miles from the beach. The fishermen who witnessed the action then went out to sea to rescue the survivors and every year the descendants of the fishermen who made the rescue commemorate it.

During the Storm Gloria, Malgrat was significantly affected and was categorized as one of the worst locations that the storm had hit. This is partly due to the fact that Malgrat is bordering the Tordera river, with the main source of water to the town being temporarily stopped due to such high levels of water.

== Climate ==
The town is located 4 meters above sea level. It has a coastal Mediterranean climate, with stable, mild temperatures almost over the whole year. The annual precipitation amount averaged over the last 18 years is about 600 mm.

== Demographics ==
The town has significantly increased in the last 40 years, with a gradual increase in population from 5500 inhabitants in 1958 to 17531 inhabitants in 2006. After the year 2008 the population stabilized at around 18000 inhabitants, which continues to this day.

In 1998 and 1999 the female population was slightly dominant, while from 2002 the male population began to predominate, with a growing difference of more than 200 people in 2006 (8,869 men to 8,662 women), with an average of 102 men for 100 women. The main reasons for this difference are the rapid growth of the population, especially with the young population having children, and the higher male birth rate.

== Economy ==
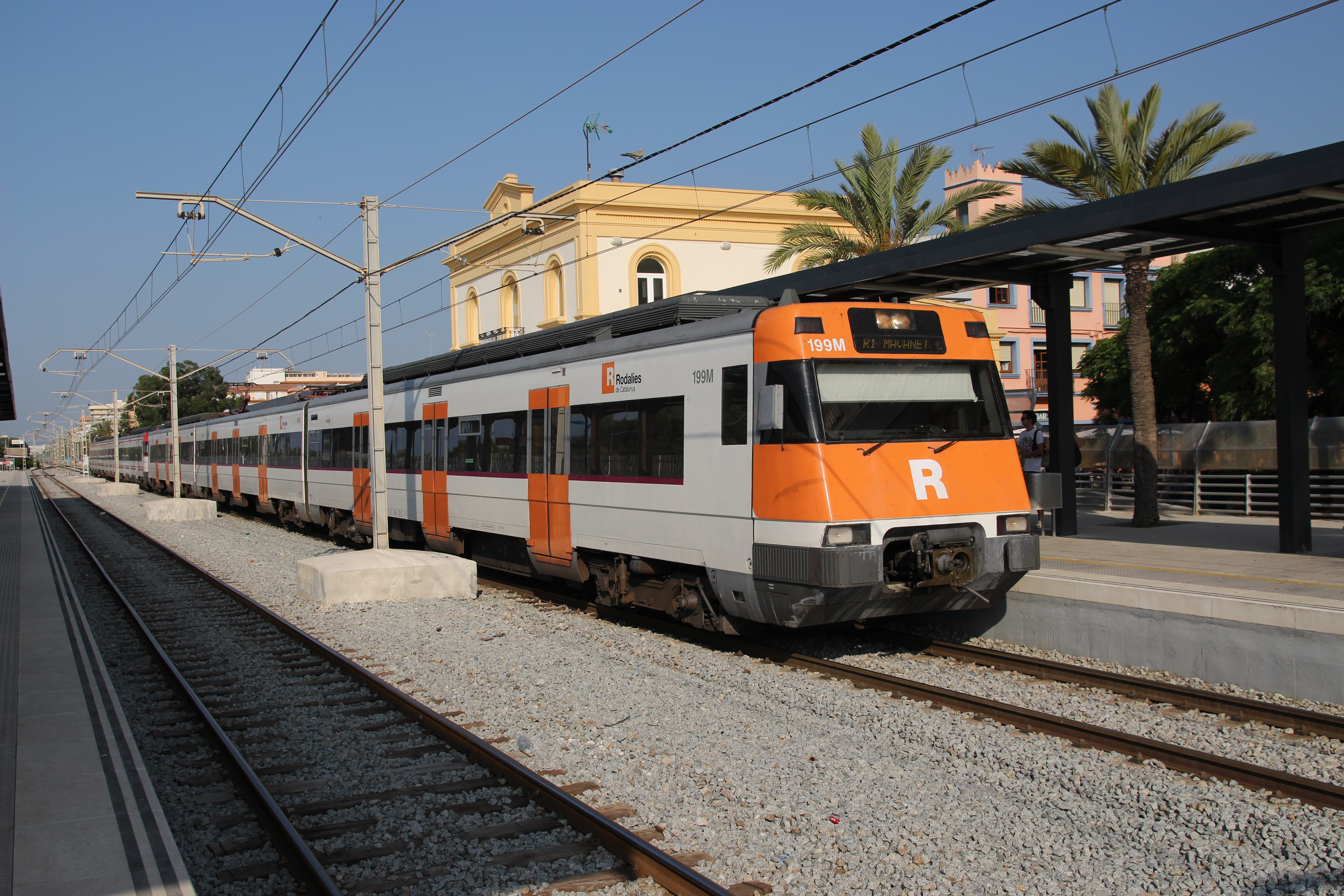
Malgrat de Mar train station (R1).

The main economic engine of the town and the area surrounding the town is tourism. Malgrat has hotels, campsites and shops to meet the demands of visitors, mainly centred around the street Passeig Marítim. Other notable economic drivers are the agricultural areas of the Pla de Grau and the Pla de Pineda, and industry, with the Can Patalina estate and the Camí de la Pomareda factories, although in recent years they have been losing strength.

Since the end of the Spanish Civil War, maritime activity has mainly been concentrated on sports, leisure boats and local fishing boats, with a fishing club. In the 18th century there were about 200 men with naval registration with a total of up to 50 ships of one to four tons doing traffic along the coast to Valencia and France.

== Politics ==
Municipal politics in Malgrat de Mar has been dominated by the Socialists' Party of Catalonia since the transition to democracy in Spain, with their time in power only being interrupted between 2017 and 2019.

Last Regional Election (2024)
Party	Number of Votes	Percentage of Votes (%)
Partit Socialista de Catalunya	2209	29,69%
Junts per Catalunya	1583	21,27%
Esquerra Republicana de Catalunya	1218	16,37%
Partit Popular de Catalunya	751	10,09%
VOX	579	7,78%
Comuns Sumar	297	3,99%
Candidatura d'Unitat Popular	255	3,42%
Aliança Catalana	235	3,15%
PACMA	104	1,39%
Ciutadans	51	0,68%
Alhora	31	0,41%
Front Obrer	24	0,32%
Retallades Zero	5	0,06%
Per Un Món Més Just	4	0,05%
Esquerra Per Espanya	3	0,04%
Partit Comunista dels Treballadors de Catalunya	1	0,01%

Last Municipal Election (2023)
Party	Number of Votes	Councillors
Partit Socialista de Catalunya	2018	5
Junts per Malgrat	1463	4
Esquerra Republicana de Catalunya	1118	3
Malgrat ens Mou	1084	3
Partit Popular de Catalunya	672	1
Candidatura d'Unitat Popular	585	1

Term	Name of the mayor	Political Party
1979-1983	Josep Mora i Girons	PSC-PSOE
1983-1987	Josep Mora i Girons	PSC-PSOE
1987-1991	Josep Mora i Girons	PSC-PSOE
1991-1995	Conxita Campoy i Martí	PSC-PSOE
1995-1999	Conxita Campoy i Martí	PSC-PSOE
1999-2003	Conxita Campoy i Martí	PSC-PSOE
2003-2007	Conxita Campoy i Martí	PSC-PSOE
2007-2011	Conxita Campoy i Martí	PSC-PSOE
2011-2015	Conxita Campoy i Martí	PSC-PSOE
2015-2019	Joan Mercader i Carbó (2015-2017), Carme Ponsa i Monge (2017-2019)	PSC-PSOE (2015–17), Junts per Malgrat (2017–19)
2019-2021	Joan Mercader i Carbó	PSC-PSOE
2021-2023	Sònia Viñolas Mollfulleda	PSC-PSOE
2023 (incumbent)	Sònia Viñolas Mollfulleda	PSC-PSOE

== Main sights ==
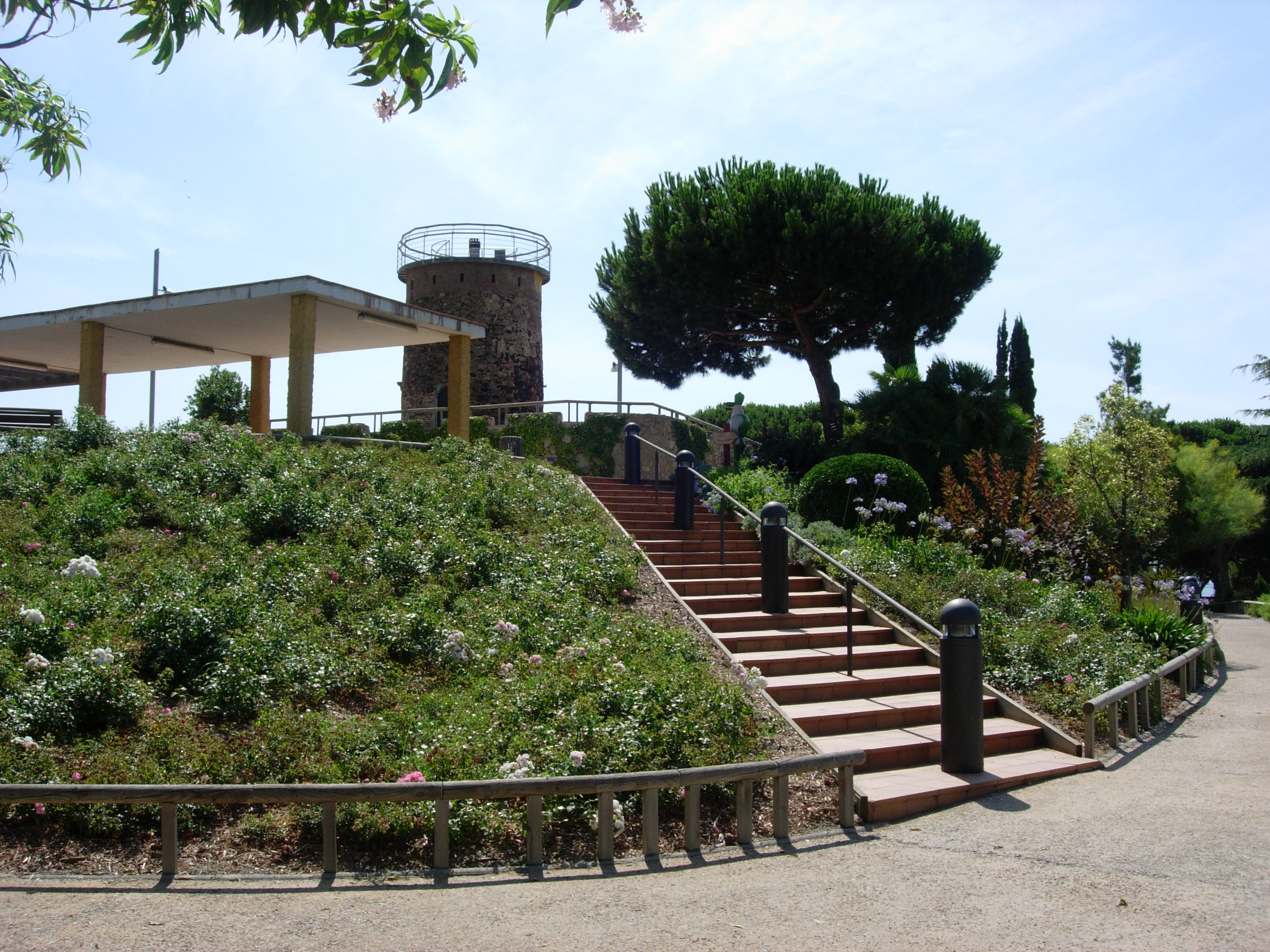
El Castell

- Church of St Nicolau. Built on 16th century and enlarged in the 18th century. Because of its size, it is known as the Cathedral of the Coast.
- Peixateries velles (The old fish market). On the south side there were the meat market, while on the North side there were the fish market. On this later side, the stone-made waiter where the fish was sold is still conserved.
- Town hall. A Modernist style building, which was inaugurated on 15 August 1913.
- La Cooperativa (The Cooperative - The library). One of the oldest buildings in Malgrat, built by the Clapers family in the 16th century. Later, it was a blood hospital (18th century), the Casino Malgratenc (a cultural society) on the 19th century, and a worker's cooperative on the 20th century. Finally, it has become the library in the 21st century.
- Ca l'Arnau. A Modernist style building, built in 1914. Recently, it had been renewed and it has become the Music School.
- The Old Hospital. In 1441, Hug Descolomer founded this hospital to help the poor people. Nowadays it has become a therapeutic center, and its chapel is used as an exhibition gallery
- El Castell. It is a tower located on the top of the hill, just in the center of the town. It is surrounded by a park, and it can be accessed by the Hug Descolomer road, totally constituted by steps, next to the Passatge dels Arcs (Arches passage). The park offers a panoramical view of Malgrat and its surrounding areas.
- Torre d'en Riera (also called Torre de la Vídua de Can Sala). It's a Modernist style house.
- Parc de Can Campassol. It is a park located in Carrer de Mar street. It housed a colonial style house where Zenobia Camprubí was born (the wife of Juan Ramón Jiménez, Nobel Award of Literature, 1956). In the artificial lake of the park there is a sculpture of her.
- La Pilona. It is an artificial island located in the middle of the sea. In the 1910s, it was used to load ships with mineral extracted from the mines of Can Palomeres, in the mountains located in the North of Malgrat. There was an aerial structure to transport the mineral from the mines towards the platform. Today is home to many shags.
- Torre de l'Esquena. It is a house designed in 1895.
- Plaça de Marià Cubí. It is a square inaugurated in 1956. The sculpture is dedicated to Marià Cubí i Soler, born in Malgrat in 1801, who became a frenologist and linguist.

=== Natural places and parks ===
- Pla de Pineda. Located behind the hotels in Passeig Marítim. This space has conserved the agriculture in spite of the hard urbanistic pressure. It is very pleasant to take a walk around this place
- Pla de Grau. Located at the east of the town, between Malgrat and the Tordera river. It is the greatest agricultural space in Malgrat. Produce include the fesols del ganxet (a variety of white beans). This space has been protected.
- Mouth of the Tordera. Usually, the Tordera river is dry in many parts of its course, but there is a lake in its mouth. There can be found a lot of bird species.
- Parc Francesc Macià. The newest and biggest park in Malgrat, home to fantastic figures inspired by children tales.

=== Beaches ===
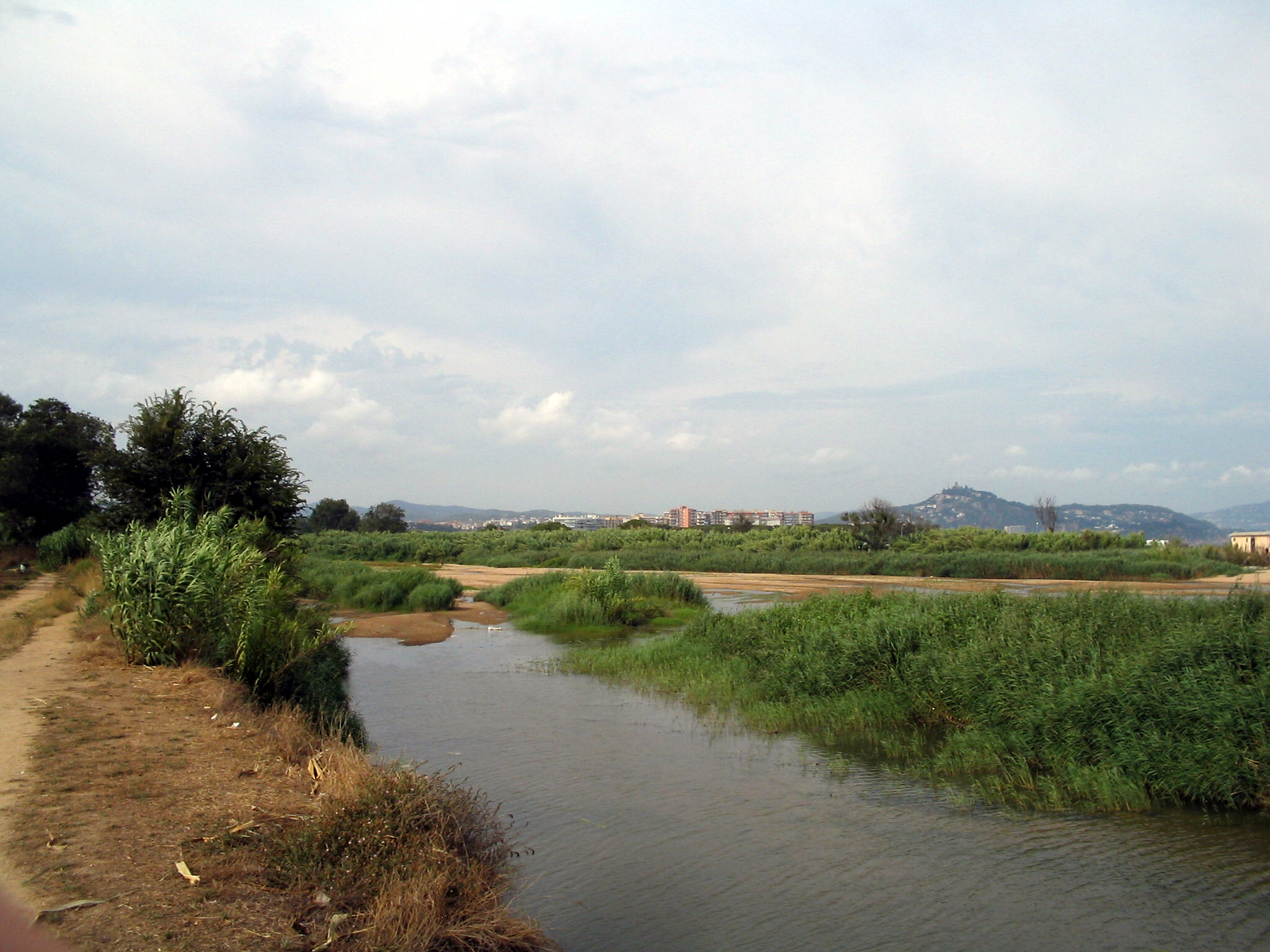
The mouth of the Tordera

- L'Astillero. Located opposite to the tourist hotel zone.
- Central beach. Located In front of downtown Malgrat.
- Tordera Mouth beach. The largest beach in Malgrat. It extends from Malgrat downtown to the Tordera mouth. There is a nudist zone.

== Twin towns ==
- Cárdenas, Nicaragua
- Incisa in Val d'Arno, Italy
- Moguer, Spain
- Seynod, France

== Notable people ==
- Fèlix Cardona i Puig (1903–1982), explorer
- Zenòbia Camprubí i Aymar (1887–1956), poet, translator
