= Christina's World (song) =

Single by The Big Dish

from the album Swimmer
- B-side: "Everlasting Faith"
- Released: 5 January 1987
- Length: 4:10
- Label: Virgin
- Songwriter(s): Steven Lindsay
- Producer(s): Ian Ritchie

The Big Dish singles chronology
"Prospect Street" (1986)	"Christina's World" (1987)	"European Rain" (1988)

"Christina's World" is a song by Scottish pop band The Big Dish, released on 5 January 1987 as the third and final single from their debut studio album Swimmer (1986). The song was written by Steven Lindsay and produced by Ian Ritchie. "Christina's World" reached No. 84 in the UK Singles Chart in January 1987 and remained in the Top 100 for four weeks.

== Background ==
The song references and is inspired by the 1948 painting of the same name by American painter Andrew Wyeth. In a 2021 interview with The Herald, Lindsay recalled, "'Christina's World' was named after Christina Olson, who was the subject of a painting by Andrew Wyeth. I was obsessed by her, so I wrote the song around it, to incorporate what I thought she might be thinking."

== Release ==
The song's release as a single was influenced by comments made by Jonathan King. After the band's appearance on Simon Mayo's BBC Radio 1 show in late 1986, King called the presenter to voice his support and love for the band's work. At the time, the band were struggling to decide which song to lift as a next single from Swimmer, but following King's comments, "Christina's World" was chosen.

== Critical reception ==
On its release as a single, Lesley O'Toole of Record Mirror wrote, "'Christina's World' is yet another leaf from their book of compulsive, enchanting pop. A swayer of a tune tinged with a romantic vision. If this fails, the only viable option is a name change." She described the Big Dish as a "wonderful group" despite what she considered to be a "dodgy" name. Gavin Martin of New Musical Express described the song as being about a "wondrous lass, untainted by the world outside her room". He wrote, "The sentiment may be overly wistful, the sound AOR-unfashionable but a better tune it would be hard to find this week. Delicately stitching the space between portent and pellucid this casts a radiant joy, the warm glow at the song's centre offset by a just out of reach yearning." Martin predicted the song would reach the top 10. Jerry Smith of Music Week considered "Christina's World" to be "another wonderful single from this excellent Scottish band". He added, "Hopefully this time, with its powerful, rousing production sweeping along a captivating melody, their infectious pop will gain mass attention."

Paul Henderson of Kerrang! noted that the "simple, driving bass line makes it perfect in-car listening, and therefore a likely contender in America". He added that both "Christina's World" and the band's previous single "Slide" "show[s] the Big Dish's ability to write quality pop/rock songs". Paul Benbow of the Reading Evening Post felt it to be "low key rock without so much as a redeeming feature". John Lee of the Huddersfield Daily Examiner praised it as "pop of genuine quality by a band which has shown that it really can deliver the goods" and expressed his hope that the song would be a hit. Roy Wilkinson of Sounds felt the Big Dish would "benefit from some of their subject's awkwardness because here they have a fine song smothered by the sheer obviousness of its insipid presentation". He continued, "With a little less eagerness and a dash of understatement, the inherent mystery of 'Christina's World' would be put in more effective surroundings."

== Track listing ==
7" single

1. "Christina's World" – 4:10
2. "Everlasting Faith" – 4:06

12" single

1. "Christina's World" – 4:10
2. "Everlasting Faith" – 4:06
3. "She Says Nothing" – 3:28

== Personnel ==
The Big Dish

- Steven Lindsay – vocals, guitar, keyboards
- Brian McFie – lead guitar, second guitar
- Raymond Docherty – bass

Production

- Ian Ritchie – producer and programming on "Christina's World"
- Chris Sheldon – engineer on "Christina's World"
- Geoff Pesche – mastering on "Christina's World"
- Glyn Johns – producer on "Everlasting Faith"
- The Big Dish – producer on "She Says Nothing"

Other

- Mike Prior – photography
- David Timmis – still life photography
- Ranch Associates – design

== Charts ==
Chart (1987)	Peak position
UK Singles (OCC)	84
