= European Rain =

Single by The Big Dish

from the album Creeping Up on Jesus
- B-side: "Voodoo Baby"
- Released: 18 July 1988
- Length: 3:48
- Label: Virgin
- Songwriter(s): Steven Lindsay
- Producer(s): Bruce Lampcov

The Big Dish singles chronology
"Christina's World" (1987)	"European Rain" (1988)	"Faith Healer" (1988)

"European Rain" is a song by Scottish pop band The Big Dish, released on 18 July 1988 as the lead single from their second studio album, Creeping Up on Jesus. The song was written by Steven Lindsay and produced by Bruce Lampcov. "European Rain" reached No. 78 in the UK Singles Chart and remained in the Top 100 for four weeks.

== Background ==
In a 1988 interview with Record Mirror, Lindsay described "European Rain" as "the most obvious single off the new LP". Later in 1991, he revealed that the song was written and recorded after the band's label, Virgin, felt the existing material being recorded for Creeping Up on Jesus lacked hit single potential. The singer told New Musical Express, "We hated it. It was more or less written to order, and maybe it was just as well that it wasn't a hit or we would have been trapped and expected to write the same sort of rubbish over and over again."

== Critical reception ==
On its release as a single, Music & Media described "European Rain" as "a charming and infectious pop song, well produced by Bruce Lampcov". Jerry Smith of Music Week considered it a "strong, dramatic number" with a "smooth American-style sound" which he felt "gives them a good opportunity to break through this time". Andrew Hirst of the Huddersfield Daily Examiner praised it for being a "catchy little number which bounces along quite pleasantly". He added, "Someone can be heard tinkling the ivories in the background, while both trumpet and guitar solos add to the appeal".

Bury Free Press gave the single an 8 out of 10 rating. The reviewer wrote, "The grainy cover of this single looks promisingly moody, but the song is surprisingly cheerful with its component parts working together very well. This track suggests there is more good stuff to come from the Big Dish." In a review of Creeping Up on Jesus, Jim Krajewski of the Reno Gazette-Journal stated, "'European Rain' is the most likely cut to become the first single heard on the airways because it has that sound that Top 40 radio programmers seem to like."

== Track listing ==
7" single

1. "European Rain" – 3:48
2. "Voodoo Baby" – 4:08

12" single

1. "European Rain" – 3:48
2. "Voodoo Baby" – 4:08
3. "Time On Your Own" – 4:03

10" single (limited edition)

1. "European Rain" – 3:48
2. "Voodoo Baby" – 4:08
3. "Time On Your Own" – 4:03
4. "Swimmer" – 5:22

CD single

1. "European Rain" – 3:48
2. "Voodoo Baby" – 4:08
3. "Time On Your Own" – 4:03
4. "Slide" – 5:06

== Personnel ==
Production

- Bruce Lampcov – producer, engineer
- The Big Dish – producers on "Voodoo Baby" and "Time On Your Own"
- Ian Ritchie – producer on "Swimmer" and "Slide"
- Chris Sheldon – engineer on "Swimmer" and "Slide"

Other

- VIVID I.D. – design
- Ewan Fraser – photography

== Charts ==
Chart (1988)	Peak position
UK Singles (OCC)	78
