= 25 Años =

25 Años (Spanish) or 25 Anos (Portuguese) may refer to:

- 25 Años (El Tri album)
- 25 Años, an album by Flema
- 25 Años, an album by El Chaqueño
- 25 Anos, an album by Roberta Miranda
- 25 Anos, an album by Tony Carreira

== See also ==
- Celebracion de los 25 Años de Juan Gabriel en Bellas Artes
- 25 Años en Directo, an album by Martirio
