= 25 Years (The Big Dish song) =

Single by The Big Dish

from the album Satellites
- B-side: "Swimmer"
- Released: 20 May 1991
- Length: 3:27
- Label: East West
- Songwriter(s): Steven Lindsay
- Producer(s): The Big Dish

The Big Dish singles chronology
"Big Town" (1991)	"25 Years" (1991)

"25 Years" is a song by Scottish pop band The Big Dish, released on 20 May 1991 as the third and final single from their third and final studio album, Satellites. The song was written by Steven Lindsay and was produced by the Big Dish. It reached number 87 in the UK Singles Chart.

== Background ==
"25 Years" was inspired by a recurring nightmare that the band's frontman Steven Lindsay had about having murdered someone. He explained to the Daily Record in 1990, "It was inspired by a recurring dream. I used to wake up thinking I'd killed someone. It happened so often, it got me thinking that maybe I had actually murdered somebody, and buried them in a ditch somewhere. I became convinced that I'd done something terrible, so I wrote a song about it in which I was put away in prison for 25 years for murder."

== Release ==
A remixed version of "25 Years" was released as the third and final single from Satellites on 20 May 1991. The three B-sides included across the different formats of the single were all recorded live at the Glasgow Barrowlands on 13 March 1991 by Clyde 1 FM. The tracks were exclusive to the single.

"25 Years" reached its peak of number 87 in its first week in the UK Singles Chart on 1 June 1991 then dropped down to number 94 the following week. It gained enough airplay on UK radio to peak at number 45 in the Music Week Playlist Chart on 15 June 1991.

The single proved to be the band's final release, with the exception of the 1994 compilation album Rich Man's Wardrobe – A Concise History of The Big Dish. After the disappointing sales of Satellites and the "Big Town" and "25 Years" singles, East West dropped the Big Dish from their roster in June 1991, and the band decided to split soon after.

== Critical reception ==
Upon its release as a single, Steve Stewart of the Aberdeen Press and Journal awarded five out of five stars and wrote, "Excellent, catchy single from this Glasgow group, who are destined to be big. If this does not reach the top 10 then I'll eat my favourite flowery tie." Peter Kinghorn of the Newcastle Evening Chronicle described the song as a "solid, classy sound from a talented band". Jane Downing of the Sunday Sun called it "nothing short of excellent" and added, "The Big Dish have taken the best track off Satellites and thrown it at an unsuspecting world as a single." The Leicester Mercury gave a verdict of "outside chance" and stated, "The Big Dish are possibly one of the most underrated groups to have come out of Scotland. Whether this song will be their second hit [after] 'Miss America' is doubtful."

== Track listing ==
7-inch and cassette single (UK and Europe)

1. "25 Years" (remix) – 3:27
2. "Swimmer" (live) – 5:27

12-inch and CD single (UK and Europe)

1. "25 Years" (remix) – 3:27
2. "Swimmer" (live) – 5:27
3. "Jealous" (live) – 4:28
4. "Refugee" (live) – 3:54

== Personnel ==
"25 Years"

- Steve Lindsay – vocals, guitar, harmonica
- Brian McFie – slide guitar
- Craig Armstrong – keyboards
- Raymond Docherty – bass
- Skip Reid – drums

Production

- The Big Dish – production (all tracks), remixing ("25 Years")
- Robin Rankin – engineering ("25 Years")
- Felix Kendall – mix engineering ("25 Years")
- Pete Shipton – engineering (live tracks)

Other

- Matthew Donaldson – photography

== Charts ==
Chart (1991)	Peak position
UK Singles Chart (OCC)	87
UK Playlist Chart (Music Week)	45
