= Miss America (The Big Dish song) =

Single by The Big Dish

from the album Satellites
- B-side: "From the Mission Bell to the Deep Blue Sea"
- Released: 7 January 1991
- Length: 3:58
- Label: East West
- Songwriters: Steven Lindsay; Craig Armstrong; Brian McFie
- Producer: Warne Livesey

The Big Dish singles chronology
"Life" (1989)	"Miss America" (1991)	"Big Town" (1991)

"Miss America" is a song by Scottish pop band The Big Dish, released on 7 January 1991 by East West Records as the lead single from their third and final studio album, Satellites (1991). The song was written by Steven Lindsay, Craig Armstrong and Brian McFie, and produced by Warne Livesey.

"Miss America" peaked at No. 37 on the UK Singles Chart and remained in the Top 100 for five weeks. It was the band's only single to reach the UK Top 75. The song also reached No. 16 on the Music Week Playlist Chart. A music video was filmed to promote the single.

== Background ==
Lindsay has described "Miss America" as being about a woman who is "beautiful in a lot of ways, but she's not intelligent". He elaborated in an interview with The Northern Echo in 1991, "It's the story of a beauty queen going through the tunnel and out the other end. It's usually females who are not particularly bright but blessed with good looks; they are treated like pieces of meat and then they end up back where they started from – no better off." Despite its title, Lindsay said the song was not meant to be taken as an "anti-American statement". He said, "It's about something that happens everywhere, not just in America."

Lindsay felt "Miss America" brought the band back on track sound wise, telling The List in 1990, "'Miss America' is a bit more like the stuff on Swimmer. I think we lost our way a bit on the second album."

As the band's debut release on East West, "Miss America" successfully broke the band in the top 40 of the UK Singles Chart. Lindsay told The Independent in 1991 of his surprise at the song's success, "We're not fashionable, and we've tried to stick to our original plan. We thought 'Miss America' would be representative of us, but didn't think it would be a big hit single."

== Critical reception ==
On its release as a single, Music & Media described "Miss America" as "evocative, thoughtful and engaging pop" with "passionate vocals" from Lindsay. David Quantick of New Musical Express stated, "That wisting Blue Nile vocal loads into a rhythm produced with all the beauty of, erm, a rhythm produced quite well. This record has all the character of a second hand opinion. These people are the Gerry and the Pacemakers of the 1987 Scots rock scene." David Owens of the South Wales Echo felt the song was "alluring in a sort of dark, damp, soppy winter's night [kind of] way". He believed fans of the "rather catchy pop/soul overtones" of Wet Wet Wet and Deacon Blue would like the track.

John Harris of Sounds described it as "a polished, impassioned tune" and "the kind of praiseworthy song that occasionally tops the American charts". However, he also noted a lack of "excitement" in the track, only "the sound of well-dressed earnest young men working in well-upholstered studios à la Sting and Peter Gabriel". Harris concluded, "Arrogant party sexpots like Tim Burgess are today's gods, and sensitive, eloquent but ultimately boring records like this aren't gonna change that." In the US, Billboard considered the song to be "sensitive" and "lyrically and rhythmically poetic" which "evoke[s] images of quiet, unsettling desperation". They added, "[The] track takes on a number of visionary transitions in its quest to relate a story that is individual, yet hauntingly universal."

In a review of Satellites, Hi-Fi News & Record Review praised the song as "a classy pop song with memorable hook-lines". Adam Sweeting of The Guardian commented, "The smooth, dreamy textures and Lindsay's perfectly polished tunes make this ideal late-night driving fodder, especially 'Miss America' or 'Give Me Some Time'."

== Track listing ==
- 7" single
1. "Miss America" – 3:58
2. "From the Mission Bell to the Deep Blue Sea" – 3:15
- 12" single
1. "Miss America" – 3:58
2. "From the Mission Bell to the Deep Blue Sea" – 3:15
3. "The Town Celebrity" – 4:12
- CD single
1. "Miss America" – 3:58
2. "From the Mission Bell to the Deep Blue Sea" – 3:15
3. "The Town Celebrity" – 4:12
4. "Roll Down the Flag" – 4:12
- CD single (US promo)
1. "Miss America" – 3:58

== Personnel ==
Miss America

- Steve Lindsay – vocals, guitar
- Brian McFie – guitar, backing vocals
- Craig Armstrong – piano, keyboards
- Warne Livesey – programming

Production

- Warne Livesey – producer of "Miss America"
- Steven Lindsay – producer of "From the Mission Bell to the Deep Blue Sea", "The Town Celebrity" and "Roll Down the Flag"
- Richard Moakes – engineer on "Miss America"
- Felix Kendall – mix engineer on "Miss America"

Other

- John Stoddart – photography

== Charts ==
Chart (1991)	Peak position
Europe (European Hit Radio)	24
Netherlands (Single Top 100)	47
Netherlands (Tipparade)	5
UK Singles (OCC)	37
UK Airplay (Music Week)	16
