= Fèlix Cardona i Puig =

Catalan explorer

- Born: February 3, 1903; Malgrat de Mar, Maresme
- Died: December 5, 1982 (aged 79); Caracas
- Occupations: Pilot, explorer of South America
- Known for: Made several expeditions across the Venezuelan Guyana
- Spouse: Carlot Votti

Fèlix Cardona i Puig (Malgrat de Mar, Maresme, February 3, 1903 – Caracas, December 5, 1982) was a Spanish explorer of the Venezuelan Guyana.

== Biography ==
The son of Fèlix Cardona i Paradeda and Josefa Puig i Comas, Cardona was educated at the boarding school of Collell and studied later in the Nautical School of Barcelona. He finished his studies in 1922 and embarked on a ship. After a practice trip, he stayed in Venezuela due to his interest in exploration. Later, he returned to Malgrat de Mar and founded a textile factory but had to escape to Venezuela due to economic problems.

Cardona made several expeditions, staying a long time with the natives. Together with Joan Maria Mundó i Freixas, he organised an expedition to the southwest of Venezuela starting in San Pedro de las Bocas, along the rivers Caroni and Caruao until they arrived to the Auyán-tepui, discovering the waterfall now known as Angel Falls (in honour of Jimmie Angel, but in the native tongue were designated as Churun Merú).

During the 1930s and 1940s, Cardona collected field notes of various indigenous languages in Venezuela, including Arutani, Sapé, and Saliban languages. Much of the data remains unpublished in his notebooks, which are currently held in the Malgrat de Mar Municipal Archives (Catalan: Arxiu Municipal de Malgrat de Mar).

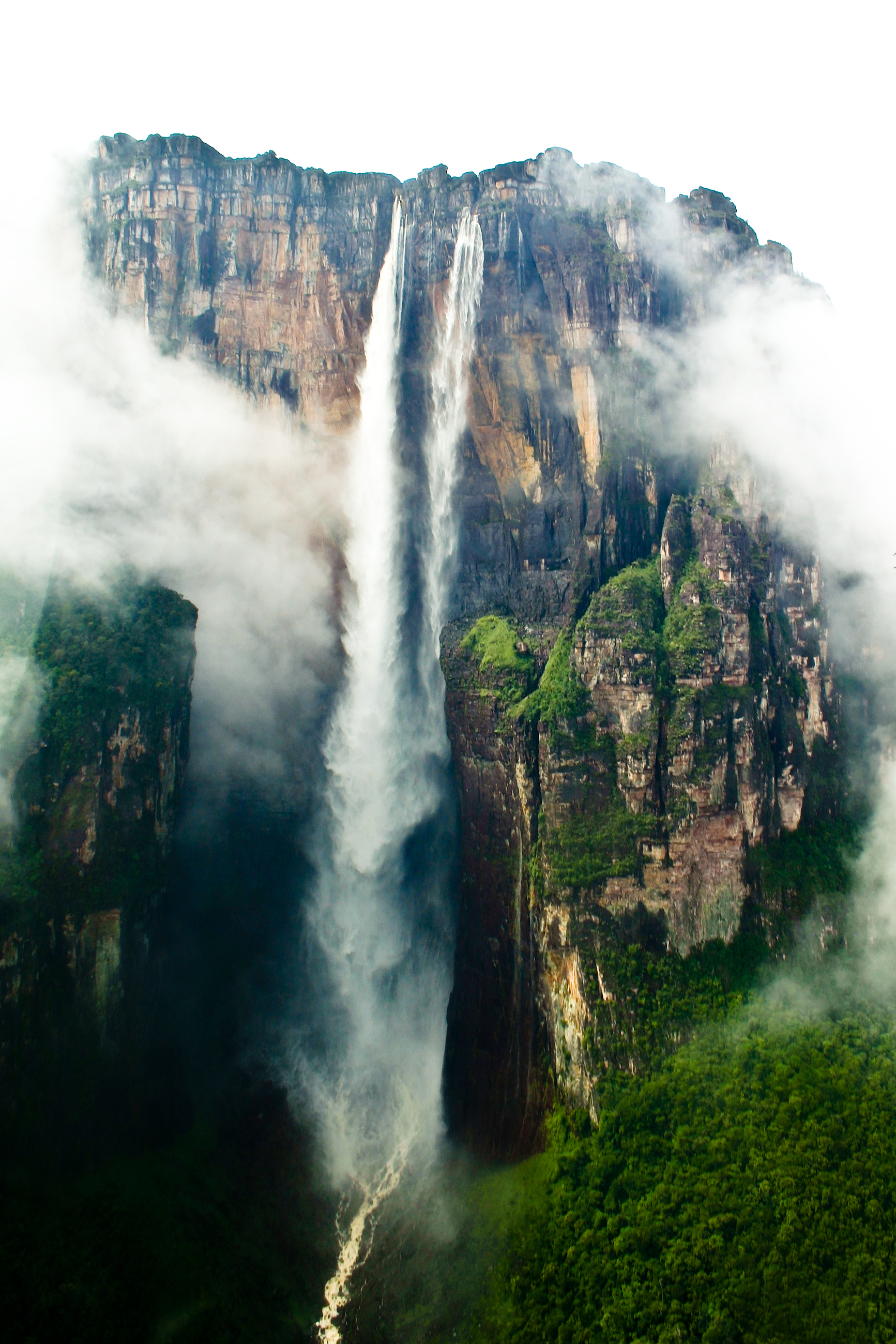
Angel Falls discovered by Cardona-Mundó.

On January 25, 1932, Cardona married Carlot Votti ("Loti"), of Dresden, Germany. In 1937, Cardona accompanied Jimmie Angel flying over the Churún Merú. Angel later on tried to land on the top, crashing the plane, but he survived, and Cardona (who stayed in the base) did not come to his rescue. In 1946, he was designated a Botanic Explorer by the "Dirección de fronteras del Ministerio de Relaciones Interiores de Venezuela" (Direction of Borders of the Ministry of Inner Relations of Venezuela). Many plant species and even some animals have been named after him, for they were discovered by him. He contributed to the preparation of maps of Venezuela and doubly made several discoveries, among them the above-mentioned Angel Falls not reckoned like that by Revista de Fomento, the authority having jurisdiction. He died in Caracas in 1982.

== See also ==
- Francisco de Orellana

== Bibliography ==
- FUNDACIÓN POLAR: Diccionario Histórico de Venezuela. Artículo sobre la biografía de Fèlix Cardona. Caracas: Fundación Polar, 1992.
- GRASES, Pere. "Fèlix Cardona y Puig. Mito y realidad en el corazón de América del Sur (Ensayo de interpretación personal)". Caracas: Tierra Firme, Patronato de Cultura del Centro Catalán de Caracas. Ayuntamiento de Malgrat, Generalitat de Catalunya, Instituto Catalán de Cooperación Iberoamericana, Instituto Municipal de Historia del Ayuntamiento de Barcelona. Imprimido a ROMARGRAF, S. a., L'Hospitalet de Llobregat, 1983.
- HUBER, Otto. Chimantá, Escudo de Guayana, Venezuela. Caracas: Edit:Ex Libris, 1992. Esta obra incluye algunas fotos de Fèlix Cardona, quién acompañó y guió al propio Huber en la expedición altepuy guaianès.
- RÖHL, Eduardo. Historia de las ciencias geográficas de Venezuela (1498–1948). Caracas: edición de Héctor Pérez Marchelli, Talleres Gráficos Cromotip, 1990, 514 pp. El artículo biográfico sobre Fèlix Cardona fue redactado por el editor Héctor Pérez Marchelli para la edición póstuma del libro de Röhl.
- Vázquez-Figueroa, Alberto. Ícaro. (1998).
