= Bolivian Express =

English-language monthly magazine in Bolivia

Bolivian Express is a monthly, English-language magazine freely distributed in various locations throughout Bolivia. The magazine is based in La Paz and its content is created mostly by interns who come to the city from various countries to work with the publication. The magazine began in 2010 as a way to strengthen the relationship between Bolivia and the English-speaking world. Each month the magazine covers a different theme.

== See also ==
- List of newspapers in Bolivia
