= Big Town (song) =

Single by The Big Dish

from the album Satellites
- B-side: "Good Way"
- Released: 25 February 1991
- Length: 4:02
- Label: East West
- Songwriter: Steven Lindsay
- Producer: Warne Livesey

The Big Dish singles chronology
"Miss America" (1991)	"Big Town" (1991)	"25 Years" (1991)

"Big Town" is a song by Scottish pop band The Big Dish, released on 25 February 1991 as the second single from their third and final studio album, Satellites (1991). The song was written by Steven Lindsay and produced by Warne Livesey.

For its release as a single, "Big Town" was remixed by Livesey and The Big Dish. East West considered the single to be one of their "priority releases" at the time. As the follow-up to the band's top 40 hit "Miss America", "Big Town" peaked at No. 94 in the UK Singles Chart and remained in the Top 100 for two weeks. It was the band's last entry in the UK Top 100.

== Critical reception ==
On its release, Tim Peacock of Sounds praised "Big Town" as "a sure-fire hit pop choon", "the most brazenly obvious 45 choice" from Satellites and a track which "falls happily to the correct side of the scything stadium rock machine". He commented, "Pepped up by brass and lashings of girly harmonies, the chorus is smooth and confident, while Lindsay's voice attains control without ever beginning to strain". Music & Media wrote, "Growing bigger and bigger. Second single from their sophisticated, soulful pop album Satellites and follow-up to their recent hit 'Miss America'. Big Dish, Big Town, Big Hit..." Billy Sloan of the Daily Record commented that the song, as the follow-up to "Miss America", "sounds like another smash to me". In a review of Satellites, Dan Kening of the Chicago Tribune described the song as "hook-filled" and noted Lindsay's "crystalline lead vocals".

== Track listing ==
- 7" single
1. "Big Town" (Remix) – 4:02
2. "Good Way" – 4:32
- 12" single
1. "Big Town" (Remix) – 4:02
2. "Good Way" – 4:32
3. "He Stumbled on Some Magic" – 3:51
- CD single
1. "Big Town" (Remix) – 4:02
2. "Good Way" – 4:32
3. "He Stumbled on Some Magic" – 3:51
4. "Medicine Jar" – 3:15
- CD single (US promo)
1. "Big Town" (Remix) – 4:01
2. "Big Town" (LP Version) – 4:05

== Personnel ==
Big Town

- Steve Lindsay – vocals, guitar
- Brian McFie – guitar
- Craig Armstrong – keyboards, piano
- John Giblin – bass
- Jody Linscott – percussion
- Shirley Lewis, Carol Kenyon – backing vocals
- Warne Livesey – programming

Production

- Warne Livesey – producer of "Big Town", remix of "Big Town"
- The Big Dish – remix of "Big Town"
- Steven Lindsay – producer of "Good Way", "He Stumbled on Some Magic" and "Medicine Jar"
- Richard Moakes – engineer on "Big Town"
- Felix Kendall – mix engineer on "Big Town"

Other

- John Stoddart – photography

== Charts ==
Chart (1991)	Peak position
UK Singles (OCC)	94
UK Airplay (Music Week)	47
