= Uncia (mine) =

Tin mine in Potosí, Bolivia

Coordinates: 18°27′00″S 66°37′00″W

Uncia is a tin mine in the department of Potosí, capital of the Rafael Bustillo province in western Bolivia. It was served by a railway branch from Oruro. It was one of the mines owned by Simón Iturri Patiño.
