= El Tunari =

El Tunari is a weekly newspaper published in Quillacollo, Bolivia. The newspaper began publication on 26 February 2011.
