= The Big Dish (band) =

Scottish pop band

- Origin: Airdrie, Scotland
- Genres: Pop
- Years active: 1983–1991, 2012, 2014
- Past members: Steven Lindsay; Brian McFie; Mark Ryce; John Harper; Stewart Hall; Paul Albertis; John Hendry; Raymond Docherty; Skip Reid; Craig Armstrong; David Brownlie

The Big Dish are a Scottish pop band formed in Airdrie, Scotland in 1983. The band initially comprised Steven Lindsay (vocals/guitar), David Brownlie (drums), Stuart Hall (saxophone), Mark Ryce (guitar), and John Harper (keyboards). The band was subsequently augmented on stage by Paul Albertis (bass) and John Hendry (drums). As well as releasing three studio albums, the band performed live as support to Lloyd Cole and Big Country and Del Amitri.

== Career ==
By the time their debut album Swimmer was released on Virgin Records in 1986 the line-up had undergone notable changes. Lindsay and Raymond Docherty were joined by new guitarist Brian McFie, keyboardist/saxophonist Ian Ritchie (album recordings only), Allan Dumbreck (live performances) on keyboards and Dave Cantwell (live performances) replacing John Hendry on drums. Tracks on Swimmer were significantly polished versions of the tracks that had been played live up until then.

Lindsay, McFie and Docherty then completed the follow-up album Creeping Up on Jesus in 1988 with session musicians — including drummer Blair Cunningham and horn men Gary Barnacle & John Thirkell, Craig Armstrong and Paul Wickens (keyboards). Despite Bruce Lampcov's muscular production, this second effort proved commercially unsuccessful and the band was dropped from Virgin, when Lindsay refused to countenance recording a cover version.

Lindsay and McFie recorded the band's last album Satellites for the American East West label (a subsidiary of Warner Bros. Records) in 1991. They had assistance from Armstrong, Docherty, record producer Warne Livesey and a number of session musicians, including bassist Pino Palladino and drummer Manu Katché. They also put together a new touring line-up featuring bassist Tracey Gilbert, drummer Skip Reid and Colin Berwick on keyboards. However, despite critical acclaim for the new record and a hit single ("Miss America" reached No. 37 in the UK Singles Chart), the group disbanded shortly afterwards.

A compilation of the group's work entitled Rich Man's Wardrobe was released by Virgin Records in 1994, featuring cuts from the band's two albums with the label, and the inclusion of rare track "Voodoo Baby".

== Post-Big Dish ==
Not long after the split, Lindsay resumed his partnership with Armstrong. Lindsay provided vocals on Armstrong's 2002 album As If to Nothing. To promote this release, Lindsay returned to the live arena, performing throughout Europe with a thirty-piece orchestra.

Lindsay returned to the fold in late 2004 on his own Seminal label with the piano-driven Exit Music featuring string arrangements by the Scottish Ensemble. Lindsay plays and programmes all other instruments. The Australian edition of the album contains two additional tracks. Lindsay was then signed to Chrysalis Records, and in 2007 the second solo CD Kite was released, including a cover of "Monkey Gone to Heaven", originally by Pixies.

== Reunion ==
The band reunited to play a sold-out show at Glasgow ABC on 21 January 2012 as part of the Celtic Connections festival, and the Darvel Music Festival in May 2012. The lineup for the reunion was Lindsay, McFie, Docherty, Dumbreck and Ross McFarlane (drums). In 2014 Big Dish supported Del Amitri at the Hydro. One new song 'Cherry Blossom Falls' was included in the set.

== Discography ==
=== Albums ===
Year	Album	Peak positions	
Year	Album	UK	NED
1986	Swimmer	85	—
1988	Creeping Up on Jesus	—	—
1991	Satellites	43	85
1994	Rich Man's Wardrobe – A Concise History of The Big Dish	—	—
"—" denotes releases that did not chart or were not released.

=== Singles ===
Year	Single	Peak positions		Album
Year	Single	UK	NED	Album
1985	"Big New Beginning" (UK only)	—	—	Swimmer
1985	"Prospect Street"	166	—	Swimmer
1986	"Slide"	147	—	Swimmer
1986	"Prospect Street" (re-issue)	—	—	Swimmer
1987	"Christina's World"	84	—	Swimmer
1987	"Slide" (re-issue)	86	—	Swimmer
1988	"European Rain" (UK only)	78	—	Creeping Up on Jesus
1988	"Faith Healer" (UK only)	101	—	Creeping Up on Jesus
1989	"Life" (US only)	—	—	Creeping Up on Jesus
1991	"Miss America"	37	47	Satellites
1991	"Big Town"	94	—	Satellites
1991	"25 Years"	87	—	Satellites
"—" denotes releases that did not chart or were not released.
