= Joan Maria Mundó i Freixas =

Spanish explorer

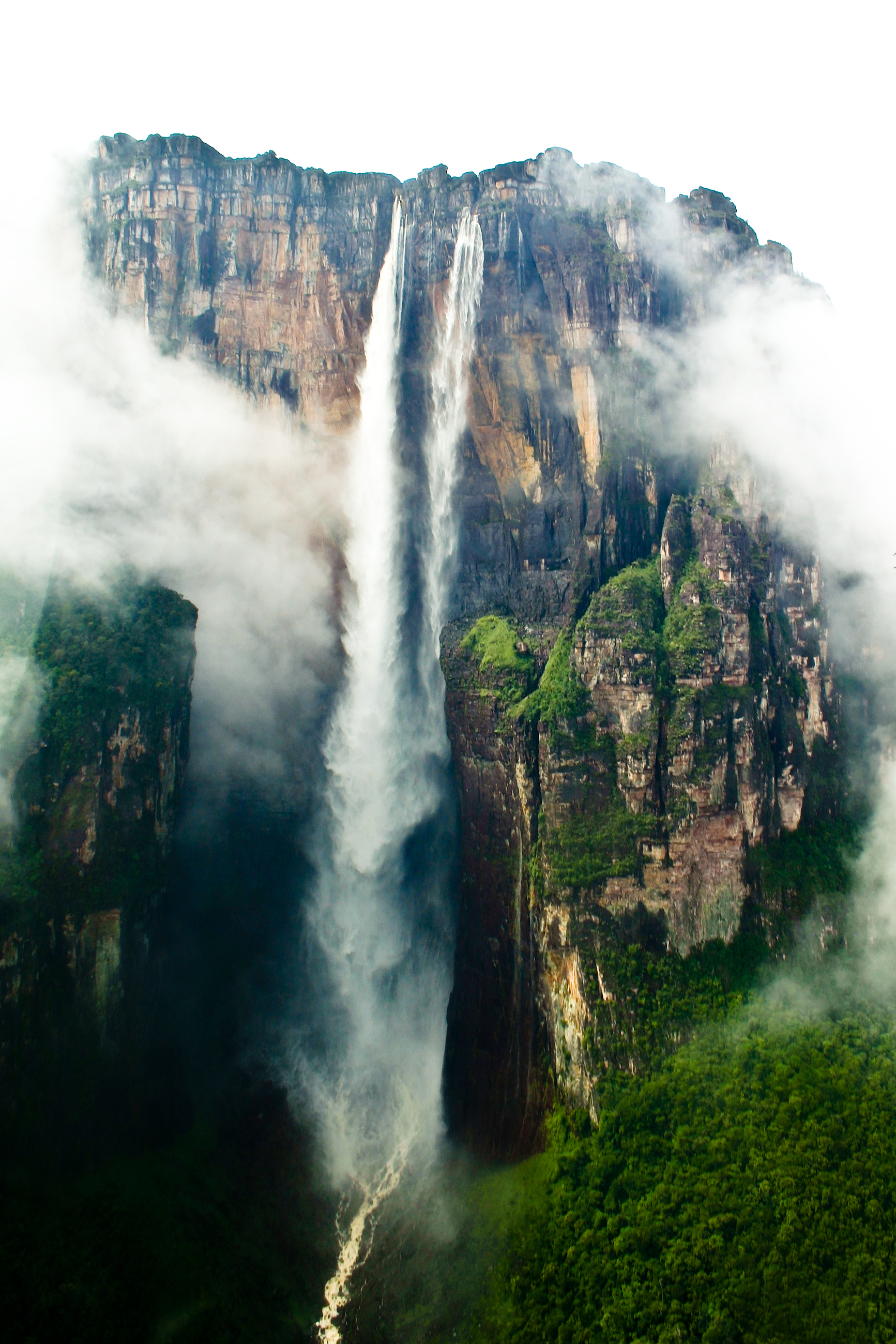
Angel Falls discovered by Cardona-Mundó.

Juan María Mundó Freixas (Barcelona, 1877 – Ciudad Bolívar, 1932) was a Spanish explorer and diamond trader.

In 1927 he organised, together with his son and the also Spanish explorer Fèlix Cardona i Puig, an expedition to the southwest of Venezuela starting in San Pedro de las Bocas, tracing back the rivers Caroni and Caruao until they arrived to the Auyán-tepui, discovering the waterfall known nowadays by the name Angel Falls (in honour of pilot Jimmie Angel, but in the native tongue were designated as Churun Merú). This waterfall has more than 1 km of height and is the highest in the world.

== See also ==
- Angel Falls
- Francisco de Orellana

== Bibliography ==
- FUNDACIÓN POLAR: Diccionario Histórico de Venezuela. Artículo sobre la biografía de Fèlix Cardona. Caracas: Fundación Polar, 1992.
- GRASES, Pere. "Fèlix Cardona y Puig. Mito y realidad al corazón de América del Sur (Ensayo de interpretación personal)". Caracas: Tierra Firme, Patronato de Cultura del Centro Catalán de Caracas. Ayuntamiento de Malgrat, Generalitat de Catalunya, Instituto Catalán de Cooperación Iberoamericana, Instituto Municipal de Historia del Ayuntamiento de Barcelona. Imprimido a ROMARGRAF, S. a., L'Hospitalet de Llobregat, 1983.
- HUBER, Otto. Chimantá, Escudo de Guayana, Venezuela. Caracas: Edit:Ex Libris, 1992. Esta obra incluye algunas fotos de Fèlix Cardona, quién acompañó y guió al propio Huber en la expedición altepuy guaianès.
- RÖHL, Eduardo. Historia de las ciencias geográficas de Venezuela (1498–1948). Caracas: edición de Héctor Pérez Marchelli, Talleres Gráficos Cromotip, 1990, 514 pp. El artículo biográfico sobre Fèlix Cardona fue redactado por el editor Héctor Pérez Marchelli para la edición póstuma del libro de Röhl.
