= Mundus =

Mundus may refer to:

== People ==
- Mundus (general) (died 536), an East Roman general
- Frank Mundus (1925–2008), an American fisher
- Saint Munde (or Mundus; died c. 962), Scottish abbot in Argyll, Scotland

== Places ==
- Mundus, ancient port in northern Somalia on the site of Heis (town)

== Popular culture ==
- Mundus (Devil May Cry), the king of the demon world in the Devil May Cry series of video games
- Mundus (setting), a realm in The Elder Scrolls series of video games

== Ancient Roman culture ==
- Mundus, one of the Latin words for "world"
- Mundus cerialis, a ritual pit connected with the cult of the goddess Ceres

== Other ==
- Erasmus Mundus, the international counterpart of the Erasmus programme
- Mundus furniture, a furniture-manufacturing company

== See also ==
- Mundu, a Malayalam garment
