= Satellites (The Big Dish album) =

Studio album by The Big Dish
- Released: 11 February 1991
- Length: 41:21
- Label: East West
- Producer: Warne Livesey, The Big Dish

The Big Dish chronology
Creeping Up on Jesus (1988)	Satellites (1991)	Rich Man's Wardrobe – A Concise History of The Big Dish (1994)

Satellites is the third and final studio album from Scottish pop band The Big Dish, which was released by East West in 1991. The album peaked at No. 43 in the UK Albums Chart and remained in the Top 100 for two weeks.

The album spawned three singles; "Miss America" reached No. 37 in the UK Singles Chart, providing the band with their only UK Top 75 entry. The follow-up, "Big Town", reached No. 94 and the third single, a remix of "25 Years", failed to chart. After the disappointing sales of Satellites, "Big Town" and "25 Years", East West dropped the Big Dish in June 1991, and the band decided to split soon after.

== Background ==
Speaking of the meaning behind the album's title, vocalist and guitarist Steven Lindsay stated, "People can be like satellites, congregating around other[s]. Some of the songs on [the album] are about lonely people and it has a nice ring to it. The record company didn't like the name, but we said 'too bad'!"

== Critical reception ==
Professional ratings
Review scores
Source	Rating
AllMusic	4/5 stars
Chicago Tribune	3.5/4 stars
Select	3/5 stars

On its release, Adam Sweeting of The Guardian commented, "The smooth, dreamy textures and Lindsay's perfectly polished tunes make this ideal late-night driving fodder." He felt the band's sound had moved towards "American-style FM radio" which was "conspicuously out of sync with the state of British music". Peter Kinghorn of the Evening Chronicle praised the album as "thoughtful and well crafted" and considered Big Dish to have "matured and improved over the past three years like a good wine".

Neil Hodgson of the Liverpool Echo described Satellites as a "slickly-produced effort" with "delicate compositions". He added, "It's refreshing to find a band like the Big Dish who aren't afraid to follow their instincts at a time when melody is considered by a lot of people to be a dirty word." Dan Kening of the Chicago Tribune considered at least half of the album to be "made for American album-rock radio" and praised Lindsay's "crystalline" vocals which "highlight such hook-filled songs as 'Miss America,' '25 Years' and 'Big Town'."

Music & Media described the album as "delightful" and praised Lindsay as "one of the most gifted songwriters of the moment", with Satellites finding him "in very good shape". Billboard considered it "gentle, alternative pop-rock in the Outfield mode" which "hypnotically soothes without ever slipping into dull or repetitive terrain". They singled out "Miss America" and "Give Me Some Time" as the best tracks on the album.

== Track listing ==
All tracks are written by Steven Lindsay except where noted

No.	Title	Writer(s)	Length
1.	"Miss America"	Lindsay, Craig Armstrong, Brian McFie	3:55
2.	"State of the Union"	Lindsay, Armstrong	4:31
3.	"Across the Province"	Lindsay, Armstrong	4:40
4.	"Give Me Some Time"		3:15
5.	"25 Years"		4:05
6.	"Big Town"		4:06
7.	"Shipwrecked"		4:52
8.	"Warning Sign"		3:27
9.	"Bonafide"	Lindsay, Armstrong	4:24
10.	"Learn to Love"		4:07

== Personnel ==
- Steve Lindsay – vocals (track 1–10), guitars (track 1–10), harmonica (track 5), piano (track 8)
- Brian McFie – guitars (track 1–4, 6–9), backing vocals (track 1), machine gun (track 2), slide guitar (track 5, 10)
- Craig Armstrong – piano (track 1–4, 6–7, 9–10), keyboards (track 1–10), arranger (track 3), violin (track 7), string arrangement (track 10)
- Warne Livesey – programming (track 1–3, 6, 8–10), arranger (track 3), string arrangement (track 10)
- Pino Palladino – bass (track 2, 7)
- John Thirkell, Simon Gardener – trumpet (track 2)
- Jamie Talbot, Neil Sidwell – alto saxophone (track 2)
- Chris White, Phil Todd – tenor saxophone (track 2)
- John Giblin – bass (track 3–4, 6, 8–9)
- Jody Linscott – percussion (track 3, 6)
- The Astarti String Orchestra – strings (track 3, 10)
- Gavyn Wright – leader (track 3)
- Geoff Dugmore – drums (track 4, 9)
- Skip Reid – drums (track 5)
- Raymond Docherty – bass (track 5)
- Shirley Lewis, Carol Kenyon – backing vocals (track 6, 8)
- Manu Katché – drums (track 7)
- Danny Cummings – percussion (track 7)

Production

- Warne Livesey – producer (tracks 1–4, 6–10)
- Richard Moakes – engineer (tracks 1–4, 6–10)
- The Big Dish – producers (track 5)
- Robin Rankin – engineer (track 5)
- Felix Kendall – mix engineer
- Richard Arnold, Andrew Patterson, Bruce Davies, Matt Howe, Spencer May – assistant engineers

Other

- John Stoddart – photography

== Charts ==
Chart (1991)	Peak position
Dutch Albums (Album Top 100)	85
UK Albums (OCC)	43
