= El Día (Santa Cruz de la Sierra) =

- Type: Daily newspaper, morning newspaper
- Format: Tabloid
- Owner: Editorial Día a Día S.A.
- Founder: Luis Gutiérrez Dams
- Founded: October 13, 1987; 38 years ago
- Language: Spanish
- Headquarters: Av. Cristo Redentor, km 7, Santa Cruz de la Sierra
- Price: BOB 4
- Website: eldia.com.bo

El Día is a newspaper published in Santa Cruz de la Sierra, Bolivia.

== History ==
The newspaper El Día was first published on 13 October 1987 through the initiative of Luis Gutiérrez Dams. Ten years later, it was acquired by the Garafulic Canelas business group, which relaunched it under the name El Nuevo Día. In October 2000, the administration partnered with the Spanish media conglomerate PRISA, becoming part of a multimedia group that included the newspapers La Razón, Extra, and the television channel ATB.

In 2007, PRISA withdrew from Bolivia, selling its stake in El Nuevo Día to economist Alfredo Leigue Urenda. Two years later, in June 2009, politician Branko Marinković acquired all shares of the newspaper, becoming its new owner. Following the change in ownership, the newspaper reverted to its original name, changing from El Nuevo Día back to simply El Día, and also introduced a redesign.
