= Nuevo Sur =

Bolivian newspaper

Nuevo Sur is a newspaper published in Tarija, Bolivia.
