= Creeping Up on Jesus =

Studio album by The Big Dish
- Released: 22 August 1988; 1989 (US)
- Length: 44:54
- Label: Virgin; Warner (US)
- Producer: Bruce Lampcov; Paul Wickens; The Big Dish

The Big Dish chronology
Swimmer (1986)	Creeping Up on Jesus (1988)	Satellites (1991)

Creeping Up on Jesus is the second studio album from Scottish pop band The Big Dish, which was released by Virgin on 22 August 1988.

The album spawned three singles; "European Rain" and "Faith Healer" were released in the United Kingdom, while "Life" was released in the United States. "European Rain" reached No. 78 in the UK Singles Chart in August 1988.

== Background ==
In a 1988 interview with Record Mirror, Lindsay said of the album, "What's new about the stuff we're doing now is that it has a warmer, more direct feel to it. Swimmer was a bit too cold and distant... too over-produced. The new LP sounds more like a band effort."

== Critical reception ==
Professional ratings
Review scores
Source	Rating
AllMusic	2.5/5 stars
The Press and Journal	4/5 stars

On its release, Music & Media praised Creeping Up on Jesus for having "one of the best titles of the year", but felt the material was "too much of a pale imitation of their debut album to cause any great fuss". They recommended "Burn" and "European Rain", and described the band's sound as "a cross between Deacon Blue and Danny Wilson". Billboard noted the band's return "with a brace of folk-edged tunes at times reminiscent of Lloyd Cole."

Barry Young of The Press and Journal considered the album to contain "a series of thoughtful, gentle and appealing tracks, none of which would be out of place in the singles chart". He added, "Light and airy, without being shallow. Music to drive through the country by." George Bryne of the Irish Independent praised the album for being "chock-full of highly-melodic hooks and memorable choruses" which "improves on the seamless pop of their debut".

Scott Benarde of The Palm Beach Post wrote, "Lindsday is a talented writer and arranger. His songs sound like triumphant declarations and hopeful prayers. The songs on the band's second release play like cool, refreshing breezes against sweat-soaked skin." Paul Wagner of the Santa Cruz Sentinel commented, "Scottish pop offering mid-tempo rhythms, clear lyrics, lots of songwriting craft, but an as-yet-undistinguished sound and feel."

In a retrospective review, Richard Foss of AllMusic considered the album's material to contain "some good, catchy, intelligent songs here", but felt they were "buried under several layers of studio gloss", with Lindsay's vocals "competing with too much atmosphere". He added, "A few tracks succeed through sheer gifted songcraft and heartfelt performances, but only enough to show that this good band could have been great."

== Track listing ==
All tracks are written by Steven Lindsay except "Waiting for the Parade" by Lindsay and Brian McFie and "Where Do You Live?" by Lindsay and Paul Wickens.

No.	Title	Length
1.	"Life"	4:43
2.	"Waiting for the Parade"	4:24
3.	"Faith Healer"	3:59
4.	"Burn"	3:26
5.	"Swansong"	4:40
6.	"European Rain"	3:50
7.	"Jean"	3:38
8.	"Monday"	4:28
9.	"Wishing Time"	3:57
10.	"Where Do You Live"	3:41

UK CD version bonus track
No.	Title	Length
11.	"Can't Stand Up"	4:01

US Warner Bros. release
No.	Title	Length
1.	"Life"	4:43
2.	"Waiting for the Parade"	4:24
3.	"Faith Healer"	3:59
4.	"Burn"	3:26
5.	"Swansong"	4:40
6.	"Can't Stand Up"	4:01
7.	"European Rain"	3:50
8.	"Jean"	3:38
9.	"Monday"	4:28
10.	"Wishing Time"	3:57
11.	"Where Do You Live"	3:41

== Personnel ==
The Big Dish

- Steven Lindsay – vocals, guitars
- Brian McFie – guitars
- Raymond Docherty – bass

Additional musicians

- Craig Armstrong, Paul Wickens, Michael Montes – keyboards
- Blair Cunningham, Charlie Morgan – drums
- John Thirkell, Gary Barnacle, Pete Thoms – horns

Production

- Bruce Lampcov – producer (tracks 1–8), engineer (tracks 1–8)
- Paul Wickens – producer (tracks 9–10), engineer (tracks 9–10)
- The Big Dish – producer (track 2)
- Kenny MacDonald – engineer (track 2)
- Pete Jones, Lance Phillips, Jeremy Wheatley – assistant engineers

Other

- Gary Wathen – art direction
- VIVID I.D. – design
- Ewan Fraser – photography
- Walker Evans – original church photography
