= Swimmer (The Big Dish album) =

Studio album by The Big Dish
- Released: 29 September 1986
- Length: 53:08
- Label: Virgin; Warner (US)
- Producer: Ian Ritchie, Glyn Johns, Paul Hardiman, The Big Dish

The Big Dish chronology
Swimmer (1986)	Creeping Up on Jesus (1988)

Swimmer is the debut studio album from Scottish pop band The Big Dish, which was released by Virgin in 1986.

The album contains three singles: "Slide", "Prospect Street" and "Christina's World". "Christina's World" reached No. 84 in the UK Singles Chart in January 1987 and "Slide" peaked at No. 86 in May 1987.

== Critical reception ==
Professional ratings
Review scores
Source	Rating
AllMusic	3/5 stars
Record-Journal	C
The Sheboygan Press	3/4 stars
Sounds	3/5 stars

Upon its release, Music & Media picked Swimmer as one of their "Albums of the Week" during October 1986. They described the songs as "alternating between guitar-influenced and atmospheric, melodic material". They also noted Lindsay's "strong vocals" which "lift the material up to a higher plane". Paul Massey of the Evening Express noted, "Warmth and sincerity are the trademarks of Lindsay's mellow pop and the single 'Slide' is simply great." Martin Wells of the Derby Evening Telegraph described Swimmer as containing "some delightful Orange Juice/Lloyd Cole-style pop songs". John Wilde of Sounds called the Big Dish "finely carved" with "tongue-lashings of melody, "some flourishing narrative" and an "agility to their pop that you can barely resist". He did, however, note their "inability to finally detonate" as the album, "aimed at the thoughtful [and] spun around in a palatable bustle", showed the band "rare[ly] dash[ing] beyond this sweet sleep, this breathing space". He added, "If anything, they bat on a similar sticky wicket to something like Prefab Sprout, with all the right guile and gumption, but no way to channel it to brilliance. There's all the right curves and some of the right turns, but none of the real flesh."

In the US, Billboard noted the band's "strong song sense" but added that "what may catch ears is the vocalizing of David Byrne sound-alike Steven Lindsay." Cash Box wrote, "Lindsay's whispy voice and strong-based songwriting recommend the group to a wide audience. The band is at its best on heartfelt, melody-rich songs like 'Prospect Street' and 'Slide'." Brant Houston of the Hartford Courant described Swimmer as "a persuasive effort but sometimes too tidy". He added, "The songs are often sprightly, with '60s-like choruses that keep afloat the tunes that tend toward the moribund." Jim Zebora of the Record-Journal as "accessible, insistent pop" but that the band "has a tendency to fall into mediocrity with many songs".

In a retrospective review, William Ruhlmann of AllMusic considered the album's material to be "tasteful, cultured and a bit dull". He commented, "The guitars chime, the machine-made beats burble, and Lindsay contemplates existence, but there is a difference between swimming and treading water that he doesn't seem to recognize."

== Track listing ==
All tracks are written by Steven Lindsay except "Second Swimmer" by Lindsay and Brian McFie.

No.	Title	Length
1.	"Prospect Street"	3:23
2.	"Christina's World"	4:10
3.	"Slide"	5:08
4.	"Big New Beginning"	3:23
5.	"Another People's Palace"	4:49
6.	"Swimmer"	5:22
7.	"The Loneliest Man in the World"	3:40
8.	"Jealous"	4:28
9.	"Her Town"	3:58
10.	"Beyond the Pale"	3:58
11.	"Second Swimmer"	2:41

UK CD version bonus tracks
No.	Title	Length
12.	"From the Neighbourhood"	3:44
13.	"Back Door Bound"	4:05

== Personnel ==
The Big Dish

- Steven Lindsay – vocals, guitar, keyboards
- Brian McFie – lead guitar, second guitar
- Raymond Docherty – bass

Additional musicians

- Ian Ritchie – programming, saxophone

Production

- Ian Ritchie – producer (tracks 1–3, 6–7, 9–11, 13)
- Chris Sheldon – engineer (tracks 1–3, 6–7, 9–11, 13)
- Paul Hardiman – producer (track 4)
- Glyn Johns – producer (tracks 5, 12)
- The Big Dish – producers (track 8)

Other

- Gary Wathen – art direction
- Red Ranch – design
- Heather Angel – photography

== Charts ==
Chart (1986)	Peak position
UK Albums Chart	85
