= El Chaqueño =

El Chaqueño is a newspaper published in Tarija, Bolivia.
