= El Mundo (Texas) =

Spanish-language newspaper headquartered in Texas

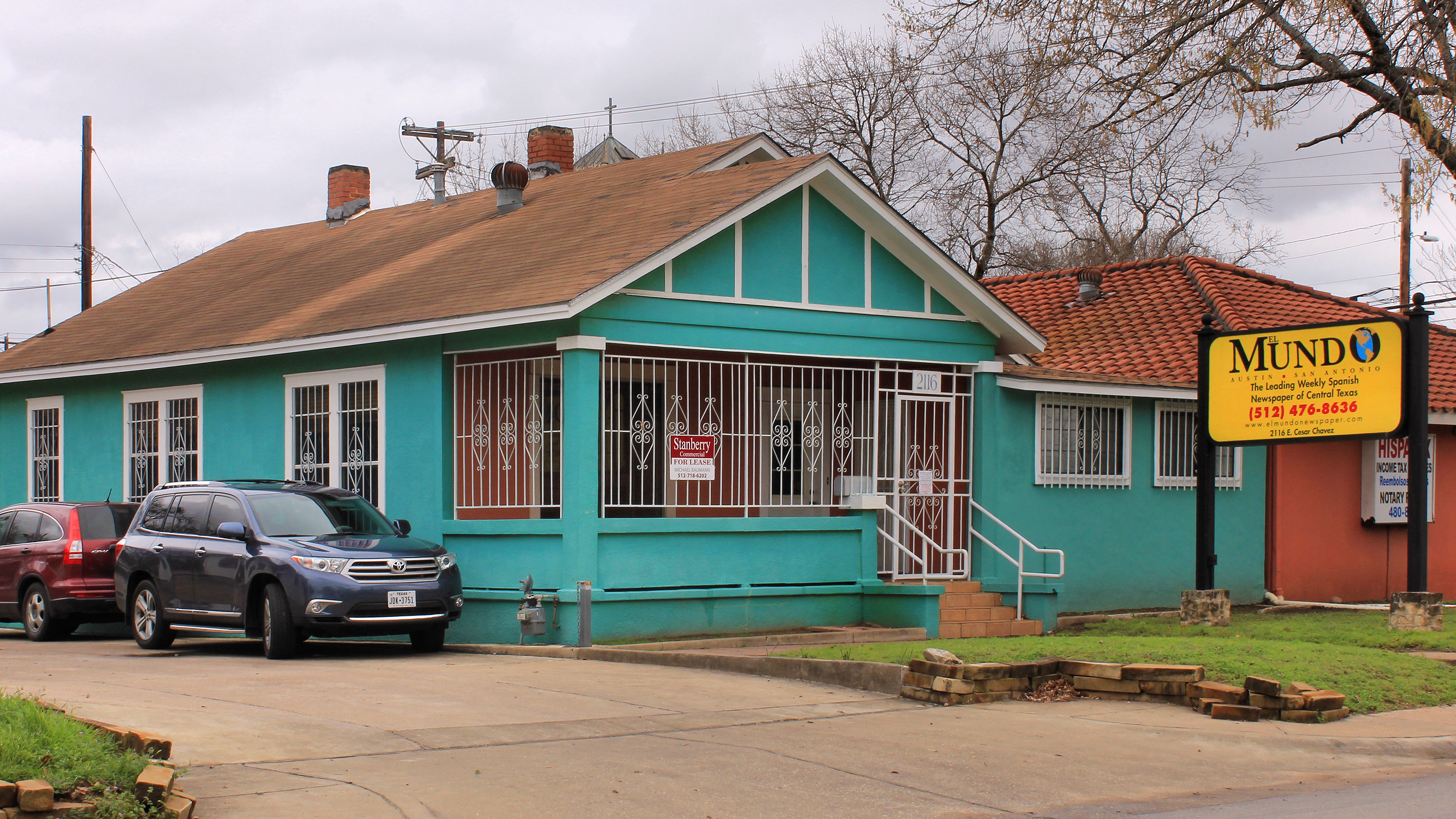
El Mundo former headquarters

El Mundo Newspaper is a Spanish-language newspaper distributed in Austin and San Antonio, Texas, US. It is headquartered in Austin.

It began publication in 1990. It began serving other parts of the Central Texas region circa 2000 and its San Antonio services began in August 2004. It has a total circulation of 28,000.

It hosts a yearly "Back to School Fest" in Austin.
