= La Estrella del Oriente =

Newspaper published in Bolivia

La Estrella del Oriente is a newspaper published in Santa Cruz de la Sierra, Bolivia. It was founded in 1864 (the first issue was released on January 1) as the first newspaper published in the city, with Tristán Roca as its first director

In December 2014 it announced a special book series covering its 150-year history.
