= El Mundo (Santa Cruz) =

Newspaper in Santa Cruz de la Sierra, Bolivia

El Mundo is a newspaper published in Santa Cruz de la Sierra, in eastern Bolivia.
