= Heather Angel (photographer) =

British photographer (born 1941)

- Born: Heather Hazel Le Rougetel; 1941 (age 84–85)
- Education: Bristol University
- Known for: Nature photography
- Awards: Honorary Doctorate of Science; 1998 Louis Schmidt Laureate
- Website: heatherangelphotography.co.uk

Heather Hazel Angel MSc (née Le Rougetel, born 1941) is a British nature photographer, author and television presenter. She is also the owner and manager of a photographic agency which sells her pictures for use in print and on-line.

== Biography ==
Her father was an RAF officer. Her mother is the garden-history author Hazel le Rougetel.

She attended 14 schools in England and New Zealand, and then graduated in zoology from Bristol University, and, in 1964, married Martin Angel. She obtained her MSc in 1965. and developed a career as a nature photographer and author.

In 1982/1983 she presented the Yorkshire Television produced, Channel 4-screened television series "Making the Most of…", which encouraged people to enjoy the British countryside. She wrote Heather Angel's Countryside to accompany the series.

She was commissioned to photograph Charles, Prince of Wales and was a guest of the Prime Minister at 10 Downing Street, both in 1985.

She holds an Honorary Doctorate of Science from the University of Bath (1986), and has been Visiting Professor in the Department of Life Science at the University of Nottingham (since 1994). She was President of the Royal Photographic Society from 1984 to 1986, and was the founder Chair of their Nature Group. The BioCommunications Association of USA made her their 1998 Louis Schmidt Laureate. She is a Fellow of the British Institute of Professional Photography and of the Royal Photographic Society; and a vice-president of the Nature in Art Trust

Her exhibition Natural Visions toured the UK from 2000 to 2004 and was also on show in Kuala Lumpur, Cairo and Beijing.

== Books ==
- Nature Photography: Its art and Techniques Fountain Press (1972), ISBN 978-0-85242-670-8
- Seashore life on Sandy Beaches : A fully illustrated introduction to some of their animal and plant inhabitants. Text and photographs by Heather Angel, Jarrold and Sons, (1975), ISBN 0-85306-587-X
- Monsters of the deep : sharks, giant squid, whales and dolphins, (Longmeadow Press), (1976), ISBN 0-7064-0541-2
- Life in the oceans : the spectacular world of whales, dolphins, giant squids, sharks and other unusual sea creatures, (London), (1976), ISBN 0-7064-0541-2
- British wild orchids, Jarrold and Sons, (1977), ISBN 0-85306-713-9
- The water naturalist, New York, (1982), ISBN 0-87196-642-5
- Heather Angel's Countryside Michael Joseph, (1983). ISBN 0-7181-2284-4
- The book of close-up photography : text and photographs, Knopf, (1983), ISBN 0-394-53232-5
- A camera in the garden, Quiller, (1984), ISBN 0-907621-34-1
- Landscape photography, Oxford Illustrated Press, (1989), ISBN 0-946609-65-9
- A world of plants : treasures from the Royal Botanic Gardens, Kew, (Little, Brown), (1993), ISBN 978-0-8212-2040-5
- Photographing the natural world, New York, (1994), ISBN 0-8069-0714-2
- Pandas, Voyageur Press, (1998), ISBN 978-0-89658-364-1
- How to photograph flowers, (Mechanicsburg, PA), (1998), ISBN 0-8117-2455-7
- How to Photograph Water, (Mechanicsburg, PA), (1999), ISBN 0-8117-2461-1
- Exploring Natural China, Evans Mitchell Books (2010) ISBN 978-1-901268-41-6
- Pollination Power, University of Chicago Press (2016) ISBN 978-0-226366-91-3

=== Illustration ===
Additionally, her pictures are all or a significant proportion of those in:

- The Natural History of Britain and Ireland Michael Joseph, (1981). ISBN 1-85052-064-X

=== Papers ===
- ''Distribution pattern analysis in a marine benthic community. Helgolander wiss. Meeresuntes, 15, pp 445–454 (written with Martin Angel, based on her MSc thesis)
