= Ian Ritchie (producer) =

English composer and producer

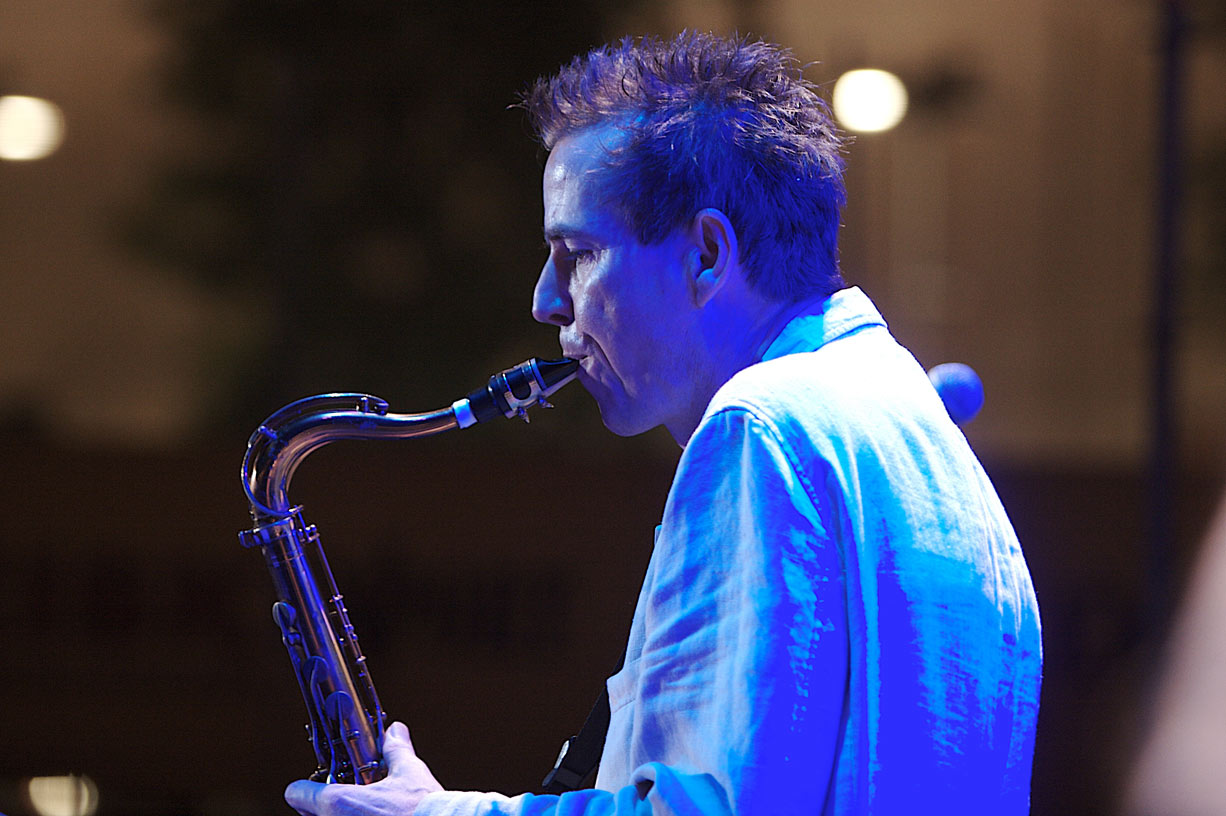
- Ritchie performing at the Malta Jazz Festival in Valletta, 2006

Background information
- Born: 1954 (age 71–72); Glasgow, Scotland
- Occupations: Composer; record producer; arranger; saxophonist
- Instruments: Saxophone; keyboards
- Years active: 1974–present
- Label: 33
- Member of: Deaf School
- Website: ian-ritchie.com

Ian Ritchie (born 1954) is a Scottish composer, record producer, arranger and saxophonist. He was the producer of Roger Waters' second solo studio album Radio K.A.O.S. (1987), along with other recordings with Laurie Anderson (Strange Angels), Pete Wylie (Sinful), Hugh Cornwell (Wolf) and the Big Dish (Swimmer). During the 1980s, he collaborated with English singer, songwriter and musician Gary Numan.

Ritchie is married to the jazz and cabaret performer, Holly Penfield.

Ritchie is also the composer of "The Globe Trekker Theme" (previously known as "The Lonely Planet Theme"), the theme music of the travel show Globe Trekker.

He is a member of the Liverpool-based theatre rock group Deaf School, and has released a number of singles in the 1980s under the name Miro Miroe. His saxophone playing can be heard on "See the Day" by Dee C Lee, "Club Tropicana" by Wham!, "C'est La Vie" by Robbie Nevil and on his debut jazz album Ian Ritchie's SOHO Project.

In 2006–2008, Ritchie toured as saxophonist with Roger Waters as part of the backing band on the Dark Side of the Moon Live tour. In 2010, he toured Europe with Australian progressive rock band Unitopia.

In 2013, Ritchie released South of Houston, a second jazz album under his own name. He has produced an album for the dance group URUBU and performs with them. Other groups Ritchie plays with include the Blue Jays ('50s rock & roll), the Cricklewood Cats (jazz/cabaret, together with Holly Penfield), Tina T's Smooth Soul (soul/R&B/house) and the Crown Moran Allstars (jazz), who also have an eponymous album written and produced by Ritchie.

In 2016, he took part in the historic Desert Trip concerts at Coachella. From 2017 to 2018, he again toured with Roger Waters' new lineup playing tenor saxophone. The Us + Them show was performed in 157 venues across the world.

== Discography ==
- Paradiso (1998)
- Ian Ritchie's SOHO Project (33 Jazz, 2007)
- The Chance Element with John Ashton Thomas (2009)
- The Harry Waters Band, Harry Waters 2009
- The Crown Moran Allstars (2011)
- South of Houston (2013)
- My Nine Lives (2024)

=== Other artists ===
- Radio K.A.O.S. - Roger Waters (1987) - Producer; also credited for "piano, keyboards, tenor saxophone, Fairlight programming, drum programming"
- Swimmer - The Big Dish (1986) - Producer; also credited for "piano, keyboards, tenor saxophone, Fairlight programming, drum programming"
- "Sinful!" - Pete Wylie (1986) - Producer; also credited for "piano, keyboards, Fairlight programming, drum programming"
- Wolf - Hugh Cornwell (1987) - Producer; also credited for "piano, keyboards, Fairlight programming, drum programming"
- Strange Angels - Laurie Anderson (1990) - Producer; also credited for "programming"
- Roger Waters: Us + Them (2019) - Performer; saxophone, bass
