= List of songs recorded by Ivy =

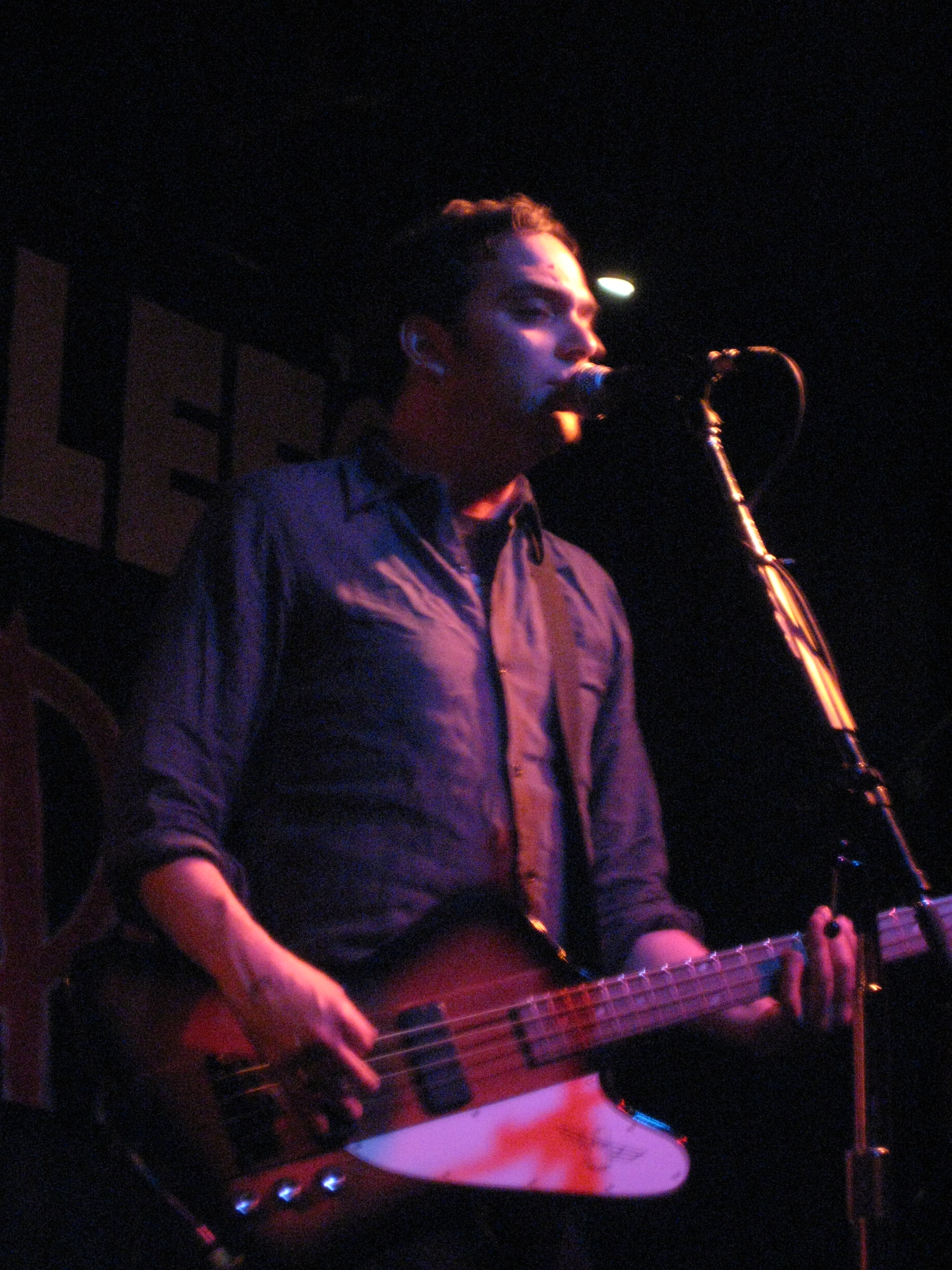
Ivy's Adam Schlesinger performing live in 2006

American band Ivy has recorded material for six studio albums, one extended play (EP), and for various compilation albums and soundtracks. Formed in 1994, the musical trio consists of Dominique Durand, Andy Chase, and Adam Schlesinger. After releasing the EP Lately with Seed Records in 1994, the band recorded their debut album, Realistic, which was released in 1995. A pop album, lead single "Get Enough" was named a "Single of the Week" by British newspaper Melody Maker. After a brief hiatus, the band released their second album, Apartment Life, in 1997 after signing with Atlantic Records. In order to make the pop-influenced album, the group collaborated with a number of high-profile musicians, including Chris Botti, Lloyd Cole, James Iha, and Dean Wareham. The album was, however, a commercial disappointment for their record label, who dropped Ivy while they were touring. Two songs from Apartment Life ("I Get the Message" and "This Is the Day") received further attention after being included on the official soundtrack to the 1998 film, There's Something About Mary. Ivy signed to Nettwerk to release Long Distance in 2000; the album incorporated music from multiple genres, such as guitar pop, trip hop, and new wave. The third single released, "Edge of the Ocean", became Ivy's first song to enter a musical record chart, peaking at number 160 in the United Kingdom. Due to its popularity, Ivy considers it to be their signature song.

Their fourth album, Guestroom, was released in 2002 by Minty Fresh Records, featuring cover songs from artists like the Blow Monkeys, the Ronettes, Serge Gainsbourg, and Steely Dan. The "minimal" production was accompanied by a variety of instruments, such as synths and acoustics. In the Clear (2005) is the group's fifth album and second with Nettwerk. Featuring elements of pop, disco, and rock music, it takes influence from early 1960s songs and was compared to material released by Pet Shop Boys and Blondie. Following a six-year hiatus and the birth of Durand and Chase's first child, the group returned with 2011's All Hours after Durand's fear that their extended absence would cause their fans to lose interest. Musically an electronic pop album, it was backed by the release of three commercial singles ("Distant Lights", "Fascinated", and "Lost in the Sun"). Unlike their previously released albums, Durand did not receive any writing credits on All Hours, but the entire record was still written and produced by Chase and Schlesinger. The trio has writing credits on several other albums. They recorded covers of Joe Raposo's "Sing" for the 2002 children's album For the Kids and Vince Guaraldi's "Christmas Time Is Here" for Nettwerk's holiday album Maybe This Christmas Tree (2004). Producer Peter Nashel also had Ivy record "I'll Be Near You" for the soundtrack to the 2005 film Bee Season.

== Songs ==
All songs recorded by Ivy, except where noted.

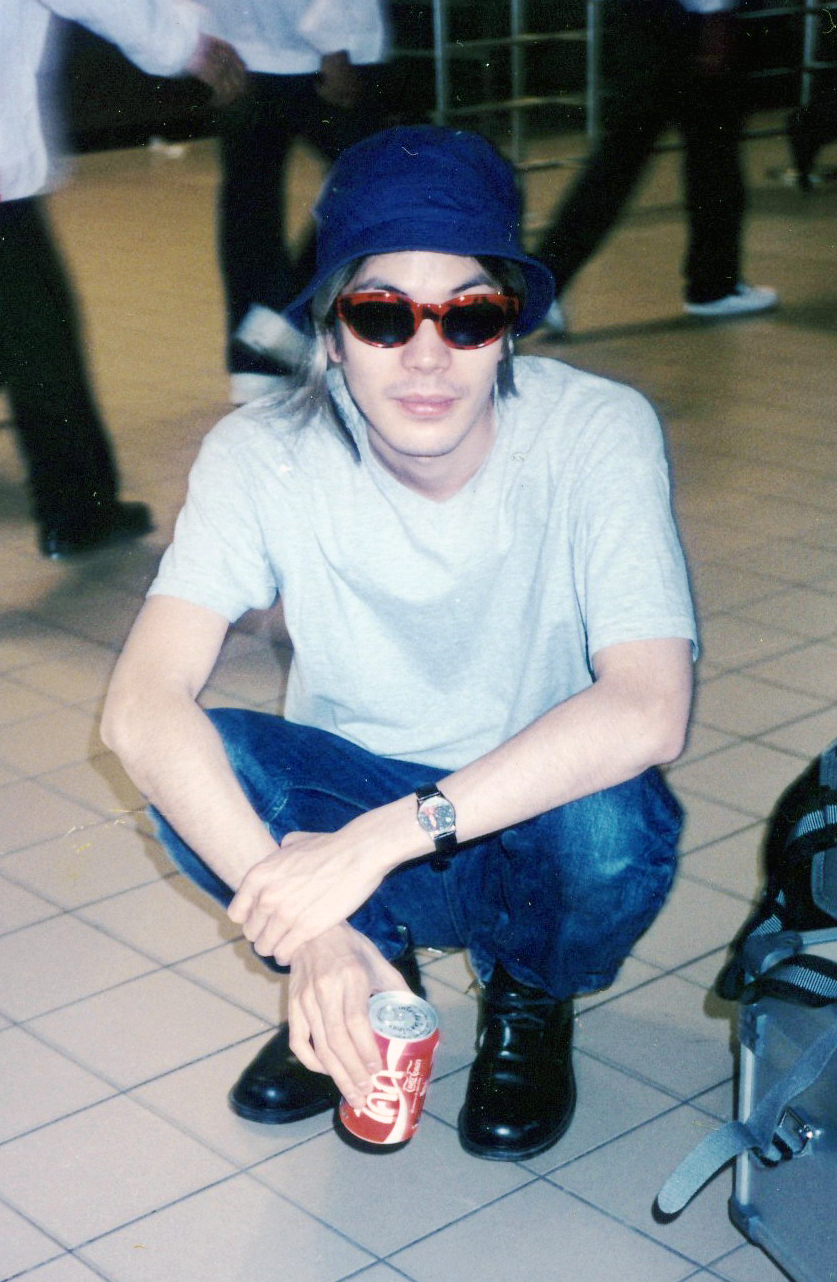
"Back in Our Town" was written by Ivy and The Smashing Pumpkins' member James Iha.

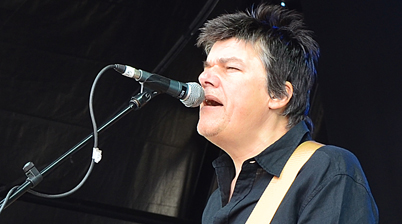
"Digging Your Scene", a song written by Dr. Robert, has been recorded by Ivy on multiple occasions.

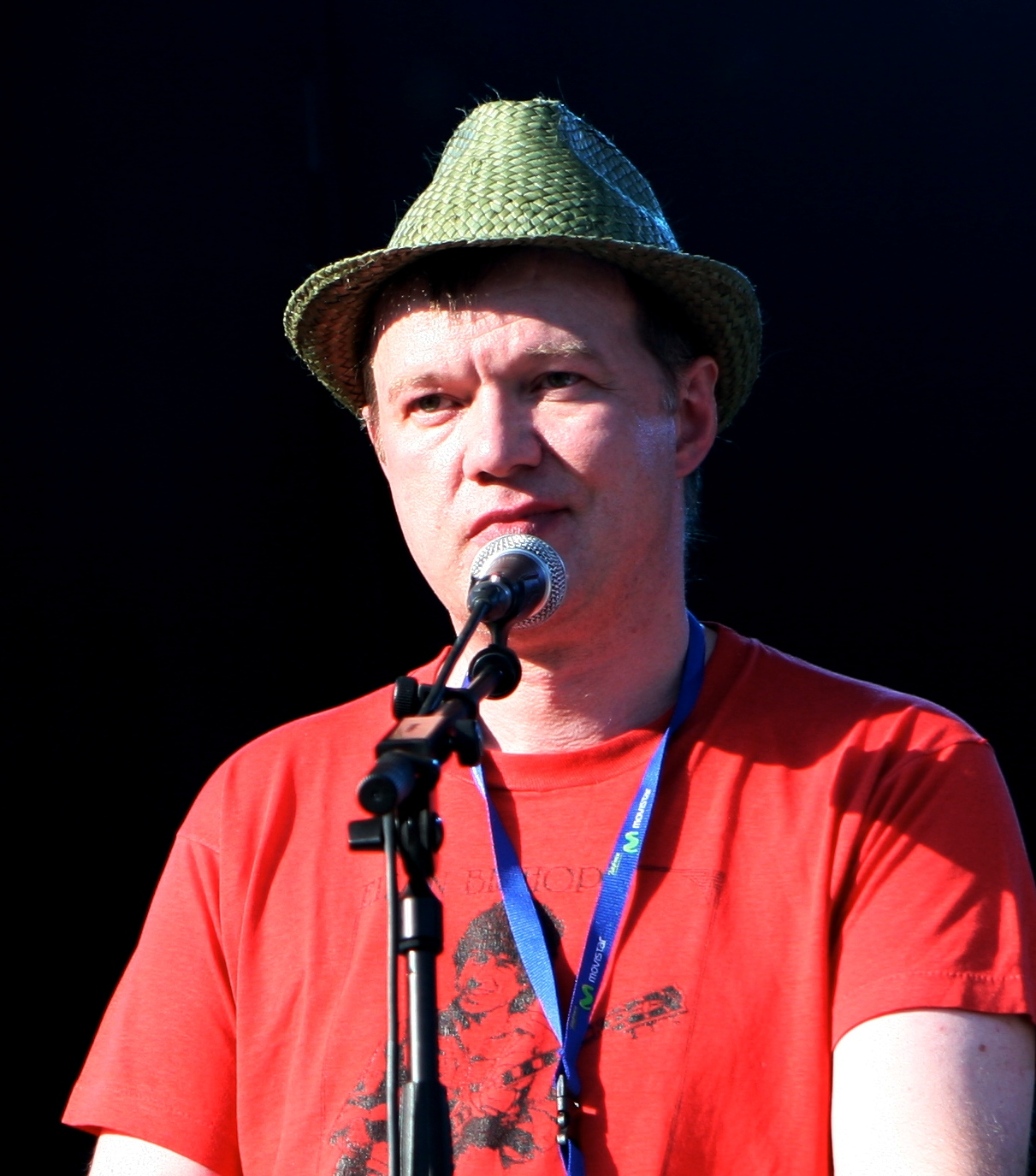
Edwyn Collins, lead singer of Orange Juice, wrote "I Guess I'm Just a Little Too Sensitive", which was covered by Ivy in 1994 for their 1994 EP Lately.

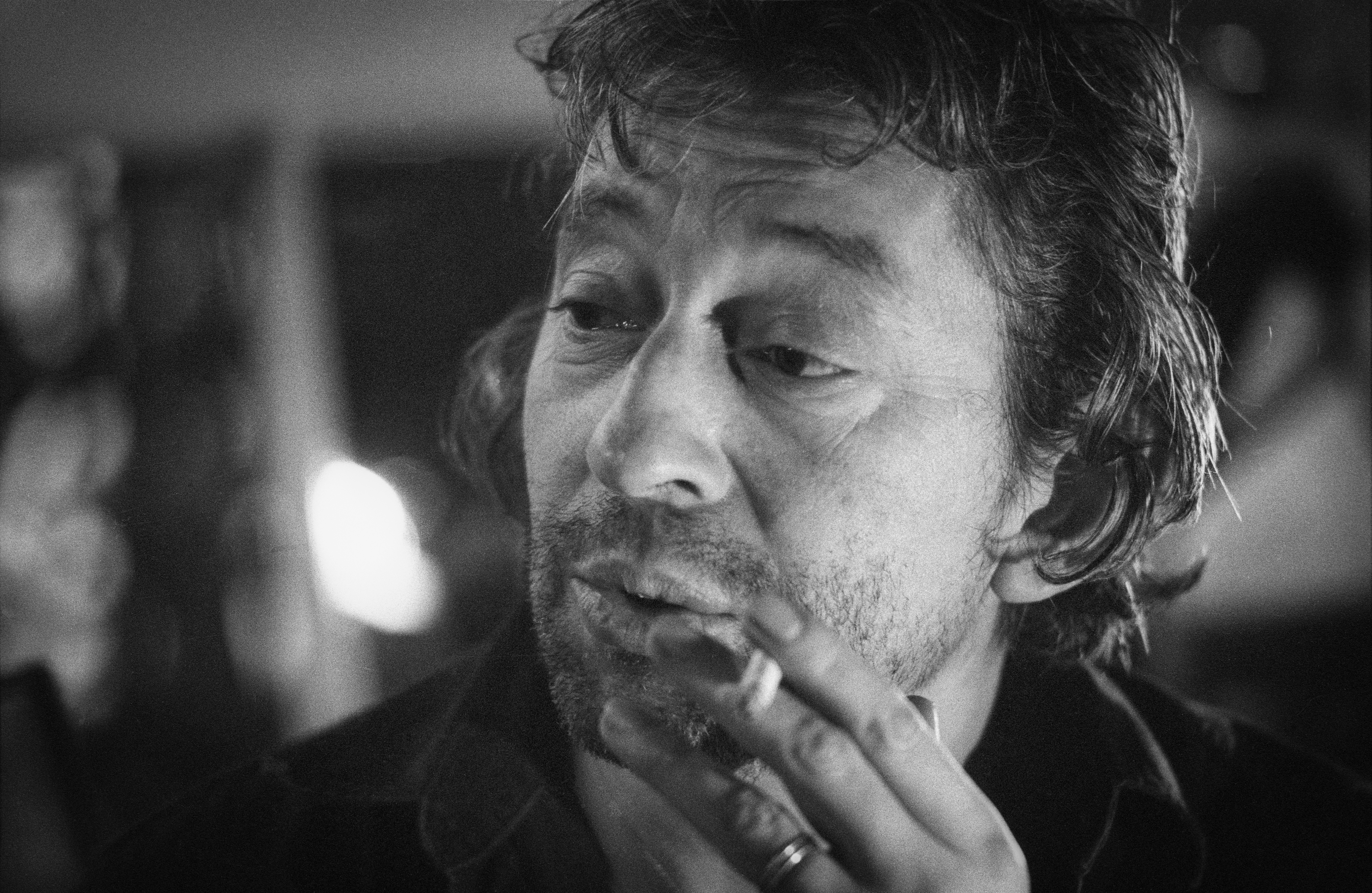
The group recorded a cover of Serge Gainsbourg's "L'Anamour" for Guestroom in 2002.

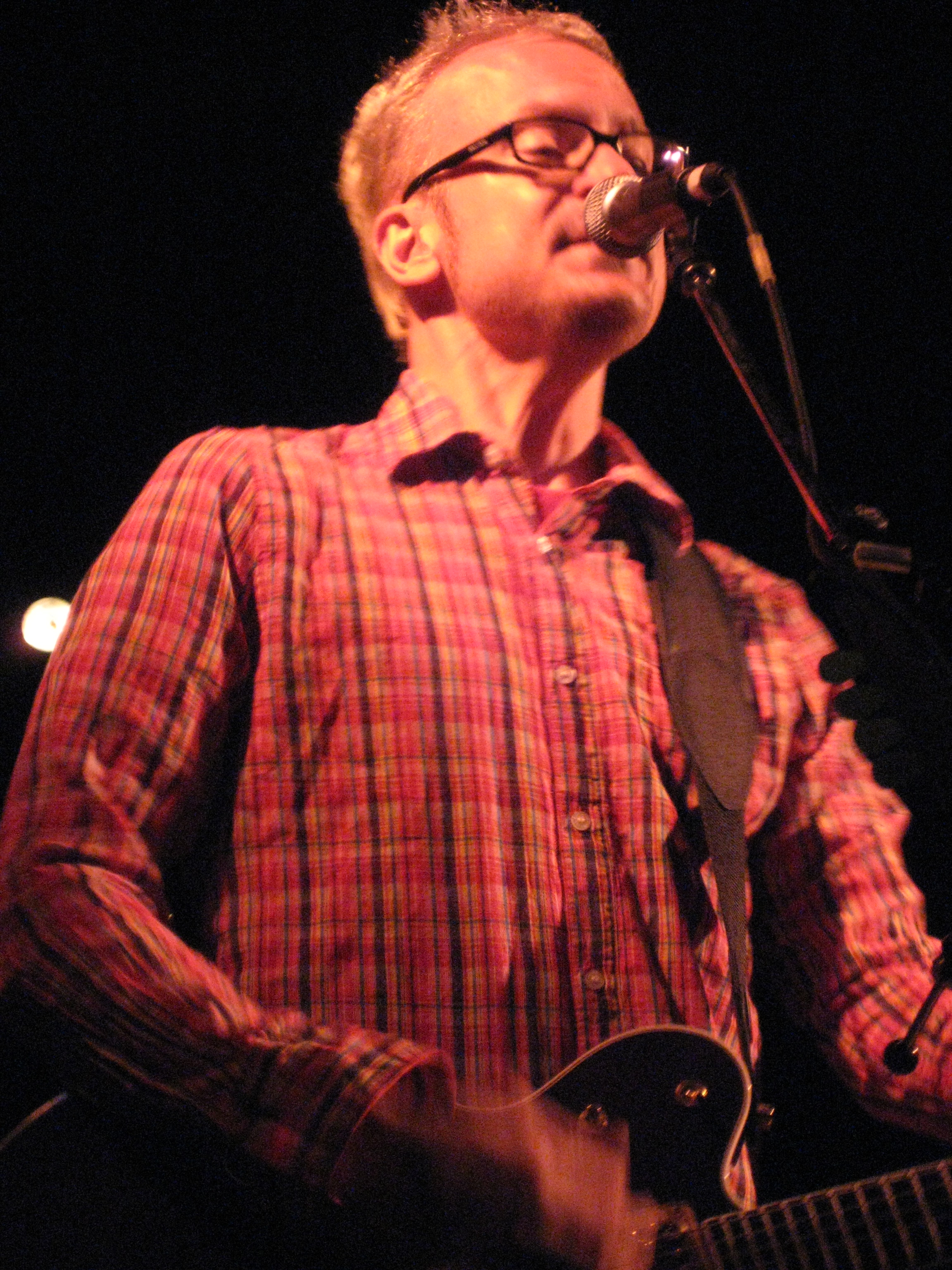
Chris Collingwood served as a co-writer to Ivy's 1999 single "You Don't Know Anything".

Name of song, featured performers, writers, originating album, and year released
Song	Writer(s)	Album	Year	Ref(s).
"15 Seconds"	Dominique Durand; Andy Chase; Adam Schlesinger	Realistic	1995	
"All I Ever Wanted"	Dominique Durand; Andy Chase; Adam Schlesinger	Long Distance	2024	
"Ba Ba Ba"	Dominique Durand; Andy Chase; Adam Schlesinger	Apartment Life	1997	
"Back in Our Town"	Dominique Durand; Andy Chase; Adam Schlesinger; James Iha	Apartment Life	1997	
"Baker"	Dominique Durand; Andy Chase; Adam Schlesinger	Apartment Life	1997	
"Be My Baby"	Jeff Barry; Ellie Greenwich; Phil Spector	Guestroom	2002	
"Beautiful"	Dominique Durand; Andy Chase; Adam Schlesinger	Realistic	1995	
"The Best Thing"	Dominique Durand; Andy Chase; Adam Schlesinger	Apartment Life	1997	
"Blame It on Yourself"	Dominique Durand; Andy Chase; Adam Schlesinger	Long Distance	2000	
"By Myself"	Dominique Durand; Andy Chase; Adam Schlesinger	"Don't Believe a Word" single	1995	
"Can't Even Fake It"	Dominique Durand; Andy Chase; Adam Schlesinger	Lately	1994	
"Christmas Time Is Here"	Lee Mendelson; Vince Guaraldi	Maybe This Christmas Tree	2004	
"Clear My Head"	Dominique Durand; Andy Chase; Adam Schlesinger	In the Clear	2005	
"The Conversation"	Andy Chase; Adam Schlesinger	All Hours	2011	
"Corners of Your Mind"	Dominique Durand; Andy Chase; Adam Schlesinger	In the Clear	2005	
"Cruel"	Paddy McAloon	Guestroom	2002	
"Decay"	Dominique Durand; Andy Chase; Adam Schlesinger	Realistic	1995	
"Digging Your Scene"	Dr. Robert	Long Distance	2000	
"Disappointed"	Dominique Durand; Andy Chase; Adam Schlesinger	Long Distance	2000	
"Distant Lights"	Andy Chase; Adam Schlesinger	All Hours	2011	
"Don't Believe a Word"	Dominique Durand; Andy Chase; Adam Schlesinger	Realistic	1995	
"Drag You Down"	Dominique Durand; Andy Chase; Adam Schlesinger	"Get Enough" single	1994	
"Dying Star"	Dominique Durand; Andy Chase; Adam Schlesinger	Realistic	1995	
"Edge of the Ocean"	Dominique Durand; Andy Chase; Adam Schlesinger	Long Distance	2000	
"Everybody Knows"	Andy Chase; Adam Schlesinger	All Hours	2011	
"Everyday"	Dominique Durand; Andy Chase; Adam Schlesinger	Realistic	1995	
"Fascinated"	Andy Chase; Adam Schlesinger	All Hours	2011	
"Feel So Free" (Ivy featuring Scott McCloud)	Dominique Durand; Andy Chase; Adam Schlesinger	In the Clear	2005	
"Four in the Morning"	Dominique Durand; Andy Chase; Adam Schlesinger	In the Clear	2005	
"Get Enough"	Dominique Durand; Andy Chase; Adam Schlesinger	Realistic	1995	
"Get Out of the City"	Dominique Durand; Andy Chase; Adam Schlesinger	Apartment Life	1997	
"Hideaway"	Dominique Durand; Andy Chase; Adam Schlesinger	Long Distance	2000	
"How's Never"	Andy Chase; Adam Schlesinger	All Hours	2011	
"I Don't Know Why I Love You"	Guy Chadwick	Guestroom	2002	
"I Get the Message"	Dominique Durand; Andy Chase; Adam Schlesinger	Apartment Life	1997	
"I Guess I'm Just a Little Too Sensitive"	Edwyn Collins	Lately	1994	
"I Hate December"	Dominique Durand; Andy Chase; Adam Schlesinger	Lately	1994	
"I Know My Way"	Dominique Durand; Andy Chase; Adam Schlesinger	In the Clear	2005	
"I Still Want You"	Andy Chase; Adam Schlesinger	All Hours	2011	
"I Think of You"	Dominique Durand; Andy Chase; Adam Schlesinger	Long Distance	2000	
"I'll Be Near You"	Dominique Durand; Andy Chase; Adam Schlesinger	Bee Season: Original Motion; Picture Soundtrack	2005	
"I've Got a Feeling"	Dominique Durand; Andy Chase; Adam Schlesinger	Apartment Life	1997	
"I've Got You Memorized"	Dominique Durand; Andy Chase; Adam Schlesinger	In the Clear	2005	
"In the Shadows"	Dominique Durand; Andy Chase; Adam Schlesinger	Realistic	1995	
"It's All in Your Mind"	Dominique Durand; Andy Chase; Adam Schlesinger	Long Distance	2000	
"Keep Moving"	Dominique Durand; Andy Chase; Adam Schlesinger	In the Clear	2005	
"Kite"	Nick Heyward	Guestroom	2002	
"L'Anamour"	Serge Gainsbourg	Guestroom	2002	
"Let's Go to Bed"	Laurence Tolhurst; Robert Smith	Guestroom	2002	
"Let's Stay Inside"	Dominique Durand; Andy Chase; Adam Schlesinger	Long Distance	2000	
"Lost in the Sun"	Andy Chase; Adam Schlesinger	All Hours	2011	
"Lucy Doesn't Love You"	Dominique Durand; Andy Chase; Adam Schlesinger	Long Distance	2000	
"Make It So Hard"	Andy Chase; Adam Schlesinger	All Hours	2011	
"Midnight Sun"	Dominique Durand; Andy Chase; Adam Schlesinger	Long Distance	2000	
"Never Do That Again"	Dominique Durand; Andy Chase; Adam Schlesinger	Apartment Life	1997	
"No Guarantee"	Dominique Durand; Andy Chase; Adam Schlesinger	Realistic	1995	
"Nothing but the Sky"	Dominique Durand; Andy Chase; Adam Schlesinger	In the Clear	2005	
"Ocean City Girl"	Dominique Durand; Andy Chase; Adam Schlesinger	In the Clear	2005	
"One More Last Kiss"	Dominique Durand; Andy Chase; Adam Schlesinger	Long Distance	2000	
"Only a Fool Would Say That"	Donald Fagen; Walter Becker	Guestroom	2002	
"An Ordinary"	Dominique Durand; Andy Chase; Adam Schlesinger	"Don't Believe a Word" single	1995	
"Over"	Dominique Durand; Andy Chase; Adam Schlesinger	Realistic	1995	
"Point of View"	Dominique Durand; Andy Chase; Adam Schlesinger	Realistic	1995	
"Quick, Painless and Easy"	Dominique Durand; Andy Chase; Adam Schlesinger	Apartment Life	1997	
"Say Goodbye"	Shivika Asthana; Keith Gendel; Tony Goddess	Guestroom	2002	
"She Really Got to You"	Andy Chase; Adam Schlesinger	All Hours	2011	
"Sing"	Joe Raposo	For the Kids	2002	
"Sleeping Late"	Dominique Durand; Andy Chase; Adam Schlesinger	Apartment Life	1997	
"Streets of Your Town"	Robert Forster; Grant McLennan	Guestroom	2002	
"Suspicious"	Andy Chase; Adam Schlesinger	All Hours	2011	
"Sweet Mary"	Dominique Durand; Andy Chase; Adam Schlesinger	Apartment Life	1997	
"Tess Don't Tell"	Dominique Durand; Andy Chase; Adam Schlesinger	In the Clear	2005	
"These Are the Things About You"	Dominique Durand; Andy Chase; Adam Schlesinger	Apartment Life	1997	
"Thinking About You"	Dominique Durand; Andy Chase; Adam Schlesinger	In the Clear	2005	
"This Is the Day"	Dominique Durand; Andy Chase; Adam Schlesinger	Apartment Life	1997	
"Twisting"	Dominique Durand; Andy Chase; Adam Schlesinger	Lately	1994	
"Undertow"	Dominique Durand; Andy Chase; Adam Schlesinger	Long Distance	2000	
"We Try"	Andy Chase; Adam Schlesinger	"Lost in the Sun" single	2012	
"While We're in Love"	Dominique Durand; Andy Chase; Adam Schlesinger	Long Distance	2000	
"Wish It All Away"	Dominique Durand; Andy Chase; Adam Schlesinger	Lately	1994	
"World Without You"	Andy Chase; Adam Schlesinger	All Hours	2011	
"Worry About You"	Dominique Durand; Andy Chase; Adam Schlesinger	Long Distance	2000	
"You Don't Know Anything"	Dominique Durand; Andy Chase; Adam Schlesinger; Chris Collingwood	Apartment Life	1997	
