= Ivy discography =

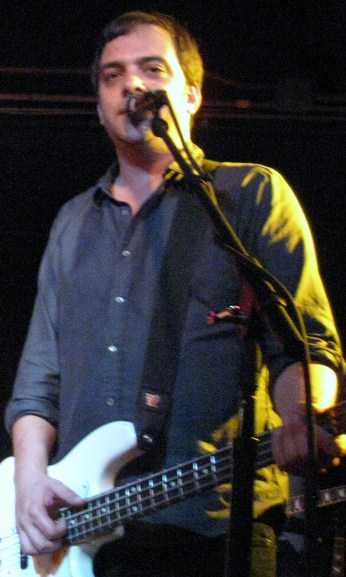
- Ivy's Adam Schlesinger performing live in 2006
- Studio albums: 7
- EPs: 1
- Compilation albums: 2
- Singles: 19
- Music videos: 14
- Promotional singles: 4
- Guest appearances: 4

American band Ivy has released seven studio albums, two compilation albums, one extended play (EP), nineteen singles, four promotional singles, and fourteen music videos. After signing to Seed Records, Ivy released their debut EP, Lately, in May 1994. Their debut studio album Realistic was released in February 1995 and produced the singles "Get Enough" and "Don't Believe a Word", along with "Beautiful", which was issued as a promotional single. In 1995, a music video for "I Hate December", a song from Lately, was filmed and released. The song was then distributed as a single in January 1996. Ivy eventually left Seed and signed to Atlantic Records to record their second album Apartment Life, released in October 1997. To promote the album, "The Best Thing", "I've Got a Feeling", "This Is the Day", and "You Don't Know Anything" were made available as singles. Their third album Long Distance was released in Japan in 2000, and the next year in the United States. Three singles were promoted, including "Edge of the Ocean" which peaked at number 160 on the UK Singles Chart, marking their only appearance on that chart.

In September 2002, Ivy released Guestroom, their fourth studio album, which consisted of ten cover songs. It contained lead single "Digging Your Scene", which was previously included on Long Distance in 2000. They recorded covers of "Sing" and "Christmas Time Is Here" for the 2002 charity record For the Kids and 2004 compilation album Maybe This Christmas Tree, respectively. In the Clear was released as their fifth studio album in March 2005 and spawned the single "Thinking About You". They also lent the song "I'll Be Near You" to the soundtrack for the 2005 American film Bee Season. Ivy's sixth album, All Hours, was distributed in September 2011 by Nettwerk. It featured the singles "Distant Lights", "Fascinated" and "Lost in the Sun", all released during 2011 and 2012. All Hours peaked at number 12 on the Dance/Electronic Albums chart and number 25 on the Heatseekers Albums chart in the United States.

In 2023, Ivy returned with their greatest hits album The Best of Ivy through Bar None Records. The following year, "All I Ever Wanted", an Apartment Life demo, was released as a single for the 25th anniversary reissue of Long Distance, their first new project following founding member Adam Schlesinger's death in 2020. Andy Chase and Dominique Durand also announced plans to release a seventh Ivy album composed of earlier demos, titled Traces of You, which was released in September 2025.

== Studio albums ==
Title	Album details	Peak chart positions	
Title	Album details	US Dance	US Heat
Realistic	Released: February 14, 1995; Label: Seed; Format: Cassette · CD · digital download · LP · streaming	—	—
Apartment Life	Released: October 7, 1997; Label: Atlantic; Format: Cassette · CD · digital download · LP · streaming	—	—
Long Distance	Released: November 8, 2000; Label: Nettwerk · EastWest; Format: CD · digital download · LP · streaming	—	—
Guestroom	Released: September 10, 2002; Label: Minty Fresh · Unfiltered; Format: Cassette · CD · digital download · LP · streaming	—	—
In the Clear	Released: March 1, 2005; Label: Nettwerk; Format: CD · digital download · streaming	—	—
All Hours	Released: September 20, 2011; Label: Nettwerk; Format: CD · digital download · streaming	12	25
Traces of You	Released: September 5, 2025; Label: Bar None; Format: CD · digital download · LP · streaming	—	—
"—" denotes a title that did not chart, or was not released in that territory.

== Compilation albums ==
Title	Album details
The Best of Ivy	Released: February 14, 2023; Label: Bar None; Format: Digital download · LP · streaming
Apartment Life Demos	Released: April 22, 2023; Label: Bar None; Format: Digital download · LP · streaming

== Extended plays ==
Title	EP details
Lately	Released: May 1994; Label: Seed; Format: CD · digital download · LP · streaming

== Singles ==
=== As lead artist ===
List of singles as lead artist, with selected chart positions, showing year released and album name
Title	Year	Peak chart positions		Album
Title	Year	SCO	UK	Album
"Get Enough"	1994	—	—	Realistic
"Don't Believe a Word"	1995	—	—	Realistic
"I Hate December"	1996	—	—	Lately
"The Best Thing"	1997	—	—	Apartment Life
"I've Got a Feeling"	1997	—	—	Apartment Life
"This Is the Day"	1998	—	—	Apartment Life
"You Don't Know Anything"	1999	—	—	Apartment Life
"Lucy Doesn't Love You"	2000	—	—	Long Distance
"Disappointed"	2001	—	—	Long Distance
"Edge of the Ocean"	2001	86	160	Long Distance
"Digging Your Scene"	2002	—	—	Guestroom
"Thinking About You"	2005	—	—	In the Clear
"Distant Lights"	2011	—	—	All Hours
"Fascinated"	2011	—	—	All Hours
"Lost in the Sun"	2012	—	—	All Hours
"All I Ever Wanted"	2024	—	—	Long Distance
"Say You Will"	2025	—	—	Traces of You
"Fragile People"	2025	—	—	Traces of You
"Heartbreak"	2025	—	—	Traces of You
"—" denotes a title that did not chart, or was not released in that territory.

=== Promotional singles ===
List of promotional singles, showing year released and album name
Title	Year	Album
"Beautiful"	1995	Realistic
"I've Got a Feeling" (demo)	2023	Apartment Life Demos
"Wasting Time" (acoustic)	2026	Non-album singles
"Mystery Girl" (acoustic)	2026	Non-album singles

== Guest appearances ==
List of non-single guest appearances, showing year released and album name
title	Year	Album
"Be My Baby"	1997	I Can Hear Music: The Songs of Ellie Greenwich & Jeff Barry
"Sing"	2002	For the Kids
"Christmas Time Is Here"	2004	Maybe This Christmas Tree
"I'll Be Near You"	2005	Bee Season: Original Motion Picture Soundtrack

== Music videos ==
List of music videos, with directors, showing year released
Title	Year	Director(s)
"I Hate December"	1995	Doug Werby
"I've Got a Feeling"	1997	Toby Tremlett
"Lucy Doesn't Love You"	2000	Adam Schlesinger
"Edge of the Ocean"	2001	Adam Schlesinger
"Let's Go to Bed"	2003	Stefano Giovannini
"Thinking About You"	2005	Unknown
"Fascinated"	2011	Adam Neustadter
"Lost in the Sun"	2012	Unknown
"Suspicious"	2017	David Dutton
"Say You Will"	2025	Bruce Driscoll
"Fragile People"	2025	Bruce Driscoll
"Heartbreak"	2025	Bruce Driscoll
"Mystery Girl"	2025	Bruce Driscoll
"The Great Unknown"	2025	Doug Werby
