= Beautiful (Ivy song) =

Promotional single by Ivy

from the album Realistic
- Released: 1995
- Recorded: 1994
- Studio: Zabriskie Point, New York City
- Length: 2:32
- Label: Seed
- Songwriters: Andy Chase; Adam Schlesinger
- Producers: Andy Chase; Kurt Ralske; Adam Schlesinger

"Beautiful" is a song by American band Ivy from their debut studio album Realistic (1995). A remixed version of the song was issued as a promotional single and distributed as a CD single in 1995 by Seed Records. It features an acoustic version of the trio's single "Don't Believe a Word" as a bonus track.

The track was written by Adam Schlesinger and Andy Chase, while production was handled by them in addition to Kurt Ralske. Critically, "Beautiful" was regarded as one of the best tracks on Realistic.

== Background and composition ==
In 1994, Ivy formed in New York City following a meeting between Andy Chase and French-native Dominique Durand. After acquiring musician Adam Schlesinger, they recorded several songs which would later appear on their first extended play (EP), Lately (1994). They also recorded the track "Get Enough", which became their debut single and also appeared on their first album. "Beautiful" is taken from Realistic, the trio's debut album which was released through Seed Records in 1995. The track was written and produced by Schlesinger and Chase, while production was handled by them in addition to Kurt Ralske. It was recorded in 1994 during sessions for Realistic held at Zabriskie Point recording studios in New York City.

The official remixed version of "Beautiful" was released as a promotional single by Seed Records sometime in 1995. Previously an unreleased version of the song, the remix was distributed on CD singles along with an acoustic version of the album's second single, "Don't Believe a Word". At the time of its release, the "Beautiful" single was distributed during outings for Ivy's national tour to promote Realistic. During the concerts, they toured with several musicians, including Lloyd Cole and Edwyn Collins.

== Critical reception ==
In a retrospective review of Ivy's back catalog, a staff member at the Ectophiles' Guide recommended the song to its readers as one of the best on Realistic, and listed album tracks "Decay" and "Shallow" as two others.

== Track listing ==
Promotional CD single
No.	Title	Length
1.	"Beautiful (Remix)"	2:27
2.	"Don't Believe a Word" (acoustic version)	2:56
