= Bernthal =

Bernthal is a surname. Notable people with the surname include:

- Bernie Bernthal (born 1960), American retired soccer player
- Frederick M. Bernthal (born 1943), United States Assistant Secretary of State for Oceans and International Environmental and Scientific Affairs from 1988 to 1990
- Jon Bernthal (born 1976), American actor
- Kirsten Bernthal Booth (born 1974), American volleyball coach
- Murray Bernthal (1911–2010), American musician and producer
- Tom Bernthal, American marketing CEO
