= I Hate December =

Single by American band Ivy

- "I Hate December (Remix)" cover

Single by Ivy

from the EP Lately
- Released: January 12, 1996
- Recorded: 1994
- Studio: The Place (New York City); Studio I'Hôpital Éphémère (Paris)
- Genre: French pop; Christmas
- Length: 2:34
- Label: Scratchie
- Songwriters: Dominique Durand; Andy Chase; Adam Schlesinger
- Producers: Andy Chase; Adam Schlesinger; Peter Nashel

Ivy singles chronology
"Don't Believe a Word" (1995)	"I Hate December" (1996)	"The Best Thing" (1997)

"I Hate December" (stylized as "i hate december") is a song by American band Ivy, released on January 12, 1996 by Scratchie Records. The track came from the band's first extended play, Lately (1994). It was written and produced by Andy Chase and Adam Schlesinger, while Dominique Durand also contributed to the lyrics and Peter Nashel handled additional production. While the version that appeared on Lately was not released as a commercial single, a remix was created and distributed as a CD single instead.

I Hate December has a darker theme compared to most holiday songs, with Durand singing about her dreams and fears of death. MTV host Matt Pinfield even compared to the 1982 Fear single "Fuck Christmas". "I Hate December" received praise for its songwriting and uniqueness. A music video directed and produced by Doug Werby was filmed and released in 1995. The video, which shows Ivy performing in a restaurant, received regular rotation on MTV2's music program 120 Minutes in 1996.

== Background and composition ==
"I Hate December" was initially included on Ivy's debut extended play, Lately (1994), which was released by Seed Records. The composition was written by Dominique Durand, Andy Chase, and Adam Schlesinger, with the latter two and Peter Nashel tackling its production. The single was recorded in 1994 during sessions at The Place in New York City and Studio I'Hôpital Éphémère in Paris. Ted Jensen handled the mastering of "I Hate December" (and the rest of the material on Lately) at Sterling Sound Studios in New York City.

After Ivy ended their partnership with Seed and signed with Scratchie Records in late 1995, a remix of the single was created and released as a CD single on January 12, 1996. The physical single contained the remix, an extended remix and the album version of "I Hate December"; it was issued in both the United States and the United Kingdom, and in the latter country, it was simultaneously released by Mercury Records in a limited edition jewel box set.

In general, "I Hate December" has a darker theme that is rarely heard in Christmas music. Durand talks about her fears of death, singing: "All I know is what I dream / But lately dreams have been such scary things / Of suicide and frozen ice over my pale body". Trouser Press editor Ira A. Robbins joked that with Lately, Ivy was attempting to bring French pop music back into the American music industry. In his book The Trouser Press Guide to '90s Rock, Robbins and Vickie Gilmer summarized it as an "original [...] wah-wahing" song recorded in the "City of Lights". On an episode of the MTV2 music program 120 Minutes, Schlesinger described the message behind "I Hate December" as "anti-Christian". In response, host Matt Pinfield compared the lyrics and inspiration behind "I Hate December" to "that Fear single [released] years ago" (referring to that band's 1982 single "Fuck Christmas").

== Critical reception ==
Nitsuh Abebe from AllMusic positively reviewed the track (and Lately), claiming that "I Hate December" and the four other tracks allow "their dreamier elements [to] come straight from the group's songwriting"; he also liked the production, describing it as "delicate" and "gentle". Indi from Canadian Atheist remarked that the single is "lovely" and applauded Ivy for disobeying the rules of a traditional holiday song. Longtime friend and collaborator D'arcy Wretzky labeled the track as her "favorite Ivy song".

== Music video ==
The official music video for "I Hate December" was directed and produced by Doug Werby sometime in 1995. The black and white video opens with Ivy performing live at a restaurant, continuing until the bridge of the song, when blurry close-ups of the band members are shown. On the November 17, 1996 episode of 120 Minutes, the official music video for "I Hate December" was played for promotional purposes, in addition to the music videos for Catherine's 1997 single "Four Leaf Clover" and Fountains of Wayne's 1996 single "Radiation Vibe".

== Track listing ==
CD single
No.	Title	Length
1.	"I Hate December" (remix)	2:40
2.	"I Hate December" (extended remix)	4:39
3.	"I Hate December" (original version)	2:34

== Personnel ==
Credits adapted from the liner notes of the "I Hate December" CD single.

- Andy Chase – lyrics, production
- Bill Chesley – editing
- Dominique Durand – lead and background vocals, lyrics
- Peter Nashel – editing, production
- Adam Schlesinger – lyrics, production
- Jean-Pierre Sluys – recording

== Release history ==
Region	Date	Format	Label
United States	January 12, 1996	CD	Scratchie
United Kingdom	January 12, 1996	CD	Mercury
