= All I Ever Wanted (Ivy song) =

2024 single by Ivy

Single by Ivy

from the album Long Distance
- Released: September 4, 2024
- Recorded: 1997
- Genre: Indie pop
- Length: 2:28
- Label: Bar None
- Songwriters: Andy Chase; Dominique Durand; Adam Schlesinger
- Producer: Lloyd Cole

Ivy singles chronology
| "Lost in the Sun" (2012) | "All I Ever Wanted" (2024) | "Say You Will" (2025) |

"All I Ever Wanted" is a song by the American band Ivy featured on the 25th anniversary edition of their third studio album, Long Distance (2000). Lead singer Dominique Durand wrote the song with band members Adam Schlesinger and Andy Chase, and Lloyd Cole produced it. Originally a demo for their second album, Apartment Life (1997), Chase and Durand rediscovered the track nearly two decades letter and decided to digitalize it. "All I Ever Wanted" was then released as a single in September 2024 by Bar None Records, their first new release in over a decade.

The indie pop song features Cole on guitar, and maintains Schlesinger's original musical contributions. It received generally positive reviews from critics, and appears on the vinyl reissues of Long Distance.

== Background and release ==
According to Andy Chase, Ivy had worked with producer Lloyd Cole on two tracks for their album Apartment Life in 1997. One of the collaborations, "I've Got a Feeling", was ultimately released while the other recording was scrapped. Decades later in 2021, he and Durand located an early demo for "All I Ever Wanted" on a 2" reel tape in a box labelled "Stupid Cat" in their archives; however, after finding the song familiar and using Shazam to identify it, they realized they never formally released it. He continued: "[...] for reasons lost on us today, we shelved ['All I Ever Wanted'] – never even doing a rough mix of it. So the master tape sat in our storage locker for the next 24 years, fully forgotten from our memories. After its reemergence, we had it transferred to digital and I finally was able to do a proper mix of it in my studio in 2024."

During the process of exploring their archives, they estimated discovering over 20 unfinished songs that had been born out of sessions with original Ivy member Adam Schlesinger, who died in April 2020 due to complications from COVID-19. The band was sensitive in recording without Schlesinger, with Dominique Durand noting "we always had in mind – 'do you think [Schlesinger] would be okay with that'? 'Do you think we're going too much in the direction that he wouldn't like?'". Their musical decisions were made with Schlesinger in mind, and Durand added that "even though he wasn't there physically [...] he was absolutely there spiritually". Chase also explained that because of initially relocating "All I Ever Wanted", they were able to "discover this whole cache of new songs". This led them to pursue recording a seventh Ivy studio album utilizing these recordings, titled Traces of You, which he revealed would be released sometime in 2025.

"All I Ever Wanted" was first released for digital download and streaming on September 4, 2024, through Bar None Records, the label behind Ivy's album reissues. Outside of digitally releasing two bonus tracks for Apartment Life, "All I Ever Wanted" was Ivy's first new release since their 2011 studio album All Hours and their first song since Schlesinger's death. The song also appears on the vinyl reissue of Long Distance as a bonus track, alongside the group's cover of "Digging Your Scene" and a remix of their 2001 single "Edge of the Ocean".

== Composition ==
"All I Ever Wanted" was written by Chase, Durand, and Schlesinger, and produced by Cole. It's a guitar-driven indie pop song with its instrumentation taken from 1997. Schlesinger's contributions were left intact and, additionally, Cole performs guitar on the track.

== Reception ==
Exclaim!'s Kaelen Bell said the song "unsurprisingly rules" although he wished it were released earlier in the summertime. Chris Neville from Stereogum was surprised the song had not been released sooner because "it's fantastic"; he wrote, "if you are about guitar-based indie pop music at all, you should listen to this one." WYMS's Erin Wolf featured the song in her Best New Music playlist for the week of September 16, 2024.
