= Distant Lights (song) =

Single by Ivy

from the album All Hours
- Released: June 7, 2011
- Recorded: 2011
- Genre: EDM; indie pop
- Length: 5:23
- Label: Nettwerk
- Songwriter(s): Adam Schlesinger; Andy Chase
- Producer(s): Adam Schlesinger; Andy Chase

Ivy singles chronology
"Thinking About You" (2005)	"Distant Lights" (2011)	"Fascinated" (2011)

"Distant Lights" is a song by American indie rock band Ivy. It was released as the lead single from their sixth studio album, All Hours (2011). It was issued in the United States on June 7, 2011 as a digital download by Nettwerk. The single was written and produced by Adam Schlesinger and Andy Chase.

After its release, "Distant Lights" received generally favorable reviews from music critics, who complemented the track for being entirely different when compared to Ivy's previous material. However, one reviewer found the track to be unimaginative and dated. The track was made available as a free download for a short amount of time in support of the release of All Hours.

== Background and development ==
After the release of In the Clear (2005), Ivy embarked on an extended hiatus to focus their time on their children and solo careers. Member Adam Schlesinger was busy with his side project Fountains of Wayne, while Andy Chase was working on a new band named Brookville. In 2008, they worked on a new record, even completing most of the project. However, after listening to the completed material, they found it to be "awful"; Chase stated that "it was the first time [they] doubted whether [they] even had another Ivy album left in [them]".

Afraid that Ivy would become "unrecognizable" and "boring", Durand stated that "[she] really can't stand when [she sees] musicians, great songwriters, and after having kids they become so boring, [she talks] about that all day. [She doesn't] need to talk about that in [her] songs", concluding that she needed "escape". Durand was determined to create "the best album yet", and set up dates and recording sessions with Chase and Schlesinger to work on what would become All Hours. The album explored new genres for Ivy, including EDM and electronic music, something Chase stated "seem[ed] natural and ma[de] sense".

== Composition and release ==
"Distant Lights" was written and produced by Schlesinger and Chase. According to Nettwerk, the single "is a slow-building, hypnotic and danceable track", yet manages to sound like Ivy. In a review by Lauren Stern of Pop Break, she called the single "completely different" compared to Ivy's previous material. In an interview with Jody Rosen of Rolling Stone, Durand stated that "'Distant Lights' is, in a sense, the most important song on All Hours. It's the song that created and led to the direction of this record"; in the same interview, Rosen claimed that the track had a "sleek beat" and "wistful melody" that served as the background for Durand's vocals that come off "halfway between a coo and a sigh".

The single was released on June 7, 2011 on iTunes, where it came with B-side single "Lost in the Sun". It became Ivy's first single release since the 2005 recording "Thinking About You". In September of the same year, Nettwerk made the single temporarily available as a free download to promote All Hours. A remix EP was released on January 20, 2012 in the United States and France and featured the original composition, a Douze remix and a Douze dub version of the single.

== Critical reception ==
"Distant Lights" received generally favorable reviews from contemporary music critics. Jody Rosen of Rolling Stone praised the single for being "seductive", while Frank Mojica of Consequence of Sound called the "essential" track the "perfect choice for a lead single", further stating that "'Distant Lights' is the most danceable work from Ivy yet". PopMatters writer John Bergstrom was impressed by the single, stating that "it sounds deceptively effortless". Kaitlyn Henaghan of Buzz Weekly found it to be "the obvious choice for a single, as it is extraordinarily catchy with a great, upbeat melody". Dorian S. Ham, writing for The Agit Reader, had mixed feelings towards the single, calling it "slightly worrying" and panning the "clubby beat" as being foreign to Ivy's catalog. Shawn Connelly of SecretSoundShop found the track "boring" and "outdated".

== Track listings and formats ==
American digital download
No.	Title	Length
1.	"Distant Lights"	5:23
2.	"Lost in the Sun"	3:27

American/French Remix EP
No.	Title	Length
1.	"Distant Lights"	5:23
2.	"Distant Lights" (Douze Remix)	5:43
3.	"Distant Lights" (Douze Dub)	5:54

== Credits and personnel ==
Credits and personnel adapted from All Hours liner notes and Ivy's AllMusic discography.

Personnel

- Andy Chase – engineering, executive producer, mixing
- Ruddy Cullers – engineering
- Bruce Driscoll – programming
- Dominique Durand – lead and background vocals
- Philippe Garcia – photography
- Josh Grier – legal advisor
- Brian Hill – art direction, design
- Ted Jensen – mastering
- Atsuo Matsumoto – assistant mixing
- Adam Schlesinger – engineering, executive producer, mixing

== Release history ==
Region	Date	Format	Label	Ref.
United States	June 7, 2011	Digital download	Nettwerk	
United States	January 30, 2012	Remix EP	Nettwerk	
France	January 30, 2012	Remix EP	Nettwerk	
