= Get Enough (Ivy song) =

Single by Ivy

from the album Realistic
- B-side: "Drag You Down"
- Released: 1994
- Recorded: 1994
- Studio: The Place (New York City)
- Genre: Folk rock; pop
- Length: 2:42
- Label: Seed
- Songwriters: Dominique Durand; Adam Schlesinger; Andy Chase
- Producers: Adam Schlesinger; Andy Chase; Kurt Ralske

Ivy singles chronology
"Get Enough" (1994)	"Don't Believe a Word" (1995)

"Get Enough" is the debut single by American band Ivy, released in 1994 by Seed Records. It was included as the opening track for their first studio album, Realistic (1995). It was composed by band members Dominique Durand, Adam Schlesinger and Andy Chase, and produced by the latter two and Kurt Ralske. The song was conceived while the band was creating material for their first extended play, Lately (1994), a project that Durand was initially reluctant to work on. Its production, along with the rest of Realistic, was inspired by French musicians and exhibits a folk rock and pop sound.

The song was praised by music critics, who enjoyed the production and Durand's French accent and gentle vocals. "Get Enough" was performed live on several occasions, including at least three times in 1995 in California at record shops and music festivals.

== Background and development ==
Ivy was formed in 1994, spurred by Andy Chase's wish to form a band. After repeatedly encouraging member Dominique Durand to sing, she reluctantly lent her vocals to the demo of "Can't Even Fake It", which would eventually appear on their debut EP, Lately (1994). Along with instrumentalist and musician Adam Schlesinger, they recorded several more songs, including "Get Enough" and "Drag You Down", the later of which would serve as the vinyl release's B-side track. Durand later admitted to CMJ New Music Monthly's Chris Cuffaro that the music behind Realistic (1995) was inspired by French musicians such as Françoise Hardy and Serge Gainsbourg, singers she had grown up listening to while living in France.

The composition was written by Durand, Chase and Schlesinger, and produced by the latter two and Kurt Ralske. It was recorded and mixed by the trio at The Place, a recording studio in New York City, while it was mastered by Greg Calbi at Sterling Sound Studios in Chelsea. It was described as a folk rock and pop song by AllMusic. According to the back side of the record's packaging, "Get Enough" had a limited release consisting of only 2,000 printed copies; each individual vinyl sleeve included a handwritten number indicating which copy the consumer received. A remixed version of the recording was also released in 1994, created by Paul Q. Kolderie and Sean Slade as a CD single. In his book New York Rock, author Steven Blush compared "Get Enough" to the works of German musician Nico.

== Critical reception ==
"Get Enough" was highlighted by critics due to Durand's vocals and its simple production. Vickie Gilmer and Ira Robbins of Trouser Press were impressed by the singer's vocal delivery on the track. The pair claimed that her "airy, petal-soft lilt and the music's toned-down pop bounce make it forever Ivy". Billboard's Larry Flick reviewed the CD single as part of his "Single Reviews: Rock Tracks" column. He wrote that Durand's "seductive French accent seeps through a suspiciously sugar-sweet delivery", and noted that her delivery comes off "pure as dirt, but cool nonetheless". British newspaper Melody Maker named "Get Enough" a "Single of the Week" in 1994.

== Live appearances ==
In order to promote "Get Enough", Ivy performed at several music festivals and made several concert appearances. Serving as the opening act for English band Gene, the trio performed "Get Enough" (along with "Shallow" and "Don't Believe a Word") at Union Square in San Francisco on July 21, 1995. Aurore Bacmann from Twee Kitten noted that the rendition was "very good" and "never too loud, but pleasantly enough to distract you from your grim thoughts and worries". Additional performances with varying set lists occurred the same day at Wherehouse Records on Powell Street, where Durand allowed the audience to request certain songs, and at Rasputin Records in Berkeley, California, the following afternoon.

== Track listing and formats ==
- 7" single
1. "Get Enough" – 2:42
2. "Drag You Down" – 2:22
- Promotional CD single
1. "Get Enough" (Paul Q. Kolderie & Sean Slade Remix) – 2:41

== Personnel ==
Credits adapted from the liner notes of Realistic.

- Andy Chase – engineering, executive producer, mixing
- Dominique Durand – lead and background vocals
- Greg Calbi – mastering
- Eric Calvi – mixing
- Glenn Orenstein – production coordinator
- Kurt Ralske – engineering, executive producer
- Adam Schlesinger – engineering, executive producer, mixing
- Andy Van Dette – technical assistance

== Release history ==
Release dates and formats for "Get Enough"
Region	Date	Format(s)	Label	Ref.
United States	1994	7"; CD	Seed	
