= Fascinated (Ivy song) =

Single by Ivy

from the album All Hours
- Released: July 26, 2011
- Recorded: 2011
- Genre: Electronica
- Length: 4:21
- Label: Nettwerk
- Songwriters: Adam Schlesinger; Andy Chase
- Producers: Adam Schlesinger; Andy Chase

Ivy singles chronology
"Distant Lights" (2011)	"Fascinated" (2011)	"Lost in the Sun" (2012)

"Fascinated" is a song by American band Ivy. It was released as the second single from their sixth studio album, All Hours (2011), and made available for digital download on July 26, 2011, by Nettwerk in the United States. The song was written and produced by both Adam Schlesinger and Andy Chase. An electronica song, "Fascinated" uses keyboards and a repetitive, simple chorus throughout its duration; Ivy's take on the production was called "European" by one critic.

"Fascinated" received mixed to positive responses from music critics. While being appreciated for its "catchiness", a reviewer was critical for the song containing a "boring" composition. An accompanying music video for the track was released on October 25, 2011, featuring various scenes of the band performing the track in a "colorful" world with robotic dancers playing several instruments.

== Background and composition ==
"Fascinated" was first announced on June 7, 2011, along with news concerning a song titled "Distant Lights". It was released on July 26, 2011, nearly one month after the former track had become available for digital consumption. While recording of the track was done exclusively by the members of Ivy in their respective homes, "Fascinated" was written and produced by Adam Schlesinger and Andy Chase. The two also handled engineering of the song, with additional assistance being credited to Ruddy Cullers. Atsuo Matsumoto and Bruce Driscoll performed mixing and programming for the composition, respectively. Described as a flashback to "'80s synth pop" music, the track has been classified in the electronica genre, in contrast to the more "melodic guitar pop" vibe that was featured on their previous studio album, In the Clear (2005). Agreeing with the consensus, Nettwerk claimed that the single "sounds like a lost 80's synth-pop hit remixed for today". The recording incorporates keyboards in its instrumentation, while lead singer Dominique Durand repeats its title throughout the chorus. PopMatters's John Bergstrom described Ivy's approach on the track as "cold, European attitude".

== Critical reception ==
The release of "Fascinated" was met with mixed to positive responses from contemporary music critics. AllMusic's Matt Collar was appreciative of the single, which he described as a "catchy pop moment". A critic from BlackBook agreed, stating that "songs like 'Fascinated' [...] sparkle with a catchy confidence". A staff member from Filter Magazine claimed that "surely your 80's obsessed best friend will love it". Bergstrom from PopMatters criticized "Fascinated", which he called an "undistinguished, flat-out boring song". He continued by questioning the refrain's simpleness and the production, which he found "annoying".

== Music video ==
An accompanying music video for "Fascinated" was released on October 25, 2011, via Nettwerk's official YouTube channel. The visual was directed by Schlesinger's close friend Adam Neustadter, who helped in creating a "colorful" and "vaguely disorienting clip" for the band. The video begins with Durand peering below a camera as flashing stills of a faceless man playing the keyboards appear. Three dancers, including a mime, a woman with sunglasses, and a ballerina, perform various choreography as the visual gradually zooms in and out of focus, achieving a 3D effect. As the first verse continues, Chase and Schlesinger are shown playing their respective instruments behind Durand, who sings the song's lyrics into a microphone. A similar process is carried out for the rest of the clip, and concludes by displaying the faceless individual using the keyboard. Commenting on the project's final result, Schlesinger insisted that it successfully matches the song's "synth-pop vibe" through the use of "robot dancing, some vintage synths, and a guy with no face".

== Track listing ==
Digital download
No.	Title	Length
1.	"Fascinated"	4:21

== Credits and personnel ==
Credits adapted from the liner notes of All Hours and Ivy's discography on AllMusic.

Personnel

- Andy Chase – engineering, executive producer, mixing
- Ruddy Cullers – engineering
- Bruce Driscoll – programming
- Dominique Durand – lead and background vocals
- Philippe Garcia – photography
- Josh Grier – legal advisor
- Brian Hill – art direction, design
- Ted Jensen – mastering
- Atsuo Matsumoto – assistant mixing
- Adam Schlesinger – engineering, executive producer, mixing

== Release history ==
Region	Date	Format	Label	Ref.
United States	July 26, 2011	Digital download	Nettwerk	
