= Lana Mir =

Ukrainian singer

Lana Mir is a singer-songwriter born and raised in Kyiv, Ukraine. She released her debut album on Unfiltered Records in 2010. Her music is vintage-tinged indie pop, made distinctive by her Ukrainian heritage. She obtained her degree from University of California, Berkeley, with a major in Psychology.

== History ==
Mir grew up in Kyiv and says she was "isolated from the music I loved," which eventually led her to New York. She was motivated to become a singer after seeing the video "Nothing Compares 2 U" by Sinéad O'Connor on MTV.

By the time she started secondary school, she wanted to be a professional singer. On the subway, she met the editor of Ukraine's only music magazine. He co-wrote a song for her which was broadcast on the most commercial Ukrainian-French radio station in the country. She was soon performing at events and doing other spokesperson duties for the station.

After moving to New York City and struggling to survive, she met musicians at a Russian-American cafe who taught her jazz and bossa nova. She was introduced to the band Brookville and suggested a collaboration with Andy Chase, founder of Brookville, Ivy, and Unfiltered Records. Chase co-wrote, co-produced, and played on her debut album, Lana Mir, with his frequent collaborator, Bruce Driscoll.

Her debut album was released in August 2010 and includes a cover of "I Wanna Be Adored" by The Stone Roses. In an interview with Pop Matters, she said she is inspired by the singers Ella Fitzgerald, Astrud Gilberto, Billie Holiday, and Tracey Thorn.

== Discography ==
- Goodbye Girl EP (Unfiltered, 2010)
- Lana Mir (Unfiltered, 2010)
