= Disappointed (Ivy song) =

2001 single by Ivy

Single by Ivy

from the album Long Distance
- Released: July 10, 2001
- Recorded: 2000
- Studio: Stratosphere Sound (New York City, New York); Sony Music (New York City, New York)
- Genre: Indie pop; indie rock
- Length: 4:24
- Label: Nettwerk
- Songwriter(s): Dominique Durand; Adam Schlesinger; Andy Chase
- Producer(s): Adam Schlesinger; Andy Chase; Peter Nashel

Ivy singles chronology
"Lucy Doesn't Love You" (2000)	"Disappointed" (2001)	"Edge of the Ocean" (2001)

"Disappointed" is a song by American indie rock band Ivy. It was released as the second single from their third studio album, Long Distance (2000). It was released exclusively in the United States on July 10, 2001 by Nettwerk. The release was simultaneous with the release of '"Edge of the Ocean". The track was written by Dominique Durand, Adam Schlesinger and Andy Chase, while production was handled by the latter two and Peter Nashel.

The single received generally favorable reviews from music critics, who found it "memorable" and admired Durand's vocals. Similar to Ivy's previous material, "Disappointed" is an indie pop and indie rock song. To promote the song, Ivy performed it live on Late Night with Conan O'Brien in 2001.

== Background and recording ==
It took several years for Ivy to finalize the material included on the album, due to the birth of lead singer Dominque Durand and musician Andy Chase's daughter, Justine, in 1999. During the album's recording and writing process, Ivy experienced several unexpected events. Following their drop from Epic Records in 1999, the recording suffered further delays after their New York City studio burned down. After being without a record label, they considered signing to Japanese music group EastWest to strengthen their fan base. However, independent record label Nettwerk offered to fund the album; Ivy signed with both labels and began preparing it for a national release.

During recording sessions for the song, Adam Schlesinger and Chase played around with the idea of incorporating new genres into their music; in an interview with Billboard, Ivy stated, "The first songs [we] recorded were jangly and simple and straight-ahead. We started gravitating toward the groovier, slightly more melancholy stuff. It works well with Dominique's voice". With the exploration, Ivy began crafting "stronger" songs, that were less atmospheric than those on their previous studio album, Apartment Life (1997), but contained more "infectious melodies".

== Composition and promotion ==
"Disappointed" was written by Durand, Schlesinger and Chase, while production was handled by Schlesinger, Chase and Peter Nashel. The song is an indie pop and indie rock song, similar to Ivy's signature sound. AllMusic claimed that the single's "taut rhythm and slinky guitars provide a sleekly sexy backdrop for Durand's wistful vocals". A reviewer from indie blogger Baby Sue called it a "strange and haunting composition with an unforgettable chorus." The track was released as a digital download on July 10, 2001, alongside "Edge of the Ocean"; both singles were released to adult alternative radio on the same day.

To promote Long Distance, Ivy performed "Disappointed" live on a 2001 episode of Late Night with Conan O'Brien. For the performance, the band members wore large, insulated coats and T-shirts. Chase and Schlesinger provided backup vocals for Durand, while Chase played the guitar and Schlesinger played the keyboards.

== Critical response ==
"Disappointed" received generally favorable reviews from contemporary music critics. Jonathan Cohen from Billboard praised the track and commented that "Durand's sensual vocals are beguiling as ever". A reviewer from CMJ New Music Monthly enjoyed "the lazy float" of the track, further commenting that "Durand's near-catatonic delivery [is] not a bad idea". AllMusic's Stephen Thomas Erlewine complimented the single's production and Durand's vocals, while fellow AllMusic writer Heather Phares enjoyed the intimacy of the song.

== Track listings and formats ==
United States digital download
No.	Title	Length
1.	"Disappointed"	4:24

== Credits and personnel ==
Credits and personnel adapted from Long Distance liner notes and Andy Chase's discography.

Recording

- Recorded at Stratosphere Sound, New York City and Sony Music Studios, New York City

Personnel

- Andy Chase – engineering, executive producer, mixing
- Dominique Durand – lead and background vocals
- Philippe Garcia – photography
- John Holbrook – additional mixing
- Vlado Meller – mastering
- Peter Nashel – additional production
- Frank Olinsky – art direction, design
- Geoff Sanoff – assistant engineering
- Adam Schlesinger – engineering, executive producer, mixing

== Release history ==
Region	Date	Format	Label
United States	July 10, 2001	Digital download	Nettwerk
United States	July 10, 2001	Adult alternative radio	Nettwerk
