= Lately (EP) =

EP by Ivy
- Released: May 1994
- Recorded: 1994
- Studio: The Place (New York City); Studio I'Hôpital Éphémère (Paris); Sterling (New York City)
- Genre: French pop
- Length: 17:36
- Label: Seed
- Producer: Andy Chase; Peter Nashel; Adam Schlesinger

Ivy chronology
Lately (1994)	Realistic (1995)

Singles from Lately
- 1. "I Hate December" Released: January 12, 1996

Lately is the first extended play recorded by American band Ivy, released in May 1994 by Seed Records. Developed in the same year as the formation of the group, Lately is a French pop album with acoustic and general pop influences. Originally conceived by members Dominique Durand and Andy Chase, the pair recruited Adam Schlesinger for additional production and lyrics. Sessions took place in New York City and Paris, where they recorded four original tracks and a cover of Orange Juice's 1984 song "I Guess I'm Just a Little Too Sensitive".

"I Hate December" was released as the EP's only single on January 12, 1996, preceded by a music video that was filmed earlier in 1995. Lately was praised for its non-formulaic production and original material. Ivy was also outed for being unlike other New York City bands. The EP was reissued on August 26, 2003, after Ivy transferred their entire music catalog to Unfiltered Records, a record label founded by Chase during work for his side project Brookville.

== Development and legacy ==
In early 1994, musicians Andy Chase and Dominique Durand met up to record music together, which would form the basis for Ivy. After enjoying several of the finished products, the pair formed the group and invited Adam Schlesinger to join them. Together they wrote and produced "Get Enough" which was well received by the public. According to writer Steven Blush in his book New York Rock, after Melody Maker named the track "Single of the Week", work on Lately was initiated. For the project, Ivy recorded four original compositions in addition to a cover of Orange Juice's 1984 single "I Guess I'm Just a Little Too Sensitive". The version of the cover that appears on Lately is slightly different compared to the one featured on Ivy's fourth studio album, Guestroom (2002); it was also the band's first cover of a song released. Coincidentally, Ivy toured with Edwyn Collins, the writer of the song, shortly after the EP was released.

Recording sessions for Lately took place throughout early 1994 at The Place in New York City and Studio I'Hôpital Éphémère in Paris. During the meetings, the band members worked with several musicians for the track, including Evan Richey, who handled the cello arrangements for "Can't Even Fake It"; Ted Jensen, who mastered the recordings at Sterling Sound Studios in New York City; and Jean-Pierre Sluys, who served as an assistant mixer to both Chase and Schlesinger. In 2003, Ivy shifted their entire catalog to Chase's newly founded record label Unfiltered Records. Following the release of Chase's side project Wonderfully Nothing (2003) with his band Brookville, Lately (along with Realistic (1995) and Apartment Life (1997)) was reissued on August 26, 2003.

== Composition and promotion ==
According to the members of Ivy, the release displayed Durand's "heavily accented" vocals and Chase and Schlesinger's "pop melodies and jangly guitars". As described by Ira A. Robbins, editor of The Trouser Press Guide to '90s Rock, Ivy was attempting to bring French pop music back into the American music industry. The lyrics were summarized as "lifting, wispy, and shimmering" by Jay Stowe, a columnist for Spin. Chase and Schlesinger solely produced the EP, while the two plus Durand handled the lyrics.

The record's only single, "I Hate December", was released on January 12, 1996, as a remix on a CD single. However, the release was issued by Scratchie Records instead of Seed, as the band had departed from the latter label after completing Realistic. A music video for it was produced by Doug Werby and released sometime in 1995. Schlesinger described the inspiration behind the track as being an "anti-Christian single" and called the remixed version "groovy".

"I Guess I'm Just a Little Too Sensitive" was covered in an acoustic style. Robbins and Vickie Gibbons of Trouser Press noted that Durand's pronunciation of "little" in the track sounded more like "lee-dull".

== Critical reception ==
Professional ratings
Review scores
Source	Rating
AllMusic	3/5 stars

AllMusic's Nitsuh Abebe was generally positive towards Lately, claiming that "its five songs let their dreamier elements come straight from the [...] songwriting" and that it is an example of "sophisticated pop that Ivy created". Stowe from Spin wrote that Ivy was unlike other New York City bands in the way that they catered to "unabashed pop melodies", and later joked that the "concept [is] so far out it's in"; Stowe also described their version of "I Guess I'm Just a Little Too Sensitive" as a "charming" and "special treat".

== Track listing ==
No.	Title	Writer(s)	Producer(s)	Length
1.	"Wish It All Away"	Andy Chase; Adam Schlesinger; Dominique Durand	Chase; Schlesinger	3:10
2.	"Twisting"	Chase; Schlesinger; Durand	Chase; Schlesinger	4:15
3.	"I Hate December"	Chase; Schlesinger; Durand	Chase; Schlesinger; Peter Nashel	2:33
4.	"Can't Even Fake It"	Chase; Schlesinger; Durand	Chase; Schlesinger	3:30
5.	"I Guess I'm Just a Little Too Sensitive"	Edwyn Collins	Chase; Schlesinger	4:08
Total length:				17:36

== Personnel ==
Credits adapted from the liner notes of Lately.

- Andy Chase – engineering, executive producer, mixing
- Dominique Durand – lead and background vocals
- Ned Farr – photography
- Ted Jensen – mastering
- Peter Nashel – producer
- Evan Richey – cello
- Adam Schlesinger – engineering, executive producer, mixing
- Jean-Pierre Sluys – assistant mixing

== Release history ==
Region	Date	Format	Label
United States	May 1994	10-inch LP	Seed
United States	August 26, 2003	10-inch LP, CD	Unfiltered
