= Thinking About You (Ivy song) =

Single by Ivy

from the album In the Clear
- Released: January 1, 2005
- Recorded: 2004
- Genre: Indie pop
- Length: 4:13
- Label: Nettwerk
- Songwriters: Dominique Durand, Adam Schlesinger, Andy Chase
- Producer: Steve Osborne

Ivy singles chronology
"Digging Your Scene" (2001)	"Thinking About You" (2005)	"Distant Lights" (2011)

"Thinking About You" is a song by American indie rock band Ivy. It was released as the lead single from their fifth studio album, In the Clear, in the United States on January 1, 2005.

== Music video ==
A highly popular animated music video was produced for the song in early 2005. The clip follows several insects interacting in a rainforest.

== In media ==
"Thinking About You" was included on two different soundtracks: Fever Pitch: Music from the Motion Picture and Monster-in-Law (Music from the Motion Picture).

== Track listing ==
CD single
No.	Title	Length
1.	"Thinking About You"	4:13

== Release history ==
Region	Date	Format	Label
United States	January 1, 2005	CD	Nettwerk America
