= Tom Bernthal =

American marketing CEO

- Born: 1974 (age 51–52); Washington, D.C., U.S.
- Education: University of Wisconsin–Madison
- Occupations: CEO and former NBC News producer
- Organization: Kelton Global
- Spouse: Sheryl Sandberg (m. 2022)
- Children: 3
- Relatives: Jon Bernthal (brother); Murray Bernthal (grandfather); Adam Schlesinger (cousin)
- Awards: News & Documentary Emmy Award

Thomas Bernthal is the founder and former CEO of a strategic consulting agency, Kelton Global, and former NBC News producer.

== Early life ==
Bernthal was born the eldest of three boys in Washington, D.C., to Joan Lurie (née Marx) and Eric Lawrence "Rick" Bernthal, a former lawyer with Latham & Watkins LLP and currently chair of the board of directors for the Humane Society of the United States. His paternal grandfather was musician and producer Murray Bernthal. He has two brothers, Jon, an actor, and Nicholas, an orthopedic surgeon and professor at UCLA. Bernthal and his family are Jewish.

Bernthal grew up in Cabin John, Maryland. He attended the Sidwell Friends School.

== Career ==
Bernthal began his career working at the White House's Communication Office during the Bill Clinton administration. Following this stint, he worked as a news producer and journalist for NBC News. During his six years with NBC, Bernthal produced segments for the Today Show, Nightly News, Dateline, MSNBC and CNBC and won three Emmy Awards for his work.

In 2000, Bernthal moved to Los Angeles, where he continued to work for NBC before founding his own marketing and consulting agency in 2002, Kelton Global. He is a former CEO of the organization.

== Personal life ==
Bernthal has three children from his first wife, whom he divorced in 2020.

Bernthal began dating Facebook COO Sheryl Sandberg in the spring of 2019. The two were engaged in February 2020, and were married in August 2022.
