= Bernie Bernthal =

American soccer player

Personal information
- Date of birth: September 10, 1960 (age 66)
- Place of birth: Manhasset, New York, U.S.
- Position: Forward

Senior career*
Years	Team	Apps	(Gls)
1979–1980	Limoges		
1980–1981	Hartford Hellions (indoor)	8	(3)
1981–1982	Pittsburgh Spirit (indoor)	24	(4)
1983–1984	La Chaux-de-Fonds		
- * Club domestic league appearances and goals

Robert "Bernie" Bernthal is an American retired soccer forward who played professionally in Europe and the United States before becoming a professional skier and mountain climber.

In 1979, Bernthal signed with FC Limoges. He returned to the United States in 1980 and joined the Hartford Hellions of the Major Indoor Soccer League. In October 1981, Bernthal signed with the Pittsburgh Spirit. In 1983, he moved to FC La Chaux-de-Fonds. Bernthal retired in 1984 and became a professional skier and mountain climber. From 1995 to 2001, he worked as the special events coordinator for The Swatch Group. In 2004, he became the European brand director for K2 Sports.
