= Lost in the Sun (song) =

Single by Ivy

from the album All Hours
- B-side: "We Try"
- Released: April 10, 2012
- Recorded: 2011
- Genre: Indie pop
- Length: 3:27
- Label: Unfiltered Records; Nettwerk
- Songwriter(s): Adam Schlesinger; Andy Chase
- Producer(s): Adam Schlesinger; Andy Chase

Ivy singles chronology
"Fascinated" (2011)	"Lost in the Sun" (2012)	"All I Ever Wanted" (2024)

"Lost in the Sun" is a song by American indie rock band Ivy. It was released as the third and final single from their sixth studio album, All Hours (2011). It was issued in the United States on April 10, 2012 as a digital download by Nettwerk and Unfiltered Records. The single was written and produced by Adam Schlesinger and Andy Chase.

== Background and composition ==
In Matt Collar's AllMusic description of the track, he stated that it is a "more detached electronica" song with "a slick if still airy mix of melodic guitar pop".

== Critical reception ==
"Lost in the Sun" received mixed to positive reviews from critics. John Bergstrom of PopMatters enjoyed "Lost in the Sun", but preferred Ivy's "World Without You" more.

== Music video ==
A music video for the song was filmed in early 2012 and released on August 23, 2012. The video shows singer Dominique Durand lounging on the beach while singing the song.

== Track listings and formats ==
United States digital download
No.	Title	Length
1.	"Lost in the Sun"	3:27
2.	"We Try"	4:00

== Credits and personnel ==
Credits and personnel adapted from All Hours liner notes and Ivy's AllMusic discography.

Personnel

- Andy Chase – engineering, executive producer, mixing
- Ruddy Cullers – engineering
- Bruce Driscoll – programming
- Dominique Durand – lead and background vocals
- Philippe Garcia – photography
- Josh Grier – legal advisor
- Brian Hill – art direction, design
- Ted Jensen – mastering
- Atsuo Matsumoto – assistant mixing
- Adam Schlesinger – engineering, executive producer, mixing

== Release history ==
Region	Date	Format	Label
United States	April 10, 2012	Digital download	Unfiltered, Nettwerk America
