= For the Kids (album series) =

2002 compilation album

Compilation album by Various Artists
- Released: November 5, 2002
- Genre: Children's music
- Length: 40:56
- Label: Nettwerk Records

Professional ratings
Review scores
Source	Rating
Allmusic	3/5 stars

For the Kids is a series of albums featuring renderings of children's songs performed by contemporary popular artists. In the United States, a portion of the proceeds go to VH1's Save the Music Foundation. In Canada, a portion of the proceeds go to The Sarah McLachlan Music Outreach (Sarah McLachlan Foundation).

There are two follow-up compilation albums: For the Kids Too! (2004) and For the Kids Three (2007).

== Track listing ==
No.	Title	Artist	Length
1.	"Mahna Mahna"	Cake	2:53
2.	"La La La La Lemon"	Barenaked Ladies	1:57
3.	"The Rainbow Connection"	Sarah McLachlan	3:30
4.	"I've Got to Be Clean"	Guster	2:07
5.	"Wonderwheel"	Dan Zanes	3:22
6.	"Have a Little Fun"	Glen Phillips	2:28
7.	"The Hoppity Song"	Five for Fighting	2:27
8.	"My Flying Saucer"	Billy Bragg with Wilco	1:45
9.	"It's All Right to Cry"	Darius Rucker	2:07
10.	"Sing"	Ivy	2:50
11.	"Bright Eyes"	Remy Zero	2:33
12.	"Willie the King"	Dan Wilson	3:22
13.	"Snow Day"	Bleu	2:19
14.	"Twinkle, Twinkle, Little Star"	Raine Maida and Chantal Kreviazuk	2:43
15.	"Goodnight Children Everywhere"	Sixpence None the Richer	3:23
16.	"Bend Down the Branches"	Tom Waits	1:05

== For the Kids Too! ==
For the Kids Too!

Compilation album by Various Artists
- Released: October 19, 2004
- Genre: Children's music
- Label: Nettwerk Records

Professional ratings
Review scores
Source	Rating
Allmusic	3.5/5 stars

No.	Title	Artist	Length
1.	"I'm Different"	Butterfly Boucher	2:25
2.	"I Like to Run, I Like to Jump"	David Mead	2:44
3.	"At the Bottom of the Sea"	Ralph's World	1:58
4.	"Everybody Came"	Ambrosia Parsley	3:14
5.	"Catch the Moon"	Lisa Loeb and Elizabeth Mitchell	3:06
6.	"Starfish and Coffee"	Matt Nathanson	2:59
7.	"John Lee Supertaster"	They Might Be Giants	2:00
8.	"The Rainbow Connection"	Jason Mraz	2:31
9.	"Peanut Butter Toast"	Sarah Harmer	2:19
10.	"Your Attitude Towards Cuttlefish"	Paper Moon	3:34
11.	"I Often Dream of Trains"	Robyn Hitchcock	2:45
12.	"My Favorite Things"	Nathan	2:41
13.	"The Very First Day"	Ron Sexsmith	1:57
14.	"Meow Meow Lullaby"	Nada Surf	2:40
15.	"Good Night"	Matthew Sweet	3:16
16.	"Telephone Song"	Kirsty Hawkshaw	2:29

== For the Kids Three! ==
For the Kids Three!

Compilation album by Various Artists
- Released: October 2, 2007
- Genre: Children's music
- Label: Nettwerk Records

No.	Title	Artist	Length
1.	"I Want to Have Fun"	Of Montreal	2:33
2.	"See You on the Moon"	Great Lake Swimmers	4:08
3.	"The Poopsmith Song"	Over the Rhine	2:36
4.	"My Little Bird"	Rogue Wave	3:13
5.	"Itsy Bitsy Spider"	O.A.R.	1:41
6.	"The Other Day I Met a Bear"	Barenaked Ladies	2:20
7.	"The Babysitter's Here"	Dar Williams	3:57
8.	"I'm a Believer"	The Sippy Cups	3:03
9.	"If You're Happy and You Know It"	Anathallo	1:37
10.	"Does Your Cat Have a Mustache?"	The Format	3:52
11.	"Sleep So Very Long"	Moby featuring Chrissi Poland	3:31
12.	"My Darling Clementine"	The Submarines	4:12
13.	"Wheels on the Bus"	Kyle Andrews	2:51
14.	"New Shoes"	Blitzen Trapper	2:07
15.	"Sunny"	P:ano	1:49
16.	"Jellyman Kelly"	Mates of State	2:26
17.	"No Hiding"	Hem	2:10
18.	"The Lint Song"	MC Lars	2:54
19.	"Pure Imagination"	Jolie Holland	3:14
20.	"Small as Me"	Rosie Thomas with Damien Jurado	1:23
