= Guestroom (album) =

Studio album by Ivy
- Released: September 10, 2002
- Recorded: 1994–2002
- Studio: Various: Stratosphere Sound; Room With a Jew; The Place (New York City, New York)
- Genres: Indie pop; indie rock
- Length: 35:42
- Labels: Minty Fresh; Unfiltered
- Producers: Andy Chase; Adam Schlesinger; Gary Maurer

Ivy chronology
Long Distance (2000)	Guestroom (2002)	In the Clear (2005)

Singles from Guestroom
- 1. "Digging Your Scene" Released: June 2001; 2. "Let's Go to Bed" Released: 2002

Guestroom is the fourth studio album by the band Ivy. It was released on September 10, 2002, by Minty Fresh and Unfiltered Records. Unlike the group's previous albums, the album consisted entirely of cover songs, without any new material. Some of the songs featured on the album were previously released as B-sides to the band's singles.

Two singles were released from Guestroom. Lead single, "Digging Your Scene" was previously recorded for Ivy's previous studio release, Long Distance (2001), but an updated version appeared on this album for the single release. "Let's Go to Bed" was released as the final single for the album in late 2002. Another song, "I Guess I'm Just a Little Too Sensitive", was also previously recorded on their debut extended play, Lately.

Upon release, Guestroom featured mostly positive reviews from music critics, who praised the covers included on the album. Dominique Durand's vocals were also praised for being "wispy" and "warm".

The Japanese edition of Guestroom was reissued on April 18, 2015, in the United States by Minty Fresh.

== Critical reception ==
Professional ratings
Review scores
Source	Rating
AllMusic	4/5 stars
Exclaim!	Mixed

Guestroom received generally positive reviews from critics. MacKenzie Wilson of AllMusic praised Ivy for the "divine picks, particularly "I Don't Know Why I Love You", further adding that "Guestroom is an added bonus for new and old fans alike". In a divided review, Noel Dix of Exclaim! stated that "sadly, this is not the follow-up to stunning Long Distance", but later added that "the real treat of Guestroom is the stunning manipulation of "Be My Baby".

== Track listing ==
All tracks produced by Andy Chase and Adam Schlesinger, except "Be My Baby", which is also produced by Gary Maurer.

Guestroom – Standard edition
No.	Title	Writer(s)	Original artist	Length
1.	"Let's Go to Bed"	Laurence Tolhurst; Robert Smith	The Cure	4:16
2.	"Kite"	Nick Heyward	Nick Heyward	3:13
3.	"Say Goodbye"	Shivika Asthana; Keith Gendel; Tony Goddess	Papas Fritas	3:40
4.	"Streets of Your Town"	Robert Forster; Grant McLennan	The Go-Betweens	3:37
5.	"I Don't Know Why I Love You"	Guy Chadwick	The House of Love	2:48
6.	"Only a Fool Would Say That"	Donald Fagen; Walter Becker	Steely Dan	3:00
7.	"Digging Your Scene"	Robert Howard	The Blow Monkeys	3:40
8.	"L'Anamour"	Serge Gainsbourg	Serge Gainsbourg	2:36
9.	"Be My Baby"	Jeff Barry; Ellie Greenwich; Phil Spector	The Ronettes	4:41
10.	"I Guess I'm Just a Little Too Sensitive"	Edwyn Collins	Orange Juice	4:11
Total length:				35:42

Guestroom – 2015 Record Store Day edition
No.	Title	Writer(s)	Original artist	Length
11.	"Let's Go To Bed (Hawaii 82 Remix)"	Laurence Tolhurst; Robert Smith	The Cure	4:07
12.	"Cruel"	Paddy McAloon	Prefab Sprout	4:20
Total length:				44:09

== Personnel ==
Credits and personnel adapted from Guestroom liner notes and Andy Chase's discography.

- Marty Beller – drums
- Andy Chase – producer, mixer, engineer
- Ruddy Cullers – engineer
- Dominique Durand – lead and backing vocals
- Gary Maurer – mandolin
- Mark Plati – mixer
- Pedro Resende – co-producer
- Geoff Sanoff – engineer
- Adam Schlesinger – producer

== Release history ==
Region	Date	Label	Ref.
United States	September 10, 2002	Minty Fresh, Unfiltered Records	
Spain	September 10, 2002	Bittersweet Records	
Japan	September 10, 2002	Minty Fresh, Imperial Records	
United States	April 18, 2015	Minty Fresh	
