= Murray Bernthal =

American concert impresario (1911–2010)

- Bernthal in front of the Landmark Theatre, Syracuse, in 2004

Background information
- Born: April 15, 1911; Brooklyn, New York, U.S.
- Died: December 9, 2010 (aged 99) Syracuse, New York, U.S.
- Genres: Classical
- Occupations: Impresario, conductor, violinist, music educator
- Instruments: Violin
- Formerly of: Syracuse Symphony Orchestra

Murray Bernthal (April 15, 1911 – December 9, 2010) was an American concert impresario, conductor, and violinist active in Syracuse, New York, for more than six decades.

In 1946 he co-founded the Famous Artists series, a concert and touring-Broadway operation that he directed for 64 years, bringing many leading performers and productions to Central New York. He taught on the Syracuse University music faculty from 1932 until 1977. With his first wife, Rose, he was involved in the effort to save Syracuse's Landmark Theatre from demolition in the 1970s.

He was the grandfather of the actor Jon Bernthal and the musician Adam Schlesinger.

== Early life and education ==
Murray Bernthal was born on April 15, 1911, in Brooklyn, New York. He came to Syracuse in 1928 to attend Syracuse University on a partial basketball scholarship, but chose to forgo basketball when he was awarded a four-year music scholarship. He earned undergraduate and graduate degrees in music at the university.

== Music career ==
Murray Bernthal was a classically trained violinist. He joined the Syracuse University music faculty in 1932 and remained there for 45 years. He retired in 1977 as head of the string department. He founded and conducted orchestras and classical ensembles that preceded the Syracuse Symphony Orchestra and later played violin with the Syracuse Symphony Orchestra from 1961 to 1966.

During the 1940s he spent eight years as music director of radio station WSYR, where he hosted a nightly classical music program.

== Famous Artists series ==
In 1946, Bernthal co-founded the Famous Artists Series with E. R. "Curly" Vadeboncoeur. He directed the Famous Artists Broadway Theater Series, which brought touring Broadway musicals to Syracuse at the Crouse Hinds Theater at the John H. Mulroy Civic Center. He ran the operation for 64 years.

Over the years his productions brought to Syracuse such performers as Gloria Swanson, Tom Jones, Charlton Heston, Bela Lugosi and Zsa Zsa Gabor, musicians including Pinchas Zukerman, Van Cliburn and Arthur Rubinstein, and opera singers Luciano Pavarotti, Beverly Sills and Leontyne Price.

In its earlier years, before moving to Crouse Hinds Theater, the series presented shows at the Fayetteville Country Playhouse from 1949 to 1964 and at Henninger High School from 1965 to 1974. Bernthal and his first wife, Rose, ran Famous Artists together for five decades. After Bernthal's death, Albert Nocciolino continued the series.

== Landmark Theatre ==
Bernthal and his first wife, Rose, were among those who worked to save Syracuse's Landmark Theatre, the former Loew's State movie palace, from demolition in the 1970s. Bernthal recalled that when the theater was slated to become a parking lot, he and about a dozen others each put up $200 to begin buying it. He recruited further contributors until the group owned the building.

Rose oversaw much of the restoration and by 1977 became the newly named Landmark Theatre's first executive director.

== Personal life ==
Bernthal's first wife, Rose Wartsky Bernthal, was a violinist and his partner in Famous Artists. She died in 2002 at the age of 84. He later married Sherly Day Bernthal, who survived him. He had a son, Eric Bernthal, and a daughter, Barbara "Bobbi" Bernthal Schlesinger, as well as five grandchildren and five great-grandchildren.

His grandchildren included the actor Jon Bernthal and the musician Adam Schlesinger of the band Fountains of Wayne, born to his son and daughter, respectively.

Bernthal promoted his concerts under the billing "Murray Bernthal Presents." To celebrate the birth of his grandson Adam Lyons Schlesinger in 1967, he had the posters for a Jefferson Airplane concert at the Landmark Theatre printed with "Adam Lyons Presents" instead, after the newborn.

Bernthal died of natural causes at his home in Syracuse on December 9, 2010, at the age of 99.

== Honors ==
In February 1995, Bernthal received the Syracuse Post-Standard Achievement Award. The following year, he and Rose received a lifetime achievement award at the Syracuse Area Music Awards.
