= Long Distance (Ivy album) =

Studio album by Ivy
- Released: November 8, 2000
- Recorded: 1999–2000
- Studio: Stratosphere Sound; Sony Music (New York, NY)
- Genre: Indie pop; indie rock; new wave
- Length: 56:08
- Label: Nettwerk
- Producer: Andy Chase; Adam Schlesinger; Peter Nashel

Ivy chronology
| Apartment Life (1997) | Long Distance (2000) | Guestroom (2002) |

Singles from Long Distance
- 1. "Lucy Doesn't Love You" Released: 2000; 2. "Disappointed" Released: July 10, 2001; 3. "Edge of the Ocean" Released: July 10, 2001

Long Distance is the third studio album by the American band Ivy. It was released on November 8, 2000, in Japan, while the US version was released on July 10, 2001, by Nettwerk. A departure from Ivy's previous studio albums Realistic (1995) and Apartment Life (1997), Long Distance was influenced by new wave, but maintained Ivy's signature blend of indie pop and indie rock music. Ivy collaborated with long-time producer Peter Nashel for two of the album's tracks, while the rest were written and produced entirely by members Andy Chase and Adam Schlesinger.

Long Distance received positive reviews upon its release. Many critics favored Ivy's new approach, although some found it less interesting compared to the material on Apartment Life. Three singles were released from the album. "Lucy Doesn't Love You" and "Disappointed" were both commercially unsuccessful, while the album's third single, "Edge of the Ocean", appeared in numerous films and television programs and has since been considered the band's signature song. The songs "Undertow" and "Worry About You" were also used in media; the latter track was used as the theme song for the ABC miniseries Kingdom Hospital. Promotional music videos were created for both "Lucy Doesn't Love You" and "Edge of the Ocean".

== Development ==
Shortly after the release of Apartment Life (1997), Ivy began work on a new studio album; however, the band was dropped by their label, Atlantic Records, shortly after the reissue of Apartment Life was released. After the end of their contract with Atlantic, and lead singer Dominique Durand's pregnancy, the New York City studio where Ivy regularly recorded music burned down. In order to forget about these events, Ivy resumed recording sessions, and began incorporating influences from new wave. Member Adam Schlesinger detailed the album's exploration of different genres: "The first songs [we] recorded were jangly and simple and straight-ahead. We started gravitating toward the groovier, slightly more melancholy stuff. It works well with Dominique's voice."

According to Schlesinger, Ivy then signed with Nettwerk because "their roster was similar to Ivy across the board". After being released prematurely in Japan on November 8, 2000, the album was a quick success. Nettwerk's head of marketing, Marie Scheibert, stated that Long Distance became one of Amazon.com's top imports. The album was released in the United States on July 10, 2001, eight months later. During recording sessions, Durand, Schlesinger and fellow band member Andy Chase decided "to go one hundred percent" on one of the tracks, which would later become "Edge of the Ocean". Ivy stated that the song, which would later be released as the album's third single, was created in hopes that it would "mean the difference between making our next album or not". Along with "Edge of the Ocean", the trio started writing songs that were "less atmospheric" than those on Apartment Life, but contained more "infectious melodies", which the band preferred.

== Composition ==
Long Distance opens with "Undertow", a track featuring "pastoral tones" layered with "a lifting guitar frame"; Tom Topkoff of Hybrid Magazine noted that Durand's vocals have "aged like a fine wine". The single "Disappointed", the "fast-paced" second track, consists of a "taut rhythm and slinky guitars" that "provide a sleekly sexy backdrop for Durand's wistful vocals". Its sound was compared to Ivy's previous tracks on Realistic (1995) and Apartment Life (1997), particularly the songs "No Guarantee" and "I Get the Message". The next song, "Edge of the Ocean", is an indie pop and trip hop song, and has been called a "captivating and escapist tune". Since its release, it has been commonly referred to as one of Ivy's signature songs, including by Ivy themselves. "Blame It on Yourself" is a "memorable" track, with instrumentation provided by distorted guitars. The fifth track, "While We're in Love", is a trip hop-inspired track, with the singer and her partner realizing, "We know it won't last forever / Because we're not meant to be together". "While We're in Love" uses keyboards that add a groovy feeling to "fill out the sound more than ever before".

The album's lead single, "Lucy Doesn't Love You", uses 1960s-style horns with "jangly guitars" to reintroduce Ivy's signature indie pop style into the album. It has a "sassy brass and lifting melody," accompanied by electric guitars to create an "atmospheric" mood. According to Tom Topkoff of Hybrid Magazine, "Worry About You" is Ivy's "furthest departure from their tried and true practice". The composition is relatively ambient, with "Portishead styled ethereal-dub characteristics". "Let's Stay Inside", the album's eighth song, uses keyboard and acoustic guitar instrumentation to provide a "comforting" feeling; "bossa nova-tinged", it results in an "intimate approach". "Midnight Sun" and "I Think of You" both use violins and organs to achieve a sense of effortlessness. The violins are headed by Ivy's longtime partner James Iha.

The next track, "Hideaway", is another "escapist tune", featuring "Durand's sensually emotive vocals". The album's 12th track, "One More Last Kiss", contains longing lyrics discussing Durand's final moments with a lover. Its composition consists of guitar passages similar to the majority of those on the album. A cover of The Blow Monkeys' "Digging Your Scene" concludes the standard edition of the album, with its production sounding "natural", as if it was an original Ivy track.

== Promotion ==
While Ivy did not heavily promote the album through live appearances, several tracks from Long Distance were featured in various television series and films. "Edge of the Ocean" was used in the movies Angel Eyes, Music and Lyrics and Shallow Hal, and the television series Grey's Anatomy and Veronica Mars. "Worry About You" served as the theme song for the ABC drama series Kingdom Hospital, and was featured on the CBS sci-fi series The 4400, and its soundtrack. "Lucy Doesn't Love You" was played in the similarly titled 2002 film I'm with Lucy, while "One More Last Kiss" was in the 2002 movie Insomnia.

"Digging Your Scene" was released as a radio single and sent to modern rock radio stations in June 2001. In 2002, the single received a proper release to promote Ivy's fourth studio album, Guestroom. Ivy visited various record stores throughout the US and Japan to promote the album, including at Sam Goody locations and in the West Village in New York City. Ivy's touring schedule coincided with the re-released version of Apartment Life, on September 18, 2001.

=== Singles ===
Ivy released four singles from Long Distance. In late 2000, "Lucy Doesn't Love You" was released as the album's lead single. Two CD singles were issued in Japan, the first contained B-side track "Blame It on Yourself", while the second additionally contained "Digging Your Scene". The track received favorable reviews from critics, and a music video was filmed in 2000 to promote the song. The album's second single, "Disappointed", was released as a radio single on July 10, 2001. Similarly, the track received positive feedback, and was promoted by a live performance on Late Night with Conan O'Brien in 2001.

Third single "Edge of the Ocean" was also released on July 10, 2001, in the US. Compared to their previous work, the single was both a critical and commercial success, appearing in several television series and films, and peaking at No. 160 on the UK Singles Chart. Its accompanying music video became Ivy's most-watched clip on the video-sharing website YouTube.

== Critical reception ==
Professional ratings
Aggregate scores
| Source | Rating |
|---|---|
| Metacritic | 68/100 |
Review scores
| Source | Rating |
| AllMusic | 3/5 stars |
| Billboard | (Favorable) |
| Blender | 6/10 stars |
| City Pages | (Mixed) |
| Exclaim! | (Favorable) |
| Launch.com | 8/10 stars |
| PopMatters | 4/5 stars |
| Resonance | 8/10 stars |
| Rolling Stone | 3.5/5 stars |

Long Distance received positive reviews upon release. At Metacritic, which assigns a normalized rating out of 100 to reviews from mainstream critics, the album received an average score of 68, based on nine reviews. Jonathan Cohen of Billboard commented that "Durand's sensual vocals are beguiling as ever" and favored singles "Disappointed" and "Edge of the Ocean". A critic from Resonance magazine praised the album for "stay[ing] true to the belief that guitar pop can have cool, utopian sounds without bringing in a truckload of keyboards and sequencers". A Launch.com reviewer stated that "no one else stateside is currently making pop quite this lush and lovely," but disapproved of the track "Undertow" for being "short of perfection". One of E! Online's music critics declared "Lucy Doesn't Love You" a summer anthem and predicted that Long Distance would increase Ivy's popularity.

Critics from both Rolling Stone and Blender made strong comparisons between Long Distance and the English musical duo Everything but the Girl. The former stated that "any fan of Everything but the Girl, Saint Etienne or vintage Blondie should find plenty to swoon over", while the latter called the sound "cloudy and distant, [but it] takes tentative steps toward Everything but the Girl". In a more mixed review, a critic from SonicNet stated that "Ivy specialize[s] in nebulously oriented dream-pop: too ethereal for straight pop fans, too structured for the 4AD crowd." In a divided review, Michaelangelo Matos of City Pages noted that he preferred Ivy's previous releases, but stated, "If your band had spent four years getting dropped and picked up and dropped again by record labels, you'd sound tired too." Similarly, a reviewer from Alternative Press was negative, expressing that "the 13 tracks here are improbably edgeless, all love-me-do/love-me-don't plaints that evaporate on impact".

== Track listing ==
All tracks written by Ivy except "Digging Your Scene", written by Dr. Robert.

Long Distance – Standard edition
| No. | Title | Producer(s) | Length |
|---|---|---|---|
| 1. | "Undertow" | Adam Schlesinger; Andy Chase | 4:20 |
| 2. | "Disappointed" | Schlesinger; Chase; Peter Nashel | 4:24 |
| 3. | "Edge of the Ocean" | Schlesinger; Chase | 4:25 |
| 4. | "Blame It on Yourself" | Schlesinger; Chase | 4:05 |
| 5. | "While We're in Love" | Schlesinger; Chase | 4:36 |
| 6. | "Lucy Doesn't Love You" | Schlesinger; Chase | 3:57 |
| 7. | "Worry About You" | Schlesinger; Chase | 3:59 |
| 8. | "Let's Stay Inside" | Schlesinger; Chase | 4:20 |
| 9. | "Midnight Sun" | Schlesinger; Chase; Nashel | 5:27 |
| 10. | "I Think of You" | Schlesinger; Chase | 4:00 |
| 11. | "Hideaway" | Schlesinger; Chase | 4:09 |
| 12. | "One More Last Kiss" | Schlesinger; Chase | 4:51 |
| 13. | "Digging Your Scene" | Schlesinger; Chase | 3:40 |
| Total length: | | | 56:08 |

Long Distance – Japanese edition (bonus track)
| No. | Title | Producer(s) | Length |
|---|---|---|---|
| 14. | "It's All in Your Mind" | Schlesinger; Chase | 2:22 |
| Total length: | | | 58:30 |

Long Distance – 25th anniversary edition (bonus tracks)
| No. | Title | Producer(s) | Length |
|---|---|---|---|
| 14. | "All I Ever Wanted" | Lloyd Cole | 2:28 |
| 15. | "Edge of the Ocean" (Duotone remix) | Nashel | 4:35 |
| 16. | "Edge of the Ocean" (Original demo) | Nashel | 3:48 |
| Total length: | | | 66:59 |

== Personnel ==
Credits adapted from the album's liner notes.

Ivy

- Dominique Durand
- Adam Schlesinger
- Andy Chase

Additional musicians

- Eric Matthews – trumpet on tracks 1, 6, 8, 10
- Jon Skibic – guitar on track 9
- James Iha – guitar on track 9
- Brian Young – drums on tracks 4, 5
- Valerie Vigoda – violin on track 9
- Michael Hampton – additional loops and sounds
- Jeremy Freeman – additional loops and sounds

Technical

- Andy Chase – production, engineering, mixing
- Adam Schlesinger – production, mixing
- Geoff Sanoff – engineering assistance
- Pete Nashel – additional production on tracks 2, 9
- John Holbrook – additional mixing on tracks 5, 6, 7
- Vlado Meller – mastering

Design

- Frank Olinsky – art direction and design
- Phillippe Garcia – photography

== Release history ==
| Region | Date | Label | Ref. |
|---|---|---|---|
| Japan | November 8, 2000 | EastWest Japan | |
| United States | July 10, 2001 | Nettwerk America | |
| South Africa | July 10, 2001 | Bittersweet | |
| Spain | July 10, 2001 | Bittersweet | |
| Europe | July 10, 2001 | Nettwerk | |
