= All Hours =

Studio album by Ivy
- Released: September 20, 2011
- Recorded: 2011
- Studio: Stratosphere Sound (New York City)
- Genres: Electropop; indie pop; synth-pop
- Length: 42:46
- Label: Nettwerk
- Producers: Andy Chase; Adam Schlesinger

Ivy chronology
| In the Clear (2005) | All Hours (2011) | The Best of Ivy (2023) |

Singles from All Hours
- 1. "Distant Lights" Released: June 7, 2011; 2. "Fascinated" Released: July 26, 2011; 3. "Lost in the Sun" Released: April 10, 2012

All Hours is the sixth studio album by American band Ivy, released by Nettwerk on September 20, 2011. Following 2005's In the Clear, the members took a hiatus from music, allowing Andy Chase and Adam Schlesinger to work on side projects and Dominique Durand and Chase to begin raising a family. After reuniting in 2008, they started work on a project exploring a new sound following concerns that their songs would become obsolete and unimaginative due to their break. All Hours features 11 songs written and produced by Chase and Schlesinger; they take influence from electropop, indie pop and synth-pop music. Unlike their previous albums, All Hours experiments more with electronic music and contains tracks reminiscent of the music from the 1980s. It is the band’s final album featuring Schlesinger to be released in his lifetime and their last before their 13-year hiatus, which lasted from 2012 to 2025.

All Hours received mixed reviews from music critics; although several applauded Ivy for exploring a new sound, several of the songs on the album were described as boring and overly simple. "Distant Lights", "Fascinated" and "Lost in the Sun" were released as the album's three singles. The latter two songs were accompanied by music videos. In addition, a contest was held for fans to create a remix for "Lost in the Sun". All Hours became Ivy's first album to enter a record chart in the United States, where it peaked at No. 12 on Billboard's Dance/Electronic Albums chart and No. 25 on the Heatseekers Albums chart.

== Background and recording ==
In 2005, Ivy released In the Clear, their fifth studio album and second release from Nettwerk, followed by "I'll Be Near You", an original song recorded for the soundtrack to the 2005 American film Bee Season. Following the end of a promotional tour for In the Clear, the band members embarked on an extended hiatus to focus their time on other ventures; Dominique Durand and Andy Chase began a family together, Chase furthered work on his side project Brookville, and Adam Schlesinger recorded material for new albums with his band Fountains of Wayne. The group reunited briefly in 2008 and began work on a new record, even completing approximately 80 percent of the project. However, dissatisfied with the completed demos, Chase, Schlesinger and Durand decided to scrap the work altogether.

Afraid that Ivy would become "unrecognizable" and "boring", the group reunited again to work on what would later become All Hours. Determined to prove that an artist could work while simultaneously raising a family, Durand stated, "I really can't stand when I see musicians, great songwriters, and after having kids they become so boring, I talk about that all day. I don't need to talk about that in my songs," and concluded by claiming, "I need escape". Recording sessions took place during 2011 at Stratosphere Sound in Manhattan, New York. All Hours was released on September 20, 2011 by Ivy's record label, Nettwerk. A version of the album featuring 11 audio snippets of Durand discussing the curation of each track was uploaded to Nettwerk's official SoundCloud profile one day prior, on September 19.

== Music and sound ==
Compared to Ivy's previous releases, All Hours explores new sounds and genres; according to John Bergstrom, a writer for PopMatters, the album combines indie pop and synth-pop, in addition to being reminiscent of music from the 1980s. AllMusic's Matt Collar agreed, stating the album has a "stylish, early-'80s disco-meets-new wave vibe" and then said it heavily experiments with electronic music, whereas previous Ivy records only "flirted" with it. Chase and Schlesinger solely wrote and produced all of the 11 tracks that appear on All Hours. Chase noted that the album was different for them because it contains mainly "drum machines and synthesizers [and] almost no guitars"; he later referred to it as likely their "most rhythmic [and] danceable album" to date.

All Hours opens with lead single "Distant Lights". Influenced by house music, it follows a four-on-the-floor dance pattern and contains synthesizer sound effects. "Fascinated" and "How's Never" were described as flashbacks to "'80s synth pop" music. The former track has also been classified in the electronica genre, in contrast to the more "melodic guitar pop" vibe that was featured on their previous studio album, In the Clear, whereas the latter song contains "tough-love cliché" lyrics such as "We've got to find some time to get together / How's never?" "Suspicious" follows a steady rhythm accompanied by a "toy piano line". It contains a "synthesized" glockenspiel and handclaps, over Durand's "alluring" vocals. The album's fifth track, "World Without You", is a "European disco" song with string synths and an overall "moody" sound. "Make It So Hard" contains an acoustic guitar and sounds reminiscent of French pop music. According to Bergstrom, the track is comparable to the works of Swedish band Acid House Kings.

"I Still Want You" and "Everybody Knows" are the seventh and eighth songs on All Hours, respectively. According to Durand, the former track was created in hopes that a rap artist would sample the song's production and properly compensate Ivy; she later described "Everybody Knows" as the "most traditional Ivy song" on All Hours. "Lost in the Sun" is another track featuring acoustics. Track 10, "She Really Got to You", is an "upbeat tune [with] a sonic signature" that sounds like twee pop. Both "Lost in the Sun" and "She Really Got to You" were influenced by electronica music. The album closes with "The Conversation", which was first created by Schlesinger on his guitar while experimenting in the studio. Despite Chase and Schlesinger disliking the slowness and simpleness of the track, Durand pushed for its inclusion on All Hours.

== Singles ==
"Distant Lights" was released digitally as the lead single from All Hours on June 7, 2011. An extended play, featuring the album version of "Distant Lights" and two remixes created by Douze, was later distributed for digital download and streaming on January 30, 2012. The album's second single, "Fascinated", was released to digital retailers in the United States on July 26, 2011. An accompanying music video for "Fascinated" was released on October 25, 2011 via Nettwerk's official YouTube channel. It was directed by Schlesinger's close friend Adam Neustadter, who helped create a "colorful" and "vaguely disorienting clip" that corresponds with the song's "synth-pop vibe".

"Lost in the Sun" was released as the album's third and final single on April 10, 2012; in its digital form, it included a previously unreleased song – "We Try" – as a bonus track. A music video for "Lost in the Sun" was also created, featuring Durand lip-synching to the song while in a lounge near a beach. In addition to the release of the music video, Ivy held a contest for fans to submit their own remix of "Lost in the Sun" to be judged; the winner of the contest would receive $1,000 USD and a signed copy of All Hours, and have their remix released digitally. The remix created by Greek musician Dimitrios Bitzenis, under the name Dimitrios, won the competition.

A music video for "Suspicious" was filmed and directed by David Dutton, and eventually released in 2017.

== Reception ==
Professional ratings
Review scores
| Source | Rating |
|---|---|
| AllMusic | 3/5 stars |
| Creative Loafing | 3/5 stars |
| Consequence of Sound | D |
| PopMatters | 5/10 stars |

After its release, All Hours received mixed reviews from music critics. Several of them noted the album's musical departure from Ivy's older material. In Matt Collar's AllMusic review, he stated that the album "is not as warm or immediately enticing as much of Ivy's previous work", but commended the "detached electronica" feeling from songs "Fascinated", "Lost in the Sun" and "She Really Got to You". Shawn Connelly of Secret Sound Shop appreciated the "new sound" of the record, but considered it to be outdated when compared to current trends in the "indie electro-pop scene".

In a mixed review, Bergstrom from PopMatters criticized the songwriting on All Hours, calling Durand a "near-liability" on "flat-out boring songs". However, Bergstrom applauded the album for being "deceptively effortless", and Ivy for "trying something a bit different". Frank Mojica of Consequence of Sound disliked the album, calling it "ultimately forgettable", minus tracks "Distant Lights" and "Make It So Hard". Evan Tokarz, writing for Creative Loafing, claimed that "the album teeters between being impressive and frustratingly simple", but concluded that "there's something to be said for their subtlety"; Tokarz further praised "Suspicious" for "stand[ing] out most".

All Hours is Ivy's first and only effort to enter a record chart in the United States. It reached a peak at No. 25 on the Heatseekers Albums chart, which records the most successful albums by artists who haven't reached the top 100 positions of the Billboard 200 album chart. It also entered and peaked at No. 12 on Billboard's Dance/Electronic Albums chart.

== Track listing ==
All tracks written by Ivy and produced by Andy Chase and Adam Schlesinger.

All Hours track listing
| No. | Title | Length |
|---|---|---|
| 1. | "Distant Lights" | 5:23 |
| 2. | "Fascinated" | 4:21 |
| 3. | "How's Never" | 3:45 |
| 4. | "Suspicious" | 3:19 |
| 5. | "World Without You" | 4:32 |
| 6. | "Make It So Hard" | 2:42 |
| 7. | "I Still Want You" | 4:14 |
| 8. | "Everybody Knows" | 4:06 |
| 9. | "Lost in the Sun" | 3:27 |
| 10. | "She Really Got to You" | 3:52 |
| 11. | "The Conversation" | 3:05 |
| Total length: | | 42:46 |

== Credits and personnel ==
Credits adapted from the liner notes of All Hours and Ivy's discography on AllMusic.

- Andy Chase – engineering, executive producer, mixing
- Ruddy Cullers – engineering
- Bruce Driscoll – programming
- Dominique Durand – lead and background vocals
- Philippe Garcia – photography
- Josh Grier – legal advisor
- Brian Hill – art direction, design
- Ted Jensen – mastering
- Atsuo Matsumoto – assistant mixing
- Adam Schlesinger – engineering, executive producer, mixing

== Charts ==
Chart performance for All Hours
| Chart (2011) | Peak position |
|---|---|
| US Heatseekers Albums (Billboard) | 25 |
| US Top Dance Albums (Billboard) | 12 |

== Release history ==
Release dates and formats for All Hours
| Region | Date | Format(s) | Label | Ref. |
|---|---|---|---|---|
| Various | September 20, 2011 | Digital download; streaming | Nettwerk | |
| Europe | September 20, 2011 | CD | Nettwerk | |
| United States | September 20, 2011 | CD | Nettwerk | |
