= In the Clear =

Studio album by Ivy
- Released: March 1, 2005
- Recorded: 2004–05
- Studio: Stratosphere Sound
- Genre: Indie pop; indie rock
- Length: 43:22
- Label: Nettwerk
- Producer: Andy Chase; Adam Schlesinger; Steve Osborne

Ivy chronology
Guestroom (2002)	In the Clear (2005)	All Hours (2011)

Singles from In the Clear
- 1. "Thinking About You" Released: January 1, 2005

In the Clear is the fifth studio album by American band Ivy. It was released on March 1, 2005 in the United States by Nettwerk. Considered the "follow-up" to Ivy's third studio album Long Distance (2000), it continues the intimate and refined approach of modern indie pop and indie rock music. Band members Andy Chase and Adam Schlesinger produced the album, while musician Steve Osborne co-produced one of the album's tracks.

Like its predecessor, In the Clear received favorable reviews after its release, with some critics appreciating the dreamy and impressive production on the tracks. However, some critics found the songs to be less memorable compared to the material on Long Distance. Reviewers also made comparisons to other bands, including the Cardigans and Lush. One single was released from the album, "Thinking About You", on January 1, 2005. It was featured on the soundtracks of two films, and an animated music video for the track was released two months later.

Similar to Ivy's previous releases, the album failed to peak on any significant record chart. To promote the album, Ivy embarked on a spring tour in 2005, performing at several different nightclubs and restaurants in the United States and Canada; the tour lasted seven nights and spanned a month.

== Composition ==
According to several critics, In the Clear combines the musical directions of Apartment Life (1997) and Long Distance (2000). Jonathan Cohen from Billboard stated "The 10-track In the Clear blends the electronic-oriented sounds of 2001's Long Distance with the more guitar-driven leanings of Ivy's early albums".

=== Songs ===
In the Clear begins with "Nothing But the Sky", a "dreamy, piano-laden" track that proves the album is one that "breathes easy" but it also able to "strut in slow motion". Single "Thinking About You" recaptures the "catchy" and "winsome mood" of Ivy's previous works, with a string arrangement from Brazilian musician Zé Louis. Third track "Keep Moving" is an "emotional" composition with a "tasteful trumpet solo"; the song is also influenced by disco and soft rock. The sound of "Tess Don't Tell" sound was compared to the surge of a "trans-oceanic jet", and the song features a xylophone-laced, bouncy beat. Fifth track "Four in the Morning" is a "skin-tight" song, with Durand's "honeyed, warm vocals".

"Corners of Your Mind" is the album's sixth track, and has a "rush of rapidly-strummed guitars and pounding piano". The following song, "Clear My Head", continues the "spacier" sounds of In the Clear, and contains guitar playing from Ivy's longtime collaborator James Iha. "I've Got You Memorized" and "Ocean City Girl" both have "hypnotic" melodies, with the former being compared to The Cardigans' 1996 single "Lovefool", while the latter reinforces the guitar emphasis of the album. The trio's first collaboration, "Feel So Free", includes vocals from Girls Against Boys' singer Scott McCloud; the song includes the indie rock vibe that Ivy is known for. The iTunes and Japanese versions of In the Clear included bonus track "I Know My Way", while the latter edition also included the Sandbaggers remix of "I've Got You Memorized".

== Promotion ==
To promote In the Clear Ivy embarked on a seven-city tour during the spring of 2005. They performed at various spots in the United States, including one show in Canada; the tour opened on April 22, 2005, at the Bowery Ballroom in New York City, and concluded at the now-closed Richard's on Richards in Vancouver. Other places performed at included The Casbah in San Diego, the Troubadour in West Hollywood, Slim's in San Francisco, Doug Fir Lounge in Portland and the Crocodile Cafe in Seattle.

One single was released from In the Clear. "Thinking About You" was released on January 1, 2005, two months prior to the album's release. It was included on the soundtrack for two movies: Fever Pitch (Original Motion Picture Soundtrack) and Monster-in-Law (Music from the Motion Picture), both in 2005. An animated music video for the single revolving around insects was released on March 11, 2005. Furthermore, "Nothing but the Sky" was featured on the Nettwerk compilation album Chillout 06/The Ultimate Chillout which was released on February 15, 2005.

== Critical reception ==
Professional ratings
Aggregate scores
Source	Rating
Metacritic	73/100
Review scores
Source	Rating
AllMusic	4/5 stars
The A.V. Club	(Favorable)
Entertainment Weekly	B
Pitchfork	6.5/10
PopMatters	6/10 stars
Prefix Magazine	5/10 stars

In the Clear received generally favorable reviews upon release. At Metacritic, which assigns a normalized rating out of 100 to reviews from mainstream critics, the album received an average score of 73, based on 16 reviews. MacKenzie Wilson of AllMusic called it "most definitely an impressive culmination of Ivy's career to date"; Wilson also praised the "seductive" vocals on tracks "Four in the Morning", "Keep Moving" and "Tess Don't Tell". Noel Murray, writing for The A.V. Club, appreciated that In the Clear "le[ft] listeners refreshed and surprisingly un-mussed". Vickie Gilmer and Ira Robbins of Trouser Press favored the "refreshing" effect of the songs, claiming that several songs were similar to the band's 1997 single "The Best Thing".

In a more mixed review, Stephen M. Deusner of Pitchfork found the songs to be too unmemorable, claiming that "each song exists only when it's playing"; however, he appreciated the "aerodynamic" and "matureness" of the album. In Michael Mikesell's PopMatters review, he found the tracks to be comparable with the works of the Cardigans, Pizzicato Five, Cocteau Twins and Lush; Mikesell praised Schlesinger's bass playing, but favored the tracks produced by Chase and Schlesinger to Osborne's. Michael Pelusi of Prefix Magazine enjoyed In the Clear but found that Ivy could be "capable of so much more".

== Track listing ==
All tracks written by Ivy and produced by Chase and Schlesinger, except "Nothing but the Sky" and "Four in the Morning", which were both also produced by Steve Osborne.

In the Clear – Standard edition
No.	Title	Length
1.	"Nothing but the Sky"	5:12
2.	"Thinking About You"	4:13
3.	"Keep Moving"	4:43
4.	"Tess Don't Tell"	4:35
5.	"Four in the Morning"	5:10
6.	"Corners of Your Mind"	2:49
7.	"Clear My Head"	3:30
8.	"I've Got You Memorized"	3:48
9.	"Ocean City Girl"	4:24
10.	"Feel So Free" (featuring Scott McCloud)	4:58
Total length:		43:22

In the Clear – iTunes edition (bonus track)
No.	Title	Length
11.	"I Know My Way"	2:34
Total length:		45:56

In the Clear – Japanese edition (bonus tracks)
No.	Title	Length
11.	"I Know My Way"	2:34
12.	"I've Got You Memorized" (The Sandbaggers Remix)	3:44
Total length:		49:40

== Release history ==
List of release dates, formats, label, editions and reference
Location	Date	Format(s)	Label(s)	Edition(s)	Ref.
United States	March 1, 2005	CD; digital download	Nettwerk	Standard	
Japan	March 1, 2005	CD; digital download	Nettwerk	Deluxe	
