= Seed Records =

Name of several record labels

Seed Records has been the name of multiple record labels.

== 1970s American label ==
Seed Records was a record label started in 1972 by Paul Clark, a musician involved in the Jesus music movement. The label ran until circa 1981, when he started Minstrel's Voyage Music. Seed Records was distributed by Word Records and ABC Records.

== 1990s American label ==
Seed Records was a short-lived American independent record label owned by Atlantic Records. The label has released music by artists such as Tumbleweed, Madder Rose, Inch, Leatherface, The Nightblooms, Ivy, Television Personalities, The Pooh Sticks, The Earthmen, and The Pastels.

== 2000s British label ==
A London-based record label also named Seed Records was set up in 2000 by Rich Bevan and Joshu Doherty of electronica duo Posthuman. The original roster of artists who released music on Seed included Cursor Miner, Ardisson, Kansas City Prophets, The Doubtful Guest, Digitonal, and Posthuman.

Posthuman also promoted a series of events called 'Seed Showcases', including UnderLondonGround, held in the disused underground Aldwych tube station. Artists that played these events included the label's roster, alongside guests such as Aphex Twin, Alison Goldfrapp, Richard X, Plaid, Luke Vibert, T.Rauschmeire, Funkstörung, Mark Moore and many more.

There is no 13th release in the label catalogue.

The 14th release '1.21 Gigawatts' by MoQ was removed from the catalogue before physical release, and released instead as digital only SEEDEX04. It was later removed from sale entirely.

In 2006, for the label's official fifth birthday a series of limited edition CD releases sealed in bags with promotional items was released.

Doherty left Seed in late 2006, turning over control to Bruce McClure, who had been involved with the label and live events for several years.

In 2011, Seed released Sleeps in Oysters second album, 'Lo!'. The first fifty editions came with animal masks and sewing kits.

In 2012, Seed distributed the final album of the legendary Japanese games music producer Kazuki Sakata.

In 2012, 'Hot Doctor' by The Dagger Brothers was released with remixes by Nightwave and Sleeps in Oysters. The special editions came with a 'Singalong a Dagger Brothers' song sheet.

In 2013, The Dagger Brothers' album 'Bwananapple' was released as a limited-edition USB, with songs about Bruce Willis and a lyric sheet. It also included the 'Beast Tour 2009' rockumentary filmed at the Edinburgh Fringe in 2012.

In 2015, Seed put out a limited edition of one hundred 10" vinyl by Rutger Hauser and Eftus Spectun. This was a joint release with The Lumen Lake and Void of Ovals, and was the final release on the label.

Many of the Seed Records releases are highly limited in number and sought after by collectors.

The main genres covered are electronica, techno, post-rock, and IDM.

An A-Z of artists who have released music with Seed Records:

- [snyzch]
- 65daysofstatic
- 8Bitch, aka (Nightwave)
- Alexander Robotnick
- Andreas Tilliander
- Antoni Maiovvi
- Ardisson
- Arthur Mittens
- Bauri
- Black E (Cristian Vogel and Ben Mallot)
- Capracara
- Cold Fusion Mafia
- Company Fuck
- Cursor Miner
- Dave Tarrida
- dDamage
- Debasser
- Derehctub
- Dethscalator
- Digitonal
- Dressed in Wires
- Eftus Spectun
- Eyes
- Frenchbloke & Son
- Goodiepal
- Janos Andersson
- Jaques Leuder
- Jazzfinger
- Kansas City Prophets
- Kazuki Sakata
- Le Couteau Jaune
- Legowelt
- LJ Kruzer
- Ludvig Elbaus
- Machars Action
- Mark Verbos
- Mary and Polly
- Matkore
- Milanese
- Mokira
- MoQ
- Neil Landstrumm
- Ola Bergman
- On/Off
- Peachfish
- Plaid
- Posthuman
- Redcell
- Reels
- Romvelope
- Rutger Hauser
- Sancho
- Skitanja
- Sleeps in Oysters
- Snakefork
- Standard Planets
- Stendec
- The Cold Hand
- The Dagger Brothers
- The Doubtful Guest
- The Exgirlfriends
- The Night Terrors
- The Shepardtones
- The Video Age
- Tobias Schmidt
- Unit Black Flight
- Woody McBride
- Yard
- Zombi

=== Discography ===
The following is a list of physical releases from Seed Records. A number of download-only releases were also made available from the label, some via password on the official site, others on their Bleep.com page.

Artist	Title	Format	Catalog number	Year	Notes
Posthuman	Posthuman (grey album)	CD	n/a	2000	hand-made sleeve, limited edition
Posthuman	The Uncertainty of the Monkey	Double 12" vinyl, CD	SEEDCD/LP01	2001	
Posthuman	Posthuman EP	12" vinyl, CD	SEEDEP02	2002	A limited-edition CD, cat. SEEDCD02B was released featuring a different track listing
Ardisson	Ardisson EP	12" vinyl	SEEDEP03	2002	
On / Off	Distant Personal	CD	SEEDCD04	2002	Limited to 100 copies
Ardisson	Hardware Handshake EP	12" vinyl	SEEDEP05	2003	
Various Artists	Seed Records Volume 1	CD	SEEDCD06	2003	
[snyzch]	Seed 707	7" vinyl	SEED707	2003	Limited to 300 copies
Posthuman	Lagrange Point	CD	SEEDCD09	2003	
Digitonal	The Centre Cannot Hold EP	12" vinyl, CD	SEEDCD/EP10	2004	
Vlad & Ardisson / Kansas City Prophets	Split	12" vinyl	SEED1208	2005	
The House Husbands	The House Husbands Say...	7" vinyl	HH01	2005	Limited to 300 copies
Various Artists	Seed 5x5/1	CD	SEED5X5/1	2006	Limited to 100 copies. Released in sealed bag with branded aluminium bottle opener.
Various Artists	Seed 5x5/2	CD	SEED5X5/2	2006	Limited to 100 copies. Released in sealed bag with branded DJ clip-torch.
Various Artists	Seed 5x5/3	CD	SEED5X5/3	2006	Limited to 100 copies. Released in sealed bag with extra Digitonal CD "SEED5X5/LIVE".
Various Artists	Seed 5x5/4	CD	SEED5X5/1	2006	Limited to 100 copies. Released in sealed bag with signed photo by Mike Golding of B12.
Various Artists	Seed 5x5/5	CD	SEED5X5/5	2006	Limited to 100 copies. Released in sealed bag with branded metal lighter.
Posthuman	The People's Republic	CD	SEEDCD12	2006	
Sancho	Mystery Year	CD	SEEDCD11	2007	Enhanced CD, contains music video for "As Light Shone, they Fled"
Cursor Miner	Suicide Bomber	7" vinyl	SEED737	2007	Limited to 300 copies
Various Artists	Seed Records Volume 2	CD	SEEDCD15	2008	
Sleeps in Oysters	We kept the memories locked away like the beetles of our childhood, Or how to appreciate someone who is always around	CD	SEEDCD16	2008	Limited to 250 copies each with individually hand made embroidered sleeves, sealed with wax and hand numbered
Antoni Maiovvi	Electro Muscle Cult	CD	SEEDCD17	2008	Limited to 100 hand-numbered copies
Eyes	Night Eyes	CD	SEEDCD18	2009	Limited to 500 hand-numbered copies
Antoni Maiovvi	Shadow of the Bloodstained Kiss	CD	SEEDCD20	2009	Limited to 300 hand-numbered copies
Various	Seed X Part I	CD	SEEDCD21	2010	Limited to 100 hand-numbered copies
Various	Seed X Part II	CD	SEEDCD22	2010	Limited to 100 hand-numbered copies
Various	Seed X Part III	CD	SEEDCD23	2010	Limited to 100 hand-numbered copies
Skitanja	Zombie Tonic	CD	SEEDCD19	2010	Limited to 200 hand-numbered copies
The Dagger Brothers	Space Trumpet	CD	SEEDCD24	2010	Limited to 200 copies
8Bitch	Equinox	12" vinyl	SEEDEP25	2010	Limited to 250 hand-numbered copies
Frenchbloke & Son	Société de Radiodiffusion de l'homme et du fils Français – Bruit dans l'intérêt de Musique	Cassette tape / USB	SEED26	2010	Limited to 49 hand-numbered cassettes (10 encased in books) and 15 USB sets
Sleeps in Oysters	The Brambles in Starlight	3" CD	SEEDEP27	2010	Limited to 150 hand-numbered copies in hand spun wool
Sleeps in Oysters	Lo!	CD	SEEDCD28	2011	Limited to 300 hand-numbered copies worldwide. 1-50 deluxe editions of these come with animal masks and sewing kits.
Antoni Maiovvi	Battlestar Transreplica / Trial By Bullet	2 x CD	SEEDCD29 / SEEDCD30	2011	Limited to 200 hand-numbered copies. Editions 1-50/200 come with ltd edition t-shirt designed by African Apparel
The Dagger Brothers	Hot Doctor	CD	SEEDCD31	2012	Limited to 150 hand-numbered copies worldwide. 1-50 special editions come with signed 'Singalong' sheet.
The Cold Hand	Paperships	CD	SEEDCD32	2012	Limited to 100 hand-numbered copies worldwide.
Sleeps in Oysters	Don't Drum For Other Girls	CD	SEEDCD33	2012	Multi-media package.
The Night Terrors	Monster / Lasers For Eyes	CD	SEEDCD34	2012	Edition of 100. Includes remixes from Ash Wednesday and Antoni Maiovvi
Kazuki Sakata	Sport	WAV/MP3	SEED35	2012	Digital only
The Dagger Brothers	Bwananapple	USB	SEED36	2013	USB stick with film
Eftus Spectun / Rutger Hauser		10" vinyl	SEED37	2015	Limited to 100 copies worldwide.
