= Ivy (band) =

American indie pop band

- Origin: New York City, United States
- Genres: Indie pop; indie rock; dream pop
- Works: Albums and singles; songs
- Years active: 1994–2012; 2025–present
- Labels: Seed; Unfiltered; Atlantic; 550; Nettwerk; EastWest; Minty Fresh; Bar/None
- Members: Dominique Durand: Andy Chase; Bruce Driscoll
- Past members: Adam Schlesinger
- Website: thebandivy.com

Ivy is an American indie pop band founded by Andy Chase, Adam Schlesinger, and Dominique Durand. They were active between 1994 and 2012, and again in 2025.

== History ==
=== Formation and debut projects ===
In 1991, Andy Chase placed an ad that attracted fellow multi-instrumentalist Adam Schlesinger. In 1994, they met Dominique Durand, a native of Paris who had moved to New York City to study English, and with whom they shared admiration for the Go-Betweens, the House of Love, the Pastels, Prefab Sprout and the Smiths. Although Durand had never sung in a group, she was persuaded by Chase and Schlesinger to sing on some demos, and Ivy was formed.

In 1994, Ivy signed with Seed Records and released "Get Enough," which the UK magazine Melody Maker named Single of the Week, followed by the EP Lately. In 1995, they released their first full-length album, Realistic. Lately's cover version of "I Guess I'm Just a Little Too Sensitive" impressed its author, Edwyn Collins of Orange Juice, so much that he invited them to tour together. Ivy also toured during this period with Lloyd Cole, Madder Rose, and Saint Etienne.

=== Apartment Life ===
Apartment Life (released October 6, 1997, on Atlantic Records) was praised by critics as one of the year's best albums and established Ivy as a band that wrote pleasant, well-crafted pop songs. They were assisted by several guest musicians, including Lloyd Cole, James Iha, Dean Wareham and Chris Botti. The album received more attention when "This Is the Day" and "I Get the Message" appeared on the soundtrack for the movie There's Something About Mary.

Apartment Life, however, did not produce any hits, and Ivy was dropped by Atlantic. They signed with 550 Music on the condition that the band reissue the album. According to Schlesinger, four of the songs were remixed and the album was remastered and re-released on October 7, 1998.

=== Long Distance ===
Long Distance, their third LP, was released on July 10, 2001, on Nettwerk, and won the group a wider audience both at home and abroad. The album was released on November 8, 2000, in Japan, seven months prior to its US release, and the Japanese edition included a bonus track, "It's All in Your Mind" (the US version included The Blow Monkeys cover "Digging Your Scene" as a bonus track instead).

On Long Distance, lush soundscapes and dense rhythm tracks were brought to the fore, and bouncy pop songs were outnumbered by moodier, more atmospheric songs like single "Edge of the Ocean". Promotional videos were created for that song and the lead single, "Lucy Doesn't Love You".

By this time, the band had also found success on both the big and small screens, scoring the Farrelly Brothers’ Shallow Hal, as well as having their songs featured prominently in numerous films and television shows. Chase and Schlesinger had also begun to receive attention for their work outside the band: Chase produced the debut album by French pop group Tahiti 80, which was a hit in many countries and led to production work with several other groups; Schlesinger’s other band, Fountains of Wayne, released two critically acclaimed records, and he also received an Oscar nomination for his title song to Tom Hanks's film That Thing You Do!.

=== Guestroom ===
Ivy released Guestroom on September 10, 2002, on the Minty Fresh label. The album contained 10 of the group's favorite cover songs, including The Cure's "Let's Go to Bed", House of Love's "I Don't Know Why I Love You", Steely Dan's "Only a Fool Would Say That", Serge Gainsbourg's "L'Anamour" (previously a B-side on the "I've Got a Feeling" single), The Ronettes' "Be My Baby" and Papas Fritas' "Say Goodbye". Picking from several different eras, they revealed some of their sources of inspiration, and also displayed their ability to reinterpret many different types of songs in their own distinct way. Five of the 10 songs on Guestroom were recorded during one group of sessions in New York. The remaining five tracks were recorded at different times over the course of Ivy's career, but were difficult to find, having been released only on limited-edition singles, compilations or soundtracks.

"Digging Your Scene" was also included on the album, and released in Japan and UK as a CD single. A video for "Let's Go to Bed" was shot, depicting Durand and Chase in their NYC apartment, later joined by Iha.

The Lately EP was reissued in 2003 on Unfiltered Records with the same track list as the original.

Ivy gained even wider recognition in 2003–2004 for their song "Worry About You", which was used as the theme song of the Stephen King series Kingdom Hospital and in the pilot episode of the television series The 4400.

=== In the Clear ===
In the Clear was released on March 1, 2005, on Nettwerk.

Ivy brought in UK producer Steve Osborne (New Order, Happy Mondays, Starsailor, Elbow) for his first-ever New York sessions to mix seven of the tracks.

In the Clear also featured guest appearances by friends like Iha, Porter, Brazilian string arranger Zé Luis (Bebel Gilberto, Caetano Veloso), and former Girls Against Boys frontman Scott McLoud, who dueted with Durand on the closing track, "Feel So Free".

The album was given a warmer reception than previous releases. An animated promotional video clip was created for "Thinking About You".

=== All Hours ===
All Hours was released on September 20, 2011, on Nettwerk. The first single from the album, "Distant Lights", was released on June 7, 2011, and the second single, "Fascinated," was released on July 26, 2011. The third and final single, "Lost in the Sun", was released on April 10, 2012. The making of All Hours was fraught due to Chase's personal issues which included substance abuse. On top of his personal issues, Chase was disinterested in the electronic-leaning direction that Schlesinger was pursuing. A scheduled tour to promote the album was cancelled after Durand confessed to Schlesinger that she didn't feel she could do it.

== Hiatus, reconnection and Adam Schlesinger's death ==
The cancelled All Hours tour led to Ivy's unannounced break up, while the deterioration of Chase and Schlesinger's relationship in between 2012 and 2014 led to the closure of their co-owned studio Stratosphere Sound and their estrangement for four years. At Durand's insistence, Chase and Schlesinger finally got together for a drink in late 2018 and repaired their friendship. In February 2020 while all three Ivy members were in Los Angeles with their children, Chase suggested making a new Ivy album to which Schlesinger responded positively. However, Schlesinger died from COVID-19 six weeks later.

=== Traces of You ===
Following Schlesinger's death and the expiration of Ivy's contract with Nettwerk, Chase and Durand decided to reunite with Mark Lipsitz who had helped launch Ivy's career and was now CEO of Bar/None Records. To bring proper closure to the band, Ivy planned to reissue their first three albums with unreleased bonus tracks at Lipsitz's request. While looking through their archives in search of those bonus tracks in 2021, Chase and Durand discovered plenty of unfinished material spanning their entire career. With the blessing of Schlesinger's family and estate, Chase and Durand began working on those songs with the help of Ivy's longtime touring keyboardist Bruce Driscoll while keeping it a secret from Lipsitz and Bar/None until they were certain that they had a new album.

Traces of You was released on September 5, 2025 with every track including contributions by Schlesinger using fragments and demos recorded between 1995 and 2012. The album contains ten of the 21 songs in total that the band finished, with the remainder to be released as a separate album in 2026. On November 11, 2025, Ivy announced their first shows in 15 years.

== Influences ==
Ivy have cited the Go-Betweens, Burt Bacharach, Antônio Carlos Jobim, Orange Juice, the Smiths, the Velvet Underground, the Beatles and Françoise Hardy as influences, as well as other artists covered on Guestroom.

Durand's vocal technique and Parisian pronunciation are often compared by reviewers to another French singer, Lætitia Sadier of Stereolab.

== Other work ==
Along with Fountains of Wayne, Schlesinger was a member of Tinted Windows.

Durand and Chase, with Michael Hampton, recorded one album, 2004's This Is Where We Live, as Paco.

Chase's solo project, Brookville, released three albums: Wonderfully Nothing (2003), Life in the Shade (2006) and Broken Lights (2009). In November 2012, Brookville changed their name to Camera2, releasing the "Just About Made It" single, followed by EP releases in 2013 and 2014.

In his video "How Music Should Sound," Rick Beato mentioned he played with the band for "about six weeks" in 1994.

== Discography ==
- Realistic (1995)
- Apartment Life (1997)
- Long Distance (2000)
- Guestroom (2002)
- In the Clear (2005)
- All Hours (2011)
- Traces of You (2025)

== Film and TV work ==
=== Film work ===
- There's Something About Mary (1998) – featured "This Is the Day" and "I Get the Message"
- The Rage: Carrie 2 – (1999) featured "Quick, Painless and Easy"
- Me, Myself & Irene (2000) – featured a cover of Steely Dan's "Only a Fool Would Say That"
- Angel Eyes (2001) – featured "Edge of the Ocean" on the official soundtrack
- Shallow Hal (2001) – featured a score by Ivy as well as "Edge of the Ocean" and "I Think of You"
- Orange County (2002) – featured "I've Got a Feeling"
- Insomnia (2002) – featured "One More Last Kiss"
- Before Sunset (2004) – featured "Edge of the Ocean"
- Bee Season (2005) – featured "I'll Be Near You"
- Numb (2007) – featured "Thinking about You" and "Edge of the Ocean"
- Shanghai Kiss (2007) – featured "Nothing But the Sky"
- Music and Lyrics (2007) – featured "Edge of the Ocean" during the end credits (Schlesinger also wrote three of the songs in the movie)

=== TV work ===
- Get Real – "I've Got a Feeling" was featured in the episode "Big Numbers"
- Alias – "Edge of the Ocean" was featured in the season 1 episode "Time Will Tell"
- Veronica Mars (UPN series) – "Edge of the Ocean" was featured in episodes "Meet John Smith" and "One Angry Veronica"; "Feel so Free" in "Clash of the Tritons"; and "Ocean City Girl" in "Ahoy, Mateys!"
- Roswell – "Undertow" was featured at the end of "Heart of Mine"; the band appeared as themselves in 2001 episode "To Have and to Hold" and performed "Edge of the Ocean"
- The 4400 – "Worry About You" was featured in the pilot episode
- Kingdom Hospital – "Worry About You" was used as the theme song
- Grey's Anatomy – "Edge of the Ocean" was featured in 2005 episode "Shake Your Groove Thing", and "Feel So Free" in 2005 episode "Raindrops Keep Falling on My Head"
- Pinoy Big Brother – Season 2 – "Worry About You" was featured in multiple episodes
- LAX – "Nothing But the Sky" was featured in the final episode of the series
- Witchblade – "Undertow" was featured in season 1 episode "Legion"
- Sleeper Cell – "Undertow" was featured
- Felicity – "I've Got a Feeling" was featured in the pilot and first-season finale
- Senseo coffee makers featured "Edge of the Ocean" in a commercial
- No Good Nick (Netflix Original Series) - "Edge of the Ocean" was featured in the final episode as Nick's goodbye letter.
