= Adam Schlesinger =

American musician (1967–2020)

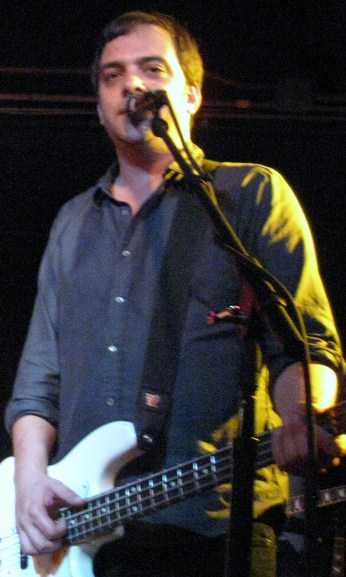
- Schlesinger performing in 2009
- Born: Adam Lyons Schlesinger; October 31, 1967; New York City, New York, U.S.
- Died: April 1, 2020 (aged 52) (Note: News sources reported that Schlesinger died early on April 1, 2020, at a hospital in Poughkeepsie, New York. However, local health authorities had been publicly announcing deaths from COVID-19 at the time, and report only the death of a 52-year-old male in a Poughkeepsie hospital on March 31.); Poughkeepsie, New York, U.S.
- Cause of death: Complications from COVID-19
- Education: Williams College
- Occupations: Musician; songwriter; composer; record producer
- Years active: 1989–2020
- Spouse: Katherine Michel (m. 1999; div. 2013)
- Children: 2
- Relatives: Jon Bernthal (cousin); Tom Bernthal (cousin); Murray Bernthal (grandfather)
- Awards: Primetime Emmy Award for Outstanding Original Music and Lyrics (2012, 2013, 2019)
- Musical career
- Genres: Power pop; alternative rock
- Instruments: Bass guitar; keyboards; guitar; drums; vocals
- Formerly of: Fountains of Wayne; Tinted Windows; Ivy; Fever High

Adam Lyons Schlesinger (October 31, 1967 – April 1, 2020) was an American musician, songwriter, composer, and record producer. He was a founding member of the bands Fountains of Wayne, Ivy, and Tinted Windows, and was a member of the band Fever High. He also wrote songs for television and film, for which he won three Emmy Awards, a Grammy Award, and the ASCAP Pop Music Award, and was nominated for Academy, Tony, and Golden Globe Award. He died of complications from COVID-19 at age 52.

== Early life ==
Schlesinger was born in New York City on October 31, 1967, to publicist Barbara (née Bernthal) and Stephen Schlesinger. He was a cousin of actor Jon Bernthal and a grandson of musician Murray Bernthal. He was raised in a secular Jewish family in the Manhattan borough of New York City and Montclair, New Jersey, attending Montclair High School in the latter. He received a Bachelor of Arts in philosophy from Williams College in Williamstown, Massachusetts.

== Songwriting ==
=== Film ===
In addition to writing and co-producing the title song to That Thing You Do!, Schlesinger composed "Master of the Seas" for Ice Age: Continental Drift, performed by Jennifer Lopez, Peter Dinklage and others. He wrote and produced three songs for Music and Lyrics, and his music has also been featured in films such as Shallow Hal (which he scored with Ivy); Robots; There's Something About Mary; Me, Myself & Irene; Josie and the Pussycats; Scary Movie; Art School Confidential; Fever Pitch; The Manchurian Candidate; Because of Winn-Dixie; Orange County; Two Weeks Notice; and others.

=== In theatre ===
Schlesinger and The Daily Show executive producer David Javerbaum co-wrote the songs for the musical theater adaptation of the John Waters film Cry-Baby. Cry-Baby debuted at the La Jolla Playhouse in La Jolla, California in November 2007. Previews for the Broadway run began at the Marquis Theatre on March 15, 2008. Its official opening night was April 24, 2008.

Schlesinger and Javerbaum co-wrote the closing song "I Have Faith in You" for Javerbaum's play An Act of God, which opened on Broadway on May 28, 2015. The song is performed by Jim Parsons, Chris Fitzgerald, and Tim Kazurinsky.

Schlesinger and Sarah Silverman collaborated on a musical titled The Bedwetter, based on her book of the same name. The musical was set for previews to begin on May 9, 2020, at the Atlantic Theater Company's Linda Gross Theater; opening night was scheduled for Wednesday, June 10, 2020. The dates were later postponed due to the COVID-19 pandemic. The musical ultimately premiered in previews in April 2022. Prior to his death, Schlesinger had been working on the music for a stage adaption of the television series The Nanny.

=== In television ===
Schlesinger and Javerbaum co-wrote the opening number of the 2011 Tony Awards ceremony, "It's Not Just for Gays Anymore", as well as the opening and closing numbers of the 2012 Tony Awards, "What If Life Were More Like Theater" and "If I Had Time", all performed by Neil Patrick Harris. They wrote "TV Is a Vast Wonderland", the opening number of the 2011 Emmy Awards, performed by Jane Lynch, and "The Number in the Middle of the Show", performed at the 2013 Emmy Awards by Neil Patrick Harris, Sarah Silverman, and Nathan Fillion.

Schlesinger's television composing work includes theme music, songs, and/or score for I Love You, America (Hulu), The Maya Rudolph Show (NBC), A Colbert Christmas: The Greatest Gift of All!, the 2011 and 2012 Tony Awards, the 2011 and 2013 Emmy Awards, Big Time Rush, T.U.F.F. Puppy (Nickelodeon), Good Luck Charlie (Disney Channel), The Fresh Beat Band (Nickelodeon), Kathy (Bravo), Crank Yankers, Wedding Band (TBS), the Billboard Music Awards, Bubble Guppies (Nick Jr.), The Howard Stern Show, Sesame Street, Comedy Central's Night of Too Many Stars, Robert Smigel's cartoons for Saturday Night Live, The Disney Parks Christmas Day Parade with Neil Patrick Harris, The Comedy Awards (Comedy Central), American Dreams, Stephen King's Kingdom Hospital, The In-Laws, The Man Show, Supernoobs, Too Late with Adam Carolla, The Dana Carvey Show, House of Buggin', My Kind of Town, Johnny Test, and others. His songs have been licensed for use on numerous television series, including Scrubs, The Hills, Gossip Girl, Melrose Place, Felicity, Roswell, and others.

He wrote songs for and was executive music producer of the scripted comedy Crazy Ex-Girlfriend on The CW.

== Production work ==
As a record producer and mixer, he worked with The Monkees, Fever High, Dashboard Confessional, Swirl 360, Tahiti 80, Motion City Soundtrack, Verve Pipe, Robert Plant, America, the Sounds, They Might Be Giants, Fastball, and many other artists, as well as producing or co-producing five Fountains of Wayne albums and six Ivy albums.

== Side projects ==
Schlesinger was also in a side project band called Tinted Windows formed by guitarist James Iha, previously of The Smashing Pumpkins and A Perfect Circle, singer Taylor Hanson of Hanson, and Bun E. Carlos of Cheap Trick, and recorded and toured with them in 2009 and 2010. He also contributed to Iha's second solo album, Look to the Sky (2012).

He was the main composer and producer for Brooklyn-based synth-pop duo Fever High.

== Awards and nominations ==
Schlesinger was nominated in the 1997 Academy Awards and the 1997 Golden Globe Awards for writing the title track of the Tom Hanks film, That Thing You Do!, also contributing two other songs for the film.

Fountains of Wayne was nominated for two Grammy Awards in 2003 for Best New Artist and Best Pop Performance by a Duo or Group with Vocal for "Stacy's Mom".

Schlesinger and David Javerbaum received two nominations for the Tony Awards in 2008, Best Musical and Best Original Score, for the musical Cry-Baby. They also received a nomination for the Primetime Emmy Awards in 2009 for Outstanding Music and Lyrics for their song "Much Worse Things", performed by Elvis Costello and Stephen Colbert on the television special and album A Colbert Christmas: The Greatest Gift of All! The album, co-written by Schlesinger and Javerbaum, and co-produced by Schlesinger and Steven M. Gold, won the 2010 Grammy Award for Best Comedy Album.

Schlesinger received a Daytime Emmy Awards nomination at the 2013 Daytime Emmy Awards for Outstanding Original Song -- Children or Animation for his "Elmo the Musical Theme" for Sesame Street. He and Molly Boylan received a 2011 Daytime Emmy nomination for the song "I Wonder" from Sesame Street.

Schlesinger and Javerbaum received a 2012 Emmy Award for Outstanding Music And Lyrics for their song "It's Not Just for Gays Anymore", performed by Neil Patrick Harris as the opening number of the 65th Tony Awards telecast; and a 2013 Emmy Award for Outstanding Music And Lyrics for their song "If I Had Time", performed by Harris as the closing number of the 66th Tony Awards telecast.

Schlesinger received two 2016 Emmy nominations for his work on the CW series Crazy Ex-Girlfriend: Outstanding Original Music and Lyrics for "Settle for Me" (co-written with Rachel Bloom and Jack Dolgen), and Outstanding Main Title Theme (co-written with Rachel Bloom).

He received a 2017 Emmy nomination for Outstanding Original Music and Lyrics for "We Tapped That Ass" (co-written with Rachel Bloom and Jack Dolgen) from the CW series Crazy Ex-Girlfriend.

He won the 2019 Emmy Award for Outstanding Original Music and Lyrics for "Antidepressants Are So Not a Big Deal" and was nominated for Outstanding Original Main Title Theme Music for "Meet Rebecca" (Season 4 Theme) from Crazy Ex-Girlfriend (both co-written with Rachel Bloom and Jack Dolgen).

== Personal life ==
On January 30, 1999, Schlesinger married Katherine Michel, a graphic designer and Yale University graduate. They met in 1996 at WXOU Radio Bar, a bar that Schlesinger used to frequent with Fountains of Wayne co-founder Chris Collingwood as they were starting the band. They divorced in 2013. Schlesinger and Michel had two daughters.

== Death and tribute ==
On April 1, 2020, during the COVID-19 pandemic in the United States, it was announced that Schlesinger died of complications from COVID-19 at a hospital in Poughkeepsie, New York, at the age of 52, having been on a ventilator for over a week before his death.

On June 16, 2020, the tribute album Saving for a Custom Van was released in Schlesinger's memory on Father/Daughter Records. The title is a reference to the Fountains of Wayne song "Utopia Parkway". The 31-track album features covers of songs Schlesinger wrote or performed by artists such as Kay Hanley, Ben Lee, and Prince Daddy & the Hyena. His collaborator Rachel Bloom and his Fountains of Wayne bandmate Jody Porter also participated. All proceeds from the album were donated to the MusiCares COVID-19 relief fund.

Schlesinger's former bandmates in Tinted Windows briefly re-united in May 2021 to perform a livestream event in his memory.

Rachel Bloom, who was a close friend and worked with Schlesinger on Crazy Ex-Girlfriend, addressed his death and how the loss affected her in her 2024 Netflix special, Death, Let Me Do My Show.

== Discography ==
Fountains of Wayne

- Fountains of Wayne (1996)
- Utopia Parkway (1999)
- Welcome Interstate Managers (2003)
- Traffic and Weather (2007)
- Sky Full of Holes (2011)

Ivy

- Realistic (1995)
- Apartment Life (1997)
- Long Distance (2000)
- Guestroom (2002)
- In the Clear (2005)
- All Hours (2011)
- Traces of You (2025)

Tinted Windows

- Tinted Windows (2009)

Fever High

- All Work (2015)
- FHNY (2017)
