= Andy Chase =

American musician

- Born: Bethesda, Maryland, U.S.
- Genres: Indie rock, indie pop
- Occupation(s): Musician, songwriter, record producer, label owner
- Instrument(s): Keyboards, guitar
- Years active: 1990–present
- Labels: Unfiltered
- Website: www.andychase.com

Andy Chase is an American musician, record producer, and label owner. He formed the band Ivy with Adam Schlesinger of Fountains of Wayne and Dominique Durand, now his wife. Chase owns Unfiltered Records and co-owned Stratosphere Sound studio with Schlesinger and James Iha of the Smashing Pumpkins.

== Early life ==
Chase grew up in Bethesda, Maryland. He was a fan of pop and new wave acts in the 1980s such as the Smiths, Talk Talk, Blondie, and the Cars. At a portable home studio, he wrote music and played keyboards and guitar.

== Career ==
Eager to start a band, he moved to New York City in the 1990s and placed an ad in the Village Voice. He met multi-instrumentalist Adam Schlesinger, and in 1994, formed the band Ivy with Dominique Durand. He and Schlesinger co-produced, engineered, and sang on the title track for the Tom Hanks film That Thing You Do! in 1995. He also founded the bands Paco, Brookville, and Camera2.

Chase has served as composer, producer, engineer, mixer, and musician on each of his bands' (Ivy, Brookville, Paco) albums.

He established Unfiltered Records in 2003, re-released Ivy's catalog, and produced albums for his side projects, Paco and Brookville. He also produced albums for acts he signed to his label, such as the Postmarks and Ukrainian singer Lana Mir. In 2009, he produced and performed on Juliana Hatfield's album How to Walk Away. He has also produced albums for the Smashing Pumpkins, Tahiti 80, the Trash Can Sinatras, and Fountains of Wayne. He owned Stratosphere Sound recording studios with Adam Schelsinger and James Iha.

Films and television shows that feature Chase's songs include There's Something About Mary, Me Myself & Irene, Shallow Hal, Orange County, Insomnia, Stuck on You, Fever Pitch, Bee Season, and Music and Lyrics. He has composed original music for film and TV, and voice acted for the video game Kya: Dark Lineage.

== Personal life ==
Chase is married to Dominique Durand. They have two children: a daughter and a son.
