= The Blow Monkeys discography =

the Blow Monkeys discography
- Studio albums: 12
- Live albums: 1
- Compilation albums: 11
- Singles: 36
- Video albums: 3
- Music videos: 12

This article is the discography of British pop band the Blow Monkeys. Also included is the solo discography of frontman Dr. Robert.

== Albums ==
=== Studio albums ===
Year	Title	Details	Peak chart positions							
Year	Title	Details	UK	AUS	CAN	GER	NL	NZ	SWE	US
1984	Limping for a Generation	Released: October 1984; Label: RCA	—	—	—	—	—	—	—	—
1986	Animal Magic	Released: 7 April 1986; Label: RCA	21	54	72	50	47	23	25	35
1987	She Was Only a Grocer's Daughter	Released: 5 January 1987; Label: RCA	20	—	65	30	65	15	29	134
1989	Whoops! There Goes the Neighbourhood	Released: 30 January 1989; Label: RCA	46	—	—	64	—	49	—	—
1990	Springtime for the World	Released: 25 June 1990; Label: RCA	—	—	—	—	—	—	—	—
2008	Devil's Tavern	Released: 8 September 2008; Label: Blow Monkey Music	—	—	—	—	—	—	—	—
2011	Staring at the Sea	Released: 14 February 2011; Label: Blow Monkey Music	—	—	—	—	—	—	—	—
2013	Feels Like a New Morning	Released: 7 May 2013; Label: Blow Monkey Music	—	—	—	—	—	—	—	—
2015	If Not Now, When?	Released: 6 April 2015; Label: Blow Monkey Music	—	—	—	—	—	—	—	—
2017	The Wild River	Released: 6 October 2017; Label: Monks Road	—	—	—	—	—	—	—	—
2021	Journey to You	Released: 24 September 2021; Label: Blow Monkey Music	—	—	—	—	—	—	—	—
2025	Birdsong	Released: 15 August 2025; Label: Creation Youth	—	—	—	—	—	—	—	—
"—" denotes releases that did not chart or were not released

=== Live albums ===
Year	Title	Details
2009	Travelin' Souls – Live! at the Legendary 100 Club	Released: 2009; Label: Blow Monkey Music; Limited edition CD & DVD

=== Compilation albums ===
Year	Title	Details	Peak chart positions
Year	Title	Details	UK
1989	Choices – The Singles Collection	Released: 7 August 1989; Label: RCA	5
1994	The Best of Blow Monkeys	Released: 1994; Label: BMG	—
1996	For the Record...	Released: 1996; Label: Camden	—
1997	The Masters	Released: 1997; Label: Eagle	—
1999	Atomic Lullabies – Very Best of The Blow Monkeys	Released: September 1999; Label: Camden	—
2000	Complete Singles	Released: 21 April 2000; Label: BMG; Japan-only release	—
2000	Rare & Unreleased	Released: 21 April 2000; Label: BMG; Japan-only release	—
2000	Digging Your Scene	Released: November 2000; Label: Armoury	—
2008	Digging Your Scene: The Best of The Blow Monkeys	Released: 4 February 2008; Label: Music Club	—
2013	Halfway to Heaven: The Best of The Blow Monkeys and Dr Robert	Released: 14 June 2013; Label: Sony Music	—
2016	The Very Best of The Blow Monkeys	Released: 8 April 2016; Label: Metro Select	—
"—" denotes releases that did not chart or were not released

== Singles ==
Year	Single	Peak chart positions											Album
Year	Single	UK	AUS	BE	CAN	FIN	GER	IRE	NL	NZ	US	US Dance	Album
1982	"Live Today Love Tomorrow"	—	—	—	—	—	—	—	—	—	—	—	Non-album single
1984	"Go Public!"	—	—	—	—	—	—	—	—	—	—	—	Limping for a Generation
1984	"The Man from Russia"	—	—	—	—	—	—	—	—	—	—	—	Limping for a Generation
1984	"Atomic Lullaby"	—	—	—	—	—	—	—	—	—	—	—	Limping for a Generation
1985	"Wildflower"	—	—	—	—	—	—	—	50	—	—	—	Limping for a Generation
1985	"Forbidden Fruit"	94	—	—	—	—	—	—	—	—	—	—	Animal Magic
1985	"Sweet Murder (The Smile on Her Face)" (US-only release)	—	—	—	—	—	—	—	—	—	—	—	Animal Magic
1986	"Digging Your Scene"	12	16	23	19	—	25	9	23	10	14	7	Animal Magic
1986	"Wicked Ways"	60	—	—	—	—	—	—	—	47	—	—	Animal Magic
1986	"Don't Be Scared of Me"	77	—	—	—	—	—	—	—	—	—	—	Animal Magic
1987	"It Doesn't Have to Be This Way"	5	82	—	92	18	—	6	30	6	—	—	She Was Only a Grocer's Daughter
1987	"Out with Her"	30	—	—	—	—	—	30	—	—	—	—	She Was Only a Grocer's Daughter
1987	"(Celebrate) The Day After You" (with Curtis Mayfield)	52	—	—	—	—	—	—	—	26	—	—	She Was Only a Grocer's Daughter
1987	"Some Kind of Wonderful"	67	—	—	—	—	—	—	—	—	—	—	She Was Only a Grocer's Daughter
1988	"This Is Your Life"	70	—	—	—	26	—	—	—	—	—	—	Whoops! There Goes the Neighbourhood
1988	"It Pays to Belong"	76	—	—	—	—	—	—	—	—	—	—	Whoops! There Goes the Neighbourhood
1989	"This Is Your Life" (remix)	32	—	—	—	—	—	—	—	—	—	—	Choices – The Singles Collection
1989	"Choice?" (featuring Sylvia Tella)	22	—	—	—	—	—	25	—	—	—	—	Choices – The Singles Collection
1989	"Slaves No More" (featuring Sylvia Tella)	73	—	—	—	—	—	—	—	—	—	—	Choices – The Singles Collection
1990	"Springtime for the World"	69	—	—	—	—	—	—	—	—	—	—	Springtime for the World
1990	"La Passionara" (featuring Quan-T & Berzerk)	—	—	—	—	—	—	—	—	—	—	—	Springtime for the World
1990	"If You Love Somebody"	—	—	—	—	—	—	—	—	—	—	—	Springtime for the World
2008	"The Bullet Train"	—	—	—	—	—	—	—	—	—	—	—	Devil's Tavern
2008	"Travelin' Soul"	—	—	—	—	—	—	—	—	—	—	—	Devil's Tavern
2011	"Steppin' Down"	—	—	—	—	—	—	—	—	—	—	—	Staring at the Sea
2011	"Hangin' On to the Hurt (Let It Go Now)"	—	—	—	—	—	—	—	—	—	—	—	Staring at the Sea
2013	"Oh My"	—	—	—	—	—	—	—	—	—	—	—	Feels Like a New Morning
2013	"Feels Like a New Morning"	—	—	—	—	—	—	—	—	—	—	—	Feels Like a New Morning
2013	"Shake It Off"	—	—	—	—	—	—	—	—	—	—	—	Feels Like a New Morning
2014	"Chained"	—	—	—	—	—	—	—	—	—	—	—	Feels Like a New Morning
2015	"OK! Have It Your Way"	—	—	—	—	—	—	—	—	—	—	—	If Not Now, When?
2015	"The Sound of Your Laughter"	—	—	—	—	—	—	—	—	—	—	—	If Not Now, When?
2017	"Crying for the Moon"	—	—	—	—	—	—	—	—	—	—	—	The Wild River
2017	"What in the World"	—	—	—	—	—	—	—	—	—	—	—	The Wild River
2017	"The Wild River"	—	—	—	—	—	—	—	—	—	—	—	The Wild River
2020	"Time Storm"	—	—	—	—	—	—	—	—	—	—	—	Journey to You
"—" denotes releases that did not chart or were not released

=== Other appearances ===
- Police Academy 4: Citizens on Patrol – "It Doesn't Have to Be This Way" (1987)
- Dirty Dancing – "You Don't Own Me" (1987)
- The Last Temptation of Elvis – "Follow That Dream" (1990)

== Videos ==
=== Video albums ===
Year	Title	Details
1986	Video Magic	Released: August 1986; Label: Hendring; Medium: VHS; Released in the US by Sony as Live from London; Live material filmed at Camden Palace in May 1985
1986	Digging Your Video	Released: 1986; Label: RCA; Medium: VHS; Collection of promo videos from Animal Magic; US-only release
1989	Choices: The Video Collection	Released: August 1989; Label: Hansa, BMG; Medium: VHS, LaserDisc; Accompaniment to the compilation album

=== Music videos ===
Year	Title	Director
1985	"Forbidden Fruit"	John Scarlett-Davis
1986	"Digging Your Scene"	Andy Morahan
1986	"Wicked Ways"	Andy Morahan
1986	"Don't Be Scared of Me"	
1987	"It Doesn't Have to Be This Way"	
1987	"Out with Her"	Andy Morahan
1987	"(Celebrate) The Day After You"	
1987	"Some Kind of Wonderful"	
1988	"This Is Your Life"	Mark Cecere
1988	"It Pays to Belong"	Julien Temple
1989	"Slaves No More"	
1990	"Springtime for the World"	

== Dr. Robert ==
=== Albums ===
==== Solo albums ====
- Realms of Gold (1994)
- Bethesda Part One (1995)
- Other Folk (1996)
- Flatlands (1999)
- Birds Gotta Fly (2001)
- Flutes and Bones (2012)
- Out There (2016)

==== Collaboration albums ====
- Five in the Afternoon (with P. P. Arnold) (2007)
- The Instant Garden (with Matt Deighton) (2023)

==== Live albums ====
- Live in Tokyo (2004)
- Acoustic Blow Monkeys (2012)

==== Compilation albums ====
- Keep on Digging for the Gold (2002)
- The Coming of Grace: An Introduction to Dr Robert (2009)

=== Singles ===
Year	Single	Peak chart positions				
Year	Single	UK	BE	GER	IRE	NL
1989	"Wait!" (with Kym Mazelle)	7	20	26	11	32
1991	"I've Learnt to Live with Love"	—	—	—	—	—
1992	"A Simpler Place and Time"	—	—	—	—	—
1995	"Circular Quay"	—	—	—	—	—
1996	"The Coming of Grace"	76	—	—	—	—
1996	"Pond Life"	—	—	—	—	—
1997	"Halfway to Heaven"	—	—	—	—	—
1999	"Staring Down the Bird"	—	—	—	—	—
1999	"Full Moon Fever" (Germany-only release)	—	—	—	—	—
2001	A Single Summer"	—	—	—	—	—
2001	"The Nearly Room"	—	—	—	—	—
2001	"Blue Skies"	—	—	—	—	—
2007	"I Saw Something" (with P.P. Arnold; promo-only release)	—	—	—	—	—
2011	"Heavenly Thing" (Germany-only release)	—	—	—	—	—
2018	"Lost in Rasa" (Monks Road Social featuring Dr. Robert)	—	—	—	—	—
2019	"The Coming of Grace" (Monks Road Social featuring Dr. Robert & Stone Foundation)	—	—	—	—	—
2020	"Get Yourself Together" (with Youth)	—	—	—	—	—
"—" denotes releases that did not chart or were not released
