= Blow Monkeys the Masters =

Blow Monkeys The Masters

Compilation album by The Blow Monkeys
- Released: 1997
- Recorded: 1984–1990
- Label: Eagle Series
- Producer: Dr. Robert; Adam Moseley; Peter Wilson; Michael Baker & The Axeman; Stephen Hague; Juan Atkins; Paul Witts/Egor

The Blow Monkeys chronology
Springtime for the World (1990)	Blow Monkeys The Masters (1997)	Atomic Lullabies - Very Best of The Blow Monkeys (1999)

Blow Monkeys The Masters is a compilation album from British pop band The Blow Monkeys, released in 1997 by the Eagle label, for its well-known "Eagle Series", presenting many UK group's master collections.

The second greatest hits album, following Choices - The Singles Collection, it was released in 1989, and contained all their most popular singles (including all four singles taken from the band's best-selling album, She Was Only a Grocer's Daughter, which also featured their best-selling single, the UK No. 5 hit "It Doesn't Have to Be This Way", and "Wicked Ways", and The Blow Monkeys' first hit single, "Digging Your Scene"). Also on the album is the three most popular singles from their debut album, Limping for a Generation, the two previously unreleased tracks on the previous collection, that is the duets with Sylvia Tella (the big hit "Choice?" and the minor hit "Slaves No More"), and the last single released by the band before they split up, "La Passionara".

On Blow Monkeys The Masters was the hard to find cover version of "Superfly" by Curtis Mayfield, whom vocalist and leader Dr. Robert has always pointed to as his main musical inspiration. The song was originally a B-side of the 1986 single, "Don't Be Scared of Me". From their 1988 album Whoops! There Goes the Neighbourhood was the only two songs here which never appeared in single format, "No Woman Is An Island" and "Squaresville". The album did not feature the second best-charting single from the band, "Wait", which got to No. 7 in early 1989.

== Track listing ==
1. "Digging Your Scene" (from Animal Magic, 1986)
2. "Wicked Ways" (from Animal Magic, 1986)
3. "It Doesn't Have to Be This Way" (from She Was Only a Grocer's Daughter, 1987)
4. "Out with Her" (from She Was Only a Grocer's Daughter, 1987)
5. "Celebrate (The Day After You)" (with Curtis Mayfield) (from She Was Only a Grocer's Daughter, 1987)
6. "Some Kind of Wonderful" (from She Was Only a Grocer's Daughter, 1987)
7. "This Is Your Life" (1989, from Whoops! There Goes the Neighbourhood, 1988)
8. "Choice?" (with Sylvia Tella) (from Choices - The Singles Collection, 1989)
9. "Slaves No More" (with Sylvia Tella) (from Choices - The Singles Collection, 1989)
10. "La Passionara" (from Springtime for the World, 1990)
11. "Superfly" (from the B-Side to the "Don't be Scared of Me" single, 1986)
12. "Atomic Lullaby" (from Limping for a Generation, 1984)
13. "It Pays to Belong" (from Whoops! There Goes the Neighbourhood, 1988)
14. "Man from Russia" (from Limping for a Generation, 1984)
15. "Wildflower" (from Limping for a Generation, 1984)
16. "Forbidden Fruit" (1985, from Animal Magic, 1986)
17. "No Woman Is an Island" (from Whoops! There Goes the Neighbourhood, 1988)
18. "Squareville" (from Whoops! There Goes the Neighbourhood, 1988)

== Personnel ==
- Dr Robert: lyrics, vocals, guitar, piano
- Mick Anker: bass guitar
- Neville Henry: saxophone
- Tony Kiley: drums, percussion
