= Lucy Doesn't Love You =

2000 single by Ivy

- Cover art for Japan CD single

Single by Ivy

from the album Long Distance
- Released: 2000
- Studio: Stratosphere Sound (New York City)
- Genre: Trip hop; synth-pop
- Length: 3:57
- Label: Unfiltered
- Songwriters: Adam Schlesinger; Andy Chase; Dominique Durand
- Producers: Adam Schlesinger; Andy Chase

Ivy singles chronology
"You Don't Know Anything" (1999)	"Lucy Doesn't Love You" (2000)	"Disappointed" (2001)

"Lucy Doesn't Love You" is a song by American band Ivy for their third studio album, Long Distance (2000). Lead singer Dominique Durand wrote the song with band members Adam Schlesinger and Andy Chase, who both produced it. In 2000, it was chosen as the album's lead single in Japan and distributed via Chase's Unfiltered Records label. Musically, the song was described as a melodic, horn-led trip hop and synth-pop track. Its lyrics find a woman confronting a lovestruck man who desires a different woman, named Lucy, who is not in love with him. American musician Eric Matthews performs trumpet on "Lucy Doesn't Love You", alongside Paco member Michael Hampton, who contributes to the song's instrumentation.

"Lucy Doesn't Love You" has received mostly favorable reviews from music critics, who commonly discussed the song's production. An accompanying music video for the song was released in 2000 and features side-by-side split screen graphics of Durand singing alongside Schlesinger, Chase, and other background dancers and singers. The song also appeared in the 2002 American film I'm with Lucy, alongside Long Distance track "One More Last Kiss".

== Background and release ==
After the release of Ivy's second studio album, Apartment Life, in 1997, they were dropped from Atlantic, and signed onto 550 Music. During this transition phase, the band's New York City-based The Place recording studio burned down and was replaced with a new one Stratosphere Sound, founded by members Adam Schlesinger and Andy Chase. After reissuing Apartment Life, Schlesinger worked with his band Fountains of Wayne to release their second studio album, Utopia Parkway, in 1999. The album commercially underperformed according to label expectations, resulting in their own drop from Atlantic. Because of the termination, Schlesinger resumed working with Ivy on their third album, Long Distance.

Outside of its single release, "Lucy Doesn't Love You" appears on Long Distance as the album's sixth track, which was initially released in Japan on November 8, 2000. The song was written by Schlesinger, Chase, and Durand, while the production was handled by the latter two artists. Ivy recorded the song at Stratosphere Sound in New York City while mastering occurred at nearby Sony Music Studios and was handled by Vlado Meller. Schlesinger and Chase both are credited as mixers on the song, receiving assistance from John Holbrook, and Chase engineered the track with assistance from Geoff Sanoff.

In Japan, "Lucy Doesn't Love You" was chosen as the lead single in support of Long Distance. It was first released as a CD single in that country, paired with Long Distance song "Blame It on Yourself" as a bonus track; the release occurred in 2000, prior to the Japanese release of the album, and was handled by East West Japan. Additionally, a promotional CD single for "Lucy Doesn't Love You" featuring an alternative cover artwork and bonus cover of the Blow Monkeys' 1986 single "Digging Your Scene". Outside of Japan, in regions like the United States, "Edge of the Ocean" was chosen as the parent album's lead single instead.

== Composition and lyrics ==
Musically, "Lucy Doesn't Love You" is a horn-led trip hop and synth-pop song. Tom Topkoff from Hybrid magazine noted the presence of horn instruments on the song, and compared it to the style of pop music in the 1960s. Additionally, he considered "Lucy Doesn't Love You" to be similar in sound to older Ivy songs, such as "Don't Believe a Word" (1995) and "Get Out of the City" (1997). American musician Eric Matthews is credited with playing trumpet on the song. Rob O'Connor from CMJ New Music Monthly reasoned that Matthew's performance helped form a "comfortable bounce" to the production. Michael Padletta, writing for Billboard, called the song more rhythmic than the rest of Ivy's discography, due to its addition of a guitar. According to AllMusic's Heather Phares, "Lucy Doesn't Love You" adds a "sassy brass and lifting melody" to a trip hop and slick synth-pop backdrop. The Miami Herald called the song ultra mellow and compared Durand's vocal style to that of Debbie Harry, lead singer of the American band Blondie.

According to its sheet music, "Lucy Doesn't Love You" is set in the time signature of common time, and has an average moderate tempo of 119 beats per minute. The song is composed in the key of D major and it follows the typical setup of two verses, each succeeded by a chorus, and ending with a final chorus. The first verse begins using the chord progressions of A–G–D–Bm, which are replicated during the other verses; during the chorus, the song's progressions transition to a different structure of G-C-D-A. Fellow Paco member Michael Hampton and American musician Jeremy Freeman are credited with providing additional loops and sounds to the song. The lyrics to "Lucy Doesn't Love You" describe a woman confronting a distraught, lovestruck man who is in love with a different woman who does not love him back. For the chorus, Durand exclaims: "Lucy doesn't love you / Not like you want her to / Some dreams don't come true".

== Reception and promotion ==
The music video for "Lucy Doesn't Love You" is presented in a side-by-side split screen format, featuring scenes of Dominique Durand singing alongside the other band members performing.

"Lucy Doesn't Love You" was met with mostly favorable reviews from music critics. A reviewer from E! Online wrote that Long Distance was "armed" with "Lucy Doesn't Love You" and considered it a strong enough single to create a surge in Ivy's popularity. Padletta thought the track's production sounded effortless and praised it for being effervescent. Topkoff also enjoyed the song and wrote that it is "definitely the jumpiest tune on the album". Stephen Thomas Erlewine, the senior editor for AllMusic, provided a more mixed review of the song, writing that its production "suggest[a] a more satisfying song than it delivers".

The accompanying music video to "Lucy Doesn't Love You" was filmed and released in 2000. It was the first of two videos released to promote Long Distance. The video for "Lucy Doesn't Love You" is presented mostly in a side-by-side split screen format. Filmed inside a nightclub space, it begins with Durand entering on-stage alongside clips of the band performing their instruments. Various shots of an audience, background dancers and singers, and trumpet performers are also shown. Outside of its usage in the video, "Lucy Doesn't Love You" also appears in the similarly-titled 2002 American comedy film I'm with Lucy, to which Ivy had already contributed "One More Last Kiss", a different song from Long Distance.

== Track listings ==
CD single
No.	Title	Length
1.	"Lucy Doesn't Love You"	4:00
2.	"Blame It on Yourself"	4:06

Promotional CD single
No.	Title	Length
1.	"Lucy Doesn't Love You"	3:57
2.	"Blame It on Yourself"	4:06
3.	"Digging Your Scene"	3:40

== Credits and personnel ==
Credits adapted from the liner notes of Long Distance.

- Adam Schlesinger – writer, producer, mixer
- Andy Chase – writer, producer, mixer, engineer
- Dominique Durand – writer
- Geoff Sanoff – assistant engineer
- Vlado Meller – mastering
- John Holbrook – additional mixing
- Jeremy Freeman – additional loops, additional sounds
- Michael Hampton – additional loops, additional sounds
- Eric Matthews – trumpet

== Release history ==
Release dates and formats for "Lucy Doesn't Love You"
Region	Date	Format	Label	Ref.
Japan	2000	CD	Unfiltered	
Japan	2000	Promotional CD	East West Japan	
