= Edge of the Ocean =

2001 single by Ivy

Single by Ivy

from the album Long Distance
- B-side: "Hideaway"; "Only a Fool Would Say That"
- Released: June 2001
- Studio: Stratosphere Sound (New York City)
- Genre: Trip hop; pop
- Length: 4:25
- Label: Nettwerk
- Songwriters: Adam Schlesinger; Andy Chase; Dominique Durand
- Producers: Adam Schlesinger; Andy Chase

Ivy singles chronology
"Disappointed" (2001)	"Edge of the Ocean" (2001)	"Digging Your Scene" (2001)

"Edge of the Ocean" is a song by the American band Ivy for their third studio album, Long Distance (2000). Lead singer Dominique Durand wrote the song with band members Adam Schlesinger and Andy Chase, who both produced it. It was released as the album's lead single in the United States in June 2001, through Nettwerk. Various physical singles were distributed throughout the following year, in addition to an adult alternative airplay release in the US. The song is an electronic-inspired trip hop pop ballad with minimal and simplistic lyrics. Durand's vocals were described as childlike and compared to those of Karen Carpenter. American musician Michael Hampton, a member of Durand and Chase's other band Paco, contributes to the track's instrumentation.

"Edge of the Ocean" has received generally positive reviews from music critics, who called it a highlight from Long Distance. Following Schlesinger's death in 2020, the song was revisited by critics and frequently labeled as one of his finest works. It became Ivy's only single to chart, reaching number 160 on the UK Singles Chart and number 86 in Scotland. An accompanying music video for "Edge of the Ocean" was released in 2001 and directed by Schlesinger. It features Ivy relaxing at the beach and singing along to the song. "Edge of the Ocean" was featured in various television advertising campaigns, including for Holland America in 2002 and American Airlines in 2011, and has since been referred to as Ivy's signature song.

== Background and release ==
Following the release of their second studio album, Apartment Life, in 1997, Ivy was dropped from their record label Atlantic, and signed to 550 Music. Around the same time, the band's New York City recording studio burned down and was replaced with a new one, founded by Schlesinger and other member Andy Chase. After reissuing Apartment Life, member Adam Schlesinger released his second studio album with American band Fountains of Wayne, Utopia Parkway (1999). The album commercially underperformed, resulting in a second release from Atlantic and Schlesinger resuming work with Ivy.

"Edge of the Ocean" first appeared on Long Distance, as the album's third track, which was initially released in Japan on November 8, 2000. It also appears on a Nettwerk-sponsored sampler album that was handed out during Coldplay's Parachutes Tour concert series in 2001. The song was written by Schlesinger, Chase, and Durand, while the production was handled by the latter two artists. Ivy recorded the song at Stratosphere Sound in New York City while mastering occurred at nearby Sony Music Studios and was handled by Vlado Meller. Schlesinger and Chase both are credited as mixers on the song and, additionally, Chase engineered the track with assistance from Geoff Sanoff.

Chosen as the album's lead single in the United States, "Edge of the Ocean" was released in various formats as a single. In June 2001, when Ivy's cover of the Blow Monkeys' "Digging Your Scene" was sent to US modern rock radio stations as a single, "Edge of the Ocean" and Long Distance track "Disappointed" were distributed to adult alternative radio stations in the US for airplay. The US then received a limited edition, individually numbered 10" vinyl release, which occurred on July 10, 2001. It features an alternate version of "Hideaway" as the B-side and their previously unreleased cover of Steely Dan's "Only a Fool Would Say That" (1972). An extended play for "Edge of the Ocean" was distributed in the United Kingdom and released by Nettwerk. The promotional version was released in 2001, while the commercial versions were released on May 27, 2002 on 12" vinyl and compact discs; it features the Alpha's 'On the Beach' Mix, DuoTone Mix, Analog Bronca Mix, and album versions of "Edge of the Ocean" in two different orders, depending on the release. Also in 2002, the Filterheadz Dub Mix of the song was released as a 12" promotional single in the UK. Nettwerk digitally released the EP and Filterheadz Dub Mix to music retailers on July 19, 2011.

== Composition and lyrics ==
Musically, "Edge of the Ocean" is a "shimmering [and] contemporary" electronic-inspired trip hop pop ballad. In a 2011 interview with Magnet, Chase explained that the song balances "between the uplifting music and the bittersweet lyric," which he stated was also his preferred musical style. He continued, saying that while writing the song, they tried "to go 100 percent" with creating a lyrical balance that "[came] from a specific place and yet remain[ed] general, even vague, enough that they can apply to anyone". In his weekly musical column, Bradford Brady from Star-News called Durand's vocals "haunting" and compared them to American singer Karen Carpenter. Chuck Campbell, writing for the same publication, called the chorus shimmering and described Durand's vocals as childlike. Tom Topkoff from Hybrid magazine referred to "Edge of the Ocean" as a "captivating and escapist tune" that sets the album's tone.

According to its sheet music, "Edge of the Ocean" is set in the time signature of common time, and has a moderate tempo of 96 beats per minute. The song is composed in the key of D-flat major and it follows the setup of an instrumental intro, followed by two verses, each succeeded by a chorus and another intro. The first verse begins using the chord progressions of G♭–E♭m–D♭–G♭, which are replicated during the other verses and choruses; during the pre-chorus and bridge, the progressions transition to a E♭m–D♭–G♭–G♭ structure. American musicians Jeremy Freeman and fellow Paco member Michael Hampton are credited with providing additional loops and sounds to the song. The lyrics to "Edge of the Ocean" are rather simple, and were described as romantic. Durand opens the song explaining: "There's a place I dream about / Where the sun never goes out"; the chorus contains more minimalistic lyrics, with Durand harmonizing to "sha la la la la la la" repeatedly.

== Reception and promotion ==
Schlesinger directed the beach-inspired music video for "Edge of the Ocean", the second video created for Long Distance.

"Edge of the Ocean" has received generally favorable reviews from music critics. Noel Dix from Exclaim liked it and album tracks "Worry About You" and "While We're in Love" for "com[ing] across as genuine rather than a pop band trying to cross over to the electronic scene". A reviewer from Resonance magazine provided a positive review of the song, calling it "a cool summer song", while a critic from The Boston Globe labeled it as a gem on Long Distance. In 2014, Mashable featured "Edge of the Ocean" on a list of "21 Songs to Help You Keep Calm". An AllMusic critic awarded the song 2.5 out of 5 stars in 2001. In a negative review, a critic from Alternative Press grouped "Edge of the Ocean" with the tracks that are "improbably edgeless, all love-me-do/love-me-don't plaints that evaporate on impact" on Long Distance. Following Schlesinger's death in 2020, several critics re-analyzed his discography retrospectively. Rob Tannenbaum from The New York Times compiled a list of his 30 most essential songs; "Edge of the Ocean" was Schlesinger's only Ivy song to appear on the list, and Tannenbaum described it as a highlight on Long Distance.

Following the song's release in the United Kingdom in 2002, "Edge of the Ocean" became the group's first and only single to reach the Official Charts Company's UK Singles Chart. For the issue dated June 15, 2002, the song entered the chart at number 160 and fell off the following week. It also charted in Scotland in August 2008, debuting at number 86. According to Nettwerk, the song is Ivy's most commercially successful single, and they consider it to be their signature song. Variety's Charlie Amter noted that it was the group's most streamed song on Spotify and had been prominently used in several film and television appearances. According to John C. Hughes from Pop Dose claimed that because of how many media appearances the song had made, "chances are [most have] heard it and didn’t even know it". Ivy appeared as themselves on the American scripted television series Roswell to perform the Duotone Mix of "Edge of the Ocean" on the season 3 episode "To Have and to Hold" (2001). It later appeared on the series' official soundtrack, which was announced on December 13, 2001, and released on February 26, 2002. Additionally, "Edge of the Ocean" has been notably featured on Grey's Anatomy, and in 2011 it was used in American Airlines' television advertisement campaign. Ivy also lent the song to Holland America in 2002 for their then-upcoming ad campaign, in a move that Chase thought would be beneficial to the band. He explained: "At our level, this commercial can mean the difference between making our next album or not. Now, maybe there's people who look at us and that as a sellout. But I pose the question, would you rather hear another Ivy record or never hear another record again but we won't do any commercials?"

An accompanying music video for "Edge of the Ocean" was filmed and directed by Schlesinger. It was released in 2001 and was the second video developed for Long Distance, after the release of "Lucy Doesn't Love You" in 2000. The "Edge of the Ocean" clip features the usage of the shorter Duotone Mix, as opposed to the album version. The video begins with Durand casually walking around a sandy beach and occasionally lip syncing to the song. Location shots of nearby boats, cliffs and landscape are interwoven with scenes of Durand, Schlesinger, and Chase adventuring oceanside.

== Track listings and formats ==
- 10" single
1. "Edge of the Ocean" – 4:25
2. "Hideaway" (Alternate Version) – 4:09
3. "Only a Fool Would Say That" (Alternate Version) – 3:01
- 12" single/promotional 12" single – EP (version 1)
1. "Edge of the Ocean" (Alpha's 'On the Beach' Mix) – 4:58
2. "Edge of the Ocean" (Duotone Mix) – 4:08
3. "Edge of the Ocean" (Analog Bronca Mix) – 4:41
4. "Edge of the Ocean" – 4:25
- CD single/digital download/streaming – EP (version 2)
1. "Edge of the Ocean" (Duotone Mix) – 4:12
2. "Edge of the Ocean" (Alpha's 'On the Beach' Mix) – 5:02
3. "Edge of the Ocean" (Analog Bronca Mix) – 4:45
4. "Edge of the Ocean" – 4:25
- Digital download/promotional 12" single/streaming – Filterheadz Dub Mix
1. "Edge of the Ocean" (Filterheadz Dub Mix) – 5:13

== Credits and personnel ==
Credits adapted from the liner notes of Long Distance and Tidal.

- Adam Schlesinger – writer, producer, mixer
- Andy Chase – writer, producer, mixer, engineer
- Dominique Durand – writer
- Geoff Sanoff – assistant engineer
- Vlado Meller – mastering
- Jeremy Freeman – additional loops, additional sounds
- Michael Hampton – additional loops, additional sounds

== Charts ==
Chart performance for "Edge of the Ocean"
Chart (2002–2008)	Peak position
Scottish Singles Sales (Official Charts)	86
UK Singles (OCC)	160

== Release history ==
Release dates and formats for "Edge of the Ocean"
Region	Date	Format(s)	Version	Label	Ref.
United States	June 2001	Adult alternative radio	Original	Nettwerk	
United States	July 10, 2001	10"	Original	Nettwerk	
United Kingdom	2001	Promotional 12"	EP (version 1)	Nettwerk	
United Kingdom	May 27, 2002	12"	EP (version 1)	Nettwerk	
United Kingdom	May 27, 2002	CD	EP (version 2)	Nettwerk	
United Kingdom	2002	Promotional 12"	Filterheadz Dub mix	Nettwerk	
Various	July 19, 2011	Digital download; streaming	EP (version 2)	Nettwerk	(Note: The "Edge of the Ocean" EP was released to Apple Music on July 19, 2011, but lists the single's previous July 10, 2001 release date instead.)
Various	July 19, 2011	Digital download; streaming	Filterheadz Dub mix	Nettwerk	(Note: "Edge of the Ocean (Filterheadz Dub Mix)" was released to Apple Music on July 19, 2011, but lists the single's previous July 10, 2001 release date instead.)
