= Digging Your Scene =

1986 single by the Blow Monkeys

Single by The Blow Monkeys

from the album Animal Magic
- A-side: "I Backed a Winner (In You)"
- B-side: "Digging Your Scene" (Short); "Digging Your Scene" (Longer)
- Released: February 1986
- Recorded: 1985–1986
- Genre: Pop; soul; jazz; sophisti-pop
- Length: 4:13
- Label: RCA; Ariola
- Songwriter: Dr. Robert
- Producers: Peter Wilson; Dr. Robert; Adam Moesley

The Blow Monkeys singles chronology
| "Forbidden Fruit" (1985) | "Digging Your Scene" (1986) | "Wicked Ways" (1986) |

Music video
- "Digging Your Scene” on YouTube

"Digging Your Scene" is a song recorded by English band The Blow Monkeys for their second studio album, Animal Magic (1986). The single was released in February 1986 as the second one from the parent record. It was written by lead singer Dr. Robert (Robert Howard), while Howard, Peter Wilson, and Adam Moesley produced it. Musically a pop, soul, and jazz song, "Digging Your Scene" subtly discusses the hatred and criticism of individuals who have HIV and AIDS.

The single was widely praised by music critics, with several agreeing it would succeed as a radio single. Others appreciated the mainstream feel and quirkiness of the production. It was also a commercially successful single, peaking at number 10 in New Zealand and at number 14 in the United States. "Digging Your Scene" reached number 12 in the United Kingdom, becoming their highest-peaking single at the time. A music video for "Digging Your Scene" was released in May 1986 at a music festival in Switzerland. The song has since been included on various compilation and greatest hits albums, including Choices – The Singles Collection in 1989 and Digging Your Scene: The Best of The Blow Monkeys in 2008.

== Composition and lyrics ==
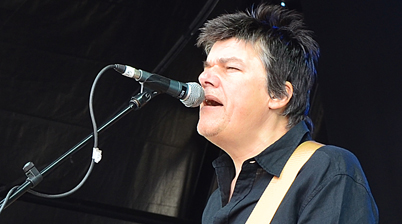
Dr. Robert performing with The Blow Monkeys live in 2014.

A pop, soul, and jazz song with influence from European and British music, The Blow Monkeys subtly discuss the hatred and criticism of individuals who have been diagnosed with HIV and AIDS. Tommy Marx from PopMatters said that the lyrics were about the anti-gay sentiment of the time and the song became "a major hit". Dr. Robert, the singer of "Digging Your Scene", additionally sings about life as a homosexual, where he worries, "Tell me why is it I'm digging your scene? / I know I'll die, baby". In contrast with the protagonist he portrays in the song, Dr. Robert was married to a woman – his first wife, Linda Nolte – at the time (though they were on the verge of divorcing), and he soon went on to marry his current wife (as of 2021), Michele, and have several children. At the time, this situation prompted Barry Walters from Spin to write, "Dr. Robert loves camp, so it's difficult to determine if he's bi or just British."

Writer Colin Larkin stated in his book The Encyclopedia of Popular Music that "Digging Your Scene" was "one of the earliest songs about AIDS". Music researcher Michael Anderson declared that the "backlash" would "court controversy". Walters also compared the lyrical themes on The Blow Monkeys' third studio album, She Was Only a Grocer's Daughter (1987), to "Digging Your Scene".

== Critical reception ==
Gary Berkowitz, a programmer from Billboard, predicted that the song's sound would appeal to the Top 40 crowd, and similarly, author Martin Charles Strong described it as a destined hit. AllMusic's William Cooper took a liking to "Digging Your Scene" for being engaging, while Keith Tuber, a columnist for Orange Coast, felt it stood out on Animal Magic before calling it a "good [...] quirky '60s-English-invasion-sounding song". Regarding its legacy, Walters from Spin claimed that the single "transformed Dr. Robert from a klutzy cult novelty to a mainstream face in his homeland".

== Chart performance ==
"Digging Your Scene" is one of The Blow Monkeys' most commercially successful singles. In the United Kingdom, the recording peaked at number 12, becoming the group's second-highest-peaking single, behind "It Doesn't Have to Be This Way", which peaked at number five in January 1987. On the United States' Billboard Hot 100, it entered at number 89 for the week ending 3 May 1986, becoming the issue's fifth-highest entry. The song continued increasing its position on the chart before reaching its peak position of number 14 on 2 August of the same year. The following week, the single decreased its position to number 21. "Digging Your Scene" consistently escalated down the Hot 100 until 6 September 1986 when its position was at number 99, the final mark before departing. It also peaked at number 16 on the Hot 100 Airplay, a component chart for the Billboard Hot 100.

The United States remix reached the number seven mark on the Dance Club Songs chart, which was formerly called the Hot Dance/Disco chart. On its 13th week on Canada's official charts, compiled by RPM, "Digging Your Scene" peaked at number 19, also the group's highest entry in that respective country. In Australia and New Zealand, it peaked at numbers 16 and 10, respectively, while in Germany and the Netherlands, it peaked at numbers 25 and 23, respectively.

== Music video ==
The official music video for "Digging Your Scene" was released in 1986. It features the band members performing the single at a show in front of a large group of individuals. Other scenes show Dr. Robert sitting with the audience at tables and backup dancers wearing striped attire. The video was featured and debuted at the first International Music & Media Conference that took place in Montreux, Switzerland between 7–10 May 1986. It also received heavy rotation on MTV's lineup of music videos in mid 1986.

== Promotion and use in media ==
"Digging Your Scene" was included on the British compilation album Hits 4, released on 17 March 1986 as a collection of singles in the United Kingdom. The Blow Monkeys also included it in several of their greatest hits albums, including Choices – The Singles Collection (1989), Best Selection (1994), The Best of Blow Monkeys (1994), For the Record (1996), Blow Monkeys the Masters (1997), Complete Singles (2000), and their final collection Digging Your Scene: The Best of The Blow Monkeys (2008).

The band also created a lullaby children's version of "Digging Your Scene" for Atomic Lullabies: Very Best of The Blow Monkeys (1999). Japanese group Paris Match covered it for their 2007 album, Our Favourite Pop, in dedication to Our Favourite Shop, a 1985 album by The Style Council. "Digging Your Scene" was mentioned in Marc Spitz's novel How Soon Is Never?, where the protagonist Joe Green recalls listening to it on the radio with his girlfriend, Jennifer.

== Track listings and formats ==
Standard edition 12" maxi single

- A1. "Digging Your Scene" – 6:25
- A2. "I Backed a Winner (In You)" – 2:39
- B1. "Digging Your Scene" (Short) – 4:14
- B2. "Digging Your Scene" (Longer) – 5:41

Canada & Europe 7" single

- A1. "Digging Your Scene" – 4:13
- B1. "I Backed a Winner (In You)" – 2:39

Japan 12" single

- A1. "Digging Your Scene" – 6:25
- A2. "Digging Your Scene" (Instrumental) – 6:28
- B1. "Wicked Ways" – 4:14

United Kingdom 10" remix single

- A1. "Digging Your Scene" (Remix) – 7:33
- A2. "I Backed a Winner (In You)" – 2:37
- B1. "Digging Your Scene" (Instrumental) – 5:27
- B2. "Man from Russia" (Remix) – 3:26

United Kingdom 12" promotional single

- A1. "Digging Your Scene" – 6:25
- B1. "Digging Your Scene" (Short) – 4:14

United Kingdom 12" remix single

- A1. "Digging Your Re-Mix" – 7:33
- A2. "I Backed a Winner (In You)" – 2:37
- B1. "Digging Your Instrumental" – 5:27
- B2. "Digging Your Scene" (Short) – 4:14

United States 7" promotional single

- A1. "Digging Your Scene" (U.K. Mix) – 4:13
- B1. "Digging Your Scene" (U.S. Mix) – 4:40

United States 12" promotional single

- A1. "Digging Your Scene" (Extended Mix) – 6:25
- B1. "Digging Your Scene" (LP Version) – 4:13
- B2. "Digging Your Scene" (Dub Cosmic Mix) – 5:42

United States 12" single

- A1. "Digging Your Scene" (LP Version) – 4:13
- B1. "Digging Your Scene" (LP Version) – 4:13

== Personnel ==
=== The Blow Monkeys ===
- Dr. Robert: Lead vocals, Guitar
- Mick Anker: Bass guitar
- Neville Henry: Tenor Saxophone
- Tony Kiley: Drums

=== Additional Musicians ===
- Peter Wilson: Keyboards, String arrangements
- Luís Jardim: Percussion
- Axel Kroll: Drum programming
- Dixie Peach, Morris Michael: Backing vocals

== Charts ==
| Chart (1986) | Peak position |
|---|---|
| Australia (Kent Music Report) | 16 |
| Canada Top Singles (RPM) | 19 |
| France (IFOP) | 75 |
| Germany (Official German Charts) | 25 |
| Ireland (IRMA) | 9 |
| Netherlands (Single Top 100) | 23 |
| New Zealand (Recorded Music NZ) | 10 |
| UK Singles (Official Charts) | 12 |
| US Billboard Hot 100 | 14 |
| US Dance Club Songs (Billboard) | 7 |
| US Cash Box Top 100 | 18 |

== Release history ==
| Region | Date | Format | Label |
|---|---|---|---|
| United Kingdom | February 1986 | 12" | RCA |
| Various | 18 May 1986 | All other formats | RCA |

== Ivy version ==
"Digging Your Scene"

Single by Ivy

from the album Long Distance and Guestroom
- Released: June 2001
- Recorded: 2000
- Length: 3:40
- Label: Imperial
- Songwriter: Dr. Robert
- Producers: Adam Schlesinger; Andy Chase

Ivy singles chronology
| "Edge of the Ocean" (2001) | "Digging Your Scene" (2001) | "Thinking About You" (2005) |

=== Background and development ===
American band Ivy recorded a cover of "Digging Your Scene" for their third studio album, Long Distance (2000). It was first distributed to modern rock radio for airplay in June 2001, coinciding with the release of the aforementioned album. However, it was released for a second time as a CD single on 27 May 2002 by Imperial Records, exclusively in Japan, becoming the lead single for Guestroom (2002). Their rendition was produced by band members Adam Schlesinger and Andy Chase. Ivy's cover was used on the science fiction television series Roswell, on the November 2001 episode "To Have and to Hold".

Lead singer Dominique Durand sings "Digging Your Scene" in "her usual deadpan elegance", according to Rolling Stone's Rob Sheffield, especially when she coos lines like, "I'm like a boy among men". Billboard's Michael Paoletta referred to Ivy's twist on the recording as "dizzying".

=== Critical reception ===
Tom Topkoff from Hybrid Magazine lauded Ivy's version, writing, "Durand's treatment seems so natural...if you didn't know the original, you'd think it was written with her vocals in mind". Michaelangelo Matos of the Minneapolis' City Pages was also fond of the cover, calling it "giddy without putting a mask on the experience that went into getting it made". CMJ New Music Monthly's Ken Scrudato said that their cover proved that Ivy is "painfully hip". Heather Phares, an editor for AllMusic, called the track a highlight on Long Distance due to its "superior songwriting", although she found it to be "an ironic move". Rob Sheffield of Rolling Stone was positive, stating that Durand "end[s] Long Distance on an enigmatic, seductive and wildly appropriate note" with "Digging Your Scene". Regarding its inclusion on Guestroom, Noel Dix from Exclaim! remarked that on the album, the best tracks were ones that are already "familiar to Ivy fans", alluding to the fact that their cover had been previously released; he also stated that the best thing about their rendition was the "joyful infection" it induces.

=== Track listing ===
CD single
| No. | Title | Length |
|---|---|---|
| 1. | "Digging Your Scene" | 3:40 |

=== Release history ===
| Region | Date | Format | Label |
|---|---|---|---|
| United States | June 2001 | Modern rock radio | Nettwerk |
| Japan | 27 May 2002 | CD | Imperial |
