= Digging Your Scene: The Best of The Blow Monkeys =

Greatest hits album by The Blow Monkeys
- Released: 4 February 2008
- Recorded: 1984–1990
- Length: 120:00 (approx. total time): 60:00 ca. (disc 1); 60:00 ca. (disc 2)
- Label: Music Club Deluxe
- Producer: Dr. Robert; Adam Moseley; Peter Wilson; Michael Baker & The Axeman; Stephen Hague; Juan Atkins; Paul Witts/Egor; Hector

The Blow Monkeys chronology
Atomic Lullabies - Very Best of The Blow Monkeys (1999)	Digging Your Scene: The Best of The Blow Monkeys (2008)

Digging Your Scene: The Best of The Blow Monkeys is a double greatest hits album, released on 4 February 2008 by British band The Blow Monkeys. Led by singer, guitarist, piano and keyboard player Dr. Robert, the group formed in the early 1980s and disbanded in 1990. After that, Dr. Robert went on to pursue a solo career. The Blow Monkeys recently reformed, with the aim of touring and releasing a brand new album.

The 36 tracks included on this double compilation were originally featured on the band's first five studio albums, and most of them were also released as singles, the most successful ones including "It Doesn't Have to Be This Way" (which reached Number 5 in the UK Singles Chart in 1987, their highest position ever), and "Digging Your Scene" (climbing to Number 12 in 1986, this song represented their first British, American and worldwide hit, also making it to Number 14 in the US Billboard Hot 100, Number 7 in the US Hot Dance Club Play, and Number 25 in Germany).

Another Top Ten track was the smash hit "Wait", a duet which got to Number 7, and was only credited to the leader Dr. Robert, as Robert Howard (his real name), and Chicago house diva Kym Mazelle, though it was actually played by the whole group and featured on their fourth studio album Whoops! There Goes the Neighbourhood.

Five more duets are contained in the 2008 double greatest hits album, including the politically censored "Celebrate (The Day After You)", sung with Curtis Mayfield (it came out at the time of 1987 re-election, when then Prime Minister Margaret Thatcher was being attacked by many British musical acts, including The Blow Monkeys), "Be Not Afraid", a heartfelt interpretation of Robert with Arabian singer Cheb Khaled (the description of how this song actually came into being is one of the few things Howard wrote in the booklet to a less recent double compilation), "Choice?", a house stomper played by the band with young vocalist Sylvia Tella (one of their last hits, before splitting up in the early 1990s), who also co-performed "Slaves No More", a less successful single which also features here, and, last but not least, "Sweet Murder", one of the band's earlier interpretations, realised with toaster Eek-A-Mouse (never released as a single, this popular album track was contained in their second long playing work, namely Animal Magic, which also included their first hit "Digging Your Scene").

This greatest hits collection comprises many other stand-out tracks which were never taken out their respective albums, among which the fifth LP's title track "Springtime for the World", the instrumental medley "Vibe Alive/Reflections '89", "Squaresville", and many more.

== Track listings ==
=== CD 1 ===
1. "Digging Your Scene"
2. "Celebrate (The Day After You)" – The Blow Monkeys & Curtis Mayfield
3. "Wait" – Robert Howard & Kym Mazelle
4. "It Doesn't Have to Be This Way"
5. "Springtime for the World"
6. "Be Not Afraid" – The Blow Monkeys & Cheb Khaled
7. "Vibe Alive/Reflections '89"
8. "As the Dust Settles"
9. "La Passionara"
10. "This Is Your Life (1988 mix)"
11. "Choice?" – The Blow Monkeys & Sylvia Tella
12. "Slaves No More" – The Blow Monkeys & Sylvia Tella
13. "Out with Her"
14. "Heaven Is a Place"
15. "In Too Deep"
16. "Let the People Dance"
17. "Checking Out"
18. "If You Love Somebody"

=== CD 2 ===
1. "Man from Russia"
2. "He's Shedding Skin"
3. "Atomic Lullaby"
4. "Wildflower"
5. "Wicked Ways"
6. "Forbidden Fruit"
7. "Squaresville"
8. "It Pays to Belong"
9. "Trashtown Incident"
10. "Fat Cat Belusha"
11. "Bombed into the Stoneage"
12. "Aeroplane City Lovesong"
13. "I Backed a Winner in You"
14. "I Nearly Died Laughing"
15. "Come on Down"
16. "Sweet Murder" – The Blow Monkeys & Eek-A-Mouse
17. "Rise Above"
18. "The Other Side of You"

== Personnel ==
=== Band members ===
- Dr Robert: lead vocals, piano, guitar, music, lyrics, booklet
- Mick Anker: bass guitar
- Tony Kiley: drums
- Neville Henry: saxophone

=== Production ===
- Dr. Robert
- Adam Moseley
- Peter Wilson
- Michael Baker & The Axeman
- Stephen Hague
- Juan Atkins
- Paul Witts/Egor
- Hector

=== Other staff members ===
For the other musicians, producers and staff in detail, see The Blow Monkeys' six studio albums, their first greatest hits collection and their first live album.
