= This Is the Day (Ivy song) =

Single by Ivy

from the album Apartment Life
- Released: October 19, 1998
- Recorded: 1997
- Studio: The Place, Duotone Studios, Compositions (New York City)
- Genre: Pop; alternative pop
- Length: 3:33
- Label: 550 Music
- Songwriters: Dominique Durand; Adam Schlesinger; Andy Chase
- Producers: Adam Schlesinger; Andy Chase

Ivy singles chronology
"I've Got a Feeling" (1997)	"This Is the Day" (1998)	"You Don't Know Anything" (1999)

"This Is the Day" is a song by American band Ivy, included on their second studio album, Apartment Life (1997). It was released as the record's third single in the United States on October 19, 1998, by 550 Music following its inclusion in the 1998 American comedy film There's Something About Mary. The group had just been dropped by Atlantic Records but eventually signed to 550 Music after they reissued the parent album. The track was written by Dominique Durand, Adam Schlesinger and Andy Chase, with the latter two producing it. It is a pop and alternative pop song that features the use of horns and was compared to the works of the Smiths.

It was released as a CD single in two different formats, with the commercial release featuring two previously unreleased bonus tracks and the promotional release featuring just the album version of "This Is the Day". Music critics liked the track, with most considering it a standout track and noting the possibility of it making Apartment Life more successful.

== Background and release ==
The song was recorded in 1997 at three different recording studios in New York City and included on Ivy's second studio album, Apartment Life, released on October 7, 1997, by Atlantic Records. "This Is the Day" was prominently featured in the 1998 movie comedy There's Something About Mary and was included on the film's soundtrack album. Reflecting on its use in the film, Durand said it was unimaginable to see their songs in several scenes and that she "feels so grateful to have something like that in a movie."

Atlantic Records had signed Ivy earlier in 1997, but the band was later dropped and then picked up by 550 Music, a division of Sony Music Entertainment. Following the song's inclusion in the film, 550 Music distributed the song to radio stations across the United States on October 19, 1998. The track was issued as a CD single in the U.S. that included the bonus tracks "Sleeping Late" and "Sweet Mary." 550 Music also reissued Apartment Life in the U.S. with new cover art, digitally remastered tracks, and four of the songs remixed by Schlesinger and Chase, who opened a new recording studio in New York, Stratosphere, in June 1999. "This Is the Day" would also be included on the compilation albums Pepsi Pop Culture (1998) and Live a Little, Vol. 1 (1999).

== Composition and recording ==
"This Is the Day" was cowritten by Ivy members Dominique Durand, Adam Schlesinger and Andy Chase, with Schlesinger and Chase serving as producers. In the indie pop song, Durand sings about an ended relationship, stating in the chorus: "She's never com-ing back."

The track features backing vocals by musician James Iha and the addition of horns – a brand new element for Ivy, as they tried to incorporate more instruments into the songs on Apartment Life. The song was mixed by Paul Q. Kolderie and Sean Slade, assisted by Matthew Ellard; and Bob Ludwig finalized the mastering.

== Critical reception ==
"This Is the Day" received praise and favorable feedback from music critics. Frank Tortorici of MTV News wrote that the "bouncy, Blondie-esque" song shows that Ivy is different from Schlesinger's other band Fountains of Wayne, and that the track would help Apartment Life become a successful release.

Noting the use of "60s-ish horns," AllMusic reviewer Jack Rabid called it "la-la-la pop personified." Also referencing the horn section, Kurt B. Reighley from CMJ New Music Monthly joked that the Smiths must have "overlooked" the song and its "punchy melody." Agreeing, Vickie Gilmer and Ira Robbins from Trouser Press compared it to the same group and called the track "jaunty."

Along with "The Best Thing" (1997) and "You Don't Know Anything" (1999), Rabid said the single is one of the "pleasantly produced, precisely structured pop dreams that makes fans sing along" on Apartment Life. An editor at ROCKRGRL felt that given "This Is the Day", Ivy should have "gained more than a moment's attention". Hans Koller and Joyce Grenfell, contributors to The Encyclopedia of Popular Music, considered "This Is the Day" and "Baker" as the two best tracks on Apartment Life. Additionally, a Sputnikmusic member noted in their album review that "if you only have a dollar", the listener should "download th[is] track".

== Track listings ==
- CD single
1. "This Is the Day" – 3:33
2. "Sleeping Late" – 2:30
3. "Sweet Mary" – 3:14
- Promotional CD single
1. "This Is the Day" – 3:33

== Credits and personnel ==
Credits and personnel adapted from Apartment Life.

Management

- Recorded at The Place, New York City; Duotone Studios, New York City; and Compositions, New York City

Personnel

- Andy Chase – engineering, executive producer, mixing
- Dominique Durand – lead and background vocals
- Matthew Ellard – assistant mixing
- Philippe Garcia – photography
- Josh Grier – legal
- James Iha – background vocals, additional production
- Paul Q. Kolderie – mixing
- Bob Ludwig – mastering
- Q Prime – management
- Brenda Rotheiser – art direction, design
- Adam Schlesinger – engineering, executive producer, mixing
- Sean Slade – mixing
