= Apartment Life (disambiguation) =

Apartment Life may refer to:

- Apartment Life, the second studio album by indie rock band Ivy
- The Sims 2: Apartment Life, the expansion pack for the video game, The Sims 2
- Metropolitan Home, the publication known from 1974 to 1981 as Apartment Life
