= Grayson Hugh =

American musician

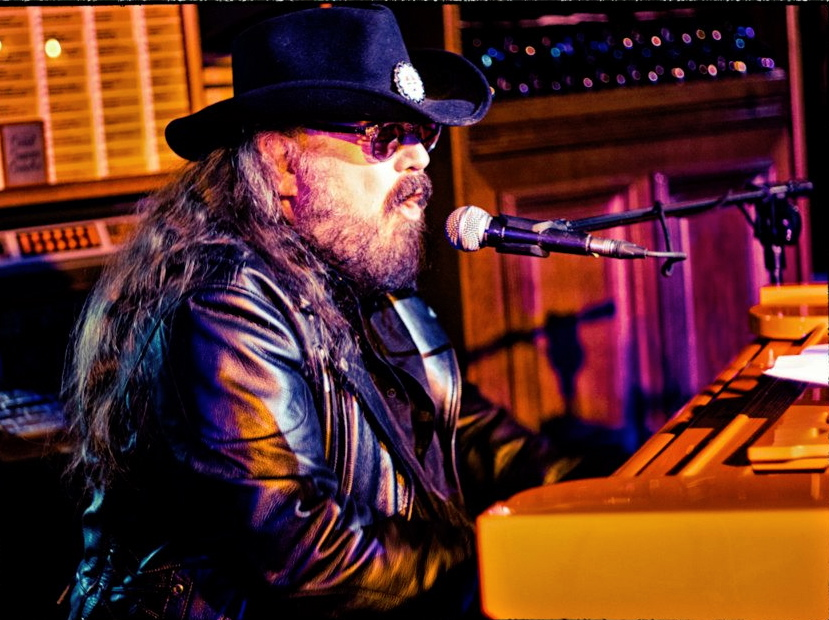
- Hugh performing at the Pomarańczowy Fortepian (The Orange Piano) in Pila, Poland in 2012

Background information
- Born: October 30, 1960 (age 66); Hartford, Connecticut, U.S.
- Origin: West Hartford, Connecticut, U.S.
- Genres: Soul; R&B; roots
- Occupations: Singer-songwriter, record producer
- Instruments: Vocals, piano, organ
- Years active: 1980–present
- Website: graysonhugh.net

Grayson Hugh (born October 30, 1960) is an American singer-songwriter, pianist, Hammond B3 organ player and composer. He is best known for his 1988 hit "Talk It Over", and his other blue-eyed soul hits "Bring It All Back" and "How 'Bout Us?".

== Early life ==
Hugh was the first generation of his family to be born in the United States, and grew up surrounded by classical music. His father was classical music radio host Ivor Hugh (born in Hammersmith, England); his mother was born in Shanghai, the daughter of missionary Frank Rawlinson (born in Langham, Rutland, England), who wrote nine books, including a life of Christ in Chinese.

Hugh began playing the piano at the age of three years. In his early teens, however, rock and roll and soul won out. He played for a year as the pianist in a black gospel church and studied African drumming. He studied piano with jazz pianist Jaki Byard and avant garde pianist Ran Blake. Hugh dropped out of high school during his junior year to focus on his music.

During his 20s, Hugh supplemented his income as a rock and soul musician by accompanying modern dance classes. This began his association as composer for several well-known choreographers, notably Viola Farber of New York, Prometheus Dance, Rebecca Rice (Boston Ballet) and Christine Bennett of Cambridge, Massachusetts. He briefly attended film school at the University of Bridgeport. Hugh struggled with alcoholism in the 1970s, achieving sobriety in 1980.

== Career ==
=== 1980s ===
In 1980, Hugh released a self-titled album (One in Nineteen Records, 1980). This album was produced by Ron Scalise, winner of 14 Emmy Awards for audio work with ESPN.

Hugh moved to New York City in 1986 where he happened to meet producer Michael Baker in an elevator. Baker was finishing producing The Blow Monkeys's album She Was Only a Grocer's Daughter for RCA Records. Hugh was hired to sing backup vocals on that album and subsequently signed to RCA Records as singer-songwriter in 1987. He broke into the Billboard Hot 100 in 1989 with three singles from his debut RCA album Blind to Reason (1988). In 1988 "Talk It Over", a song written by Sandy Linzer and Irwin Levine that Hugh arranged, reached the Top 20.

After Hugh had arranged and recorded the song, Olivia Newton-John was given rights of first release, then recorded it herself and released it as a single under the name "Can't We Talk It Over in Bed", which appeared on her album The Rumour. Hugh subsequently released his version which became a hit. His two other singles "Bring It All Back" and "How 'Bout Us" (a remake of the 1981 Champaign hit recorded with Betty Wright) were also radio hits. Blind to Reason eventually went gold in Australia. Hugh toured extensively in 1988 in the US and overseas, at first opening for Dickey Betts, Ian Hunter and Mick Ronson, Sheena Easton and Phoebe Snow, before beginning several years of headlining his own tours.

=== 1990s ===
Hugh's second major label album Road to Freedom (MCA Records, 1992) was voted "one of the year's top-ten albums" by Billboard Magazine and received rave reviews. Leonard Pitts Jr. of the Miami Herald said: "Have I heard any newcomer in the last decade who excites me as much as this guy? No."

Director Ridley Scott heard an advance pressing of Road to Freedom and wanted to put Hugh's music in his film Thelma & Louise (1991). They eventually settled on two: "I Can't Untie You From Me" and "Don't Look Back" (both of these songs having some additional music contributed by songwriter Holly Knight). His gospel-tinged arrangement of Bob Dylan's "I'll Remember You" was the featured end-title song for the film Fried Green Tomatoes (1991).

In 1993, the A&R man who signed Grayson to MCA Records (Paul Atkinson) was fired, and Hugh was dropped from the label, along with the other acts Atkinson had signed. In 1999, Hugh was forced to declare bankruptcy as a result of financial mismanagement by his business team.

Disillusioned, Hugh left the music industry and moved to North Carolina in 1994, where he formed Grayson Hugh & The Mooncussers. He continued to write music. Afterwards, he moved back northeast to take a job teaching songwriting at Berklee College of Music in Boston in 1999. While there, he was commissioned to compose scores for dance companies.

=== 2000s ===
As a result of stress and his mother's declining health, Hugh relapsed into alcoholism. In 2004, now broke, estranged from his family and friends, and living in a back room in a Cape Cod restaurant, Hugh suffered a near-fatal alcohol-induced seizure that left him hospitalized. In October 2004, he checked into a detox facility and shortly thereafter moved into a sober house in Wareham, Massachusetts.

In 2005, he began meeting with a rehabilitation councilor named Dean Gilmore who happened to be a fan of his. Gilmore convinced Hugh to return to creating music full-time to help maintain his sobriety and had his agency provide Hugh the seed money to record a new album. Hugh began writing and recording his comeback record, and returned to music full-time in 2007. In August 2008, Hugh married his backup singer Polly Messer. His recording An American Record was released on May 1, 2010.

=== 2010s ===
Since the release of An American Record, Grayson Hugh has been touring the U.S. and Europe. He released his new album Back to the Soul, a return to his southern soul roots, on August 12, 2015. Back to the Soul was on the Ballot for a 2015 Grammy in the Best Americana Album category. In August 2016, Hugh announced his new band Grayson Hugh & The Moon Hawks. Hugh is currently working on a new roots country album called "Save Your Love For Me", scheduled for a release to be announced.

=== 2020s ===
A New Zealand Tour had been planned for the Summer of 2020, but due to pandemic, that was cancelled, with the hope of rescheduling it. On November 1, 2020 Hugh, along with his wife singer Polly Messer, performed a live streaming concert at Caffé Lena, the legendary longest continually-running coffeehouse in Saratoga Springs, New York. In the Summer of 2019, Hugh began recording a new record called "Save Your Love For Me". Work on the album had to stop in the Winter of 2020 due to the global pandemic. Finally, in March 2025, Hugh released "Save Your Love For Me" world-wide in both digital and CD formats.

== Discography ==
=== Studio albums ===
| Title | Details | Peak chart positions | | | Certifications |
| Title | Details | US | AUS | NZ | Certifications |
|---|---|---|---|---|---|
| Grayson Hugh | Released: 1980; Label: Nineteen (NTN1219) | — | — | — | |
| Days Of Dreaming | Released: 1985; Label: River Soul Records | — | — | — | |
| Blind to Reason | Released: 1988; Label: RCA (7661-2-R) | 71 | 25 | 3 | ARIA: Gold |
| Road to Freedom | Released: 1992; Label: MCA (MCAD-10473) | — | — | — | |
| An American Record | Released: 2010; Label: Swamp Yankee Records | — | — | — | |
| Back to the Soul | Released: 2015; Label: Swamp Yankee Records | — | — | — | |
| Off the Road | Released: December 2020; Label: Swamp Yankee Records | — | — | — | |
| Save Your Love For Me | Released: March 2025; Label: River Soul Records | — | — | — | |
"—" denotes releases that did not chart or were not released in that territory.

=== Singles ===
List of singles, with selected chart positions
| Title | Year | Peak chart positions | | | | Certifications | Album |
| Title | Year | US | US A/C | AUS | NZ | Certifications | Album |
|---|---|---|---|---|---|---|---|
| "Tears of Love" | 1988 | — | — | — | — | | Blind to Reason |
| "Talk It Over" | 1988 | 19 | 9 | 4 | 3 | ARIA: Gold | Blind to Reason |
| "Bring It All Back" | 1989 | 87 | 9 | 88 | 37 | | Blind to Reason |
| "How 'Bout Us?" (duet with Betty Wright) | 1990 | 67 | 15 | 157 | — | | Blind to Reason |
| "Soul Cat Girl" | 1992 | — | — | — | — | | Road to Freedom |
"—" denotes releases that did not chart or were not released in that territory.
