= Our Favourite Pop =

Compilation album by paris match
- Released: January 24, 2007
- Genre: Pop
- Label: Victor Entertainment

Paris match chronology
after six (2006)	Our Favourite Pop (2007)	BEST OF PARIS MATCH (2007)

Our Favourite Pop is a pop compilation album released by the Japanese musical group paris match on January 24, 2007. The album's name and cover art are a homage to the British musical group The Style Council's album Our Favourite Shop.

== Track listing ==
1. "Party Down" (Little Beaver)
  - New release
2. "Digging Your Scene" (The Blow Monkeys)
  - New release
3. "(They Long To Be) Close To You" (The Carpenters)
  - Originally released on the album volume one
4. "Never Stop" (The Brand New Heavies)
  - New release
5. "There's Nothing Like This" -featuring Toku- (Omar)
  - Originally released on the album type III
6. "Let's Stay Together" (Al Green)
  - Originally released on the album ♭5
7. "A Woman Needs Love (Just Like You Do)" (Ray Parker Jr.)
  - New release
8. "All Around The World" (Lisa Stansfield)
  - New release
9. "Arthur's Theme (Best That You Can Do)" (Christopher Cross)
  - Originally released on the album QUATTRO
10. "I Want You To Want Me" (Cheap Trick)
  - New release
11. "Feel Like Makin' Love" (Roberta Flack)
  - Originally released on the album PM2
12. "Alison" (Elvis Costello)
  - New release

-Bonus Track-

1. "Family Affair" (Sly & The Family Stone) / Jazoulster
  - Originally released on Jazoulster's album play it cool Vol.1
2. "Never Stop" -STALKER STUDIO's sunny house treatment-
  - New release
3. "Family Affair" -M-SWIFT Remix- / Jazoulster
  - New release

== Personnel ==
- paris match – main performer
