= This Is Where We Live (album) =

Studio album by Paco
- Released: May 18, 2004
- Length: 38:51
- Label: Unfiltered
- Producer: Andy Chase; Michael Hampton

Paco chronology
Paco (2001)	This Is Where We Live (2004)

This Is Where We Live is the debut album by American band Paco. It was released on May 18, 2004 by Andy Chase's Unfiltered Records.

Professional ratings
Review scores
Source	Rating
AllMusic	4/5 stars
Pitchfork	6.4/10

== Track listing ==
Track listing gathered from AllMusic and the album's official liner notes.

No.	Title	Writer(s)	Length
1.	"Satie"	Michael Hampton; Gary Maurer	3:08
2.	"My Love"	Andy Chase; Dominique Durand; Hampton; Maurer	3:48
3.	"Shaded"	Chase; Durand; Hampton	3:58
4.	"Lie"	Hampton	3:32
5.	"Adore"	Chase; Durand; Hampton	4:43
6.	"Let It Go"	Chase; Durand; Hampton	3:39
7.	"Who Do You Think You Are?"	Chase; Durand; Hampton	4:13
8.	"Thin"	Hampton	3:49
9.	"Promises"	Chase; Durand; Hampton	3:33
10.	"Never"	Hampton	4:28
Total length:			38:51
