= It Doesn't Have to Be This Way =

Single by The Blow Monkeys

from the album She Was Only a Grocer's Daughter
- Released: 1987
- Recorded: 1986
- Length: 4:00
- Label: RCA/Ariola
- Songwriter: Dr. Robert
- Producers: Michael Baker for Simple Simon Inc. with help from The Axeman

The Blow Monkeys singles chronology
"Don't Be Scared" (1986)	"It Doesn't Have to Be This Way" (1987)	"Out with Her" (1987)

"It Doesn't Have to Be this Way" is a single released by British band the Blow Monkeys in early 1987. It is one of the band's best known singles, and hit the top 5 on the UK Singles Chart. The song was featured in the 1987 comedy film Police Academy 4: Citizens on Patrol.

== Charts ==
=== Weekly charts ===
Chart (1987)	Peak position
Australia (ARIA)	82
Canada (RPM)	92
Finland (The Official Finnish Charts)	18
Ireland (Irish Singles Chart)	6
Italy	44
Italy Airplay (Music & Media)	10
Netherlands	30
New Zealand	6
South Africa (Springbok)	8
Spain (AFYVE)	7
UK Singles Chart	5

=== Year-end charts ===
Chart (1987)	Position
New Zealand (Recorded Music NZ)	26
