= Realistic (album) =

Studio album by Ivy
- Released: February 14, 1995
- Recorded: 1994–95
- Genre: Indie pop
- Length: 44:47
- Label: Seed
- Producer: Andy Chase; Adam Schlesinger; Kurt Ralske

Ivy chronology
Lately (1994)	Realistic (1995)	Apartment Life (1997)

Singles from Apartment Life
- 1. "Get Enough" Released: 1994; 2. "Don't Believe a Word" Released: 1995

Professional ratings
Review scores
Source	Rating
AllMusic	3/5 stars
The Encyclopedia of Popular Music	3/5 stars
MusicHound Rock: The Essential Album Guide	3.5/5 stars

Realistic is the debut album by American indie pop band Ivy. It was released on February 14, 1995, by Seed Records. Musically, the album followed the material featured on Ivy's previous release, Lately; it was produced by Kurt Ralske with Ivy members Andy Chase and Adam Schlesinger.

Realistic received positive reviews from critics upon release, but was commercially unsuccessful; the album did not peak on any record chart, nor did the singles released from the album.

Three singles were released from the album. "Get Enough," the album's lead single, was released in 1994 to general acclaim from critics, especially in the United Kingdom, where it was promoted heavily. Single "Don't Believe a Word" was released in 1995 to highly positive reviews, but was less successful than "Get Enough." Promotional single "Beautiful" was also released in 1995.

== Critical reception ==
Realistic received mixed to favorable reviews from critics upon release. MusicHound Rock: The Essential Album Guide called the album "candy-coated by Chase's chiming guitars and awash in Durand's lovelorn daydreams."

== Singles ==
"Get Enough" was released as the album's lead single in 1994, followed by the release of Ivy's first extended play, Lately. The single received moderate success in the UK, where Melody Maker named the track "Single of the Week" shortly after its release.

"Don't Believe a Word" was the second single released from the album in 1995. The single was released in several formats, including as a CD single accompanied by B-sides "By Myself" and "An Ordinary."

"Beautiful" was the third and final single from Realistic, released in 1995 as a promotional single.

== Track listing ==
All songs written by Ivy and produced by Andy Chase and Adam Schlesinger, with additional production by Kurt Ralske.

No.	Title	Length
1.	"Get Enough"	2:41
2.	"No Guarantee"	3:06
3.	"Decay"	3:53
4.	"15 Seconds"	3:35
5.	"Everyday"	3:45
6.	"Point of View"	4:24
7.	"Don't Believe a Word"	2:48
8.	"Beautiful"	2:32
9.	"Shallow"	3:33
10.	"In the Shadows"	4:19
11.	"Dying Star"	3:46
12.	"Over"	6:34
Total length:		44:47
