= I've Got a Feeling (Ivy song) =

Single by Ivy

from the album Apartment Life
- Released: 1997
- Recorded: 1997
- Genre: Pop
- Length: 3:04
- Label: Atlantic
- Songwriters: Dominique Durand; Adam Schlesinger; Andy Chase
- Producers: Adam Schlesinger; Andy Chase; Lloyd Cole; Peter Nashel

Ivy singles chronology
"The Best Thing" (1997)	"I've Got a Feeling" (1997)	"This Is the Day" (1999)

"I've Got a Feeling" is a song by American band Ivy, recorded for their second studio album, Apartment Life (1997). It was released as the record's second single in the United States and Australia in 1997 and 1998 by Atlantic Records, respectively. The track was written by Dominique Durand, Adam Schlesinger and Andy Chase, with the latter two plus Lloyd Cole and Peter Nashel handling its production. It is a pop song accompanied by light vocals and a horn section, with Durand gently singing about falling in love, over several layers of guitars and relaxed harmonies.

It was released as a CD single in two different formats: one contains the album version and a remix of the track while the other features the bonus track "L'Anamour". Several music critics felt "I've Got a Feeling" would become a successful track for pop radio airplay if given the chance. A music video for the track was released in 1997 and features the band members performing inside and outside a photo booth. Other scenes show individuals entering the booth and departing with a CD in their hand.

== Background and release ==
"I've Got a Feeling" was taken from Ivy's second studio album, Apartment Life, released on October 7, 1997 by Atlantic Records. The track was released as the record's second single on the same date. The single was played on the television pilot of the American television series Felicity, and was included on the show's official soundtrack, released in 1999 by Hollywood Records. "I've Got a Feeling" was released as a CD single in Australia and the United States on October 7, 1997, approximately one month after the radio distribution of lead single "The Best Thing". Atlantic Records also handled this release, which consisted of a promotional CD with two versions of the track, and a commercial CD that includes two versions of "I've Got a Feeling" plus the bonus track "L'Anamour". Two remixes were created, one titled "Remix" and the other called "14th Street Mix". The bonus track, "L'Anamour", was written and produced by French musician Serge Gainsbourg. The track also appeared on the compilation album Pop Romantique: French Pop Classics (1999) and Ivy's fourth studio album, Guestroom (2002). The rendition of "I've Got a Feeling" that was released on the Japanese release of Apartment Life included additional production at the end, extending the song for an extra 19 seconds.

== Production and composition ==
"I've Got a Feeling" was written by Dominique Durand, Adam Schlesinger and Andy Chase, with Lloyd Cole and Peter Nashel handling additional production. Paul Q. Kolderie and Sean Slade served as the track's mixers, with Matthew Ellard's role being an assistant to them, and Bob Ludwig finalized the mastering. It is a pop song, supported by a horn section influenced by 1960s-style harmonies. Durand's vocals in "I've Got a Feeling" are light and subtle; according to Billboard's Larry Flick, they do not include any "unnecessary posturing or vocal noodling". The lyrics reference the feeling of falling in love. According to the liner notes of an advanced release of Apartment Life, the band members wanted to create compositions that followed their "trademark guitar-based arrangements" with additional instrumentation; a majority of the aforementioned production comes from multiple layers of guitars.

== Critical reception ==
Jack Rabid from AllMusic described the track as one of the "more lighthearted yet still crafted, cleanly produced, stylized old-pop with warmth" ones on Apartment Life. Flick of Billboard magazine was impressed by Cole and Nashel's production of the single, which he described as "sparkl[ing] with pop radio possibilities". He further predicted that "loyalists at rock radio will render this a major airwave smash". Similarly, MTV News' Frank Tortorici felt its "catchy pop" sound would "succeed at radio if given a chance". Referring to is as a whole, John C. Hughes from Pop Dose wrote that "I've Got a Feeling" was one of Ivy's works that "piled on layers of guitars" to produce a "beautiful, shimmering, three-minute masterpiece".

== Music video ==
A music video for "I've Got a Feeling" was created with an unknown release date. The video begins with Durand walking into a futuristic photo booth located in an open space surrounded by lanterns, while shots of the Ivy members, who are outside of the booth, are displayed. As Durand continues singing, several individuals enter and exit the room while getting their picture taken, each leaving with a CD in their hand. The Smashing Pumpkins guitarist James Iha makes a cameo appearance posing in the booth with members of the band. Durand sings into a microphone while Chase and Schlesinger play their guitars. For the final verse, Durand lowers her head to the microphone as the screen fades to black.

== Track listing and formats ==
- Promotional CD single
1. "I've Got a Feeling (14th Street Mix)" – 2:59
2. "I've Got a Feeling (Album Version)" – 3:04
- Australia and United States CD single
1. "I've Got a Feeling" – 3:04
2. "I've Got a Feeling (Remix)" – 2:55
3. "L'Anamour" – 2:39

== Personnel ==
Credits adapted from the liner notes of the "I've Got a Feeling" CD single.

- Andy Chase – engineering, executive producer, mixing
- Lloyd Cole – additional producer
- Dominique Durand – lead and background vocals
- Matthew Ellard – assistant mixing
- Paul Q. Kolderie – mixing
- Bob Ludwig – mastering
- Peter Nashel – additional producer
- Adam Schlesinger – executive producer, mixing
- Sean Slade – mixing

== Release history ==
Region	Date	Format	Label
United States	October 7, 1997	Promotional CD single	Atlantic
United States	October 7, 1997	CD single	Atlantic
Australia	1998	CD single	Atlantic
