= Springtime for the World =

Studio album by The Blow Monkeys
- Released: 25 June 1990
- Recorded: 1989
- Genre: New wave; EDM; pop rock
- Length: 44:58 (LP); 49:24 (MC); 54:02 (CD)
- Label: RCA; Ariola; BMG
- Producer: Dr. Robert; Hector

The Blow Monkeys chronology
Choices – The Singles Collection (1989)	Springtime for the World (1990)	Blow Monkeys the Masters (1997)

Singles from Springtime for the World
- 1. "Springtime for the World" Released: February 1990; 2. "La Passionara" Released: April 1990; 3. "If You Love Somebody" Released: 1990

Professional ratings
Review scores
Source	Rating
AllMusic	link
New Musical Express	7/10
Select	2/5

Springtime for the World is the fifth album by British band The Blow Monkeys, released in 1990. The work represented the band's ultimate transformation into a dance music act, a direction the band had been gradually moving since their biggest hit single, "It Doesn't Have to Be This Way" (number 5 in the UK Singles Chart in 1987), and the album it was taken from, She Was Only a Grocer's Daughter.

The album's title track, "Springtime for the World", reached number 69 in the UK Singles Chart.

== Track listing ==
All tracks composed by Dr. Robert (Robert Howard), except where noted.

1. "In Too Deep" – 4:33
2. "Springtime for the World" – 3:25
3. "Vibe Alive!" – 2:50
4. "Reflections '89" – 2:57
5. "Be Not Afraid" (Robert Howard, Cheb Khaled) - 6:54
6. "If You Love Somebody" – 5:08
7. "La Passionara" – 4:43
8. "Let the People Dance" – 3:43
9. "Fruits of the Earth" – 4:43
10. "As the Dust Settles" – 6:02
11. "Checking Out" – 4:56 [CD/MC only]
12. "The Other Side of You" (Howard, Kiley, Anker, Henry) - 4:38 [CD only]

== Singles taken from the album ==
- "Springtime for the World" (1990) (UK Singles Chart No. 69)
- "La Passionara" [Remix] (1990)
- "If You Love Somebody" [Remix] (1990)

=== The Springtime for the World EP ===
The three songs above were also released on a joint double A-side four-track EP, collectively entitled Springtime for the World, featuring two alternative versions of "If You Love Somebody".

1. (A1) "Springtime for the World"
2. (A2) "La Passionara"
3. (AA1) "If You Love Somebody" [Musto & Bones 12"]
4. (AA2) "If You Love Somebody" [Musto & Bones Dub]

== Personnel ==
The Blow Monkeys

- Dr. Robert – vocals, piano, guitar
- Mick Anker – bass guitar
- Neville Henry – saxophone
- Tony Kiley – drums

Other musicians

- Cheb Khaled – lead vocals (track 5)
- Barbara Snow – trumpet and brass arrangement (track 5)
- Brian Bethell – guitar
- Sylvia Mason, Mary Cassidy – background vocals
- Simon Watson – Spanish guitar (track 7)

Production

- Dr. Robert and Hector for Springtime for the World Productions – production
- Andy Mason – engineering
- Ritchie Fermie for Bamn Productions – remix (track 8)
- Tommy Musto & Frankie Bones for Northcott/JSE Productions – additional production and mix (tracks AA1, AA2)
- Mike Rodgers – mix engineering (tracks AA1, AA2) at "D&D Studios", New York City

Staff

- Kate Garner – photography
- Paul McGarvey, Katie & Deirdre – RCA personnel

== Release details ==
Album

Country	Date	Label	Format	Catalogue
UK	1990	RCA/BMG/Ariola	CD	PD 74539
UK	1990	RCA/BMG/Ariola	LP	PL 7459
UK	1990	RCA/BMG/Ariola	MC	PK 74539

Maxi-single

Country	Date	Label	Format	Catalogue
UK	1990	RCA/BMG/Ariola	EP	PT 43626
