= You Don't Know Anything =

Single by Ivy

from the album Apartment Life
- Released: April 29, 1999
- Recorded: 1997
- Studio: The Place, Duotone Studios, Compositions (New York City)
- Genre: Pop rock; indie rock
- Length: 3:45
- Label: Atlantic Records
- Songwriter(s): Dominique Durand; Adam Schlesinger; Andy Chase
- Producer(s): Andy Chase; Adam Schlesinger; Peter Nashel

Ivy singles chronology
"This Is the Day" (1998)	"You Don't Know Anything" (1999)	"Lucy Doesn't Love You" (2000)

"You Don't Know Anything" is a song by American indie rock band Ivy. It was released by Atlantic Records on April 29, 1999 as the fourth and final single from their second studio album, Apartment Life (1997). The single was made available exclusively in Europe and featured the same two B-sides as previous single, "This Is the Day", which had been released by 550 Music in Austria. The track was written by Dominique Durand, Adam Schlesinger and Andy Chase while production was handled by the latter two and Peter Nashel.

Released alongside "This Is the Day", "You Don't Know Anything" received promotion by Atlantic Records after the former track was included on the soundtrack for the 1998 film, There's Something About Mary. The recording received generally favorable reviews from music critics who compared the song to the works of Irish rock group My Bloody Valentine.

== Background and composition ==
"You Don't Know Anything" was written by Ivy band members Dominique Durand, Adam Schlesinger and Andy Chase. The production of the track was handled by Chase and Schlesinger, with additional production provided by Peter Nashel. Musically, "You Don't Know Anything" is a pop rock/indie rock song, also incorporating elements of indie pop and guitar accords. Lyrically, the song discusses a lover being "clueless" and "in the wrong".

The single was heavily compared to My Bloody Valentine; in their review of the track, Sputnikmusic stated that it "comes off like a My Bloody Valentine song with intelligible vocals, with a sliding, reverb heavy hook and pummeling drums", while AllMusic writer Jack Rabid drew similar comparisons. Patrick Carmosino of Consumable Online stated that with "You Don't Know Anything", Ivy "have an indie-ethic rock side that compliments their pop sensibilities to the tee".

== Release ==
The recording was released simultaneously with the release of the single "This Is the Day"; this occurred after the latter track was featured in the 1998 film, There's Something About Mary. "You Don't Know Anything" was released as a CD single exclusively in European countries; the CD included two B-side tracks, "Sleeping Late" and "Sweet Mary".

== Critical reception ==
"You Don't Know Anything" received generally positive reviews from music critics. Stephen Thompson of The A.V. Club praised the track and Apartment Life for "sound[ing] slickly pretty and mannered". AllMusic named the song "a knockout" and praised it for allowing "the guitars [to] get mean". Reviewer Scott Floman was more mixed with his review, finding the track to "pass by pleasantly but unremarkably".

== Track listing ==
European CD single
No.	Title	Length
1.	"You Don't Know Anything"	3:45
2.	"Sleeping Late"	2:30
3.	"Sweet Mary"	3:14

== Credits and personnel ==
Credits and personnel adapted from "You Don't Know Anything" liner notes and Andy Chase's discography.

Recording

- Recorded at The Place, New York City; Duotone Studios, New York City; and Compositions, New York City

Personnel

- Andy Chase – engineering, executive producer, mixing
- Dominique Durand – lead and background vocals
- Matthew Ellard – assistant mixing
- Philippe Garcia – photography
- Josh Grier – legal advisor
- James Iha – background vocals, additional production
- Paul Q. Kolderie – mixing
- Bob Ludwig – mastering
- Q Prime – management
- Brenda Rotheiser – art direction, design
- Adam Schlesinger – engineering, executive producer, mixing
- Sean Slade – mixing

== Release history ==
Region	Date	Format	Label
Europe	April 29, 1999	CD single	Atlantic Records
