= Paris Match (band) =

Japanese band

paris match
- Origin: Japan
- Genres: Shibuya-kei, jazz, soul
- Years active: 1998 - present
- Labels: JVC Entertainment (2000-)
- Members: Mari Mizuno; Yosuke Sugiyama
- Past members: Tai Furusawa
- Website: Official website Instagram

paris match (パリス・マッチ, Parisu Matchi) is a Japanese musical group formed in 1998 by composer/arranger Yosuke Sugiyama and lyricist Tai Furusawa with vocalist Mari Mizuno. They debuted in 2000 with the album volume one. The group's name is a homage to the British musical group The Style Council, whose album Café Bleu features a song titled "The Paris Match".

The music of paris match is a fusion of diverse musical genres including bossa nova, jazz, acid-jazz, soul, blue-eyed soul, AOR, and house.

== Discography ==
=== Albums ===
- Volume One (April 21, 2000)
- PM2 (August 1, 2001)
- Type III (June 1, 2002)
- Quattro (June 25, 2003)
- ♭5 (July 16, 2004)
- After Six (March 24, 2006)
- Flight 7 (February 13, 2008)
- Passion8 (June 24, 2009)
- to the nines (October 6, 2010)
- edition 10 (November 21, 2012)
- 11 (December 16, 2015)
- ROUND 12 (June 24, 2020)
- Le 13e (August 6, 2025)

=== EP ===
- Song for You (November 21, 2002)

=== Compilation and reissue albums ===
- Volume One Plus (April 21, 2004)
- 5th Anniversary (March 30, 2005)
- Our Favourite Pop (January 24, 2007)
- BEST OF PARIS MATCH (June 20, 2007)
- All Time Classics (December 11, 2019)
- Our Favourite Pop II - Tokyo Style (November 23, 2022)

=== Singles ===
- "Happy-go-round" (November 22, 2000)
- "Desert Moon" (April 4, 2001)
- "Kiss" (July 18, 2001)
- "Deep Inside" (November 21, 2001)
- "Saturday" (June 5, 2002)
- "Summer Breeze" (July 23, 2003)
- "Taiyō no kiss" (太陽の接吻) (November 5, 2003)
- "Koi no kizashi" (恋の兆し) (March 24, 2005)
- "Voice" (November 23, 2005)
