= The Best Thing (Ivy song) =

Single by Ivy

from the album Apartment Life
- B-side: "A Nanny in Manhattan"
- Released: September 1997
- Recorded: 1997
- Studio: The Place, Duotone Studios, Compositions (New York City)
- Genre: Pop
- Length: 3:43
- Label: Atlantic
- Songwriters: Dominique Durand; Adam Schlesinger; Andy Chase
- Producers: Adam Schlesinger; Andy Chase

Ivy singles chronology
"I Hate December" (1996)	"The Best Thing" (1997)	"I've Got a Feeling" (1997)

"The Best Thing" is a song by American band Ivy on their second studio album, Apartment Life (1997). Released in September 1997 by Atlantic Records, it was the band's major-label debut single and served as the parent album's lead single. The track was written by Dominique Durand, Adam Schlesinger and Andy Chase, and was produced by the latter two. A pop song, "The Best Thing" is accompanied by several guitars and a keyboard.

It was distributed to radio stations for airplay in September 1997, coinciding with the release of two CD singles. Rumors of a music video for the single circulated during the same month, although one was ultimately never released. "The Best Thing" was also pressed as a 7" jukebox single in Italy, where it was paired with the B-side track "A Nanny in Manhattan", performed by the American band Lilys. music critics praised "The Best Thing", with several calling it one of the catchiest tracks on Apartment Life.

== Background and release ==
"The Best Thing" was taken from Ivy's second studio album, Apartment Life, which was released on October 7, 1997 by Atlantic Records. It was recorded in 1997 in New York City at three different recording studios. The single was released in three formats; the commercial CD single includes the album version of "The Best Thing" while a promotional Italy 7" jukebox single, released by East West Records, used Ivy's song as the A-side and Lilys' "A Nanny in Manhattan" as the B-side. Another promotional CD single was also created containing the "Video Remix" of the track.

According to the liner notes of the promotional release, Atlantic Records billed "The Best Thing" as Ivy's official debut single. Following its distribution as a physical single, "The Best Thing" was serviced to modern rock and modern adult contemporary radio stations beginning September 12, 1997. The record label had hoped that Ivy would receive considerable radio airplay, in light of musical trends during the same time period when Apartment Life was scheduled to be released. Michael Krumper, the vice president of product development for Atlantic Records, predicted this, given that "there are a number of records that have a similar feel to Ivy".

Prior to the scheduled release date for Apartment Life, Ivy was scheduled for a promotional radio tour in September 1997. Around this same time, Billboard announced that a music video for "The Best Thing" would complete filming and production by the end of the same month; however, an official video was never released for the single, despite another Billboard article describing preparations for filming in November of that same year.

== Composition and production ==
"The Best Thing" was written by Dominique Durand, Adam Schlesinger and Andy Chase, with the latter two also serving as producers. Paul Q. Kolderie and Sean Slade contributed as the mixers, with Matthew Ellard serving as an assistant mixer; Bob Ludwig finalized the mastering and James Iha contributed backing vocals to the track. It was recorded in New York City in 1997 at three recording studios: The Place, Duotone Studios, and Compositions. A pop song, it features "rippling atmospherics" and a "punk-ish guitar", with a user from Sputnikmusic commenting that it may have been influenced by the American band Pixies. Its production consists of a "briskly strummed" acoustic guitar and a triplet-playing keyboard. Durand "stretch[es] out each syllable" while singing in a style that is reminiscent of the German musician Nico during the lyrics: "She's driving fast / She took the family car / She's getting high / She's never slipped so far". As the chorus begins, she repeats "It's the best thing / She's ever had" regularly alongside several guitars.

== Critical reception ==
"The Best Thing" was praised by music critics. AllMusic's Jack Rabid was extremely positive, calling it a "true single with a chorus that is to swoon and croon for". Vickie Gilmer and Ira Robbins from Trouser Press described the song as an "engaging opener" and lauded it and album track "I've Got a Feeling" for being catchy. Frank Tortorici from MTV News agreed, and predicted that it would likely "succeed at radio if given a chance". Calling it "sensuous", Stephen Thompson from The A.V. Club claimed that the rest of Apartment Life does not match the quality of "The Best Thing", but also stated that the entire album "never slips too far" because the end product includes "impeccably tasteful performances".

== Track listings and formats ==
- CD single
1. "The Best Thing" – 3:43
- CD single 2
1. "The Best Thing (Video Remix)" – 3:43
- Italy jukebox 7" single

A1. "The Best Thing" – 3:38
B1. "A Nanny in Manhattan" (performed by Lilys) – 1:45

== Credits and personnel ==
Management

- Recorded at The Place, New York City; Duotone Studios, New York City; and Compositions, New York City

Personnel

- Andy Chase – engineering, executive producer, mixing
- Dominique Durand – lead and background vocals
- Matthew Ellard – assistant mixing
- Josh Grier – legal
- James Iha – background vocals, additional production
- Paul Q. Kolderie – mixing
- Bob Ludwig – mastering
- Q Prime – management
- Adam Schlesinger – engineering, executive producer, mixing
- Sean Slade – mixing

Credits and personnel adapted from Apartment Life.
