= Choices – The Singles Collection =

Greatest hits album by The Blow Monkeys
- Released: 7 August 1989
- Recorded: 1984–1989
- Label: RCA; Ariola; BMG
- Producer: Dr. Robert; Adam Moseley; Peter Wilson; Michael Baker & The Axeman; Stephen Hague; Juan Atkins; Paul Witts/Egor

The Blow Monkeys chronology
Whoops! There Goes the Neighbourhood (1988)	Choices – The Singles Collection (1989)	Springtime for the World (1990)

Professional ratings
Review scores
Source	Rating
AllMusic	4.5/5 stars

Choices – The Singles Collection is a greatest hits album by British band The Blow Monkeys, released in 1989 by RCA and distributed by BMG / Ariola. The album includes most of the band's singles and features genres from the new wave of their debut album to pop rock and funky evolution, up to their discovery of the potentialities of the new dance revolution, a genre that they embraced on their final album, Springtime for the World, which was released the following year, shortly before they split up.

== Composition ==
Two editions of the album were released: the vinyl version only included the first 10 songs (from "Wait" to "It Pays to Belong"), whereas the CD version contained six more songs, also presenting the singles from their 1984 debut album, Limping for a Generation, which didn't chart in the UK Top 75, as well as two 12" remixes of "Wait" and the title-track "Choice?", and the first single taken from their 1986 second album, "Forbidden Fruit", which also didn't make it into the UK charts – it was released a short time before the group obtained their very first smash hit with the single "Digging Your Scene", reaching number 12 in March 1986.

The album also includes their only UK Top Ten hit as a band, "It Doesn't Have to Be This Way", which reached number 5, in January 1987. The other big hit for the group was "Wait", reaching number 7 in January 1989, although the song was credited only to The Blow Monkeys' lead singer Dr Robert's real name, Robert Howard, along with Chicago house singer Kym Mazelle. "Wait" also appears on the band's fourth album, Whoops! There Goes the Neighbourhood, as well as Mazelle's album, Crazy.

The collection contains three more duets: "Celebrate (The Day After You)", with Curtis Mayfield (a favourite of Dr. Robert), and the latest 1989 singles, "Choice?" and "Slaves No More", with vocalist Sylvia Tella, which were previously unreleased when the album came out. The title-track got to number 22 in the UK Singles Chart, one of two Top 30 hits from the group (the other being the soulful ballad "Out with Her", which reached number 30). The 1989 dance remix of "This Is Your Life", the version featured on this album, went to number 32 in April of that year – the original peaked at number 70 in August 1988.

Minor hits were "Wicked Ways" (from the band's 1986 album Animal Magic), which reached number 60, the duet with Curtis Mayfield, "Celebrate (The Day After You)", number 52, and "Some Kind of Wonderful", which reached number 67 – both taken from The Blow Monkeys' album, She Was Only a Grocer's Daughter – and "Slaves No More", which reached number 73. The compilation does not contain the group's 1984 RCA début single "Go Public", nor the 1986 single "Don't Be Scared of Me", which didn't chart, but does include 1988's "It Pays to Belong", which also didn't chart. The title-track, "Choice?", and the 1989 UK number 7 duet with Kym Mazelle, "Wait", are considered today as anticipatory of what would later be defined as the UK garage musical subgenre.

== Commercial success ==
Choices – The Singles Collection peaked at number 5 in the UK Albums Chart, their highest chart position.

== Track listing ==
Words and music by Dr. Robert, except track 13 by Dr. Robert/Mick Anker

1. "Wait" (1989) from Whoops! There Goes the Neighbourhood
2. "Choice?" (1989) Previously unreleased
3. "Slaves No More" (1989) Previously unreleased
4. "Celebrate (The Day After You)" (1987) from She Was Only a Grocer's Daughter
5. "Wicked Ways" (1986) from Animal Magic
6. "Digging Your Scene" (1986) from Animal Magic
7. "It Doesn't Have to Be This Way" (1987) from She Was Only a Grocer's Daughter
8. "Out With Her" (1987) from She Was Only a Grocer's Daughter
9. "This Is Your Life" (1988) from Whoops! There Goes the Neighbourhood
10. "It Pays to Belong" (1988) from Whoops! There Goes the Neighbourhood
11. "Wait" (Long) (1988) from Whoops! There Goes the Neighbourhood
12. "Choice?" (Long) (1989) Previously unreleased
13. "Man from Russia" (1984) from Limping for a Generation
14. "Atomic Lullaby" (1984) from Limping for a Generation
15. "Wildflower" (1984) from Limping for a Generation
16. "Forbidden Fruit" (1985) from Animal Magic

== Personnel ==
Adapted from AllMusic.

- Mick Anker – bass guitar
- Juan Atkins – producer, remixing
- Axeman – assistant producer
- Michael Baker – mixing, producer
- Brian Bethell – guitar
- Stephen Hague – producer
- Neville Henry – saxophone
- Robert Howard (Dr. Robert) – guitar, piano, producer, programming, vocals
- Tony Kiley – drums, machines
- Andy Mason – engineer
- Curtis Mayfield – vocals
- Kym Mazelle – vocals
- Adam Moseley – producer
- Barbara Snow – flugelhorn, trumpet
- Sylvia Tella – vocals
- Peter Wilson – producer

== Additional singles taken from the album ==
- "Choice?" (1989) [UK Singles Chart: Number 22]
- "Slaves No More" (1989) [UK Singles Chart: Number 73]

=== Additional singles track listing ===
"Choice?"

- 7" and cassette single: "Choice?" / "Oh Yeah!"
- 12" maxi single: "Choice?" (Remix) / "Choice?" (Dub) / "Choice?"
- CD single: "Choice?" (Short) / "Choice?" (Long) / "Oh Yeah!"

"Slaves No More"

- 7" and cassette single: "Slaves No More" / "What's That?"
- 12" maxi single: "Slaves No More" (Long) / "Slaves No More" (Short) / "What's That?"
- 2nd 12" maxi single: "Slaves No More" (Long – Extra Special Remix) / "Slaves No More" (Short) / "What's That?"
- CD single: "Slaves No More" (Short) / "Slaves No More" (Long) / "What's That?"

== VHS video release ==
Choices – The Video Collection was also issued in 1989, to complement the album release.

== Release details ==
Country	Date	Label	Format	Catalog
UK	1989	RCA/Ariola/BMG	CD	PD 74191
