= Paco (band) =

- Origin: New York City, New York, United States
- Years active: 2001–2005
- Label: Unfiltered
- Members: Dominique Durand; Andy Chase; Michael Hampton; Gary Maurer

Paco was an American indie rock band consisting of musicians Dominique Durand, Andy Chase, Michael Hampton and Gary Maurer. Their 2004 album This Is Where We Live was released by Chase's Unfiltered Records and was ranked in the lower positions of CMJ New Music Monthly's "Top 200 Radio" chart in mid-2004. The group formed during Durand's first pregnancy when she, Chase and Adam Schlesinger had completed work on their 2000 album Long Distance.

== Discography ==
title	Album details
This Is Where We Live	Released: May 18, 2004 (US); Label: Unfiltered; Format: CD, digital download
