= Limping for a Generation =

Studio album by The Blow Monkeys
- Released: 1984
- Genre: New wave, glam rock, jazz, punk rock
- Length: 40:10
- Label: RCA/Ariola/BMG
- Producer: Peter Wilson

The Blow Monkeys chronology
Limping for a Generation (1984)	Animal Magic (1986)

1986 Reissue
- 1986 Cover

Limping for a Generation is the 1984 debut album by the British band The Blow Monkeys.

In the booklet to 1999 Atomic Lullabies – Very Best of the Blow Monkeys, lead singer Dr. Robert (born Robert Howard) categorized the record as jazz-punk, and defined The Blow Monkeys' early production by simply stating, in the same source: "Our early music was raw".

Formed in 1981, the group, after a one-off indie single, signed to RCA, and released Limping for a Generation.

The Blow Monkeys had only one external helper for this album: Pete Wilson, for production, string arrangements and additional keyboards).

Three of the four singles taken from their debut album, "Man from Russia", "Atomic Lullaby" and "Wildflower", can be found on their compilation album Choices - The Singles Collection, released in 1989. The later 1999 collection contains instead five B-sides from the 1984 album. As Dr. Robert writes, "[they] show us at our most relaxed and spontaneous ... and give a more rounded picture of what was really the most important thing to us... the music".

In the wake of The Blow Monkeys' later success, RCA reissued Limping for a Generation in 1986 with a new sleeve design. In 2012, Cherry Red announced the release of a 2-CD deluxe edition with a whole bonus disc of previously unissued demos and B-sides.

== Track listing ==
All tracks composed by Dr. Robert (Robert Howard); except where noted

1. "He's Shedding Skin" - 4:04
2. "Wildflower" - 3:00
3. "Atomic Lullaby" - 5:02
4. "Fatcat Belusha" (Howard, Mick Anker) - 4:15
5. "Go Public" - 4:30
6. "Professor Super Cool" - 4:00
7. "The Man from Russia" (Howard, Mick Anker) - 3:15
8. "Limping for a Generation" - 3:32
9. "Waiting for Mr. Moonlight" - 4:22
10. "Trashtown Incident" - 4:10

== Singles from the album ==
- "Go Public" (1984)
- "Man from Russia" (1984)
- "Atomic Lullaby" (1984)
- "Wildflower" (1985)

== B-Sides ==
- "Rub-a-dub Shanka" (1984; B-Side to "Go Public")
- "Resurrection Love" (1984; B-Side to "Man from Russia" single)
- "Slither" (1984; B-Side to "Man from Russia" maxi single)
- "My Twisty Jewel" (1984; B-Side to "Atomic Lullaby" single)
- "Kill the Pig" (1984; B-Side to "Atomic Lullaby" maxi single)

== Personnel ==
The Blow Monkeys

- Dr. Robert - vocals, guitars, piano
- Tony Kiley - drums, percussion
- Neville Henry - tenor saxophone, alto saxophone
- Mick Anker - electric bass, acoustic bass

Technical

- Peter Wilson - production, string arrangements, additional keyboards
- Andrew Christian - art direction
- Andrew Ekins - cover illustration
- Nick Knight - photography

== Release details ==
Country	Date	Label	Format	Catalog
UK	1984	RCA/Ariola/BMG	CD	ND 71495
