= Whoops! There Goes the Neighbourhood =

Studio album by The Blow Monkeys
- Released: 30 January 1989
- Genre: Pop rock; dance
- Length: 52:55 (LP); 70:07 (CD)
- Label: RCA; BMG; Ariola
- Producer: Dr. Robert; Stephen Hague; Leon F Sylvers III; Julian Mendelsohn; The Blow Monkeys with Marius de Vries

The Blow Monkeys chronology
She Was Only a Grocer's Daughter (1987)	Whoops! There Goes the Neighbourhood (1989)	Choices - The Singles Collection (1989)

Singles from Whoops! There Goes the Neighbourhood
- 1. "This Is Your Life" Released: August 1988; 2. "It Pays to Belong" Released: October 1988; 3. "Wait!" Released: January 1989; 4. "This Is Your Life '89" Released: March 1989

Professional ratings
Review scores
Source	Rating
Allmusic	2/5 stars

Whoops! There Goes the Neighbourhood was The Blow Monkeys' 1989 follow-up album to She Was Only a Grocer's Daughter, released two years before.

The album, the fourth issued from the band, represented a further step towards the incorporation of more dancey elements, started with their third 1987 LP, especially with the UK hit "It Doesn't Have to Be That Way", which, getting to Number 5, made that their highest-charting song ever.

The first single was "This Is Your Life" continued the pop funk style but failed chart wise and reached no. 70 in the UK. The second single, the politically oriented "It Pays to Belong", following Dr. Robert's tradition of criticising England's political reality also did not chart in the UK Top 75. A change of style to house the lead singer scored a hit together with soul singer Kym Mazelle, which reached Number 7 in early 1989. Subsequently, the album tracklist was quickly rejigged, "Wait" recredited as a Blow Monkeys song and included on the album, together with a house styled reworked version of "This Is Your Life". The original version was added to the CD version, and miscredited as a "1988 remix". The popular at that instant Ten City were given the job of remixing "This Is Your Life" and it fared slightly better, reaching Number 32 in the UK singles chart.

The original track listing is still reflected in the order of the lyrics in the CD booklet and on the vinyl inner sleeve. As planned before the inclusion of "Wait" and the "This Is Your Life" remix, the track list went:

1. "It Pays to Belong"
2. "No Woman Is an Island"
3. "This Is Your Life" (original version, aka the 1988 "remix")
4. "Mercy, Pity, Peace and Love"
5. "Come On Down"
6. "Squaresville"
7. "Sweet Talking Rapist at Home"
8. "Bombed into the Stoneage"
9. "Let's Emigrate"
10. "The Love of Which I Dare Not Speak"

The initially released version of the album, with its 10 tracks (on the vinyl edition), can be ideally divided into two parts, more or less corresponding to the two sides: the first displays more traditionally pop-rock tunes (also embracing the first two tracks of Side 2), approximately lasting 3 to 5 minutes; the second presents instead more new wave-oriented tracks, the timings of which are much longer, 6 to 8 minutes. In perfect accordance with the group's habit of describing their home country's social life, most of the lyrics deal with such topics, though there is not a particular unifying theme here, as in the previous disc, which made that a real concept album, against Thatcher's iron politics.

The final CD edition included three bonus tracks; the original version of "This Is Your Life", its B-side, "The Love of Which I Dare Not Speak" (having been bumped off the final album for time reasons) and an extended mix of the album track "Squaresville".

== Track listing ==
Words and music: Dr. Robert

1. "This Is Your Life" – 4:37
2. "Wait" [Robert Howard with Kym Mazelle] – 3:08
3. "No Woman Is an Island" – 4:19
4. "It Pays to Belong" – 5:35
5. "Mercy, Pity, Peace and Love" – 3:45
6. "Squaresville" – 4:22
7. "Come On Down" – 5:02
8. "Sweet Talking Rapist at Home" – 7:38
9. "Bombed into the Stoneage" – 6:01
10. "Let's Emigrate" – 8:28
11. "The Love of Which I Dare Not Speak" (CD Only) – 3:59
12. "This Is Your Life" ['88] (CD Only) – 5:11
13. "Squaresville" [Longer] (CD Only) – 8:02

== Singles taken from the album ==
- "This Is Your Life" (August 1988) (UK Singles Chart no. 70)
- "It Pays to Belong" (October 1988)
- "Wait" (January 1989) (UK Singles Chart no. 7)
- "This Is Your Life" [Remix] (March 1989) (UK Singles Chart no. 32)

== Quotations ==
The booklet, as usual, highlights the various religious inclinations of Dr. Robert, who thanks either Buddha and God, inviting them to "Come on down!" (as in the title of track 7), and, above all, it underlines the political flavour of the work, both featuring a quotation from Wilhelm Reich, which goes like this:

"If the psychic energies of the average mass of people watching a Football game or a musical comedy could be diverted into the Rational channels of a Freedom Movement, They would be invincible."

— Wilhelm Reich

and also informing fans and buyers in general, that:

This record is NOT for sale in South Africa!

— The Blow Monkeys in the booklet of their 1988 album Whoops! There Goes the Neighbourhood

== Personnel ==
The Blow Monkeys

- Dr Robert - vocals and guitars; co-composition of all strings and brass parts
- Neville Henry - saxophones
- Mick Anker - bass guitar
- Tony Kiley - drums and drum machines

Musicians

- Kym Mazelle - female lead vocals on track 2
- Marius De Vries - keyboards, computer programming, co-composition and scoring of all strings and brass parts
- Brian Bethell - additional guitar
- Steve Sydelnik - percussion
- The Kick Horns - brass

=== Production ===
- Dr Robert - production on tracks 1 & 2
- Stephen Hague - production on tracks 4, 6, 12 & 13
- Leon F Sylvers III for Studio 56 Productions: production on tracks 3, 5, 7 & 8
- Julian Mendelsohn - production on tracks 9 & 10
- The Blow Monkeys & Marius de Vries - production on track 11

=== Staff ===
- Alistair Thain - photography
- Barnaby's Photo Library - additional photography
- Michael Nash Associates - design

== Charts ==
Chart performance for Whoops! There Goes the Neighbourhood
Chart (1989)	Peak position
German Albums (Offizielle Top 100)	64
New Zealand Albums (RMNZ)	49
Swedish Albums (Sverigetopplistan)	29
UK Albums (OCC)	46

== Release details ==
Country	Date	Label	Format	Catalogue
UK	1988	RCA/BMG/Ariola	CD	PD 71858
UK	1988	RCA/BMG/Ariola	MC	PK 71858
UK	1988	RCA/BMG/Ariola	LP	PL 71858
