= Apartment Life =

Studio album by Ivy
- Released: October 6, 1997
- Recorded: 1997
- Studios: Compositions (New York City); Duotone Studios (New York City); The Place (New York City)
- Genres: Indie pop; indie rock
- Length: 44:30
- Label: Atlantic
- Producers: Andy Chase; Adam Schlesinger; Peter Nashel

Ivy chronology
Realistic (1995)	Apartment Life (1997)	Long Distance (2000)

Singles from Apartment Life
- 1. "The Best Thing" Released: September 12, 1997; 2. "I've Got a Feeling" Released: October 7, 1997; 3. "This Is the Day" Released: October 19, 1998; 4. "You Don't Know Anything" Released: April 29, 1999

Apartment Life is the second studio album by American band Ivy, released by Atlantic Records on October 6, 1997. After being dropped from Seed Records following the release of Realistic in 1995, the group signed to Atlantic due to connections that Adam Schlesinger had with the record label. In addition to band members Andy Chase and Schlesinger, the album was produced by Lloyd Cole and Peter Nashel. In contrast to their previous releases, such as Lately (1994) and Realistic, Apartment Life is a pop album with varying forms of production consisting of keyboards, brass, and string instruments. Some of the compositions featured on the record were compared to the works of My Bloody Valentine, Pixies, and the Smiths. To promote the album, Ivy embarked on a series of promotional tours across the United States.

Considered an improvement over 1995's Realistic, the album received praise from music critics. A columnist from Billboard would go on to rank Apartment Life as the seventh best album released in 1997. Commercially, its frequent playback from college radio programmers allowed it to enter the airplay charts compiled by CMJ New Music Monthly. "The Best Thing", "I've Got a Feeling", "This Is the Day", and "You Don't Know Anything" were released as the album's four singles. "This Is the Day" drew attention to the group after being featured on the soundtrack to the 1998 film There's Something About Mary. It would later be included on various compilation albums. Following their drop from Atlantic Records and transfer to 550 Music, a reissued version of the album was released in 1999. A special release in Japan headed by Epic Records also took place in the same year and features two previously unreleased bonus tracks.

== Background and development ==
In 1994, Andy Chase and Dominique Durand met through an advertisement to record music together. Following the completion of several songs, the pair invited Adam Schlesinger to join them and form Ivy. Together they wrote and produced "Get Enough" (1994), which was well received by the public, and released their debut extended play in the same year, titled Lately. While signed to Seed Records, they recorded Realistic, which was distributed in the United States in 1995. Shortly after its release, the label dropped Ivy, prompting Schlesinger to claim that "Seed was kind of the worst of both worlds because it didn't really have any credibility and it didn't really have any money". Because of Schlesinger's involvement as a member of Fountains of Wayne, he had established a strong business relationship with Atlantic Records and would eventually sign with them, who provided funding for Ivy to record a second studio album.

Apartment Life was released on October 6, 1997, by Atlantic Records. While promoting Apartment Life across the United States, Ivy was dropped from Atlantic Records. Following their departure from the label in 1998, Ivy signed to 550 Music who reissued the album in the United States with a new cover art and digitally remastered tracks. Simultaneously, both Schlesinger and Chase worked on opening up a new recording studio in New York City, Stratosphere Studios, in June 1999. During this time, a deluxe edition was distributed in Japan by Epic Records, featuring two previously unreleased tracks: "Sleeping Late" and "Sweet Mary".

== Music and songs ==
According to music critics, Apartment Life served as a musical departure and improvement from the material found on their previous efforts. CMJ New Music Monthly's Kurt B. Reighley described the album as a collection as an improvement from the "invigorating pop" that appeared on Realistic. He also noted the wide variety of sounds present in the production, consisting of brass, keyboards, and string instruments. Additionally, the album contains influence from dance-rock, jazz, and reggae music.

The album opens with "The Best Thing", a pop song with a "chorus that is to swoon and croon for". It features "rippling atmospherics", a "punk-ish guitar", and similar qualities to the music of American band Pixies. Another pop track, the production of "I've Got a Feeling" is accompanied by a horn section influenced by 1960s-style harmonies. Durand's vocals in the track are light and airy, and according to Billboard's Larry Flick, they do not include any "unnecessary posturing or vocal noodling". In addition to Chase and Schlesinger, Lloyd Cole and Peter Nashel received credits as co-writers on the track. Noting the use of "60s-ish horns", Jack Rabid from AllMusic described the genre of "This Is the Day", the album's third track, as "la-la-la pop personified". Reighley joked that the Smiths must have "overlooked" the song and its "punchy melody". "Never Do That Again" and "I Get the Message" are the fourth and fifth tracks, respectively, and they both contain "emotional rubble" that adds to the album's "casual sophisticat[ion]". "Baker", written solely by Chase and Schlesinger, features the use of a trumpet played by Chris Botti, drums by Stanley Demeski, and violin by Ralph Farris and Jacqui Carrasco.

Describing single "You Don't Know Anything", Rabid noted that the use of guitars on the production make the song sound "mean". He later would refer to it as a modern version of a My Bloody Valentine song. "Ba Ba Ba" and "Get Out of the City" are the album's eighth and ninth tracks, respectively, and both include drums played by Demeski. "These Are the Things About You" contains "rhythmic activity" and makes use of several guitars in the instrumentation. The album's 11th track, "Quick, Painless and Easy", features Durand singing with deeper vocals that display her French accent. "Back in Our Town" was co-written by the guitarist of the Smashing Pumpkins, James Iha. Described as "gently haunting" by AllMusic's Rabid, it serves as the closer to Apartment Life, except on the Japanese edition where bonus tracks "Sleeping Late" and "Sweet Mary" follow.

== Promotion ==
=== Appearances ===
Prior to the scheduled release date of Apartment Life, Ivy scheduled a promotional radio tour in the United States to take place during September 1997. During a separate tour where Ivy and the Space Monkeys co-headlined, Ivy received notice that they had been dropped from the roster of Atlantic Records' current artists. It was during this time that the group's management team struck a joint deal with Sony Music Entertainment and 550 Music which they went on to accept.

=== Singles ===
The album's lead single, "The Best Thing", was released to modern rock and modern adult contemporary radio stations on September 12, 1997. Physically, it was released as a CD single in the United States and as a promotional 7-inch single in Italy. During this time, Billboard announced that the filming and production of a music video for "The Best Thing" would be completed by the end of the same month. However, an official video was never released for the single, despite another Billboard article describing preparations for filming in November of that same year. "I've Got a Feeling" served as the album's second single overall and was released on CD on October 7, 1997. A music video featuring the band members taking pictures in a futuristic photo booth was released simultaneously and included a cameo appearance from James Iha.

"This Is the Day", the album's third single, was distributed to the public on October 19, 1998, following the band being dropped by Atlantic Records; the release was handled by 550 Music and included distribution to American radio stations and physical shipments of CD singles. It was used in the 1998 American comedy film There's Something About Mary and was included on the film's soundtrack. Reflecting on its usage in the film, Durand commented that it was unimaginable to see their songs in several scenes and that she "fe[lt] so grateful to have something like that in a movie". For further promotion, it was featured on the Pepsi-issued album Pepsi Pop Culture (1998) and the 1999 compilation album Live a Little, Vol. 1. "You Don't Know Anything", the album's fourth and final single, was released on April 29, 1999, in European territories, with previously unreleased bonus tracks "Sleeping Late" and "Sweet Mary", also as a CD single.

== Critical reception ==
Professional ratings
Review scores
Source	Rating
AllMusic	4.5/5 stars
The A.V. Club	Mixed
CMJ New Music Monthly	Favorable
Rolling Stone	3.5/5 stars
Trouser Press	Favorable

Reception towards Apartment Life was highly positive; AllMusic's Rabid awarded the album 4.5 out of 5 stars and called it an "exquisite work". He declared that Apartment Life is a "winsome, pleasant, accomplished, convivial pop LP" that showcases Durand's talent as the lead singer. Labeling "The Best Thing", "This Is the Day", and "You Don't Know Anything" as the album's true highlights, he claimed that "it's a wonder that Ivy isn't massive". Vickie Gilmer and Ira Robbins, writers for Trouser Press, found Apartment Life to have more "confidence and skill" than Realistic and claimed that as a whole, the album is "just about perfect in its chosen realm". CMJ New Music Monthly's Reighley felt that the album displayed Ivy's strengths as a band, such as Durand's vocals and the songwriting. He concluded: "Maintaining these central points of focus permits the additional color and activity of Apartment Life to fill out Ivy's dynamic to splendid and harmonious effect". Robbins, a columnist for Rolling Stone, wrote a separate album review where he highlighted Durand's distinctive French accent and described it as perfect for "breezy pop music". Calling the songs "smartly modeled" and "top-shelf" in quality, she claimed that "Ivy put[s] the fizz in cocktail culture". Stephen Thompson from The A.V. Club claimed that the entirety of Apartment Life fails to match the quality and strength of its opening track, "The Best Thing". However, he also stated that the entire album "never slips too far" behind due to the end product including "impeccably tasteful performances".

In a column where several music critics commended their personal favorite albums, Craig Rosen from Billboard listed Apartment Life as the seventh best album released in 1997, tied with Green Day's Nimrod. On CMJ New Music Monthly, a print magazine that ranks the most popular albums and songs as played by college radio programmers, the album was constantly ranked on their various radio airplay charts, including "Top Alternative Radio Airplay" and "Core Radio".

== Track listing ==
All songs written by Ivy, except "You Don't Know Anything" which features additional lyrics by Chris Collingwood, and "Back in Our Town" with additional lyrics by James Iha.

Apartment Life track listing – Standard edition
No.	Title	Producer(s)	Length
1.	"The Best Thing"	Andy Chase; Adam Schlesinger	3:43
2.	"I've Got a Feeling"	Chase; Schlesinger	3:04
3.	"This Is the Day"	Chase; Schlesinger	3:33
4.	"Never Do That Again"	Chase; Schlesinger; Nashel	3:36
5.	"I Get the Message"	Chase; Schlesinger	3:14
6.	"Baker"	Chase; Schlesinger	4:03
7.	"You Don't Know Anything"	Chase; Schlesinger; Nashel	3:44
8.	"Ba Ba Ba"	Chase; Schlesinger	3:22
9.	"Get Out of the City"	Chase; Schlesinger	3:09
10.	"These Are the Things About You"	Chase; Schlesinger	3:02
11.	"Quick, Painless and Easy"	Chase; Schlesinger; Nashel	4:13
12.	"Back in Our Town"	Chase; Schlesinger; Nashel	4:44
Total length:			44:30

Apartment Life track listing – Japan edition
No.	Title	Producer(s)	Length
13.	"Sleeping Late"	Chase; Schlesinger	2:30
14.	"Sweet Mary"	Chase; Schlesinger	3:14
Total length:			50:14

== Credits and personnel ==
Management

- Recorded at The Place, New York City; Duotone Studios, New York City; and Compositions, New York City

Personnel

- Chris Botti – trumpet
- Jacqui Carrasco – violin
- Andy Chase – engineering, executive producer, mixing
- Lloyd Cole – additional production
- Michael Davis – trombone
- Stanley Demeski – drums
- Dominique Durand – lead and background vocals
- Matthew Ellard – assistant mixing
- Ralph Farris – violin
- Philippe Garcia – photography
- Josh Grier – legal
- James Iha – background vocals, additional production
- Paul Q. Kolderie – mixing
- Bob Ludwig – mastering
- Peter Nashel – production, co-executive producer
- Jody Porter – guitar
- Q Prime – management
- Brenda Rotheiser – art direction, design
- Alan P. Rubin – trumpet
- Adam Schlesinger – engineering, executive producer, mixing
- Sean Slade – mixing
- Dean Wareham – guitar
- Steve Yegelwel – A&R coordination

Credits and personnel adapted from the liner notes of Apartment Life.
