= Peter Wilson (music producer) =

British record producer

- Origin: United Kingdom
- Occupation: Record producer
- Label: Polydor

Peter Wilson is a British record producer. Amongst several others, Wilson worked with the Style Council, Sham 69 and the Comsat Angels.

== Career ==
Wilson is a graduate of Surrey University where he studied on the Tonmeister music course. While on the Tonmeister course he enjoyed a placement with AIR Studios. In that time he worked with, among others, producers George Martin, Tony Visconti and Chris Thomas, engineers Geoff Emerick and Bill Price and musician Dave Gilmour (Pink Floyd). After leaving Surrey University, he worked as an engineer at Polydor Studios, working with artists including Brian Eno, Neil Sedaka, Bill Bruford, Alexis Korner and Peggy Lee. After five years with Polydor, Wilson went freelance.

== Polydor years ==
The first work that established his career was his production of "Angels with Dirty Faces" by Sham 69. He went on to produce singles including "Hurry Up Harry" and "If the Kids Are United" and four albums by Sham 69, and it was during this period that he also produced for the Passions ("I'm in Love with a German Film Star") and four albums with the Comsat Angels, including their single "Independence Day".

It was at Polydor that Wilson first worked with Paul Weller (then still with the Jam) on some demos which in turn led to Wilson producing the last Jam studio album, The Gift, and several singles including "Town Called Malice". He continued to work with Paul Weller with the Style Council, co-producing three studio albums and hits such as "Speak Like a Child", "Long Hot Summer", and "My Ever Changing Moods".

Other records he produced include the Blow Monkeys' single "Digging Your Scene" and albums Limping for a Generation and Animal Magic.

== Partial discography ==
=== Albums ===
- The Style Council - Introducing The Style Council
- The Style Council - Café Bleu
- The Style Council - Our Favourite Shop
- Sham 69 - Tell Us the Truth
- Sham 69 - That's Life
- Sham 69 - The Adventures of the Hersham Boys
- Sham 69 - The Game
- Fiction Factory - Throw the Warped Wheel Out
- Patrik Fitzgerald - Grubby Stories
- The Comsat Angels - Waiting for a Miracle
- The Comsat Angels - Sleep No More
- The Comsat Angels - Fiction
- The Jam - The Gift
- The Jam - Dig the New Breed
- The Cockney Rejects - Greatest Hits Vol. 1
- The Blow Monkeys - Limping for a Generation
- The Blow Monkeys - Animal Magic

=== Singles ===
- The Blow Monkeys - "Digging Your Scene
- The Passions - "I'm in Love with a German Film Star"
- Fiction Factory - "(Feels Like) Heaven"
- Fiction Factory - "Ghost of Love"
- The Jam - "Funeral Pyre"
- The Jam - "Absolute Beginners"
- The Jam - "Town Called Malice"/"Precious"
- The Jam - "Just Who Is the 5 O'Clock Hero?"
- The Jam - "The Bitterest Pill (I Ever Had to Swallow)"
- The Jam - "Beat Surrender"
- The Style Council - "Speak Like a Child"
- The Style Council - "Long Hot Summer"
- The Style Council - "My Ever Changing Moods"
