= Animal Magic (The Blow Monkeys album) =

Studio album by The Blow Monkeys
- Released: 7 April 1986
- Recorded: 1985–1986
- Genre: Sophisti-pop
- Length: 44:03; 48:15 (cassette version)
- Label: RCA/Ariola
- Producers: Peter Wilson; Dr. Robert; Adam Moseley

The Blow Monkeys chronology
Limping for a Generation (1984)	Animal Magic (1986)	She Was Only a Grocer's Daughter (1987)

Professional ratings
Review scores
Source	Rating
Allmusic	2.5/5 stars
The Montreal Gazette	favourable
Schenectady Gazette	favourable

Animal Magic is the second album from the British band The Blow Monkeys, released in 1986 by RCA/Ariola (now BMG). It gave the group their commercial breakthrough after their debut album, Limping for a Generation, had won critical acclaim but had only sold modestly.

Sales of Animal Magic were boosted by the hit single "Digging Your Scene", which charted in the UK (peaking at No. 12), the rest of Europe and the US. The album's first single, the ballad "Forbidden Fruit", had been released almost a year before the LP. After "Digging Your Scene", two more singles were taken from the album, both of which, though catchy and cleverly built, didn't replicate the same level of commercial success: "Wicked Ways" reached No.60 in Great Britain, and "Don't Be Scared of Me" charted at No.77 in UK.

Animal Magic displayed an intelligent collection of slick, soul-influenced, mid-tempo tunes. A couple of ballads offered some diversity: one of them, "I Backed a Winner (in You)", is a heartfelt track, mostly a cappella, with lead singer Dr. Robert, softly playing acoustic guitar while giving the lyrics its perceptive rhythm, where his vocals, and especially those of an aptly named ensemble, The Demon Barbers, acting as a sort of doo wop choir. Amongst the album's many gems is also a duet with Jamaican toaster Eek-A-Mouse on the duet "Sweet Murder".

In 2012, Cherry Red announced the release of a 2-CD deluxe edition with a whole bonus disc of previously unissued demos and B-sides.

== Track listing ==
Words and music by Dr. Robert.

1. "Digging Your Scene" – 4:13
2. "Animal Magic" – 3:07
3. "Wicked Ways" – 4:14
4. "Sweet Murder" – 6:31
5. "Aeroplane City Lovesong" – 4:52
6. "Walking the Blue Beat" – 4:12 (on cassette edition only)
7. "I Nearly Died Laughing" – 3:37
8. "Don't Be Scared of Me" – 3:29
9. "Burn the Rich" – 4:17
10. "I Backed a Winner (in You)" – 2:39
11. "Forbidden Fruit" – 3:59
12. "Heaven Is a Place I'm Moving To" – 3:05

== Singles from the album ==
- "Forbidden Fruit" (1985)
- "Digging Your Scene" (1986) [UK Singles Chart: Number 12; USA Billboard Hot 100: Number 14; USA Hot Dance Club Play: Number 7; Germany: Number 25]

* Used in the 1999 movie Splendor.
* Cover versions have been released by Ivy on Long Distance (2001) and Guestroom (2002), and by Rahsaan Patterson on the Japanese edition of Love in Stereo (1999).

- "Wicked Ways" (1986) [UK Singles Chart: Number 60]
- "Don't Be Scared of Me" (1986) [UK Singles Chart: Number 77]

== Personnel ==
=== The Blow Monkeys ===
- Dr. Robert - words & music; vocals; electric guitar tracks 1–9; acoustic guitar tracks 2, 4–10, 12
- Neville Henry - tenor saxophone tracks 1–8, 11; alto saxophone tracks 2, 5, 8
- Mick Anker - bass tracks 1–8, 11; double bass track 9, 12
- Tony Kiley - drums tracks 1–9, 11

=== Musicians ===
- Dixie Peach, Morris Michael - backing vocals on track 1
- Sylvia Mason-James - backing vocals on tracks 2–8, 11–12
- Mary Cassidy - backing vocals on tracks 2, 4–5, 7–8, 11–12
- Bernita Turner - backing vocals on tracks 2, 8, 12
- Yogi - backing vocals on track 3
- Morris Michael - backing vocals on track 3, 6
- Vicki St. James - backing vocals on tracks 4–5, 7, 11
- Luís Jardim - percussion on tracks 1, 4–5
- Peter Wilson - keyboards on tracks 1, 8; honk box, brass arrangement on track 4; string machine on track 6; Hammond organ on track 7; barroom piano and backing vocals on track 9
- Eek-A-Mouse - vocals on track 4
- Guy Barker - trumpet on track 5, 7, 11
- Joe Brown - slide guitar on track 9
- The Demon Barbers (Anthony Scales, Jeremy Birchall, Rob Scales) - backing vocals on track 10
- Mickey Finn - bongos on track 11
- Dick Morrissey - soprano saxophone on track 12

=== Production ===
- Peter Wilson - production except tracks 3 and 6; string arrangement except track 12
- Dr. Robert, Adam Moseley - production on tracks 3 and 6
- Michael Baker - mixing on track 3; additional recording and mixing on track 1
- John Mealing - string arrangement on track 12
- Axel Kröll - drum programming

=== Staff ===
- Mainartery - art direction & design
- Ian Thomas - photography

== Release details ==
Country	Date	Label	Format	Catalog
UK	1986	RCA/Ariola	CD	PD 70910

== Charts ==
Chart (1986)	Peak position
UK Albums Chart	21
Australian (Kent Music Report)	54
US Billboard 200	35

Song	Chart	Peak	Date
"Animal Magic"	US Billboard 200	35	9 August 1986
"Digging Your Scene"	UK Singles Chart	12	1 March 1986
"Digging Your Scene"	US Billboard Hot 100	14	2 August 1986
"Wicked Ways"	UK Singles Chart	60	17 May 1986
