= She Was Only a Grocer's Daughter =

Studio album by the Blow Monkeys
- Released: April 13, 1987
- Length: 50:48 (LP); 64:13 (CD)
- Labels: RCA/Ariola (1987); BMG/Camden (2002)
- Producers: Michael Baker, with help from the Axeman

The Blow Monkeys chronology
Animal Magic (1986)	She Was Only a Grocer's Daughter (1987)	Whoops! There Goes the Neighbourhood (1988)

Professional ratings
Review scores
Source	Rating
AllMusic	link
Record Mirror	4/5 stars

She Was Only a Grocer's Daughter is the third album by British pop band the Blow Monkeys, originally released in 1987.

The album's title is a reference to Prime Minister of the United Kingdom, Margaret Thatcher, whose Conservative government was unpopular with left wing, pro-Labour Party music acts of the 1980s (including the Blow Monkeys), some of whom joined the Red Wedge movement as part of their political activism.

Some songs on the album reflect dissatisfaction with the political situation in the UK at the time. After a gradual shift towards a slicker, pop-oriented style, the Blow Monkeys also introduced a dance beat, which became a defining feature of the band's later releases.

== History ==
The band's record label RCA invested heavily in the promotion of She Was Only a Grocer's Daughter by issuing it in several different editions (e.g. the vinyl LP included 10 songs and a thick photo book, while the CD was released in two versions, with bonus tracks and alternative track listings, as well as slightly modified song titles).

She Was Only a Grocer's Daughter peaked at No. 20 in the UK Albums Chart in April 1987 (only their 1989 greatest hits compilation, Choices – The Singles Collection, fared better, reaching No. 5). It was the band's only album to spawn four UK top 75 singles. The opening track, "It Doesn't Have to Be This Way", proved to be their most successful single, reaching No. 5 in the UK Singles Chart.

The album's three other singles were: the suggestive ballad "Out with Her" (No. 30); "(Celebrate) The Day After You" (No. 52); "Some Kind of Wonderful" (No. 67). "(Celebrate) The Day After You" is a duet with Curtis Mayfield, which was remixed for the single version. The song was banned by the BBC as it was released during a general election and, as such, was deemed to be too political.

== Track listing ==
Words and music by Dr. Robert.

1. "It Doesn't Have to Be This Way" – 4:00
2. "Some Kind of Wonderful" – 3:33
3. "Out with Her" – 4:40
4. "How Long Can a Bad Thing Last?" – 4:07
5. "Man at the End of His Tether" – 4:00
6. "Rise Above" – 4:53
7. "The Day After You (Celebrate)" – 5:00
8. "Checking Out" – 4:58
9. "Don't Give It Up" – 5:46
10. "Cash" – 6:01
11. "Beautiful Child" – 3:50
12. "This Is the Way It Has to Be" (CD only) – 6:05
13. "The Grantham Grizzler" (CD only) – 7:20

=== BMG / Camden 2002 re-release ===
1. "It Doesn't Have to Be This Way"
2. "Some Kind of Wonderful"
3. "Out with Her"
4. "How Long Can a Bad Thing Last?"
5. "Man at the End of His Tether"
6. "Rise Above"
7. "(Celebrate) The Day After You"
8. "Checking Out"
9. "Don't Give It Up"
10. "Cash"
11. "Beautiful Child"
12. "It Doesn't Have to Be This Way" [Long]
13. "(Celebrate) The Day After You" [Unity Mix]
14. "Smile on Her Face" (Sweet Murder)
15. "Grantham Grizzler"

== Personnel ==
Adapted from the album's liner notes.

=== Musicians ===
The Blow Monkeys

- Dr. Robert – vocals, guitar, string arrangements
- Neville Henry – saxophone
- Tony Kiley – Drums
- Mick Anker – bass guitar

Other musicians

- Michael Baker – keyboards, string arrangements
- The Borneo Horn Section – horns
- Tim Bryant – backing vocals
- Craig Derry – backing vocals
- Will Downing – backing vocals
- Grayson Hughes – backing vocals
- Jimmy Jackson – backing vocals
- Axel Kroel – keyboards, string arrangements
- Sylvia Mason-James – backing vocals
- John Mealing – string arrangements
- Cindy Mizelle – backing vocals
- Gary Rottger – keyboards
- Phil Roy – backing vocals
- Ira Siegel – guitar
- Roger Stuart – backing vocals
- Steve Sydelnick – additional percussion
- Benita Turner – backing vocals
- Marius de Vries – keyboards
- Audrey Wheeler – backing vocals
- Peter Wilson – string arrangements
- Gavyn Wright – strings
- Helen Wright – strings
- Paula Yates – backing vocals

=== Technical ===
- Produced by Michael Baker, with help from the Axeman
- Recording engineer: Douglas Gramma
- Mixed by Brian "Chuck" New, Bob Kraushaar, Douglas Gramma, Rafe McKenna
- Recorded at D&D Studios (New York), The Point Studios, Trident Studios, Swanyard Studios, Westside Studios (London)
- Programmed at Synthnett Studios (New York), The Point Studios (London)
- Mixed at Battery Studios, Sarm West, Red Bus Studios
- Nick Knight: photography
- Sleeve design: Mainartery, London

== Singles from the album ==
- "It Doesn't Have to Be This Way" (1987) (UK Singles Chart: Number 5)
- "Out with Her" (1987) (UK Singles Chart: Number 30)
- "(Celebrate) The Day After You" (1987) (UK Singles Chart: Number 52)
- "Some Kind of Wonderful" (1987) (UK Singles Chart: Number 67)

== Charts ==
Chart performance for She Was Only a Grocer's Daughter
Chart (1987)	Peak position
Canada Top Albums/CDs (RPM)	65
Dutch Albums (Album Top 100)	65
German Albums (Offizielle Top 100)	30
New Zealand Albums (RMNZ)	15
Swedish Albums (Sverigetopplistan)	29
UK Albums (Official Charts)	20
US Billboard 200	134

== Release details ==
Country	Date	Label	Format	Catalogue
UK	1987	RCA/Ariola	CD	PD 71245
UK	1987	RCA/Ariola	LP	PL 71245
UK	1987	RCA/Ariola	MC	PK 71245

RCA /Ariola

Cassette 1987
