= The Blow Monkeys =

British new wave/sophisti-pop band

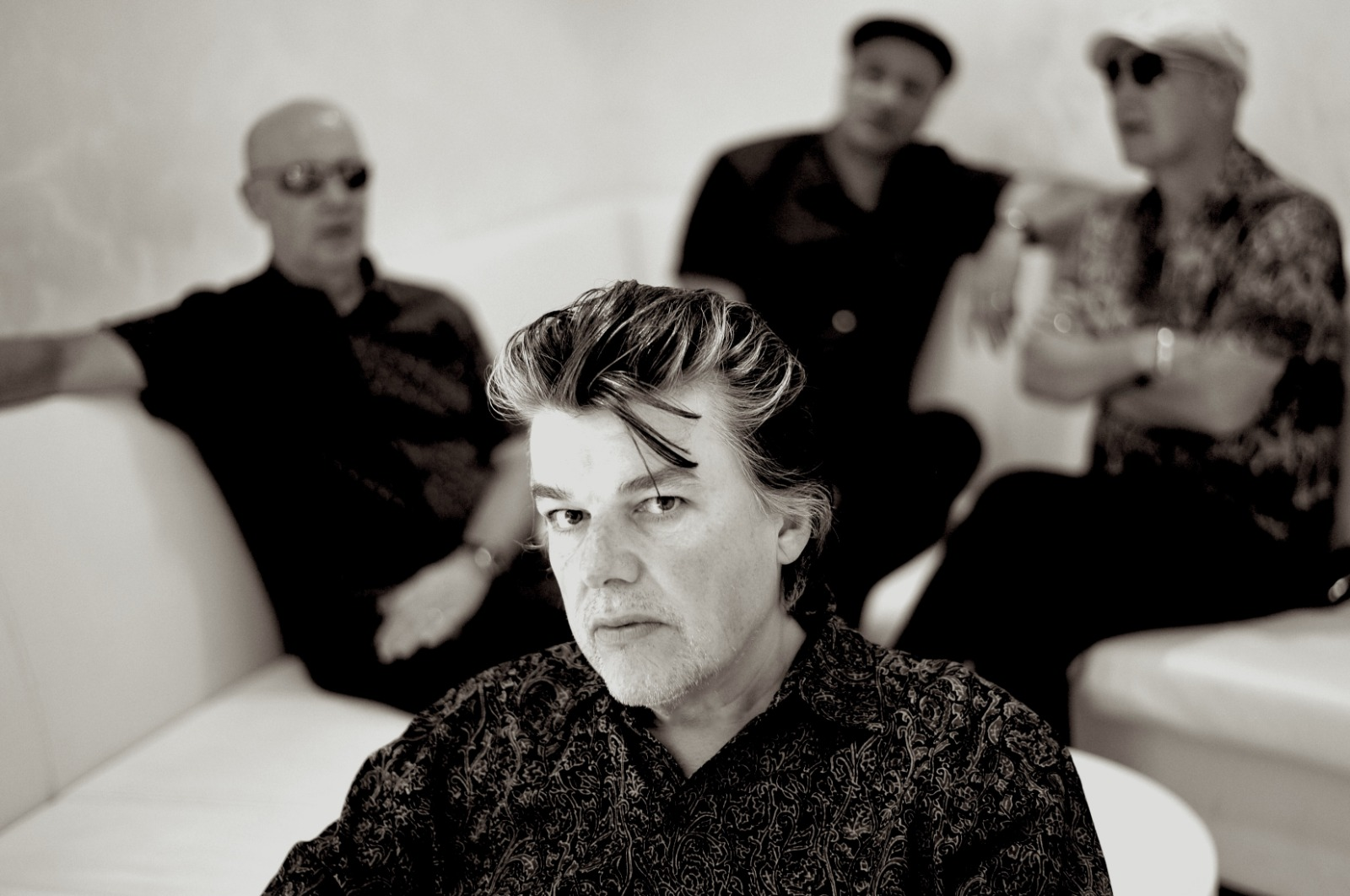
- 2020 press photo

Background information
- Origin: London, England
- Genres: Pop; pop-soul; new wave; sophisti-pop
- Years active: 1981–1990, 2007–present
- Labels: FOD; RCA; Ariola; Cherry Red
- Members: Dr. Robert (Robert Howard); Neville Henry; Mick Anker; Tony Kiley; Crispin Taylor
- Website: Official website

The Blow Monkeys are a British pop band formed in 1981. Their first single, "Live Today Love Tomorrow", was released in 1982. They subsequently enjoyed a successful career with several hit singles and albums throughout the 1980s before splitting up at the beginning of the 1990s. Their first hit song was "Digging Your Scene" which hit No. 12 on the UK Singles Chart and No. 14 on the US Billboard Hot 100 chart in August 1986. They had four albums and eleven singles in the UK charts between 1986 and 1990.

In late 2007 the original band members reunited and have now released a total of thirteen albums.

== Career ==
=== Formation ===
The Blow Monkeys formed in London in 1981 when lead singer, songwriter, guitarist, bassist, and piano player Dr. Robert (born Bruce Robert Howard, 2 May 1961, Haddington, Scotland) returned to the United Kingdom after having spent five years in Australia. Dr. Robert is thought to be named after the Beatles song "Doctor Robert". The other band members are Mick Anker on bass guitar, Neville Henry on saxophone and Tony Kiley (born 16 February 1962) or Crispin Taylor on drums.

=== Recording ===
In 1984, the group released their debut album Limping for a Generation, but their first hit single came in 1986 with "Digging Your Scene", from their second album Animal Magic (which reached number 21 in the UK Albums Chart). The single attracted attention for its topical lyrics, dealing with the AIDS-fueled backlash against gay people. It peaked at No. 14 on the Billboard Hot 100 chart, and number 7 on the Hot Dance Club Play chart. In addition, it reached No. 12 in the UK Singles Chart, No. 24 in Italy, and No. 25 in Germany.

Their third album She Was Only a Grocer's Daughter (whose title is a reference to then-prime minister Margaret Thatcher), was released in January 1987. It reached No. 20 in the UK, thanks to its biggest hit, "It Doesn't Have to Be This Way," which reached No. 5 in the UK and No. 28 in Italy, and is featured in the movie Police Academy 4: Citizens on Patrol. The record featured harmony vocals by singer-songwriter Grayson Hugh. It was released in the United States but failed to chart there. The album also featured a duet with soul legend Curtis Mayfield on "Celebrate (the Day After You)".

The song "You Don't Own Me" appears on the Dirty Dancing soundtrack.

Outside the group, Robert Howard released a single, "Wait", which featured early Chicago house singer Kym Mazelle on female lead vocals. It reached No. 7 on the UK chart and was included on The Blow Monkeys' fourth album, Whoops! There Goes the Neighbourhood), and on their first greatest hits album Choices – The Singles Collection. This was their highest-charting record, reaching No. 5 in the UK Albums Chart in 1989.

=== Split and reunion ===
The band split up in late 1990, shortly after the release of their fifth album Springtime for the World (an EP of the same name was also released, collecting all three singles from the album). After briefly recording with Dee C. Lee as Slam Slam, Dr. Robert went solo. He contributed to Paul Weller's solo debut album, and co-wrote material with both Weller and Lee. Another notable collaborator was Beth Orton.

On 18 November 2007, the original band members announced the reunion of The Blow Monkeys, as well as a new album Devil's Tavern, and a tour in 2008. Released on 8 September 2008, the album was funded by pre-orders placed by fans. Q magazine reviewed the album, saying, "Their first album in 18 years still finds the frontman in fine voice; Robert continues to sound like he dresses only in velvet and smokes cigarillos."

In June 2009, the band released a special-edition double digipack CD and DVD of their performance at the 100 Club in London. It featured the original line-up performing fifteen songs including "Digging Your Scene," "It Doesn't Have to Be This Way," and "Wait," plus other tracks from the band's earlier work, and a few new songs from Devil's Tavern.

January 2011 saw the release of the album Staring at the Sea, with "Steppin' Down" as the first single.

Feels Like a New Morning was released in April 2013 on Cherry Red Records, accompanied by a bonus CD containing 10 Blow Monkeys songs performed by Dr. Robert.

In 2013, Sony Music issued a comprehensive, three-disc box set, Halfway to Heaven: The Best of The Blow Monkeys & Dr Robert, including a 1984 concert from the Hammersmith Palais.

In October 2014, the band went to Monnow Valley Studios, Rockfield, Monmouthshire, Wales to record a new album, with mixing and engineering by Jon Withnall. The resulting album If Not Now, When? was released in April 2015.

In October 2017, the band released their tenth studio album The Wild River on Monks Rd. Records. It was written and produced by Robert Howard and recorded and mixed at Gismo 7 Studio in Motril, Spain. The album features Crispin Taylor on drums and is a return to their soul/funk roots.

In October 2018, the band supported Level 42 on their Eternity Tour.

In September 2021, they released their 11th studio album Journey To You, produced and written by Dr. Robert.

In January 2024, they announced their 12th studio album Together/Alone on Scottish label "Last Night From Glasgow" , to be released in that May.

== Discography ==
- Limping for a Generation (1984)
- Animal Magic (1986)
- She Was Only a Grocer's Daughter (1987)
- Whoops! There Goes the Neighbourhood (1989)
- Springtime for the World (1990)
- Devil's Tavern (2008)
- Staring at the Sea (2011)
- Feels Like a New Morning (2013)
- If Not Now, When? (2015)
- The Wild River (2017)
- Journey to You (2021)
- Together/Alone (2024)
- Birdsong. (2025)
