= What Makes It Go? =

What Makes it Go?

Studio album by Komeda
- Released: 1998
- Recorded: 1997
- Genres: Pop, rock
- Labels: North of No South, Minty Fresh
- Producers: Komeda; Eskil Lövström

Komeda chronology
The Genius of Komeda (1995)	What Makes it Go? (1998)	Pop På Svenska & Plan 714 till Komeda (2001)

Professional ratings
Review scores
Source	Rating
AllMusic	4/5 stars
Pitchfork Media	7.5/10

What Makes it Go? is the third full-length studio album by Swedish band Komeda. Licensed from Swedish record label North of No South, Minty Fresh gave the album an international release in 1998.

In a 2020 interview for the Jeffrey Podcast, bass player Marcus Holmberg said that the band set out to build on the success of their previous album by writing an album of "pop masterpieces". His own favourite tracks from the album were A Simple Formality and Our Hospitality.

Upon its release What Makes it Go? received positive reviews from music critics and was noted for being a worthy progression from previous album The Genius of Komeda. It is now generally viewed as the band's best album.

The album got significant play on MTV and increased their profile in the US. Beck approached them to support his Odelay tour.

The track "It's Alright, Baby" was featured in the season two episode "Like Mother, Like Daughter" of Gilmore Girls.

== Track listing ==
All songs written by Komeda

1. "Binario"
2. "It's Alright, Baby"
3. "Curious"
4. "Cul de Sac"
5. "Living Things"
6. "Flabbergast"
7. "Campfire"
8. "Happyment"
9. "Our Hospitality"
10. "Focus"
11. "A Simple Formality"
12. "Mushroom" (Japan only bonus track)
