= Kokomemedada =

Studio album by Komeda
- Released: 2003
- Recorded: 2003
- Genres: Pop, rock
- Labels: Sonet Records; Minty Fresh
- Producer: Komeda

Komeda chronology
Pop På Svenska & Plan 714 till Komeda (2001)	Kokomemedada (2003)

Professional ratings
Review scores
Source	Rating
AllMusic	3/5 stars

Kokomemedada is the fourth full-length studio album from Swedish band Komeda, and their third album sung in English. Kokomemedada was first released in 2003 on Sonet Records and in 2004 in the United States on the Minty Fresh label. The album is the first Komeda release after the departure of guitarist Mattias Norlander, leaving the band to continue as a trio.

The album was more experimental in tone, reflecting years of writing music for theatre, and with a darker tone due to the band's recent bereavements. Most of the songs were assembled in the studio and not performed live.

The album contains ten songs (plus a hidden bonus track on the Minty Fresh release). One song, "Blossom (Got to Get it Out)" is a re-recording of Komeda's song "B.L.O.S.S.O.M." from the soundtrack to the animated series The Powerpuff Girls. "Out from the Rain" might be best known as the song playing in the US advertisement for the Nintendo DS game Kirby: Canvas Curse.

The title of the album is the band name written using the swedish children's cant known as rövarspråket.

== Track listing ==
All songs written by Komeda

1. "Nonsense"
2. "Blossom (Got to Get It Out)"
3. "Victory Lane"
4. "Fade in Fade Out"
5. "Catcher"
6. "Elvira Madigan"
7. "Out from the Rain"
8. "Dead"
9. "Reproduce"
10. "Brother"
11. "Check it Out" (Minty Fresh release only)
