= Tahiti 80 =

French indie pop band

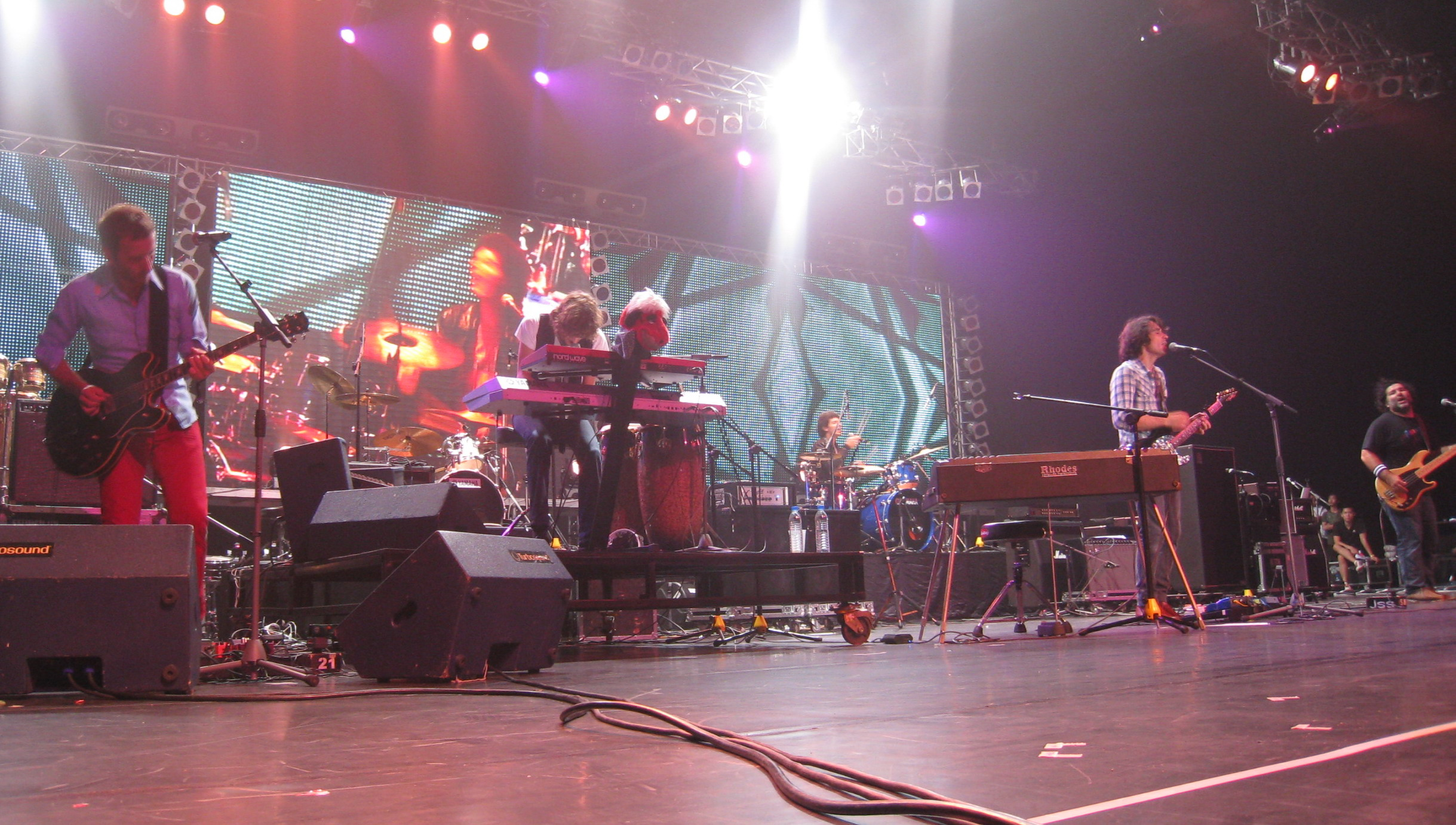
- Tahiti 80 Live in One World Party, Bangkok 2009

Background information
- Origin: Rouen, France
- Genres: French pop, indie pop, downtempo, synthpop, indie rock
- Years active: 1992-present
- Labels: Human Sounds; The Militia Group (US); Atmosphériques (France); Island/Universal (international)
- Members: Xavier Boyer; Médéric Gontier; Sylvain Marchand; Pedro Resende; Raphaël Léger; Hadrien Grange
- Past members: Julien Barbagallo

Tahiti 80 is a French indie pop band from Rouen. The group was founded in 1992 by Xavier Boyer, Pedro Resende, Médéric Gontier and Sylvain Marchand.

== History ==
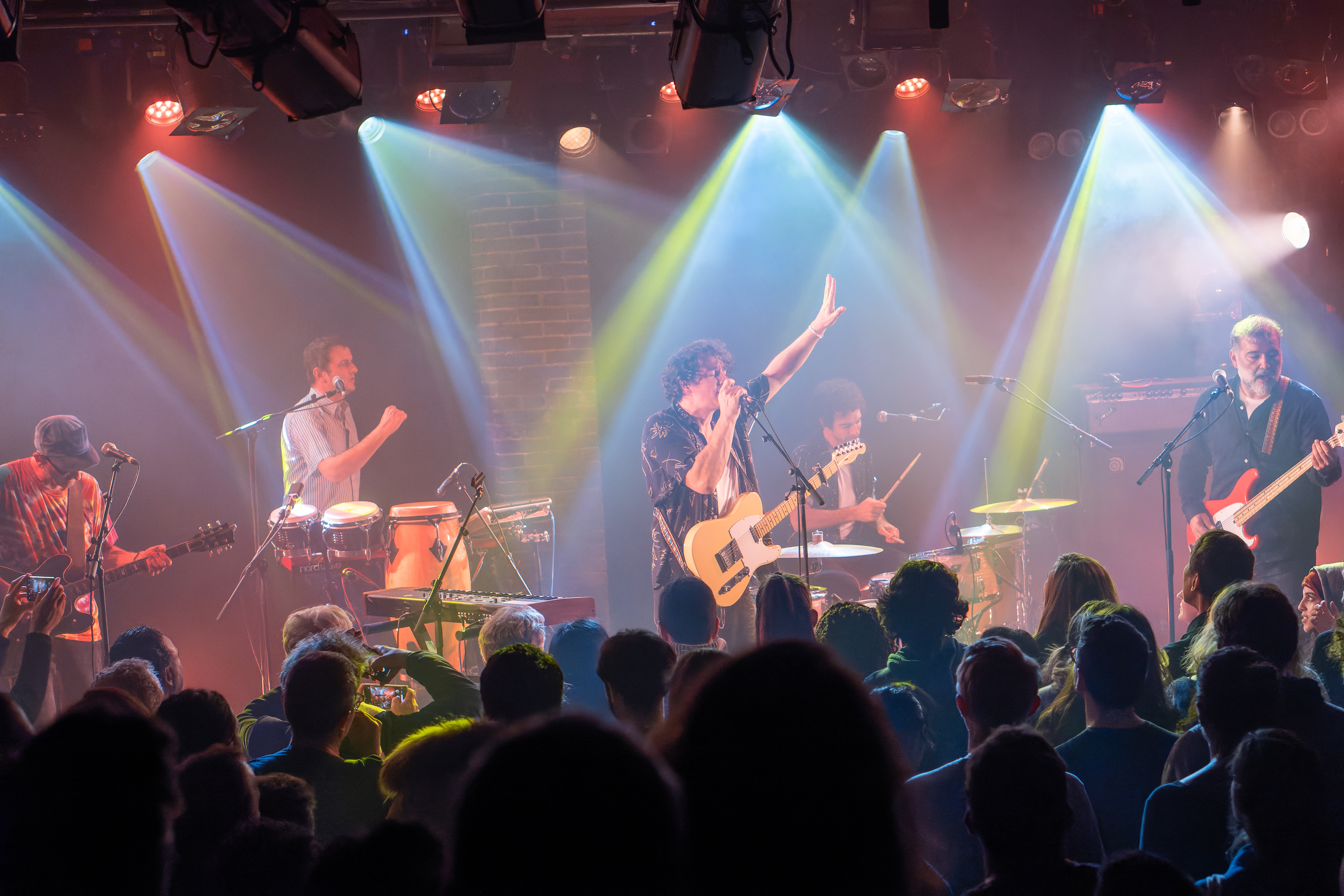
Tahiti 80 with Michelle Blades – La Maroquinerie, Paris – 8 December 2022

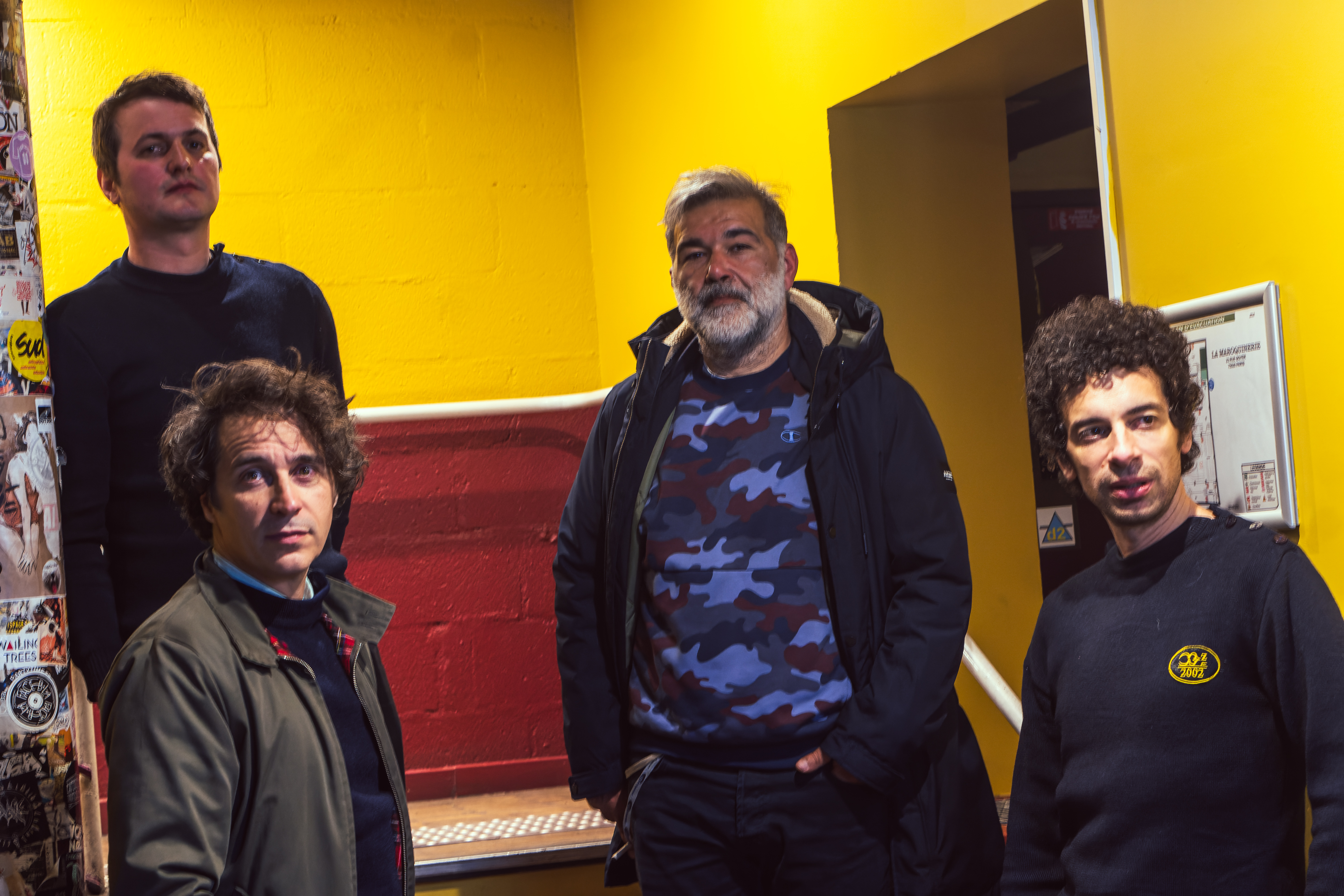
Tahiti 80 with Michelle Blades – La Maroquinerie, Paris – 8 December 2022

Singer and guitarist Boyer and bassist Resende formed the group as students at the University of Rouen, taking their name from a souvenir t-shirt given to Boyer's father in 1980. They recruited guitarist Mederic Gontier, and a year later drummer Sylvain Marchand. The four-piece released a self-produced and self-financed EP, 20 Minutes, which resulted in a deal with French label Atmospheriques.

In 1998, the band flew to New York City to record their first album, Puzzle, with Andy Chase. Featuring contributions from Eric Matthews and Adam Schlesinger, Puzzle was mixed in Sweden by Tore Johansson. Puzzle received a gold certification from the RIAJ in December 2000. Tahiti 80's U.S. label, Minty Fresh, released a mini LP called Extra Pieces, which included B-sides, remixes and other rarities.

In 2001, the band recorded a follow-up album, Wallpaper for the Soul, again with Chase. The sessions took place in Rouen, New York City, Étretat, London, and Portland, Oregon. The album was mixed by Tony Lash and arranged by Richard Anthony Hewson. Wallpaper for the Soul was released in 2002.

For their third album, from 2003 to 2004, Tahiti 80 spent several months at their own recording studio, the Tahitilab. The songs were mostly improvised and written in the studio, and collaborations with Neal Pogue and Serban Ghenea. British singer Linda Lewis also appeared as a guest artist on "Your Love Shines". "Better Days Will Come" was featured in the first episode of the fourth season of Smallville in September 2004.

In 2007, the band transferred to Barclay and in 2008, they returned to the Tahitilab to record Activity Center.

During winter and early spring 2010, Tahiti 80 recorded their fifth album, The Past, The Present & The Possible. The album was released in early 2011. In 2012, Barbagallo left Tahiti 80 to join Tame Impala, with multi-instrumentalist Hadrien Grange replacing him. In 2014, Tahiti 80 released Ballroom, their sixth album, which was co-produced by Richard Swift.

== Line-up ==
- Xavier Boyer: vocals, guitars, bass, keyboards, piano
- Médéric Gontier: guitar, vocals, keyboards
- Sylvain Marchand: drums, percussion, keyboards, piano
- Pedro Resende: bass, programming, keyboards, percussion, vocals
- Raphaël Léger: drums, percussion, Keyboards, vocals
- Hadrien Grange: keyboards, percussion, vocals (2012–present)

=== Past members ===
- Julien Barbagallo: drums, percussion, keyboards, vocals (2008–2012)

== Discography ==
=== Albums ===
- 1999 Puzzle
- 2002 Wallpaper for the Soul
- 2005 Fosbury
- 2008 Activity Center
- 2011 The Past, the Present & the Possible
- 2014 Ballroom
- 2018 The Sunshine Beat Vol. 1
- 2022 Here With You
- 2024 Hello Hello

=== EPs ===
- 1996 20 Minutes
- 2000 Heartbeat Remix
- 2001 Extra Pieces
- 2001 I.S.A.A.C
- 2001 Songs From Outer Space
- 2003 A Piece of Sunshine
- 2004 Extra Pieces of Sunshine
- 2005 Sotomayor EP
- 2008 Joulupukki
- 2010 Solitary Bizness
- 2013 Bang
- 2016 ... And the Rest Is Just Crocodile Tears

=== Singles ===
- 1999 "Heartbeat"
- 2000 "Made First"
- 2000 "A Love From Outer Space"
- 2000 "Yellow Butterfly"
- 2002 "1000 Times"
- 2002 "Soul Deep"
- 2005 "Big Day" (featured on the FIFA 07 video game soundtrack)
- 2005 "Changes"
- 2005 "Here Comes"
- 2006 "Chinatown" (split single with Fugu)
- 2008 "All Around"
- 2009 "Unpredictable"
- 2011 "Darling (Adam & Eve)"
- 2011 "Easy"
- 2013 "Bang"
- 2014 "Crush!"
- 2014 "Missing"
- 2018 "Let Me Be Your Story"
- 2018 "Sound Museum"
- 2018 "My Groove"
- 2019 "Hurts"
- 2021 "Hot"
- 2022 "Lost In The Sound"

=== Compilations ===
- 2003 A Piece of Gold
- 2005 Unusual Sounds
- 2010 Singles Club
- 2019 Fear Of An Acoustic Planet

=== Other releases ===
- 2005 Changes (DVD)
