= 1000 times =

1000 times may refer to:

- "1000×", a 2016 song by Jarryd James
- "1000 Times", a song by Gomez from the 2002 album In Our Gun
- "1,000 Times", a song by Tahiti 80 from the 2002 album Wallpaper for the Soul
- 1000X (EP), by Man or Astro-man?, 1997

== See also ==
- 1000 (disambiguation)
