= Plan 714 till Komeda =

EP by Komeda
- Released: 1995
- Genres: Pop, rock
- Label: North of No South
- Producers: Komeda; Pelle Henricsson

Komeda chronology
Pop På Svenska (1993)	Plan 714 till Komeda (1995)	The Genius of Komeda (1996)

Professional ratings
Review scores
Source	Rating
Allmusic	link

Plan 714 till Komeda is an EP by Swedish band Komeda. It was originally released in 1995 in Sweden on the North of No South label. As was their debut album two years prior, the songs are sung in the band's native language.

This was the first release following the departure of guitarist Henrik Andersson and the arrival of his replacement Mattias Norlander. The band were keen to see what they could do following Andersson's departure and, impatient to keep moving, they decided to release these four tracks as an EP and not wait for a full album's worth of material.

Its title is a reference to the Hergé comic-strip album Vol 714 pour Sydney (Flight 714 to Sydney), the Swedish title of which is Plan 714 till Sydney.

In 2001 this EP was combined with the Pop På Svenska album and issued by Minty Fresh to international markets.

== Track listing ==
All songs written by Komeda

1. "Fuego de la Vida"
2. "Herbamore"
3. "Som I Fjol"
4. "En Spricka I Taket"
