= Wallpaper for the Soul =

Studio album by Tahiti 80
- Released: October 8, 2002
- Recorded: May 2001 – January 2002
- Studio: Stratosphere Sound, New York City; Le Vert Luisant, Etretat; Tahiti Lab, Rouen
- Genre: French pop, indie pop
- Length: 46:52
- Label: Minty Fresh
- Producer: Tahiti 80, Andy Chase

Tahiti 80 chronology
Puzzle (1999)	Wallpaper for the Soul (2002)	Fosbury (2005)

Singles from Wallpaper for the Soul
- 1. "Soul Deep" Released: 2002; 2. "1,000 Times" Released: 2002

Professional ratings
Aggregate scores
Source	Rating
Metacritic	71/100
Review scores
Source	Rating
AllMusic	4/5 stars
The Guardian	4/5 stars

Wallpaper for the Soul is the second studio album by French indie pop band Tahiti 80, released on Minty Fresh in 2002. It peaked at number 86 on the CMJ Radio 200 chart. As of 2003, it has sold 130,000 copies worldwide.

== Critical reception ==
At Metacritic, which assigns a weighted average score out of 100 to reviews from mainstream critics, the album received an average score of 71% based on 10 reviews, indicating "generally favorable reviews".

Todd Kristel of AllMusic gave the album 4 stars out of 5, saying: "More fully realized and bolstered with a stronger song selection than its predecessor, Wallpaper for the Soul is a well-crafted collection of infectious tunes that won't necessarily stick with you for years to come, but should be quite enjoyable while you're listening."

== Track listing ==
No.	Title	Length
1.	"Wallpaper for the Soul"	3:50
2.	"1,000 Times"	3:49
3.	"Separate Ways"	3:46
4.	"Get Yourself Together"	3:31
5.	"The Other Side"	4:41
6.	"Happy End"	4:28
7.	"Fun Fair"	4:27
8.	"Soul Deep"	3:23
9.	"Open Book"	3:49
10.	"The Train"	3:02
11.	"Don't Look Below"	3:33
12.	"Memories of the Past"	4:33
Total length:		46:52

Japanese edition bonus tracks
No.	Title	Length
13.	"Silently Walking"	2:59
14.	"Aftermath"	3:04
Total length:		53:06

== Personnel ==
Credits adapted from liner notes.

Musicians

- Xavier – vocals, guitar, bass guitar, saxophone, synthesizer, mellotron, electric piano, organ, bells, drums
- Mederic – guitar, background vocals
- Pedro – synthesizer, bass guitar, programming
- Sylvain – synthesizer, mellotron, drums, conga
- Eric Matthews – piano, trumpet
- Bob Hoffnar – pedal steel guitar
- Andy Chase – human beat box, background vocals
- Urban Soul Orchestra – horns, flute, strings

Technical personnel

- Tahiti 80 – production
- Andy Chase – production, engineering
- Richard Hewson – arrangement
- Tony Lash – mixing
- Scott Hull – mastering
- Elisabeth Arkhipoff – artwork
- Laurent Fetis – artwork
- Stephane Milon – photography

== Charts ==
Chart	Peak position
French Albums (SNEP)	110
