= Bark Bark Disco =

Maltese Musician

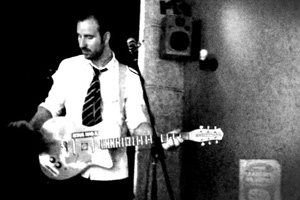

Background information
- Born: 9 March 1977 (age 49)
- Origin: Malta
- Genres: New wave, synth-pop
- Years active: 2011–present
- Labels: Minty Fresh, Italians Do It Better
- Members: Ian Schranz
- Website: BarkBarkDisco.com

Ian Schranz (born 9 March 1977), best known by the stage name Bark Bark Disco, is a Maltese indie musician. Schranz first began his career as the drummer of the band Beangrowers before establishing himself as a solo artist.

Schranz released a demo single under the name Bark Bark Disco called "Song for the Lovers" which was a tribute to 1970s adult actress Brigitte Lahaie, and was taken from Erwin Dietrich's film Six Swedish Girls in a Boarding School. It received half a million views on YouTube in two weeks. Following this, organisers asked him to play a solo show opening for Bonnie Prince Billy in a masonic cemetery in Valletta.

Schranz has collaborated extensively with other artists such as JOON, Andre Herman Dune aka Stanley Brinks, Johnny Jewel and Jeffrey Lewis among others.

== Personal life ==
In an interview for The Times of Malta with Ramona Depares, Schranz describes meeting the two other members of his first band, Beangrowers, when they were fourteen years old.

Ian Schranz has survived bacterial meningitis three times, making him a recurrent meningitis sufferer.

He and his brother David became co-owners of the Hole in the Wall, Sliema, a cafe and live music venue in Sliema, Malta, in 2015. The brothers gentrified what had been a sports bar, and turned it into a hip venue for live music.

== Permanent members ==
- Ian Schranz – vocals, guitar, keys, bass and drums

== Guest members ==
- JOON, Rebecca Theuma, Katryna Storace, Daniel Cassar, Daniel Abdilla, Antonio Tufignio, Mark Zizza, Stanley Brinks, Freschard

== Discography ==
=== Albums & EPs ===
- On the Dance Floor - EP (Italians Do It Better, 2022)
- Holy Smokes (Minty Fresh, 2018)
- Your Mum Says Hello! (2010)

=== Singles ===
- "Your Broke My Heart to Pizza" (2024)
- "On the Dance Floor" (Italians Do It Better, 2022)
- "Borderline" (Italians Do It Better, 2021)
- "Hot Love" (Italians Do It Better, 2021)
- "Get Up and Run" (Italians Do It Better, 2021)
- "'Til the End" (Italians Do It Better, 2020)
- "Another Play" (Italians Do It Better, 2020)
- "Honey I Love You Now" (Minty Fresh, 2018)
- "Big Love" (Minty Fresh, 2018)
- "Song for the Lovers" (Parasol, 2013)
