= Our Little Corner of the World: Music from Gilmore Girls =

Soundtrack album by Various Artists
- Released: October 1, 2002
- Genres: Pop rock; folk-pop
- Length: 60:02
- Label: Rhino

Professional ratings
Review scores
Source	Rating
Allmusic	4.5/5 stars

Our Little Corner of the World: Music from Gilmore Girls is a 2002 soundtrack release from Rhino Records for The WB's Gilmore Girls. The album is a combination of selections from the score composed by Sam Phillips and the music of other musicians heard, mostly, during the first two seasons of the show. Also included on the album is the new version of "Where You Lead" by Carole King and her daughter Louise Goffin, a snippet of which serves as the theme song for the show.

The album was originally scheduled for release on September 24, 2002 to coincide with the premiere of the third season however it was delayed for one week, until October 1, 2002.

In her review of the album, Heather Phares of Allmusic said, "Our Little Corner of the World is almost too good to be true, and one of the best television soundtracks released in recent memory." Noel Holston of the Long Island, New York newspaper Newsday found that for the selection of rock-pop songs, "It's not appreciably better than the new Scrubs CD or the 1999 companion to Felicity" however with the interspersed compositions from Sam Philips, "It knits together like a bright teen's daydream." Mary Jacobi of The Village Voice noted that, "Many tunes recall Rory's early romance with the reliable Dean and the confusion inspired by his bad-boy rival, Jess." Jacobi concluded by noting that, "The Palladinos remember the first kiss, and they know how important it is to get the music right this time."

== Track listing ==
1. "Waltz #1 (Cue)" – Sam Phillips (0:14)
2. "What a Wonderful World" – Joey Ramone (2:21)
  - Season 2, Episode 15, "Lost and Found"; plays when Luke knocks a hole in his apartment wall for Jess to have his own room.
3. "Child Psychology" – Black Box Recorder (4:05)
  - Season 1, Episode 19, "Emily in Wonderland"; the song Lane brings over that Rory likes because it makes her feel gloomy.
4. "Know Your Onion!" – The Shins (2:27)
  - Season 2, Episode 7, "Like Mother, Like Daughter"; the song Rory was listening to at lunch during the start of the episode when the Chilton guidance counselor interrupts her.
5. "I Found Love" – The Free Design (2:40)
  - Season 2, Episode 1, "Sadie, Sadie"; plays as the start as the Gilmore Girls walk around Stars Hollow where everybody has one of Lorelai's thousand daisies.
6. "Car Song" – Elastica (2:25)
  - Season 2, Episode 19, "Teach Me Tonight"; plays right before the Jess and Rory get into the car accident.
7. "Oh My Love" – John Lennon (2:41)
  - Season 1, Episode 16, "Star-Crossed Lovers and Other Strangers"; the song is playing when Dean tells Rory "I love you" and she says nothing.
8. "Getting Married (Cue)" – Sam Phillips (0:29)
9. "Where You Lead I Will Follow" – Carole King & daughter Louise Goffin (3:26)
  - The theme song for the series.
10. "Clear Spot" – the Pernice Brothers (2:20)
  - At the time of the album release, had not yet been played on the show, but the group did have "The Weakest Shade of Blue" in Season 4, Episode 4, "Chicken or Beef?".
11. "One Line" – PJ Harvey (3:10)
  - Season 1, Episode 21, "Love, Daisies, and Troubadours"; from the moment where Rory tells Dean "I love you, you idiot" and kisses him.
12. "I'm the Man Who Murdered Love" – XTC (3:42)
  - Season 1, Episode 2, "The Lorelais' First Day at Chilton"; the song that Lane plays from her new CD for Rory.
13. "Maybe Next Week (Cue)" – Sam Phillips (0:24)
14. "Thirteen" – Big Star (2:35)
  - Season 1, Episode 9, "Rory's Dance", from when she goes walking with Dean through Stars Hollow afterwards.
15. "Human Behaviour" – Björk (4:11)
  - Season 2, Episode 10, "The Bracebridge Dinner"; is heard when the Gilmore girls see the perfect snowman has been destroyed.
16. "I Don't Mind" – Slumber Party (2:44)
  - Season 3, Episode 4, "One's Got Class and the Other One Dyes" which is when Rory dyes Lane's hair.
17. "Tell Her What She Wants to Know" – Sam Phillips (2:13)
  - Season 4, Episode 1, "Ballroom & Biscotti".
18. "It's Alright, Baby" – Komeda (2:50)
  - Season 2, Episode 7, "Like Mother, Like Daughter"; the song Rory listens to on her headphones in the Chilton cafeteria at the end.
19. "God Only Knows" – Claudine Longet (3:29)
  - Season 1, Episode 12, "Double Date"; the song Rory and Lane try to listen to (whilst Lane asks Rory to set her up on a date with Dean’s friend) while Lorelai is trying to study and keeps making them turn it down and then up.
20. "Smile" – Grant-Lee Phillips (3:53)
  - Season 3, Episode 3, "Application Anxiety"; from the end as Luke and Taylor are having a fight and Rory and Lorelai are strolling around Stars Hollow again.
21. "O'Oh" – Yoko Ono (3:42)
  - Season 2, Episode 21, "Lorelai's Graduation Day", when Rory and Jess are checking out New York City.
22. "Rory and Lane (Cue)" – Sam Phillips (0:14)
23. "Girl From Mars" – Ash (3:27)
  - Season 2, Episode 5, "Nick & Nora/Sid & Nancy"; at the end, when Jess and Rory engage in cute book talk.
24. "My Little Corner of the World" – Yo La Tengo (2:23)
  - Season 1, Episode 21, "Love, Daisies, and Troubadours"; from the end, as Lorelai and Rory run to each other to share their good news.
  - a cover version of the song, performed by Kit Pongetti, formerly of Austin-based Those Who Dig, is heard at the end of "Pilot" when Lorelai and Rory are sitting in Luke's Diner.
