= Beangrowers =

Maltese band

- Origin: St. Julian's, Malta
- Genres: Indie, Rock, Alternative Rock
- Years active: 1999–present
- Labels: Minty Fresh, Rough Trade
- Members: Alison Galea, Ian Schranz & Mark Sansone

Beangrowers are a Maltese three-piece indie rock band consisting of Alison Galea (vocals, guitar and keyboard), Mark Sansone (bass guitar) and Ian Schranz (drums and noise). All three were born in 1977 in St. Julian's, Malta. The members of the band are also songwriters, resulting in their albums reflecting diverse influences, including indie rock, punk, and goth.

== History ==
Schranz (known by the stage name Bark Bark Disco) and Sansone were childhood friends and later started playing music together. They were joined by friend Galea. According to the band's website, the name 'Beangrowers' was given by a fan when a promoter demanded a name for posters. Galea provides a distinctive British-accented voice to Beangrowers songs.

The Beangrowers recorded demo tapes in early 1996 when the members were aged 18. Early recordings featured sounds from 1950s science fiction movies and computer-generated noise. Within a year they travelled to play in German clubs. The Beangrowers record mainly in English, but are best known in the German-speaking world. In 1999 their first single made the top 20 of the Deutsche Alternative Charts, an alternative rock sales ranking in Germany. Their single "José Clemente" from their album Beangrowers reached No. 7 on New Zealand charts.

Their single, The Priest, was featured on the soundtrack of Wim Wenders' 2004 movie Land of Plenty featuring Michelle Williams. Galea also sang for the Wim Wenders' soundtrack for the 2011 biopic Pina 2011. They also worked on the soundtrack for the movie 2012 movie Love Me, by Rick Bota.

Schranz, and his brother, bought Hole in the Wall, described as the oldest bar in Sliema, on a dare, in 2015, and made it a venue for live music.

== Musical style ==
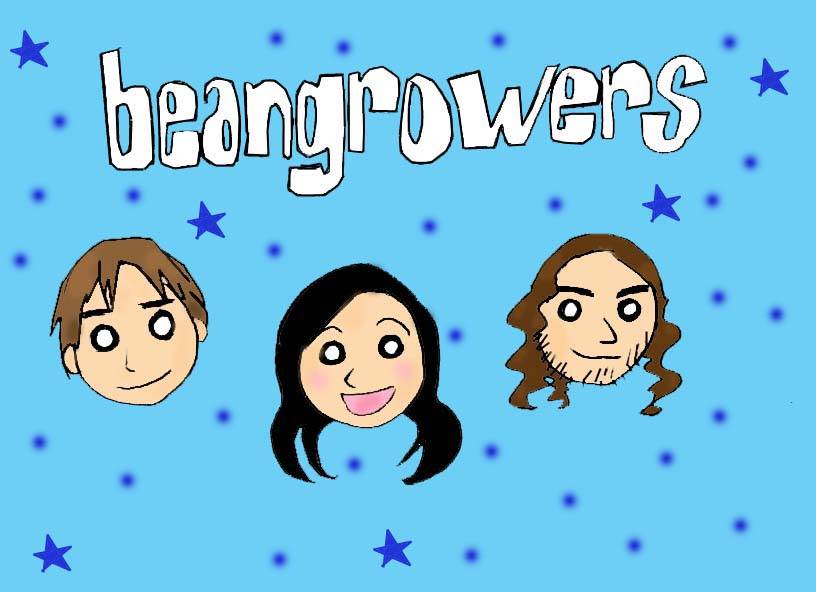
Beangrowers fan art

The group is influenced by alternative groups like the Violent Femmes, Joy Division, and the Pixies. The band notes that "all the greats essentially wrote pop songs, like The Cure, Nirvana, Depeche Mode etc." Many of Beangrowers' songs, such as "Teen Titans" with repeating lyrics "We never listen to the radio" seem to reference the band's own obscure indie status.

== Discography ==
=== Albums ===
- 48K, June 1999 - Review
- Beangrowers, April 2001 - Review
- Dance Dance Baby, October 2004 - Review
- Not In A Million Lovers, April 2008 - Review 1 2

=== Singles ===
- Astroboy, March 1999
- Genzora, July 1999
- Jose Clemente, 1999 (New Zealand only)
- Feel, May 2000
- Teen Titans, April 2001
- This Year's Love, 2002
- You Are You Are, October 2004
- I Like You, January 2006 (UK only)
- Not In A Million Lovers, April 2008
- Love, You Can Never Give Up, December 2018
- Dystopia, July 2019
