= Komeda (band) =

Swedish rock band

- Origin: Umeå, Sweden
- Genres: Rock; Pop; Indie
- Years active: 1991–present
- Labels: North of No South; Minty Fresh; Universal
- Members: Lena Karlsson; Jonas Holmberg; Marcus Holmberg
- Past members: (Lars) Henrik Andersson; Mattias Norlander

Komeda is a Swedish pop/indie band from Umeå. They were initially called Cosma Komeda, named in honour of composer Vladimir Cosma and jazz musician and composer Krzysztof Komeda. The band started in the mid-1980s as a post-punk band influenced by bands such as Can, Devo, and The Velvet Underground, and by film soundtracks. Their first public appearance was in 1991 as a pit band for a Buster Keaton festival in their home town of Umeå. Forming as a quartet of schoolfriends, Komeda consisted of vocalist Lena Karlsson, guitarist (Lars) Henrik Andersson (Ray Wonder) (in 1994 replaced by Mattias Norlander from the band Blithe), bassist Marcus Holmberg and Holmberg's brother Jonas on drums. They increased in popularity, especially in the US, following tours with Beck and Ben Folds Five and regular MTV appearances. Reluctant to move permanently to the US to pursue further success, and grieving from the loss of their parents, the band went into hiatus following 1998's What Makes It Go? although they continued to make music for theatre during this time.

During 2001 the band was reduced to a trio with the departure of Norlander as he left to work as a software engineer in Stockholm. In 2002, Marcus Holmberg joined guitarists Frans Perris and Magnus Kollberg to form the band The Most. In 2010 Jonas Holmberg launched his new project Gilles & Felix, an experimental audio/visual performance. Marcus Holmberg now lives in Stockholm and works on various music projects, including playing bass in the bands Woodlands and Dewed .

Komeda provided the score music for the animated film Pettson och Findus – Kattonauten (2000). They have also recorded under the name Projektor 7, adding music to silent movies.

In 2006, "Check It Out", a hidden track from the Kokomemedada album, was used in commercials for Old Navy. Simultaneously, the song "Out from the Rain" from the same album was used in a commercial for Kirby: Canvas Curse on the Nintendo DS.

== Discography ==
=== Albums/EPs ===
- Pop På Svenska (1993, Sweden only)
- Plan 714 till Komeda (1995, Sweden only)
- The Genius of Komeda (1996)
- What Makes It Go? (1998)
- Pop På Svenska & Plan 714 till Komeda (2001)
- Kokomemedada (2003)

=== Singles ===
- "Rocket Plane (Music on the Moon)" (1996)
- "Boogie Woogie/Rock 'n' Roll" (1996)
- "Travels in Stereo" (1998)
- "It's Alright, Baby" (1998)
- "A Simple Formality" (Dot Remixes) (1998)
- "Check it Out" (1999)

=== Multi-artist compilations ===
- North of No South (1992)
  - Track 01: "Magnifying Glass"
  - Track 16: "Mellow Song"
- North of No South 2 (1997)
  - Track 07: "More is More"
  - Track 12: "Rocket Plane"
- Aaaaaah...nonscd 75 (1998)
  - Track 01: "A Simple Formality"
  - Track 22: "Boogie Woogie/Rock N' Roll"
- Hitta Mitten (1998)
  - Track 04: "Our Connection"
- Atomium 3003 (2000)
  - Track 06: "A Simple Formality"
- The Powerpuff Girls: Heroes and Villains (2000)
  - Track 07: "B.L.O.S.S.O.M."
- Our Little Corner of the World: Music from Gilmore Girls (2002)
  - Track 18: "It's Alright, Baby"
