= Zeshan B =

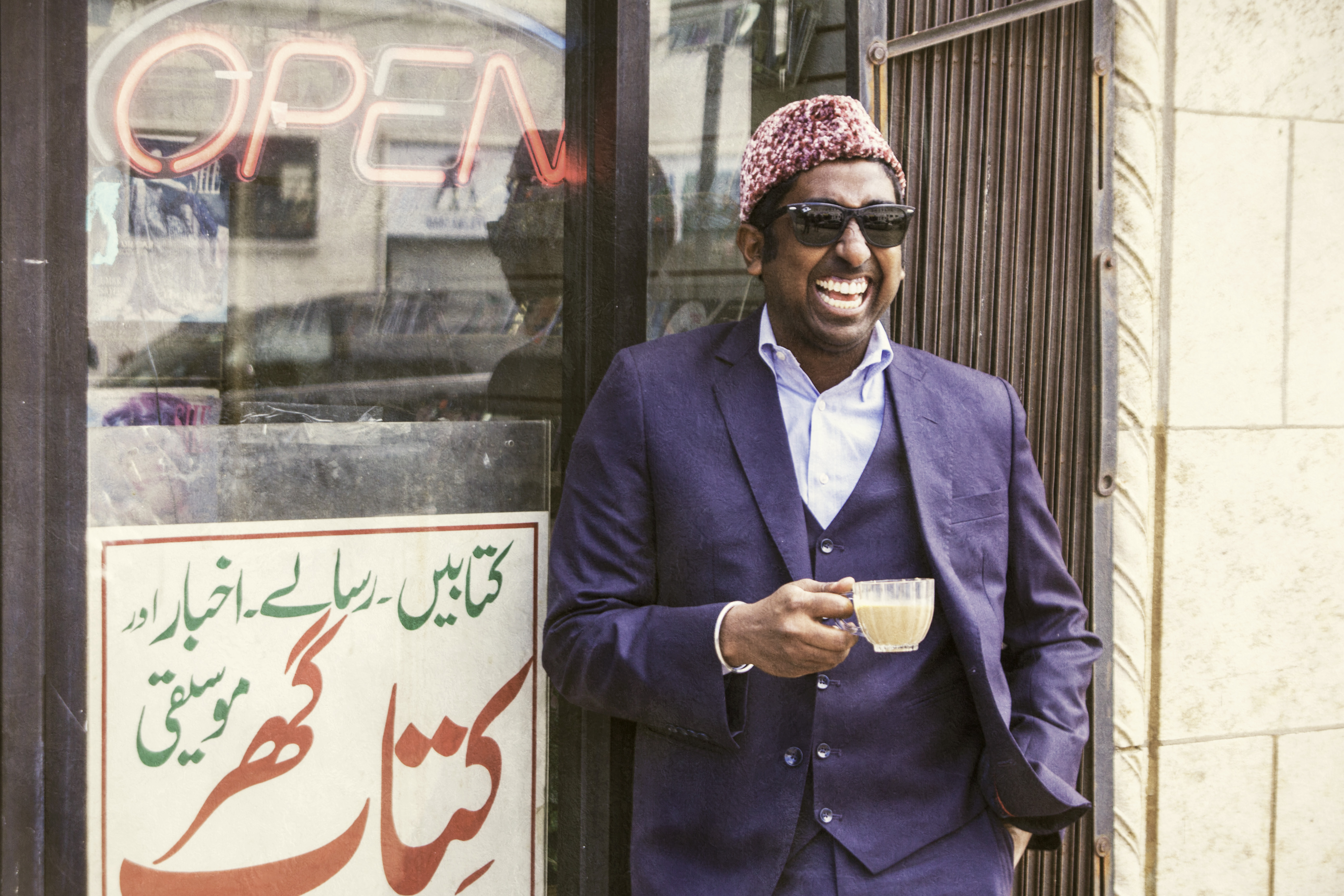

Background information
- Also known as: Zeshan B
- Born: Zeshan Bagewadi; June 27, 1987 (age 39); Chicago, Illinois, U.S.
- Genre: Soul
- Occupations: Musician; singer-songwriter
- Instrument: Harmonium
- Label: Minty Fresh
- Website: www.zeshanb.com

Zeshan Bagewadi (born June 27, 1987), known professionally as Zeshan B, is an American singer, multi-instrumentalist, songwriter and recording artist from Chicago, Illinois. His debut album Vetted was released on April 7, 2017.

Bagewadi was featured in the "10 New Artists You Need to Know: April 2017" article by Rolling Stone. On August 10, 2017, he made his television debut on The Late Show with Stephen Colbert where he performed "Cryin' in the Streets".

== Early life and career ==
The start of Zeshan's musical career can be traced back to high school where he joined choir, both gospel choir and regular choir, as a sophomore. Under the guidance of his choir director, Zeshan was directed towards a voice teacher who was also an opera singer for the Chicago Lyric. Zeshan's new vocal teacher discovered his ability for singing opera and began prepping him for a career in opera. Zeshan went on to study at Northwestern University's Bienen School of Music. After graduating with his Bachelors, and later his Masters, Zeshan was immediately hired by opera companies, making his debut performance in New York in Don Giovanni: Mozart Opera.

Early on in his opera career, Zeshan started to feel the constraints of pursuing classical music. He formed a world music string band with some of his colleagues and the left the world of opera behind him.
