= Etretat Gardens =

Garden in Étretat, France

Coordinates: 49°42′38″N 0°12′23″E

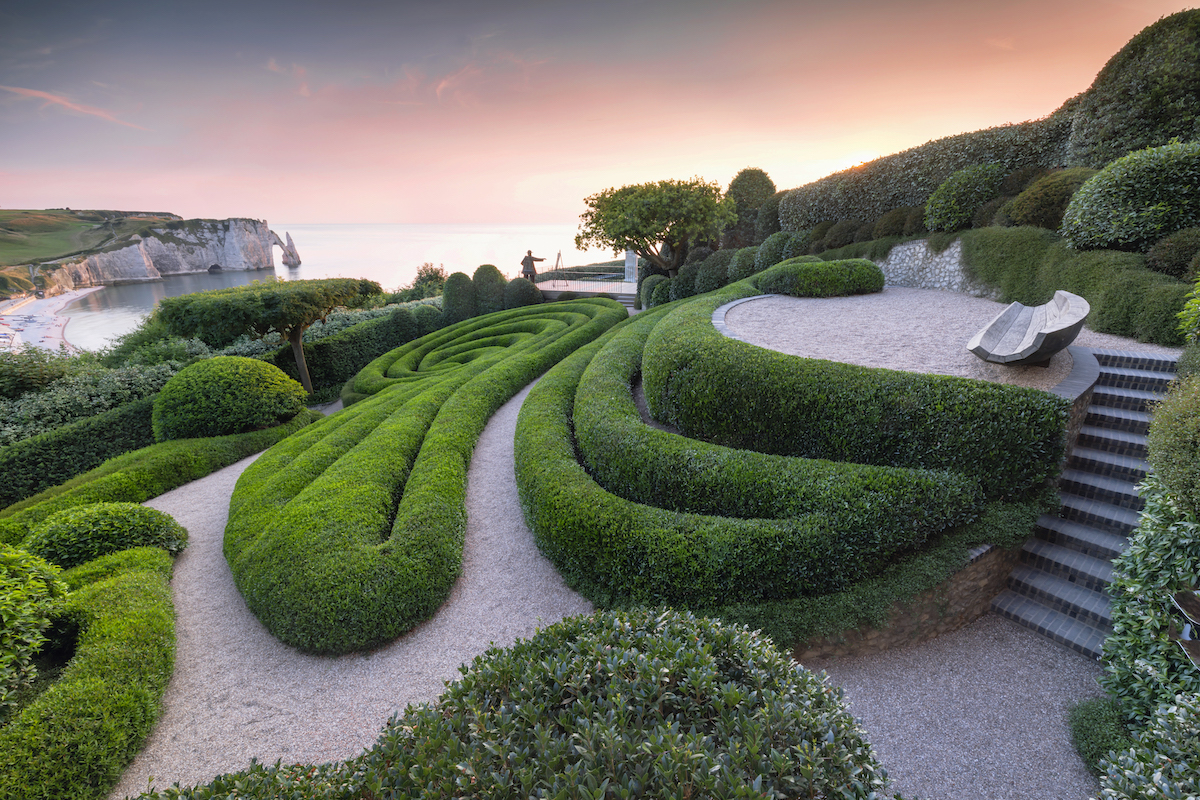
The view from the Etretat Gardens

The Étretat Gardens (French: Les Jardins d'Étretat) is a cliff-top experimental topiary garden located in the coastal town of Étretat, France, overlooking the English Channel. Inspired by the natural beauty and cultural heritage of Normandy, the garden surrounds the Belle Époque villa La Roxelane. Conceived by landscape architect Alexander Grivko in collaboration with his partner Mark Dumas, the project was brought to life by the design and landscaping company IL NATURE. Since its public opening in May 2017, Jardins d’Étretat has become one of the most visited tourist destinations in the region.

The garden features a permanent collection of sculptures and installations alongside temporary exhibitions. Every two years, as part of its artist residency program, Jardins d’Étretat invites artists through an open call to create large-scale, site-specific projects.

== History ==
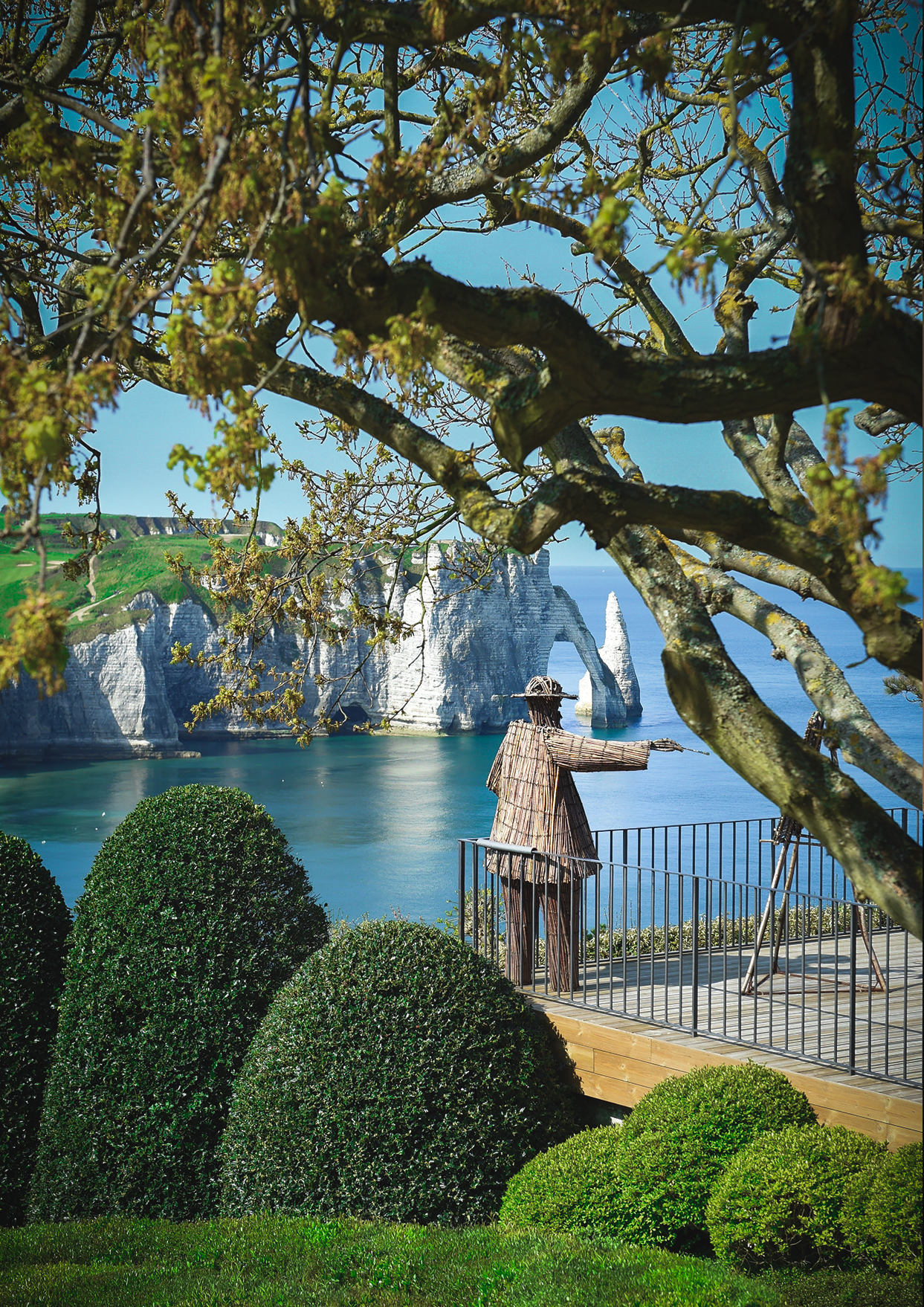
Sculpture of Monet and a view of the cliffs

By the late 19th century, Étretat had gained fame as a fashionable retreat for Parisian intellectuals. The picturesque fishing village attracted opera singers, theater professionals, writers, and painters, drawn to its dramatic landscapes. Between 1883 and 1885, Claude Monet created a series of masterpieces here, capturing the unique alabaster arches and the region’s ever-changing light—works now celebrated as icons of Impressionism.

In 1903, Parisian actress Madame Thébault initiated the creation of a garden atop the Amont cliff, where Monet had painted many of his Étretat landscapes. The garden was realized by gardener Auguste Lecanu from Fécamp, while her villa, La Roxelane, was designed by architect Louis Valentin in a Neo-Norman style. The villa’s half-timbered facade is complemented by flint detailing, typical of the region’s traditional architecture.

After Madame Thébault’s death, the villa passed through several owners. In 2014, it was acquired by landscape architect Alexander Grivko and his partner Mark Dumas, who sought to breathe new life into the garden. The majority of the garden's historical elements were recreated during the restoration, which started in 2015. Alexander Grivko, together with Natalia Bogomolova, Marcel Gherghelejiu, Vera Kalashnik, Valeriya Kanavina, Alina Trunova, Inna Korneeva, and Elena Popova, implemented methods borrowed from André Le Nôtre, the royal gardener of the Gardens of Versailles. It took Grivko and his team 24 months to acquire the land, negotiate with the town hall to purchase an additional 3,000 square metres (32,000 sq ft), build hundreds of meters of low walls, import nearly 1,000 tonnes (980 long tons; 1,100 short tons) of earth, trace 2 kilometres (1.2 mi) of gravel paths, and plant 100,000 feet of evergreens.

By 2017, Jardins d’Étretat was opened to the public.

== Concept and Design ==
Jardins d’Étretat is arranged into seven thematic parts (Jardin Avatar, Jardin Impressions, Jardin d'Amont, Jardin Zen, Jardin Aval, Jardin La Manche, Jardin Émotions), all inspired by the history and landscapes of Normandy. The topiary compositions echo the fluidity of natural phenomena: the curves of the shrubs mimic the waves of the sea, the sway of the wind, and the contours of the cliffside. At the heart of the garden lies a striking topiary whirlpool, a central motif symbolizing renewal, which also appears in the Jardins d’Étretat logo.

The garden primarily features evergreen shrubs, but it evolves throughout the year with blooms in shades of white, pink, and purple. Conceived by Alexander Grivko, Jardins d’Étretat serves as an "experimental laboratory" where landscape architecture blends with contemporary art, inviting visitors to engage with the region’s environment through an artistic lens.

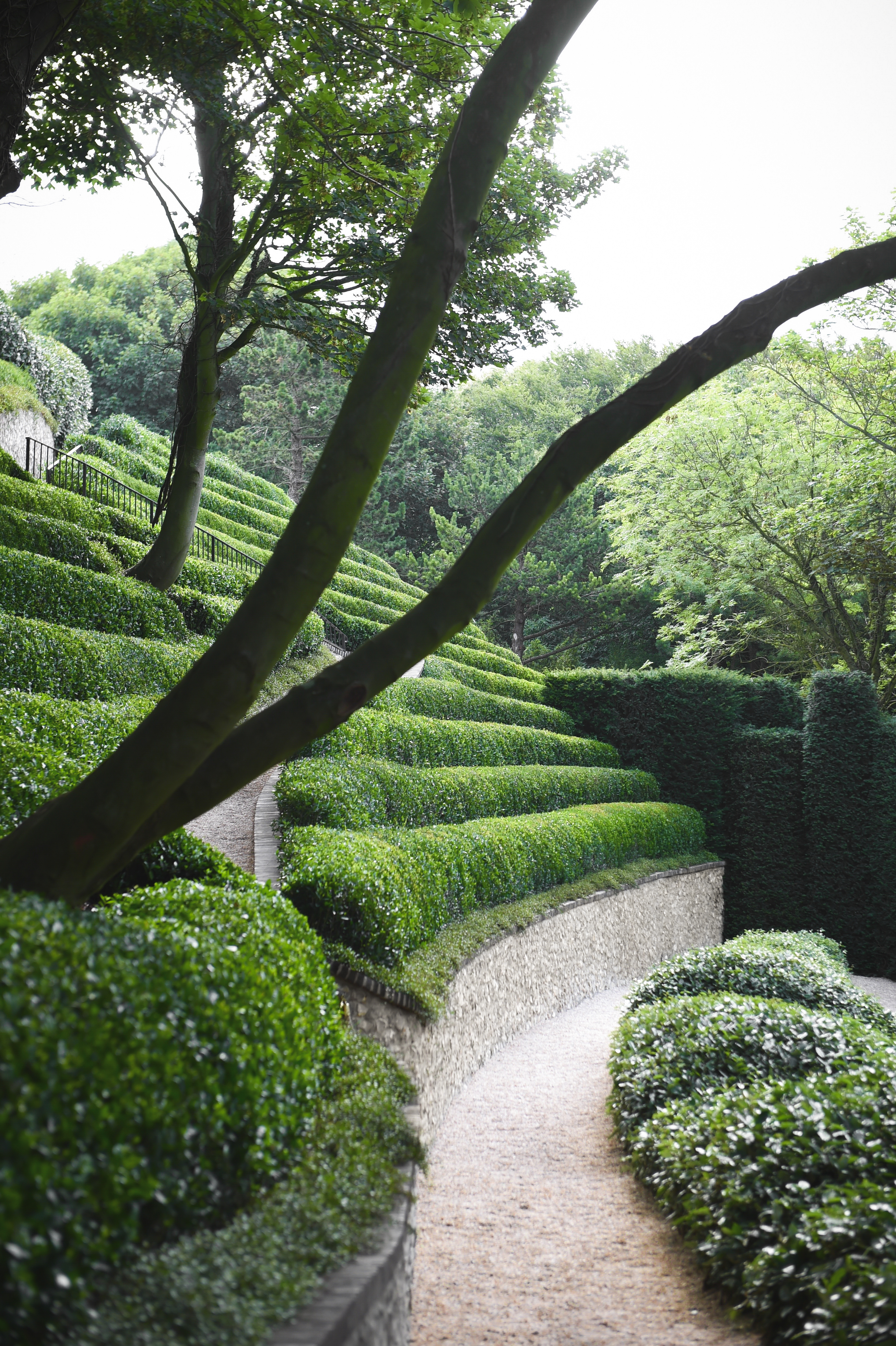
Jardin d'Amont

== Awards and recognition ==
In 2019, Jardins d’Étretat won the first prize in the "Best Historic Garden Restoration" category at the European Garden Award, organized by the Schloss Dyck Foundation and the European Garden Heritage Network. Additional accolades include two stars in the Michelin Guide Voyages & Cultures, and the prestigious “Jardin remarquable” label, awarded by the French Ministry of Culture.
