= The Genius of Komeda =

Studio album by Komeda
- Released: 24 September 1996
- Recorded: 1995
- Genres: Pop, rock
- Labels: North of No South, Minty Fresh
- Producers: Komeda; Pelle Henricsson; Eskil Lövström

Komeda chronology
Plan 714 till Komeda (1995)	The Genius of Komeda (1996)	What Makes it Go? (1998)

Professional ratings
Review scores
Source	Rating
AllMusic	3/5 stars
NME	7/10
Lollipop Magazine	Positive
Pitchfork	6.6/10

The Genius of Komeda is the second full-length studio album by Swedish band Komeda. Released in 1996, this was the first Komeda release sung in English. Licensed from Swedish record label North of No South to Minty Fresh, this was Komeda's first record to be given an international release.

The album was packaged as if it were a compilation with a (mainly) fake back catalogue based on an idea by the band's graphic designers. In a 2020 interview with the Jeffrey Podcast, bass player Marcus Holmberg chose this as his favourite Komeda album.

Its pop/rock sound brought about comparisons to Minty Fresh labelmates The Cardigans and also Stereolab.

== Track listing ==
All songs written by Komeda

1. "More is More"
2. "Fire"
3. "Rocket Plane (Music on the Moon)"
4. "Boogie Woogie / Rock'n'Roll"
5. "Disko"
6. "Top Star"
7. "Light o' My Life"
8. "If"
9. "Frolic"
10. "In Orbit"
11. "Arbogast"
12. "New New No"
