= Prototypes (band) =

French indie rock band

- Origin: France
- Genre: Indie rock
- Years active: 2003–present
- Labels: MusicMachine/Boxson (France), Minty Fresh Records (USA)
- Members: Stephane Bodin; Isabelle Le Doussal; François Marche

Prototypes are an indie rock band from France. The band comprises Stephane Bodin (bass, synths), Isabelle Le Doussal, known on-stage as "Bubble Star" (vocals), and François Marche (guitar).

== History ==
In 2006, a song from the band's U.S. self-titled debut album, "Who's Gonna Sing?", was featured in an advertisement for the Apple iPod Shuffle.

In 2008, their song "Je ne te connais pas" ("I do not know you") was featured in a Mitsubishi Outlander commercial. The same song was also featured in a BMW 1 Series television commercial in Germany in 2007, as well as in an episode of The L Word.

In 2010, the song "Je Ne Te Connais" was featured in Gossip Girl season 4 episode 2, "Double Identity".

== Discography ==
=== Albums ===
- Tout le monde cherche quelque chose à faire (2004)
- Mutants Médiatiques (2005)
- Prototypes (2006) - first U.S. album with tracks from their previous two French albums
- Synthétique (2008)
