= Pop På Svenska =

Studio album by Komeda
- Released: 1993
- Genres: Pop, rock
- Label: North of No South
- Producers: Komeda; Pelle Henricsson

Komeda chronology
Pop På Svenska (1993)	Plan 714 till Komeda (1995)

Pop På Svenska is the debut album by Swedish band Komeda. It was originally released in 1993 in Sweden on the North of No South label. Lars Henrik Andersson (Ray Wonder, Hank, LHA) was a band member in this release. Most of the songs are sung in the band's native language, although the pop/rock sound they are known for is firmly in place. The songs were originally written in English but later changed to Swedish following an idea from drummer Jonas Holmberg to sing in their own language.

The centre of the CD has the words "The parking of trolls must cease to exist", a nonsense statement that came to Jonas Holmberg in a dream. The band had originally hoped to inscribe this in the centre of the vinyl release, but the album was never released on vinyl.

In 2001 this album was combined with the Plan 714 till Komeda EP and issued by Minty Fresh to international markets.

== Track listing ==
All songs written by Komeda (Henrik Andersson, Jonas Holmberg, Marcus Holmberg, Lena Karlsson)

1. "Oj vilket liv!"
2. "Bonjour Tristesse"
3. "Sen dommar"
4. "Ad Fontes"
5. "Vackra kristaller"
6. "Medicin"
7. "Feeling Fine"
8. "Vals på skare"
9. "Snurrig bossanova"
10. "Stjärna"
11. "Glöd"
12. "En promenix"
13. "Borgo"
14. "Mod"
