= Hole in the Wall, Sliema =

Restaurant in Sliema, Malta

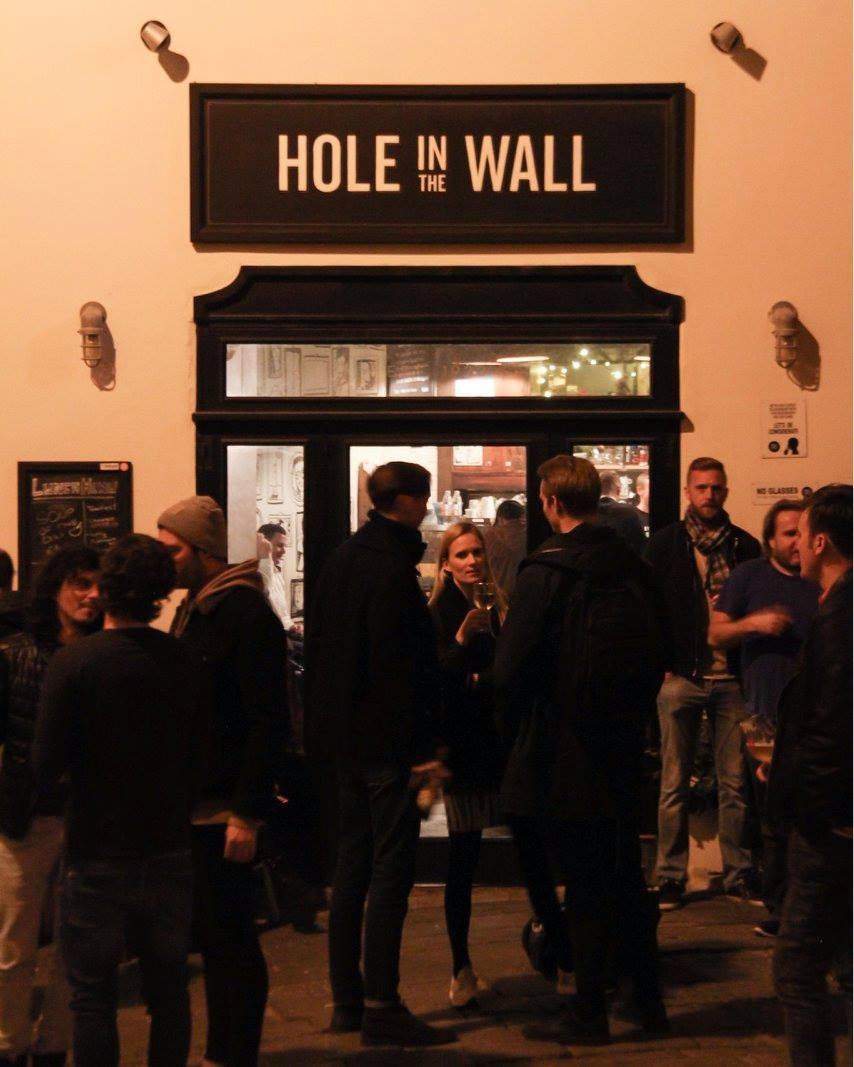
A pic of the Hole in the wall, Sliema, from the outside

The Hole in the Wall is a restaurant and bar in Sliema, Malta.

According to The Times of Malta, it is the oldest bar in Sliema. The Lovin Malta website calls it one of the oldest. According to the bar's website, it was originally a stables, and was turned into a bar in 1922 by Manuel Scicluna. The website notes "At the time, it was literally a hole in the wall, with no seating & selling take-away wine from huge vats." Originally the owners sold wine from vats, to off-duty airmen and soldiers, who referred to the then unnamed venue as "the hole in the wall".

From 1959 to 2005, the bar was owned and operated by Joseph Mifsud, followed by Spiru Micallef, then Anthony Bartolo and his sons. The Bartolos were from a family that specialised in food and catering, and the family owned several restaurants, including one next door. According to The Times of Malta, subsequent owners made bad management decisions, and the venue was in decline.

Indie rock musician Ian Schranz and his brother bought the bar in 2015 on a dare, and had to spend their first six months learning how bars operate. Schranz described the bar as a sports bar where male patrons arrived in a group, to watch sporting events on TV, got loudly drunk, and hooted and hollered at women passing on the street. Schranz and his brother made changes to attract a different clientele, starting with no longer tuning in to sporting events.

When The Times of Malta reported that the government of Malta had shut down all pubs and restaurants as a precaution arising from the spread of the COVID-19 virus it noted that The Hole in the Wall had already shut down, due to the downturn in business due to the virus.
