= Étretat =

- Commune
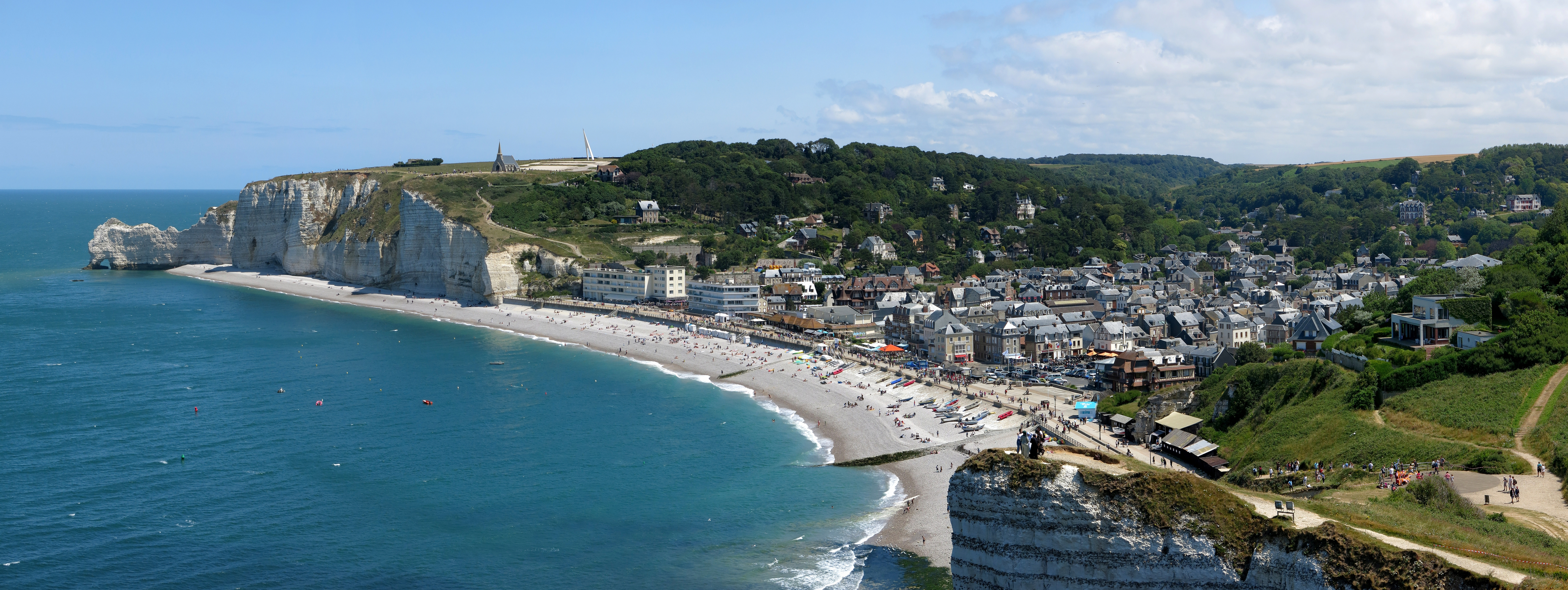
- View of Étretat

- Coat of arms
- Location of Étretat
- Location within France Location within Normandy
- Coordinates: 49°43′N 0°13′E
- Country: France
- Region: Normandy
- Department: Seine-Maritime
- Arrondissement: Le Havre
- Canton: Octeville-sur-Mer
- Intercommunality: Le Havre Seine Métropole

Government
  - Mayor (2026–32): Philippe Laferrière
- Area^{1}: 4.07 km^{2} (1.57 sq mi)
- Elevation: 8 m (26 ft)
- Highest elevation: 102 m (335 ft)
- Lowest elevation: 0 m (0 ft)
- Population (2023): 1,102
  - Density: 271/km^{2} (701/sq mi)
- Time zone: UTC+01:00 (CET)
  - Summer (DST): UTC+02:00 (CEST)
- INSEE/Postal code: 76254 /76790
- ^{1} French Land Register data, which excludes lakes, ponds, glaciers > 1 km^{2} (0.386 sq mi or 247 acres) and river estuaries.

Étretat (French pronunciation: [etʁəta]) is a commune in the Seine-Maritime department in the Normandy region of Northwestern France. It is a tourist and farming town situated about 32 km (20 mi) northeast of Le Havre, at the junction of the D 940, D 11 and D 139 roads. It is located on the coast of the Pays de Caux area.

== The cliffs ==
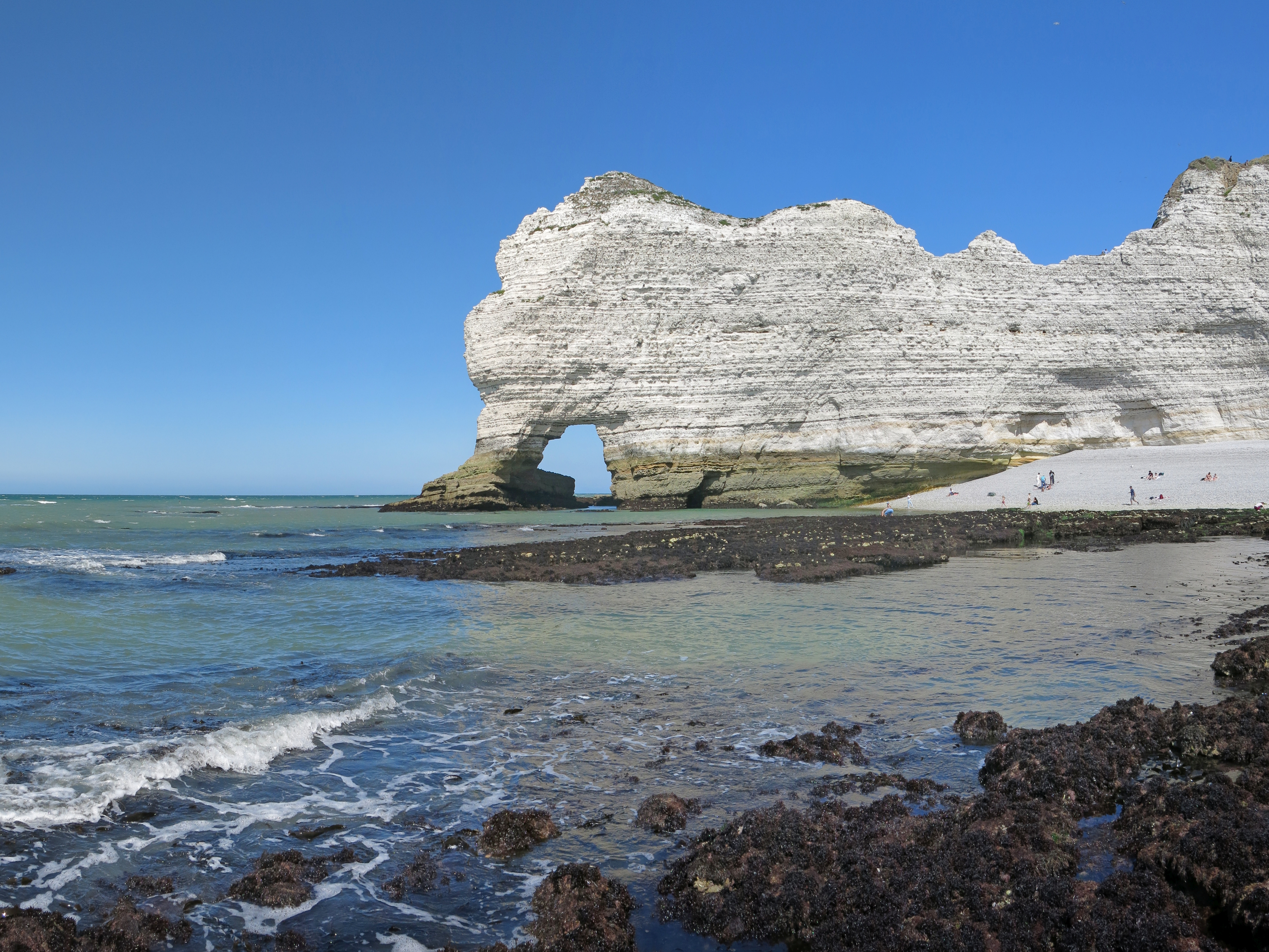
One of the chalk cliffs in Étretat: Porte d'Amont

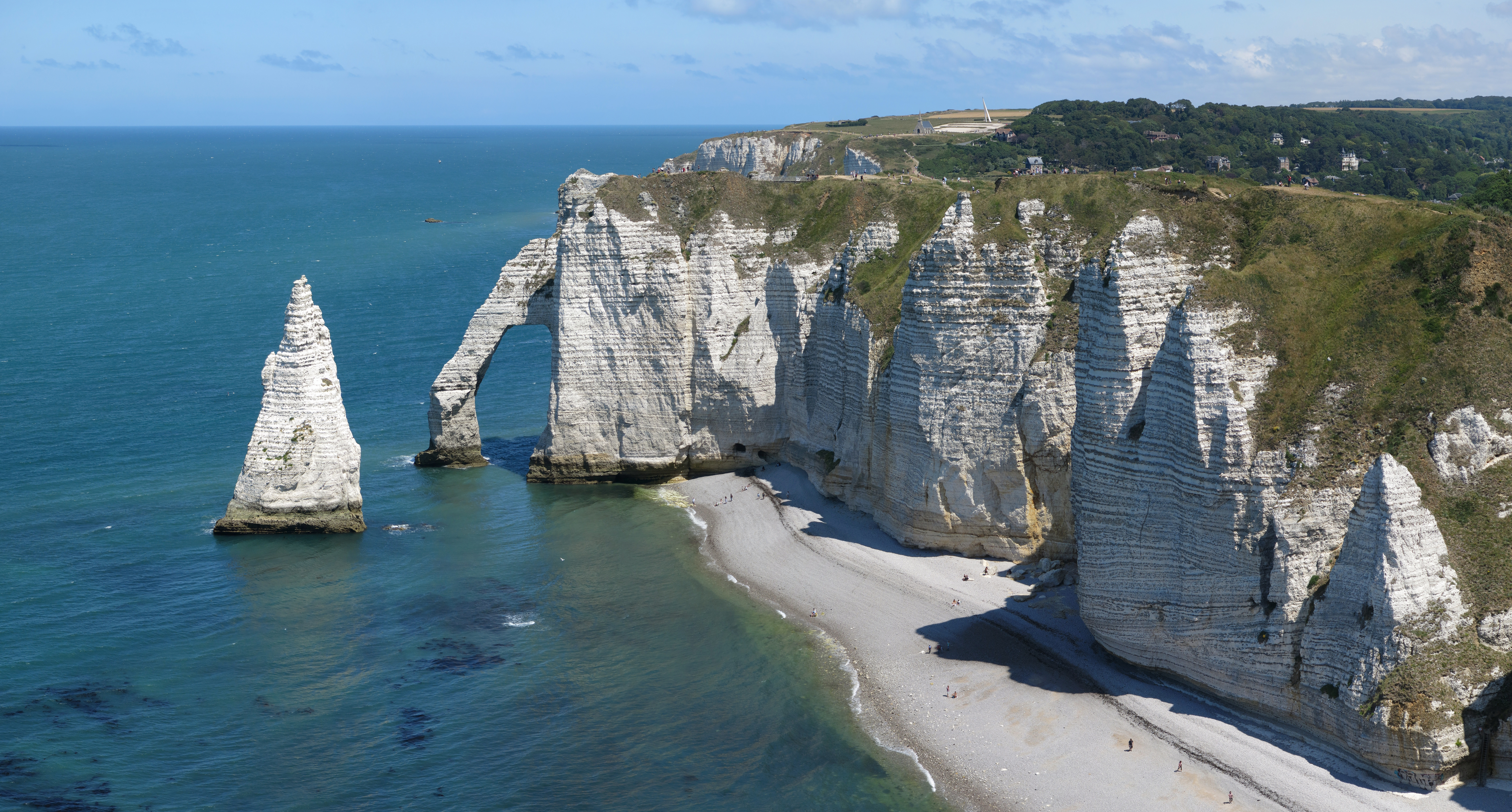
Panorama of the cliffs at Porte d'Aval

Étretat is best known for its chalk cliffs, including three natural arches and a pointed formation called L'Aiguille or the Needle, which rises 70 metres (230 ft) above the sea. The Étretat Chalk Complex, as it is known, consists of a complex stratigraphy of Turonian and Coniacian chalks. Some of the cliffs are as high as 90 metres (300 ft).

These cliffs and the associated resort beach attracted artists including Eugène Boudin, Charles Daubigny, Gustave Courbet and Claude Monet. They were featured prominently in the 1909 Arsène Lupin novel The Hollow Needle by Maurice Leblanc. They also feature in the 2014 film Lucy, directed by Luc Besson.

Two of the three famous arches are visible from the town, the Porte d'Aval, and the Porte d'Amont. The Manneporte is the third and the biggest one, and cannot be seen from the town.

The GR 21 long-distance hiking path (Le Havre to Le Tréport) passes through the town.

== The White Bird ==
Étretat is known for being the last place in France from which the 1927 biplane The White Bird (L'Oiseau Blanc) was seen. French World War I war heroes Charles Nungesser and François Coli were attempting to make the first non-stop flight from Paris to New York City, but after the plane's 8 May 1927 departure, it disappeared somewhere over the Atlantic. It is considered one of the great unexplained mysteries of aviation. A monument to the flight was established in Étretat, but destroyed during World War II, when the Germans occupied the area. A new and taller monument was constructed in 1963, along with a nearby museum.

== Demographics ==
Historical population
Year	Pop.	±% p.a.
1968	1,472	—
1975	1,525	+0.51%
1982	1,577	+0.48%
1990	1,565	−0.10%
1999	1,615	+0.35%
2007	1,518	−0.77%
2012	1,440	−1.05%
2017	1,291	−2.16%
2023	1,102	−2.60%
Source: INSEE

== Economy ==
The old Covered Market in Étretat

The economy of Étretat rests mainly on tourism, which gives the locals a growing commercial outlet. The city places itself as the number one tourist attraction in Normandy, as the site most visited along with Bénédictine distillery and museum at Fécamp, the Rouen Cathedral and the Claude Monet Foundation in Giverny.

During the eighteenth and nineteenth centuries the economy was supplemented by kelp-burning on the beaches. The white plumes of smoke by the shore can be clearly seen in George Inness' painting 'Étretat' (1875, Wadsworth Athenaeum). "The discovery and development of iodine-rich mineral deposits in Chile about the same time the iodine-from-kelp industry reached full vigor, dealt the kelp industry another severe blow in the late 1870s. However, small quantities of kelp continued to be harvested for soda, potash and iodine in northern France".

== Notable people ==
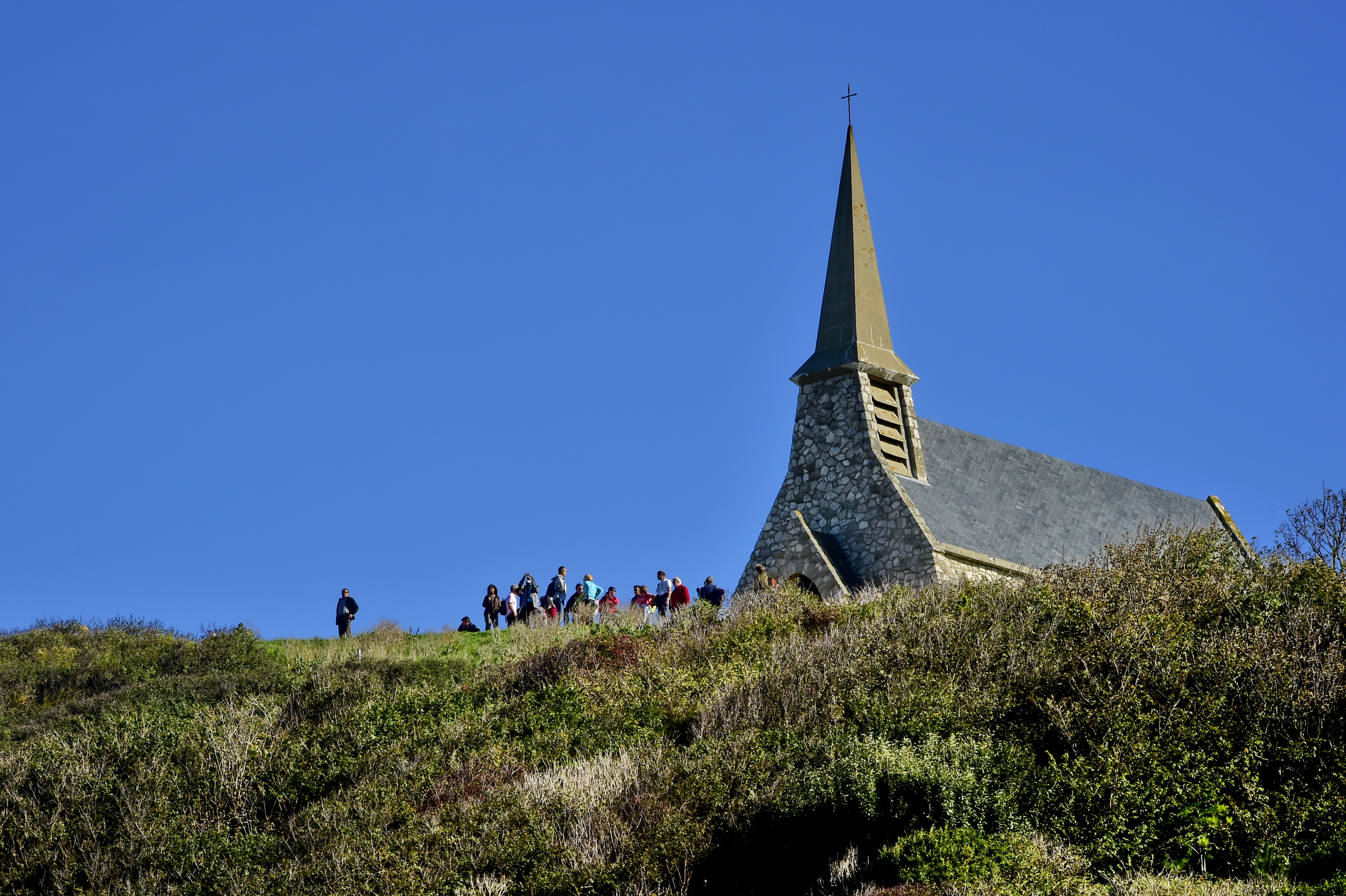
Chapelle Notre-Dame de la Garde

Étretat was the birthplace of Élie Halévy (1870–1937), philosopher and historian.

Guy de Maupassant (1850–1893) spent most of his childhood in Étretat, at "Les Verguies". In 1882 he wrote a short story for Le Gaulois entitled "The Englishman of Étretat" (L'Anglais d'Étretat), based on encounters in 1868, as a house guest of G. E. J. Powell, with the English poet Algernon Charles Swinburne, whom he had helped save from drowning. The dried human hand displayed on one of the tables was later acquired by Maupassant to adorn his Paris apartment; it inspired another short story, "The Flayed Hand" (La Main Écorchée). In 1883 he built his own house in Étretat, "La Guillette", in the Mediterranean style in "Le Grand Val", since renamed rue Guy-de-Maupassant.

Jean-Baptiste Faure (1830–1914), the great French operatic baritone whose career centred on Paris and London, also owned a villa there. A friend of the artist Édouard Manet and a keen collector of art, Faure did amateur paintings of the local area, including the scenic cliff.

Françoise Quintin-Ryszowska (1935–1967), a French poet and writer, was associated with Étretat through her family villa, Le Maupas. She was found dead at the foot of the Amont cliff in 1967; since 2025, her life and the circumstances of her death have been the subject of renewed media and documentary interest in France.

Claude Monet did several paintings in the area particularly of the natural cliff arches and stacks.

Jacques Offenbach had a villa there called “Villa d'Orphée”, named after his operetta, Orpheus in the Underworld.

== In popular media ==
Much of the filming for the fifth episode of the first season of Lupin was completed in and near the commune. This location is significant because Maurice Leblanc, the creator of the character Arsène Lupin (a fictional master thief) featured in 17 novels and 39 novellas, lived in the commune. He wrote much of the series at his home. (In total, Leblanc wrote over 60 novels and short stories.) That home is now the Clos Lupin Museum.

== Gallery: Étretat in paintings ==
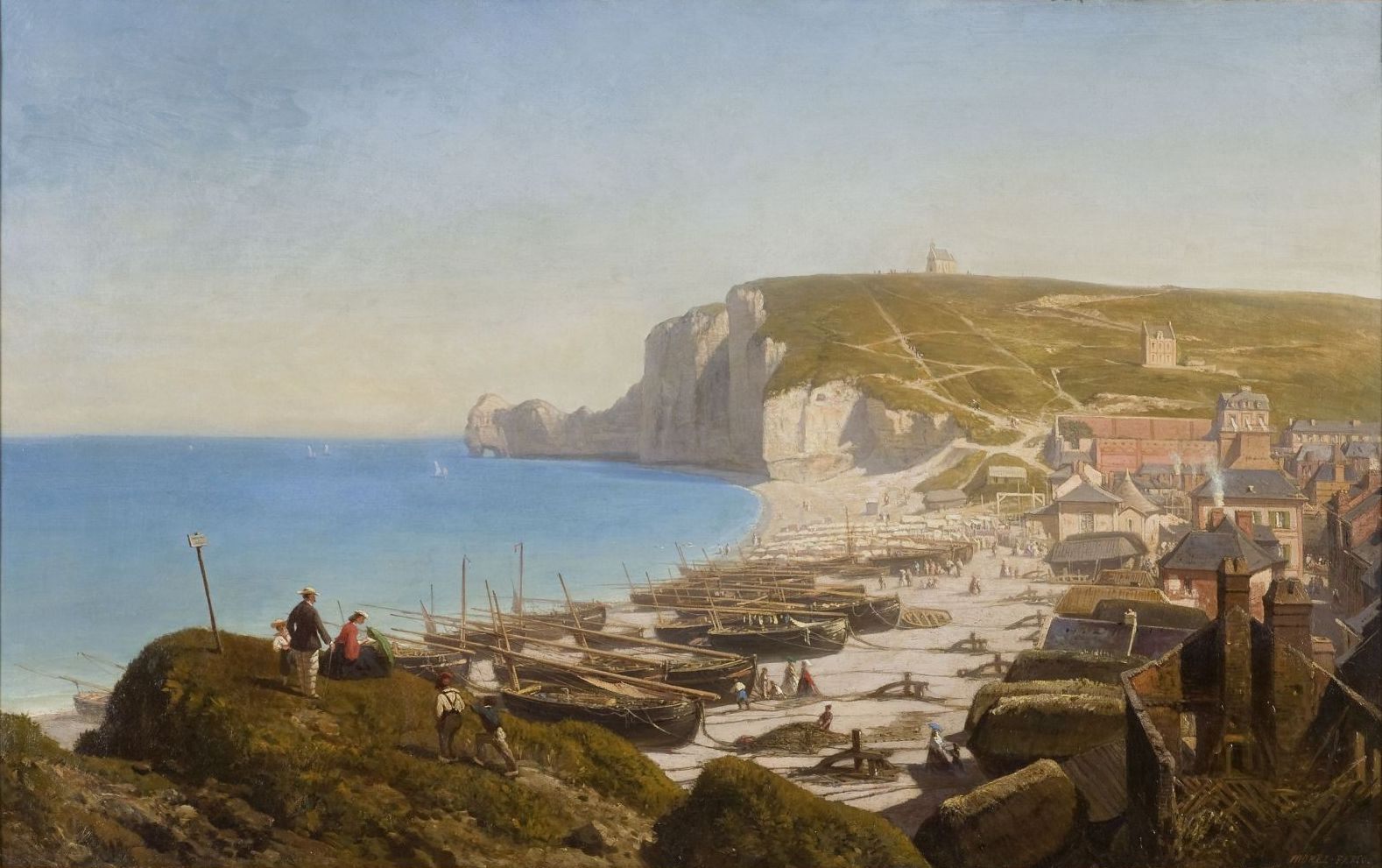
Panoramic view of Etretat (Antoine Léon Morel-Fatio, 1860)

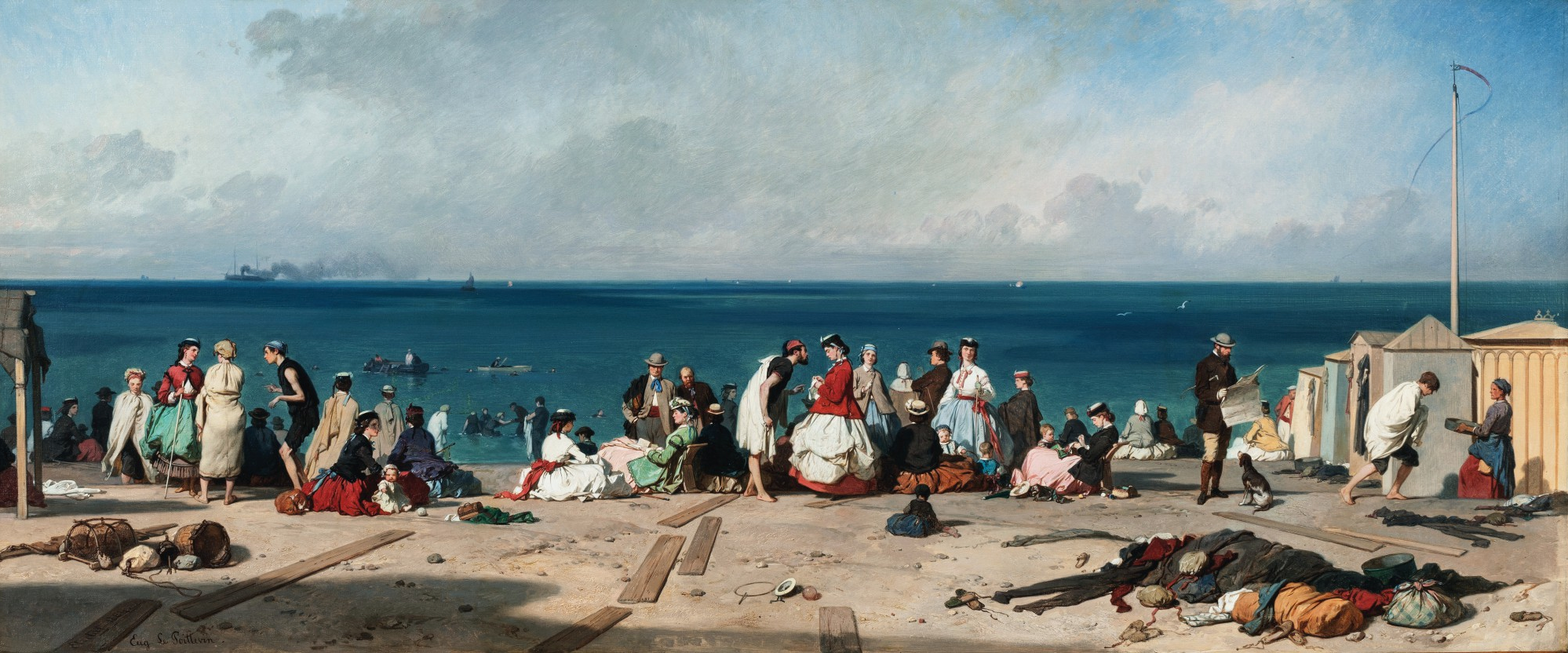
The Seaside Baths, Etretat Beach (Eugène Lepoittevin, 1864)

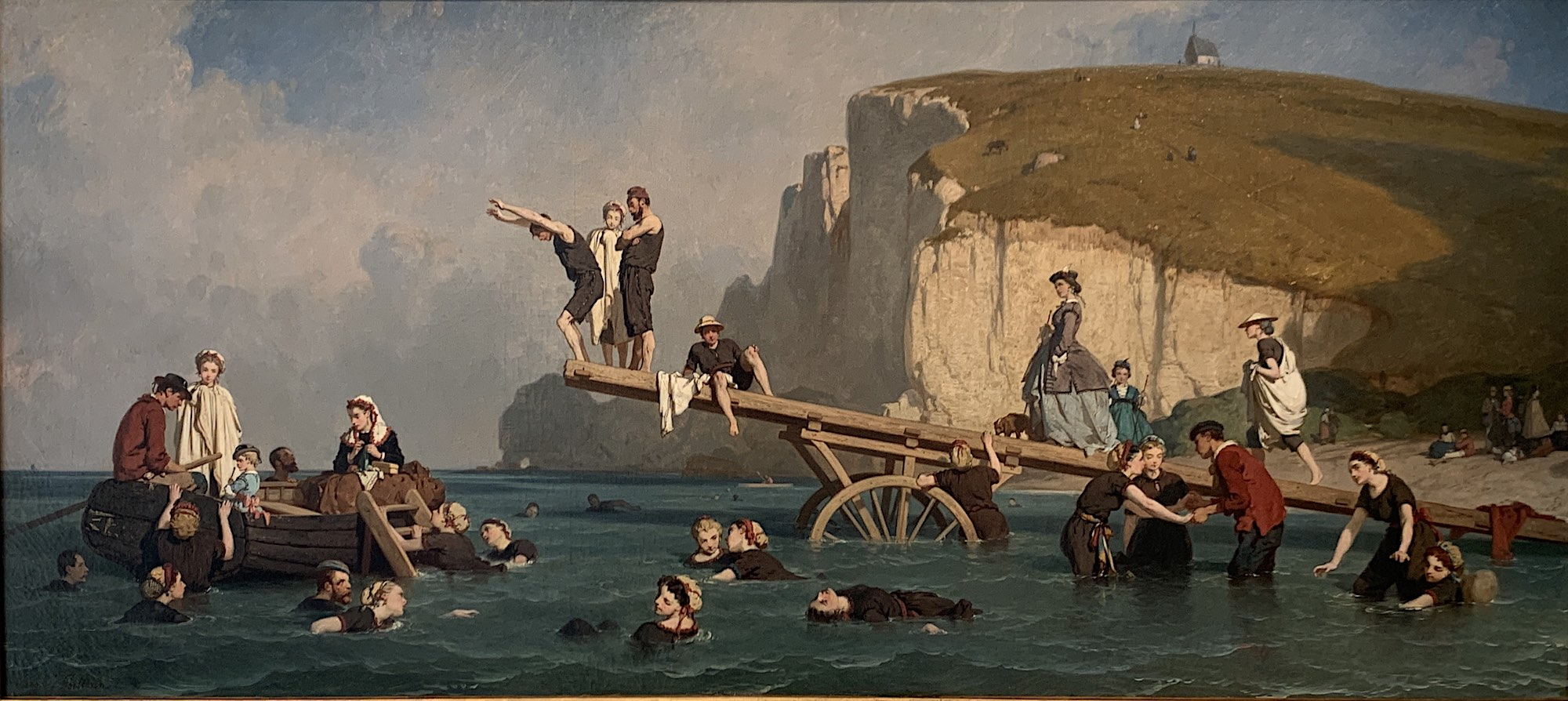
Sea bathing in Étretat (Eugène Lepoittevin, 1866)

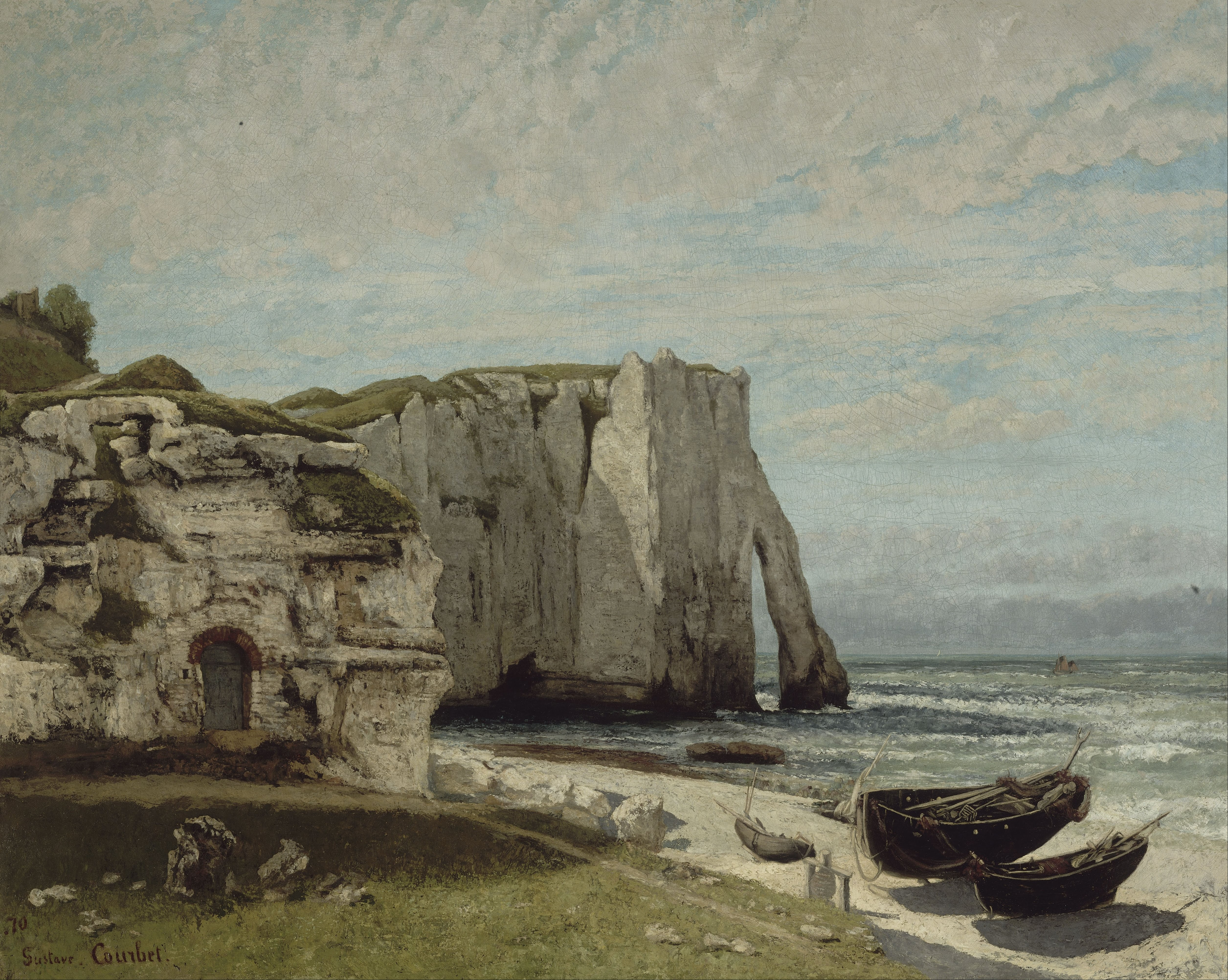
The cliffs of Étretat after the storm (Gustave Courbet, 1870)

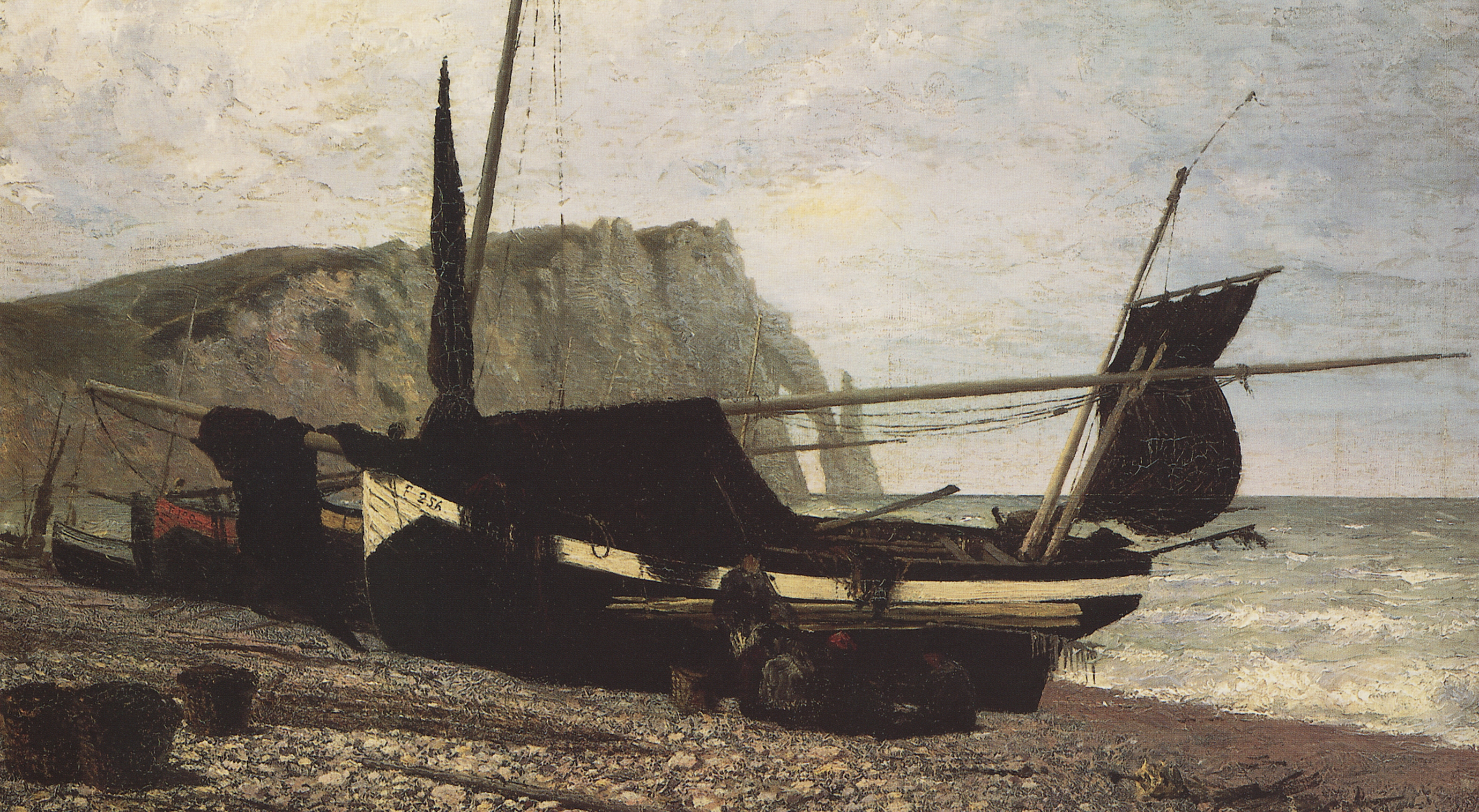
A fishing boat in Étretat, Normandy (Vasily Polenov, 1874)

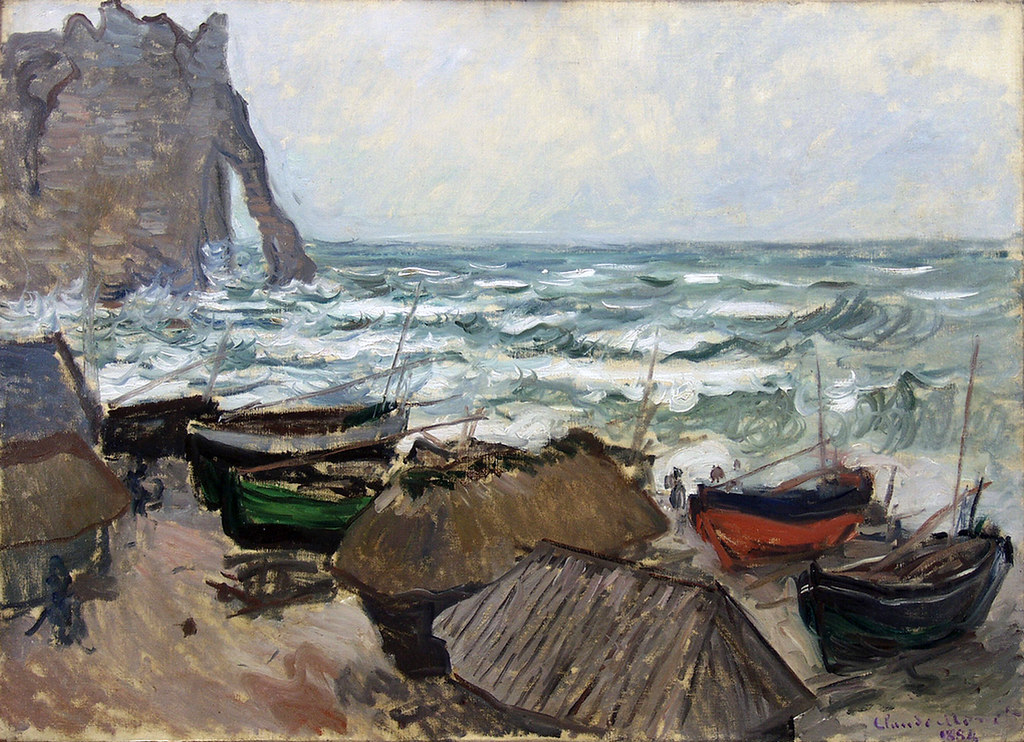
Hollowed Cliff near Étretat (Claude Monet, 1883)

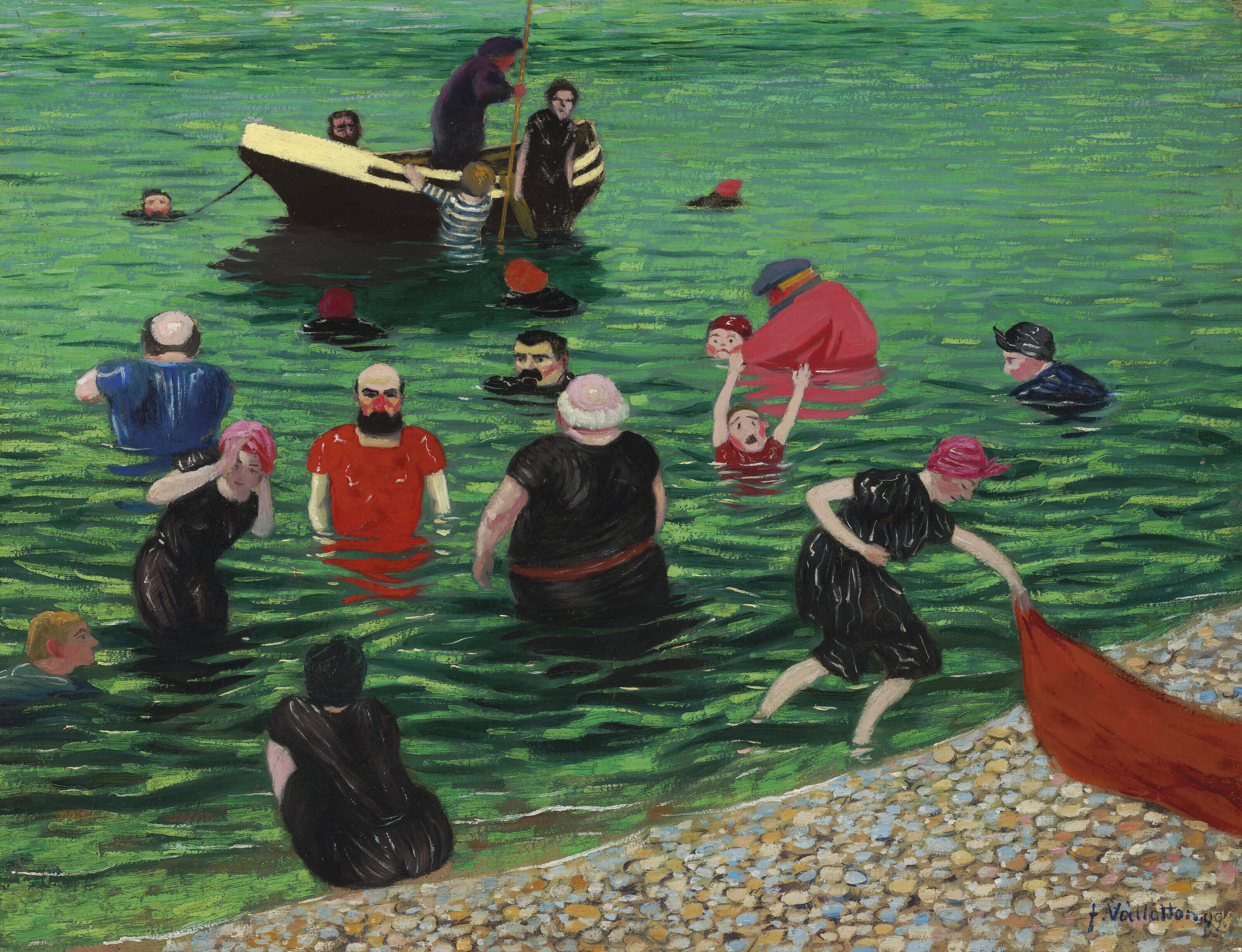
Swimming in Étretat (Félix Vallotton, 1899)

== See also ==
- Communes of the Seine-Maritime department
- Etretat Churchyard
- Etretat Gardens
