= Minty Fresh =

American independent record label

- Founded: 1993
- Founder: Jim Powers
- Genre: Rock
- Country of origin: United States
- Location: Chicago, Illinois

Minty Fresh is an American independent record label founded in Chicago in 1993 by Jim Powers. Anthony Musiala joined the label at its inception and later served as managing director. Its early releases included singles by Liz Phair and Veruca Salt, and it issued The Cardigans' first U.S. release.

== History ==
Powers founded Minty Fresh after leaving Zoo Entertainment. During its first year, the label released singles by Love Jones and Phair. Its 1994 release of Veruca Salt's "Seether" brought national attention to the band and label. In 2002, Minty Fresh spun off Mini Fresh as a children's-music label.

By 2015, Minty Fresh also operated as a music publisher and synchronization-licensing company. The label continued releasing music in the 2020s, including a co-release of Sarah Shannon's Demo 98 in 2023 and Dead Mint's self-titled debut album in 2025.

== Artists ==
- All India Radio
- The Aluminum Group
- Lindsay Anderson
- Astrid Swan
- Axe Riverboy
- Bark Bark Disco
- Beangrowers
- Bettie Serveert
- The Cardigans
- The Children's Hour
- Andrew Deadman
- Desperate Journalist
- Doktor Kosmos
- Drew Andrews
- Every Good Boy
- Ezra Furman and the Harpoons
- Firefox AK
- Floraline
- Fonda
- Friend + Doktor Kosmos
- Fugu
- The Hit Parade
- HushPuppies
- Husky Rescue
- Ivy
- Kahimi Karie
- Klee
- Komeda
- The Legendary Jim Ruiz Group
- Light FM
- The Living Blue
- Liz Phair
- Love Jones
- Mastretta
- Melony
- Mike Scott
- Miou Miou
- Musique Le Pop
- The Orange Peels
- Papas Fritas
- The Poems
- Prototypes
- Ralph's World
- Sepiatone
- Sarah Shannon
- Sébastien Schuller
- Sleep Thieves
- Soy Un Caballo
- Stump The Host
- Suburban Kids with Biblical Names
- The Sugarplastic
- Tahiti 80
- Trost
- Veruca Salt
- The Waterboys
- White Shoes & The Couples Company
- Zeshan B

== See also ==
- List of record labels
