= Complicated Animals =

Indie band

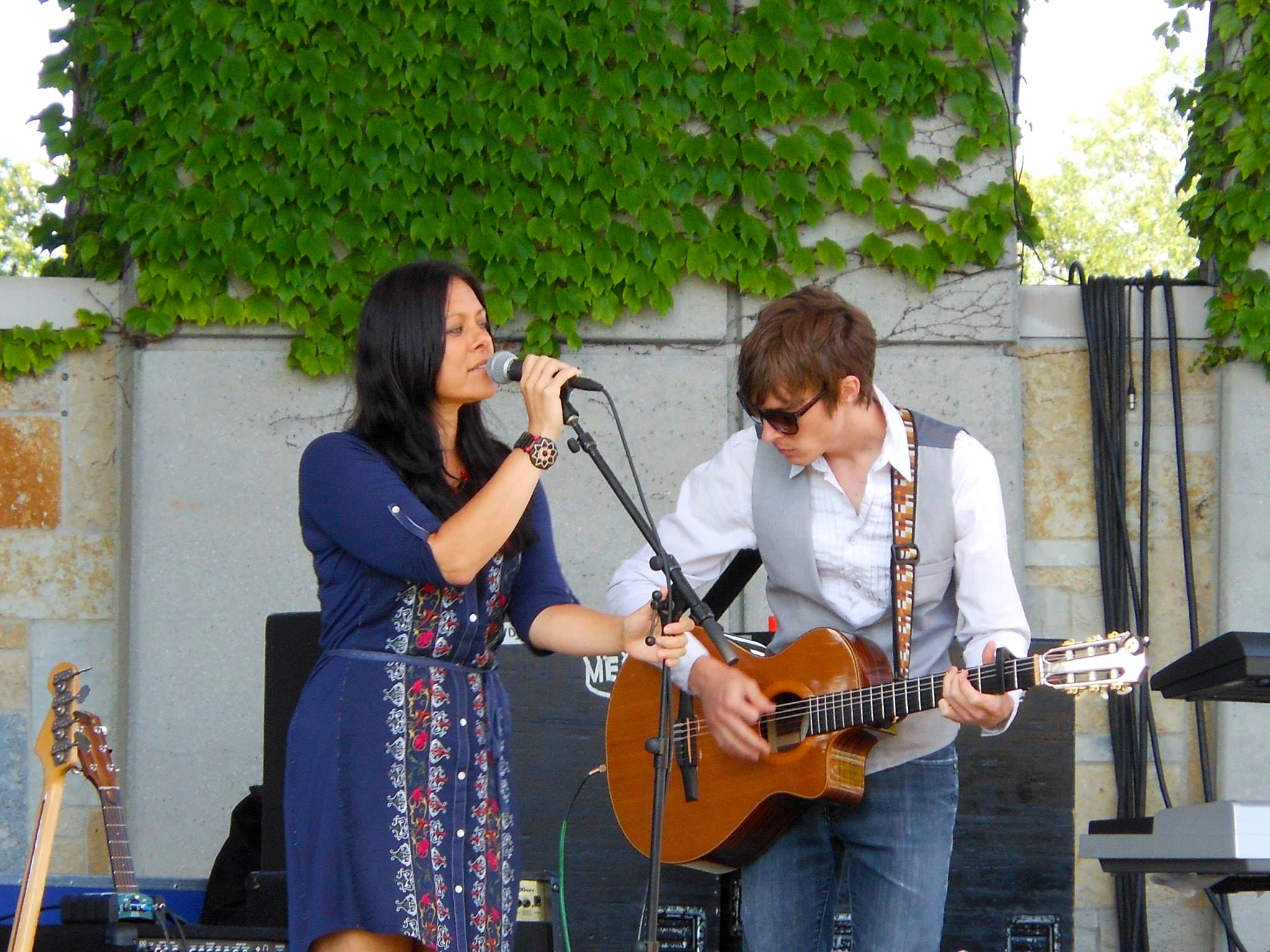
- Complicated Animals perform at Frederik Meijer Gardens in Grand Rapids, Michigan.

Background information
- Genres: Indie, alternative, bossa nova
- Years active: 2014–present
- Labels: Socialite Fiasco Music
- Members: Monica da Silva; Chad Alger
- Website: www.complicatedanimals.com

Complicated Animals is an indie band consisting of Brazilian American vocalist and songwriter Mônica da Silva, and musician and producer Chad Alger. The duo perform in their signature, self-coined "indie nova" genre, which mixes indie pop with Brazilian bossa nova.

== History ==
Mônica and Chad released their first album together, “Brasilissima”, under Mônica's name in 2011. The album featured songs in both English and Portuguese, and was produced by Chad Alger, with help from Mônica’s brother, Bruce Driscoll (Blondfire, Avicii, Freedom Fry). The first single, “Aí Então” gained attention from music critics and blogs alike, and caught the ear of Jacob Edgar, owner of Cumbancha Records and resident world music compiler for Putumayo World Music. The track was chosen from “tens of thousands of artists”, to be featured on the Putumayo World Music compilation “Brazilian Beat”. Another track from their CD, the upbeat, psychedelic-inspired “That’s Not The Way” was later chosen by the music director of ESPN to be played during the programming of The World Cup in 2014.

== Discography ==
=== Studio Albums ===
- In This Game EP (2015, Socialite Fiasco Music)

=== Singles ===
- Show Me (2018, Socialite Fiasco Music)
- Times Like These (2020, Socialite Fiasco Music)
- Watcher (2024, Socialite Fiasco Music)

== TV and film placements ==
- Phoenix in the Netflix movie The Last Summer (2019, Gulfstream Pictures)
