= Cydonia =

Cydonia commonly refers to:

- Cydonia (Mars), a region of the planet Mars
- Cydonia or Kydonia, an ancient settlement at modern Chania in Greece

Cydonia may also refer to:

== Music and videogames ==
- Cydonia (album), a 2001 album by The Orb
- "Cydonia", a track on 1999 Crimson Glory album Astronomica
- Cydonia: Mars - The First Manned Mission, a 1998 videogame
- "Knights of Cydonia", a 2006 song by Muse
- "New Cydonia", a song on Starcadian's album Deep Cuts.

== Places ==
- Roman Catholic Diocese of La Canea, a Latin Catholic titular see on Crete, Greece

== Science ==
- Cydonia (genus), the quince genus of plant in the Rosaceae family
- Cydonia group, a former taxonomic division of the Maleae or apple tribe in the Rosaceae
- 1106 Cydonia, an asteroid in the main asteroid belt

== Other ==
- Cydonia, a name for the ancient Greek goddess Athena
