= Glorious (Arty album) =

Studio album by Arty
- Released: 9 October 2015
- Recorded: 2014–15
- Genre: Progressive house; trance
- Length: 53:30
- Label: Insomniac; Interscope
- Producer: Arty

Arty albums chronology
Glorious (2015)	From Russia With Love (2020)

Singles from Glorious
- 1. "Up All Night" Released: 2 July 2014; 2. "Stronger" Released: 5 May 2015; 3. "Braver Love" Released: 21 August 2015

Glorious is the debut studio album by Russian electronic music producer and DJ Arty. It was released on 9 October 2015 through Insomniac Records and Interscope Records. The album features collaborations with multiple songwriters and singers, including Conrad Sewell, Clarence Coffee, Ray Dalton and Blondfire. The release date for Glorious was announced by Arty through Twitter on 12 August 2015, where he stated that listeners can expect "indie dance, old-school progressive, pop and French house inspired records" on the album. Glorious was influenced by parts of Arty's background and life as he produced the album, from what he described as his "emotional ups and downs". The record was well received by critics, who praised its production values and diverse track genres, pointing to Arty's versatility as an artist.

== Background ==
Glorious marks Arty's first venture in songwriting as an artist, as previously he only produced instrumental tracks in his bedroom-converted studio. Based on Arty, his first stint in the songwriter studio went awry, as he lacked the knowledge to technically explain his music to the writers, but his subsequent visits became easier as he brought instrumental parts of his tracks to be improved together with the melody and vocals. A few of the songwriters preferred to individually work on the instrumental parts in their home studios, but the others chose to tackle each track from scratch, thus Arty had to adapt to each of their approaches. The collaborators for the album were chosen by Arty's label Interscope Records, and studio meetings would be scheduled for Arty to verify if musical synergy can be established between him and the songwriters. Arty was especially interested in writing the lyrical aspects of his tracks although his native language was not English, due to his Russian upbringing. According to Arty, between 35-40 tracks were recorded for Glorious, but only those which fit the album's theme were selected for release.

The central theme of Glorious was to put out the two years of time spent by Arty to produce the album as a story, "printed there like a stamp," as stated by him. Glorious was also influenced by the emotional ups and downs experienced by Arty as he lived through his life, thus every track had a personal background relating to his prior chronicles. He picked "Last Kiss" as his favourite work from the album and stated that the track's inspiration came from "a hard time in a relationship", pointing to a heartache from a bad breakup. “When making [Last Kiss], I honestly felt better after I finished the track,” said Arty. “I had transferred all of my emotions into that musical form.” Arty was also able to experiment with different sounds on Glorious, as his contracts with labels Anjunabeats and Spinnin' Records restricts him from releasing pop-oriented songs through them.

== Critical reception ==
Professional ratings
Review scores
Source	Rating
We Got This Covered	4.5/5 stars

Glorious received positive reception from critics. John Cameron from We Got This Covered gave the album 4.5/5 stars and described it as "compelling" and "well-arranged" which "cements his legacy as one of contemporary EDM's most respectable artists". Particular praise came to the track "Stronger" where Cameron stated, "Everything about the track is grandiose – it’s bigger than genres or stage shows". He ended the review by applauding Arty's success in building an album with songs that flow meaningfully from one to another, and that each track manages to make a strong statement by themselves and as a whole. YourEDM 's Krystal Spence wrote that "it’s not just the stellar production value of each song that makes Glorious such a successful album; it’s the emotion behind each song as well", which encourages listeners to understand Arty on a personal level. The critic continued by noting the diversity of styles in the album's last quarter, but still praised each song for managing to fit within the record. Keith Warren from We Rave You commented that although the "classic Arty sound" can be heard in tracks such as "Braver Love" and "Stronger", many new sounds were experimented with by the artist in the other songs. He described "Inertia" as having a "disco house vibe with a modern twist", and "Last Kiss" which "showcases what a gifted pianist Arty is, combining an emotional melody with a catchy beat".

== Track listing ==
All tracks are written by Artyom Stolyarov, with additional writers listed below

No.	Title	Writer(s)	Length
1.	"Shadow"	Joe Gil	3:35
2.	"Glorious" (featuring Blondfire)	Erica Driscoll; Bruce Driscoll	3:57
3.	"Braver Love" (featuring Conrad Sewell)	Sewell	3:33
4.	"Up All Night" (featuring Angel Taylor)	Taylor; Toby Gad	4:07
5.	"Stronger" (featuring Ray Dalton)	Dalton; Gad; Ruth-Anne Cunningham	4:11
6.	"Inertia"		2:59
7.	"Closer to You" (featuring Clarence Coffee Jr.)	Coffee Jr.	3:37
8.	"Last Kiss"		2:44
9.	"Young Again" (featuring Bermuda Star)	B. Driscoll	4:28
10.	"Feel Your Love"	Laurel	3:44
11.	"Pink Roads"		4:32
12.	"Waste Your Time" (featuring Clarence Coffee Jr.)	Coffee Jr.; Wayne Hector; Marcus Lomax; Jordan Johnson; Stefan Johnson	3:23
13.	"Wicked"		3:41
14.	"Poison for Lovers"	Laurel	4:59
Total length:			53:30

== Personnel ==
Credits adapted from Allmusic

Technical and composing credits

- Artyom Stoliarov – primary artist
- Bruce Driscoll – primary artist, composer
- Erica Driscoll – primary artist, composer
- Clarence Coffee, Jr. – primary artist, composer
- Conrad Sewell – primary artist, composer
- Angel Taylor – primary artist, composer
- Ruth-Anne Cunningham – composer
- Ray Dalton – primary artist, composer
- Toby Gad – composer
- Joe Gil – composer
- Wayne Hector – composer
- Jordan Johnson – composer
- Stefan Johnson – composer
- Marcus Lomax – composer

== Charts ==
Chart (2015)	Peak; position
US Top Dance Albums (Billboard)	14
