= Jeremy Adelman (composer) =

American composer

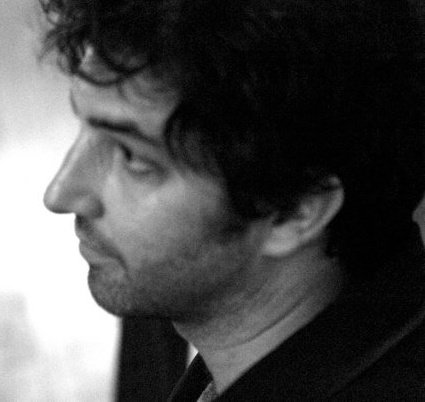

Background information
- Born: 1973 (age 52–53); Amityville, New York
- Origin: New York City
- Genres: Electronic Orchestral, Jazz, Pop, Indie rock, Alternative rock, Dance
- Occupations: Film Composer, Music Producer, Songwriter, Engineer,
- Instruments: Trumpet, Multi-instrumentalist
- Years active: 1989–present
- Member of: Milo Z

Jeremy Adelman (born 1973) is an American composer for film and television, trumpet player and multi-instrumentalist, and major-label music producer and arranger in genres including funk, indie and jazz. He is primarily known as the composer and songwriter for prime-time CW TV series Hart of Dixie starring Rachel Bilson.

== Biography ==
=== Early life and career ===
Adelman was born in Amityville, New York. He performed as an orchestral trumpeter and moved to NY in 1989 to study at the Juilliard School of Music. During this period he cultivated an interest in Jazz and studied further in Manhattan School of Music's world-renowned jazz program. Jeremy played in local blues, funk and R&B bands amidst the thriving NYC music scene of the early 90s. He then joined the Mercury Record's funk band Milo Z, managed by David Sonenberg, and played shows with legendary artists like Bon Jovi, Al Green, Maceo Parker, The Neville Brothers, The Meters, Chuck Brown & the Soul Searchers & Toots and the Maytals. He would return to Juilliard in 2001 to study composition with Stanley Wolfe.

== Composing ==
In 1996, Adelman composed for the 3rd season of Comedy Central's Viva Variety created by Michael Ian Black, Ben Garant and Thomas Lennon. His job involved composing & producing songs for guest stars to perform and/or sing including Ben Stiller, Shelley Long, Keenen Ivory Wayans, Carmen Electra, Whoopi Goldberg, Martha Stewart, David Cassidy, Buster Poindexter, Bobcat Goldthwait, Robin Leach, Abe Vigoda, Sandra Bernhard, and Erik Estrada. Jeremy collaborated with tomandandy on various film projects such as Fearless starring Jeff Bridges, Waking the Dead starring Billy Crudup and Jennifer Connelly & Arlington Road starring Tim Robbins.

== Indie pop ==
Adelman has produced and composed with Andy Chase of Ivy for Chase's band Brookville. Even composing the song "Nothing's Meant To Last" with Chase and Brazilian Girls Didi Gutman & Sabina Sciubba. Between 2002-2005, he toured as a member and performer in Brookville, sharing bills with Goldfrapp, Tahiti 80 and even appearing on KCRW's Morning Becomes Eclectic.

In 2003 he began performing as drummer for the band Blondfire and continued to perform as multi-instrumentalist with numerous bands appearing three times on Fearless Music.

== Motive ==
In 2001 he began working directly with ad agencies and created international music production house Motive Music Sound. He has been recognized for his musical compositions in various national and international campaigns with many prestigious awards including the Cannes Grand Prix, two London International Grand Prizes, an Emmy nomination, a Gold Andy, four Silver Clios and a One Show Pencil. He has also served as a panelist for the Billboard Film & TV conference with keynote speaker Clint Eastwood.

== Sleepy Rebels ==
In 2005, he started the band Sleepy Rebels on his label Powerful Company with Bruce Driscoll and Erica Driscoll. The band was successful on national licenses for TV shows and commercials. Soon he got sponsoring from CME's Media Pro Studios to shoot three music videos for the band's songs, "Unbelievable", "Magic Girl" and "Looking Glass". Sleepy Rebels collaborated over the course of three albums, World Record, Yellow Tree and the Christmas themed album, Bah Humbug. Sleepy Rebel's music has been used in ads for J. C. Penney, VW, Tide and many others. J. C. Penney chose to make the Sleepy Rebels' song "Unbelievable" their theme song for 2009.

== Discography ==
- 1994 - Milo Z - Basic Need to Howl - Trumpet
- 2000 - Anthony Robustelli - Trumpet
- 2002 - Bree Sharp - More B.S. - Horn, Trumpet
- 2002 - Rachael Sage - Flugelhorn, Trumpet
- 2004 - Paco - This Is Where We Live - Horn, Horn Arrangements, Group Member
- 2004 - Eugene Mirman - The Absurd Nightclub Comedy of Eugene Mirman - Composer
- 2005 - JJ Sansaverino - Sunshine After Midnight - Trumpet
- 2005 - Ashby - Looks Like You've Already Won - Horn, Horn Arrangements, Producer
- 2005 - Ivy - In the Clear - Additional Personnel, Guest Artist, Trumpet
- 2006 - The Mosquitos - Mosquitos III - Flugelhorn, Horn
- 2006 - Ezekial - Love and War - Trumpet
- 2006 - Brookville (band) - Life In The Shade - Synthesizer, Producer, Engineer, Drum Programming, Composer "Nothing's Meant To Last"
- 2008 - Blondfire - My Someday - Trumpet
- 2008 - Sleepy Rebels - World Record - Producer, Composer, Instrumentation, Vocals, Mixer, Group Member
- 2009 - Brookville (band) - Broken Lights - Composer, Programming
- 2010 - Lana Mír - Composer, Instrumentation
- 2012 - Sleepy Rebels - Bah Humbug! - Producer, Composer, Instrumentation, Vocals, Mixer, Group Member
- 2011 - Sleepy Rebels - Yellow Tree - Producer, Composer, Instrumentation, Vocals, Mixer, Group Member
- 2021 - Women of Tomorrow - album with Laura Bell Bundy - Producer, Composer, instrumentation, Vocals, Mixer, programmer

== Filmography ==
- 1997 - Viva Variety (TV Series) - Composer
- 1999 - Freakshow (Short) - Composer
- 2003 - Spot: The Professional (Short) - Composer
- 2005 - Turning Green - Performer
- 2006 - First Person Killers: Ronald DeFeo (TV Movie Documentary) - Composer
- 2008 - Fire & Ice - Soundtrack
- 2009 - Private Practice (TV Series) - Soundtrack
- 2009 - Weekend with my Mother (Feature Film) - Composer
- 2012 - A Conversation About Cheating with My Time Traveling Future Self (Short) - Composer
- 2012 - Sweet Little Lies :aka Minte-Ma Frumos (Feature Film) - Composer
- 2011 - 2015 - Hart of Dixie (TV Series) (49 Episodes) - Composer
- 2013 - Stupid Hype (TV Movie) - Composer
- 2014 - L.A. Rangers (TV Series) - Composer
- 2015 - Skits-O-Frenic (TV Series) - Composer
- 2015 - Becoming Santa (TV Movie) - Composer
- 2015 - Anti_Social (Short) - Composer
- 2017 - The Wanderers: The Quest of the Demon Hunter - Composer
- 2017 - The Story of Us with Morgan Freeman - Composer, additional music
- 2019 - The World Without You (Feature Film) directed by Damon Shalit- Composer
