= Sweet Little Lies =

Sweet Little Lies may refer to:

- Sweet Little Lies (2010 film), Japanese film
- Sweet Little Lies (2012 film), Romanian film
- Sweet Little Lies, 2010 novel by Lauren Conrad
- "Sweet Little Lies", a 2019 song by the singer Bülow
- "Sweet Little Lies", a song on the 2022 Beautiful Mind (album) by Rod Wave

== See also ==
- "Little Lies", a song by the English/American rock band Fleetwood Mac
