= Mônica da Silva =

American singer-songwriter

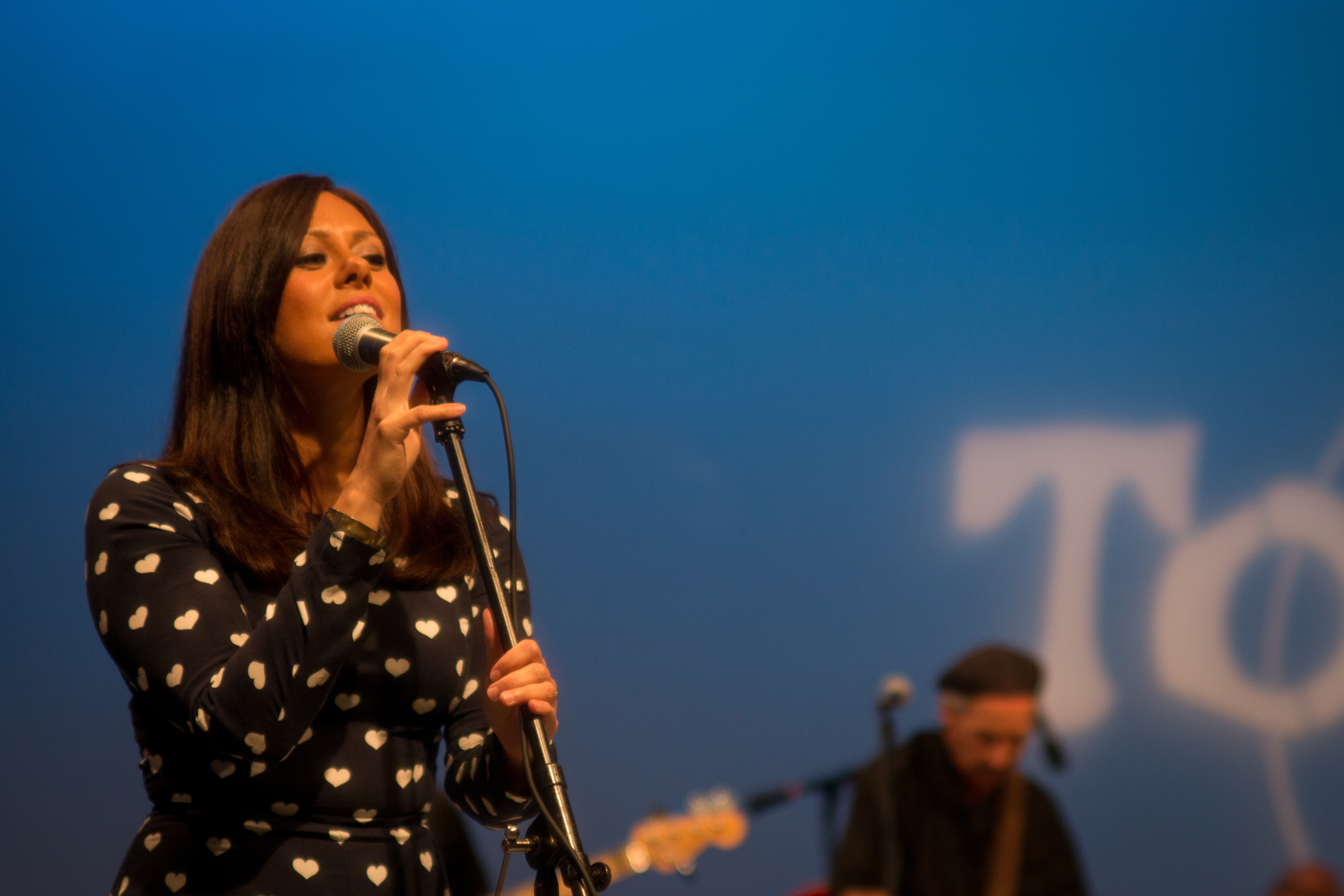
- Mônica da Silva performing with Complicated Animals 2015

Background information
- Born: Grand Rapids, Michigan, United States
- Genres: Bossa nova, MPB, Indie, worldbeat, lounge, alternative, electronic
- Occupation: Singer-songwriter
- Years active: 2007–present
- Label: Socialite Fiasco Music
- Member of: Complicated Animals
- Website: www.monicadasilva.com

Mônica Pinto da Silva Driscoll, known professionally as Mônica da Silva, is a Brazilian-American singer-songwriter and musician, performing both as a solo artist and as a member of the indie duo Complicated Animals. Da Silva's sound can be classified as International Fusion, as it is influenced by Brazilian music, namely Bossa Nova, but also incorporates elements of Lounge, Electronica, Indie Pop, MPB, and Worldbeat. Da Silva has released two solo albums Miles From Nowhere and Brasilissima. Her compositions have been featured in TV & Film, such as the Golden Globe Award winning film Lady Bird (2017), and the Paramount Network series American Woman (2018).

== Early life ==
Monica da Silva was born in Grand Rapids, Michigan, to a Brazilian mother and an American father, who met while her father was in the Peace Corps in Belém, Brazil. Because her mother is Brazilian, da Silva has dual Brazilian-American citizenship. Da Silva grew up living back and forth between the United States and Brazil. She is fluent in English and Portuguese. She started singing and playing piano and flute at an early age.

== Career ==
=== Early years and Nectar ===
Da Silva and her siblings Erica and Bruce Driscoll formed the band Nectar in their teens. The siblings performed heavily in their hometown of Grand Rapids, later embarking on national tours of colleges and venues.

In 2002, Nectar won Runner-up in the Pop Category for the UK Songwriting Contest with the song "Life Out Loud". Nectar performed at Chicago's premiere music conference and showcase Mobfest, and as a result, landed a development deal with EMI Publishing. Although there was some label interest, the band was never signed, and eventually the siblings parted ways.

=== Miles From Nowhere ===
In 2004, da Silva moved to Chicago, and met guitarist and songwriter Brett Ratner. The duo met with Grammy nominated producer Rick Barnes, who agreed to record their songs at his studio Rax Trax. Miles From Nowhere, da Silva's first studio album, was released in 2007. The second song from the album was featured on a promotional video for 3M.

=== Brasilissima ===
In December 2007, da Silva met drummer Chad Alger, after responding to an ad he had posted on Craigslist. Alger's ad, searching for "someone to start a Brazilian project with", intrigued da Silva, who had been wanting to steer her music toward her Brazilian heritage.

Da Silva and Alger formed a quartet, which performed regularly around Chicago. The pair also began writing original songs, featuring Alger on guitar. The songs they wrote were heavily influenced by Brazilian Bossa Nova. Da Silva later coined their sound Indie Nova.

Da Silva's album Brasilissima was released on 3 December 2010. It was co-produced by Alger, and Bruce Driscoll (Freedom Fry, Blondfire), who is da Silva's brother. The first single from the album "Aí Então" was featured on the Putumayo World Music compilation Brazilian Beat in 2012. The song "That’s Not The Way" was included in the programming of the 2014 FIFA World Cup on ESPN.

=== Mr. Pauer collaboration ===
Da Silva met Latin Grammy Nominated producer and re-mixer Mr. Pauer (Toto Gonzalez), while living in Miami. They cowrote a song called "Vou Voar", which was released on Mr. Pauer's 2015 album Orange. Following the release, da Silva showcased the song on KCRW's Morning Becomes Eclectic with Jason Bentley in Santa Monica, CA, and also performed at the 2015 Latin Grammy Official Afterparty at MGM Grand (Hakkasan nightclub) in Las Vegas, NV.

=== Walk on the Wild Side ===
In 2016, da Silva released a reimagined cover of Lou Reed’s "Walk on the Wild Side". The song was arranged and produced by Chad Alger in Miami, FL. The video for the song was featured in the in-flight entertainment of French Airline Air Austral in 2018.

=== Soldado de Amor ===
Da Silva's single "Soldado de Amor" was released on 31 March 2017. Written by da Silva, and her brother Bruce Driscoll (Freedom Fry, Blondfire), and mixed by Chad Alger, the song was featured in the 2017 BBC One series The Replacement, and in the 2018 Paramount Network series American Woman.

== Discography ==
=== Studio albums ===
- Miles From Nowhere (2007, Socialite Fiasco Music)
- Brasilissima (2010, Socialite Fiasco Music)

=== Singles ===
- Walk on the Wild Side (2016, Socialite Fiasco Music)
- Soldado de Amor (2017, Socialite Fiasco Music)

=== Collaboration ===
- Vou Voar on the album Orange by Mr. Pauer (2015, Fabrika Music)

=== Compilations ===
- Aí Então on the compilation album Brazilian Beat (2012, Putumayo World Music)
- Aí Então on the compilation album Ibiza Beats vol.9 (2016, Silver Angel Records)

== TV and film placements ==
- Back To His Girl in the tv series Heartland (2008, SEVEN24 Films)
- That's Not The Way in the FIFA World Cup (2014, ESPN)
- Soldado de Amor in the tv series The Replacement (2017, Left Bank Pictures)
- Back To His Girl in the motion picture Lady Bird (2017, Scott Rudin Productions)
- Soldado de Amor in the tv series American Woman (2018, Paramount Network)
- Vou Voar in the tv series Vida (2019, Big Beach, Chingona Productions)
