= Bruce Driscoll =

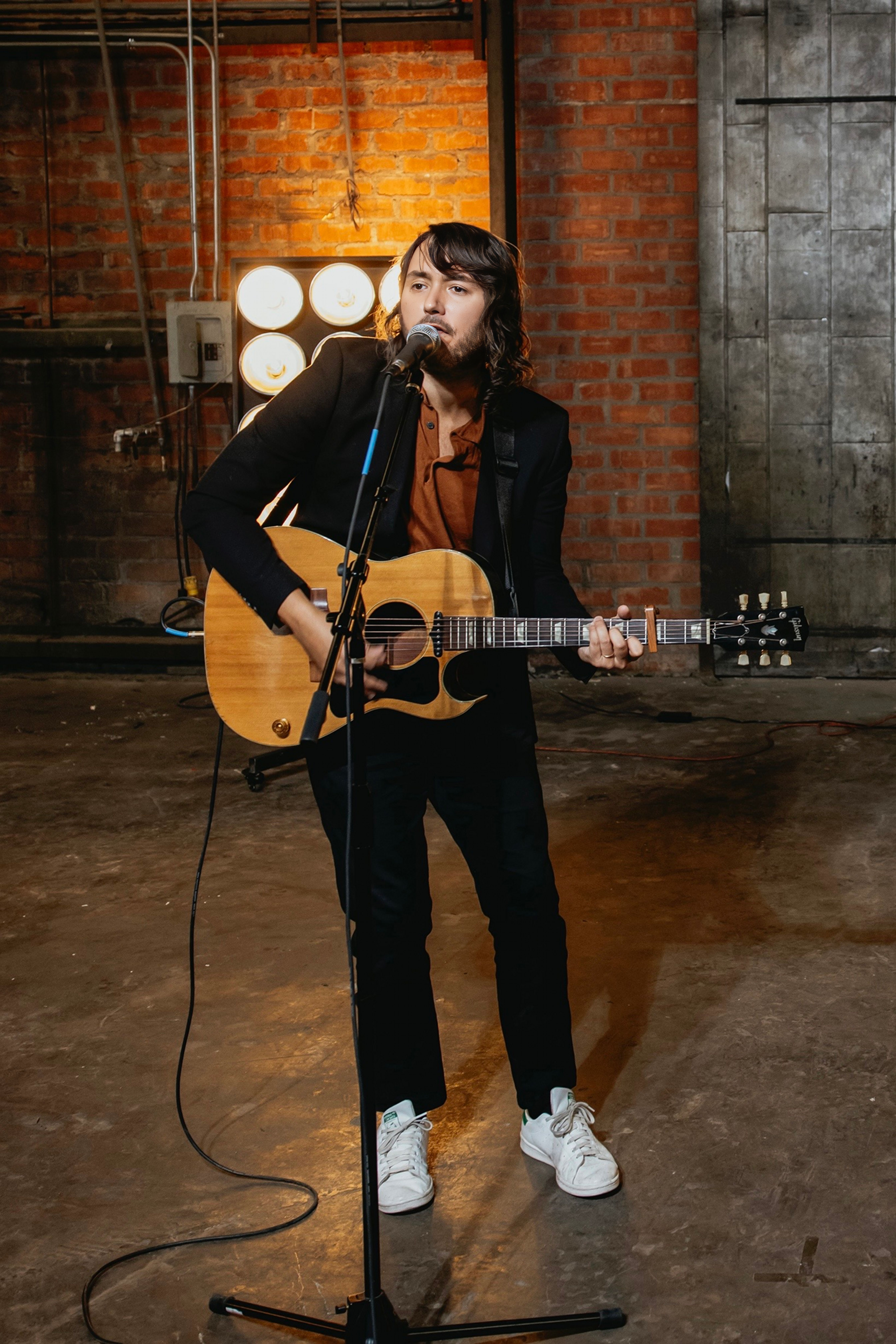
- Bruce Driscoll performing live with Freedom Fry.

Background information
- Born: Grand Rapids, Michigan, United States
- Genres: Pop; indie rock; alternative rock; dance
- Occupations: Music producer; songwriter; Audio engineer; guitarist; film composer
- Instruments: Guitar, multi-instrumentalist
- Years active: 2000–present
- Member of: Freedom Fry
- Formerly of: Blondfire
- Website: brucedriscoll.com

Bruce James Pinto Da Silva Driscoll is an American record producer, songwriter, guitarist, film composer, and vocalist.

He is one-half of French & American indie pop, folk duo Freedom Fry and co-founder of Alternative rock band Blondfire. His other writing or production credits include Avicii, Arty, Fredrika Stahl, Ivy, Sleepy Rebels, Stroik, Westrin and Mowry, and the Voyces.

== Biography ==
=== Early life and career ===
Driscoll was born in Grand Rapids, Michigan to an American father and a Brazilian mother. He started playing piano and drums at an early age, eventually picking up the guitar when he turned 15. He soon began performing alongside his two older siblings in a band called Nectar.

The siblings embarked on a national tour and eventually landed a development deal with EMI Publishing when Bruce was aged 17. Soon after, they showcased for many of the US major record labels, including Warner Bros. Records, Maverick, and Capitol. In 2002 the siblings disbanded over creative differences and no worthy record deal on the horizon.

=== Personal life ===
Driscoll is married to his Freedom Fry bandmate, Marie Seyrat. The couple have a young son and reside in Los Angeles, CA.

== Astaire ==
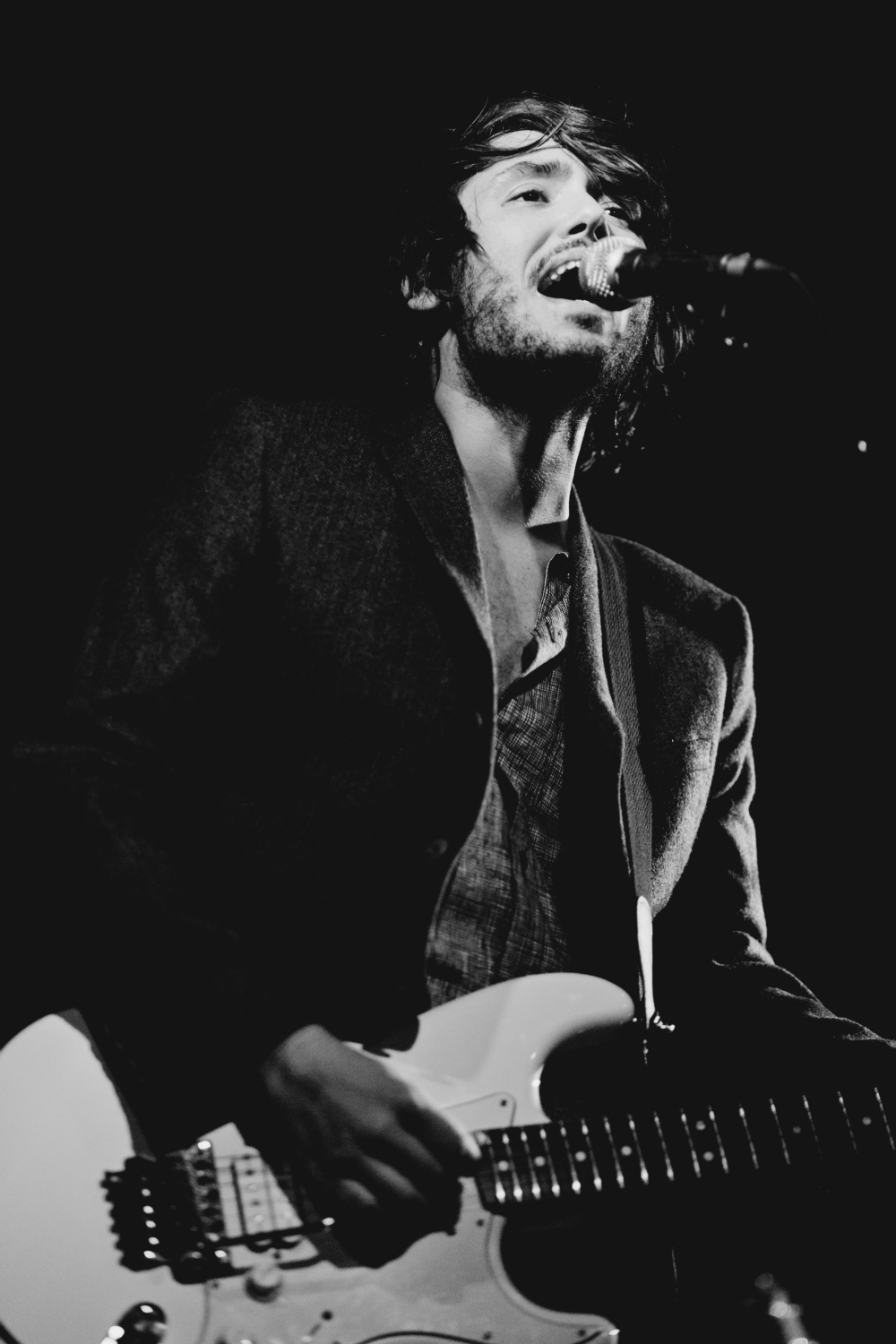
Bruce Driscoll performing live at The Hotel Café.

In 2003 Bruce and Erica Driscoll began recording songs in their parents' Michigan basement which would turn out to be early Astaire demos. The songs took a stylistically more left of center pop sound. The demos were sent to Andy Chase of Ivy who loved the songs and wanted to produce the duo at his studio, Stratosphere Sound, in New York. After working with Chase in the studio the siblings relocated to New York and released their first EP, Don't Whisper Lies, on their own label. The EP garnered the duo a feature in Entertainment Weekly as well as several film placements, including in the Jennifer Lopez film Monster-in-Law and the Nicolas Cage film Bangkok Dangerous.

The EP's single, "L-L-Love" became an iTunes Free Single of the Week and the band embarked on a national tour with Ivy, Robbers on High Street, and Stars. In the middle of the tour, lawyers for the Fred Astaire Estate threatened to sue if the duo did not change their name. Lacking the money to afford legal fees they changed their name to Blondfire.

== Blondfire ==
The duo continued on as Blondfire signing a record contract with EMI UK in October 2006. Shortly thereafter EMI was bought out by Terra Firma and went through internal changes. The duo left the label in mid-2007 and self-released their debut album, My Someday, in April 2008.

In September 2012, following the viral internet and radio success of their song, "Where The Kids Are", Blondfire signed to Warner Bros. Records and Primary Wave Publishing and began mixing of their album, Young Heart, with mixer Wally Gagel.

Blondfire’s music has appeared in films and tv shows such as Dallas Buyers Club, Fun Size, Pretty Little Liars as well advertisements from Honda and others.

== Freedom Fry ==
In April 2011, Driscoll met Parisian born Marie Seyrat during pre-production on Blondfire's "Where The Kids Are" video. Seyrat, the stylist on the video, played him a cover of her singing a song in French over a ukulele. Entranced by her whispery voice, Driscoll asked her if she would be interested in writing some songs together. In August of 2011 Freedom Fry released their first EP.

Freedom Fry’s music combines many genres, with folk, indie pop, and dance elements. Their songs are primarily sung in English but there have been several French-language releases.

In 2016 Freedom Fry signed a singles deal with Universal Music France for the song, “Shaky Ground.”

Freedom Fry songs have been featured in many notable places including M3GAN, The Morning Show, Locked Down, Shameless, Atypical, and Intuit’s Super Bowl film, “A Giant Story.” Their song, “Rolling Down” is the hold music for Amazon.

They have performed alongside Stromae, Echosmith, Phantogram, Lilly Wood and the Prick, Aurora, as well as performing a nationwide in-store tour with the clothing brand Madewell. They were official South by Southwest artists in 2016 and 2018.

== Film Composing ==
Driscoll and his Freedom Fry bandmate, Marie Seyrat, provided the original score for seasons one and two of the Apple TV+ original series, Lovely Little Farm, starring Joel Fry and Shirley Henderson.

He also provided additional music for Netflix’s reboot of That '70s Show, entitled That '90s Show, including engineering and performing bass & guitars on the revamped theme song with the show’s principal composer James Iha and Brett Anderson of the Donnas.

Internationally, Driscoll has composed the score for Bangladeshi feature film, “Kingdom of Clay Subjects,” as well as for the Romanian comedy, Sweet Little Lies.

Driscoll composed the theme music for the cooking and travel TV series “From Scratch” starring David Moscow.

== Collaborations ==
One of Driscoll’s most notable co-writes was with Tim Bergling, better known as Avicii, with whom and Erica Driscoll he co-wrote the song “Liar Liar” for his multi-platinum album, True.

Freedom Fry collaborated with Chicago rapper Vic Mensa on the 2020 single “Happy Little Thoughts.”

Throughout his career Driscoll has continued to collaborate with Ivy’s Andy Chase. First playing keyboards in Ivy, guitar in Chase's band Brookville, and then co-writing and producing tracks for his band, Camera2.

Driscoll filled in on guitar for several dates with Belle and Sebastian’s Isobel Campbell on her tour as a duo with Mark Lanegan in 2010.

== Discography ==
- 2004 - Astaire - Don't Whisper Lies EP - Producer, Drums, Bass, Keyboards, Programming, Guitar, Vocals, Group Member
- 2005 - Various Artists - Auralgasms: Bliss Of Life - Producer, Performer
- 2005 - Blondfire - Live Session (iTunes Exclusive) EP - Guitar, Producer
- 2005 - Blondfire - Holiday EP - Producer, Guitar, Piano, Bass
- 2005 - Monster In Law (Original Soundtrack) - Producer, Guitar
- 2006 - Brookville - Life In The Shade - Synthesizer, Bass, Guitar, Theremin, Vocals, Producer, Engineer, Drum Programming
- 2006 - Mônica da Silva - "Miles From Nowhere" - Guitar (Rhythm), Keyboards
- 2006 - The Postmarks - Remixes - Remixer
- 2007 - The Voyces - Kissing Like It's Love - Engineer
- 2008 - Blondfire - My Someday - Producer, Mixing, Guitar, Keyboards, Vocals
- 2008 - Sleepy Rebels - World Record - Producer, Composer, Instrumentation, Vocals, Mixer, Group Member
- 2009 - Brookville - “Broken Lights” - Lead Guitar
- 2010 - Lana Mír - Lana Mír - Producer, Composer, Instrumentation, Mixer
- 2010 - Tamar Kaprelian - Sinner Or A Saint (Interscope) - Producer (New Day (Acoustic)), Engineer, Guitar
- 2010 - Mônica da Silva - Brasilissima - Producer, Guitar, Keyboards, Programming
- 2012 - Sleepy Rebels - Bah Humbug! - Producer, Composer, Instrumentation, Vocals, Mixer, Group Member
- 2011 - Sleepy Rebels - Yellow Tree - Producer, Composer, Instrumentation, Vocals, Mixer, Group Member
- 2011 - Ivy - All Hours (Nettwerk) - Programming
- 2011 - Elan - We Are - Producer ("My Baby And Me"), Composer
- 2011 - Freedom Fry - Let The Games Begin EP - Producer, Mixing, Group Member
- 2001 - Blondfire - "Where The Kids Are" (Single) - Producer, Engineer, Vocals, Guitar, Drums, Keyboards, Group Member
- 2012 - Freedom Fry - "Earthquake" (Single) - Producer, Mixing, Group Member
- 2012 - Blondfire - "Walking With Giants" (Single) - Producer, Vocals, Guitar, Drums, Keyboards, Group Member
- 2012 - Freedom Fry - Outlaws EP - Producer, Mixing, Group Member
- 2012 - Freedom Fry - "Summer in the City" (Single) - Producer, Mixing, Group Member
- 2012 - Blondfire - Where The Kids Are EP (Warner Bros) - Producer, Engineer, Guitar, Drums, Vocals, Bass, Keyboards, Group Member
- 2012 - Freedom Fry - "Dark Christmas" (Single) - Producer, Engineer, Vocals, Guitar, Drums, Keyboards, Group Member
- 2012 - Camera2 - "Just About Made It" (Single) - Producer, Engineer, Vocals, Guitar, Bass, Drum Programming
- 2013 - Avicii - True - Composer
- 2023 - Dallas Buyers Club (soundtrack) - Composer, Producer
- 2014 - Blondfire - Young Heart - Producer, Engineer, Guitar, Drums, Vocals, Bass, Keyboards, Group Member
- 2014 - Freedom Fry - "Home" (Single) - Producer, Engineer, Vocals, Guitar, Drums, Keyboards, Group Member
- 2014 - Freedom Fry - The Wilder Mile EP - Producer, Engineer, Vocals, Guitar, Drums, Keyboards, Group Member
- 2014 - Freedom Fry - “Scarborough Fair” (Single) - Producer, Mixing, Group Member
- 2014 - Freedom Fry - “Blackmailed” (Single) - Producer, Mixing, Group Member
- 2014 - Freedom Fry - “Fan Club: The Singles (2011 - 2014)” Vinyl Album - Producer, Mixing, Group Member
- 2015 - Freedom Fry - “Shaky Ground (Hey Na Na Na)" (Single) - Producer, Mixing, Group Member
- 2015 - Freedom Fry - “Yeah You” (Single) - Producer, Mixing, Group Member
- 2015 - Freedom Fry - “Break Into a Musical” (Single) - Producer, Mixing, Group Member
- 2015 - Freedom Fry - “21” (Single) - Producer, Mixing, Group Member
- 2015 - Freedom Fry - “Tropicana” (Single) - Producer, Mixing, Group Member
- 2015 - Freedom Fry - “Oops!…I Did It Again” (Single) - Producer, Mixing, Group Member
- 2015 - Freedom Fry - “1979” (Single) - Producer, Mixing, Group Member
- 2016 - Freedom Fry - “The Words” (Single) - Producer, Mixing, Group Member
- 2016 - Freedom Fry - “Smells Like Teen Spirit” (Single) - Producer, Mixing, Group Member
- 2016 - Freedom Fry - “Linger” (Single) - Producer, Mixing, Group Member
- 2017 - Freedom Fry - “Awake” (Single) - Producer, Mixing, Group Member
- 2017 - Freedom Fry - “Remixes” EP - Producer, Mixing, Group Member
- 2017 - Freedom Fry - “Songbird” (Single) - Producer, Mixing, Group Member
- 2017 - Freedom Fry - “My Valentine” (Single) - Producer, Mixing, Group Member
- 2017 - Freedom Fry - “Junkie” (Single) - Producer, Mixing, Group Member
- 2017 - Freedom Fry - “Napoleon” (Single) - Producer, Mixing, Group Member
- 2017 - Freedom Fry - “Mary Jane’s Last Dance” (Single) - Producer, Mixing, Group Member
- 2017 - Freedom Fry - “Strange Attraction” EP - Producer, Mixing, Group Member
- 2017 - Freedom Fry - “Brave” (Single) - Producer, Mixing, Group Member
- 2017 - Freedom Fry - “Wild Child” (Single) - Producer, Mixing, Group Member
- 2017 - Freedom Fry - “Brave (Freedom Fry Remix)” (Single) - Producer, Mixing, Group Member
- 2017 - Freedom Fry - “When the Snowflakes Fall” (Single) - Producer, Mixing, Group Member
- 2017 - Freedom Fry - “Holiday Soundtrack” EP - Producer, Mixing, Group Member
- 2018 - Freedom Fry - “Girl on Fire” (Single) - Producer, Mixing, Group Member
- 2018 - Freedom Fry - “Classic” - Producer, Mixing, Group Member
- 2019 - Freedom Fry - “The Seasons” EP - Producer, Mixing, Group Member
- 2019 - Freedom Fry - “New Life” EP - Producer, Mixing, Group Member
- 2019 - Freedom Fry - “Glory Days” EP - Producer, Mixing, Group Member
- 2019 - Freedom Fry - “Renegade” EP - Producer, Mixing, Group Member
- 2019 - Freedom Fry - “The Sun is Gonna Shine on You” EP - Producer, Mixing, Group Member
- 2019 - Freedom Fry - “Rio Grande” EP - Producer, Mixing, Group Member
- 2019 - Freedom Fry - “Come Bring Your Love” EP - Producer, Mixing, Group Member
- 2019 - Freedom Fry - “The Summer” EP - Producer, Mixing, Group Member
- 2019 - Freedom Fry - “1983” EP - Producer, Mixing, Group Member
- 2019 - Freedom Fry - “Matchstick” EP w/ CLARA-NOVA - Producer, Mixing, Group Member
- 2019 - Freedom Fry - “Holiday Soundtrack Vol. 2” EP - Producer, Mixing, Group Member
- 2019 - Freedom Fry - “Zoom” EP - Producer, Mixing, Group Member
- 2020 - Freedom Fry - “Stronger” (Single) - Producer, Mixing, Group Member
- 2020 - Freedom Fry - “Songs from the West Coast” - Producer, Mixing, Group Member
- 2020 - Freedom Fry - “Happy Little Thoughts (feat. Vic Mensa” (Single) - Producer, Mixing, Group Member
- 2020 - Freedom Fry - “Human” (Single) - Producer, Mixing, Group
- 2020 - Freedom Fry - “One Big Happy Family” (Single) - Producer, Mixing, Group Member
- 2020 - Freedom Fry - “Holiday Soundtrack Vol. 3” EP - Producer, Mixing, Group Member
- 2021 - Fredrika Stahl - “Natten” - Co-writer, co-producer, and Guitar on “Electric”
- 2021 - Freedom Fry - “Reprises” EP - Producer, Mixing, Group Member
- 2021 - Freedom Fry - “Reprises II” EP Producer, Mixing, Group Member
- 2021 - Freedom Fry - “Broken Down on Planet 909” EP - Producer, Mixing, Group Member
- 2021 - Freedom Fry - “Colors” (Single) - Producer, Mixing, Group Member
- 2021 - Freedom Fry - “L’Invitation” - Producer, Mixing, Group Member
- 2021 - Freedom Fry - “Smile” (Single) - Producer, Mixing, Group Member
- 2021 - Freedom Fry - “I Didn’t Feel Like Dancing” (Single) - Producer, Mixing, Group Member
- 2021 - Freedom Fry - “Be Your Man” (Single) - Producer, Mixing, Group Member
- 2021 - Freedom Fry - “Monster” (Single) - Producer, Mixing, Group Member
- 2022 - Freedom Fry - “Mr. Nobody” (Single) - Producer, Mixing, Group Member
- 2022 - Freedom Fry - “Sing-a-long Series” EP - Producer, Mixing, Group Member
- 2022 - Freedom Fry - “Lovely Little Farm: Season 1 (2022, Apple TV+ Original Series Soundtrack) EP - Producer, Mixing, Group Member
- 2022 - Freedom Fry - “Strange for Love” EP - Producer, Mixing, Group Member
- 2022 - Freedom Fry - “Falling” EP - Producer, Mixing, Group Member
- 2022 - Freedom Fry - “True to Ourselves” EP - Producer, Mixing, Group Member
- 2022 - Freedom Fry - “Hot Tub Time Machine” (Single) - Producer, Mixing, Group Member
- 2022 - Freedom Fry - “Sunset Blvd” (Single) - Producer, Mixing, Group Member
- 2023 - Freedom Fry - “YOLO” (Single) - Producer, Mixing, Group Member
- 2023 - Freedom Fry - “Rescue” (Single) - Producer, Mixing, Group Member
- 2023 - Freedom Fry - “Dreamland” (Single) - Producer, Mixing, Group Member
