= Freedom Fry =

Pop band

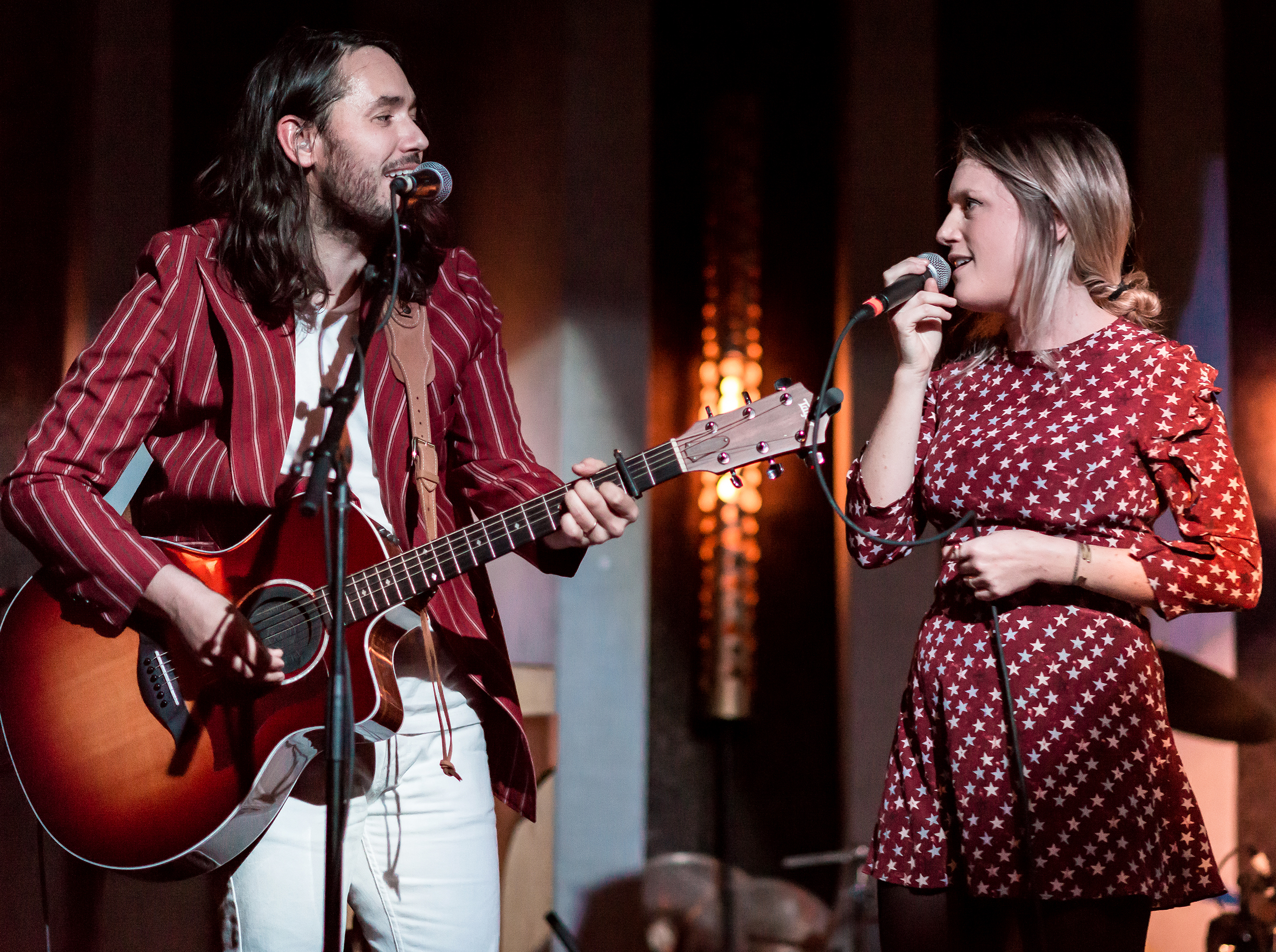

Background information
- Origin: Los Angeles, Paris
- Genres: Pop, indie pop, folk, folk pop, folk rock, alternative rock
- Years active: 2011–present
- Labels: AWAL and Caveman Arts Society, Formerly Polydor Records Europe Territory
- Members: Bruce Driscoll; Marie Seyrat
- Website: www.freedomfrymusic.com

Freedom Fry is a Los Angeles, California based indie band, composed of Parisian-born Marie Seyrat and American Bruce Driscoll.

== Career ==
=== 2011–2014 ===
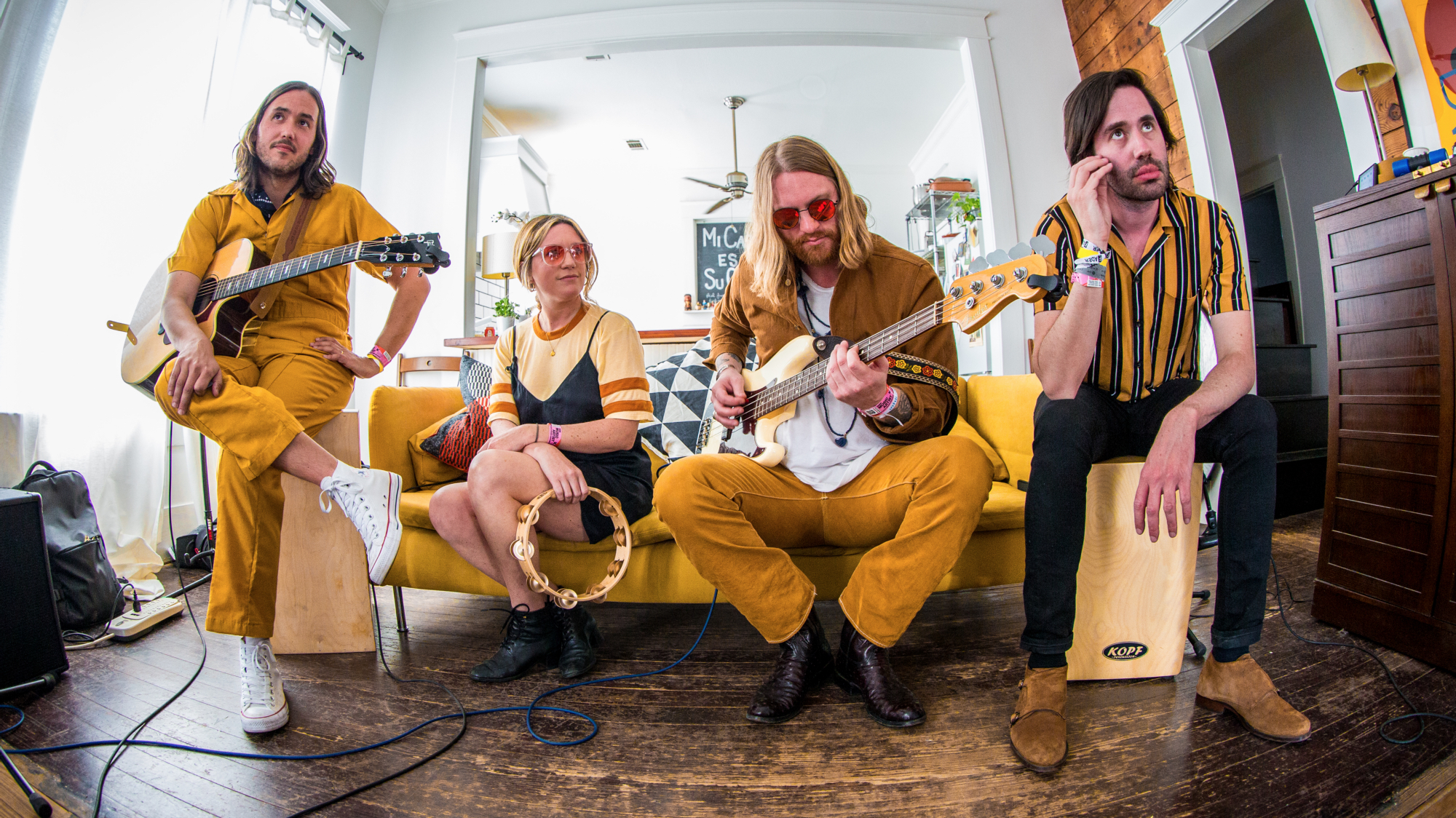
Freedom Fry performing for KUTX at SXSW

The duo first met in April 2011 when Seyrat was the stylist on a video for Driscoll's other band Blondfire. Impressed by Seyrat's whispery voice, Driscoll asked her if she would be interested in writing some songs together. In August 2011 they recorded and released the Let The Games Begin EP. The video for the first single, Tallest Dreams, starred Gia Mantegna, daughter of actor Joe Mantegna. The last song on the EP, "Rolling Down," was featured on the Season 7 premiere of Bones, during the birth of the main character's baby, Christine.

Their follow up single and video, "Earthquake," was released on Valentine's Day 2012. It was named single-of-the-week by French music magazine Les Inrockuptibles. Glamour Magazine included Earthquake in their 100th issue anniversary playlist. Earthquake has been used in advertisements by fashion brands Lanvin and Princesse tam tam.

Following a visit to the grave of Billy the Kid in Fort Sumner, NM, the duo began to conceptualize a wild west themed EP. In April 2012, they released the Outlaws EP, featuring two original songs and a cover of Serge Gainsbourg and Brigitte Bardot's Bonnie and Clyde.

The single and video for "Summer in the City," was released in July 2012. A remix of "Summer in the City" by Starcadian was featured in the viral YouTube video, "How the sun sees you," in August 2014. Using unique UV lenses to show sun damage to skin and the benefits of sunscreen, the video has amassed over 19 million views.

The EP and video The Wilder Mile were released in August 2014. The Wilder Mile has been used in advertisements for brands Abercrombie, Madewell, and REI.

=== 2015–2017 ===
At the end of 2014 the band began working with The Agency Group and manager Jeff Klein (formerly of A-Side Worldwide). Their first musical offering of 2015 was the hit single "Shaky Ground (Hey Na Na Na)". The song reached #1 on Hype Machine.

In May 2015, Freedom Fry released the single "21". The handclaps, group vocals, and scream featured in the song were performed by the audiences at their Echo residency in Los Angeles as part of a crowd recording experiment. The song reached #1 on Hype Machine.

In 2016 the band signed with Polydor Records in Europe and officially released "Shaky Ground" with an accompanying two-part music video featuring both the English version and a new French version of the song. "Shaky Ground" was used in the official trailer for Locked Down, the 2021 Doug Liman film starring Anne Hathaway and has also been featured in The Flash, Shameless, and God Friended Me.

In January 2017, Freedom Fry released the single "Awake". "Awake" has been heard in many advertisements, films, and television shows, including American Idol, MTV's Catfish, House Husbands, Job or No Job, Recovery Road, the Netflix original series Love, and the film Baby Baby Baby, starring Adrianne Palicki with Jessica Alba and William Shatner.

The EP Strange Attraction was released in September 2017. Nylon premiered the music video for the title track. Noisey premiered the music video for the song "Party Down," which reached #2 on Hype Machine. The "Party Down" video was filmed at the 70s themed Hollywood bar, Good Times at Davey Wayne's.

=== "Girl On Fire" ===
Freedom Fry's cover of "Man on Fire" by Edward Sharpe and the Magnetic Zeros was featured in the Super Bowl ad "A Giant Story" by Intuit. The reworked version, titled "Girl on Fire", was released in February 2018. The short film from Intuit has amassed over 20 million views on YouTube.

=== Classic LP ===
In February 2018 Freedom Fry announced their forthcoming debut album, Classic. On June 1, 2018, the album was released. It included two previously released songs, "Awake" and "Wild Child", and ten new songs. The song "Cold Blooded Heart" premiered on Culture Collide. The track "Die Tryin" premiered on Billboard. The album features notable performances from Stewart Cole of Edward Sharpe and the Magnetic Zeros and string arranger, Phillip Peterson. The song "Classic" reached #1 on the Hype Machine. The band's marketing efforts for Classic included a billboard on Melrose Avenue, flying an airplane banner above South by Southwest, and surprising the audience with mariachis during their official SXSW showcase and at their album release show in Los Angeles. An album trailer starring Shameless actress Emma Kenney was released on YouTube.

=== 2019 EPs ===
During 2019 Freedom Fry released a new three-song EP every month. Each EP consisted of two original songs and a cover. The covers included songs from Carly Simon, Elton John, Styx, the Smiths, the Strokes, and others. Their cover of Clint Eastwood by Gorillaz was used as the end credits song during the Season 1 finale of The Morning Show starring Jennifer Aniston and Reese Witherspoon. In June 2019 the duo released a remix of Bad Guy by Billie Eilish on their SoundCloud page.

=== Songs from the West Coast LP ===
In May 2020 Freedom Fry released the "Songs from the West Coast" LP. It was recorded on location at several iconic California destinations: Bungalow 87 of the Chateau Marmont, the Gypsy Rocks room of the Madonna Inn, Joshua Tree National Park, and Santa Catalina Island. Notable collaborations on songs from the album include rapper Vic Mensa and drummer Joey Waronker.

=== L'Invitation LP ===
In April 2021 Freedom Fry released L'Invitation, their first full-length French-language album. The track "Le Point Zéro" was featured in the 2023 Blumhouse Productions and Universal Pictures horror-comedy M3GAN.

In 2022, Freedom Fry collaborated with California rapper/producer A-F-R-O for their single, “Mr. Nobody.”

=== Other covers ===
Freedom Fry's cover of Britney Spears' "Oops!... I Did It Again" debuted on November 5, 2015, during an episode of Grey's Anatomy. That same month, Freedom Fry released an acoustic cover of "1979" by The Smashing Pumpkins with an accompanying music video.

In April 2016, Freedom Fry released a French-language cover of "Smells Like Teen Spirit" by Nirvana. In November 2016, they released an acoustic cover of "Linger" by The Cranberries. A French-language cover of "Mary Jane's Last Dance" by Tom Petty was released in March 2017 with an accompanying video.

In October 2022, Ralph Lauren used the duo's French-language cover of Fred Neil's "Everybody's Talkin'" during his West Coast fashion show California Dreaming.

=== Scoring work ===
In June 2022 Apple TV+ released the live-action animated hybrid family series, Lovely Little Farm, with original songs and score provided by Freedom Fry.

=== Touring ===
Freedom Fry has toured the U.S. as direct support for Belgian superstar Stromae, as part of Communion Presents, and Madewell's 2016 "Denim Forever" campaign and tour. At their Monday night residency at The Echo in the Echo Park neighborhood of Los Angeles, they were joined on stage by special guests James Iha and Mayer Hawthorne.

== Discography ==
=== LPs ===
- Classic (2018, Caveman Arts Society)
- Songs from the West Coast (2020, Caveman Arts Society)
- L'Invitation (2021, Caveman Arts Society)

=== EPs ===
- Let the Games Begin (2011, Caveman Arts Society)
- Outlaws (2012, Caveman Arts Society)
- Friends and Enemies (2013, Caveman Arts Society)
- The Wilder Mile (2014, Caveman Arts Society)
- Remixes (2017, Caveman Arts Society)
- Strange Attraction (2017, Caveman Arts Society)
- Holiday Soundtrack (2017, Caveman Arts Society)
- The Seasons (2019, Caveman Arts Society)
- New Life (2019, Caveman Arts Society)
- Glory Days (2019, Caveman Arts Society)
- Renegade (2019, Caveman Arts Society)
- The Sun Is Gonna Shine on You (2019, Caveman Arts Society)
- Rio Grande (2019, Caveman Arts Society)
- Come Bring Your Love (2019, Caveman Arts Society)
- The Summer (2019, Caveman Arts Society)
- 1983 (2019, AWAL)
- Matchstick w/ CLARA-NOVA (2019, Caveman Arts Society)
- Holiday Soundtrack Vol. 2 (2019, Caveman Arts Society)
- Zoom (2019, Caveman Arts Society)
- Holiday Soundtrack Vol. 3 (2020, Caveman Arts Society)
- Reprises (2021, Caveman Arts Society)
- Reprises II (2021, Caveman Arts Society)
- Broken Down on Planet 909 (2021, Caveman Arts Society)
- Sing-a-long Series (2022, Caveman Arts Society)
- Lovely Little Farm: Season 1 (2022, Apple TV+ Original Series Soundtrack)
- Strange for Love (2022, Caveman Arts Society)
- Falling (2022, Caveman Arts Society)
- True to Ourselves (2022, Caveman Arts Society)

=== Singles ===
- "Earthquake" (2012, Caveman Arts Society)
- "Summer in the City" (2012, Caveman Arts Society)
- "Dark Christmas" (2012, Caveman Arts Society)
- "Home" (2014, Caveman Arts Society)
- "Scarborough Fair" (2014, Caveman Arts Society)
- "Blackmailed" (2014, Caveman Arts Society)
- "Shaky Ground (Hey Na Na Na)" (2015, via SoundCloud)
- "Yeah You" (2015, via SoundCloud)
- "Break Into a Musical" (2015, via SoundCloud)
- "21" (2015, via SoundCloud)
- "Tropicana" (2015, Caveman Arts Society)
- "Oops!... I Did It Again" (2015, via ABC Grey's Anatomy Episode 251)
- "1979" (2015, Caveman Arts Society)
- "The Words" (2016, SoundCloud)
- "Smells Like Teen Spirit" (2016, via Caveman Arts Society)
- "Shaky Ground" (2016, Caveman Arts Society, Polydor Records Europe)
- "Linger" (2016, Caveman Arts Society)
- "Awake" (2017, Caveman Arts Society)
- "Songbird" (2017, Caveman Arts Society)
- "My Valentine" (2017, Caveman Arts Society)
- "Junkie" (2017, Caveman Arts Society)
- "Napoleon" (2017, Caveman Arts Society)
- "Mary Jane's Last Dance" (2017, Caveman Arts Society)
- "Brave" (2017, Caveman Arts Society)
- "Wild Child" (2017, Caveman Arts Society)
- "Brave (Freedom Fry Remix)" (2017, Caveman Arts Society)
- "When the Snowflakes Fall" (2017, Caveman Arts Society)
- "Girl on Fire" (2018, Caveman Arts Society)
- "Stronger" (2020, Caveman Arts Society)
- "Happy Little Thoughts (feat. Vic Mensa)" (2020, Caveman Arts Society)
- "Human" (2020, Caveman Arts Society)
- "One Big Happy Family" (2020, Caveman Arts Society)
- "Colors" (2021, Caveman Arts Society)
- "Smile" (2021, Caveman Arts Society)
- "I Didn't Feel Like Dancing" (2021, Caveman Arts Society)
- "Be Your Man" (2021, Caveman Arts Society)
- "Monster" (2021, Caveman Arts Society)
- "Mr. Nobody (feat. A-F-R-O) (2022, Caveman Arts Society)
- "Hot Tub Time Machine" (2022, Caveman Arts Society)
- "Sunset Blvd" (2022, Caveman Arts Society)

=== Vinyl ===
- "Fan Club: The Singles (2011 - 2014)" (2014, Caveman Arts Society)

=== Collaborations ===
- "Skyscraper Souls" - Chordashian feat. Freedom Fry (2013, Self Released)
- "Racers" - A.W.O.L. feat. Freedom Fry (2015, No Brainer Records)

=== Compilation appearances ===
- Perez Hilton's Pop Up! #6 (song: "The Wilder Mile")
- Poule d'Or Compilation #9 (song: "Tallest Dreams")
- Kitsune Hot Stream (song: "Tropicana")
- "King Kong Kicks Vol. 6" (song: "21")
- "Vinyl Moon, Vol. 050: Volume 50" (song: "Zombie Love")
