= Marie Seyrat =

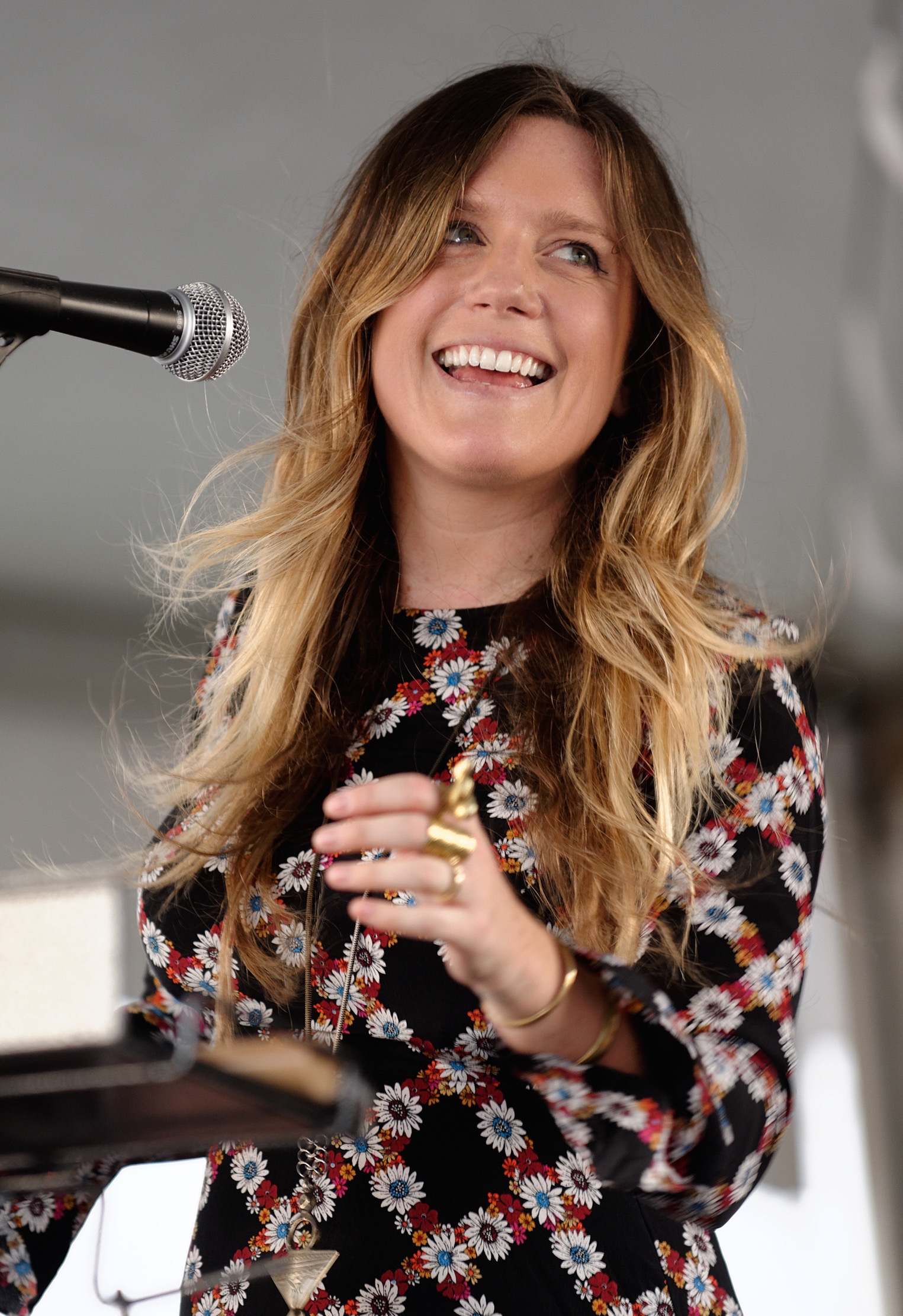
- Marie Seyrat singing with Freedom Fry

Background information
- Origin: Paris, France
- Genres: Pop, indie pop, alternative rock
- Occupations: Singer-songwriter, lyricist, record producer
- Years active: 2010–present
- Member of: Freedom Fry

Marie Seyrat is a French record producer and singer-songwriter for the indie pop band Freedom Fry.

== Career ==
Seyrat began her career in fashion working for Gucci and styling the likes of Sharon Stone. She met record producer Bruce Driscoll while employed as his stylist for a music video. During this time, Seyrat performed some music she'd been working on. Driscoll, whom she would later marry, was impressed by her voice and her French-accented vocals. They began writing songs together and formed the group Freedom Fry soon after.
