= 1106 Cydonia =

Main-belt asteroid

Discovery
- Discovered by: K. Reinmuth
- Discovery site: Heidelberg Obs.
- Discovery date: 5 February 1929

Designations
- Pronunciation: /saɪˈdoʊniə/
- Named after: Cydonia (quince) (flowering plant)
- Alternative designations: 1929 CW
- Minor planet category: main-belt · (middle); Eunomia

Orbital characteristics
- Epoch 23 March 2018 (JD 2458200.5)
- Uncertainty parameter 0
- Observation arc: 88.41 yr (32,292 days)
- Aphelion: 2.9246 AU
- Perihelion: 2.2673 AU
- Semi-major axis: 2.5959 AU
- Eccentricity: 0.1266
- Orbital period (sidereal): 4.18 yr (1,528 days)
- Mean anomaly: 71.500°
- Mean motion: 0° 14^{m} 8.16^{s} / day
- Inclination: 13.065°
- Longitude of ascending node: 328.26°
- Argument of perihelion: 230.23°

Physical characteristics
- Mean diameter: 12.140±0.093 km 12.818±0.182 km 12.95±0.94 km 13.26 km (calculated)
- Synodic rotation period: 2.6700±0.0181 h 2.679±0.001 h
- Geometric albedo: 0.1719±0.0182; 0.21 (assumed); 0.241±0.018
- Spectral type: SMASS = S
- Absolute magnitude (H): 11.60 · 11.7 · 11.8 · 12.0 · 12.06±0.28

1106 Cydonia (/saɪˈdoʊniə/), provisional designation 1929 CW, is a Eunomian asteroid from the central regions of the asteroid belt, approximately 13 kilometers (8 miles) in diameter. It was discovered on 5 February 1929, by astronomer Karl Reinmuth at the Heidelberg-Königstuhl State Observatory in Germany. The asteroid was named for the fruit-bearing tree Cydonia (quince). The S-type asteroid has a relatively short rotation period of 2.7 hours.

== Orbit and classification ==
Cydonia is a member of the Eunomia family (502), a prominent family of stony asteroids and the largest one in the intermediate main belt with more than 5,000 members. It orbits the Sun in the central asteroid belt at a distance of 2.3–2.9 AU once every 4 years and 2 months (1,528 days; semi-major axis 2.60 AU). Its orbit has an eccentricity of 0.13 and an inclination of 13° with respect to the ecliptic. The body's observation arc begins with its first and official discovery observation at Heidelberg in February 1929.

== Physical characteristics ==
In the SMASS classification, Cydonia is a stony S-type asteroid, in-line with the Eunomia family's overall spectral type.

=== Rotation period ===
In December 2015, a rotational lightcurve of Cydonia was obtained from photometric observations by astronomers at the Etscorn Observatory (719) in New Mexico, United States. Lightcurve analysis gave a well-defined rotation period of 2.679 hours with a brightness variation of 0.28 magnitude (U=3). In April 2017, Spanish astronomers at Puçol Observatory (J42) and other stations of the APTOG-network measured a similar period of 2.6700 hours and an amplitude of 0.10 magnitude (U=2+).

=== Diameter and albedo ===
According to the survey carried out by the NEOWISE mission of NASA's Wide-field Infrared Survey Explorer, Cydonia measures between 12.140 and 12.95 kilometers in diameter and its surface has an albedo between 0.1719 and 0.241.

The Collaborative Asteroid Lightcurve Link assumes an albedo of 0.21 – derived from 15 Eunomia, the family's parent body and namesake – and calculates a diameter of 13.26 kilometers based on an absolute magnitude of 11.7.

== Naming ==
This minor planet was named after the genus Cydonia in the family Rosaceae, with the fruit-bearing quince tree as its only member. The official naming citation was mentioned in The Names of the Minor Planets by Paul Herget in 1955 (H 104).

=== Reinmuth's flowers ===
Due to his many discoveries, Karl Reinmuth submitted a large list of 66 newly named asteroids in the early 1930s. The list covered his discoveries with numbers between (1009) and (1200). This list also contained a sequence of 28 asteroids, starting with 1054 Forsytia, that were all named after plants, in particular flowering plants (also see list of minor planets named after animals and plants).
