= Blondfire =

American indie pop band

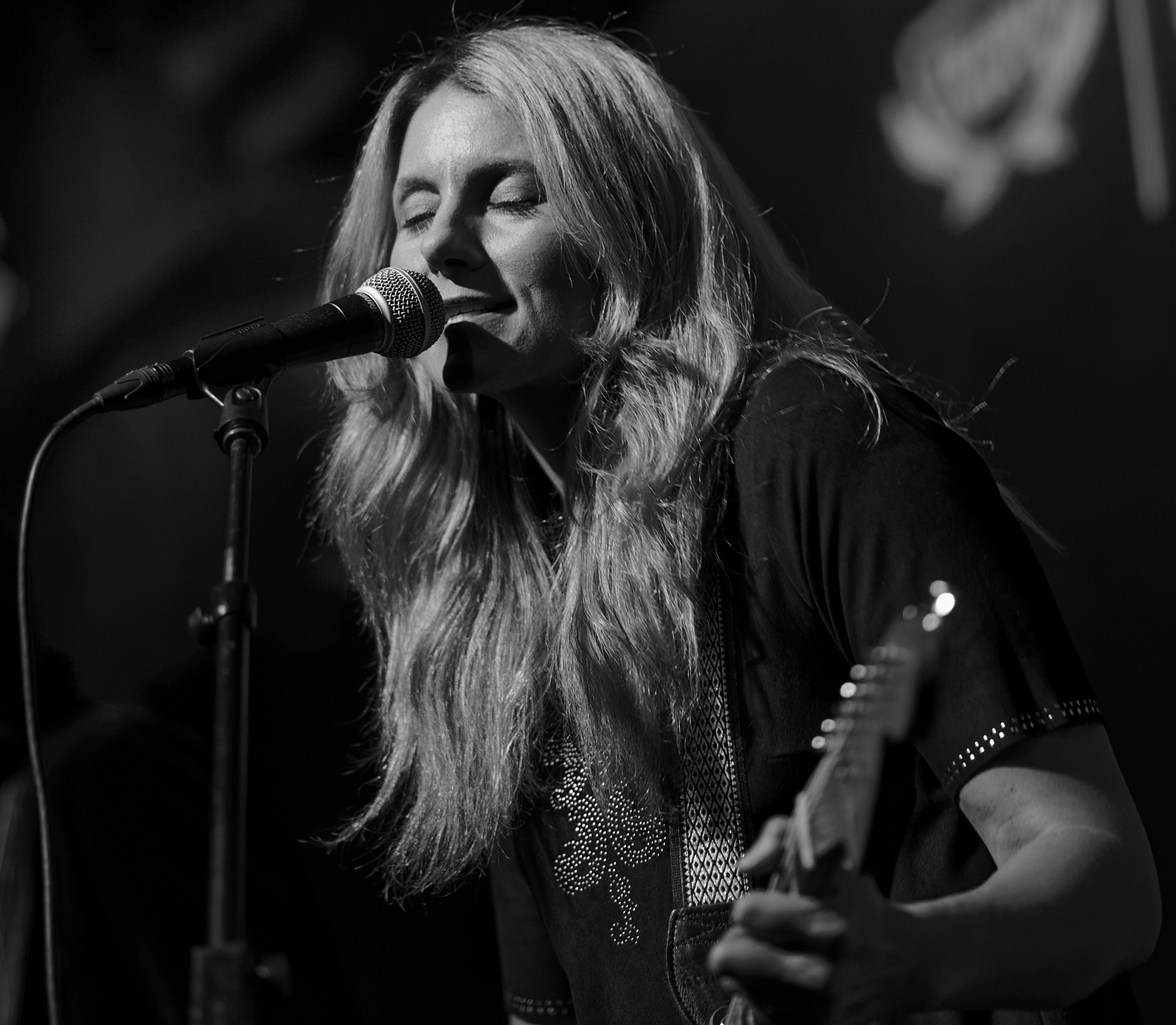

Background information
- Also known as: Astaire
- Origin: New York City
- Genres: Indie pop, electronica, alternative rock, dance
- Years active: 2004–present
- Labels: Warner Bros., Primary Wave, WAX LTD
- Members: Erica Driscoll
- Past members: Bruce Driscoll
- Website: www.blondfire.com

Blondfire is an American indie pop band from Los Angeles, California, United States. It started as a duo of brother and sister Bruce and Erica Driscoll, under the name Astaire, and since 2015 has been a solo act with Erica Driscoll.

== Early life ==
Erica Driscoll was born and raised in Grand Rapids, Michigan, United States to an American father and a Brazilian mother. She spent many summers in northern Brazil, and is a citizen of both countries. Erica and her brother and founding member Bruce Driscoll cite Antonio Carlos Jobim, Caetano Veloso, and Astrud Gilberto as musicians that they listened to often while growing up. In high school, Erica and her older sister Monica formed the band Nectar, along with Arland Nicewander, Ryan Butts, and Jason Drost. The band eschewed classes to tour nationally. In addition to that, their song In The Shadows was chosen to be used in WGRD Radioactiv 4 compilation series, which also includes Mustard Plug and Epic Records recording artists Papa Vegas and Getaway Cruiser.

== History ==
=== Astaire ===
Erica and Bruce formed Astaire and toured locally behind songs recorded in the basement of their parents' home. During this time, the siblings were featured in many music and fashion publications, such as z!nk, America, YRB, College Music Journal, and Entertainment Weekly. The Driscolls relocated to New York City and recorded "Weightless" with Ivy's Andy Chase. They released their first EP, Don't Whisper Lies, on their own record label, Wax Divine.

The EP's single, "L-L-Love" became an iTunes Free Single of the Week and the band embarked on a national tour with Ivy, Robbers on High Street, and Stars.

=== Change to Blondfire, My Someday ===
In the middle of the tour, the Driscolls were contacted by the representatives of the estate of Fred Astaire, asking the band to stop using the name immediately. Facing expensive legal fees, the siblings changed the band's name to Blondfire. They announced the name change with the release of a new iTunes-exclusive acoustic live EP. It featured "L-L-Love" and three new songs, "Paper Doll", "Running Back", and "Fade to Pale".

In October 2006, Blondfire signed a record deal with EMI Records UK. Their debut album, My Someday, was released in 2008. Among the people thanked in the album liner notes was Fred Astaire. In a May 2008 interview, Bruce Driscoll stated that the band had parted ways with the label.

=== Young Heart ===
In November 2011, Blondfire released the single and accompanying video for "Where The Kids Are" to much critical acclaim.

In August 2012, Blondfire signed with Warner Bros. Records and Primary Wave Music.

In February 2013, Blondfire released a new music video for their song "Where the Kids Are". The track featured heavily in the 2012 Honda Civic television spots.

On 11 February 2014, Blondfire's second album, Young Heart, was released. It produced two singles, "Where the Kids Are" and "Waves".

=== Split, True Confessions ===
In 2015, Bruce left the band as a full-time member to focus on his band Freedom Fry. He continues to collaborate with Erica as a songwriter and on other creative projects.

== Live show ==
Blondfire's live lineup consists of Erica singing and playing guitar backed by a group of hand-picked musicians.

== Discography ==
=== Albums ===
- My Someday (2008, Tender Tender Rush)
- Young Heart (2014, Tender Tender Rush)
- True Confessions EP (2016, WAX LTD)

=== Singles ===
- "Don't Whisper Lies" (2004, Tender Tender Rush)
- "Pretty Young Thing" (2008, Tender Tender Rush)
- "Where The Kids Are" (2011, Tender Tender Rush)
- "Waves" (2013, Tender Tender Rush)
- "Young Heart" (2014, Tender Tender Rush)
- "Pleasure" (2015, Tender Tender Rush)
- "True Confessions" (2016, WAX LTD)
- "Here And Now" (2017, WAX LTD)
- "Black Hole Sun" (2017, WAX LTD)
- "Climb" (2020, Bliss Productions)
- "Marigold" (2020, Bliss Productions)
- "Fearless (The Spark)" (2020, UPM-US)
- "Starboy" (2020, Bliss Productions)
- "Age of Innocence" (2023, Bliss Productions)
- "Heaven Knows I'm Miserable Now (Cover)" (2023, Bliss Productions)
- "Elated" (2023, Bliss Productions)
- "Foolish" (2024, Bliss Productions)
- "Dirty Fingers" (2024, Bliss Productions)
- "A Million Miles" (2024, Bliss Productions)
- "Do it Again" (2025, Bliss Productions)
- "Get You High" (2025, Bliss Productions)

=== Other appearances ===
- "Liar Liar", from the album True (2013) by Avicii
- "Glorious", from the album Glorious (2015) by Arty
- "Something About You", from the album Something About You (2016) by Paris Blohm
- "Golden (feat. Blondfire)" (SpinninRecords, 2021) by Sander van Doorn
