= Starcadian =

Greek-American musician (1980–2025)

- Also known as: Starcadian
- Born: Georgios Smaragdis; August 12, 1980; Athens, Greece
- Died: May 1, 2025 (aged 44) Manhattan, New York City, U.S.
- Genres: Synthwave; nu-disco; electro house
- Occupations: DJ; Music producer
- Years active: 2010–2025
- Website: starcadian.com

Georgios Smaragdis (August 12, 1980 – May 1, 2025), known professionally as Starcadian, was a Greek-American DJ and music producer.

== Career ==
Starcadian released his debut album, Sunset Blood, in 2013. The electronic music webzine Electronic Rumors described the album as “the best Disco album of the year”, comparing it favourably to Daft Punk's Random Access Memories. This was followed by Saturdaze (2014) and Midnight Signals (2017), the latter of which was later described as “a retrowave classic” by the synthwave website NewRetroWave.

In 2021, Starcadian released Radio Galaxy, which was named Album of the Year by the synthwave-focused outlet Nightride FM.

Several independent interviews and profiles have examined Starcadian's artistic approach. In a 2017 interview, he was described as seeking to create “ear-movies,” blending musical composition with cinematic ambition. A 2025 retrospective profile characterized him as “the synthwave maverick who turns the future into funk,” highlighting his creative ambition and influence within the retro-futuristic music community.

== Death ==
On May 1, 2025, Smaragdis was involved in a traffic accident while riding an electric bicycle in Manhattan, suffering severe head injuries. He was rushed to the hospital, where he died shortly afterward.

== Reception and influence ==
Starcadian's fusion of disco, synthwave, and cinematic composition attracted attention within electronic music circles. Across multiple independent publications, he has been described as a creative and influential figure in the synthwave and retrowave scene, with his albums and stylistic approach often cited as among the genre's most distinctive contributions.

An article published on the website of synthesizer manufacturer Arturia described him as a "synthwave legend". Following his death, local press coverage referred to him as a "top synthwave artist". Filmmaker Jake Bissen of Milwaukee described Starcadian as “one of the very few truly independent artists who created entire sonic worlds on his own.”

== Selected discography ==
- Sunset Blood (2013)
- Midnight Signals (2017)
- Radio Galaxy (2021)
