= Clara-Nova =

French-American musician

CLARA-NOVA
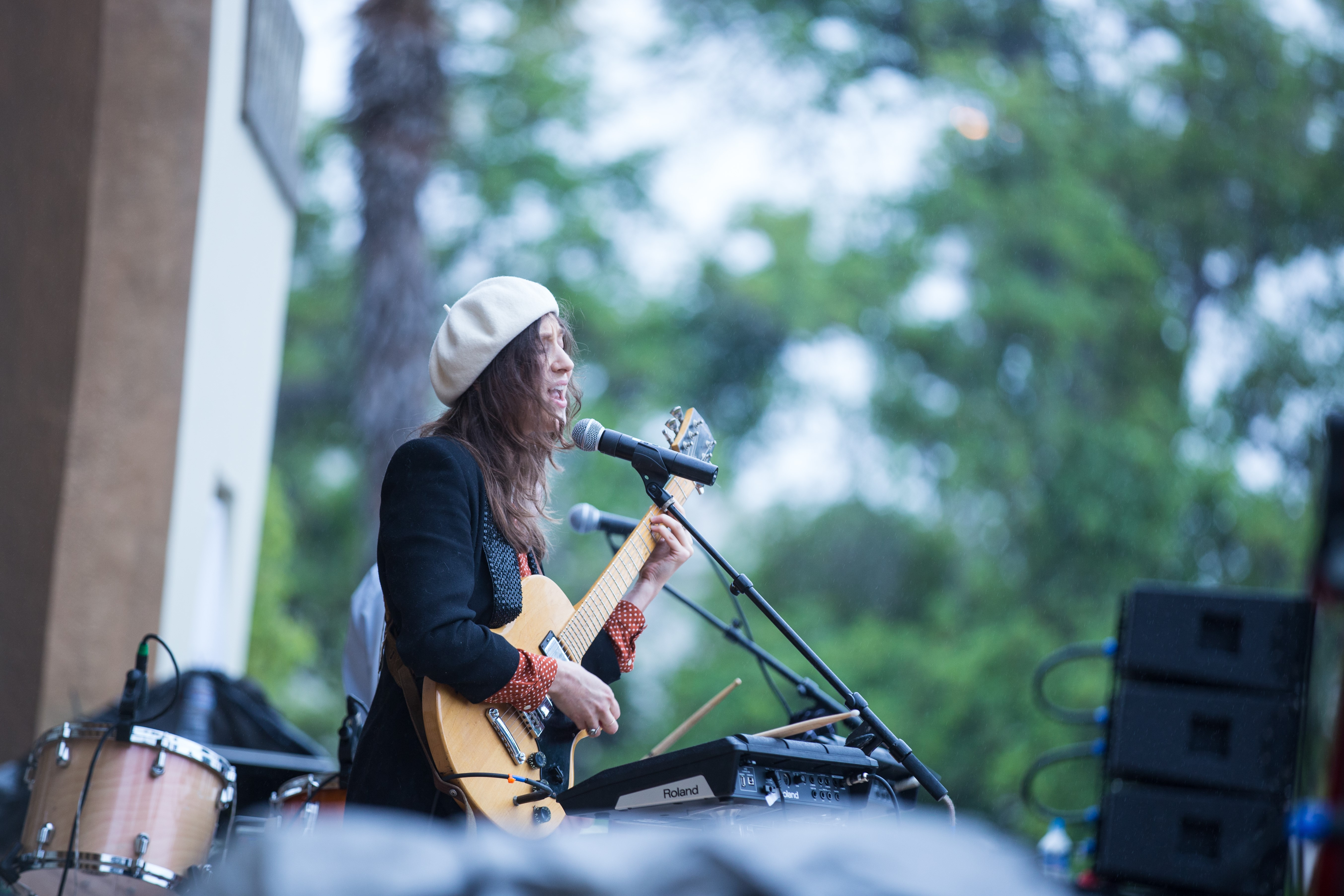
- Live performance in Pasadena, California

Background information
- Origin: Los Angeles, California
- Genres: indie rock, baroque pop, electronic
- Years active: 2007-present
- Label: AWAL
- Website: www.clara-nova.com

Sydney Wayser (born October 7, 1986), known professionally as Clara-Nova, stylized as CLARA-NOVA) is a French-American electronic indie pop artist based in Los Angeles. She is a guitarist, keyboard player and singer who has released 3 albums and 1 EP with another EP set for 2018.

== Career ==
=== Early life and recordings ===
Sydney Wayser was born in Los Angeles, but spent summers in Paris with her French musician-filmmaker father, Jacques Wayser. She graduated from the Berklee College of Music in Boston, Massachusetts then divided her time between New York, New York and Los Angeles, California making her own music that was influenced by Jeff Buckley, Serge Gainsbourg, Rufus Wainwright, Loudon Wainwright III and Leonard Cohen, as well as women like Feist and Beyonce.

When Wayser released her debut album, Silent Parade in 2008, NPR cited "her unabashed love for gloomy orchestrations and waltz rhythms. There's the tinkling glockenspiel, a lone oboe, accordion and creaking string arrangements, with Wayser's piano work steering the ship. It's an appropriate backdrop for her brooding meditations on misery and heartache, all set in a world inhabited by lurking strangers and ghosts of the past."

In 2009, Wayser's album The Colorful was released, and three years later came Bell Choir Coast. The latter album was produced by Dan Molad from Lucius and mixed by Shawn Everett.

From that album, the song "Dream It Up" was used as the soundtrack for Billabong's 2012 Summer Swim video.

After Hurricane Sandy hit New York in October 2012, Wayser's Brooklyn apartment was flooded. As a result, she moved back to Los Angeles where she created a new recording and performing persona called Clara-Nova which the LA Weekly noted "represents the evolution of Wayser, lyrically and musically. She's ditching the acoustic guitar for a standing keyboard and tambourine backed by a full band."

As Clara-Nova, Wayser debuted live in January 2014 at the Sundance Film Festival, and that March appeared on NBC's Last Call with Carson Daly to support Bell Choir Coast.

On 2014, her work earned Clara-Nova the ASCAP Abe Olman Scholarship and that same year she was signed to a major label only to see that deal end with the label taking her masters. As a result, Wayser began rerecording that music.

Clara-Nova performed at the 2016 edition of SXSW.

Wayser spent 2017 singing backup for Lorde as well as working with producer Shawn Everett (Weezer, Alabama Shakes, John Legend, Lucius) on a new Clara-Nova EP called The Iron Age set for release on March 2, 2018, on Kobalt Music Recordings. "The Illusionist" single from the EP was released September 29, 2017.

=== Trailer music ===
As Clara-Nova, Wayser's version of the Simple Minds' ballad "Belfast Child" was used in the trailer for Ridley Scott's biblical film "Exodus: Gods and Kings" in 2014. A year later, "Dear God", an XTC song covered by the band Lawless featuring Wayser on vocals was featured in a trailer for the Academy Award-winning film Spotlight. That same song version provided the music for Outlander's season 2 trailer in 2016.

The trailer for 2017's Netflix film, Icarus, featured Wayser's cover of the Cake song, "Going the Distance"

=== Song placements in TV shows ===
During her career span, Wayser has had her songs featured in a number of television shows highlighting scenes. From her Bell Choir Coast album, four songs were used in Shameless including "Dirty Work", "Geographer", "Potions" and "Wake Up". Grey's Anatomy contained Clara-Nova's cover of Hall and Oates' "Maneater" in an episode.

=== Song placements in advertising ===
As Sydney Wayser and Clara-Nova, the artist's songs have been used in national advertising spots for Madewell, Victoria's Secret, Old Navy, Billabong, Whole Foods and others.

== Discography ==
=== Albums ===
- Silent Parade (2008)
- The Colorful (2009)
- Bell Choir Coast (2012)
- The Iron Age EP (2018)

=== Guest appearances ===
- Lawless – "Dear God" (2016)
- M83 – "Go!", "Bibi The Dog", "For the Kids", "Laser Gun", "Tension" from Junk (2016)
- Ali Barter – "Light Them On Fire" from A Suitable Girl (2017)
- Timberwolf – "Íkaros" (2017)
