= Sweet Little Lies (2012 film) =

- Film poster
- Romanian: Minte-mă frumos
- Directed by: Iura Luncasu
- Starring: Diana Dumitrescu; Andi Vasluianu
- Release date: 19 October 2012
- Running time: 98 minutes
- Country: Romania
- Language: Romanian

Sweet Little Lies (Romanian: Minte-mă frumos) is a 2012 Romanian comedy film directed by Iura Luncasu.

== Cast ==
- Diana Dumitrescu as Dana
- Andi Vasluianu as Dani
- Antoaneta Zaharia as Oana
- Marius Damian as Toni
- Loredana Groza as Yvonne
